= List of Black Panther supporting characters =

This is a list of Black Panther supporting characters.

== Family tree of T'Challa ==
Black Panther family tree

The Black Panther of 1,000,000 BC	Ashake of Egypt
Unknown number of generations	Ayesha of Balobedu
Olumo Bashenga; Black Panther	Ashake of Meroë
Unknown number of generations	Unknown number of generations
Nanali	T'Chanda; Black Panther	Queen of Kenya	Achmed El-Gibar	Ainet
S'Yan the Fast; Black Panther	Ramonda	T'Chaka; Black Panther	N'Yami	Colonel Shetani	N'Dare Munroe	David Munroe
T'Shan; The Cannibal	Shuri; Black Panther	T'Channa; Doctor Doom (Note: In the continuity of the Marvel Mangaverse only.)	Jakarra	Hunter; The White Wolf	Dora Milaje	T'Challa Haramu-Fal; Black Panther	Ororo Iquadi Munroe; Storm
Queen Divine Justice; Ce'Athauna Asira Davin	Nakia Shauku; Nakia (Malice)	Okoye	Ngozi; Black Panther	Azari T'Challa T'Chaka; Black Panther
N'Jobu (Note: In the continuity of the Marvel Cinematic Universe only.)	Aneka	Ayo	Xoliswa	Nareema
N'Jadaka; Erik Killmonger / Black Panther	M'Baku; Man-Ape (Note: In the continuity of the Ultimate Marvel imprint only.)	Zola	M'yra	Teela

=== Immediate Family ===
- T'Chaka – T'Challa's father and former King of Wakanda. He was killed by Ulysses Klaw.
- N'Yami – T'Challa's biological mother marries her husband T'Chaka for Bast's approval until she fell ill and died from childbirth.
- Ramonda – T'Challa's caring stepmother and biological mother of Shuri.
- Shuri – T'Challa's half-sister and Ramonda's biological daughter.
- S'Yan – T'Challa's uncle and T'Chaka's brother. He was killed by Doctor Doom's soldiers.
- Azari – Son of Black Panther and Storm and future Black Panther from the Earth-555326 timeline.
- T'Challa II – Son of T'Challa and Nakia from the Marvel Cinematic Universe.
- Jakarra – T'Challa's half-brother.

=== Black Panthers ===
- M'Teli – T'Challa's great grandfather and T'Chanda's predecessor.
- Imandla – T'Challa's great grandmother and Nanali's predecessor.
- T'Chanda – T'Challa's grandfather and T'Chaka's predecessor. He is well known for easily outmatching his ally Captain America and repelling Nazi super-powered invasion forces during their invasion during World War II. Unlike his grandson, Azzuri is more hostile and suspicious of the outside world.
- Benhazin – One of T'Challa's predecessors who took the role of Black Panther. During his reign, he negotiates with the Nigandans to create the Alkama field to help support their people during the drought. However, the Hyena Clan's interference in raiding the crops forces Benhazin to wage conflict against the Nigandans, which he never agreed to. Enraged by this, Benhazin captured the Hyena Clan and banished them from Wakanda. He later annexed the Alkama field from the Nigandans and established the Hatut Zeraze to counteract the Hyena Clan's plan. Benhazin's actions have left his legacy of shattering the relationship with Niganda and affected Hatut Zeraze's corruption by White Wolf.
- Hu'nahn – One of T'Challa's predecessors and one of the many carriers of the generations-old mantle of the Black Panther.
- Mamadou Fall – A Jabari warrior who has served as one of T'Challa's predecessors and one of the many carriers of the generations-old mantle of the Black Panther. He successfully removed Xe'Ntra from the throne during Individual combat and became the first Jabari to take the title of the Black Panther.
- Mosi – Also known as The Black Panther of 1,000,000 BC. He is the first Black Panther chosen by Bast and T'Challa's ancestor who survived the heart-shaped herb fatally. He joins the Avengers of 1,000,000 BC to fight against outside threats such as the Celestials, the Brood, and demons until he dies from his wounds. His death causes the Panther Tribes to live in isolation from the outside world.
- Nehanda – One of T'Challa's predecessors who took the role of Black Panther during the 11th century. A founder of the Dora Milaje, she is the first woman who took the mantle of Black Panther. Under the tutelage of her mentor Zawavari, she is also skilled in magic and sorcery when she manifested the heart-shaped herb as a result. By the time when her mentor was kidnapped, Nehanda used her glamour spell to depart her duty as queen for her absence and continues her rescue mission soon after. She joins the Avengers of the 11th century to prevent the cult from summoning the Atlantean Tyrant, Suma-Ket. Unlike her predecessors, Nehanda is the only Black Panther to remain heirless.
- Negus – One of T'Challa's predecessors who took the role of Black Panther during his time. He is a skilled drummer who used his mystical drum, based on the combination of sound and vibration, to fend off the Jambazi's attempt to resurrect the dead.
- Olumo Bashenga – T'Challa's paternal ancestor. After being granted powers from Bast and serving as a Shaman, he becomes the second known Black Panther who founded the panther cult, establishing a sovereign country and anointed himself as Wakandan's first king after discovering the mounds of Vibranium.
- S'Yan – He took up his role as Black Panther after his brother was killed and chose to concede the throne to his nephew.
- Shuri – She has taken up the role of Black Panther and is currently the ruler of Wakanda after T'Challa was badly injured by Doctor Doom.
- T'Chaka – The father of T'Challa and a former Black Panther. He was killed by Ulysses Klaw.
- T'Konda – One of T'Challa's predecessors.
- Turkana – One of T'Challa's predecessors.
- Xe'Ntra – He took over the throne after Negus until he was deceived by the Hyena Clan when they resurrect his deceased lover, Nanti, and manipulated him into attacking the neighboring nation, Mohannda. He was subsequently defeated by the Jabari warrior Mamadou Fall, resulting in his disgrace by his people.
- Yemandi – Wakandan queen and ancestor of T'Challa in Avengers Assemble.

== Love interests ==
- Monica Lynne – A singer who saved T'Challa from drowning after being bested by Killmonger. His longest love interest, to whom he pledged eternal devotion. They later drifted apart though Lynne was genuinely saddened to hear that T'Challa was marrying Storm. She later died from cancer, but not before seeing her former lover one final time.
- Storm: Ororo Iqadi T'Challa (née Munroe) – A member of the X-Men, she was the Black Panther's wife and Queen of Wakanda. Their marriage was annulled following the "Avengers vs. X-Men" event.

== Supporting characters ==
=== Wakandan inhabitants ===
- Changamire – A former Wakandan philosopher and T'Challa's tutor who was exiled for teaching anti-monarchy which inspires Tetu to commit terrorism. As a pacifist who opposes violence, he later serves as a scholar and later conceded that T'Challa is less tyrannical than he would've expected.
- N'Gassi – T'Challa's former adviser and acting regent when T'Challa departs Wakanda for other missions.
- W'Kabi – T'Challa's competent second-in-command, completely loyal to his liege.
- N'Kano – A Wakandan mutate who was exposed to energized Vibranium from the Vibrasurge Project by accident.
- Zawavari – A Wakandan shaman who assists T'Challa in terms of magical and mystical affairs.
- Zuri – A grumpy and gigantic elderly warrior. A close friend of the late T'Chaka, and one of T'Challa's most trusted advisers.
- Bask - Sister of Bashenga from Avengers: Black Panther's Quest

=== Dora Milaje ===
A group of warrior women who served as Black Panther's professional bodyguards. They are known as the Adored Ones. They are highly skilled in the use of various weapons and styles of martial art.

- Aneka – A former leader of the Dora Milaje and a formidable warrior. She is arrested and put on trial after killing a corrupt tribal chieftain. Aneka and Ayo later become the Midnight Angels and start a revolution in Wakanda.
- Ayo – A former member of the Dora Milaje and a fierce warrior. She and her lover Aneka become the Midnight Angels.
- Okoye – One of the former Dora Milaje, a ceremonial betrothed/bodyguard of T'Challa. Okoye is of the J'Kuwali tribe and acted as a traditional, proper concomitant to the king, speaking only to the king and only in Hausa, an African language widely spoken in Wakanda and thus affording the king and his wives a measure of privacy.
- Midnight Angels – The subgroup of Dora Milaje established their name as a strike force under Shuri's leadership. Having lost faith in T'Challa's leadership, their leader Ayo and Aneka formed their independence to help fight against women's persecution from corrupted men.

=== Wakandan Pantheon ===
- Bast – A Heliopolitan who is known as the Panther God by Wakandans. She was responsible for creating the Black Panther royal lineage and Wakandan monarchy, following the discovery of the Heart-shaped herb and mounds of vibranium. She also formed the Wakandan Pantheons known as the Orisha after banishing the Originators into the Neither-realms. She tests T'Challa's leadership after taking his enhanced powers and abilities.

=== Wakandan Tribes ===
- Jabari Tribes – A tribal cult who are exiled for its destructive actions caused by the White Gorilla Cult. Before the leadership of M'baku and the death of King T'Chaka, they rivaled the Panther cult for dominance resulting in their banishment, and later served as allies for Intergalactic expansion.

=== Other characters ===
- Abner Little – A shrewd businessman and negotiator who aids T'Challa on his quest to recover the mystery of King Solomon's Golden Frogs and his treasures. They later reunite while confronting Zanda for her possession of the frog.
- Everett K. Ross – A U.S. State Department employee, whose job was to escort foreign diplomats onto American soil. His world changed forever when he was assigned to T'Challa, the Black Panther, the ruler of Wakanda.
- Queen Divine Justice – Ce'Athauna Asira Davin is the street-smart queen of the Jabari tribe of Wakanda raised in Chicago and former Dora Milaje of T'Challa. She originally went by the name Chanté Giovanni Brown.
- White Tiger – A former NYPD cop and a vigilante who adopted the moniker of Black Panther and later the White Tiger to fight against crime. T'Challa contacted him for his help in exchange for his training and was respected as his ally.

== Allies ==
- Avengers – T'Challa joins the team after rescuing them from the Grim Reaper and requires their help to reclaim his rightful throne, which he usually spies on them if they are trustworthy. He occasionally departs the team for his responsibility of protecting Wakanda from outside threats as king before rejoining them. T'Challa is best known as the first black superhero to join the team.
- Captain America – A super soldier and leader of the Avengers who is aware of Wakandan society. He was known to have carried his shield that contains vibranium and made his alliance with T'Challa's grandfather, Azzuri the Wise.
- Fantastic Four – T'Challa tests the Fantastic Four for their skills and respected them as friends after defeating Klaw and Doctor Doom.
- Gentle – A Wakandan mutant with the ability to gain enhanced strength via a temporary increase of his muscle mass. He was shunned and outcast by his people, including his mother, because of his father, an outsider. Unlike other Wakandans, T'Challa has shown sympathy for his condition and secretly entrusted him to work as his sleeper agent.
- Illuminati – A secret society that tends to make difficult decisions. During their formation, T'Challa refuses to join them because of his distrust of their self-righteous attitude and lack of consequence. He was later forced to join them because of the multiversal colliding.
- Iron Man – A billionaire of Stark Industries with genius level intelligence of technological enhancement.
- Manifold – An Australian mutant with the ability to teleport. He helps T'Challa and his allies face the revolt that could decimate the Wakandan society.
- Photon – A member of the Avengers who can turn into living energy.
- Spider-Man – A New York superhero with spider powers.
- X-Men – A group of mutant superheroes who helps protect both humans and mutants alike.

== Enemies ==
The following are the known enemies of Black Panther:

- Achebe (later known as Reverend Achebe) – A poor farmer from somewhere in South Africa, Achebe sold his soul to the demon Mephisto. He is portrayed as a grinning, unpredictable, lunatic, warrior-mystic, regularly talking to his hand-puppet Daki with delusions that it is alive.
- Baron Macabre – A powerful mystic who can summon and control zombies.
- Batroc the Leaper – A mercenary and enemy of Captain America who once accompanied Klaw in his invasion of Wakanda.
- Black Knight – Augustine du Lac is a Vatican operative who came across the Ebony Blade and had his own Aragorn. He accompanied Klaw in his invasion of Wakanda.
- Cannibal – A psychic parasite who accompanied Klaw in his invasion of Wakanda.
- Desturi – A group of xenophobic conservation criminal organization who prefers to live the old tradition of isolation. With Doctor Doom's aid, they successfully overthrow the Wakandan throne forcing T'Challa to retake the throne with the help of the X-Men and Dora Milaje.
- Doctor Doom – The archenemy of Fantastic Four and the ruler of Latveria. He plays his role by implanting nanites on Wakandans for infiltration and manipulating the Desturi into taking over Wakanda and seeking to take Vibranium for himself resulting in DoomWar.
- Erik Killmonger – A powerful warrior and strategic genius in politics and economics is T'Challa's archenemy.
- Hyena Clan – A group of extremist sects consisting of nomadic thieves and scavengers. They are known to commit several terrorist acts throughout Wakandan history which include the strained relationship with the Nigandan people and the manipulation of King Xe'Ntra to wage war on Mohannda.
- Jakarra – A military general who sought to take over the Wakandan throne as the rightful king. During his attempted coup, he transforms into a mutated monster when he accidentally exposed himself to the amount of Vibranium.
- Kiber the Cruel – A scientist who gained the ability to absorb the psionic consciousness/life forces of human beings.
- Klaw – Murderer and betrayer of T'Chaka and the other archenemy of T'Challa who can control sound.
- Kraven the Hunter – A hunter and enemy of Spider-Man who has fought Black Panther on occasion.
- K'vvr – A Skrull commander in charge of their invasion of Wakanda.
- Lord Karnaj – A mercenary who uses experimental firearms and worked with Killmonger to overthrow T'Challa.
- Madam Slay – An ally and lover of Erik Killmonger who has the power to control leopards.
- Malice – A Wakandan mutate with superhuman strength, speed, and agility. She is a former Dora Milaje (ceremonial betrothed/bodyguard) of T'Challa.
- Man-Ape – Ruler of the Jabari Tribe, a recognized micronation within Wakanda's borders. Founding member of the "Pan African Congress on the Treatment of Superhumans".
- Mephisto – An extra-dimensional Demon who plans to corrupt souls and torment innocent lives. He plays his part in corrupting Nakia and Achebe to torment T'Challa's life.
- Namor – Namor the Sub-Mariner is the ruler of undersea Atlantis. Black Panther has a long-time rivalry with Namor. After being possessed by the Phoenix Force, Namor was responsible for releasing tsunami waves destroying Wakandan Areas which causes a strained relationship between them.
- Radioactive Man – Igor Stancheck is a Russian mutate who once accompanied Klaw in his invasion of Wakanda.
- Rhino – A rhinoceros-themed villain and enemy of Spider-Man who once accompanied Klaw in his invasion of Wakanda.
- Tetu – An exiled Wakandan and a rebel leader of the Nigandan terrorist army with powers of nature manipulation. Tetu is an anti-monarchist whose goal is to overthrow the Wakandan monarchy and sought to liberate Wakanda as a nation without rulers.
- Venomm – A man who can control the behavior of snakes through training, chemicals, and some form of psionic influence
- Princess Zanda – Zanda was the ruler of the African nation of Narobia and the potential love interest of T'Challa.
- White Wolf – T'Challa's adopted elder brother and the former leader of the Hatut Zeraze, the espionage elite police of Wakanda.
- Windeagle – A villain who wears an anti-gravity costume that enabled him to fly and glide on wind currents.
- Zenzi – A Wakandan empath originates from Niganda with powers of mind manipulation. Zenzi possesses the ability to read and control the emotions of others like bringing out the anger of fellow Wakandans. She supports Tetu's goal of overthrowing T'Challa and later became Bast's new host.
