= White Wolf (comics) =

Publication information
- Publisher: Marvel Comics
- First appearance: Black Panther Vol. 3 #4 (February 1999)
- Created by: Christopher Priest; Mark Texeira

In-story information
- Alter ego: Hunter
- Species: Human
- Place of origin: Earth
- Team affiliations: Hatut Zeraze
- Notable aliases: White Wolf
- Abilities: Vibranium microweave mesh; Suit granting cloaking ability; Hand-to-hand combattant

White Wolf is a character appearing in American comic books published by Marvel Comics. Created by writer Christopher Priest and artist Mark Texeira, the character first appeared in Black Panther vol. 3 #4 (February 1999). Hunter is known under the codename White Wolf. He is the adopted brother of the superheroes T'Challa/Black Panther and Shuri, as well as the leader of Wakanda's secret police, the Hatut Zeraze. The character is an anti hero who has been a mercenary and a defender of Wakanda at multiple points in his history.

== Publication history ==
Hunter debuted in Black Panther vol. 3 #4 (February 1999), created by Christopher Priest and Mark Texeira. He appeared in the 2021 Black Panther Legends series, the 2022 Captain America: Symbol of Truth series, the 2022 Captain America: Sentinel of Liberty series, and in the 2023 Captain America: Cold War Alpha one-shot.

== Fictional character biography ==
After his parents died in a plane crash in Wakanda, Hunter was adopted by King T'Chaka. Being a white foreigner, Hunter was viewed with suspicion and even contempt by the cautious Wakandans. Despite this, he developed a true love for Wakanda as one of his adopted homeland's staunchest patriots. Hunter knew he would never ascend to the throne with T'Challa as the true heir and, feeling cheated, developed deep jealousy for him. He drove himself to be the best Wakandan possible in an attempt to upstage his adopted brother, becoming the leader of the Hatut Zeraze, the secret police of Wakanda.

When the current Black Panther disbands the Hatut Zeraze due to their brutality, White Wolf and his subordinates leave Wakanda to work as mercenaries. Though resentful of this situation, White Wolf still harbors a love for his adopted home country and agrees to aid Black Panther when necessary.

Hunter became displeased that T'Challa abdicated the Wakandan throne to protect Hell's Kitchen, Manhattan (T'Challa's goal was to test himself after recent losses and Matt Murdock needed time to heal after recent events). In retaliation, he killed some people to take the Black Panther mantle from T'Challa. When Black Panther defeated White Wolf, he was told that Wakanda has no place for murderers.

When Wakanda transitioned into a parliamentary democracy, White Wolf sows discord in Wakanda by taking advantage of the "Wakanda Forever" movement and infecting immigrants to Wakanda with a bioweapon he obtained. White Wolf is defeated by Captain America and Nomad (Ian Rogers) and remanded to the Mohanndan prison.

White Wolf seizes power in Dimension Z and allows the dimension's power to corrupt him, transforming him into a humanoid white wolf. He forms a tentative alliance with Bucky Barnes, who he betrays in a bid to gain more power. White Wolf is ultimately thwarted by Captain America and Falcon.

== Powers and abilities ==
White Wolf is an expert at hand-to-hand combat. His suit is made of vibranium mesh and possesses a special cloaking technology. His costume stops bullets in mid-flight, is immune to slashes, and can double as a business suit. It incorporates boots with energy-dampening abilities, and an assortment of handguns and other weapons.

== Reception ==
Chase Magnett of ComicBook.com described White Wolf as one of the best Black Panther villains and expressed interest in seeing the character in a Marvel film. Peter Eckhardt of Comic Book Resources (CBR) called White Wolf one of the most iconic villains of Black Panther. Darby Harn of Screen Rant named White Wolf one of the best Black Panther characters missing from the Marvel Cinematic Universe and described him as fascinating.

== In other media ==
- Hunter / White Wolf appears in Avengers Assemble, voiced by Scott Porter. This version is a former student of N'Jadaka. He assists Black Panther and Shuri in fighting the Shadow Council before he is killed by Tiger Shark in retaliation for Bask attacking Atlantis.
- Hunter / White Wolf appears as a playable character in Lego Marvel's Avengers as part of the Black Panther expansion pack.
