= Malice (Nakia Shauku) =

Publication information
- Publisher: Marvel Comics
- First appearance: Nakia Shauku: Black Panther vol. 3 #1 (November 1998); Nakia Cabral: Black Panther vol. 7 #1 (May 2018)
- Created by: Nakia Shauku: Christopher Priest Mark Texeira; Nakia Cabral: Ta-Nehisi Coates; Daniel Acuña

In-story information
- Alter ego: Nakia Shauku; Nakia Cabral
- Species: Human mutate
- Team affiliations: Dora Milaje (Nakia Shauku); Intergalactic Empire of Wakanda (Nakia Cabral)
- Abilities: Superhuman strength, speed, agility, and accuracy; Expert hand-to-hand combatant; Equipments include a barbed blade and a projectile blade launcher

Malice (Nakia Shauku) (/ˈnɑːkiə/), originally known mononymously simply as Nakia, is a supervillain appearing in American comic books published by Marvel Comics. Created by Christopher Priest and Mark Texeira, first appearing in Black Panther vol. 3 #1 (November 1998), the character was raised as one of the wives-in-training for T'Challa; after being rejected by the king due to being 14, she plots to kill his girlfriend, for which she is banished from Wakanda, before dedicating the rest of her adult life to hunting down every woman in T'Challa's orbit, taking over the name of Malice from a former enemy of the king, eventually dying after plotting to kill T'Challa's ex-wife Ororo Munroe.

Lupita Nyong'o portrays an unrelated character named Nakia named after Nakia Shauku in the Marvel Cinematic Universe films Black Panther (2018) and its sequels Black Panther: Wakanda Forever (2022) and Black Panther III, depicted as the morally good lover of T'Challa and a former member of the Dora Milaje who is the same age as him, and eventually bears his son, T'Challa II. Synergetic with the MCU, a character based on Nyong'o's portrayal named Nakia Cabral, an imperial in the House of Tafari of the Intergalactic Empire of Wakanda, created by Ta-Nehisi Coates and Daniel Acuña, was introduced to the main Earth-616 continuity in Black Panther vol. 7 #1 (May 2018), forming a romance with T'Challa before she too is killed.

== Publication history ==
Nakia Shauku was introduced in Black Panther vol. 3 #1 (Nov. 1998) and was created by Christopher Priest and Mark Texeira, while Nakia Cabral was introduced in Black Panther vol. 7 #1 (May 2018) and was created by Ta-Nehisi Coates and Daniel Acuña, based on Lupita Nyong'o's MCU character.

== Fictional character biography ==
=== Nakia Shauku ===
As a child, Nakia of the Q'Noma Valley marsh tribe was picked by her tribal elders to be Wakandan Dora Milaje, "Adored Ones" or wives-in-training and spent three years training before being presented to King T'Challa; at 14, barely a teenager, she was instantly smitten with him, although he stated that her role was purely ceremonial, due to being disinterested in sleeping with teenagers. She became close friends with her fellow Dora Milaje, Okoye who, unlike her, took satisfaction with being just his bodyguard. Nakia's obsession with King T'Challa increased dramatically when Mephisto cast an illusion over T'Challa causing him to kiss Nakia. She consequently became jealous of T'Challa's American ex-girlfriend Monica Lynne and plotted to kill her, but T'Challa rescued her and banished Nakia bringing great shame on her tribe and Wakanda.

Nakia was captured by Achebe and tortured by him until Erik Killmonger came and freed her. Killmonger used the Altar of Resurrection on her and in the process gained enhanced abilities. Killmonger decided to name her Malice after the previous one. She went after T'Challa and his female allies and while battling Queen Divine Justice, killed one of T'Challa's allies, Nicole "Nikki" Adams.

Nakia and Man-Ape kidnap several of T'Challa's friends, poisoning them out of revenge. Nakia also plans on killing Monica and Dakota North, believing that the latter was also one of T'Challa's lovers. In the end, T'Challa foils the plan of Nakia, who manages to escape but not without giving him the antidote for his friends.

When Everett K. Ross is captured and tortured by the Hatut Zeraze, Nakia steps in to rescue him. Despite this, she is still in exile from the Dora Milaje. Embittered and cast out, Nakia developed an arsenal of weapons, including an herb called jufeiro that gives her power over men. However, longtime use of the drug makes her severely ill. In a desperate attempt to lure Black Panther to her before she dies, Nakia tracks down the Mimic-27, a transforming weapon used by the Dora Milaje.

Nakia sends Mimic-27 after T'Challa's ex-wife, Ororo Munroe (aka Storm of the X-Men), but the weapon breaks free of Nakia's control and attacks her. The Dora Milaje request Nakia's aid in stopping the Mimic, but she refuses to act until she can see her king again. While the heroes of New York battle Mimic's doppelgängers, Nakia and the Dora Milaje battle the Mimic itself, which is tainted with Nakia's malignance. Nakia overcomes her mirror reflection and finally quells Mimic, but dies without Mimic to sustain her. Nakia is returned to Wakanda and given a proper burial, which is attended by Black Panther, Spider-Man, the X-Men, and the Avengers.

=== Nakia Cabral ===
Nakia Cabral, based on Lupita Nyong'o's MCU portrayal, was introduced in Black Panther vol. 7 as a defector from the Intergalactic Empire of Wakanda who becomes allied and romantically involved with the time-displaced T'Challa. After she sacrifices herself to save T'Challa's life, T'Challa erects a monument in her honour.

== Powers and abilities ==
Due a magical ritual, both Nakias possesses a superhuman level of strength, speed, agility, and accuracy. As a member of the Dora Milaje, both Nakias are expert hand-to-hand combatant. Both use a barbed blade and a projectile blade launcher.

== Reception ==
=== Critical response ===
Following the creation of Nakia Cabral, CinemaBlend included Nakia Shauku in their "5 Marvel Villains We'd Love To See In Black Panther 2" list, ComicBook.com included her in their "7 Great Villains for Black Panther 2" list, and Darby Harn of Screen Rant included her in their "10 Best Black Panther Comics Characters Not In The MCU" list. De'Angelo Epps of CBR.com ranked Nakia 9th in their "Marvel: Ranking Black Panther's Rogues Gallery" list.

== In other media ==
=== Television ===
Nakia / Malice makes a non-speaking cameo appearance in the Avengers: Earth's Mightiest Heroes episode "Welcome to Wakanda" as a member of the Dora Milaje.

=== Marvel Cinematic Universe ===
Lupita Nyong'o as Nakia in a character poster for the 2018 film Black Panther.

An original character named Nakia after Nakia Shauku appears in media set in the Marvel Cinematic Universe (MCU), portrayed by Lupita Nyong'o, with Nyong'o's character then loosely adapted back to the Black Panther comic book series as Nakia Cabral. This version hails from Wakanda's River Tribe, is a former Dora Milaje who became a War Dog, an international spy for Wakanda, and was previously in a relationship with T'Challa, who in this continuity is the same age as her instead of being much older.

- She first appears in the film Black Panther (2018). Following the death of his father T'Chaka, T'Challa brings Nakia back to Wakanda to accompany him as he is crowned the new king and on a mission to capture Ulysses Klaue. After Killmonger arrives in Wakanda and seemingly kills T'Challa for Wakanda's throne, Nakia recovers a heart-shaped herb and accompanies T'Challa's sister Shuri, mother Ramonda, and acquaintance Everett K. Ross in an attempt to enlist M'Baku's help in overthrowing Killmonger despite Ramonda's pleas for her to ingest the herb. However, they find a comatose T'Challa and revive him before joining him in retaking Wakanda. Following Killmonger's defeat, Nakia and T'Challa rekindle their relationship and she accepts a new position running a Wakandan outreach center in California.
- As of the film Black Panther: Wakanda Forever, Nyong'o stated that Nakia has "matured" after the Blip and the death of T'Challa, explaining that her character's "priorities have shifted and sharpened", while adding that she still remains "the one you want to call when you're in trouble". Following the aforementioned events, Nakia moved to Haiti to secretly raise her and T'Challa's son, Toussaint, away from the pressures of living in Wakanda.
- An alternate universe variant of Nakia appears in the What If…? episode "What If… the Hulk Fought the Mech Avengers?", voiced by Brittany Adebumola. This version joined the Avengers in their struggle against the Apex and its gamma monsters.
- Nyong'o will return as Nakia in Black Panther III, revolving around her son, T'Challa II, taking on the mantle of Black Panther.

=== Video games ===
- Nakia appears in Lego Marvel Super Heroes 2, as part of the "Black Panther" DLC.
- Nakia appears in Marvel Snap.
