= Okoye (character) =

Publication information
- Publisher: Marvel Comics
- First appearance: Black Panther (vol. 3) #1 (November 1998)
- Created by: Christopher Priest (writer); Mark Texeira (artist)

In-story information
- Species: Human
- Place of origin: Wakanda, Africa
- Team affiliations: Agents of Wakanda; Midnight Angels; Dora Milaje; Avengers
- Supporting character of: Black Panther
- Abilities: Master martial artist and hand-to-hand combatant; Master tactician, strategist, and field commander

Okoye is a superhero appearing in American comic books published by Marvel Comics. Created by writer Christopher Priest and artist Mark Texeira, the character first appeared in Black Panther (vol. 3) #1 (November 1998). Okoye is the General of the special forces for the fictional African nation of Wakanda called Dora Milaje.

Danai Gurira portrays the character in the Marvel Cinematic Universe films Black Panther (2018), Avengers: Infinity War (2018), Avengers: Endgame (2019), Black Panther: Wakanda Forever (2022), and the Disney+ animated series What If...? (2021).

== Publication history ==
Okoye debuted in Black Panther (vol. 3) #1 (November 1998), created by Christopher Priest and Mark Texeira. She last appeared in Black Panther (vol. 3) #62 in 2003 until returning in Black Panther (vol. 6) #171 (2018), by Ta-Nehisi Coates. She appeared in the 2018 Amazing Spider-Man: Wakanda Forever one-shot, the 2019 Black Panther and the Agents of Wakanda series, and the 2024 Ultimate Black Panther series.

== Fictional character biography ==
Okoye joined alongside her friend Nakia to be among T'Challa's wives-in-training. However, when Okoye discovered that T'Challa had no interest in marrying either of them, she immediately came to accept this. She has since stood at T'Challa's side. Okoye accompanied T'Challa when he recruited Queen Divine Justice. She was also with T'Challa when they tested Kasper Cole on whether he was worthy of the Black Panther garb. Okoye tested Kasper if he would stay with his pregnant girlfriend or leave her for Okoye.

Okoye later appears as the director of the Agents of Wakanda.

During the "Empyre" storyline, Okoye is among those who help battle the Cotati invasion. While on the Wakandan Helicarrier, she detects plant-based activity in the Savage Land. She later assists the Thing, Shuri, and the Agents of Wakanda in fighting the Cotati when they breach Wakanda's forcefield.

== Powers and abilities ==
Okoye is highly skilled in multiple forms of combat, being the leader and General of the Dora Milaje. She is exceptional in using various Wakandan weaponry and tools, especially skilled in the use of spears. Okoye is a great tactician and military strategist.

== Reception ==
George Marston of Newsarama described Okoye as a standout character from the '90s, saying that Danai Gurira's portrayal of Okoye in the Marvel Cinematic Universe has made her a household name, and concluding that her journey to stardom began in 1998 and continues to rise. Deirdre Kaye of Scary Mommy called Sabra a "role model" and a "truly heroic" female character. Thayer Preece of Comic Book Resources called Okoye a fan favorite character.

== Other versions ==
- An alternate universe version of Okoye from Earth-16220 appears in Spidey: School's Out.
- An alternate universe version of Okoye from Earth-6160 appears in the Ultimate Universe imprint. This version is a former Dora Milaje and T'Challa's wife.

== In other media ==
=== Television ===
- Okoye makes a non-speaking cameo appearance in The Avengers: Earth's Mightiest Heroes episode "Welcome to Wakanda".
- Okoye appears in Lego Marvel Super Heroes: Black Panther – Trouble in Wakanda, voiced by Yvette Nicole Brown.
- Okoye makes a non-speaking cameo appearance in the X-Men '97 episode "Tolerance is Extinction – Part 3".

=== Marvel Cinematic Universe ===
Danai Gurira portrays Okoye in media set in the Marvel Cinematic Universe. This version is a general of the Dora Milaje and the wife of W'Kabi.

- In the live-action film Black Panther, she works with T'Challa to capture Ulysses Klaue. When Erik "Killmonger" Stevens seemingly kills T'Challa in a trial by combat for Wakanda's throne, Okoye and the Dora Milaje are forced to serve him due to their loyalty to the throne. When T'Challa returns alive and Killmonger refuses to abide by the trial's rules, Okoye leads the Dora Milaje in helping T'Challa overthrow him.
- In the live-action film Avengers: Infinity War, Okoye joins the Wakandans and the Avengers in fighting Thanos' forces. She survives the Blip, but is horrified to witness T'Challa and half of the Wakandans fall victim to it.
- In the live-action film Avengers: Endgame, Okoye begins working with the Avengers through Natasha Romanoff, reporting to her and monitoring issues in Wakanda. After the Avengers undo the Blip, Okoye joins them in fighting an alternate timeline variant of Thanos and later attends Tony Stark's funeral.
- Alternate timeline variants of Okoye appear in the Disney+ animated series What If...?, voiced by Danai Gurira in the first season and by Kenna Ramsey in the episode "What If... the Emergence Destroyed the Earth?".
- In the live-action film Black Panther: Wakanda Forever, Okoye joins Shuri in finding Riri Williams after Namor threatens Wakanda, but is defeated and stripped of her rank. Despite this, Okoye continues to defend Wakanda and later receives the "Midnight Angel" armor from Shuri to defeat Attuma in combat and rescue Everett K. Ross.
- A zombie version of Okoye appears in the animated series Marvel Zombies, following her appearance in the What If...? episode "What If... Zombies?!", voiced again by Kenna Ramsey.

=== Video games ===
- Okoye appears as a playable character in Lego Marvel Super Heroes 2 as part of the "Black Panther" DLC.
- Okoye appears as a playable character in Marvel Avengers Academy, voiced by Bindy Cody.
- Okoye appears as a playable character in Marvel Puzzle Quest.
- Okoye appears as a playable character in Marvel Strike Force.
- Okoye appears in Marvel's Avengers, voiced by Debra Wilson.
- Okoye appears as a playable character in Marvel Future Fight.
- Okoye appears as a playable character in Marvel Contest of Champions.

=== Miscellaneous ===
- In 2019, HeroClix released an Okoye action figure inspired by the Marvel Cinematic Universe (MCU) incarnation of the character.
- Okoye appears in the table top game Marvel Crisis Protocol.
- The MCU incarnation of Okoye appears as a meet and greet character at Disney Cruise Line.
