= T'Channa =

Publication information
- Publisher: Marvel Comics
- First appearance: Marvel Mangaverse #3 (June 2002)
- Created by: Ben Dunn

In-story information
- Alter ego: Doctor Doom
- Notable aliases: Victor Von Doom
- Abilities: Magic user

T'Channa is a fictional character appearing in American comic books published by Marvel Comics. Created by Ben Dunn, the character first appeared in Marvel Mangaverse #3 (June 2002). T'Channa is the princess of the fictional African nation of Wakanda. She is the younger sister of T'Challa, who is the king of Wakanda and the Black Panther. She becomes the apprentice and successor of Doctor Doom.

== Publication history ==
The character was introduced in Marvel Mangaverse #3 (June 2002) and was created by Ben Dunn, whose work is best known on the comic series Ninja High School. The Marvel Mangaverse series combines aspects of the standard Marvel Universe with the aesthetic of manga. Shuri, a sister of T'Challa in the mainstream Marvel Universe, created by writer Reginald Hudlin and artist John Romita Jr. first appears in Black Panther vol. 4 #2 (May 2005). Unlike her Mangaverse counterpart, Shuri is a hero and becomes her brother's successor as Black Panther. On Earth-2149, featured in the Marvel Zombies series, T'Challa has a son with Lisa Hendricks named T'Channa. T'Channa was created by Robert Kirkman and Sean Phillips.

== Fictional character biography ==
T'Channa is the sister of T'Challa from Earth-2301, T'Channa loses the title of Black Panther to T'Challa, she goes to Latveria, there she meets Doctor Doom, he makes her his disciple, soon after she betrays him, sending her to another dimension and assuming the identity of Doctor Doom.

== Powers and abilities ==
T'Channa is a powerful user of magic.

== Reception ==
- In 2022, Screen Rant included T'Channa in their "15 Most Powerful Black Panther Villains" list, and in their "10 Best Black Panther Comics Characters Not In The MCU" list.
