= Achebe (character) =

Marvel Comics supervillain

- Achebe in Deadpool Vol. 2, #43 (August 2000). Art by Jim Calafiore.

Publication information
- Publisher: Marvel Comics
- First appearance: Black Panther Vol. 2, #3 (January 1999)
- Created by: Christopher Priest (writer); Mark Texeira (artist)

In-story information
- Alter ego: Reverend Doctor Michael Ibn al-hajj Achebe
- Species: Human
- Place of origin: Ghudaza, Africa
- Partnerships: Mephisto
- Notable aliases: Bob
- Abilities: Genius-level intellect; Political strategist; Skilled acrobat

Achebe is a supervillain appearing in American comic books published by Marvel Comics. Created by Christopher Priest and Mark Texeira, the character first appeared in Black Panther Vol. 2, #3. Achebe is a recurring enemy of the superhero Black Panther.

== Development ==
=== Concept and creation ===
Creator Christopher Priest stated that the character was inspired by the Joker, Hannibal Lecter, and Hans Gruber. Priest has stated that he is "the Joker to [Black] Panther's Batman."

=== Publication history ===
Achebe was mentioned in Black Panther Vol. 2, #2. He debuted in issues #3-5, #8-13, #22-23, and #36-37. He appeared in Deadpool Vol. 2, #43-44. He appeared in All-New Official Handbook of the Marvel Universe #1. He appeared in Official Handbook of the Marvel Universe A-Z #1.

== Fictional character biography ==
Achebe's origin and past is vague, but is assumed and believed by the United States government that he was a Ghudazan farmer nicknamed "Bob" who tended to leftist rebels from the neighboring country of Ujanka when the men were driven across the Ghudazan/Ujankan border and onto Achebe's property. The soldiers repaid Achebe's kindness by leaving him for dead after they seduced his wife, razed his farm, and stabbed him thirty-two times. According to urban legends, Achebe survived by selling his soul to Mephisto. Then, he went on to kill everyone who had ever interacted with his wife, destroying the homes of his victims and stabbing each one thirty-two times.

After attending Yale Law School, Achebe returned to Ghudazan where he helped instigate an ethnic war. When Black Panther established a refugee camp on the outskirts of Wakanda for those seeking asylum from the conflict, Achebe infiltrated it and exacerbated unease between the refugees and the Wakandans. Achebe then lured Black Panther out of Wakanda by corrupting one of his charities situated in America and by having the organization's "poster children" killed.

While Black Panther is preoccupied in the United States, Achebe leads an uprising in the African refugee camp and appoints himself head of the provisional government that overtakes Wakanda. Achebe subjects Wakanda to his deranged decrees, which worsen after his connection to Mephisto is severed by the cunning of Black Panther. Achebe's forces weaken without Mephisto's backing, though he retains his position as prime minister by promising to share power with Black Panther's stepmother, Ramonda, so long as Black Panther remains in America. Achebe later tries to assassinate Black Panther by having his allies in the United States place a bomb on a bystander and a remotely controllable exoskeleton on Black Panther's ex-fiancée, Monica. Black Panther is able to defuse the explosive and free Monica from the exoskeleton with the help of the Avengers.

As Achebe prepares to be crowned king of Wakanda, and begins conversing with a hand puppet named Daki, Black Panther works on unraveling the conspiracy that helped Achebe instigate the Ghudazan conflict that allowed him and his backers to attain power in Wakanda. While Ramonda is distracted, Achebe knocks her out and acquires her codes for the Prowlers, the robotic defenders of Wakanda. Achebe unleashes the reprogrammed Prowlers, covers himself in explosives, and confronts Black Panther and his friend Everett K. Ross when they reach Wakanda. Achebe forces Black Panther and Ross into a deathtrap based on a claw machine, which they later escape from, while he flees Wakanda.

Achebe resurfaces in America, where he hires Deadpool to steal Preyy, the pet spotted leopard of Erik Killmonger, the current Black Panther. By doing this, Achebe hoped to goad T'Challa into coming out of his self-imposed exile to reclaim the title of Black Panther.

== Powers and abilities ==
Along with being empowered by Mephisto, Achebe is a very psychological and manipulative villain. A rebel anarchist, brilliant schemer, top tier political strategist, and planner. He is also a highly skilled acrobat with exceptional agility. However, Achebe is slightly weakened by his mental instability and obsessive detestation of Black Panther.

== Reception ==
=== Critical response ===
Matt Wood of CinemaBlend included Achebe in their "5 Marvel Villains We'd Love To See In Black Panther 2" list. Darby Harn of Screen Rant included Achebe in their "15 Most Powerful Black Panther Villains" list, and in their "15 Best Black Panther Comics Characters Not In The MCU" list. De'Angelo Epps of Comic Book Resources ranked Achebe 5th in their "Marvel: Ranking Black Panther's Rogues Gallery" list, writing, "Many look at Achebe as one of the most iconic villains of the Black Panther. He is a creation of one of the Black Panther's best writers, Christopher Priest and many fans call him "The Joker of the Black Panther." Which speaks volumes to his icon status in the comic series. Achebe has a great taste for murder and cruelty with a master's in manipulation. This silver tongued snake is one of the greatest threats there is to Wakanda," while Peter Eckhardt ranked him 12th in their "10 Most Iconic Black Panther Villains" list. Chase Magnett of ComicBook.com ranked Achebe 6th in their "8 Best Black Panther Villains" list.

== Other versions ==
=== The Once and Future King ===
Achebe is among the villains recruited by T'Charra to help him kill and usurp his father, an elderly Black Panther. Achebe and the other criminals are defeated by Black Panther's allies Brother Voodoo, Falcon, and Luke Cage.
