= Shuri (character) =

Fictional superhero appearing in American comic books published by Marvel Comics

- Textless variant cover of Black Panther #1 (May 2018). Art by Stanley Lau.

Publication information
- Publisher: Marvel Comics
- First appearance: As Shuri: Black Panther #2 (May 2005); As Black Panther: Black Panther #1 (April 2009)
- Created by: Reginald Hudlin; John Romita Jr.

In-story information
- Alter ego: Shuri
- Species: Human mutate
- Place of origin: Wakanda
- Team affiliations: Avengers; Guardians of the Galaxy; Daughters of Liberty; Panther Cult
- Partnerships: T'Challa
- Notable aliases: Black Panther; Aja-Adanna; Princess; Griot
- Abilities: Genius-level intellect; The power to draw upon the knowledge, strength and every experience of every previous Black Panther; Enhanced strength, speed, agility, reflexes, durability, healing stamina and senses; Expert martial artist; Utilizing vibranium suit and equipment; Animal empathy; Animorphism

Black Panther / Aja-Adanna (Princess Shuri) is a superheroine appearing in American comic books published by Marvel Comics. Created by writer Reginald Hudlin and artist John Romita Jr., the character first appeared in Black Panther vol. 4 #2 (May 2005). Shuri is the princess of the fictional African nation of Wakanda. She is the daughter of T'Chaka and younger sister of T'Challa, who is the king of Wakanda and the Black Panther, an earned title and rank given to the paramount chief of the nation.

In a 2009 story line, T'Challa is injured, and Shuri is tested and found suitable for the role of Black Panther. She possesses all the enhanced abilities given to the Black Panther via an ancient Wakandan ritual, is a skilled martial artist, allowed access to extensive advanced technologies and wealth, and uses learned transmorphic capabilities.

Letitia Wright portrays the character in the Marvel Cinematic Universe films Black Panther (2018), Avengers: Infinity War (2018), Avengers: Endgame (2019), Black Panther: Wakanda Forever (2022) and the upcoming Avengers: Doomsday (2026) starring in the latter film as the new Black Panther due to the death of T'Challa's actor Chadwick Boseman. Additionally, Ozioma Akagha voices two younger alternate timeline versions of the character in the Disney+ MCU animated series What If...?

== Publication history ==
In Marvel Mangaverse, a manga-like universe, T'Challa had a younger sister named T'Channa. This character, created by Ben Dunn, was introduced in Marvel Mangaverse #3 (June 2002). Unlike her counterpart in the mainstream Marvel Universe, T'Channa is a villain and becomes a successor to Doctor Doom.

Created by writer Reginald Hudlin and artist John Romita Jr., Shuri first appeared in Black Panther vol. 4 #2 (May 2005). The character, originally written as the princess of Wakanda and a supporting character in stories featuring her older brother, T'Challa, trains to succeed him as the Black Panther and ruler of Wakanda. In 2024, Hudlin commented,

When I wrote Black Panther I created Shuri so both my son and daughter could dress as the character for Halloween. After the movie debuted, a third of the kids at their elementary school, of all races, came as Black Panther or Shuri.

— Reginald Hudlin

In 2009, after T'Challa is wounded during a battle, Shuri is given the chance to become the Black Panther and proves to be both a skilled warrior and a wise leader.

In 2018, Marvel published her first solo series, Shuri, written by Nnedi Okorafor, a coming of age story which focused on Shuri dealing with her brother being absent from the throne while exploring her leadership and interests.

On July 9, 2020, Marvel and its partners at Scholastic announced a new original graphic novel starring Shuri is on the way from New York Times bestselling author Roseanne A. Brown.

== Fictional character biography ==
The princess of Wakanda, Shuri is T'Chaka's youngest child and only daughter. From a very young age, Shuri coveted the Black Panther mantle. She attempts to challenge the then-Black Panther, her uncle S'Yan, for the mantle, only to discover that he had already been defeated by her older half-brother T'Challa. During an attack on Wakanda by Klaw and a group of his mercenaries, she uses the Ebony Blade to defeat Radioactive Man, killing him in the process. Because she is shell-shocked by her first kill, T'Challa promises to train her in hand-to-hand combat, enabling her to fight on her own terms should she ever need to take his place as leader of Wakanda.

While T'Challa and his wife Queen Ororo are away as members of the Fantastic Four, American battleships aligned with Erik Killmonger moved in on Wakanda. With their King away, Shuri and her advisers decide to sneak onto the ships in the night and incapacitate them. During the raid Shuri is captured by Killmonger's men and thrown in a cell. She challenges Killmonger himself to a fight but, seeing her as beneath him, he sends a group of his men to battle her. She defeats them easily and is broken out of her cell by Zuri, one of T'Challa's advisers. After T'Challa and Ororo leave the Fantastic Four and return to Wakanda, the Skrulls invade Wakanda as a part of Secret Invasion. Shuri and S'Yan lead most of the Wakandan army on an assault against the invading Skrulls, while T'Challa and Ororo battle their leaders.

Prince Namor of Atlantis attempts to recruit T'Challa for the Cabal, a secret council of supervillains run by Doctor Doom. He rejects the offer but is attacked by the various members, and is left in a comatose state. Queen Ororo nominates Shuri as his successor, and she successfully completes the various trials, granting herself access to the heart-shaped herb. However, when she consumes the herb, Bast rejects her due to her jealousy and arrogance. When Morlun threatens to annihilate Wakanda entirely, Shuri takes on the Black Panther identity and outfit regardless, and manages to save Wakanda and resurrect her comatose brother. Through her humble act of self-sacrifice she earns the mantle of Bast, who grants her its accompanying powers.

When a now powerless T'Challa discovers that Doctor Doom infected many Wakandan officials and advisers with nanites, he goes off in search of a way to stop him, leaving Shuri as acting ruler of Wakanda. Shuri tracks down and fights Namor, trying to discover for herself what part he played in her brother's injuries. Together, T'Challa and Shuri discover that the infected Wakandans, calling themselves the Desturi, intend to stage a revolution, seizing power in Wakanda for themselves.

With Doctor Doom's Desturi successfully overthrowing the incumbent Wakandan government as seen in the Doomwar storyline, he finds himself with access to the world's largest supply of vibranium. Shuri and a re-powered T'Challa, who were able to avoid infection from Doom's nanites due to their heightened senses, remain the only Wakandans not under Doom's control. They team up with Colossus, Nightcrawler, and Wolverine of the X-Men to regain control in Wakanda. They succeed, but Doom steals a large portion of the vibranium. Shuri travels the globe, attempting to destroy Doom's criminal network and recover the stolen vibranium. Doom uses vibranium's inherent mystical qualities to take control of all processed vibranium on the planet, and Shuri and the other heroes attempt to fight and stop him. They succeed when T'Challa uses Doom's own mystical ploys against him, rendering all processed vibranium on the planet inert.

Following the war with Doom, T'Challa relocates to Hell's Kitchen so that he can better test his capabilities and re-learn what he is capable of without his usual resources, replacing Daredevil while Matt Murdock is going through a similar period of self-analysis after his time possessed as a demon and the leader of the Hand. While T'Challa intended to handle business in Hell's Kitchen on his own, he learns that New York's crime boss Wilson Fisk (Kingpin) is attempting to purchase a controlling interest in the international Bank of Wakanda, with the goal of forcing the Bank to foreclose its current debts by selling its remaining land rights so that they can be exploited for more conventional mineral wealth. While T'Challa mounts a series of attacks against Fisk's new forces with the aid of Sam Wilson and Luke Cage, Shuri infiltrates Fisk's organisation by replacing his right-hand-woman, Miyu, giving her full access to Fisk's financial databases. Shuri plants a worm in the database that exposes most of Fisk's illegal financial transactions, with a final backdoor worm that could expose and ruin what little resources Fisk has left if he ever tries to come after Wakanda again (not wanting to completely take away his money as the heroes know from experience that Fisk will come back but this way he is more focused on protecting what he has left rather than plans for revenge).

With Wakanda struggling economically as seen in the "Klaws of the Panther" storyline, Shuri travels to the Savage Land to meet with Ka-Zar and obtain a stock of natural vibranium present there. They are attacked by Klaw, who wants the vibranium for his own use. They defeat him, but a volcanic eruption caused by his sound waves covers the vibranium and renders it unobtainable. She tracks down other stockpiles in Madripoor and New York, but Klaw already has A.I.M. troops excavating both sites and fights ensue. Klaw had created a monster called M.U.S.I.C. using the vibranium, and intended to place it on an A.I.M. space station to enslave the world. With help from various other heroes, including Wolverine, Spider-Man and Black Widow, Shuri is able to thwart his scheme.

Following Namor's attack on Wakanda during Avengers vs. X-Men, Shuri declares war on Atlantis, despite her brother's protests. The Wakandans virtually level Atlantis, leaving only a few Atlantean survivors. In retaliation for Shuri's assault on Atlantis, Namor lies to Thanos’ agents by falsely telling them that the Infinity Gems were located in Wakanda. After Wakandan troops were forced to retreat from a counterattack by Thanos' army, Shuri learns from the Dora Milaje that T'Challa was in contact with Namor during the Wakandan/Atlantean conflict and that he allowed Namor into the Necropolis several times during the conflict. As a result, Shuri banishes T'Challa from Wakanda's capital city.

During the 2013 "Infinity" storyline, it is shown that Shuri is the head of the Wakandan School for Alternative Studies.

When Wakanda is attacked by the Cabal during the "Time Runs Out" storyline, Shuri sacrifices herself by staying behind to hold off Proxima Midnight so T'Challa can escape. Her death is later confirmed when her spirit is seen among those of the past Black Panthers.

As part of Marvel's 2015 branding All-New, All-Different Marvel, T'Challa is shown trying to revive Shuri's body. Shuri's soul had transcended to the Djalia, a spiritual plane consisting of the entire memories of Wakanda. There, Shuri trained under the tutelage of a griot spirit who had taken the form of her mother, Ramonda. As they trained the griot spirit shared the memories of not only Wakanda but also before the nation had formed. With the help of Manifold, T'Challa combines his technology and Manifold's bending of reality to bring Shuri's soul back to the physical plane. After her revival, Shuri is imbued with the power similar to that of the griot spirit. She had then been informed of the events taking place in her absence, including the rogue Dora Milaje and the rebellion led by Tetu and Zenzi. Shuri sets out to confront the rogue Dora Milaje and convince them to join forces with T'Challa to stop the rebellion and the march against the Golden City, which she was successful in doing. With the united power of Shuri, T'Challa, Manifold, the Dora Milaje and the forces of Wakanda, Tetu is defeated, though Zenzi escapes. As the rebellion ends, Shuri joins Wakanda's council, which had been established by T'Challa.

== Powers and abilities ==
Shuri is a skilled scientist, engineer, and inventor with a genius level of intellect on par with the likes of her brother T'Challa and Tony Stark. Before undergoing the trials to become the Black Panther, Shuri was an extensively trained martial artist. After the trials, like the Black Panthers before her, Shuri consumed the heart-shaped herb; this granted her enhanced speed, agility, strength, endurance and senses. Her uniform is composed of vibranium.

Through her training underneath the tutelage of a griot spirit while in the Djalia, Shuri had been imbued with new supernatural abilities that allowed her to transform her body into a flexible stone-like material which also granted her an enhanced durability that cannot be dented by normal gunfire or powerful directed energy weapons. Shuri is also capable of animorphism which allows her to transform herself and whoever she is in direct contact with into a flock of black birds, or a singular large dark bird.

Shuri's training in the Djalia also imbued her with super-speed, and the ability to temporarily reanimate Wakandan corpses. Reanimating Wakandan corpses takes a lot of energy from her, meaning she can do it for only a short period of time.

== Reception ==
=== Critical response ===
Deirdre Kaye of Scary Mommy called Shuri a "role model" and a "truly heroic" female character. Jo-Anne Rowney of Daily Mirror ranked Shuri 9th in their "Best Female Superheroes of All Time" list. The A.V. Club ranked Shuri 34th in their "100 Best Marvel Characters" list. Lance Cartelli of ComicBook.com ranked Shuri 39th in their "50 Most Important Superheroes Ever" list.

Screen Rant included Shuri in their "15 Most Powerful Kings And Queens In The Marvel Universe" list, in their "15 Most Powerful Variants Of Black Panther In Marvel Comics" list, and in their "15 Smartest Characters In Marvel Comics" list. Comic Book Resources ranked Shuri 6th in their "Marvel: 10 Smartest Female Characters" list, 8th in their "10 Smartest Heroes In The Marvel Universe" list, and 23rd in their "25 Smartest Characters In The Marvel Universe" list.

=== Impact ===
In 2022, Shuri / Black Panther starred as the titular character in the film Black Panther: Wakanda Forever, portrayed by Letitia Wright. It became the sixth-highest-grossing film of 2022, and the second highest-grossing female-led superhero film of all time.

== Literary reception ==
=== Volumes ===
==== Shuri - 2018 ====
According to Diamond Comic Distributors, Shuri #1 was the 65th best selling comic book in October 2018. Shuri #2 was the 96th best selling comic book in November 2018.

Chase Magnett of ComicBook.com gave Shuri #1 a grade of 4 out of 5, writing, "What Okorafor and the rest of the creative team have in store for Shuri and her revised role in Wakanda remains largely impossible to guess. A new government, supernatural changes, and her love of invention are all evoked in Shuri #1 as a presentation of a complex and questioned identity. The title of Black Panther looms large over the young heroine, but this issue makes the case for a story that can both remain part of that legacy without playing second fiddle to King T'Challa. Wherever it goes in its quest to define a rising star, the skill and strength of this team is enough to make it worth discovering issue by issue as Shuri continues." Jesse Schedeen of IGN gave Shuri #1 a grade of 7.5 out of 10, saying, "Shuri #1 provides a welcome solo spotlight for a character who's really exploded in popularity this year. It reads as a natural extension of the core Black Panther comic, one that manages to advance those story threads even as it tries to reflect those elements fans love about the MCU Shuri. It's also a clean, attractively rendered book, even if the script can be needlessly wordy at times."

== Other versions ==
=== Marvel Mangaverse ===
An alternate version of Shuri from Earth-2301 appears in the Marvel Mangaverse. This version is an apprentice of Doctor Doom and is also known as T'Channa.

=== Ultimate Universe ===
An alternate universe version of Shuri from Earth-6160 appears in the Ultimate Universe imprint.

== In other media ==
=== Television ===
- Shuri appears in Black Panther, voiced by Kerry Washington.
- Shuri appears in Avengers Assemble, voiced by Kimberly Brooks in the episode "The Eye of Agamotto" and subsequently by Daisy Lightfoot.
- Shuri appears in Marvel Super Hero Adventures, voiced by Sia Foryoh.
- Shuri appears in Lego Marvel Super Heroes: Black Panther – Trouble in Wakanda, voiced again by Daisy Lightfoot.
- Shuri appears in Marvel Rising: Operation Shuri, voiced again by Daisy Lightfoot.

=== Marvel Cinematic Universe ===
Letitia Wright portrays Shuri in media set in the Marvel Cinematic Universe (MCU). This version is a technological genius and prodigy who designs outfits and weapons for T'Challa / Black Panther. Additionally, she and her brother live in Wakanda's capital with their mother Ramonda. Following T'Challa's death, Shuri assumes the mantle of Black Panther and eventually makes it a separate position while forfeiting her claim to the throne to allow M'Baku to make his own claim. Furthermore, Ozioma Akagha voices alternate universe variants of Shuri in the animated series What If...?.

=== Video games ===
- Shuri appears as a costume for Black Panther in Marvel Heroes.
- Shuri appears as a playable character in Lego Marvel's Avengers as part of the "Black Panther" DLC pack.
- Shuri appears as a playable character in Marvel Avengers Academy, voiced by Mya Rose Puryear.
- Shuri appears as a playable character in Lego Marvel Super Heroes 2, voiced by Susan Wokoma.
- Shuri appears as a playable character in Marvel: Future Fight.
- Shuri appears as a playable character in Marvel Puzzle Quest.
- Shuri / Black Panther appears as a playable character in Marvel Realm of Champions.
- Shuri appears as a non-playable character in Marvel's Avengers, voiced by Erica Luttrell.
- Shuri appears as a playable character in Fortnite Battle Royale.
- Shuri appears as a non-playable character in Marvel Rivals, voiced by Jentel Hawkins.
- Shuri appears in Marvel Cosmic Invasion, voiced by Alison Sealy-Smith.
- Shuri, as a Black Panther appears as a playable character in Marvel Tōkon: Fighting Souls, voiced by Erica Luttrell in English and Mitsuho Kambe in Japanese. She is a member of the Fighting Avengers, led by Captain America (Steve Rogers), alongside their teammates Iron Man and the Hulk.

=== Novels ===
- Nic Stone. Shuri: A Black Panther Novel (2020) ISBN 9781338585476
- Nic Stone. Shuri: The Vanished (2021) ISBN 9780702302831
- Nic Stone. Shuri: Symbiosis (2022) ISBN 9781338794137

== Collected editions ==
Title	Material collected	Date Published	ISBN
Black Panther: The Deadliest of the Species	Black Panther (vol. 5) #1–6	October 2009	978-0785133421
Black Panther: Power	Black Panther (vol. 5) #7–12	March 2010	978-0785138617
Klaws of the Panther	Klaws of the Panther #1–4	March 2011	978-0785151180
Black Panther: Doomwar	Black Panther (vol. 5) #7–12, Doomwar #1–6, Klaws of the Panther #1–4 and material from Age of Heroes #4	February 2017	978-1302904166
Shuri Vol. 1: The Search For Black Panther	Shuri #1-5	May 2019	978-1302915230
Black Panther: The Saga of Shuri & T'Challa	Black Panther (vol. 4) #2, Black Panther (vol. 5) #1-6, Klaws of the Panther #1-4, Black Panther (vol. 6) #8-11	August 2022	978-1302946005
Shuri Vol. 2: 24/7 Vibranium	Shuri #6-10	September 2019	978-1302918545
Shuri: Wakanda Forever	Shuri #1-10	December 2020	978-1302923693
Marvel-Verse: Shuri	Shuri #1, #6-7, Marvel Action: Black Panther #5-6, Marvel's Voices #1	October 2022	978-1518268212
