= Vibranium =

Fictional metal appearing in Marvel Comics

Publication information
- Publisher: Marvel Comics
- First appearance: Daredevil #13 (February 1966)
- Created by: Stan Lee; John Romita Sr.

In story information
- Type: Metal
- Element of stories featuring: Black Panther; Captain America

Vibranium (/vaɪˈbreɪniəm/) is a fictional metal appearing in American comic books published by Marvel Comics, noted for its extraordinary abilities to absorb, store, and release large amounts of kinetic energy. Mined only in the kingdom of Wakanda, the metal is associated with the character Black Panther, who wears a suit of vibranium, and Captain America, who bears a vibranium/steel alloy shield. An alternate form of the material, known as Antarctic Vibranium, or Anti-Metal, has appeared in the Savage Land.

== Publication history ==
Vibranium first appeared in Daredevil #13 (February 1966), which was written by Stan Lee and layouts by Jack Kirby with finished art by John Romita. Here, vibranium was seen to be an unusual metallic element with decidedly strange properties. Since that point in Marvel Comics continuity, it has been established that there are a few variations of this element that can be found in isolated regions all around the world. The variation first introduced in Daredevil #13 eventually became known as Anti-Metal. This variation is different in that it can cut through any known metal. In the Marvel Universe, Anti-Metal can traditionally be found only in Antarctica. Later in Fantastic Four #53 (August 1966), by Stan Lee and Jack Kirby, a new variation of vibranium was introduced in the isolated nation of Wakanda. This variation had the unique attribute of being able to absorb sound. This is the variation that is most often identified in continuity as simply "vibranium".

== Fictional history ==
In the Marvel Universe, vibranium was first deposited on Earth by a meteorite 10,000 years ago. It was discovered during an expedition to Antarctica and named "Anti-Metal" due to its property of dissolving other metals.

A different variety of vibranium found in Wakanda absorbs sound waves and other vibrations, including kinetic energy. Absorbing sound waves, vibrations, and kinetic energy makes this metal stronger. To protect this resource, Wakandans concealed their country from the outside world. Wakandan king T'Chaka funded his country's education by occasionally selling off minuscule quantities of the metal. As a result, Wakanda is one of the world's most technologically advanced nations.

In the early 1940s, a small amount of Wakandan vibranium came into the possession of the scientist Myron MacLain. He tried to combine vibranium with iron to create armor, but was unable to fuse the elements. One morning, MacLain found that the two materials had bonded on their own in an unknown manner. The ultra-resilient alloy was used to create Captain America's shield. MacLain worked for decades without success to duplicate the accident, creating adamantium in the process.

When T'Challa became the king of Wakanda, he strove to end his country's isolation from the rest of the world. Making the existence of vibranium known to the outside world around the mid-1980s, he sold small quantities of it to foreigners who, he believed, would not use it to harmful ends. T'Challa used the profits to enrich and modernize his nation.

== Properties and known abilities ==
=== Wakandan variety ===
The Wakandan isotope possesses the ability to absorb all vibrations in the vicinity as well as kinetic energy directed at it. Wakandan vibranium is also a powerful mutagen. Its radiation permeates much of Wakanda's flora and fauna, including the Heart-Shaped Herb eaten by members of the Black Panther Tribe and the flesh of the white gorilla eaten by the members of the White Gorilla Tribe. Both give superhuman abilities to whoever eats them.

=== Antarctic variety ===
Better known as Anti-Metal, this isotope is native to the Savage Land. The variation produces vibrations of a specific wavelength that break down molecular bonds in metals, causing them to liquefy. It was first discovered by explorer Robert Plunder, the father of Kevin and Parnival Plunder. Wakandan vibranium can be transformed into Antarctic vibranium through exposure to certain kinds of radiation.

Much like Wakandan vibranium, Antarctic vibranium can cause mutations. One person who donned an Anti-Metal suit for protection against Moon Knight began emitting the same radiation he had intended to weaponize.

=== Artificial variety ===
There are at least two forms of man-made vibranium created outside of Wakanda through various means. The first variant is called NuForm, which was created by the Roxxon Corporation. NuForm was created by combining organic and chemical elements and possesses the properties of Wakandan vibranium. However, it degrades into Antarctic vibranium unless it is tempered with microwave radiation.

The second is Reverbium, a dangerous artificial brand created at Horizon Labs by Sajani Jaffrey. Unlike standard vibranium, it rapidly amplifies sound energy before exploding. Max Modell, head of Horizon Labs, ordered its immediate dissolution given how dangerous it was, but Jaffrey held on to some of it without her team's knowledge.

=== Living variety ===
Wakandan scientist Obinna Nwabueze discovered a new form of vibranium in the Echo Chamber, a cave used for training by the Dora Milaje. This variety of Vibranium possesses limited sentience and can attune itself to the environment to cause a variety of effects. For instance, living vibranium can cause disruptive geological phenomena like earthquakes and sending local wildlife into a frenzy. Living vibranium is incredibly volatile and could cause mass destruction if not properly handled.

== In other media ==
=== Marvel Cinematic Universe ===
Vibranium (also known as Isipho) appears in live-action films set in the Marvel Cinematic Universe. First appearing and named on-screen in Captain America: The First Avenger, Howard Stark states the element is stronger than steel, weighs one third as much, and is completely Vibration-absorbent. Having acquired enough to make a shield, Steve Rogers uses it when he becomes Captain America.

=== Television ===
- Vibranium appears in the Spider-Man and His Amazing Friends episode "The X-Men Adventure".
- Vibranium appears in Iron Man: Armored Adventures. This version is a dark grey metal that emits green electricity.
- Vibranium appears in The Avengers: Earth's Mightiest Heroes.
- Vibranium appears in Black Panther (2010).
- Vibranium appears in Marvel Future Avengers. The element is a critical component of the "Emerald Rain Project", a scheme by Kang the Conqueror and the Masters of Evil to reverse-engineer Terrigen Crystals and create controllable superhumans. Due to overmining of the mineral in his future, Kang is forced to travel back to the 21st century to obtain vibranium samples necessary for the project's completion.

=== Film ===
- Vibranium appears in the Marvel Animated Features series of films.
  - In Ultimate Avengers, the Chitauri use Vibranium in their spacecraft hulls and personal armor. S.H.I.E.L.D. later salvages one of their ships and use it as component of Captain America's shield as well as use it in other items such as bullets and knives. They also determined that only nuclear blasts and Vibranium itself is capable of penetrating Vibranium. The organization also developed the satellite Shield 1 to locate Vibranium anywhere on Earth and locate the Chitauri, though the aliens destroyed it.
  - In Ultimate Avengers 2: Rise of the Panther, the Chitauri invade Wakanda for their subterranean supply of Vibranium. In this film, the element is portrayed as a substantial power source, as the Chitauri utilize condensed Vibranium cubes to power their spaceships. It is also the principal component of many Wakandan weapons and can be weakened by gamma radiation as well as gamma-powered individuals such as the Hulk.

=== Video games ===
Vibranium appears in Marvel: Ultimate Alliance 2. A nanite-based artificial intelligence known as "the Fold" attempts to harvest vibranium in Wakanda to construct communication towers around the world, spreading its control signal globally. While the heroes manage to thwart the invasion, they are unable to prevent the Fold from constructing enough towers to make it a global threat.

=== Music ===
Vibranium is referenced in the 2019 single "Take Me Back to London" by Ed Sheeran (featuring Stormzy).

It is also referenced in the bridge of the 2020 track "Love Is a War" by Jeremy Renner.

== Real-world material ==
In 2016, Hyperloop Transportation Technologies developed a real-world smart composite material that they named Vibranium. The lightweight carbon fiber material for the Hyperloop pods is reported to provide the passengers double protection against damage to the exterior. The company says that its Vibranium is 8 times lighter than aluminum and 10 times stronger than steel alternatives. The smart material can transmit critical information regarding temperature, stability, integrity and more, wirelessly and virtually instantly.

Journalists have drawn parallels between Wakanda's vibranium reserves and the mining of coltan in the Democratic Republic of the Congo. Coltan is an ore containing niobium and tantalum, two rare and valuable metals, and its exploitation is linked with child-labor, systematic exploitation of the population by governments or militant groups, exposure to toxic chemicals and other hazards; see coltan mining and ethics. Historian Thomas F. McDow draws a parallel to uranium, found in the mine Shinkolobwe in Haut-Katanga Province, also in the Democratic Republic of Congo.

== Scholarly analysis ==
The concept of vibranium as an extremely valuable material, monopolized and mastered by the African civilization of Wakanda, has been subject to scholarly analysis. Several studies have looked at it from the perspective of cultural studies and literary criticism, including tying it to the genre of afrofuturism. Alessio Gerola noted in the context of the 2018 film Black Panther, that "Fundamental disagreements about vibranium’s existence and use drive the film's plot, but the mythology and history of vibranium are even more essential to understanding how and why characters like Klaw, Killmonger, T'Challa, and Shuri treat vibranium the way they do", concluding that "Vibranium, from a narrative point of view, simply represents the power of possibilities and the disagreements that arise about the “great responsibilities” that follow from such "great powers".

It has been also analyzed with regards to its physical properties as a type of supermaterial. In 2017, Mark Whiting concluded that vibranium, as described in fiction, is not unrealistic, and resembles "a high-entropy shape-memory alloy composite, reinforced with a ceramic", beyond the ability of our current material science to produce, but not beyond the ability of our current theoretical science to explain. It has been suggested that the popular culture impact of vibranium can make it useful as a teaching-aid when attempting to interest students in material science and related fields.

== See also ==
- Neutronium
- Unobtainium
