= Zenzi (comics) =

Publication information
- Publisher: Marvel Comics
- First appearance: Black Panther Vol. 6 #1 (April 2016)
- Created by: Ta-Nehisi Coates; Brian Stelfreeze

In-story information
- Team affiliations: Hydra
- Notable aliases: Revealer
- Abilities: Empathy

Zenzi is a character appearing in American comic books published by Marvel Comics. Created by Ta-Nehisi Coates and Brian Stelfreeze, the character first appeared in Black Panther #1 (April 2016). She is an adversary of the superhero Black Panther.

== Publication history ==
Zenzi was created by writer Ta-Nehisi Coates and artist Brian Stelfreeze, and first appeared in Black Panther #1 (April 2016).

== Fictional character biography ==
Zenzi came from the African country of Niganda, but fled after Killmonger experimented on her and several inhabitants against their will.

She led the army of her home country and allied with Tetu. The Black Panther tried to stop Zenzi at some point, rendering her comatose for some time. Nonetheless, Tetu helped Zenzi escape.

She later allied herself with Baron Zemo and Hydra.

== Powers and abilities ==
Zenzi has the ability to sense and manipulate the emotions of others. She can suppress the limits of the human body, giving superhuman physical abilities to those she controls.

== Reception ==
- In 2020, Comic Book Resources (CBR) ranked Zenzi 7th in their "Marvel: Ranking Black Panther's Rogues Gallery" list.
- In 2022, Screen Rant included Zenzi in their "15 Best Black Panther Comics Characters Not In The MCU" list.
- In 2022, CBR ranked Zenzi 8th in their "10 Most Iconic Black Panther Villains" list.
