= Tetu (comics) =

Publication information
- Publisher: Marvel Comics
- First appearance: Black Panther Vol. 6 #1 (April 2016)
- Created by: Ta-Nehisi Coates; Brian Stelfreeze

In-story information
- Species: Human
- Team affiliations: Hydra
- Abilities: Nature manipulation; Teleportation

Tetu is a character appearing in American comic books published by Marvel Comics. Created by writer Ta-Nehisi Coates and artist Brian Stelfreeze, the character first appeared in Black Panther vol. 6 #1 (April 2016). Tetu, initially motivated by a desire to punish the wealthy elite who exploited the less fortunate, formed the rebellious Wakandan group known as the People and attempted to overthrow the king of Wakanda, Black Panther. Despite this defeat, has returned numerous times, continuously gathering new allies to challenge T'Challa once again. His increasing reliance on violence led him to forge increasingly dangerous alliances, drawing in organizations like Hydra, with figures such as Baron Zemo among his collaborators.

== Development ==
=== Concept and creation ===
Marvel's Donnie Lederer described Tetu as a character who has distorted his mentor's teachings into a philosophy that spreads fear and hatred among the Wakandan people. While Tetu believes he is liberating Wakanda, his actions ultimately show that he is merely replacing one "tyrant" with another.

=== Publication history ===
Tetu debuted in Black Panther vol. 6 #1 (April 2016), created by Ta-Nehisi Coates and Brian Stelfreeze.

== Fictional character biography ==
Tetu is a former student of the Wakandan school Hekima Shulē who left to seek higher knowledge, becoming a shaman, ally of Zenzi, and co-leader of the rebel group known as the People. They later attempt to overthrow T'Challa as king of Wakanda before being defeated, but soon escape and form an alliance with Hydra.

== Reception ==
Marcos Melendez of SlashFilm described as a complex character with noble but flawed motivations, aiming to improve Wakanda and fight for the oppressed, despite his unjust methods. Melendez found Tetu would make a worthy adversary in a future Black Panther 3, bringing a morally nuanced conflict centered on rebellion and social justice.

== Powers and abilities ==
Tetu is a magician with the ability to manipulate nature and create portals across time and space. He possesses control over various elements, including plants, earth, and electricity.
