= Black Panther (TV series) =

- Genre: Action; Adventure; Science fiction Superhero
- Based on: Black Panther by: Stan Lee; Jack Kirby
- Developed by: Reginald Hudlin
- Written by: Reginald Hudlin
- Directed by: Mark Brooks; Jon Schnepp
- Voices of: Djimon Hounsou; Stan Lee; Kerry Washington; Alfre Woodard; David Busch; Stephen Stanton; Jill Scott
- Theme music composer: Stephen James Taylor
- Country of origin: United States
- Original language: English
- No. of seasons: 1
- No. of episodes: 6

Production
- Executive producers: Reginald Hudlin; Eric S. Rollman; Aaron Parry; Sidney Clifton
- Producer: Cort Lane
- Running time: 20 minutes
- Production companies: Marvel Knights Animation; Hudlin Entertainment; Titmouse, Inc. BET

Original release
- Network: BET
- Release: January 16 – January 30, 2010

Black Panther is an American motion comic and television series by Marvel Knights Animation, based on the Marvel Comics superhero of the same name. It was the first animated television series produced by BET since Hey Monie!. Each of the six episodes of the series was 20 minutes in length.

== Plot ==
Upon becoming the new Black Panther after the assassination of his father T'Chaka, T'Challa deals with the jealousy in the Wakandan royal court while looking for the man who killed his father. Unbeknownst to Black Panther, Ulysses Klaue (the man who assassinated T'Chaka) has assembled a group of villains consisting of Batroc the Leaper, Juggernaut, the Vatican Black Knight, and the Russian Radioactive Man to help him take over Wakanda.

== Cast ==
- Djimon Hounsou as T'Challa / Black Panther
- Stan Lee as General Wallace
- Kerry Washington as Princess Shuri
- Alfre Woodard as Dondi Reese, Queen Mother, Dora Milaje
- Carl Lumbly as Uncle S'Yan
- Jill Scott as Storm
- Stephen Stanton as Ulysses Klaue

=== Additional voices ===
- Jonathan Adams as T'Chaka
- JB Blanc as Black Knight, Male Cannibal, Batroc the Leaper
- David Busch as Everett K. Ross
- Taye Diggs as T'Chanda (credited as "Historical Black Panther #2")
- Phil LaMarr as T'Shan
- Peter Lurie as Juggernaut
- Phil Morris as W'Kabi
- Vanessa Marshall as Dora Milaje, Female Cannibal
- Nolan North as Cyclops, Nightcrawler
- Adrian Pasdar as Captain America
- Kevin Michael Richardson as Wolverine, Historical Black Panther #1
- Rick D. Wasserman as Radioactive Man

== Production ==
At a presentation held in New York City in April 2008, BET announced that it had signed a deal with Marvel Comics to turn Black Panther into a primetime half-hour animated series. In July 2008 at San Diego Comic-Con, the first footage of the series was shown publicly, indicating that the series was essentially just motion comic versions of the mini-series released by Marvel Comics.

The show was supervised by Reginald Hudlin (President of Entertainment at BET), Eric S. Rollman (President of Marvel Animation) and John Romita, Jr., writer and artist, respectively, of the story arc of the Black Panther comic entitled "Who is the Black Panther?", on which the first six episodes were based. Only subtle deviations from the comic exist, such as replacing Rhino with Juggernaut.

Djimon Hounsou was cast to voice T'Challa/Black Panther. The series was directed by Mark Brooks and Jon Schnepp. Jon Schnepp co-directed and edited episodes 4 & 5 of the 6 episode animated motion comic series. The theme song was composed by Stephen James Taylor in a dialect meant to be Wakandan (the fictional character's native language). In reality, the song employed a Bantu-based language of Taylor's creation.

== Release ==
The series was broadcast on the Australian children's channel ABC Me (formerly ABC3) in January 2010, and in the United States on BET in November 2011.

In Australia, Magna Pacific released the series in region 4. It was released on DVD and Blu-ray on December 1, 2010. In United States, on January 25, 2011, the series was released to Region 1 DVD. It was part of the Marvel Knights Animation line, the line reserved for Marvel's motion comics. On March 16, 2018, the entire series was released through Marvel's YouTube channel for free as Marvel Knights Animation - Black Panther.

== Episodes ==
No.	Title	Australia air date	U.S. air date
1	"Pilot"	January 16, 2010	November 15, 2011
In the 5th Century A.D. in Wakanda, an enemy tribe was repelled by the Black Panther of that time. The only survivor of the attack is told by the unseen Black Panther "Tell your tribe, tell everyone" as the survivor runs off. In a top-secret Washington meeting, Intelligence Agent Everett Ross briefs the government on the history of the Black Panther. One particular Black Panther in the 1940s tested his might against Captain America when Nazis were operating in Africa. Meanwhile on the other side of the world, Prince T'Challa wins an annual Wakanda tournament, and becomes the Black Panther. At the same time, a disastrous man/machine hybrid is built.
2	"Black Panther"	January 16, 2010	November 15, 2011
Having been crowned the new Black Panther, T'Challa must contend with jealousy in the royal court while searching for the man who murdered his father. Unknown to him, a deadly assassin named Klaw is assembling a team of super-villains to attack Wakanda.
3	"Revenge of the Evil"	January 23, 2010	November 22, 2011
A young T'Challa travels to Egypt and encounters Storm of the X-Men. While preparing to attack Wakanda, Klaw recalls how he assassinated T'Chaka.
4	"Death of Father"	January 23, 2010	November 22, 2011
Juggernaut and the Vatican Black Knight spearhead the attack on Wakanda, and the Black Panther learns the truth about his father's murder.
5	"Black Panther vs. Juggernaut and Black Knight"	January 30, 2010	November 29, 2011
With Wakanda under siege from Klaw's team of super-villains, the Black Panther confronts the Black Knight in aerial combat. Princess Shuri must defend herself against the deadly Radioactive Man.
6	"To the End"	January 30, 2010	November 29, 2011
Klaw has taken control of Wakanda and the Black Panther races against time to save his nation from destruction by an invading army of Deathloks.
