= Dora Milaje =

Fictional team of female characters within the Marvel universe

- Dora Milaje in Doomwar #5 (August 2010). Art by Scot Eaton

Publication information
- Publisher: Marvel Comics
- First appearance: Black Panther, vol. 3 #1 (November 1998)
- Created by: Christopher Priest; Mark Texeira

The Dora Milaje are fictional characters appearing in American comic books published by Marvel Comics. They are a team of women who serve as special forces for the fictional African nation of Wakanda. Prominent members include Nakia and Okoye.

Members of the Dora Milaje appear in the Marvel Cinematic Universe films Captain America: Civil War (2016), Black Panther (2018), Avengers: Infinity War (2018), Avengers: Endgame (2019), and Black Panther: Wakanda Forever (2022), and the Disney+ series The Falcon and the Winter Soldier and What If...? (both 2021).

== Publication history ==
The Dora Milaje first appeared in Black Panther, vol. 3 #1 (November 1998), created by writer Christopher Priest and artist Mark Texeira. Priest, however, claimed that credit for their creation really should go to his Marvel Knights editors Jimmy Palmiotti and Joe Quesada, "who thought it would be great if the Panther had female bodyguards." The Dora Milaje share similarities with the Dahomey Amazons (Agoji), the all-female military regiment of the Kingdom of Dahomey, which was located in West Africa in what is now the Republic of Benin.

The 2017 series "World of Wakanda" written by Roxane Gay and Yona Harvey, tells the story of the couple Ayo and Aneka, two former Dora Milaje.

In the 2018 limited series Wakanda Forever, written by Nnedi Okorafor, the Dora Milaje appear in team-ups with Spider-Man, the X-Men and the Avengers.

== Fictional character biography ==
To keep peace in Wakanda, the Black Panther picked dora milaje ("adored ones") from 18 rival tribes to serve as his personal guard and ceremonial wives-in-training.

== Abilities ==
The Dora Milaje are trained in various African martial arts such as ngolo, musangwe and Nguni stick-fighting, as well as muay thai, silat, krav maga and others.

== Members ==
- Ailouros - A former Dora Milaje who was turned into a vampire by the Temple of the Shifting Sun vampire hive and took on the name Apostate.
- Aneka - A former leader of the Dora Milaje. She was arrested and stripped of her rank after killing a chieftain who had been victimizing women in her village. After escaping, she became half of the vigilante duo known as the Midnight Angels.
- Ayo - Aneka's lover and another former Dora Milaje. After Aneka is arrested and sentenced to death, Ayo breaks her out of prison. Using a pair of prototype armored suits, the two became the Midnight Angels.
- M'yra - A member of the Dora Milaje who lost her right arm and was assigned to protect Shuri.
- Nareema - A Dora Milaje member who helped Storm fight the V-Series Doombots.
- Nakia – A Wakandan who possesses superhuman strength, speed, and agility. She is a former Dora Milaje of T'Challa.
- Okoye – A former Dora Milaje. Okoye is of the J'Kuwali tribe and acted as a traditional, proper concomitant to the king, speaking only to him and only in Hausa, an African language not widely spoken in Wakanda, for privacy.
- Queen Divine Justice – The street-smart queen of the Jabari tribe of Wakanda. She is a former member of the Dora Milaje and was raised in Chicago. She originally went by the name Chanté Giovanni Brown, while her Wakandan name is Ce'Athauna Asira Davin.
- Zola - The headmistress of the Dora Milaje who trained Aneka, Ayo, and Nakia.

== In other media ==
=== Television ===
- The Dora Milaje appear in Black Panther, voiced by Alfre Woodard and Vanessa Marshall.
- The Dora Milaje appear in The Avengers: Earth's Mightiest Heroes episode "Welcome to Wakanda", with Okoye, Nakia, and Divine Justice as prominent members.
- The Dora Milaje appear in Avengers Assemble, with Aneka as a prominent member.
- Okoye appears in Lego Marvel Super Heroes - Black Panther: Trouble in Wakanda, voiced by Yvette Nicole Brown.
- The Dora Milaje appear in the X-Men '97 episode "Tolerance is Extinction".

=== Marvel Cinematic Universe ===
The Dora Milaje appear in media set in the Marvel Cinematic Universe.

=== Video games ===
- A member of the Dora Milaje appears in Lego Marvel's Avengers.
- The Dora Milaje appear in Marvel Ultimate Alliance 3: The Black Order.

== Collected editions ==
Title	Material collected	Pages	Date Published	ISBN
World of Wakanda	Black Panther: World of Wakanda #1–6	144	June 27, 2017	978-1302906504
Wakanda Forever	Amazing Spider-Man: Wakanda Forever, X-men: Wakanda Forever, Avengers: Wakanda Forever, Black Panther Annual vol. 2 #1	136	November 6, 2018	978-1302913588
