= T'Chaka =

Marvel Comics character

Publication information
- Publisher: Marvel Comics
- First appearance: Fantastic Four #53 (July 1966)
- Created by: Stan Lee (writer); Jack Kirby (artist)

In-story information
- Species: Human mutate
- Place of origin: Earth
- Notable aliases: Black Panther
- Abilities: Superhuman strength, speed, agility, stamina, durability, reflexes, and senses Expert martial artist

T'Chaka is a superhero appearing in American comic books published by Marvel Comics. He is the father of T'Challa and Shuri. He was the king of Wakanda and Black Panther before T'Challa; he inherited both titles following the death of his father, T'Chanda aka Azzuri the Wise.

John Kani portrayed the character in the Marvel Cinematic Universe films Captain America: Civil War (2016) and Black Panther (2018) while Kani's son Atandwa portrayed a younger version of the character. Kani returned to voice alternate versions of the character in the animated Disney+ series What If...? (2021).

== Publication history ==
T'Chaka first appeared in Fantastic Four #53 (1966) and was created by Stan Lee and Jack Kirby.

== Fictional character biography ==
T'Chaka is the Chieftain of Wakanda who ascended to the throne after the death of his father King T'Chanda, also known as Azzuri. During 1941 at the time of World War II, Captain America traveled to Wakanda, where he met T'Chaka. Together, they assisted Sgt. Fury and His Howling Commandos against Red Skull and Baron Strucker. T'Chaka and Captain America also faced threats from Master Man, Warrior Woman, and Armless Tiger Man when they partook in an all-out attack on Wakanda. Armless Tiger Man even threatened to kill T'Chaka if he did not surrender. Outmanned and outgunned, T'Chaka and Captain America held their own against Master Man, Warrior Woman, Armless Tiger Man, White Gorilla, and Red Skull.

Sometime later, Captain America visited Wakanda and gave T'Chaka his triangle shield in exchange for vibranium. After becoming engaged to his first wife N'Yami, T'Chaka adopted Hunter, who he groomed as the heir to the throne until the day N'Yami gave birth to T'Challa and then died from childbirth. Shortly after T'Challa's birth, his brother Jakarra was born. T'Chaka later married Ramonda, who gave birth to Shuri.

In the fall of 1959, T'Chaka was kidnapped by Geoffrey Sydenham of the organization ICON and brought to Latveria as part of their plan to weaken Wakanda and steal its technology. However, Dum Dum Dugan and Eric Koenig rescued him and safely returned him to Wakanda.

Many years later, Wakanda had their technology coveted as they had no ties to any other countries. Ulysses Klaw and his mercenaries invaded Wakanda and demanded that T'Chaka give them their vibranium. When T'Chaka refused, Klaw's mercenaries killed him. Afterwards, T'Challa's uncle S'Yan ruled Wakanda until T'Challa came of age to become Chieftain Wakanda.

== Powers and abilities ==
Upon eating a special heart-shaped herb, his natural powers are enhanced. T'Chaka possesses superhuman strength, speed, agility, stamina, durability, reflexes, and senses. He is also an expert martial artist, a known weapons expert, a skilled marksman, an expert tracker and hunter, and a master tactician outside of his mutant powers.

=== Weaknesses ===
T'Chaka's heightened senses cause bright lights, loud noises, and strong smells to potentially overwhelm him.

== Other versions ==
=== Ultimate Marvel ===
In the Ultimate Marvel universe, T'Chaka's full name was T'Chaka Udaku. In addition to T'Challa, he was also the father of M'Baku.

=== Ultimate Universe ===
An alternate universe version of T'Chaka from Earth-6160 appears in "Ultimate Invasion". This version was killed by a suicide bomber working for Ra and Khonshu.

== In other media ==
=== Film ===
T'Chaka, based on the Ultimate Marvel incarnation, appears in Ultimate Avengers II, voiced by Dave Fennoy. This version possessed the ability to transform into a humanoid black panther and was killed by a Chitauri disguised as Nazi general Herr Kleiser.

=== Marvel Cinematic Universe ===
T'Chaka appears in media set in the Marvel Cinematic Universe (MCU), portrayed by John Kani as an adult and Atandwa Kani as a young adult.

- T'Chaka first appears in the live-action film Captain America: Civil War, in which he and his son T'Challa attend a United Nations conference to ratify the Sokovia Accords before Helmut Zemo detonates a bomb near the building, which kills T'Chaka.
- T'Chaka appears in the live-action film Black Panther (2018). In flashbacks, he confronted his War Dog brother, N'Jobu for helping Ulysses Klaue steal Vibranium from them and attempting to force Wakanda to take on a more aggressive foreign policy to fight social injustice, which had led to T'Chaka killing N'Jobu in cold blood. Concerned with maintaining Wakanda's security, he subsequently abandoned his nephew, Erik Stevens. Upon learning of what happened and amidst Erik's effort to take over Wakanda in the present, T'Challa confronts T'Chaka and their ancestors in the ancestral plane before vowing to correct their mistakes.
- Alternate timeline variants of T'Chaka appear in the Disney+ animated series What If...?.
  - In "What If... T'Challa Became a Star-Lord?", T'Chaka was first seen in a flashback advising his son T'Challa against exploring the outskirts of Wakanda which led to him getting abducted by the Ravagers by mistake and becoming Star Lord. He would later be reunited with his son when he and the Ravagers come to Wakanda and hears about his exploits throughout the galaxy.
  - In "What If... Killmonger Rescued Tony Stark?", T'Chaka meets his estranged nephew Killmonger after he brings Ulysses Klaue's dead body to him sometime after T'Challa's death.
  - In "What If... Peter Quill Attacked Earth's Mightiest Heroes?", a younger T'Chaka is among the heroes recruited by Howard Stark and Peggy Carter to fight a young Peter Quill and Ego.

=== Television ===
- T'Chaka as the Black Panther makes a non-speaking cameo appearance in the X-Men: The Animated Series episode "Sanctuary".
- T'Chaka appears in the Fantastic Four episode "Panther's Prey", voiced by Beau Weaver.
- T'Chaka appears in a flashback in the Black Panther (2011) episode "Revenge of the Evil", voiced by Jonathan Adams.
- T'Chaka appears in The Avengers: Earth's Mightiest Heroes episode "The Man in the Ant Hill", voiced by Hakeem Kae-Kazim. This version was killed by Man-Ape and Klaw.
- T'Chaka appears in Avengers Assemble, voiced by Keith David as an adult and James C. Mathis III as a child. This version provided Howard Stark with the vibranium used in the creation of Captain America's shield after he helped him fend off a Hydra invasion during World War II, before later dying under unspecified circumstances.
- T'Chaka as the Black Panther appears in the X-Men '97 episode "Tolerance is Extinction - Part 3", voiced by Isaac Robinson-Smith.
