= Mark Texeira =

American painter

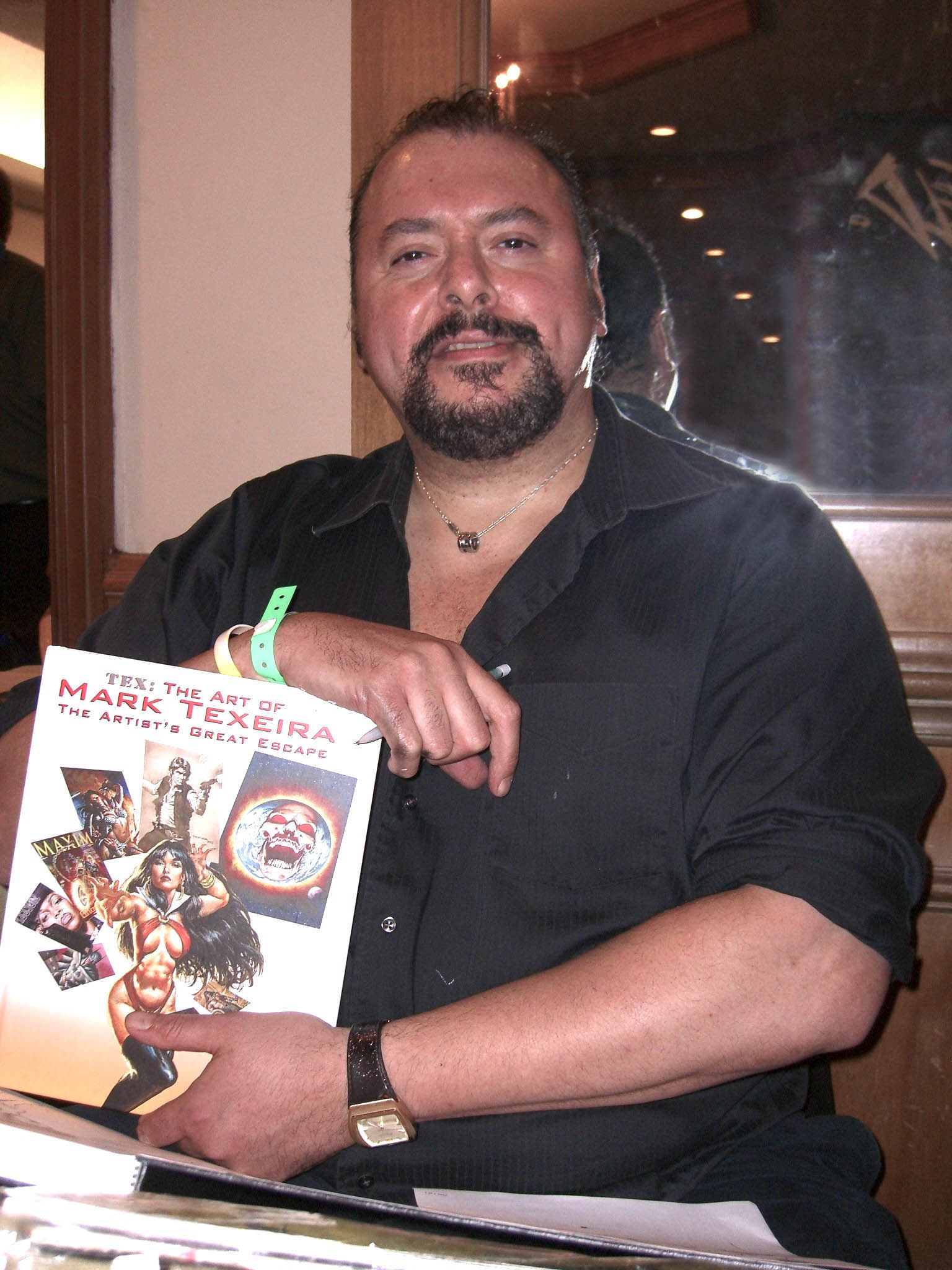
- Texeira at the Big Apple Convention in Manhattan, October 2010
- Born: December 17, 1961 (age 64) New York City, U.S.
- Areas: Penciller, Artist, Inker
- Pseudonym: Tex
- Notable works: Ghost Rider; Wolverine; Sabretooth; Vampirella

Mark Texeira (/təkˈsɛərə/) is an American comic book artist. Classically trained as a painter, he broke into the comics field in the early 1980s.

== Career ==
Mark Texeira was born and raised in New York City. He attended Manhattan's High School of Art and Design, and was granted a Presidential Scholarship at the School of Visual Arts, where he attended for two years before dropping out to pursue a freelance commercial art career. During this period, Texeira took classes at the Art Students League. His oil paintings soon won mentions at the Salmagundi Club and the Society of Illustrators.

Comics titles Texeira has contributed to include Masters Of The Universe (1981), DC Power Lords, Jonah Hex and its spinoff Hex (1985–1986), Psi-Force (1986–1987), The Punisher War Journal (1990), Ghost Rider vol. 3 (1990–1992, 1997–1998), and vol. 5, Wolverine vol. 2 (1993), Sabretooth (1993), Spider-Man: Legacy of Evil (1996), Black Panther vol. 3 (1998), Moon Knight vol. 4 (1999), Vampirella, Cyclops (2001), Hercules vol. 4 (2005) and Wolverine vol. 3 (2005).

== Technique and materials ==
When painting, Texeira begins with a penciled layout on loose paper, and following approval of the layout, will acquire reference photos or hire models to pose for him, in order to "capture the feeling of the sketch as closely as possible." Texeira will then apply a few layers of gesso to a Masonite board, and then carefully lay the drawing out in tight pencil, noting subtleties of skin tone and sharpening the image throughout the process. He will then create the underpainting, in which he applies sepias, or a mix of browns, blacks and whites. Any final changes to the painting, such as aspects of a character's facial expression, are made during this stage. He then carefully and thinly applies acrylic paint to achieve the final colors, lightly so as to not lose the underpainting.

== Bibliography ==
=== DC ===
- Ghosts #108, 111-112 (1982)
- The Warlord #53-57 (1982)
- Hex #1-9, 11-14 (1985–86)
- House of Mystery #308 (1982)
- Jonah Hex #89 (1985)
- Jonah Hex / Yosemite Sam Special (2017)
- Power Lords #1-3 (1983–84)
- Swamp Thing Annual #1 (1982)
- Stormwatch: Team Achilles #7 (2003)

=== Image ===
- Mark Texeira's Pscythe (2004)
- The Darkness: Wanted Dead (2003)
- Tomb Raider: Scarface's Treasure (2003)
- Union #1-4 (1993–94)

=== Marvel ===
- Akira #37 (painted art) (1995)
- Black Panther, vol. 3, #1-4 (1998–99)
- Buckaroo Banzai, miniseries, #1-2 (1984)
- Clive Barker's Hellraiser #8 (1991)
- Cyclops, miniseries, #1-4 (2001–02)
- Ghost Rider, vol. 3, #5, 7, 13-19,22-24 (1990–92)
- Guardians of the Galaxy #23 (1992)
- Hercules, miniseries, #1-5 (2005)
- Hulk #5, Annual 2000 (among other artists) (1999–2000)
- Marvel Comics Presents (Wolverine/Ghost Rider): #65-71 (1990–91)
- Marvel Super Special (Buckaroo Banzai): #33 (1984)
- Moon Knight, miniseries, #1-4 (1999)
- Psi-Force #1-5, 8, Annual #1 (1986–87)
- Punisher #36-37, 42, Annual #1, 3, Summer Special #1 (1990–91)
- Punisher War Journal #25-30, 50 (1990–93)
- Punisher: Red X-Mas (2005)
- Punisher War Zone #37 (1995)
- Sabretooth, miniseries, #1-4 (1993)
- Sectaurs #1-2 (1985)
- Sentry/ X-Men (2001)
- Space: Punisher #1-4 (2012)
- Spider-Man: Legacy of Evil (painted art) (1996)
- Terror Inc. #6 (along with Jorge Zaffino) (1992)
- Thor ("Tales of Asgard") #416 (1990)
- Thor: Heaven & Earth, miniseries, #2 (2011)
- Tomb of Terror (Man-Thing) #1 (2010)

=== Other publishers ===
- Conan and the Daughters of Midora (Dark Horse, 2004)
- Megalith #1-3 (Continuity, 1989–90)
- Vampirella (Pantha feature): #13-17 (Harris, 2002–03)
- Vampirella / Pantha: Faster Pussycat (painted art) (Harris, 1997)
