= Black Panther (character) =

Marvel Comics superhero

T'Challa Black Panther
- Black Panther taken from the cover of Black Panther #7 (January 1978), by Jack Kirby.

Publication information
- Publisher: Marvel Comics
- First appearance: Fantastic Four #52 (July 1966)
- Created by: Stan Lee; Jack Kirby

In-story information
- Full name: T'Challa
- Place of origin: Wakanda
- Team affiliations: Avengers; Fantastic Four; Mighty Avengers; Fantastic Force; New Avengers; Ultimates; The Crew
- Partnerships: Storm; Shuri
- Notable aliases: Black Leopard; Black Panther; Mr. Okonkwo; Panther King
- Abilities: The power to draw upon the knowledge, strength and every experience of every previous Black Panther; Enhanced strength, endurance, speed, agility, reflexes, stamina and senses; Master hand-to-hand combatant and martial artist; Highly proficient tactician, strategist and inventor; Genius-level intellect; Utilizing vibranium suit and equipment

Black Panther is a superhero appearing in American comic books published by Marvel Comics. Created by scripter-editor Stan Lee and plotter-artist Jack Kirby, the character first appeared in Fantastic Four #52 (July 1966). Born T'Challa, son of the previous Black Panther T'Chaka, he is the king and protector of the fictional African nation of Wakanda, a technologically advanced society sustained by deposits of the fictional metal vibranium. Along with enhanced abilities achieved through the Wakandan ritual of drinking the essence of the heart-shaped herb, T'Challa relies on his proficiency in science, expertise in his nation's traditions, rigorous physical training, hand-to-hand combat skills, and access to wealth and advanced Wakandan technology to combat his enemies. The character became a member of the Avengers in 1968, and has continued that affiliation off and on in subsequent decades.

The storylines of the 1970s written by Don McGregor were critically acclaimed and introduced T'Challa's nemesis Erik Killmonger. These stories also engage with significant social issues of the time, such as the resurgence of the Ku Klux Klan in the U.S. state of Georgia. A subsequent story addressed the issue of apartheid in South Africa. In the late 1990s, Christopher Priest re-invented the character and emphasized the importance of Wakanda as an independent and technologically advanced African nation. Priest also introduced the Dora Milaje, Black Panther's female bodyguards. In subsequent series written by Reginald Hudlin, T'Challa married Storm of the X-Men. Hudlin's stories emphasize Black cultural pride and achieved greater commercial success. In Hudlin's era, the role of Black Panther and leadership of Wakanda was also temporarily given to T'Challa's sister Shuri while he was briefly in a coma. While T'Challa and Storm's marriage was annulled in a subsequent storyline, their relationship has continued in other narratives. The Black Panther comics became particularly commercially successful in 2016, partly as a result of the literary fame of their writer, the journalist and essayist Ta-Nehisi Coates. The first issue of his series was the best-selling comic book of that month. Coates's series called into question the legitimacy of monarchy in Wakanda and articulated a more democratic vision.

The Black Panther is the first Black superhero in American mainstream comic books. The character is also an early example of the Afrofuturist aesthetic. He has made numerous appearances in various television shows, animated films, and video games. Chadwick Boseman portrayed T'Challa in Phase Three of the Marvel Cinematic Universe's films: Captain America: Civil War (2016), Black Panther (2018), Avengers: Infinity War (2018), and Avengers: Endgame (2019). Boseman voiced alternate versions of the character in the first season of the animated series What If...? (2021), which was released after his death in 2020. The Black Panther film was a notable critical and popular success. Letitia Wright's character Shuri, who had appeared in previous MCU films, took on the Black Panther mantle in Black Panther: Wakanda Forever (2022), following Boseman's death. David Jonsson is scheduled to portray T'Challa II in Black Panther III (2028).

== Artistic conception ==
=== Creation ===
Black Panther's first appearance in Fantastic Four #52 (July 1966).

The origin of the character has been disputed by both Stan Lee and Jack Kirby, with both claiming the impetus for the idea. However, both of the creators have said they were motivated by general humanistic and inclusive values, rather than any social or political awareness of the civil rights movement. Kirby claimed sole credit for creating the character in The Comics Journal #134 (February 1990), stating that he realized an absence of Black characters in his comics, and believed that they should be added for "human reasons". In this interview, Kirby declared: "I came up with the Black Panther because I realized I had no blacks in my strip. I'd never drawn a black. I needed a black. I suddenly discovered that I had a lot of black readers. My first friend was a black! And here I was ignoring them because I was associating with everybody else." Lee, in contrast, claimed he created the character because, in the mid-1960s, he wanted to include more African and African American characters in Marvel Comics. Lee later recollected: "I suddenly realized that there were no black superheroes, and I felt we ought to have one. There were no black heroes that I knew about, and there were certainly no black heroes who were the king of their own country in Africa. [...] He didn't live in a village with thatched huts--although that's what you saw on the surface. Underneath was that fantastic city that he had created, which was completely scientific and had all the latest equipment of every type in it. And we realize that the Black Panther is one of the world's great scientists--[just like] Reed Richards. So, again, I wanted to go against [stereotypes]." There is no documentation to establish the veracity of either claim to originality. However, Asher Elbein's research indicates that by 1966 Kirby largely plotted Fantastic Four independently, explaining the stories to Lee when the pages arrived in the Marvel offices. In 1963, Lee and Kirby included a black character, Gabe Jones, in the ensemble cast of Sgt. Fury and His Howling Commandos, and Lee encouraged artists to include black characters in crowd scenes. Soon after Black Panther was introduced, Marvel added two more recurring black characters: Jill Jerrold in Modeling with Millie, and Bill Foster in The Avengers.

Co-creator Stan Lee recounted that the name was inspired by a pulp adventure hero who had a black panther as a helper. Jack Kirby's original concept art for Black Panther used the concept name Coal Tiger; this was a swashbuckler. Lee asked for the concept art to be revised.

=== Predecessors ===
The Black Panther is the first Black superhero in American mainstream comic books. Very few Black heroes were created before him, and none with actual superpowers. These included Lothar in the comic strip Mandrake the Magician and the characters in the single-issue All-Negro Comics #1 (1947). Marvel's 1950s predecessor, Atlas Comics also introduced Waku, Prince of the Bantu, who starred in his own feature in the omnibus title Jungle Tales, and the Dell Comics Western character Lobo, the first Black person to star in his own comic book. Scholars have identified precursors to the character: Harry Wills, a champion boxer of the early 20th century nicknamed the Black Panther, and a predominately African-American armored combat unit in World War II also called the Black Panthers, the 761st Tank Battalion of the US Army. Lee and Kirby also borrow from typical pop cultural tropes of their era inspired by Edgar Rice Burroughs's Tarzan, but subvert or transform stereotypes common in the "jungle adventure" genre.

The name Black Panther predates the founding of the Black Panther Party in October 1966, though not the black panther logo of the party's predecessor, the Lowndes County Freedom Organization (LCFO). Scripter Stan Lee denied that the comic, which pre-dates the political usage of the term, was, or could have been, named after any of the political uses of the term "black panther", citing "a strange coincidence".

== Publication history ==
=== Early years: 1960s and early 1970s ===
Black Panther first appeared in Fantastic Four #52, published in July 1966, and the following issue in August of the same year. There was some debate at Marvel, with Lee wondering how far to go with the introduction of a Black superhero, which was commercially risky in that era. In the first version of the cover for Fantastic Four #52, Kirby drew the Black Panther wearing a cowl that exposed his face. In the published version, the cowl became a full facemask. Previews in other comics did not show the cover at all, indicating that Lee was hesitant. Subsequent to his first appearance, Black Panther made guest appearances in Fantastic Four Annual #5 (1967) and with Captain America in Tales of Suspense #97–99 and Captain America 100 (January – April 1968). The Black Panther journeyed from the fictional African nation of Wakanda to New York City to join the titular American superhero team in The Avengers #52 (May 1968). He appeared in that comic for the next few years. During his time with the Avengers, he also made solo guest-appearances in three issues of Daredevil, and fought Doctor Doom in Astonishing Tales #6–7 (June & August 1971), in that supervillain's starring feature. In a guest appearance in Fantastic Four #119 (February 1972), the Black Panther briefly used the name "Black Leopard" to avoid association with the Black Panther Party, but the new name did not last. The character's name was changed back to Black Panther in The Avengers #105, with T'Challa explaining that renaming himself made as much sense as altering the Scarlet Witch's name because of the negative associations of witchcraft, and that he eschews stereotypes. Avengers writer Roy Thomas said that the Black Panther name "had more resonance," but that the political implications limited the character's prominence.

=== 1970s and 1980s ===
He received his first starring feature with Jungle Action #5 (July 1973), a reprint of a story in The Avengers #62 (March 1969) that focused on Black Panther. A new series, titled "Panther's Rage", began running the following issue, written by Don McGregor, with art by pencilers Rich Buckler, Gil Kane, and Billy Graham, and which gave inkers Klaus Janson and Bob McLeod some of their first professional exposure. The critically acclaimed series ran in Jungle Action #6–18 (1973-1975). One now-common format McGregor pioneered was that of the self-contained, multi-issue story arc. "Panther's Rage" also introduces T'Challa's nemesis Erik Killmonger, a rival for the throne of Wakanda who recurs in subsequent series. Rebecca Wanzo, a scholar of African-American literature, describes "Panther's Rage" as "the first major step in decolonizing the character." The cast of the story arc is almost entirely Black. The second and final arc in Jungle Action, also written by McGregor, was titled "Panther vs. the Klan" and ran in 1976. The subject matter of the Ku Klux Klan was considered controversial in the Marvel offices at the time, creating difficulties for the creative team. Scholars Burton P. Buchanan, Ivan Alcime, and Carlos D. Morrison point out that the story was published at a time of resurgence for the Klan in Georgia, and that the story prescribes a self-defense strategy for Black people in response. Qiana J. Whitted points out that the artists in this period incorporated African American popular culture of the era, such as T'Challa wearing a "modified version of the gold-chain outfit worn by singer Isaac Hayes for the Watts, Los Angeles, community benefit concert that was released as the 1973 documentary film Wattstax."

Though popular with college students, the overall sales of Jungle Action were low. Marvel relaunched the Black Panther in a self-titled series, bringing in the character's co-creator Jack Kirby—newly returned to Marvel after having decamped to rival DC Comics for a time—as writer, penciler, and editor. In the series, Black Panther searches for a magic artifact called King Solomon's Frog. However, the series was commercially unsuccessful. Kirby left the series after only 12 issues and was replaced by Ed Hannigan (writer), Jerry Bingham (penciler), and Roger Stern (editor). Black Panther ran 15 issues (January 1977 – May 1979); the contents of what would have been Black Panther #16–18 were published in Marvel Premiere #51–53.

In 1980, Black Panther appeared as a guest star in The Defenders #84-86 (June–August), written by Ed Hannigan. This story introduced Black Panther's rivalry with Namor and his kingdom of Atlantis, which becomes a recurring conflict in future story lines. Later in the year, Black Panther appeared in a back up story in Marvel Team-Up #100 (December) that establishes his relationship with Storm of the X-Men. A four-issue miniseries, Black Panther vol. 2, (July – October 1988) was written by Peter B. Gillis and penciled by Denys Cowan. McGregor revisited his Panther saga with Gene Colan in "Panther's Quest", published as 25 eight-page installments within the bi-weekly anthology series Marvel Comics Presents (issues #13–37, Feb.–December 1989). The story takes place in South Africa. In the view of critic Todd Steven Burroughs, "'Quest' attempts to show how oppressive apartheid is for everyone involved."

=== 1990s ===
McGregor later teamed with artist Dwayne Turner in the square-bound miniseries Black Panther: Panther's Prey (September 1990 – March 1991). While the project received some critical accolades, the character did not appear again for several years.

Writer Christopher Priest's and penciller Mark Texeira's 1998 series Black Panther vol. 3 re-invented the character, initially under the Marvel Knights imprint. Priest was the first Black creator to become an editor at Marvel. Priest believed that the Black Panther had been misused in the years after his initial creation by Lee and Kirby, and that he had developed a reputation as a dull "also-ran" with no evident powers. To reinvent the character, he emphasized Black Panther's role as a monarch of a technologically advanced independent nation, and hence one of the most powerful figures in the Marvel universe. Scholar Todd Steven Burroughs describes the new vision for the Black Panther as "a combination of Frank Miller's Batman and South African president Nelson Mandela." Priest's initial concept was inspired by Batman, but also by one of Batman's nemeses, Ra's al Ghul, the mysterious leader of a League of Assassins. Priest believed this "fearsome African warrior" would simply be too intimidating for the Marvel universe. Priest introduced the character of Everett K. Ross, a State Department attorney, as a device for reader identification: "I realized I could use Ross to bridge the gap between the African culture that the Black Panther mythos is steeped in and the predominantly white readership that Marvel sells to." Influenced by Chris Claremont and Frank Miller, he aimed to introduce moral ambiguity and political complexity to the world of Black Panther. Priest also envisioned the series as a political satire, comparing it to The West Wing. In Priest's characterization, T'Challa actually joined the Avengers in order to spy on them, protecting Wakanda's national interests. Inspired by the Eddie Murphy film Coming to America, Priest and his artists returned to the fundamental sovereignty of Wakanda. He revisited Erik Killmonger and other characters introduced in "Panther's Rage", together with new characters such as State Department attorney Everett Ross and the Dora Milaje, the Panther's female bodyguards. In their original characterization, the Dora Milaje are beautiful teenage girls who are, officially speaking, the Panther's potential wives. Dora Milaje is said to translate from Hausa to "adored ones".

Ta-Nehisi Coates has said that Priest "had the classic run on Black Panther, period, and that's gonna be true for a long time." Cultural critic Douglas Wolk agrees that Christopher Priest's run established the canonical version of the character, although: "The tone of Priest's run was wildly different from any other Black Panther stories before or since—it's basically a political comedy—but Priest's central insight was that T'Challa isn't actually a superhero in the ordinary sense," but rather a monarch. He also says that the first issue of the run makes no sense at first reading, and requires a continuing interpretation of future issues. He argues that this is unique in mainstream superhero comics.

=== 2000s ===
Black Panther #25-27 (December 2000-February 2001) reintroduce Storm as a major character in Black Panther's world. Priest intended their love affair as a consistent aspect of their development, but did not believe they could form a durable relationship. The last 13 issues of Priest's series (#50–62) saw the main character replaced by a multiracial New York City police officer named Kasper Cole, with T'Challa relegated to a supporting character. This Black Panther, who became the White Tiger, was placed in the series The Crew, running concurrently with the final few Black Panther issues. The Crew was canceled with issue #7.

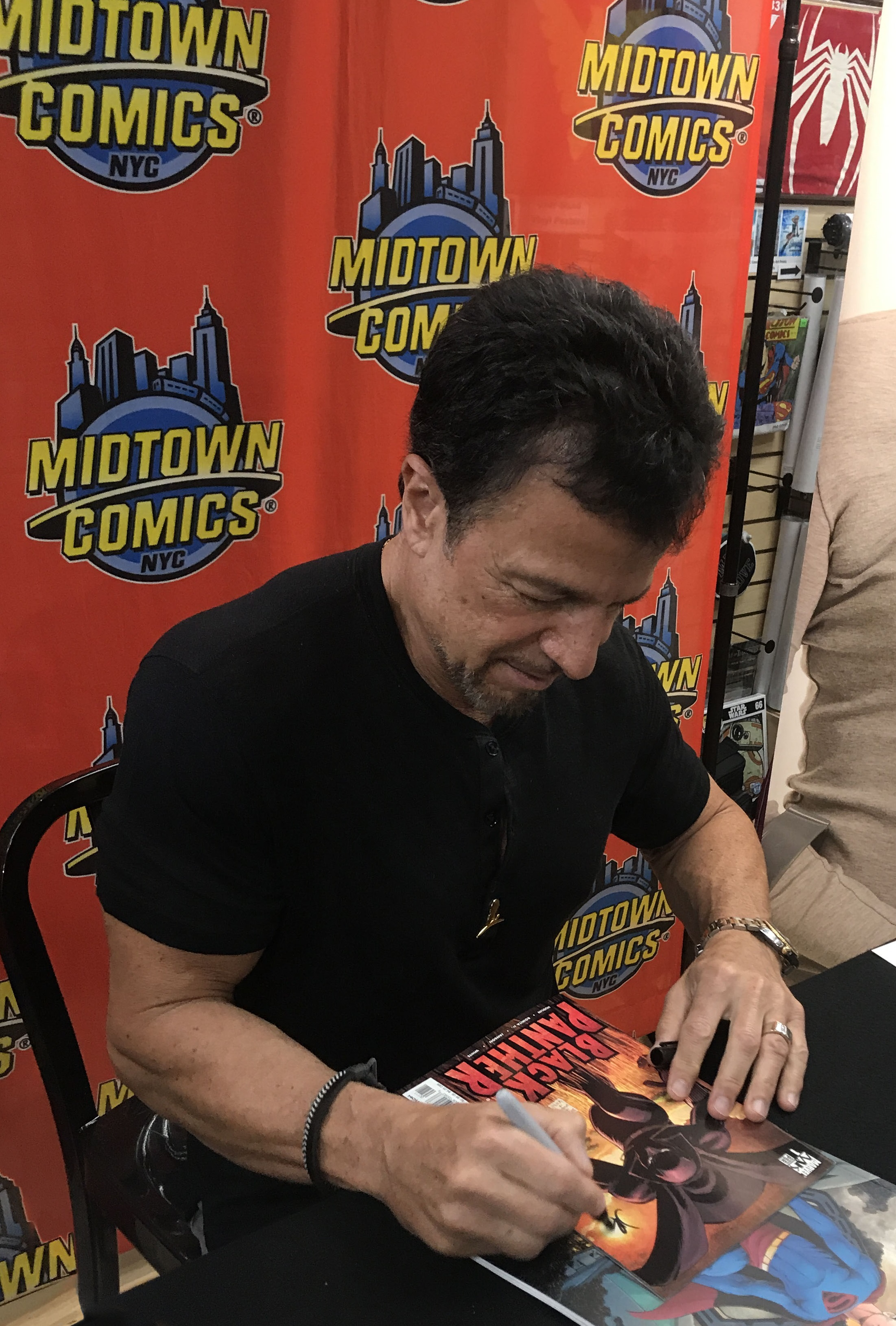
Artist John Romita Jr. signing a copy of the fourth Black Panther series at Midtown Comics in Manhattan

In 2005, Marvel began publishing Black Panther vol. 4, which ran 62 issues. It was initially written by filmmaker Reginald Hudlin (through issue #38) and penciled by John Romita, Jr. (through #6). Hudlin is a Hollywood writer and director who was at that time the president of the entertainment division of Black Entertainment Television. He wanted to add "street cred" to the title, although he noted that the book was not necessarily or primarily geared toward an African-American readership. As influences for his characterization of the character, Hudlin has cited comic character Batman, film director Spike Lee, and music artist Sean Combs. The Black Panther comics that Hudlin wrote sold much better than any previous series featuring the character, including Priest's. According to Diamond Comic Distributors, Black Panther (2005) #1 was the 27th best-selling comic book in February 2005. Hudlin's series also received positive notice from figures outside the comic book world, such as Ice Cube and Ziggy Marley.

In 2006, during Hudlin's run, T'Challa marries Storm of the X-Men, and she appeared as a prominent supporting character in many subsequent storylines. Readers and critics compared the wedding to the relationship of Jay-Z and Beyoncé, although they did not marry until two years later. This wedding takes place during Marvel's Civil War event, and presented a temporary truce in the conflict of that storyline. Subsequently, as a result of the conflict among superheroes during this era, the two characters replace Mister Fantastic and the Invisible Woman in the Fantastic Four. Douglas Wolk observes that the wedding is the most well-known moment in Hudlin's run, and contends that the "mutual admiration leading to matrimony seemed to come out of nowhere," that neither have much in common "besides being superheroes with somewhat formal speech patterns and connections to Africa and divinity," and that while "one is a champion of a cross-sectional group, the other is a monarch of a physical nation." Hudlin responded to such criticisms in a 2010 interview, declaring that the wedding was set up for months by two different storylines and that the two characters are perfectly matched.

In Hudlin's series, the Dora Milaje are a clearly military organization, with shaven heads, rather than the attractive teenage girls previously established by Priest. In addition, Hudlin established T'Challa's complex friendship with Luke Cage, another prominent Black superhero created several years after Black Panther. While T'Challa is from an African nation that was never colonized, Cage is a street-level New York superhero of a vastly different culture. Hudlin explores these differences in the interactions between the two heroes. Like Priest, Hudlin emphasizes Black Panther's power and independence; as he puts it, T'Challa is "an INTERNATIONAL player who's equally at home at the Davos Conference in Switzerland, meeting with Colin Powell in D.C., kicking it in Harlem with Bill Clinton and Al Sharpton, and brokering deals off the coast of Cuba with Fidel Castro and Prince Namor."

In 2008, Jason Aaron concluded the fourth volume of Black Panther with a war story about battling a Skrull invasion of Wakanda, tying in with Marvel's Secret Invasion event. Black Panther vol. 5 launched in February 2009, with Hudlin, again scripting, introducing a successor Black Panther, T'Challa's sister Shuri. Hudlin co-wrote issue #7 with Jonathan Maberry, who then became the new writer.

=== 2010s ===
Both T'Challa and Shuri fight Doctor Doom, alongside members of the Fantastic Four and the X-Men, in the six-issue miniseries Doomwar (April – September 2010). Doomwar introduces the Midnight Angels, an armored division of the Dora Milaje. In this period, T'Challa has given up his powers and has been replaced by his sister. At the conclusion of the story, Doom steals Wakanda's supply of vibranium, and T'Challa destroys all of it in response.

T'Challa then accepts an invitation from Matt Murdock, the superhero Daredevil, to become the new protector of New York City's Hell's Kitchen neighborhood. Under writer David Liss and artist Francesco Francavilla, he became the lead character in Daredevil beginning with issue #513 (February 2011); the series was retitled Black Panther: The Man Without Fear. He takes on the identity of Mr. Okonkwo, an immigrant from the Democratic Republic of the Congo, and becomes the owner of a small diner to be close to the people. He fights street crime and various enemies of Daredevil, in this case relying on his own athletic ability and without the traditional Black Panther powers and Wakandan technology. He also confronts a new version of the Hate-Monger, a Silver Age emblem of bigotry who represents contemporary racist and anti-immigrant ideology. In Fantastic Four #608, written by Jonathan Hickman, T'Challa again meets the Panther god Bast. Bast reveals that catastrophe will come to Wakanda and that T'Challa will need to be reborn as a new Black Panther. His restored powers exceed his previous strength, and he is also given the collective memories of all the previous Black Panthers. Black Panther then takes part in the Avengers vs. X-Men event. As a result of this conflict, his marriage to Storm is annulled.

For three years, beginning in 2013, Black Panther did not have in his own solo title but instead appeared as one of the primary members of New Avengers, written by Jonathan Hickman. Hickman later recalled that this was a conscious cross-media marketing plan to lead toward a relaunch of Black Panther coinciding with the feature film. In this series, Black Panther works together with a secret team of the most powerful heroes, the Illuminati. He often finds himself torn between the needs of his particular nation and more global concerns. In particular, he has a mortal conflict with Namor, who is responsible for a bloody invasion of Wakanda. Black Panther then joins The Ultimates, written by Al Ewing. The group battles Galactus.

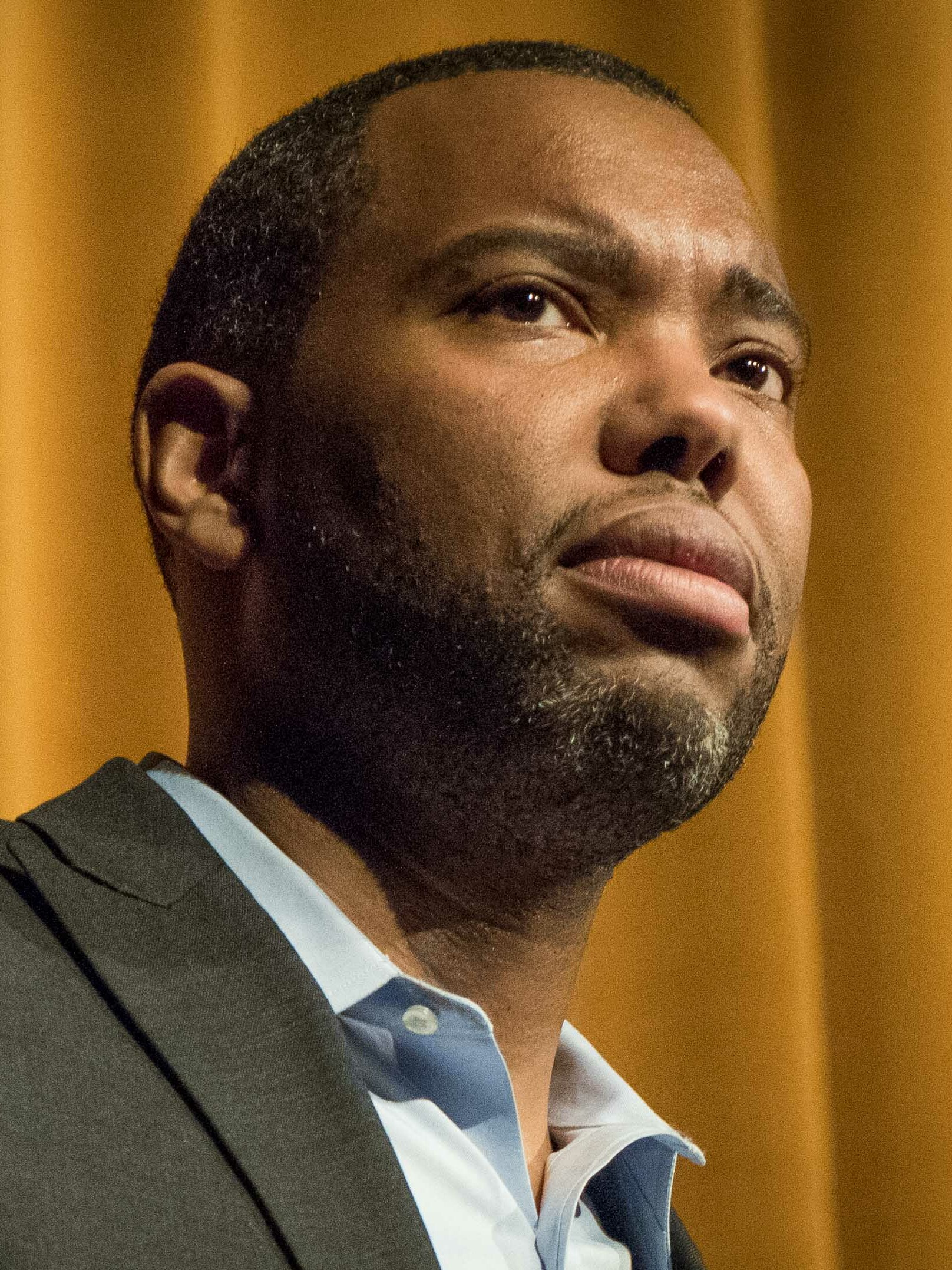
Ta-Nehisi Coates wrote a number of best-selling Black Panther series in the 2010s.

A new Black Panther series written by Ta-Nehisi Coates and drawn by Brian Stelfreeze was launched in 2016. Marvel intended the series to respond to contemporary social justice concerns. Coates was previously a correspondent for The Atlantic and won the National Book Award for his essay Between the World and Me. As Todd Steven Burroughs writes, "The announcement that Ta-Nehisi Coates––the writer whom Toni Morrison called the heir to novelist and essayist James Baldwin––was going to write a new, ongoing Black Panther title shook both the Marvel Universe and café society." In Coates's first storyline, titled A Nation Under Our Feet, T'Challa faces a popular uprising against his monarchy. At the conclusion of the story, Wakanda is reformed into a constitutional democracy, with the Black Panther continuing as a figurehead king rather than a ruler. This series introduces a new version of The Crew, now including Storm, Luke Cage, Misty Knight, and Manifold. According to Diamond Comic Distributors, Black Panther (2016) #1 was the best-selling comic book in April 2016, while #2 was the 9th best-selling comic book in May 2016. Critic Todd Steven Burroughs characterizes the story as "ultra-cerebral", and suggests that some of the previous authors of the character may have found it pretentious. He interprets the story as a fascinating deconstruction of Wakanda that removes "what [Coates] might call the intellectual crutch of Black nationalism" from the mythos of Black Panther.

In Coates' second storyline, Avengers of the New World, Wakanda's mythology was expanded, showing the panther goddess Bast as a member of a pantheon known as the Orisha. (Note: The Orishas are deities of the Yoruba religion. Yoruba is one of the official languages of Wakanda.) Coates also wrote a six-issue series called Black Panther and the Crew that addresses the problem of police killings and also suggests that the Marvel universe includes a number of previously unknown superheroes from the Bandung Conference. Coates also co-wrote a new series called Black Panther: World of Wakanda together with Roxane Gay that detailed more about the Dora Milaje. In 2017, the Africanfuturist writer Nnedi Okorafor wrote the series Black Panther: Long Live the King.

In February 2018, Christopher Priest, Don McGregor, and Reginald Hudlin each contributed one story to the Black Panther Annual #1. In spring 2018, Coates wrote a new Black Panther series; titled The Intergalactic Empire of Wakanda, this is a space opera. According to Diamond Comic Distributors, Black Panther (2018) #1 was the fifth best-selling comic book in May 2018.

=== 2020s ===
In 2021, John Ridley wrote a new five-issue Black Panther series. According to Diamond Comic Distributors, Black Panther (2021) #1 was the 10th best-selling comic book in November 2021. Hannibal Tabu of Bleeding Cool gave Black Panther (2021) #1 a grade of 8.5 out of 10, saying, "T'Challa's secret balances both the old ways of Wakanda as personified by the White Wolf and the modern egalitarian Wakanda he's trying to build. Then there's the visual storytelling from Juann Cabal, Federico Blee, and Joe Sabino, which will tickle the fancy of fans of, well, any Marvel project featuring Sebastian Stan, basically. They feature a great Avengers fight scene (that also mixes in wonderful character work) with a gorgeous view of an evolving Wakanda." Tim Adams of ComicBook.com gave Black Panther #1 a grade of 4 out of 5, saying, "Marvel's new era of Black Panther gets off to a captivating start. Whereas the previous volume by Ta-Nehisi Coates and Daniel Acuna primarily took place in the stars, John Ridley, Juann Cabal, and Federico Blue deliver the beginnings of an espionage tale. Marvel Stormbreaker artist Juann Cabal is quickly rising as a superstar artist after fan-favorite runs on X-23 and Guardians of the Galaxy."

Stephanie Williams and Paco Medina produced the five-issue limited series Wakanda (October 2022-February 2023), with a backup series titled History of the Black Panthers, written by Evan Narcisse and illustrated by Natacha Bustos. Bryan Edward Hill and Alberto Foche created the one-shot Black Panther: Unconquered (November 2022). In January 2023, a new Black Panther series was announced, written by Eve Ewing and illustrated by Chris Allen. According to the ComicHub system at local comic book shops selling American comics, Black Panther (2023) #1 was the 11th best-selling comic book in June 2023. Hannah Rose of Comic Book Resources wrote, "Black Panther #1 is a subtle and humane study of a changing character and shifting fictional landscape. Although a slow burn in turns of action, and offers questions with no easy answers, this issue is worth checking out precisely for those reasons."

In 2024, Bryan Edward Hill wrote Ultimate Black Panther with art by Stefano Caselli, which takes place in an alternate continuity from the mainstream Marvel universe. The comic is about Black Panther defending the continent of Africa from the deities Khonshu and Ra. Hill said "I was invigorated by this opportunity because in addition to my immense respect for Jonathan Hickman's detailed storytelling, the idea of shepherding this bold new take on Black Panther in this event gives me a platform to do the kind of broad, epic, storytelling I've always wanted to do in comics. My influences range from the history of Black Panther comics, to Ryan Coogler's incredible work with the recent films, to Frank Herbert's world-building capacity of Dune."

== Characterization ==
=== Fictional character biography ===
T'Challa is born in Wakanda to T'Chaka, the Black Panther, and Queen N'Yami. N'Yami dies in childbirth, and T'Chaka's second wife, Ramonda, gives birth to Shuri. Ramonda vanishes shortly after. T'Challa defeats his uncle during a ritual event; this earns him the right to ingest a powerful ancestral heart-shaped herb. The herb gives him superhuman strength and speed, and he inherits the title of Black Panther. However, in T'Challa's boyhood Klaw invades Wakanda and murders T'Chaka during an attempt to seize Wakanda's valuable natural resource, vibranium. T'Challa and the Wakandans drive Klaw from the country and wound him. As an adolescent, T'Challa goes on a walkabout manhood ritual and meets a young orphan in Cairo, Ororo Munroe (who will later become known as Storm). He is sent abroad and graduates from Oxford University. He travels the world and returns to claim his throne in Wakanda.

Klaw returns to Wakanda to resume his attempt to steal the vibranium; this time, he is equipped with strange new weapons based on sound. T'Challa invites the Fantastic Four to Wakanda, then attacks and attempts to neutralize them individually. He does this to test himself as preparation to battle Klaw, and to test the Fantastic Four's abilities so they can help him. The Fantastic Four and T'Challa learn mutual respect for one another and team up to defeat Klaw together. T'Challa later leaves Wakanda and joins the Avengers, on Captain America's recommendation. T'Challa later reveals that he joined the team in order to spy on them and determine their possible effects on Wakanda's national interest. He lives in New York City and works as an inner-city school teacher under the secret identity "Luke Charles". He meets and establishes a relationship Monica Lynn, a soul singer, who accompanies him on his return to Wakanda. However, upon his return, T'Challa finds that Erik Killmonger, a Wakandan who was exiled to the U.S. because his father assisted Klaw, is prepared to usurp his title. T'Challa eventually defeats Killmonger in a battle atop a waterfall. Along with Lynne, T'Challa then leaves Wakanda again to investigate the murder of Lynne's sister. He determines that the Ku Klux Klan are to blame, and defeats them in combat as well. In later adventures, he reunites with his stepmother Ramonda and confronts apartheid in South Africa. He enters into conflict with a rival monarch, Namor of Atlantis. He also works together with a staffer of the United States Department of State, Everett K. Ross, and a team of female bodyguards called the Dora Milaje. He leaves Monica Lynn, re-connects with Storm, and deals with a renegade Dora Milaje named Nakia who feels jilted by him and seeks revenge. Erik Killmonger returns and destabilizes the economy of Wakanda in a renewed effort to conquer it. Killmonger defeats T'Challa and becomes a new Black Panther, but he is poisoned by the heart-shaped herb during his ascension ceremony. Killmonger is rendered comatose and T'Challa returns to his position.

Later, T'Challa finds he has a brain aneurysm and succumbs to instability and hallucinations. After his mental state almost causes tribal warfare, the Panther hands power to his council and hides in New York City. While recovering, he trains a police officer, Kasper Cole, to be the new Black Panther. T'Challa eventually recovers, Cole becomes White Tiger, and T'Challa returns to Wakanda.

Klaw again attempts to invade Wakanda and to cause a war with Wakanda's neighbor, Niganda. The U.S. government sends an army of Deathloks, cyborg warriors, to occupy Wakanda and fight Klaw. It becomes evident that Klaw's invasion is actually a ruse to advance U.S. Imperialism. Klaw holds T'Challa's mother hostage, but he refuses to negotiate. Black Panther and the Wakandans successfully defeat the Deathloks and Klaw.

T'Challa marries Storm. They tour the world. Black Panther and Storm side with Captain America against Iron Man in the civil war among superheroes sparked by the superhero registration initiative. They then temporarily join the Fantastic Four. Killmonger again tries to conquer Wakanda, but he is killed by Monica Rambeau. Storm and Black Panther then repel another invasion, from the alien Skrulls.

Storm returns to the X-Men and Black Panther returns to Wakanda. T'Challa suffers a brutal attack after meeting with Doctor Doom and Namor. His sister Shuri is trained as the next Black Panther. T'Challa is temporarily in a coma; the supervillain Morlun tries to devour his body. Shuri rescues her brother from Morlun, and is officially inaugurated as a new Black Panther while T'Challa recovers. T'Challa and Shuri team up to fight Doctor Doom, along with the Fantastic Four, the X-Men, and Deadpool. T'Challa remains wounded, so he is mystically charged by a Wakandan healer. Now returned to power, T'Challa leads a Dora Milaje army. However, because Doom is on the verge of taking control of Wakanda's vibranium, T'Challa takes the desperate measure of de-powering all of it. Now stripped of his power, T'Challa leaves Wakanda, while Shuri searches the world for new vibranium. Matt Murdock (the superhero Daredevil) asks T'Challa to replace him as guardian of Hell's Kitchen, while Murdock takes a leave of absence. T'Challa takes on a new secret identity in New York, presenting himself as "Mr. Okonkwo", an immigrant from the Democratic Republic of the Congo and a manager of a restaurant. Simultaneously, he takes on Daredevil's job as a crime-fighter.

Upon his return to Wakanda, T'Challa serves as a second to his sister, Shuri, who remains the kingdom's active ruler. T'Challa calls on the Fantastic Four to help him with conflict with Necropolis, a tomb below Wakanda. T'Challa meets Bast, the Panther god, who shows him prophecies of future disasters and restores all of his Black Panther powers so that he will be able to face these challenges. He also gains all the collective memories of previous Black Panthers. Shortly after, the Avengers come into conflict with the X-Men. Empowered by the Phoenix, Namor destroys Wakanda with a massive tidal wave. Returning to help, Storm is stunned when the Panther informs her that their marriage has been annulled because of her connection to her fellow mutant, Namor.

T'Challa calls on an elite and secret group of superheroes to face a new threat to the universe and all alternative universes. This group, the Illuminati, includes Mister Fantastic, Doctor Strange, Iron Man, Black Bolt, Beast, and Namor. T'Challa has discovered incursions from parallel Earths that could lead to the destruction of universes. T'Challa must temporarily put his animosity toward Namor aside, though Black Panther vows to kill Namor when the crisis passes. Wakanda launches a secret attack on Atlantis, Namor's kingdom, just as Thanos invades Earth. Namor deceives Thanos and leads him to attack Wakanda. The Avengers defeat Thanos, but Shuri learns about T'Challa's collaboration with Namor in the Illuminati. In response to T'Challa's refusal to disclose the extent of their activities, she expels him from Wakandan leadership. T'Challa is also called upon to destroy a parallel world in order to preserve his own. He is unwilling to do so, and the spirit of his father strips him of the Black Panther powers as a result. Namor then destroys the parallel planet himself and reveals his role in sending Thanos to Wakanda; T'Challa tries to kill him, and the Illuminati expel him from their group. Namor takes over the Necropolis, beneath Wakanda, and T'Challa and Shuri invade this subterranean city. T'Challa ultimately works together with the Illuminati to defeat Namor. T'Challa is able to transport Namor to another world and abandon him there. However, the various universes continue to collide and threaten all of existence. Doctor Doom, however, is able to create a new reality with himself in control. T'Challa and Namor are forced to join forces to eventually defeat Doom and restore the previously existing universe. T'Challa joins a new group called the Ultimates in order to fight Galactus.

Shuri appears to have been killed by invaders. T'Challa loses his connection with Bast, and his people begin calling him Haramu-Fal, meaning "the Orphan King". Wakanda is damaged and lacking in resources and connections as a result of the various invasions and wars. Wakanda experiences a national crisis as a result of its economic and political difficulties, loss of life, and the blow to their pride as a historically undefeated nation. A political conflict takes place when two of the Dora Milaje attempt to protect women from rape by foreign chieftains and are punished for doing so by Wakanda authorities. They respond by rejecting Wakandan authority and creating their own outpost. Partly as a result of this conflict, Wakandans generally become skeptical of the monarchy. This natural discontent is exploited by Zenzi, who works together with an American businessman to overthrow T'Challa. At the same time, a university professor named Changamire spreads democratic ideas among Wakandans. An insurgency develops against the Black Panther, and T'Challa consults with various dictators. Black Panther forms a new group called the Crew, including Storm and Luke Cage in order to counter this insurgency. T'Challa recruits Changamire to mediate the conflict.

Shuri is revealed to be comatose rather than dead. Her soul is transported to a new realm of Wakandan memory. She learns about their culture prior to the discovery of vibranium. T'Challa works together with Eden Fesi to recover Shuri. She becomes a new being, Aja-Adanna, who can maintain all Wakandan memory. Shuri can then consult T'Challa on the future of the nation. Shuri now has the ability to transform into a flock of black birds, a single large black bird, or a stone. Shuri helps to reconcile T'Challa with the dissident elements of the Dora Milaje. Wakanda embarks on a new path toward a democracy, with monarchy only performing a ceremonial role.

It is revealed that T'Challa had previously sent a team to space to investigate the meteorite that brought vibranium to Wakanda, but that these explorers were pulled back into the past thousands of years. As a result, they founded their own kingdom far off in the cosmos, called the Intergalactic Empire of Wakanda. This empire is eventually led by N'Jadaka. N'Jadaka erases T'Challa's memory and makes him a slave to the empire. T'Challa maintains some trace of his previous experiences, particularly his love for Storm, and this allows him to overcome the mind-wipe and to found a rebel group. His memories are then restored by the god Bast. T'Challa leads an army of Earth's superheroes to defeat N'Jadaka.

=== Personality and motivations ===
T'Challa is a shrewd political actor whose main concern is the survival and prosperity of his nation, Wakanda. Tom Brevoort, an editor of Black Panther stories at Marvel, says that Black Panther is unique because of his strategic planning. McGregor's stories establish that he is emotionally intelligent and naturally intuitive, rather than aristocratic. He is extraordinarily skilled in combat, but often applies deception and strategy to achieve his goals. While he often works independently or alongside the Avengers in order to achieve the collective good, he also has the vast resources of Wakanda at his disposal. In Ta-Nahesi Coates's characterization, T'Challa has an adventurous spirit and does not actually enjoy the burden of being king.

== Powers, abilities and equipment ==
Black Panther has acute senses as well as extraordinary "speed, strength, reflexes, durability, healing, and stamina." These capacities partly come from his own training and partly from the properties of a Wakandan heart-shaped herb. The relationship between the heart-shaped herb and Wakanda's vibranium resources is unclear.

Black Panther has "peak human" athletic abilities and is one of the most effective fighters in hand-to-hand combat in the Marvel Universe. In his first published appearance, he holds his own against all of the members of the Fantastic Four single-handedly. For decades after, he was represented as much less formidable, with no distinct powers. Christopher Priest believes this was one of the reasons why the character was under-utilized.

In his contemporary incarnation, he has an armored, bulletproof suit with razor-sharp claws in its finger gauntlets. His mask includes communications equipment, his eye lenses can read ultraviolet and infrared signals, his suit can switch to a camouflage mode, and he has vibranium lacing in his soles to absorb impact. In addition, he has special armor for unusual occasions. Black Panther is unique among superheroes in that he generally has the resources of an entire nation supporting him.

== Themes and motifs ==
=== Racism and Black pride ===
While the early writers of the story were white men, the subsequent authors Priest, Hudlin, and Coates are all Black American men. These writers used the character also to comment on US racism and stereotypes. For example, a cognitive psychologist has argued that Priest's depiction of assumptions made by white characters in his stories are an early media representation of microaggressions. This is particularly evinced in the character of Everett Ross, who is constantly misunderstanding his experiences of Africa and Black people because of his unconscious prejudices. Particularly in the Reginald Hudlin period, Black Panther is positioned as a uniquely Black superhero, representing the best and most powerful aspects of contemporary Black masculinity. Reginald Hudlin, one of the character's most decisive writers, argues that Black Panther is "the African equivalent of Captain America. Both represent the best of their nations. Not just physically but as moral paragons."

=== Colonialism and decolonization ===
The stories also explore imaginary approaches to the circumstances, opportunities, and difficulties of small, resource-rich nations in the Global South. Black Panther's character and his fictional kingdom, Wakanda, constitute an early example of what was later called Afrofuturism. As Scott Bukatman writes, Wakanda is "an African nation never conquered, never colonized, never subservient. Small wonder Wakanda was foundational to the ethos and aesthetic later labeled Afrofuturist." Black Panther's first story also establishes that Wakanda is in possession of a valuable natural resource (vibranium) and that various powers wish to violate Wakanda's sovereignty in order to obtain that resource. While Lee and Kirby disavowed political motivation, historians of popular culture have commented on the coincidence of Black Panther's creation at the same time as Third World revolutionary movements and US Black Power organizations, such as the Black Panther Party and the Student Nonviolent Coordinating Committee. Adilifu Nama reads T'Challa as "an idealized composite of third-world Black revolutionaries and the anticolonialist movement of the 1950s that they represented," and compares him to Jomo Kenyatta, Patrice Lumumba, and Kwame Nkrumah. However, while many third-world revolutionaries believed in some version of socialism, Wakanda is portrayed as a monarchy. Moreover, while African independence movements were usually skeptical of US national interests they perceived as imperialist, Black Panther is a friendly ally of Captain America and other American superheroes. Martin Lund suggests that the early appearances of Black Panther are partly meant to suggest a clearly anti-communist model of independent African state, to calm Western anxieties about decolonization. Later writers of Black Panther comics such as Ta-Nehisi Coates, Roxane Gay, and Nnedi Okorafor, in the 2010s and '20s, explicitly make the ideal of monarchy problematic and strive to portray a more democratic and inclusive vision of African nationalism. Coates and Gay also emphasize the agency of women and lesbian characters.

=== Challenges and transformation of the human body ===
The series often emphasizes the vulnerability of the human body, or, conversely, a technologically armored heroic body. In Billy Graham's illustrations for Don McGregor's 1970s Black Panther stories, his costume is often destroyed and he is frequently depicted as resisting or overcoming immense exertion or suffering. Todd Steven Burroughs describes McGregor's rendition of the Panther as "a kind of warrior-priest who could endure suffering as well as any Hindu yogi." In contrast, Priest's and Hudlin's runs of Black Panther depict him as extraordinarily powerful, with an armored, bulletproof suit that is rarely damaged. In addition, the later version of the Panther suit includes razor-sharp claws.

== Supporting characters ==
=== Allies ===
Black Panther draws from the combat skills of his bodyguards, the Dora Milaje. When facing cosmic threats, he works together with the Avengers, and has a particularly respectful relationship with Captain America. He also works together with the Crew, which includes Luke Cage and Misty Knight. T'Challa also sometimes works together with an agent of the Central Intelligence Agency, Everett Ross, who is generally hapless.

=== Other Black Panthers ===
The mantle of the Black Panther is passed down from generation to generation among the rulers of Wakanda. In the diegetic world of the character, there have been thousands of Black Panthers. In the comics, these include a Stone-Age Black Panther named Mosi. During World War II, the Panther was named T'Chanda, who first defeated Captain America and then allied with him to fight the Nazis.

T'Challa's father is T'Chaka. After having married a woman named N'Yami, believing she cannot have children, he adopts a child with her, Hunter; however, she later becomes pregnant and dies giving birth to her first child, T'Challa; from the relationship with a woman of another tribe T'Chaka then has a second son, Jakarra, and finally remarries with Ramonda, with whom he has his only daughter, Shuri. To protect the kingdom, T'Chaka instituted a policy of strong isolationism. He is killed by Ulysses Klaw after having surprised him when he was trying to illegally extract vibranium in his kingdom.

Erik Killmonger challenges and beats T'Challa in a duel for the throne, overthrowing him as king of Wakanda and taking on the role as the Black Panther. He becomes comatose after attempting to ingest the heart-shaped herb to acquire the Black Panther's powers, as he is not of royal blood.

When T'Challa ends up in a coma because of Doctor Doom, Shuri becomes his substitute as the Black Panther and queen of Wakanda which, after the rise of her half-brother to "king of the dead" creates, for the first time in history, two avatars of the Panther Goddess.

=== Romantic interests ===
In the Don McGregor period, T'Challa's romantic partner was Monica Lynne, an African-American singer. He also had a long-standing relationship with Ororo Munroe, also known as Storm of the X-Men, and they were married for years. Since their divorce, they maintain a close and intimate relationship.

=== Villains ===
T'Challa has frequently battled Erik Killmonger, his rival for the throne of Wakanda. He is also frequently in conflict with Doctor Doom and Namor.

== Cultural impact and legacy ==
Black Panther became widely popular since the release of the film Black Panther in 2018. Many sources have commended the significance of the character, particularly with regard to the representation of Black people. Laura Bradley of Vanity Fair included Black Panther in their "Stan Lee's Most Iconic Characters" list, describing him as the "first superhero of African descent in the comics world." Fred Bluden of Screen Rant asserts, "As a technological genius, diplomat, statesman, and superhero, Black Panther helped to encourage the creation of other prominent black superheroes who were more than stereotypes. As a character, and a cultural milestone, his importance cannot be overstated." The A.V. Club ranked Black Panther 1st in their "100 Best Marvel Characters" list. Joseph J. Darowski, in the introduction to The Ages of Black Panther: Essays on the King of Wakanda, argues that "The Black Panther's place in popular culture history is secured even as it is constantly evolving." Darren Franich of Entertainment Weekly ranked Black Panther 26th in their "Let's Rank Every Avenger Ever" list, writing, "The Black Panther has one of the most interesting backstory/mythologies in comic books." Wizard Magazine ranked Black Panther 79th in their "200 Greatest Comic Book Character of All Time" list.

In 2020, following the death of Chadwick Boseman, Disneyland unveiled a mural at Anaheim's Downtown representing the actor giving the Wakanda salute to a young fan wearing a Black Panther mask. In 2021, a wax figure of T'Challa / Black Panther was unveiled at Madame Tussauds London, inspired by the Marvel Cinematic Universe (MCU) incarnation of the character. In 2022, BuyCostumes.com announced that T'Challa's Black Panther costume was the 8th most popular Halloween costume for kids.

In 2022, British-American publisher Penguin Random House published a Penguin Classics edition of the Black Panther comics, as part of a line of Penguin Classics editions of various Marvel comics.

== In other media ==
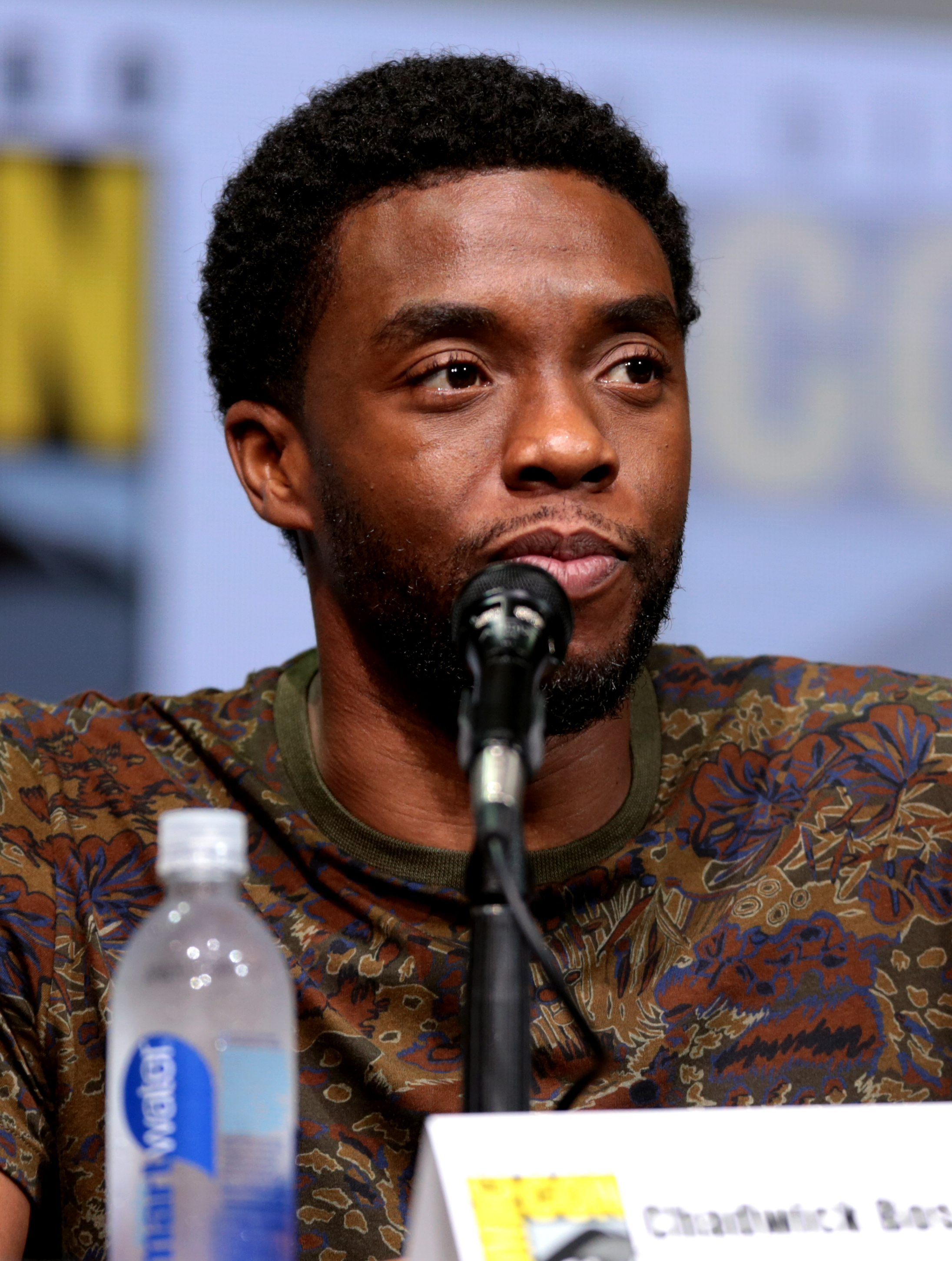
Boseman at the 2017 San Diego Comic-Con.

In 2018, Marvel Studios released a film adaptation titled Black Panther, starring Chadwick Boseman as T'Challa and directed by Ryan Coogler. Black Panther was met with positive reviews from film critics. It became the highest-grossing solo superhero film of all time and the highest-grossing film by an African-American director It is the fifth MCU film and 33rd overall to surpass $1 billion, It made history as the first superhero film to be nominated for the Academy Award for Best Picture. Chadwick Boseman also portrayed T'Challa / Black Panther in other media set in the Marvel Cinematic Universe. T'Challa also appears in the live-action films Captain America: Civil War (2016), Avengers: Infinity War (2018), and Avengers: Endgame (2019). Boseman voices alternate timeline versions of T'Challa in season one of the Disney+ animated series What If...?, which was released posthumously. In Black Panther: Wakanda Forever (2022), T'Challa's sister Shuri (portrayed by Letitia Wright) takes over the mantle of the Black Panther.

Black Panther's first animated appearance was in Fantastic Four, voiced by Keith David. Black Panther makes a non-speaking cameo appearance in the X-Men: The Animated Series episode "Sanctuary". According to producer Larry Houston, there was a project for a solo Black Panther animated series at the time. However, the series never materialized. In X-Men '97, the Black Panther cameo is retconned to be T'Chaka (voiced by Isaac Robinson-Smith). Technically, the X-Men and Fantastic Four animated series are not set in the exact same shared universe, despite occasional crossovers.

In 2010, he later appeared in a self-titled animated TV series on Black Entertainment Television, voiced by Djimon Hounsou. This series was a literal adaptation of Reginald Hudlin's arc of the comic series. Subsequently, Black Panther appeared as a supporting character in The Avengers: Earth's Mightiest Heroes and Avengers Assemble, voiced by James C. Mathis III. The fifth season of Avengers Assemble is named "Black Panther's Quest", with the narrative focus on Black Panther, Shuri, and Wakanda rather than the Avengers. For young children, the Black Panther appears in Spidey and His Amazing Friends, voiced by Tru Valentino. Eyes of Wakanda, a spin-off animated series about Wakanda's history set in the Marvel Cinematic Universe, was released in 2025.

Black Panther has also featured in several video games, such as Marvel: Ultimate Alliance, voiced by Phil LaMarr.

== See also ==
- African characters in comics
- American comic books
