= Ultimate Invasion =

Marvel Comics limited series

- Cover of Ultimate Invasion #2 (July 2023). Art by Bryan Hitch.

Publication information
- Publisher: Marvel Comics
- Format: Limited series
- Genre: Superhero
- Publication date: June – September 2023
- No. of issues: 4
- Main character(s): Maker; Howard Stark; Illuminati

Creative team
- Written by: Jonathan Hickman
- Penciller: Bryan Hitch
- Inker: Andrew Currie
- Letterer: Joe Caramagna
- Colorist: Alex Sinclair
- Editors: Wil Moss; Assistant Editor: Michelle Marchese

Ultimate Invasion is a four-issue American comic book limited series written by Jonathan Hickman, drawn by Bryan Hitch and colored by Alex Sinclair. The first issue was published by Marvel Comics on June 21, 2023. The storyline shows Maker (the Reed Richards of Earth-1610) manipulating a new Earth called Earth-6160.

== Plot ==
The Maker escapes his imprisonment at the Blaakguard Building and escapes to Earth-6160. There, he alters the universe's history to his liking, averting the origins of many of its heroes. He places Loki on the throne of Asgard, delays the rocket launch that would have resulted in the formation of the Fantastic Four, and establishes a domed enclave called the City at Latveria as his seat of power as he creates a new world order. On Earth-6160, 15-year old Peter Parker and Liz Allan arrive at a demonstration of the Isotope Genome Accelerator. When a spider gets affected by its radioactive waves, it tries to bite Peter only for the Maker to smack it and contain its corpse, preventing him from obtaining powers.

Howard Stark is the Iron Man of this Earth, with his teenage son Tony Stark working at Stark/Stane. He and Obadiah Stane are called to the City for an international event of incorporated nation-states, with both representing the North American Union. After Stane is killed in a suicide bombing, the Maker shows Stark the Immortus Engine, a time machine which he used to reshape Earth-6160. The Maker removes his helmet to show a missing part of his head from an earlier attack, stating it will take time for him to heal. He goes on to state to Stark that he needs him because of his theory that Stark built the Engine.

Following Stane's death, Stark is inducted into the Maker's council. Hulk explains that the world leaders operate together in a manufactured war economy in which each power bloc takes turns in playing the role of a rogue state, as the Maker's philosophies state that perpetual global peace is impossible and conflict is necessary for stable societies. One day prior, at the City, the Maker takes Stark to meet Reed Richards. In the far future, the clones are assembled by Kang, accustomed with his own Iron Man-like suit, who plans to finally end the Maker.

One week later, Stark prepares to give the Engine to the Maker. He remarks that the original Engine was made by someone else, most likely the Maker from the past, with the Maker remarking that he may take it to his past self and then make his own Engine, continuing the loop. Stark tells the Maker he has grown tired over having to choose between either him or Kang and has Richards shut down the shield surrounding the City to allow Kang and army to arrive and seal the dome shut with them inside. In the Maker's absence, his council divides power among themselves, while Tony dubs himself Iron Lad. In an epilogue, Iron Lad and Reed Richards uncover Captain America's frozen body.

=== Epilogue (Ultimate Universe #1 one-shot) ===
Two weeks have passed since The City was sealed. Richards has taken up the name of Doom as he and Iron Lad spring Thor from his cell in Asgard. Doom explains that the Maker comes from another universe and made Earth-6160 in his image by averting the origins of its heroes, and that they are working to undo his changes. Tony reveals the Maker helped Loki kill Odin and steal Thor's birthright. Thor agrees to help them, with Sif states that she will stick around.

The four make it to the Maker's castle in Latveria and enter a room filled with different repositories. Sif speculates that each one must contain a relic of a stolen life, with Doom stating each one "holds around a hundred". Before they make plans, they are ambushed by Henri Duggary, who wounds Thor and knocks down the rest before Iron Lad fires a repulsor blast at his face. After Thor manages to the transport the group and one repository back to Stark Tower, Iron Lad heals Thor as Doom finds a spider in the repository. In Latveria, the Maker's council attacks Stark Tower, framing Iron Lad and his allies as terrorists in a false flag attack. Iron Lad secretly survives along with his allies, suggesting the forming of a resistance effort against the council.

== Publication history ==
Ultimate Invasion is a four-issue Marvel Comics limited series written by Jonathan Hickman, drawn by Bryan Hitch and colored by Alex Sinclair, which reintroduces the Ultimate Comics universe created by Brian Michael Bendis. Originally, Donny Cates was going to write Ultimate Invasion, as it follows up on his inclusion of the Maker in his Venom run, but after he got into a severe car accident, Hickman was brought on board as the new writer, ultimately going in a different direction. Cates was given a special thanks in the credits of the first issue.

Hickman, in an interview, said "[Revisiting the idea of Ultimate Comics] couldn't be replicating or revisiting what Brian did in the original Ultimates - creating a streamlined, modernized version that would eventually become the spine of the MCU, and it certainly couldn't be what I did, which was a final chapter of a pre-existing universe. We also thought the very idea of Ultimate Comics needed to be inverted from what the original universe was - we wanted this to be something that could really only exist in the comic space: a new way of thinking about, and enjoying, a new version of the Marvel Universe. I'm pretty happy to say that it feels like we’ve accomplished those things and we’re very excited for everyone to get to read it."

== Titles involved ==
- Ultimate Invasion #1–4
- Ultimate Universe #1

== Reception ==
Audience reception to Ultimate Invasion has been highly positive. On the League of Comic Geeks website, 97% of readers like Ultimate Invasion #1, with a 4.1/5 average rating. 95% of readers like Ultimate Invasion #2, with a 4.1/5 average rating. The entire event was released to mixed reviews from critics however, with critics giving the event an average rating of 7.3 out of 10 based on 42 reviews.

Issue	Release date	Critic rating	Critic reviews	Ref.
#1	June 21, 2023	7.8/10	15	
#2	July 26, 2023	7.8/10	9	
#3	August 30, 2023	7.3/10	10	
#4	September 27, 2023	6.5/10	8	

== Future ==
In June 2023, it was reported that the end of Ultimate Invasion will lead to a new line of titles in the Ultimate Universe line.

The first line of Ultimate Comics titles was announced in October 2023, with:

- Ultimate Spider-Man by Jonathan Hickman and Marco Checchetto, which debuted in January 2024
- Ultimate Black Panther by Bryan Hill and Stefano Caselli, which debuted in February 2024
- Ultimate X-Men by Peach Momoko, which debuted in March 2024
- The Ultimates by Deniz Camp and Juan Frigueri, which debuted in June 2024

Later, other comics were announced:

- Ultimate Universe: One Year In a one-shot by Deniz Camp and Jonas Sharf, which debuted in December 2024
- Ultimate Wolverine by Chris Condon and Alessandro Cappuccio, which debuted in January 2025
- Ultimate Spider-Man: Incursion
- Ultimate Hawkeye
- Ultimate Universe: Two Years In
- Ultimate Endgame

== Collected editions ==
Title	Material collected	Publication date	ISBN
Ultimate Invasion	Ultimate Invasion #1–4	March 26, 2024	978-0785194736
The Ultimates, Volume 1: Fix the World	Ultimate Universe one-shot; The Ultimates #1–6; Material from Free Comic Book Day 2024: Ultimate Universe/Spider-Man	February 4, 2025	978-1302957513
