= Ultimate Wolverine =

Comic book series

- First issue cover by Alessandro Cappuccio and Frank Martin

Publication information
- Publisher: Marvel Comics
- Schedule: Monthly
- Format: Limited
- Publication date: January 2025 – April 2026
- No. of issues: 16
- Main character(s): Wolverine; Rasputin Family; Opposition

Creative team
- Written by: Chris Condon
- Artist: Alessandro Cappuccio
- Colorist: Bryan Valenza
- Editor: Wil Moss

Ultimate Wolverine is an ongoing comic book series written by Chris Condon, illustrated by Alessandro Cappuccio, and published by Marvel Comics primarily based on the character of Wolverine. This version of Wolverine serves as the Winter Soldier, utilized by the Maker's Council to maintain their control of the world. The character was debuted in the one-shot Ultimate Universe: One Year In in December 2024, before the series began in January 2025.

== Premise ==
Set in the Ultimate Universe of Earth-6160, the titular character serves as the Winter Soldier, a mutant created and deployed in the Eurasian Republic by Colossus, Magik, and Omega Red, who serve as the "Tsars of Russia and Limbo" and members of the Maker's Council. The first issue released on January 15, 2025.

== Plot ==
=== The Winter Soldier (#1-6) ===
Near the Eurasian Republic border that is close to Latveria, some soldiers are talking about Winter Soldier. They have heard rumors that he was originally a North American Union experiment gone wrong and was pieced together from the corpses of those who have died. Winter Soldier gets up and jumps out of the airplane without a parachute. He attacks a hideout of the Opposition that is run by Mystique and Nightcrawler. In flashbacks, the Winter Soldier is subjected to experiments that involve him being grievously injured and his memory wiped, with his healing factor enabling him to survive.

30 years ago in the North American Union, Professor Thorton records his latest research on how Weapon Alpha died moments after the adamantium-infusing procedure. The Maker comes in and hears of plans for a better world. After killing Thorton, Maker sees a picture of James Howlett and burns the building down. In the present, Winter Soldier attacks a group of soldiers and encounters Colossus, Magik, and Omega Red. After throwing Winter Soldier around, Colossus suggests testing him by sending some soldiers to fight him. The Winter Soldier slaughters the soldiers as the Rasputin family and Prostovich watch through surveillance cameras.

17 miles outside of Smolensk, Remy LeBeau / Gambit and Kitty Pryde meet with a woman who was sent by the Archangel. It is stated that Gambit and Kitty lost their prized possession Natasha Romanova, also known as Chyornaya Vdova, who they suspect has joined the Opposition. When the Winter Soldier attacks Vdova's truck and the mutant children onboard, Kitty recognizes him as Logan. After using her powers on Winter Soldier to restore his memories, Kitty kicks him off the truck.

After subduing the Winter Soldier, Prostovich surmises that something happened to him in the last mission. Prostovich enters a sphere beneath the Kremlin called the "Cerebellum" and has the Phoenix fix Logan's mind. A Directorate X log reveals that Charles Xavier's brain has been kept in cryogenic stasis after his death.

In Rasputingrad, a bar owner says goodbye to his patrons at closing time. While sweeping his bar, he tells Leech and Artie Maddicks that everyone is gone and that a driver from the Opposition will arrive soon. After serving the two food, the bar owner heads outside to throw out the garbage and is confronted by the Winter Soldier. A flashback reveals that the bar owner is Victor Creed as Logan has Creed promise to him that he will kill him if he becomes the Rasputin family's puppet. Back in the present, the fight is intensified as Creed rips off the mouth mask. Chyornaya Vdova shows up and hits the Winter Soldier with a dart while Creed tells Leech and Artie that their ride has arrived.

While chained up in a cell, Logan breaks free and is confronted by someone called "The One". He restrains Logan and sees how he was made a tool of the Rasputin family. After fighting through the hallucinations, Logan wakes up in the Opposition's headquarters and meets Abigail Brand, Chyornaya Vdova, Sabretooth, Beast, Leech, Artie, and Mikhail Rasputin. Beast discusses David Haller, who he had encountered in cyberspace. Beast placed David into his mainframe and eliminated his alternate personalities, causing him to become "The One". Without "The One", the opposition would have died off years ago. While Mikhail raises some questions, Beast thinks that David can be trusted.

=== Logan (#7-12) ===
Logan is visited by Kitty Pryde, who consoles him as they meet with Abigail Brand and Mikhail Rasputin. Meanwhile, Dr. Alongya Prostovich has taken notice that Winter Soldier has been gone for too long. Omega Red attacks Prostovich and drags her to join Magik in Limbo. Logan has a brief argument with Sabretooth over not fulfilling his promise on what to do if the Rasputin family caught him until Kitty breaks up the fight. In Limbo, Magik scolds Prostovich for her failure and summons her demons to swarm her. At the Opposition's headquarters, Mikhail welcomes the new recruits. Beast then enlists Gambit, Sprite, Widow, and Guardian to accompany him on the mission and even enlists Logan, who Beast has not come up with a codename for. Sabretooth comes up with "Rosomahka", which Widow translates as "Wolverine". Meanwhile, Magik and Omega Red return to Colossus with Prostovich, who states that she found a way to harness power from the Cerebellum and needs time to test it.

At Zmiiyi Island in the Black Sea, Wolverine accompanies Abigail Brand, Beast, Black Widow, Gambit, Guardian, and Sprite in raiding a mutant prison to free some guards. As Sprite phases through the wall, Wolverine tells Black Widow that there is something off, as he has not encountered any guards. Going further, the group comes across Warren Worthington III, who kills Brand and Beast before the remaining Opposition members subdue him. Wolverine hears scientist Dr. Stragatsky have a transmission with Alongya Prostovich on the status of the Angel specimen. It is then revealed that Stragatsky is dead and that Prostovich has not received a contact from anyone.

As some soldiers are overseeing the Sentinel operations, one member is informed that Alongya Prostovich has arrived to inspect the X-S units. When they go towards the Carrier Sentinel, they find it defaced with an X. After taking a Carrier Sentinel for their use that was modified by Daniel's F.O.R.G.E. group, Wolverine, Black Widow, Sabretooth, and Mikhail Rasputin attack Lysenko and Prostovich's facility. As the facility is compromised, Lysenko and Prostovich escape with X-S Unit One.

At the Chernobyl Nuclear Power Plant, Sabretooth tells Wolverine that he is leaving to take Artie Maddicks and Leech across the border. At the Kremlin, the Rasputin family learn that Mikhail is still alive, with Colossus killing one of his top soldiers over this discovery. Alongya Prostovich informs Colossus about the three Sentinels that survey the western border; they are unable to see where Chernobyl used to be as it is being shielded by someone who can control cyberspace. Later that night, Sabretooth leads Artie and Leech away from the headquarters. Upon getting to his feet, Wolverine sees Omega Red leading the Sentinels and other soldiers. Wolverine breaks free from Omega Red's tentacles, slashes Omega Red, and grabs the Muramasa Blade as the rest of the Opposition shows up to fight. Sometime later, Colossus receives a letter from Mikhail and Omega Red's head.

Amidst protests against the Rasputin family, Alongya Prostovich and the rest of Directorate X work on the Phoenix and the brain of Charles Xavier. Directorate X's Sentinels prepares the Cerebomb, an anti-mutant weapon, utilizing Xavier's brain. Meanwhile, Sabretooth is laying low with Artie Maddicks and Leech and contacts Wolverine, stating that the Rasputin family will not be pleased with what happened to Omega Red. The Cerebomb attacks and takes out Mikhail, Gambit, Sprite, Widow, Guardian, Angel, Iceman, and everyone in the blast radius.

Piloting Sentinel One, Wolverine arrives at the Eurasian Republic's capital in Moscow. Meanwhile, Dr. Lysenko informs Alongya Prostovich that the Phoenix specimen is rejecting the protocol without Xavier and that they cannot dissect the Phoenix early. Just then, Wolverine comes in through the window and kills Lysenko. Prostovich calls the X-S Units to protect her, but X-S Unit One is beheaded by Wolverine. Begging for mercy, Prostovich takes Wolverine to the Phoenix specimen. After the Phoenix specimen is freed, Colossus and Magik appear. Magik kills Prostovich while accusing her of helping the enemy. The Phoenix specimen gets up to help Wolverine and melts Colossus' body, while Magik flees. Wolverine evacuates the Phoenix as they are picked up by Sentinel One.

=== Issues #13-16 ===
Protests are occurring on the outskirts of Red Square, Moscow. While underground, Wolverine talks to Sentinel One about their next course of action. Sentinel One states that Jean Grey needs medicine as her body is failing and that they will need medicine from above. While traveling through the sewers, Wolverine encounters Ursa Major eating Crimson Dynamo's corpse. He figures out that Alongya Prostovich had manipulated Ursa Major's brain and decides to kill him. Wolverine makes his way out of the sewers and gets the medicine he needs.

In flashbacks, Magik met the ruler of Limbo and later gained control of the dimension. 40 miles outside of Luga, Wolverine, Jean Grey, and Sentinel One try and fail to find Magik. Wolverine goes into town to get some supplies and learns that a platoon of Eurasian Republic loyalists may be operating nearby. Wolverine finds the camp and takes out the loyalists. After subduing Lady Deathstrike, Grey gets into her mind and uncovers twenty possible locations where Magik may be.

On the outskirts of E.R., Chudei, near the Latverian border, Wolverine, Jean Grey, and Sentinel-One come across the aftermath of a massacre caused by a brainwashed soldier, who Wolverine ends up euthanizing. Just then, Wolverine starts losing control. Sentinel-One restrains Wolverine as Grey uses her Phoenix abilities to burn him back to normal. After regenerating, Logan tells them that he saw Magik in Limbo and knows how to get there.

In a flashback, Colossus finds his way into Limbo and reunites with Magik. At Balga Castle in the Eurasian Republic, Wolverine, Jean Grey, and Sentinel-One meet with a magic user who helps them get to Limbo. Wolverine and Grey enter Limbo and find the captive prisoners. As Grey frees the prisoners, Wolverine confronts Magik and impales her with his claws. Wolverine barely escapes Limbo along with Grey. Grey flies Wolverine away, with both knowing that they still have to deal with Maker.

== Characters ==
=== Main characters ===
- Wolverine / Winter Soldier / Logan - A mutant with healing powers and adamantium claws who is mind-controlled to serve the Rasputin family until he is freed by "The One".

=== Villains ===
- Colossus / Piotr Rasputin - The leader of the Rasputin family and member of Maker's Council that rules the Eurasian Republic. Killed by the Phoenix specimen.
- Magik / Illyana Rasputina - The sister of Colossus who is a part of the Rasputin family and member of Maker's Council. She is revealed to rule Limbo on the behalf of Maker's Council. (Note: As revealed in Ultimate Universe - One Year In #1.) Magik is later killed by Wolverine in Limbo.
- Omega Red / Arkady Rossovich - A mutant with carbonadium tentacles who is a part of the Rasputin family and member of Maker's Council. He is later beheaded by Wolverine using the Muramasa Blade offscreen with his head being sent to Colossus and Magik.
- Dr. Alongya Prostovich - A scientist and leader of Directorate X who worked on Logan. Prostovich was killed by Magik for giving in to Wolverine's demands to lower the Phoenix specimen.
  - Dr. Lysenko - A scientist and member of Directorate X.
- Lady Deathstrike - A cyborg working with the loyalists to the Rasputin family.

=== Other characters ===
- Mystique / Raven Darkholme - A shapeshifting member of the Opposition. She was taken down by Winter Soldier.
- Nightcrawler / Kurt Wagner - A demon-like teleporting member of the Opposition. He was taken down by Winter Soldier.
- Maker - A version of Mister Fantastic from Earth-1610 who traveled to Earth-6160 and altered its history.
- Professor Thorton - A top scientist in the Weapon X Project who was killed by Maker.
- Gambit / Remy LeBeau - A member of the Opposition who was responsible for the Mikhail Massacre, during which he supposedly killed Mikhail Rasputin. He was taken down by the Cerebomb.
- Sprite / Kitty Pryde - A member of the Opposition. She was taken down by the Cerebomb.
- Widow / Chyornaya Vdova / Natasha Romanova - A member of the Opposition. She was taken down by the Cerebomb.
- Phoenix specimen / Jean Grey - She is kept in a spherical structure beneath the Kremling by Directorate X and was used to control the other subjects. The Phoenix specimen is later freed by Wolverine as she helps him kill Colossus.
- Charles Xavier - He is mentioned to be dead. While his body is kept in stasis, Xavier's brain was removed and used for the Cerebomb.
- Sabretooth / Victor Creed - A member of the Opposition who knows Logan and secretly uses his bar to help the Opposition smuggle mutant refugees.
- Leech - A mutant refugee.
- Artie Maddicks - A mutant refugee.
- Archangel / Mikhail Rasputin - A member of the Rasputin family who was supposedly killed by Gambit in an event that became known as the Mikhail Massacre. In truth, he survived and sided with the Opposition using the codename "Archangel". Mikhail was taken down by the Cerebomb.
- The One / David Haller - A mutant with dissociative identity disorder whose consciousness was found in cyberspace and became an important member of the Opposition.
- Beast / Hank McCoy - An animalistic scientist and member of the Opposition. He was the one responsible for finding David Haller's consciousness in cyberspace and helped it overcome its personalities. Beast was killed by the Angel Specimen.
- Abigail Brand - A member of the Opposition. She was killed by the Angel Specimen.
- Guardian / Alexei Shostakov - A member of the Opposition. He was later taken down by the Cerebomb.
- Angel Specimen / Warren Worthington III - A mutant whose feathered wings were replaced with metal wings that was experimented on at a facility on Snake Island. He would later join the Opposition. Angel was later taken down by the Cerebomb.
- Daniel - A member of the Opposition's F.O.R.G.E. team.
- X-S Unit One / Scott Summers - An X-S Unit who has the head of Scott Summers in its torso. He is later killed by Wolverine.
- Iceman / Bobby Drake - A member of the Opposition. he was taken down by the Cerebomb.
- Marrow / Sarah - A member of the Opposition. He was taken down by the Cerebomb.
- Ursa Major - A mutant who can transform into a humanoid bear and was among those brainwashed by Dr. Alongya Prostovich to serve the Rasputin family and hunt the Opposition. Wolverine encounters Ursa Major in the sewers and kills him after realizing the extent of his brainwashing.
- Crimson Dynamo - He was brainwashed by Directorate X and used to hunt the Opposition. Wolverine later discovers that Crimson Dynamo has died, with his body being eaten by Ursa Major.
- Belasco - He ruled Limbo until Magik killed him.

=== Organizations ===
- Rasputin family - The ruling family of the Eurasian Republic, which operates under a Tsarist autocracy. (Note: As revealed in Ultimates Vol. 4 #2.) They are also responsible for the "Rasputin Purge" that exiled Kraven the Hunter's family among others. (Note: As revealed in Ultimate Spider-Man Vol. 3 #8.)
- Directorate X - An organization loyal to the Rasputin family.
- The Opposition - A group of humans and mutants who oppose the Rasputin family.
  - F.O.R.G.E. - A group in the Opposition.

== Collected editions ==
#	Title	Material collected	Format	Pages	Released	ISBN
1	The Winter Soldier	Ultimate Wolverine #1–6; material from Ultimate Universe: One Year In	TPB	144	16 Sep 2025	978-1302962050
2	Logan	Ultimate Wolverine #7-12	TPB	136	3 Mar 2026	978-1302962067
3	The Maker's Mark	Ultimate Wolverine #13-16; material from Ultimate Universe: Finale	TPB	112	1 Sep 2026	978-1302968120
