= The Ultimates (2024) =

Comic book series

- Cover of The Ultimates #1 with Doom, Giant-Man, Thor, Captain America, Sif, Iron Lad, and Wasp.

Publication information
- Publisher: Marvel Comics
- Schedule: Monthly
- Format: Ongoing
- Genre: Superhero
- Publication date: June 2024 – May 2026
- No. of issues: 24
- Main character: Ultimates

Creative team
- Written by: Deniz Camp
- Artist: Juan Frigeri
- Letterer: Travis Lanham
- Colorist: Federico Blee
- Editor(s): Wil Moss; Michelle Marchese

The Ultimates is a 24 issue comic book series about the Ultimates, part of the Ultimate Universe imprint, written by Deniz Camp and illustrated by Juan Frigeri. Published by Marvel Comics, it began publication in June 2024.

The series follows events in the aftermath of the "Ultimate Invasion" storyline. The series is part of the new Ultimate Universe timeline, which puts several Marvel characters in a radically altered sociopolitical status quo, including elements of alternate history, and follows Tony Stark / Iron Lad as he assembles a covert ops network, dubbed the "Ultimates", to fight back against the Maker's Council and take back their world.

The series has garnered acclaim for its radical reinvention of the Marvel mythos, political messaging, writing, and its development of the Ultimate Universe.

== Editorial history ==
The limited series Ultimate Invasion by Jonathan Hickman introduced the Ultimate universe, a fictional universe distinct from the standard Marvel Universe. Three ongoing comics were released afterwards, set in this continuity: Ultimate Spider-Man, Ultimate Black Panther and Ultimate X-Men. The Ultimates, the fourth ongoing comic, is written by Deniz Camp with illustrated by Juan Frigeri. The comic's plot continue the main storyline of Ultimate Invasion and the one-shot Ultimate Universe (2023). At the time of the series announcement, Camp said "The new Ultimates line is the most exciting superhero comics event in years, and it's humbling to be a part of it. We are reinventing these classic characters and archetypes to be as surprising and vital as when they were first introduced. Our Ultimates is an evolution not just of the Avengers, but of the whole superhero team concept; from the grand and operatic to the small and personal, Ultimates will feel like no Avengers or Ultimates comic ever before".

The story of The Ultimates takes place in real time. Each issue, one less month remains until the City opens and the Maker escapes.

== Plot ==
=== "Fix The World" (#1–6) ===
Although the Maker was imprisoned at the City thanks to Howard Stark, his imprisonment is only expected to last two years, and his Council remains in control of Earth. Howard's son Tony (Iron Lad) works with Doom to form the Ultimates Network, aiming to combat the Maker's Council and restock the world with heroes before the City re-opens. After recruiting Captain America, Thor Odinson and Sif, the Ultimates infiltrate Latveria and collect lost superpowers, later called "Origin Machines". Upon discovering this, the Council uses a Stark satellite to obliterate their hideout at Stark Tower, framing it as a suicidal terror attack by Iron Lad.

Barely escaping death by using the Immortus Engine to teleport 6 months into the future, the Ultimates are forced to contend with becoming widely reviled fugitives with little power. Iron Lad attempts to remedy this by transporting their collected Origin Machines to the past, creating a wide array of new heroes; this effort, dubbed "Ultimates 1.0", almost exclusively fails, convincing the team to abandon the use of the Immortus Engine altogether. In the meantime, the team continues to recruit other members in high-profile attacks throughout the North American Union (NAU); this includes Giant-Man, the Wasp, the original Human Torch and America Chavez. Their efforts eventually lead them to Monster Island, a Pacific atoll victimized by gamma bomb testing; there, the Ultimates meet She-Hulk, who agrees to assist the Ultimates in exchange for the decontanimation of the island. Her recruitment leads Hulk (a member of the Council) to more closely monitor the activities of the group. Doom intermittently works on attempts to recreate the Fantastic Four through exposing rats to cosmic radiation. Finally, Captain America meets and recruits Charli Ramsey, a Native American who took the bow and arrow meant for Clint Barton as their own, and has been attacking several Roxxon facilities. This recruitment draws the ire of Emmanuel da Costa, who further pressures Hulk to eliminate the group.

The full team assembles for the first time after Tony finds a Damage Control facility supposedly containing prisoners of the Council, which turns out to be a trap. Hulk uses a teleportation spell to bring the team to K'un-L'un in order to kill them. He and his gamma-injected Immortal Weapons attack and defeat the Ultimates, who are barely evacuated by Doom before execution. However, Doom is too late to prevent Tony from being grievously wounded in the attack, forcing him to be placed on life support.

=== "All Power To The People" (#7–12) ===
After their devastating battle in K'un-L'un, the team takes time off to recuperate and return to decentralized efforts throughout North America. Thor and Sif also leave to foster revolution in the rest of the Nine Realms. While on a mission, the Ultimates meet the Guardians of the Galaxy including members Captain Marvel, Star-Lord, Ultimate Nullifier, and Cosmo Starstalker. The Guardians inform the Ultimates that upon discovering that the Maker was overwriting their universe, the 61st century attempted to evacuate into an alternate plane. Their failure scattered the members, including Chavez, who they unsuccessfully attempt to convince to rejoin them; they also reveal that according to current history, the Ultimates are doomed to failure.

Elsewhere, the Ultimates continue expanding their ranks, but are further faced with the deep-rooted oppression undermining their efforts. Arrested arbitrarily and injected into a for-profit prison system from young, Luke Cage and later Danny Rand join their ranks as guerillas, organizing prison revolts throughout the NAU. Captain America and others infiltrate Castletown, one of a network of fortified settlements controlled by the Red Skulls, a fascist paramilitary organization. There, they discover the body of Namor displayed as a trophy by the current Red Skull, who they gradually realize is Bucky Barnes. Despite the hesitation of many of the peoples of the Nine Realms, Thor and Sif successfully create a revolutionary front against Loki's dicatorship, launching an armed uprising against him.

During this time, Tony, having been stabilized with the Immortus Engine, awoke and has been simultaneously directing Ultimates efforts while reviewing his memories. With the rest of the core members present, Tony confronts Doom as to his recurring nightmares of the team's demise in K'un-L'un; Doom reveals that the entire team was originally killed in K'un-L'un, and that he desperately utilized the Engine to change this outcome. Despite this brief animosity, the team agrees that the movement has stalled out due to overreliance on the central leadership of Iron Lad, Captain America and Doom. They decide that the only way forward is further decentralization and targeting the socioeconomic roots of global oppression, which they dub "Ultimates 3.0". Wasp is also revealed to be a double agent, feeding information to a Life Model Decoy (L.M.D.) of Nick Fury, leading H.A.N.D.

=== "Rescue Mission" (#13-18) ===
Radically changing their strategy, the Ultimates begin directly organizing numerous cells throughout North America and assaulting Red Skull strongholds. The Ultimates Network (UltNet) disseminate prohibited, copyrighted and patented information globally, undermining the Council's cultural and technological monopoly; the various prisons liberated by Cage and others are united into the Ultimate Archipelago, resisting incursion and training members to fight against the Council. The Human Torch is sent on a secret mission by Tony. Their escalation raises the attention of NAU corporate leaders under the auspices of the Hellfire Club, who meet with Emma Frost to discuss how they respond. After they witness her students Pietro and Wanda Maximoff be captured by the Ultimates, Frost executes all but one of their membership and takes direct control, save Da Costa.

The Ultimates later rescue and recruit the reincarnation of Shen Qi, a legendary revolutionary who was killed by the Xian of Heaven to prevent him from usurping their influence. Meanwhile, H.A.N.D. begins brutal crackdowns on the UltNet, driving members underground, though they are unable to successfully eliminate them or quell their influence. Doom, working through his trauma regarding his misfortune and captivity, works with Chavez to develop cosmic ray-powered superteams called the Fantastic Force.

From the Triskelion, Iron Lad publicly denounces the Council and calls the world to rebellion, inciting a revolution worldwide. Simultaneously, Cage leads his New Avengers to attack the former Fort Stark and other NAU installations, Shen Qi adopts Danny Rand as his new protege, and Chavez visits her former captor Midas, whom she mercy kills. With the scale of the rebellion overwhelming, the Nick Fury L.M.D. avoids deploying H.A.N.D. worldwide, preferring to use Wasp until he can strike at a later date.

=== "Ultimates Uprising" (#19-24) ===
Amidst the uprising against the forces of the Council, the Triskelion is destroyed by H.A.N.D., cutting off the Ultimates from the UltNet. The Fury L.M.D. then strategically deploys H.A.N.D. assets to eliminate key Ultimates members such as She-Hulk and Giant-Man. When the latter two are captured, the L.M.D. gloats about Wasp's subversion, before being abruptly killed by Vision. Vision reconnects the UltNet and organizes the defence of the liberated city of Detroit, whereupon it is revealed that Vision is the Human Torch, having used the Immortus Engine to travel back before the Maker's arrival to secretly prepare additional resources for the Ultimates. After this, Wasp frees H.A.N.D.'s superhuman prisoners and Vision deals a catastrophic blow to H.A.N.D.; he causes all Nick Fury L.M.D.s to go into a frenzied spiral and destroys most of the H.A.N.D. helicarrier fleet.

As the Ultimates sweep into the Southern NAU, Emmanuel da Costa meets with Frost as he launches a corporate rendition of the Ultimates to counteract their influence, livestreaming their deployment against Cage's Avengers team. The effort is thwarted when the Avengers kill the entire team quickly, reinforcing Frost's determination that Da Costa is useless; she allows his son Roberto to kill him, before pulling all Hellfire Club assets from the NAU. Elsewhere, working with the defected Maximoff twins, Captain America infiltrates one of the last Red Skull outposts with assistance from a splinter faction led by John Walker. He confronts Barnes, who explains that he was planted in the faction by a Fury L.M.D. and eventually fully joined them; heartbroken, the Captain euthanizes Barnes.

In Asgard, Thor and Sif continue to escalate the war against Loki. When Mangog is bribed to fight on Loki's behalf, it finally forces remaining holdouts to join the war, though not before Sif is killed while felling him. Finally, as the war proceeds to its final, decisive battle, most of the Realms and their Gods are killed, with Thor explaining to Loki that he embraced Ragnarök's arrival to restore the natural, fluid order of the cycle of the gods. In K'un-L'un, the Celestial Guard and most of Heaven joins Shen Qi's revolutionary movement. With most of his Children of Light occupied, immobilized or killed, Hulk is expelled from Heaven to monster island by Shen Qi and Danny. There, She-Hulk beats the gloating Hulk to death and recovers her family; they briefly celebrate, before Iron Lad desperately calls to all Ultimates to get to the City, frantically reporting that the Maker has returned. (Note: The story is concluded in Ultimate Endgame #5.)

== Characters ==
=== Ultimates ===
Character	Name	Joined in
Doom	Reed Richards	Ultimate Universe #1 (November 2023)
Iron Lad	Tony Stark	Ultimate Universe #1 (November 2023)
Thor Odinson		Ultimate Universe #1 (November 2023)
Sif		Ultimate Universe #1 (November 2023)
Captain America	Steve Rogers	Ultimates #1 (June 2024)
Wasp	Janet van Dyne	Ultimates #1 (June 2024)
Giant-Man	Hank Pym	Ultimates #1 (June 2024)
Human Torch / Vision	Jim Hammond	Human Torch: Free Comic Book Day 2024: Ultimate Universe/Spider-Man (May 2024); Vision: Ultimates Vol. 3 #20 (January 2026)
America Chavez		Ultimates #2 (July 2024)
She-Hulk	Lejori Joena Zakaria	Ultimates #3 (August 2024)
Hawkeye	Charli Ramsey	Ultimates #5 (October 2024)
Power Man	Luke Cage	Ultimates #9 (February 2025)
Iron Fist	Shen Qi	Ultimates #15 (August 2025)
Spider-Man	Peter Parker	Ultimate Endgame #1 (December 2025)
Quicksilver	Pietro Maximoff	Ultimates #22 (March 2026)
Scarlet Witch	Wanda Maximoff	Ultimates #22 (March 2026)

=== Enemies ===
- Henri Dugarry / Captain Britain: Henri Dugarry was a French nobleman, descending from Louis XIV, and the wielder of both the Sword of Might and the Amulet of Right. In addition to granting him the mantle of this reality's Captain Britain, the Maker gave him providence over the entirety of the European Coalition, one of the seven sovereign bodies whose combined power governs the entire world, and the realm of Avalon. He battled The Ultimates two times, one time in Latveria where Iron Lad blinded his right eye, and the second time when Dugarry was with his cavalry, the Black Crusade, only to be defeated by the heroes again.
- Midas: Midas was a self-made entrepreneur who founded Midas Group, an industry led by him, with connections to the clandestine Maker's Council. In addition, he was a member in good standing of the Hellfire Club, an organization that originally included several of the Founding Fathers of the former United States. He assumed control of the White House and the North America Union in 1963. After being hit in the neck and paralyzed, Midas was left recuperating in a bunker with his armor keeping him alive. America Chavez later breaches it and kills him.
- Emmanuel da Costa: A member of Maker's Council and ruler of Society of South America. He is also the Black King of the Hellfire Club and an investor of Roxxon. Emmanuel's powers come from the blood donations he get from the mutant students of the Frost School for Wayward Youngsters. Emmanuel's brain was later partially shut down by Emma Frost and he is killed by his own son.
  - Roberto da Costa: The son of Emmanuel da Costa with solar absorption and channeling abilities. After shutting down parts of Emmanuel's brain, Emma Frost allows Roberto to kill Emmanuel.
- Bruce Banner / Hulk: Dr. Bruce Banner, Gamma Radiation specialist once employed by a special military operation, on grounds of overseeing the detonation of his personal co-creation, the Banner-Ulan Gamma Bomb, in the Pacific Islands. Banner ended up becoming an unintentional subject of his own experiment by being exposed to the underestimated radius of the bomb once it went off, becoming The Hulk in the process; with his newfound titanic strength The Maker made Banner one of his council members, lending Banner ownership of the East-Asian countries as the green giant continues his Gamma experiments across the lands he rules over, and the pacifist cult named the Children of Eternal Light.
- Decay's Beautiful Daughter: A student of Hulk and member of the Immortal Weapons who has brought to Earth a piece of Heaven. She would later be placed in the Defenders and end up trapped in the Darkforce dimension by Singularity.
- Uranium Brother #235: A member of the Immortal Weapons. He is killed by She-Hulk.
- Prince of Meltdowns: A member of the Immortal Weapons.
- Bride of Nine World-Breakers: A member of the Immortal Weapons.
- Crane Mother of the Bomb: A member of the Immortal Weapons.
- Fat Cobra: A member of the Immortal Weapons.
- Nick Fury (L.M.D.): Life Model Decoy units of Nick Fury were created by the Maker to serve as the Director of H.A.N.D. Only one was active at a time and they were given the memories of the original Fury plus all the previous L.M.D.s, except the moments before their deaths; thus, each Fury L.M.D. believed he was the original. The countless heinous acts committed as the head of H.A.N.D., including the Inhuman genocide, the murder of the Power Pack, and lobotomization of Hank Pym, eventually led to each Fury L.M.D. betraying and unsuccessfully attempting to eliminate the Maker's Council, completely ignorant of his previous attempts.
- James Barnes / Grand Skull: Leader of the Red Skull Gang, James Barnes is a former member of the Invaders (along with Captain America, Human Torch, and Namor). Though he was listed as "deceased" on Maker's character log, Barnes was seen alive and later joined the Red Skull Gang.
- John Walker / Red Skull: One of the strongest members of the Red Skull Gang, John Walker was destined to be the superhero known as US Agent until the Maker intervened. Instead, he joined the Red Skull Gang. When Iron Lad sent down the origin-machines, he was able to take a super-soldier serum to buff himself. However, it did not help him when he was burned by the Human Torch. Walker later took on the name of Red Skull.
- All-Father Loki: When Maker settled on Earth-6160 to reshape it to his image, he facilitated the ascension of Loki to the throne of Asgard, resulting in the destruction of the Bifrost, the death of Odin, and the imprisonment of Thor. Over time, Loki has grown lazy and dull, gaining weight as he spends all day eating. He eventually rises his armies of Frost Giants and the Undead to meet Thor's challenge to his reign. However, it is too late as Thor has awoken Surtur.
- Queen Hela: When Loki conquered Asgard and the Nine Realms, he gave Hela control over Valhalla, the home of warriors who have fallen in battle. She takes Balder as a servant and allows her skeleton armies to trash the Great Hall while feasting.
- Emma Frost / White Queen - The White Queen of the Hellfire Club and the headmistress of the Frost School for Wayward Youngsters.
- Ballistic: A member of the Defenders who is described as a handsome hothead. Ballistic is killed by Wingspan, who manages to break through his blast field.
- Thora: A member of the Defenders who wields a hammer and is alleged to have been empowered by the Norse gods. Thora is killed by Luke Cage.
- Marvel Boy: A size-shifting monster hunter from Hi no Kune and member of the Defenders. Ripped apart by Penance's Cerberus.
- Proctor: The chivalric leader of Henri Dugarry's Black Knight Brigade and member of the Defenders who is described to be one of the greatest soldiers on the plant. He was beheaded by Nameless.

=== Other characters ===
- Tara: A member of Lejori's tribe whose nervous system was exposed after her mutation, leaving her in constant pain.
- Sorry: A large-headed member of Lejori's tribe who is strapped to a wheelchair and is constantly lost in his thoughts.
- Abram: A baby and member of Lejori's tribe who turns into a large humanoid gamma monster when upset.
- Danny Rand: An inmate at the Gordium Correction Facility who befriends Luke Cage.
- Rex Bonhurst: The CEO of Roxxon.
- Nicodemus West: The CMO of Alchemax.
- Justine Hammer: The CEO of Hammer Weapons.
- #1983 - The Scientist Supreme of Advanced Idea Mechanics.
- Oubliette Midas: The CCO of Midas Inc.
- Wren Montgomery: A young girl who got involved with the UltNet.
- Jennifer Walters: She was a sixth-grade teacher who was taken into H.A.N.D. custody.
- Plasma: A political prisoner-turned-member of the Fantastic Force who died during the group's fight with some giants.
- Gravity: A political prisoner-turned-member of the Fantastic Force.
- Magne: A political prisoner-turned-member of the Fantastic Force.
- King Arthur: A member of the Army Unending.
- James Rhodes: He was one of the pilots of the Anti-War Machine.
- Doop: He was one of the prisoners of H.A.N.D. until Wasp frees him.
- Forbush Man: He was one of the prisoners of H.A.N.D. until Wasp frees him.
- Gatecrasher: She was one of the prisoners of H.A.N.D. until Wasp frees her.
- Hit-Monkey: He was one of the prisoners of H.A.N.D. until Wasp frees him.
- Howard the Duck: He was one of the prisoners of H.A.N.D. until Wasp frees him.
- Orb: He was one of the prisoners of H.A.N.D. until Wasp frees him.
- Squirrel Girl: She was one of the prisoners of H.A.N.D. until Wasp frees her.
- Wingspan: A former prisoner and member of the Ultimate Avengers who was spliced with the DNA of a falcon.
- Singularity: A poet, former prisoner, and member of the Ultimate Avengers whose powers are derived from the Darkforce.
- Nameless: A mute former prisoner and member of the Ultimate Avengers who possesses a powerful healing factor. He is based on Deadpool.
- Penance: A former prisoner and member of the Ultimate Avengers who was transformed into a Ghost Rider-like form after selling his soul to the Devil. He uses a Cerberus as a mode of transportation.

=== Organizations ===
- Maker's Council: A cabal composed of the various world leaders of the seven super-nations that constituted the world and exerted significant influence over society.
- North American Union: The formal Government of North America, comprising the former United States, Mexico and Canada. Largely unseen in any specific form, the Union is implied or stated to have delegated most state functions to major American corporations, including public services, the legal system and prisons. Previously led by Howard Stark and Obadiah Stane, the organization and its territories were de facto divided between other members of the Maker's Council. Governance of these divided territories have since fallen to a number of regional corporations and powerbrokers who govern in their service.
- H.A.N.D.: The Heroic Anomaly Neutralization Directorate, or H.A.N.D. for short, is an organization that acts as a secret police to the Maker and his council. H.A.N.D.'s main objective is to enforce the Maker's will and prevent an Age of Heroes by systematically eradicating any potential super-powered phenomena. It originated as a religious cabal and ninja clan known as the Hand, who worshiped the demon Krahllak until Krahllak was killed by Nick Fury.
- Black Crusade: The Black Crusade (Croisade Noire in French) is the personal guard of Henri Dugarry, bearer of the mantle of Captain Britain and ruler of the European Coalition along with the eastern coast of the North American Union.
- Lejori's Tribe: A group of gamma mutates on Monster Isle that are part of Lejori's tribe.
- Immortal Weapons: The main weapons of the Children of Eternal Light, and understudies to the Hulk.
- Midas Group: Midas Group is a North American corporation run by Midas with his daughter Oubliette as the CCO. The conglomerate owns a number of prisons, including one called Seagate Penitentiary where its guards physically and emotionally abuse their prisoners.
- Red Skull Gang: The Red Skull Gang is a neo-Nazi organization inspired by the former Red Skull Johann Schmidt. They employ the symbols and tactics of the 1970s vigilante, Frank Castle. They run various militia camps around the former US, such as Castletown, and are headed by a Grand Skull, of which there have been five.
- Loki's Army: Made up of Frost Giants and the Undead, Loki commands these forces to protect his reign in Asgard. He uses them against the Asgardian Rebellion, and to imprison the Vanir.
- Hellfire Club - An organization run by Emmanuel da Costa.
  - Frost School for Wayward Youngsters - A school run by Emma Frost.
- Fantastic Force - A group of cosmic ray-empowered prisoners who gained their powers though a machine that Doom and America Chavez have operated.
- Army Unending - An army of occupied enslaved heroes, elves, ents, faeries, giants, goblins, ogres, orcs, trolls, and other forces that work for Henri Dugarry.
- Avengers Unit 01 - A group of empowered prisoners led by Luke Cage.
- Defenders - A group that is loyal to Emmanuel da Costa.

== Collected editions ==
Following its release at the start of February 2025, Ultimates by Deniz Camp Vol. 1: Fix The World entered ICv2's monthly graphic novel chart at number one.

#	Title	Material collected	Format	Pages	Released	ISBN
1	Fix The World	Ultimate Universe (2023); The Ultimates (2024) #1–6; material from Free Comic Book Day 2024: Ultimate Universe/Spider-Man	TPB	192	4 Feb 2025	978-1302957513
2	All Power To The People	The Ultimates (2024) #7–12; Ultimate Universe: One Year In	TPB	168	16 Sep 2025	978-1302958183
3	Rescue Mission	The Ultimates (2024) #13-18; Ultimate Hawkeye	TPB	168	17 Feb 2026	978-1302958190
4	Ultimate Uprising	The Ultimates (2024) #19-24; Ultimate Universe: Two Years In (2025)	TPB	184	4 Aug 2026	978-1302958206

== Critical reception ==
Ratings
Issue	AIPT	Comic Watch
#1	10/10	10/10
#2	9/10	10/10
#3	9.5/10	—N/a
#4	9/10	10/10
#5	8.5/10	—N/a
#6	9/10	—N/a
#7	8.5/10	—N/a
#8	8.5/10	—N/a
#9	8.5/10	—N/a
#10	8.5/10	—N/a
#11	8.5/10
#12	8/10

Chase Magnett from ComicBook.com acknowledges how the comics narrative approach differs from the original series, with a deeper focus on its story, ensemble of characters, and set-up for future stories.

David Brooke from AIPT says that the creators fundamentally understands superhero comics while reworking the characters in new ways, stating that the series is one of the most exciting superhero comics of the year.

The Ultimates won IGN's Best Comic Book Series or Original Graphic Novel of 2024 Award.
