= Erik Killmonger =

Marvel Comics character

- Erik Killmonger fighting Black Panther in the textless cover of Black Panther #37 (August 2008). Art by Alan Davis and Mark Farmer.

Publication information
- Publisher: Marvel Comics
- First appearance: Jungle Action #6 (September 1973)
- Created by: Don McGregor; Rich Buckler

In-story information
- Full name: N'Jadaka
- Species: Human
- Notable aliases: Erik Killmonger
- Abilities: Expert tactician; Skilled hunter and tracker; Skilled hand-to-hand combatant; Enhanced strength, speed, agility, and durability; Uses high-tech equipment and weapons, including vibranium outfit

Erik Killmonger (né N'Jadaka) is a supervillain appearing in American comic books published by Marvel Comics. Created by Don McGregor and Rich Buckler, he first appeared in Jungle Action #6 (September 1973). The character is commonly depicted as a skilled hunter and mercenary born in the fictional African nation of Wakanda, who holds a grudge against the country and its people after his biological parents were killed when he was young. Raised outside of Wakanda, he eventually returns as a revolutionary leader and terrorist to exact his revenge, and repeatedly challenges the nation's king and protector, Black Panther, who becomes his most prominent adversary.

The character has been adapted from the comics into several other forms of media, such as television series and video games. Michael B. Jordan portrayed the character in the Marvel Cinematic Universe films Black Panther (2018) and Black Panther: Wakanda Forever (2022), and voiced an alternate reality version in the animated series What If...? (2021).

== Publication history ==
Erik Killmonger first appeared in the "Panther's Rage" storyline, initially in Jungle Action #6-8 (September 1973 - January 1974), and was created by writer Don McGregor and penciler Rich Buckler. He is killed in Jungle Action #17 (Sept. 1975). The Mandarin claims his body, and he reappears in Iron Man Annual #5 (1982).

He returns in Black Panther vol. 3 #15-18 (February-May 2000), written by Christopher Priest. In the story, Killmonger destabilizes the economy of Wakanda in a renewed effort to conquer it. Killmonger defeats T'Challa and becomes a new Black Panther, but he is poisoned by the heart-shaped herb during his ascension ceremony. Killmonger is rendered comatose and T'Challa returns to his position. Killmonger again tries to conquer Wakanda in Black Panther vol. 4 (beginning 2005), written by Reginald Hudlin. In 2019, Bryan Edward Hill began working with Marvel on a Killmonger miniseries. An alternate version of Killmonger appears in Black Panther vol. 7 #20 (March 2020), written by Ta-Nehisi Coates. Another alternate version of the character appears in Ultimate Black Panther (2024), also written by Hill.

== Fictional character biography ==
Killmonger is born in Wakanda under the name N'Jadaka. His parents are killed by raiders led by M'Demwe, a traitorous citizen of the Golden Realm who sells out secrets of his home nation to Ulysses Klaue, and subsequently takes him in.

N'Jadaka is a gifted intellectual from an early age. This trait is exploited by M'Demwe, who takes him into the outside world, all while boasting of national superiority as they trek foreign lands.

All the while, N'Jadaka fosters resentment towards everyone and everything for all the horrible events that befell him, while his future nemesis T'Challa is crowned king after the death of his father.

Eventually, the youth tires of his life in servitude and his childhood of hardship, and executes M'Demwe before striving to find his own path. He later changes his name to Erik Killmonger, and studied at the Massachusetts Institute of Technology, still desperate to avenge his father's death.

While studying in Harlem, New York, Erik attempts multiple times to murder the source of his woes, but is confounded by supervillainous power players working under the likes of Wilson Fisk/Kingpin.

That mercenary outfit of mutants takes Killmonger on as a temporary member within their crew of hired guns. Eventually he falls in love with a teammate, Knight, and finds temporary solace in her company, while taking odd jobs under the lord of crime in New York. All of that eventually falls apart when their employer sells them out to his top operator Bullseye. Knight subsequently cuts a deal with S.H.I.E.L.D. behind the backs of what remains of the team to get an easy out from her life of crime.

Killmonger eventually embraces his chosen name, as well as a new goddess named K'liluna, fallen sister of Mother Bast, when he exacts revenge upon his scorned lover before disappearing into obscurity for a time.

=== Return Home ===
Killmonger returns to Wakanda after king T'Challa brings their homeland to the attentions of the outside world. The two converse about Wakandan theology while asking about the deity whom Erik is secretly living with, all whilst plotting his revenge against his liege, and the nation he blames for his abandonment to the corruption beyond it. While re-acquainting himself with Wakanda, N'Jadaka discovers plans for a WMD called Project: Koukou, a deadly vibranium shock bomb meant to act as a colonizer deterrent. He then sets about systematically killing other Wakandan refugees as a misdirection ploy so as to foment his plans for global conflict.

Killmonger's ultimate aim is to drop Koukou on a S.H.I.E.L.D. Helicarrier coming in for diplomatic treaties, framing Wakanda as aggressors on the world stage, and forcing them to go to war with everyone else, thus; allowing Killmonger to overthrow T'Challa and lead his people to storm over the world in a genocidal crusade. When Shuri traps him in an invention, instead of being arrested, he jumps from a plane into a lake, where he is believed to have survived.

What becomes of Killmonger afterward is a mystery. He eventually settles in a kingdom-based hamlet that later changes its name to N'Jadaka Village in his honor. He becomes a subversive, with dreams of ridding Wakanda of what he terms "white colonialist" cultural influences, and return it entirely to its ancient ways. He then takes advantage of Black Panther's frequent absences in America with the Avengers to stage a coup d'état, along with Baron Macabre. He is defeated and killed, until the Mandarin claims his body.

=== Resurrection ===
Using the Ten Rings, the Mandarin amplifies the resurrection altar and restores Killmonger to life. Killmonger returns to his lover and ally, Madam Slay, and the two plot to kill Black Panther and restore the ancient ways of Wakanda. While Tony Stark visits Wakanda, Madam Slay drugs James Rhodes and takes him prisoner. Killmonger appears to have killed Black Panther, and blames Rhodes and Stark, convincing the Wakandans that he can lead them to vengeance. Black Panther returns, revealing that he faked his death using a Life Model Decoy, and defeats Killmonger. The Mandarin recalls his ring and Killmonger reverts to an inanimate skeleton. Killmonger's followers resurrect him again and he clashes with T'Challa on several other occasions.

=== Wakanda takeover ===
In the wake of the sorcerer Achebe's attempted takeover of Wakanda, with T'Challa absent and control of the country left with his regent Everett K. Ross, Killmonger tries to gain control of the country via its economy, forcing T'Challa to stop him by nationalizing all foreign companies in Wakanda and cause a run on the stock market. The two foes fight in a ritual combat over the right to rule Wakanda, and Killmonger defeats T'Challa and gains the status of Black Panther. He maintains control of Wakanda for a while and even attempts to inherit T'Challa's Avengers status, but when he undergoes the ascension rite needed to cement his position, his body has a severe reaction to the heart-shaped herb that he is required to consume - it is poisonous to all but the royal bloodline. Although it is convenient to allow him to die and be unquestionably entitled to the position of Black Panther, T'Challa preserves Killmonger's life.

Killmonger eventually comes out of his coma, thus; reclaiming his position as chieftain over Wakanda. He goes to New York and contacts Kasper Cole, an inner-city police officer masquerading as Black Panther to help him with cases, and attempts to gain him as an ally (and one-up T'Challa) by offering him a buffered version of Black Panther's herb and help finding his supervisor's kidnapped son. In exchange, he has to drop the identity of Black Panther and take up that of a White Tiger acolyte of the Panther cult, and would owe Killmonger a favor. Kasper agrees to this, but then uses his new herb-enhanced powers to track down the boy on his own and avoid owing Killmonger an unpayable debt.

T'Challa is once again the sole ruler of Wakanda when Killmonger resurfaces and takes control of the neighboring country of Niganda. During a subsequent duel with T'Challa, Killmonger is killed by Monica Rambeau, whom he previously captured and imprisoned. Killmonger's young son swears vengeance against Black Panther, much like N'Jadaka did years earlier after the death of his own father.

=== Post–Secret Wars ===
After Marvel's multiversal reboot in Secret Wars, Killmonger once again is resurrected by an intergalactic superpower based upon Wakanda's cultural heritage; one that lacks its more pacifistic approach to handling different races and ethnicities. A leading ruler of said empire which conquered five galaxies while taking up his name seeks to supplant the original N'Jadaka's body so as to overtake the Wakanda of now in revenge on the king of the future for killing him. But the symbiote withholding the emperor's soul overshot his attempt at finding a new host, resurrecting the original holder of his name, who then fights with the emperor over control of their shared body. The parasitic entity threatens to cast Killmonger back unto death should he disobey him, while the precursor to the galactic overlord promising to master and supplant it in response.

== Powers and abilities ==
Erik Killmonger is an expert martial artist with peak-level strength and a genius-level intellect. He is also an expert tactician, having taken over Wakanda and Niganda multiple times. Erik is capable of taking attacks from stronger foes and falls from great heights that would kill or injure a normal person with little to no injury (he still can be hurt or killed if enough damage is sustained). He is highly knowledgeable of Wakandan history and laws, leading to him battling Black Panther repeatedly for the throne. It is also strongly implied that he cannot consume the Heart-Shaped Herb to gain the same abilities of the Black Panther due to his not having the royal bloodline. He is also a skilled businessman.

== Reception ==
- In 2018, ComicBook.com ranked Erik Killmonger 1st in their "8 Best Black Panther Villains" list.
- In 2020, Comic Book Resources (CBR) ranked Killmonger 1st in their "Marvel: Ranking Black Panther's Rogues Gallery" list.
- In 2022, Screen Rant included Killmonger in their "15 Most Powerful Black Panther Villains" list.
- In 2022, CBR ranked Killmonger 4th in their "10 Most Iconic Black Panther Villains" list.

== Other versions ==
=== Intergalactic Empire of Wakanda ===
An alternate timeline version of Killmonger appears in Black Panther (vol. 7). This version bonded with a Symbiote after the king of Wakanda sent him on a mission to the Mamadou galaxy and subsequently overthrew him. He is later killed when Bast betrays him and destroys his base.

=== Ultimate Universe ===
An alternate universe version of Killmonger from Earth-6160 appears in the Ultimate Universe imprint. This version is a member of a rebellion against Ra and Khonshu.

== In other media ==
=== Television ===
- Erik Killmonger appears in Lego Marvel Super Heroes: Black Panther - Trouble in Wakanda, voiced by Keston John.
- Erik Killmonger appears in Avengers Assemble, voiced again by Keston John. This version is the leader of the Shadow Council and T'Challa's teacher.

=== Marvel Cinematic Universe ===
Killmonger appears in media set in the Marvel Cinematic Universe (MCU), portrayed by Michael B. Jordan. This version is a United States Navy SEAL named Erik Stevens whose "Killmonger" nickname came from his military career. Additionally, he is the son of Prince N'Jobu and an American woman from Oakland, California. He was born in the United States and his chest is covered with self-inflicted scarification dots that represent each of his confirmed kills. Furthermore, Killmonger sports battle armor resembling that of Vegeta from the anime series Dragon Ball Z, of which Jordan is a fan. Jordan's performance as Killmonger received critical acclaim, and the character was widely hailed as one of the best villains in the MCU.

- Killmonger first appears in Black Panther. Seeking revenge for his father's death and angered by Wakanda's refusal to use its wealth to assist others, he challenges his cousin T'Challa for his birthright to the throne and seemingly kills him. After becoming king of Wakanda and consuming the Heart-Shaped Herb to gain powers, Killmonger orders the rest of the herbs to be destroyed, the country's weaponry be sent to marginalized groups in London, New York City, and Hong Kong to help their oppressed citizens overthrow their governments, and dons a version of T'Challa's suit. However, T'Challa returns to reclaim the throne and mortally wounds Killmonger in their resulting rematch. Though he is offered treatment, Killmonger chooses to die rather than be imprisoned.
- An alternate timeline variant of Killmonger appears in What If...?, voiced by Jordan. In the episode "What If... Killmonger Rescued Tony Stark?", he rescues and befriends Tony Stark to gain his help in building an automated combat drone out of Vibranium before arranging the deaths of T'Challa, James Rhodes, and Stark to spark conflict between the United States and Wakanda. After returning to Wakanda and revealing his true heritage, Killmonger works with Wakanda's forces to defeat the drone army and eventually become the new Black Panther. In "What If... the Watcher Broke His Oath?", the Watcher recruits Killmonger to join the Guardians of the Multiverse and help stop a variant of Ultron empowered by Infinity Stones from destroying the multiverse. Following Ultron's defeat, Killmonger betrays the Guardians and takes the Stones for himself, hoping to use them to fix his universe. While he is attacked by Arnim Zola, who also seeks the Stones, both are frozen in a pocket dimension by the Watcher and Doctor Strange Supreme, with the latter taking the two to his universe to watch over them. In the episode "What If... Strange Supreme Intervened?", amidst Captain Carter's efforts to stop Strange Supreme from restoring his universe, she frees his captives, including Killmonger. He fights Carter and her ally Kahhori before they take his Infinity Stones.
- Killmonger makes a cameo appearance as a spirit in Black Panther: Wakanda Forever. Shuri creates and consumes a synthetic heart-shaped herb and goes into a trance in the hopes of communing with her lost loved ones. Instead, she sees Killmonger, who explains that they are meeting because of her desire for vengeance against Namor following Ramonda's death and questions her whether she will give in to it or be as noble as T'Challa.

=== Video games ===
- Erik Killmonger appears as an unlockable playable character in Lego Marvel's Avengers as part of the "Classic Black Panther" DLC Pack.
- Erik Killmonger appears as an unlockable playable DLC character in Lego Marvel Super Heroes 2, voiced by Damian Lynch.
- Erik Killmonger appears as an unlockable playable character in Marvel Future Fight.
- Erik Killmonger appears as an unlockable playable character in Marvel Contest of Champions.

=== Music ===
Erik Killmonger is referenced in the song "King's Dead", produced by rappers Jay Rock, Kendrick Lamar, and Future as part of Black Panther's soundtrack.
