= Fantastic Force =

Comic book superhero team

Publication information
- Publisher: Marvel Comics
- First appearance: Fantastic Force #1 (1994)
- Created by: Tom Brevoort

In-story information
- Base(s): Baxter Building
- Member(s): Psi-Lord; Vibraxas; Huntara; Devlor; She-Hulk; Black Panther; Human Torch

Fantastic Force is a superhero team appearing in American comic books published by Marvel Comics. It is a spin-off of the Fantastic Four. The team had its own title, which lasted for eighteen issues from November 1994 to April 1996. Its average monthly sales for 1995, its only full year of publication, were 33,675 copies. The title was revived for a miniseries involving a new team in April 2009.

== Publication history ==
In the early 1990s, it was rumored that Fantastic Four was to be cancelled and a new title called Fantastic Force launched in its place. The rumors were false, but the editor-in-chief of Marvel Comics, Tom DeFalco, decided that due to the amount of traction the rumor had gained that they should create a new comic book with that title.

A creative team was brought together; however, after it disbanded due to creative differences. Tom Brevoort wrote the new book, while Dante Bastianoni took on the responsibilities of cover design and penciller. It launched in November 1994 as a spinoff book to Fantastic Four rather than as a replacement.

== Fictional team biography ==
After Nathaniel Richards takes Franklin Richards into the future, he is replaced in the present by a teenage version of himself who had better control over his powers. He had been trained by his supposed aunt Huntara and Elsewhen's ruler Warlord Kargul. When Huntara comes to the present to prevent the changes caused by Nathaniel's goals, she encounters the teenage Franklin and they work together due to their mutual goals.

== Membership ==
The founding members of the original team were:

- Psi-Lord (Franklin Richards of Earth-6311) is the leader, son of Mister Fantastic and Invisible Woman of the Fantastic Four.
- Huntara (Tara Richards), Franklin Richards' aunt from an alternate future, armed with a scythe that enabled her to open interdimensional portals.
- Vibraxas, a Wakandan with the power to generate vibratory force.
- Devlor, an Inhuman who could transform into a large ape-like creature.

Black Panther, who also served as an unofficial member of the team, joining them in the field on occasion, funded Fantastic Force. For a short time, the Human Torch became team leader. Eventually, Huntara left the group for another dimension, and her slot on the team was filled by She-Hulk.

Vibraxas later became a supporting character in the second volume of Black Panther.

== Other versions ==
=== Earth-807128's future ===
The new miniseries in 2009 follows a group formerly known as the New Defenders. This team consists of the last superheroes of Earth-807128, who originate from the year 2509 and later settle on Nu Earth, an artificial copy of Earth. This team includes a descendant of Bruce Banner/Hulk named Hulk Jr. and a future version of Wolverine under the alias of "Hooded Man" as well as a number of less recognizable characters.

=== Ultimate Universe ===
In the Ultimate Universe, the Fantastic Four never existed due to the Maker's interference. After experimenting with rats in an attempt to recreate the Fantastic Four, Doom performs cosmic radiation experiments on Maker's political prisoners as part of Project 4. His efforts culminate in the formation of Fantastic Force.
