= Baron Macabre =

Publication information
- Publisher: Marvel Comics
- First appearance: Jungle Action #9 (May 1974)
- Created by: Don McGregor; Gil Kane

In-story information
- Alter ego: Unknown
- Species: Human mutate
- Partnerships: Erik Killmonger
- Notable aliases: Baron Macabre
- Abilities: Ability to mutate humans into zombie-like creatures; Ability to resurrect the dead.; Fire electric blasts

Baron Macabre is a character appearing in American comic books published by Marvel Comics. Created by Don McGregor and Gil Kane, the character first appeared in Jungle Action #9 (May 1974).

== Publication history ==
Baron Macabre debuted in Jungle Action #9 (May 1974), and was created by Don McGregor and Gil Kane. He later appeared in Jungle Action #10—11 (July, September 1974), and #17 (September 1975). He appeared in the 2018 Black Panther: Long Live The King series.

== Fictional character biography ==
Baron Macabre is a Wakandan subversive capable of reanimating the dead as zuvembies. He was an ally of Erik Killmonger and came into conflict with the Black Panther.

== Powers and abilities ==
Baron Macabre was empowered by the Resurrection Altar. He can fire electric blasts, mutate human beings into zombie-like creatures, and resurrect the dead.
