= Ultimate Black Panther =

Comic book series

- Cover of Ultimate Black Panther #4 with T'Challa, Shuri, and the Dora Milaje

Publication information
- Publisher: Marvel Comics
- Format: Ongoing series
- Genre: Superhero
- Publication date: February 2024 – January 2026
- No. of issues: 24
- Main character: Black Panther

Creative team
- Created by: Black Panther by Jack Kirby and Stan Lee
- Written by: Bryan Hill
- Artist(s): Stefano Caselli; Carlos Nieto
- Letterer: VC's Cory Petit
- Colorist: David Curiel
- Editor(s): Wil Moss; Michelle Marchese

Ultimate Black Panther is a 2024 comic book series written by Bryan Edward Hill and illustrated by Stefano Caselli. Published by Marvel Comics, it is set in the Ultimate Universe (Earth-6160). It follows T'Challa as he rules over the isolated Wakanda, while garnering allies and preparing for war with Moon Knight, who aims to take control of the rest of Africa in the Maker's absence.

== Publication history ==
Ultimate Black Panther, a reimagination of the Black Panther character, is the second comic of the Ultimate Universe line. It was published a month after the debut of Ultimate Spider-Man and one month before the debut of Ultimate X-Men. Those three series were the first ongoing series of the Ultimate Universe after the miniseries Ultimate Invasion that started it. Of those three, Ultimate Black Panther is the only one that is not a reboot of a previous series from the original Ultimate Marvel imprint.

Hill explained that, although the comic is set in the Ultimate Universe and that would give him great freedom to reinvent the character, it still has to respect the IP. He reasons that an IP has major and minor rules, and that the creative freedom only allows breaking some of the minor ones. He also wanted to explore the concept of an isolationist country such as Wakanda. He explained that in the first issues there would be a war right outside of Wakanda, and the characters would be torn between the options of maintaining the isolationist policy or joining the fight.

== Plot ==
=== Peace and War (#1–6) ===
Wakanda is a hidden isolationist nation in Africa, ruled by Black Panther (T'Challa) and Okoye. As Maker is removed from global politics, his underlings in his council Lord Ra and Lord Khonshu take it as a chance to annex territories from Africa. The Wakandan royalty are divided over helping the nearby countries or just securing their own frontiers. Killmonger and Storm are guerrilla fighters who stand against Moon Knight (a collective name used by Ra and Khonshu), regardless of Wakandan policies.

=== Gods and Kings (#7–12) ===
While allying with Killmonger and Storm against Ra and Khonshu after T'Chaka saves him from a suicide bomber, Black Panther learns something new about vibranium. The new information that T'Challa learns about vibranium causes him to send Killmonger and Storm to find the Sorcerer Supreme, who can help him understand vibranium.

When a H.A.N.D. helicopter attacks and wounds Killmonger, Inan casts a spell for the helicopter to fall as it gets swallowed by a giant shark. After healing Killmonger, Inan accelerates Storm and Killmonger's departure to Wakanda by opening a portal.

As Shuri and the Dora Milaje have a parley with the soldiers working for Ra and Khonshu, a single combat is issued between Black Panther and Moon Knight; the victor will claim Wakanda and its vibranium. After Black Panther saves a group of medical workers from mercenaries, he gets his injuries tended to. On his way back, Black Panther tells Shuri to forward a message to Moon Knight that he agrees to the challenge.

After having a meditative session with Matron Imala regarding a vision where he kills Khonshu, Black Panther heads to where he will face him. As visions of people demand that Black Panther finishes off Khonshu, Inan arrives with Storm and Killmonger and breaks up the fight. She states that whatever problem Black Panther is having with vibranium, it is not too late to save everything he believes in.

=== Darkness and Light (#13–18) ===
While Khonshu recuperates in the presence of Ra, Inan talks to Black Panther. He asks Inan what she knows about vibranium which is woven around Earth. Black Panther stated that they laid claim to Khonshu's temple and found no answers. When Black Panther claims that the vibranium is alive, Inan casts a spell that taps into the vibranium's memory and accidentally manifests a monstrous figure that Inan claims is the vibranium's consciousness called the Progenitor. Inan casts a spell that sends the Progenitor into deep space.

As mercenaries target a vibranium shipment in Nigeria, one of the mercenaries is possessed by the vibranium's consciousness. The vibranium jumps to the body of Adi, a special ops agent who was working with the mercenaries. Matron Imala tells Black Panther to remove all vibranium from his costume.

In Nigeria, a doctor named Amon is approached by the possessed Adi who killed his wife Lupa before committing defenestration on him. The following night at the Office of National Security, Killmonger and Storm meet with Mr. Ola and ask for a material called Dark Vibranium. Ola is sniped by a mysterious sniper, who escapes on motorcycle. Black Panther captures and interrogates the sniper, who is revealed to be Adi's brother Chima. It is revealed that the Dark Vibranium is a gateway.

In Nigeria, Black Panther confronts the country's Defense Minister to find the gateway. The next day, T'Challa has a vision of Bast, who states that his biggest test is ahead and to find her. When Black Panther re-enters the house, he finds Storm gone and the Progenitor, Z'Non, inside. Z'Non claims that Black Panther and Storm will help them destroy Wakanda.

=== Issues #19–24 ===
Killmonger interrogates Ra and Khonshu for knowledge about vibranium. Meanwhile, T'Challa is attacked by Z'Non, but is saved by Bast and the spirits of past Black Panthers. Bast approaches T'Challa and offers to train him to be ready when Z'Non returns. Killmonger learns that the entirety of Wakanda is a gateway that will allow gods to visit the mortal world. T'Challa's blood is a tribute to the gods and that they need to find T'Challa if he is to claim his power.

Bast reveals to T'Challa how Vibranium came to Earth via a curator who came from a dying world. Bast tells T'Challa that the "archivists" have returned and planted their seed. Bast tells T'Challa to prepare his soul and Wakanda to stop the Progenitors fail. T'Challa wakes up as he dons his Black Panther outfit and tells his ancestors that Wakanda will no longer hide themselves from the world.

While exploring a series of ruins, Shuri explains to Okoye that the Progenitors gave the Wakandans the opposite gifts in the form of Dark Vibranium. She also denies being involved with T'Chaka's death. As Killmonger and the Dora Milaje continue exploring the ruins, they find engravings depicting the Progenitors before they are suddenly ambushed. Black Panther saves the group and opens the door that the biomechs were guarding, finding liquid vibranium.

Storm is captured by the Vodu-Khan, a group of priestesses who have her give birth to the Child of Light to bring about a new age. Storm is contacted by Bast, stating that what she gave birth to is not her child and it must be destroyed. With Killmonger's aid, Storm breaks free and helps Black Panther to take down Imala. Bast shows up to heal Killmonger while stating that the child is a gateway.

To prepare for an invasion, T'Challa tells Shuri to have anyone who can fight prepare for battle. Black Panther and Shuri head to a building, where he is shown an invention that is considered the "Fists of Wakanda". The Child of Light is confronted by Black Panther in a large black panther-like vehicle as Storm joins the fight. The Child of Light has the Vodu-Khan receive their "gods" and continue east. During the battle, the black panther vehicle explodes and Black Panther and the Child of Light disappear.

Black Panther is transported to another dimension, where he is confronted by the Progenitors and is told that he destroyed the Child of Light. Black Panther states that he will not stand with them, but negotiates with the Progenitors, stating that he wants "peace through strength". Inan's astral form pulls Black Panther out of the Progenitors' dimension and brings him back to Wakanda. Some time later, Wakanda works on establishing interconnecting towns and villages with shared resources. T'Challa then addresses his people that his people are not safe and neither is the world, as the Progenitors will eventually return. They must prepare to join the rest of the world as a way to make the world safer. T'Challa later meets with Killmonger, who is told to kill Black Panther and take over leadership of Wakanda should the Progenitors take control of him.

== Characters ==
=== Main characters ===
- T'Challa / Black Panther: T'Challa was the Black Panther, the king and defender of the isolated yet technologically advanced nation of Wakanda, which was rich in vibranium and situated within the Upper and Lower Kingdoms. Succeeding his father T'Chaka, he ascended to the throne, ruling in conjunction with his sister Princess Shuri and his consort Queen Okoye. When his father T'Chaka was assassinated following Khonshu and Ra's attempted annexation of the entire African continent, T'Challa is forced to take up arms as Black Panther and wage a violent crusade against the self-proclaimed Egyptian Gods.
- Okoye: Okoye was the former general of the Dora Milaje royal guard, their present High Mentor, and the Queen of the secluded technologically advanced African nation of Wakanda. She was wed to King T'Challa, the bearer of the mantle of the Black Panther, in accordance with tradition.
- Shuri: Shuri is the younger sister of T'Challa and one of the smartest people on the planet. Unlike her brother, Shuri is a lot more eager to go to war than her brother is while T'Challa chooses caution before acting.
- Erik Killmonger / Killmonger: Erik Killmonger, also known simply as Killmonger, was previously a resident of the secluded and technologically advanced nation of Wakanda. However, Killmonger became disillusioned with the contrasting living conditions between Wakanda and the outside world and decided to leave in order to assist the impoverished people of Africa. As Killmonger acts as a revolutionary alongside his partner and lover Wind-Rider to free the entire continent from the Moon Knight, he and Wind-Rider would later join T'Challa in his mission.
- Ororo Munroe / Wind-Rider / Storm: Ororo Munroe is a freedom fighter from Africa known as Wind-Rider and the partner of Killmonger. She opposes the violent annexation orchestrated by Khonshu and Ra.
- Bast: An Egyptian cat god and patron of the Black Panthers.

=== Antagonists ===
- Lord Ra: One of the two Lords of the Upper and Lower Kingdoms and one half of the Moon Knight duo. He and Khonshu are also members of the Maker's Council.
- Lord Khonshu: One of the two Lords of the Upper and Lower Kingdoms and one half of the Moon Knight duo, he wears a combat suit that resembles both aspects of the Earth-616 iterations of both Khonshu and Moon Knight. Khonshu and Ra are also members of the Maker's Council.
- Progenitor / Z'Non: The spirit of vibranium.

=== Neutral characters ===
- Matron Imala: She is the leader of the Sisterhood of the Vodu-Khan, mystic priestesses of Wakanda. Matron Imala serves as an aide to T'Challa regarding to the visions he has of the future and the war between Wakanda and the Moon Knight.
- Inan / Sorceress Supreme: An immensely powerful occultist of questionable sanity who is believed to be the current Sorcerer Supreme. She was held captive and tortured by the organization H.A.N.D. within an Eastern European Black Site for three years straight before finally breaching containment. Due to T'Challa being in need of a magic specialist who can provide insight on vibranium's supernatural nature, Killmonger and Storm seek to recruit her to Wakanda's cause.

=== Minor characters ===
- T'Chaka: The father of T'Challa and the former King of Wakanda, before he was assassinated by a member of the Moon Knight who infiltrated herself to Wakanda, T'Chaka saved his son so he did not died with him. The death of T'Chaka was the catalyst that made T'Challa engage war with Khonshu and Ra.
- Vibranium / Progenitor / God of Material: Vibranium is the powerful alien metal with vibrational properties that was used as main source for Wakanda's technology. It would soon be revealed that the vibranium was not truly an element, it was a divine sentient being that has been living in symbiosis with Wakanda's people since the night it first landed in their territory ages ago.
- Green Element / God of Flesh: The Green Element is the vibranium's direct counterpart that landed in Africa around the same time it did. Just like the vibranium, the Green Element is a divine sentient being in the form of a glowing alien metal that by itself is functionally inert. When brought into contact with vibranium and kinetic energy, it can manipulate and radically bolster organic life.

=== Organizations ===
- The Moon Knights: The well-equipped military organization that rules the Upper and Lower Kingdoms with an iron fist, this militia are the loyal servants to Khonshu and Ra.
- Vodu-Khan: The Sisterhood of the Vodu-Khan are mystical priestesses that have lived in Wakanda for many years where they know many secrets while also influencing the beliefs of society.
- H.A.N.D.: The Heroic Anomaly Neutralization Directorate, or H.A.N.D. for short, is an organization that acts as a secret police to the Maker and his council. H.A.N.D.'s main objective is to enforce the Maker's will and prevent an Age of Heroes by systematically eradicating any potential superpowered phenomena.
- Machine Men: A paramilitary transhumanists who wield black market technology.

== Reception ==
The first issue had high sales, so Marvel ordered a second printing, which hit the stands by the time of Ultimate Black Panther #2. It featured a new cover art by R.B. Silva.

Spencer Perry from Comicbook.com considers that the comic book wasted the chance to make a radical reinvention of the comic. Instead of that, it plays it safe, with most characters staying at their usual characterizations. The comic takes a strong influence from the Black Panther film, both in the chosen cast and in the visual appearances. Perry points out that even that had already been done by the mainstream Black Panther comics. He also points that the comic draws influence from the Dune novel, with the political intrigue and rival factions. However, he considers that the comic is still of good quality.

I-j Wheaton from CBR praises the quality of the dialogue, with an adequate vocabulary and pacing. He also praises the arts, in particular the architecture of the city and the clothing of the characters, that provide a sense of Afro-futurism. The art is also strong on the emotions seen at the character's faces, complementing the brief and precise lines of dialogue. The dark and moody colors provide the right atmosphere, but only in the situations that call for it, as it alternates with brighter scenes.

== Collected editions ==
#	Title	Material collected	Format	Pages	Released	ISBN
1	Peace And War	Ultimate Black Panther #1–6	TPB	152	1 Oct 2024	978-1302957308
2	Gods And Kings	Ultimate Black Panther #7–12	TPB	136	15 Apr 2025	978-1302958237
3	Darkness And Light	Ultimate Black Panther #13–18	TPB	136	14 Oct 2025	978-1302958244
4	Destiny and Destruction	Ultimate Black Panther #19–24	TPB	136	14 Apr 2026	978-1302958251
