= Ultimate Universe =

Marvel Comics imprint

"Ultimate Universe" thematic stories
- From up and left to bottom and right on the cover of Ultimate Endgame: the Maker, Iron Lad, Spider-Man, Black Panther, Wolverine, Wasp, Captain America, Maystorm, and Doom.

Publication information
- Publisher: Marvel Comics
Title(s)
- Ultimate Spider-Man
- Ultimate Black Panther
- Ultimate X-Men
- Ultimate Wolverine
- The Ultimates
- Genre: Superhero
- Publication date: June 2023 – June 2026

The Ultimate Universe was an imprint of comic books published by Marvel Comics from 2023 to 2026. The imprint was overseen by writer Jonathan Hickman. It reimagines several classic Marvel characters in a new fictional continuity, after Hickman and artist Bryan Hitch's Ultimate Invasion limited series depicted the Maker (the Reed Richards of Earth-1610) shaping a new world in his image, resulting in Earth-6160, a new Earth preceded by an alternate history.

While it shares its name with the earlier Ultimate Marvel imprint that ran from 2000 to 2015, it is not a direct reboot. Whereas the original Ultimate Marvel started by updating the origins of Marvel Universe characters in a then-modern but recognizable Earth-1610, the Ultimate Universe (Earth-6160) features entirely new interpretations of Marvel characters set in a radically altered sociopolitical status quo caused by the Maker.

== Publication history ==
The original Ultimate Marvel imprint ceased to be published in 2015, and was destroyed in-story in the Secret Wars crossover, with Maker being transferred to Earth-616, the Prime Universe. Writer Donny Cates used the character during his run in the Venom comic book, with the character trying to restore and return to his original universe. At the end of the story arc, Maker returned to a devastated part of the Ultimate Universe, and later hinted he was planning an invasion of the main Marvel Universe. However, Cates had to pull out of writing the series because of a car accident that left him with six months worth of memory loss, and the project was given to Jonathan Hickman instead. Hickman had worked with the Maker character in the original Ultimate imprint and wrote the aforementioned Secret Wars crossover.

Hickman started the project with Ultimate Invasion which he took on another path ignoring both the original Ultimate Universe and the plots in Venom Vol. 4. It shows instead Maker moving to a new alternate universe called Earth-6160 and changing it with extensive time travel to prevent the existence of most superheroes and make himself its unquestionable leader. By the end of the story, Maker is defeated and trapped inside The City with Iron Man / Howard Stark and a variation of Kang the Conqueror, with The City scheduled to open up in 24 months. The Maker's Council, a shadow government that manages international relations in a "power behind the throne" style, remains a threat as the new comics that follow are set within such background. Howard's son Tony Stark continues his work to take the world back while taking on the name of Iron Lad.

The first comic was Ultimate Universe #1, a one-shot from Hickman and Stefano Caselli that further developed the context in which the comics of the line would take place. The flagship comic of the line is Ultimate Spider-Man, by Hickman and Marco Checchetto. In contrast with the original Ultimate Spider-Man comic, it stars an adult Peter Parker who is married to Mary Jane Watson and has two kids before he becomes Spider-Man. Hickman said that he was inspired by the version of the character seen in the film Spider-Man: Into the Spider-Verse.

Writer Bryan Hill, who had previously worked on Blade, writes Ultimate Black Panther with Caselli. The comic is about Black Panther defending the continent of Africa from Lord Khonshu and Lord Ra. Hill said "I was invigorated by this opportunity because in addition to my immense respect for Jonathan Hickman's detailed storytelling, the idea of shepherding this bold new take on Black Panther in this event gives me a platform to do the kind of broad, epic, storytelling I've always wanted to do in comics. My influences range from the history of Black Panther comics, to Ryan Coogler's incredible work with the recent films, to Frank Herbert's world-building capacity of Dune. This is something people won't expect, in the best of ways, and full credit to Marvel and editors Wil Moss and Michelle Marchese for bringing this creative possibility to me."

Peach Momoko, from Demon Days: X-Men, writes and illustrates the new Ultimate X-Men comics. Armor is the main character, and the X-Men are tied to folklore and magic. Momoko said "I am very honored to be a part of the new Ultimate Universe. I am very careful in delivering the unique X-Men mutant elements while still being true to my vision and voice. I am also very proud (and surprised) that I was given enough freedom from C.B. Cebulski and Jonathan Hickman to create a brand-new X-Men character. It might not be the normal portrayal of a superhero... but, just like with my Momoko-verse stories, I am excited to introduce everyone to this new world."

In February 2024, it was announced that Deniz Camp and Juan Frigeri would write and illustrate The Ultimates, following Iron Lad, Doom, Captain America, Thor, Sif, Giant-Man, and the Wasp as they band together to fight back against the Maker's Council and take back their world while gaining new allies along the way. Camp said "The new Ultimates line is the most exciting super hero comics event in years, and it's humbling to be a part of it! We are reinventing these classic characters and archetypes to be as surprising and vital as when they were first introduced. Our Ultimates is an evolution not just of the Avengers, but of the whole super hero team concept; from the grand and operatic to the small and personal, THE ULTIMATES will feel like no Avengers or Ultimates comic ever before! That's our ambition, anyway; tune in to find out if we succeed."

Marvel Editor C.B. Cebulski announced at the 2024 San Diego Comic-Con that there would be a one-shot comic titled One Year In, with a recap of everything that happened during the previous year in the Ultimate Universe. He also announced a new ongoing series to be released in late 2024 or early 2025, with no details about the name or characters from the comic. At the 2024 New York Comic Con, it was announced the book would be Ultimate Wolverine by Chris Condon and Alessandro Cappuccio with the official synopsis reading "In order to maintain control of their corner of the Maker’s world, three members of his council – Magik, Colossus and Omega Red – deploy their most lethal asset: The Winter Soldier! But WHO is the weapon behind the mask?".

The Free Comic Book Day 2025 one-shot issue for May 3, 2025 featured a prologue for the limited series Ultimate Spider-Man: Incursion, which first issue was published on June 4, 2025. The story features Miles Morales trying to save his sister Billie after she was accidentally transported from Earth-616 to Earth-6160. Marvel also announced another one-shot issue titled Ultimate Hawkeye, which will be published on September 24, 2025, and focuses on Charli Ramsey, who has taken on the mantle of Hawkeye.

In July 2025, Marvel announced Ultimate Endgame, the final crossover event that debuted on December 31, 2025. The one-shot Ultimate Universe: Two Years In will serve as prequel to the event, setting to be published on December 3, 2025, which will follow the Guardians of the Galaxy and introduce the Earth-6160 version of Daredevil who happens to be a Beyonder.

In October 2025, during a retailer day at New York Comic Con, Marvel announced that the Ultimate Universe would come to an end in April 2026 with the release of Ultimate Endgame #5. In January 2026, Marvel announced a one-shot, Ultimate Universe Finale, which will serve as the grand finale of the line and unite all of the Ultimate Universe series' creators for one last story set on Earth-6160.

Some concepts of this continuity will be featured in the 2026 Marvel Universe crossover event Avengers: Armageddon alongside the miniseries Reborn: Ultimate Impact, after Miles Morales' return to Earth-616 with the Origin Boxes of 6160.

== Premise ==
In the 2023 miniseries Ultimate Invasion, the Maker orchestrates an elaborate escape from his imprisonment in Earth-616, ultimately building a portal to another universe, Earth-6160. Upon arrival in 1963, he uses his knowledge of future events and technology to seize control of the world, eliminating and torturing potential opponents to his regime. He deals, overtly or covertly, with all external threats that traditional superheroes would otherwise handle in other Earths, like Galactus or the Kree–Skrull War. He also forges alliances and helps to install figures to depose heroes and figures opposed to him, such as when he assists Loki in taking control of Asgard and other realms.

Due to the alteration of world history, most heroes are non-existent or heavily corrupted. The origins of many heroes and the initial beginning of a Heroic Age are averted. Since mutants had no central figures to guide them, their political movements were destroyed and have been forced underground; some have been co-opted by legitimate actors. The Punisher became a notorious historical figure whose tactics were co-opted by a Neo-Nazi group called the Red Skulls, inspired by the villain of the same name. The Savage Land is industrialized and all prehistoric life is extinct after a violent takeover by a group of mercenaries under Roxxon's command in the 1970s. Attilan was destroyed and the surviving Inhuman population was scattered across the globe.

By 2023, the Maker has fully transformed the world into a series of political spheres controlled by his political allies and their vassals, integrating several superheroes and existing regimes while installing neo-feudal regimes in major parts of the world. Geopolitics has been replaced by a form of war economy practiced between power blocs controlled by the Maker and his Council. There are no known democracies left, and most states are personally dominated by small families, as with Hi no Kuni, the Eurasian Republic and others. When faced with threats, the Council utilizes their near-total control over local political and economic organizations to harass and confront dissidents; the Maker himself runs an advanced secret police organization known as H.A.N.D, which rapidly eliminates dissenters.

The modern world is ultimately organized as such:

- North America was reformed into the North American Union, a technocratic confederation controlled by Stane/Stark Industries under Obadiah Stane and Howard Stark; after the death of Stane and Stark's entrapment in the City, the polity is secretly divided up by other members of the Maker's Council. Otherwise, the country appears largely run by a collection of corporations, such as Roxxon and Oscorp, who have assumed control of critical civil functions such as electricity and healthcare. This is the main setting for Ultimate Spider-Man where it is shown that Wilson Fisk is a shadow governor in New York City and a recurring setting for The Ultimates.
- Latin America is dominated by the Society of South America, run by the Hellfire Club under Emmanuel da Costa.
- Europe is run by the European Coalition, itself dominated by Henri Duggary, a French aristocrat who controls Avalon. Duggary has also de facto controlled the Eastern third of North America following its division in Ultimate Invasion; Wilson Fisk now answers to him.
- Africa is dominated by the Upper and Lower Kingdoms, based in Egypt. Both Kingdoms are governed by Lord Ra and Lord Khonshu; Nigeria and other postcolonial West African states still exist, albeit with unclear statuses. Wakanda, which has remained largely isolationist, remains outside of their control. This is the setting for Ultimate Black Panther.
- Russia and parts of Central Asia are governed by the Eurasian Republic, currently geopolitically antagonistic to much of the rest of the world. Russia has reverted back to the Tsarist autocracy and is ruled by the Rasputin Family (consisting of Colossus, Magik, and Omega Red). The Republic is designated by the Maker as the primary ward for mutants which its government attempts to use as weapons for secret police units. This is the setting for Ultimate Wolverine.
- South Asia and Southeast Asia are under the jurisdiction of the Children of Eternal Light, a faux-Buddhist martial arts cult led by the Hulk who rules K'un-L'un and all the other seven cities of heaven.
- Much of metropolitan China, Korea, and Japan are governed by Hi no Kuni, dominated by a bloc of three clans called the Harada-Yoshida Alliance (consisting of Emperor Sunfire, Viper, and Silver Samurai). It appears to primarily succeed Japan, retaining a National Diet at the eponymous building in Tokyo. This is the setting for Ultimate X-Men.
- Central Asia and Latveria fall within the bounds of The City, a technologically advanced fortress solely controlled by the Maker. Due to his political power, it is also the de facto capital of the world.

At the end of Ultimate Invasion, the Maker attempts to have Howard Stark and Doom (Reed Richards) (Note: As revenge against the Reed Richards of Earth-616, Maker tortures Reed by killing members of the Fantastic Four, disfiguring him before putting a Doctor Doom mask on him, then detaining him in an enclosed chamber, only allowing him to use that moniker. The character continues to insist on being called Doom.) construct a time machine for him, called the Immortus Engine, hoping to use it to consolidate his control over the world in perpetuity. Deeply repulsed by the global system the Maker has constructed, Stark instead weakens his defenses, allowing for a cataclysmic battle started by Kang to close The City shut, trapping them all inside. With the Maker absent, the ensuing political ripples allow for the emergence of organized defiance to the world order. In particular, the Ultimates emerge as an effective guerilla army, recruiting the worst victims of the global order to undermine the new regimes. The Maker's Council begins to break into infighting, with members launching unauthorized contingencies in the hopes of reinforcing and gaining power. These frictions serve as the overall background for the individual series.

== Publications ==
=== Ongoing series ===
Title	Issues	Writer	Artist(s)	Colourist	Debut date	Conclusion date
Ultimate Spider-Man Vol. 3	#1–24	Jonathan Hickman	Marco Checchetto; David Messina	Matt Wilson	January 10, 2024	February 18, 2026
Ultimate Black Panther Vol. 1	#1–24	Bryan Hill	Stefano Caselli; Carlos Nieto	David Curiel	February 7, 2024	January 21, 2026
Ultimate X-Men Vol. 2	#1–24	Peach Momoko (Note: Zack Davisson is also credited with script adaptation.)			March 6, 2024	February 11, 2026
The Ultimates Vol. 4	#1–24	Deniz Camp	Juan Frigeri	Federico Blee	June 5, 2024	May 27, 2026
Ultimate Wolverine Vol. 1	#1–16	Chris Condon	Alessandro Cappuccio; Alex Lins	Bryan Valenza	January 15, 2025	April 15, 2026

=== Limited series ===
Title	Issues	Writer	Artist	Colourist	Debut date	Conclusion date
Ultimate Invasion	#1–4	Jonathan Hickman	Bryan Hitch	Alex Sinclair	June 21, 2023	September 27, 2023
Ultimate Spider-Man: Incursion	#1–5	Deniz Camp; Cody Ziglar	Jonas Scharf	Edgar Delgado	June 4, 2025	October 22, 2025
Ultimate Endgame	#1–5	Deniz Camp	Jonas Scharf; Terry Dodson (pencils); Rachel Dodson (inks)	Edgar Delgado; Federico Blee	December 31, 2025	June 24, 2026

=== One-shots ===
Title	Writer	Artist	Colourist	Debut date
Ultimate Universe	Jonathan Hickman	Stefano Caselli	David Curiel	November 1, 2023
Free Comic Book Day 2024: Ultimate Universe/Spider-Man	Deniz Camp; Zeb Wells; Al Ewing	Juan Frigeri; Ryan Stegman (pencils); JP Mayer (inks); Iban Coello	Federico Blee; Sonia Oback; Frank D'Armata	May 4, 2024
Ultimate Universe: One Year In	Deniz Camp; Chris Condon	Jonas Sharf; Alessandro Cappuccio	Mattia Iacono; Bryan Valenza	December 11, 2024
Free Comic Book Day 2025: Amazing Spider-Man/Ultimate Universe	Deniz Camp; Joe Kelly; Cody Ziglar	John Romita Jr. Jonas Scharf	Bryan Valenza	May 3, 2025
Ultimate Hawkeye	Deniz Camp; Taboo; B. Earl	Juan Frigeri; Michael Sta. Maria	Alex Sinclair	September 24, 2025
Ultimate Universe: Two Years In	Deniz Camp; Alex Paknadel	Lee Ferguson; Francesco Manna; Pat Boutin; Javier Pulido; Phil Noto	Guru-eFX; Erick Arciniega; Federico Blee; Javier Pulido; Phil Noto	December 3, 2025
Ultimate Universe Finale	Deniz Camp; Chris Condon; Jonathan Hickman; Bryan Hill; Peach Momoko	Alessandro Cappuccio; Stefano Caselli; Marco Checchetto; Juan Frigeri; Peach Momoko	TBA	June 24, 2026

=== Related material ===
Title	Issues	Writer	Artist(s)	Colourist	Debut date	Conclusion date
Miles Morales: Spider-Man Vol. 2	#39, #42	Cody Ziglar	Luigi Zagaria; Marco Renna	Bryan Valenza	October 22, 2025	January 28, 2026
Reborn: Ultimate Impact	#1-5	Chris Condon	Stefano Caselli	Marte Gracia	May 20, 2026	September 30, 2026

== Collected editions ==
#	Title	Material collected	Format	Pages	Released	ISBN
Ultimate Spider-Man Vol. 3
1	Married with Children	Ultimate Spider-Man (2024) #1–6	TPB	168	10 Sep 2024	978-1302957292
2	The Paper	Ultimate Spider-Man (2024) #7–12	TPB	136	18 Mar 2025	978-1302958282
3	Family Business	Ultimate Spider-Man (2024) #13–18	TPB	136	23 Sep 2025	978-1302958299
4	One Last Day	Ultimate Spider-Man (2024) #19–24; material from Ultimate Universe: Finale #1	TPB	136	21 July 2026	978-1302958305
Ultimate Black Panther
1	Peace and War	Ultimate Black Panther #1–6	TPB	152	11 Oct 2024	978-1302957308
2	Gods and Kings	Ultimate Black Panther #7–12	TPB	136	15 Apr 2025	978-1302958237
3	Darkness and Light	Ultimate Black Panther #13–18	TPB	136	14 Oct 2025	978-1302958244
4	Destiny and Destruction	Ultimate Black Panther #19–24; material from Ulimate Universe: Finale #1	TPB	136	4 Aug 2026	978-1302958251
Ultimate X-Men Vol. 2
1	Fears and Hates	Ultimate X-Men (2024) #1–6, material from Ultimate Universe (2023)	TPB	160	5 Nov 2024	978-1302957315
2	Children of the Atom	Ultimate X-Men (2024) #7–12	TPB	136	27 May 2025	978-1302958336
3	The Realm of the Mind	Ultimate X-Men (2024) #13–18	TPB	136	11 Nov 2025	978-1302958343
4	Children's Whereabouts	Ultimate X-Men (2024) #19–24; material from Ulimate Universe: Finale #1	TPB	144	7 July 2026	978-1302958350
The Ultimates Vol. 3
1	Fix the World	Ultimate Universe (2023); The Ultimates (2024) #1–6; FCBD 2024: Ultimate Universe	TPB	192	4 Feb 2025	978-1302957513
2	All Power to the People	The Ultimates (2024) #7–12; material from Ultimate Universe: One Year In	TPB	168	16 Sep 2025	978-1302958183
3	Rescue Mission	The Ultimates (2024) #13–18; Ultimate Hawkeye	TPB	168	17 Mar 2026	978-1302958190
4	Uprising	The Ultimates (2024) #19–24; Ultimate Universe: Two Years In #1; material from Ulimate Universe: Finale #1	TPB	184	4 Aug 2026	978-1302958206
Ultimate Wolverine
1	The Winter Soldier	Ultimate Wolverine #1–6; material from Ultimate Universe: One Year In	TPB	144	16 Sep 2025	978-1302962050
2	Logan	Ultimate Wolverine #7–12	TPB	136	31 Mar 2026	978-1302962067
3	The Maker's Mark	Ultimate Wolverine #13–16; material from Ulimate Universe: Finale #1	TPB	112	1 Sep 2026	978-1302968120
Other
	Ultimate Invasion	Ultimate Invasion #1–4	TPB	192	26 Mar 2024	978-0785194736
	Ultimate Incursion	Ultimate Spider-Man: Incursion (2025) #1–5, FCBD 2025: Ultimate Universe	TPB	128	17 Feb 2026	978-1302964818
	Ultimate Endgame	Ultimate Endgame (2025) #1–5	TPB	120	22 Sep 2026	978-1302967307
	Ultimate Universe: Invasion Box Set Slipcase	Ultimate Invasion; Ultimate Spider-Man Vol. 1: Married With Children; Ultimate X-Men Vol. 1: Fears And Hates; Ultimate Black Panther Vol. 1: Peace And War; Ultimates Vol. 1: Fix The World; Ultimate Wolverine Vol. 1: The Winter Soldier	TPB box set	1,040	4 Nov 2025	978-1302968175

== See also ==
- Midnight Universe by Marvel Comics. Published after the discontinuation of the Ultimate Universe in 2026.
- Absolute Universe by DC Comics
- Energon Universe by Image Comics and Skybound Entertainment
