= Hawkeye (comics) =

Various Marvel Comics characters

Hawkeye is the name of several fictional characters appearing in American comic books published by Marvel Comics.

== Mainstream versions ==
=== Clint Barton ===
Clint Barton was the first character to take up the name of Hawkeye. He was originally a supervillain that assisted Black Widow and fought Iron Man before he joined the Avengers.

Jeremy Renner portrays Clint Barton in the projects set in the Marvel Cinematic Universe.

=== Kate Bishop ===
At the time when Clint Barton was temporarily deceased, Kate Bishop operated as Hawkeye as a member of the Young Avengers.

Hailee Steinfeld portrays Kate Bishop in the projects set in the Marvel Cinematic Universe.

== Pretenders ==
=== Bullseye ===
When Norman Osborn formed the Dark Avengers, he had Bullseye become the Dark Avengers version of Hawkeye.

=== Barney Barton ===
When Norman Osborn formed a second version of the Dark Avengers, he recruited Barney Barton to be this team's version of Hawkeye.

== Other versions ==
=== Golden Archer ===
At one point, the Golden Archer used the codename of Hawkeye.

=== Marvel 2099 ===
There have been two versions of Hawkeye in Marvel 2099:

==== Max ====
Several alternate universe versions of Hawkeye exist in Marvel 2099 and its derivative universes. In "Secret Wars" storyline, Hawkeye is Max, an archer who possesses the wings and talons of a hawk. An unidentified 2099 reality version of Hawkeye, who is also a hawk hybrid, opposed the Anti-Vigilante Act. A third version of the 2099 Hawkeye is entirely human, unlike his predecessors.

==== Unnamed assassin ====
On the unified Marvel 2099 reality of Earth-2099, an unnamed person operated as an assassin named Hawkeye.

=== Onslaught Reborn ===
An alternate universe variant of Hawkeye, amalgamated with Wolverine, appears in the series Onslaught Reborn. This version originates from a pocket dimension created by Franklin Richards.

=== Ultimate Universe ===
An alternate universe version of Hawkeye from Earth-6160 appears in the Ultimate Universe imprint. This version is Charli Ramsey, a Native American who obtained Clint Barton's Hawkeye equipment and leads a single-handed crusade against Roxxon. Initially a solo hero, Ramsey later joins the Ultimates. Ramsey is two-spirit and use they/them pronouns. Additionally, Clint Barton as Ronin appears in the one-shot Ultimate Hawkeye, where he is killed by Exterminatrix.
