= Ultimate Spider-Man (2024) =

Comic book series

- Cover of Ultimate Spider-Man (Vol 3) #2, with Spider-Man (Peter Parker) and Green Goblin (Harry Osborn)

Publication information
- Publisher: Marvel Comics
- Schedule: Monthly
- Format: Ongoing
- Genre: Superhero
- Publication date: January 2024 – February 2026
- No. of issues: 24
- Main character(s): Peter Parker / Spider-Man; Richard Parker II / Venom; Harry Osborn / Green Goblin; Wilson Fisk / Kingpin

Creative team
- Written by: Jonathan Hickman
- Pencillers: Marco Checchetto; David Messina
- Letterer: Cory Petit
- Colorist: Matthew Wilson
- Editors: Wil Moss; Michelle Marchese

Ultimate Spider-Man is an ongoing comic book series about Spider-Man, part of the Ultimate Universe imprint, written by Jonathan Hickman and illustrated by Marco Checchetto. It began publication in January 2024. The series follows an older Peter Parker who becomes Spider-Man for the first time later in life, already a father of two children (Richard and May) and married to Mary Jane "MJ" Watson-Parker, as opposed to his early/late teens like in the mainline. The series is part of the new Ultimate Universe timeline of Earth-6160, which puts several Marvel characters in a radically altered sociopolitical status quo, including elements of alternate history.

A multiversal crossover with Miles Morales: Spider-Man titled Ultimate Spider-Man: Incursion was published in June 2025.

== Publication history ==
Ultimate Spider-Man is the first ongoing series from the Ultimate Universe imprint, following the Ultimate Invasion miniseries that introduced it. The former comic was a reinvention of the Spider-Man character as a teenager still attending school, in contrast with the older character from the main continuity. The new comic uses a similar angle, but makes Spider-Man older instead of younger, and also married and with two kids. Hickman said that he was inspired by the version of the character seen in the film Spider-Man: Into the Spider-Verse. Another significant departure is that Uncle Ben, a character that usually dies during Spider-Man's origin story, is alive in the new continuity. Although Harry Osborn keeps the Green Goblin identity in the new continuity, he is reimagined as a superhero, closer to the classic portrayal of Iron Man.

A multiversal crossover with Miles Morales: Spider-Man titled Ultimate Spider-Man: Incursion was published in June 2025.

In July 2025, during San Diego Comic-Con, it was announced that the series would be concluding with its 24th issue in December that same year, with Hickman remarking that this was always the plan and nothing in the series deviated from his initial pitch.

== Plot ==
=== "Married with Children" (#1–6) ===
Following the "Ultimate Invasion" plotline, Peter Parker is a married man living in New York City with his wife Mary Jane "MJ" Watson and his two children Richard and May. His Aunt May has recently died as one of the casualties of a false flag attack orchestrated by the Maker's Council on Stark Tower, with the media framing Tony Stark as a terrorist and the culprit. Stark reveals to Peter that he was supposed to be bitten by a radioactive spider and become a superhero in his youth. He has retrieved the spider and offers Peter a chance to become a hero. Meanwhile, J. Jonah Jameson and Peter's uncle Ben Parker have resigned from the Daily Bugle over their creative differences to set up their own investigation into a series of apparent assassination attempts on the Daily Bugle's owner Wilson Fisk. Later, Peter reveals his identity as Spider-Man to armored vigilante, the "Green Goblin", who unmasks to show himself as Harry Osborn. Harry is married to Gwen Stacy-Osborn who runs Oscorp. As Peter reveals his identity to MJ, she suggests calling himself "Spider-Man".

=== "The Paper" (#7–12) ===
Now friends, Harry Osborn introduces Peter Parker to Dr. Otto Octavius who tells Harry and Peter that their suits are based on Stark/Stane designs and run on the same network, along with Iron Lad — Tony Stark. Meanwhile, the Kingpin and his assistant James Wesley meet with Kingpin's lieutenants Black Cat, Kraven the Hunter, Mister Negative, Mole Man, and Mysterio and discussing the issue with vigilantes Spider-Man and Green Goblin interrupting their plans. J. Jonah Jameson and Ben Parker launch "The Paper" including their investigation into the different crimes being stopped by Spider-Man and Green Goblin while using former co-worker Robbie Robertson as their inside person. Elsewhere, Otto offers Spider-Man and Green Goblin a way to free themselves from Stark/Stane, only for the pair to be ambushed by Black Cat. During the fight, Black Cat is blasted off the building by Green Goblin and is loaded into an ambulance. Jameson and Ben meet with Wesley in an attempt to arrange a negotiation with his boss. Then they speak to Gwen Stacy-Osborn about how Stark/Stane was sold off cheap. Later that night while having dinner with Peter's family, Ben speaks to MJ about their meeting with Gwen. Two days later, Harry visits "The Paper" and advises Ben and Jameson not to write the Osborn story. He does cave in on the identity of those who actually killed Harry's parents and Ben's wife while giving them a USB drive about it. Under Harry's advice, they write out the story under the alias of "Ben Reilly" as they begin to run it. After brainwashing some people at the bank into attacking Spider-Man, Mister Negative tells Wilson Fisk and his fellow lieutenants about it as Black Cat recuperates in a wheelchair. After Mysterio is told by Walter Hardy that he has not given up his seat yet, Walter reveals that he brought his daughter Felicia Hardy to act in his place. While visiting Memorial Park, Peter learns that Uncle Ben knows about his Spider-Man activity when Harry Osborn visited "The Paper". He allows Peter to continue his and Harry's fight against Fisk. In December, Uncle Ben and J. Jonah Jameson attend the Parker family's Christmas party with Madeline Watson, Anna Watson, and Gayle Watson present. MJ keeps avoiding calls from Gwen Stacy while dealing with Gayle being bitter that she and Parker is still married while Gayle is going through a divorce. When MJ starts answering the phone, Gwen tells her that she has not heard from Harry lately. When MJ taps Peter, she finds that Peter is actually his sentient picotech suit. It is then shown that Peter and Harry are captives of Kraven.

=== "Family Business" (#13–18) ===
Richard Parker is trained by the picotech's A.I. in operating as Spider-Man while his father was missing. Below Staten Island, Mole Man learns from Kraven that he has Peter and Harry in his clutches. He will hunt them in Subterranea, which is filled with dinosaurs and other strange creatures. Mysterio crashes their meeting wanting to see her captives. Kraven takes them back to the surface to see Peter and Harry, who have been given bomb collars. Kraven begins the hunt to determine the fate of their loved ones and even encourages them to try to take him out. After being dropped into Subterranea, Peter and Harry's bomb collars come off. Meanwhile, Richard is confronted by Felicia Hardy as she introduces herself as the new Black Cat and the daughter of the first Black Cat.

Amidst the hunt in Subterranea, Harry is shot by Kraven. Peter punches Kraven unconscious and escapes at Mysterio's suggestion. Peter returns to Mary Jane and states that they have to leave as Fisk's men know about them. He does learn that Richard had used his Picotech suit and encountered Black Cat who knows that Richard was not the one who fought her father.

As Peter's family vacations in Bryce Canyon National Park, they have encounter Sandman, who attacks them. After tracing a signal to a nearby tower, Spider-Man destroys it and enables Sandman to return to his human form of William Baker. William informs both Spider-Men that he was investigating illegal experimentation at an A.I.M. facility where they captured him and turned him into Sandman. Both Spider-Men are thanked by Sandman, who takes his leave. Meanwhile, Ben Parker and Jameson are confronted by Fisk, Wesley, and Bullseye involving some of the stories printed by "The Paper" and Maker's Council having killed every man in the world named Ben Reilly. Fisk will allow them to continue working and advised them not to hide behind other people.

While at Harry's grave, Gwen Stacy flashes back to the last time she saw her father George Stacy and when she first met Harry Osborn. When her father died, she was brought into her father's organization of Mysterios, who are aware of their universe being influenced by the Maker and his Council. Quentin Beck is the one who welcomes Gwen into the group. There are also flashbacks to when Gwen married Harry and meeting Norman Osborn. With the Mysterio learning that Maker is trapped in The City for two years and that they need to wipe the "fog" away, Gwen also flashes back to when she first met Peter and Gwen. During the holiday season, Gwen is informed by Quentin that Kraven kidnapped Peter and Harry while not noticing about their alliance with Mole Man. After being told by Quentin that she will receive his amulet in two days, Gwen confronts Otto Octavius about her being watched as he confirms that it was Harry's plan if he was to go missing. At the advice of Quentin, Gwen fires him. In Subterranea, Gwen saves Harry and uses an illusion to make Peter think that Kraven killed Harry and make Kraven think he did it. After Peter left, Mysterio shot Kraven in the head as Harry ask what is going on. Back in the present, Gwen states to Harry that she was raised in this life. Harry states that they will "take the fight to them".

Ben is visited by Harry Osborn, who checks in on Peter's status and states that things are about to get worse. At Oscorp, Gwen meets with Robbie Robertson as he is revealed to be a Mysterio. Then she meets with Wilson Fisk and James Wesley, with Fisk giving condolences for what happened to Harry. As Fisk returns to his office, Wesley has Gwen go over some things that need signing. Once Fisk is gone, Wesley is revealed to be a Mysterio who helped Gwen find Harry. Once Wesley is gone, Harry emerges as he and Gwen prepare to "go to war". Traveling incognito, Harry meets up with Otto Octavius in his makeshift lab as the Green Goblin armor has maintenance done to it. Harry has a talk with the Norman Osborn A.I., who asks him not to make it ashamed of him again. Green Goblin and Mysterio raid Mister Negative's weapons factory, freeing the enslaved workers before blowing up the factory. While on vacation, Peter gets a call from Ben and is surprised that Harry is still alive stating that he needs him.

As the Parker family reunites with Harry Osborn, Ben and Jameson also arrive to watch over Peter's family. Meanwhile, the Mysterios meet over recent events involving the death of Kraven and an attack on one of Mister Negative's operations. Its member Aihan praises Gwen for disposing of Kraven. Spider-Man and Green Goblin find Peter's apartment a mess as Otto Octavius was crashing in it after doing some upgrades to it. Richard was revealed to have stowed away on Peter and Harry's airplane after getting a text from Felicia that she is in danger. This ends up being a trap, with Felicia confronting Richard alongside Kingpin, Walter Hardy, and the Bullseyes. Kingpin wants Richard to give Spider-Man to him. Felicia apologizes stating that what she did is in her nature and was not lying about her and Richard.

=== "One Last Day" (#19–24) ===
After having been put into a difficult choice by Kingpin in a flashback, Richard unwittingly lets the Picotech suit take over as it attacks Kingpin's allies. Kingpin escapes, but Felicia persuades the Picotech suit to spare her father. Back in the present, Richard mentions to Felicia that he had been grounded for both helping Felicia and what had happened. Meanwhile, Kingpin is waiting for Kraven to show up as Mister Negative questioned everyone at his estate and mentioned what Mysterio did to one of his operations, Mole Man claimed that Kraven was holed up in a peaceful part of the world somewhere, and James Wesley assumes that he is working with Mysterio. As Kingpin states that they will figure out what happened with Kraven later, Walter Hardy asks about the monster. Kingpin mentions what had happened when they met Spider-Man's son and that they will keep Felicia at arm's length for a while. Unbeknownst to them, Wesley has planted a bug so that Green Goblin and Mysterio can listen in. Mole Man later raids the Parker apartment and falls into a trap by Spider-Man. Mole Man informs Spider-Man that Kingpin and his followers are coming for him while mentioning that someone powerful can help him end this. After Peter and Mary Jane scold Richard for leaving the house, she wants Peter to tell her everything about Harry and Gwen.

Peter Parker and Mary Jane Watson meet Harry Osborn and Gwen Stacy at a restaurant, where Harry had a new staff tending to them as he didn't want anyone to find out that he faked his death. Meanwhile, Uncle Ben is helping Anna Watson babysit Richard and May. Peter and Mary Jane learn how Gwen helped Harry fake his death. Richard tells Uncle Ben about his encounter with Felicia Hardy and Kingpin. Mary Jone notes that their children will be at risk if Kingpin's forces come for them. After Richard and May are in their beds, Ben and Anna are visited by J. Jonah Jameson and Madeline Watson as Madeline says goodbye to Jameson. While in the restroom, Mary Jane learns about how each of the Mysterio share an amulet. When Mary Jane asks Gwen when she gets her amulet back, she says that it will be in 11 days. Mary Jane knocks her out and rejoins Peter and Harry stating that Gwen will get somebody killed one day.

Mister Negative has James Wesley abducted from the street and then kills the Bullseyes with him as he demands that Wesley tells him everything about Kingpin while recapping some his history that involved his sister Aihan. At "The Paper", Ben Parker and J. Jonah Jameson talk about the amount of information they have and what thread to pull. Meanwhile, Dr. Otto Octavius and Harry Osborn work in their lab as Octavius takes back the spider specimen he found that Harry tried to touch. More of Negative's history is shown as he rose to power in the criminal underworld and how he and his sister took down their rivals until Negative met Kingpin, who overpowered him leading to their allegiance. Negative uses his abilities to learn that Wesley is one of the Mysterio. The next day, Quentin Beck meets with the other Mysterio members, who demand that Gwen explains her actions as Gwen notes that Wesley is not well. More of Negative's flashbacks are shown as his sister was not pleased that he was beaten by Kingpin. Back to the previous day, Negative bestows on Wesley a gift of gratitude involving special glasses with a camera and microphone in it that enable Negative to see through them. The second gift is bestowed on Wesley as Negative begins to plan against the Hardy family, Mole Man, and Spider-Man's family. Back in the present, Wesley breaks down to the other Mysterio on what happened between him and Negative. He then reveals some explosives on the vest that was placed on him as Aihan figures that her brother is behind this. Negative has Wesley set off the explosives.

Three months later, Peter Parker has set up a satellite house in Subterranea while laying low. Ben Parker and J. Jonah Jameson are also laying low with the Parker family while continuing their work. Meanwhile, Spider-Man and Green Goblin are fighting a group of Bullseyes, who have been upgraded with lasers implanted beneath their eyepatches. Afterwards, Green Goblin sends Spider-Man home while mentioning that he misses Gwen. He then has a talk with the Norman Osborn A.I. who is proud of him. Later, Octavius builds a worm device to help infect the nodes that are connected to The City. He mentions to Richard that one of those nodes is in the heart of Kingpin's kingdom. Nearby Fisk Tower, Richard meets with Felicia Hardy.

One hour later, Mary Jane learns that Dr. Otto Octavius made a device that will make them safer as Peter states that she was asking about Richard. He states that he took the device in an attempt install it at Fisk Tower and that he might be enlisting Felicia Hardy to help him. Before Peter heads out, he is given a device from Otto that might help him. Peter and Mary Jane then tell Otto that they will take about what transpired later as May states that he should be better than he is. At Fisk Tower, Richard and Felicia enter it as they get through the different security systems. In Subterranea, Otto shows Ben Parker and J. Jonah Jameson a device that can enable them to get their information through for three bursts of 30 seconds before they can be tracked. As Spider-Man swings through New York, Ben unleashes the information that exposes Wilson Fisk. Kingpin is then confronted by Mister Negative who states that all of his Bullseyes are occupied. The Bullseyes are then given orders to let them through. Their dispute is then disrupted by Richard and Felicia accidentally setting off the security systems. Spider-Man then crashes their dispute as Negative reveals that James Wesley was a Mysterio and told him everything about Peter, Richard, and Kingpin. This forces Kingpin and Negative into a truce as Spider-Man fights them while Richard and Felicia fight their way through the security system. Green Goblin and the Mysterio Conglomerate are brought to Henri Duggary as Green Goblin is unable to help them. Back in Subterranea, Ben Parker move on to the next phase. Kingpin subdues Spider-Man, though he gets back up.

As Richard and Felicia fight their way through the security systems and Green Goblin and the Mysterio Conglomerate confront Henri Duggary, Spider-Man webs up Mister Negative and sends him face first into Kingpin's fist. Meanwhile, Richard and Felicia struggle against the security systems. The defense matrix gets into the Picotech armor's code and assumes a similar form. Richard gets into the defense matrix's controls and shuts it down. Spider-Man arrives and finds Richard and Felicia kissing. As Negative gets to his feet, Green Goblin sees the Mysterio Conglomerate shaking hands with Henri. Later as protests gather outside of Fisk Tower, Negative tells Kingpin that they have both lost as Kingpin states that Duggary has given control of New York City over to Mysterio. Negative makes Kingpin leap to his death, but Kingpin takes Negative off the building with him, resulting in both of them dying. Later that day, Harry tells Peter that he will have Octavius wipe the Norman Osborn A.I. from the Green Goblin's armor. In a flashback 15 years ago, MJ reveals to Peter that she's pregnant. Determined to help her, Peter asks MJ to marry him. As the Parkers return home with Peter revealing that Otto helped clean up the mess and Richard reveals that Felicia will help out with rent once he's done being grounded. Peter tells MJ that for years he felt something was missing from his life but realizes everything he wanted was in front of him all along.

== Characters ==
=== Main characters ===
- Peter Parker / Spider-Man: This iteration of Peter Parker from Earth-6160 was meant to be bitten by a radioactive spider at his teens, and become the Amazing Spider-Man. However, the Maker caught that spider, as Peter grew up happy and healthy, raised by his Aunt May and Uncle Ben in the wake of his parents' death. He married MJ Watson and had two kids with her, named Richard and May. However, Peter's life takes a turn at the age of 35 when he receives a package and message from Tony Stark. He learns of the destiny that was taken away from him, and feels that he's not who he should be. After some (unknowing) words of encouragement from Uncle Ben and MJ, Peter allows the spider to bite him as always intended, and becomes Spider-Man.
  - Pico Parker: The Oscorp-made picotech suit provided to Peter by Tony Stark, whose A.I. unwittingly copies the mind of Peter, becoming a second Peter, who covers for him when missing and trains Richard as the second Spider-Man.
- Mary Jane "MJ" Watson-Parker: MJ is the wife of Peter Parker and the mother of Richard and May Parker. MJ used to be a model and began handling her own branding. People liked what she was doing, which led to her being hired by Bayham-Laroche and subsequently poached by Smith and Altmann's executive suite. At an unspecified time, she quit her job and started her own marketing firm.
- Richard Parker II / Venom: Richard Parker is the 15-year-old son of Peter Parker and MJ Watson and the older brother of May Parker. He inherits the picotech suit soon after Peter disappears in issue twelve and later adopts the name Venom.
- May Parker II: May Parker is the daughter of Peter Parker and MJ Watson and the younger sister of Richard Parker. She is the first to discover Peter's true identity, and is the one to suggest the red and blue suit.
- Harry Osborn / Green Goblin: Harry Osborn was the son of former Oscorp Industries CEO Norman Osborn and his wife Emily, and is currently married to Gwen Stacy. He becomes the vigilante Green Goblin after the deaths of his parents, having an A.I. modeled after his father Norman, to operate his suit. Harry is apparently killed by Kraven the Hunter. It turned out that his death has been faked by Gwen so that Harry can still operate as Green Goblin with his identity not being at risk.

=== Supporting characters ===
- Ben Parker: In the Ultimate Universe, Ben Parker and his wife May took custody of their fifteen-year-old nephew, Peter. Although still heartbroken by the tragedy, the couple raised Peter with unconditional love and affection. Due to the changes that the Maker, a time traveler from another universe, altered the history of Ben's world, instead of dying at the hands of a burglar which would led his nephew into an inspiring journey of being the superhero Spider-Man, Ben lived with his wife and watched Peter grow into adulthood, become a husband and then a father. Ben eventually became the managing editor of Wilson Fisk's Manhattan newspaper, The Daily Bugle, where he worked and developed a close friendship with J. Jonah Jameson. However, Ben quit the Bugle alongside Jonah once Fisk decided to make changes to the company that conflicted with his ethics.
- J. Jonah Jameson: A newspaper editor and good friend of Ben Parker. He helps begin The Paper alongside Ben after they leave the Daily Bugle.
- Gwen Stacy-Osborn / Mysterio: Gwen Stacy is the wife of Harry Osborn and CEO of the North American Union corporation Oscorp Industries. She is later revealed to be a member of the Mysterio where she infiltrated the Sinister Six led by the Kingpin, taking Brooklyn as her territory. She faked Harry's death with her illusion so that he can continue operating as Green Goblin and take the fight to Kingpin.
- Otto Octavius / Superior Spider-Man: Dr. Otto Octavius was an employee of Oscorp Industries, bound by a non-disclosure agreement. After the sale of Stane/Stark Industries to Oscorp Co-CEO Harry Osborn and Gwen Stacy-Osborn by philanthropist Wilson Fisk, Octavius provided assistance to the couple in their research of their acquisition. This ultimately led them to an off-the-books room, which was powered entirely by an Arc Reactor, previously utilized by Howard Stark to store his Iron Man Armor. He is designed after the Earth-616 Otto's "Elliot Tolliver" clone form. After Gwen is informed by Quentin Beck that Harry had Otto keep an eye on her and taking Quentin's advice, she fires Otto. Otto continued to help out Spider-Man and Green Goblin while also making his own Spider-Man outfit that made him feel superior.

=== Antagonists ===
- Wilson Fisk / Kingpin: A follower of the Maker's Council who controls Manhattan as its appointed "Shadow Governor" while answering to Henri Duggary. Fisk owns several businesses such as The Daily Bugle. Green Goblin claims to Spider-Man that there might be a chance that some of the police officers in New York City are secretly on Fisk's side.
- Herman Schultz / Shocker: The Shocker was a vibro-gauntlet wielding bank robber from the city of New York in the North American Union. He came into possession of his gauntlets after breaking into the apartment of a man who seemingly died of a heart attack after receiving a package from Tony Stark containing a holographic message and the gauntlets themselves. Though he fooled Spider-Man with his gullibility, Shocker was later defeated by Green Goblin.
- Bullseye: He is one of the Bullseye assassins who serves Kingpin and are devoted to Henri Duggary.
- Martin Li / Mister Negative: He is the CEO of F.E.A.S.T. Foundation, though in actuality he is the leader of a gang known as the Demons. Li joins the Sinister Six as a lieutenant of Wilson Fisk where he operates in Queens.
- Sergei Kravinoff / Kraven the Hunter: A billionaire oligarch who was among those exiled from the Eurasian Republic with his family during the "Rasputin Purge". Sergei is a hunter born of a long line of hunters and, as such, he has hunted and killed everything that can be, always hunting in pairs, killing one and saving the other. As time went on, he eventually arrived at Staten Island in the North American Union where he met Wilson Fisk and joined his Sinister Six, taking Staten Island as his territory. Kraven owns a zoo that serves as his lair and where he displays his hunting trophies to the public. After being fooled by Mysterio that he killed Harry Osborn, Kraven the Hunter was shot in the head by Mysterio.
- Walter Hardy / Black Cat: An infamous thief and one of Fisk's lieutenants, who controls the Bronx until the Green Goblin pushed him out of a roof that left him paralyzed during a fight between him and Spider-Man. While recuperating in a wheelchair, Walter's daughter Felicia takes the mantle of the Black Cat and replaces him as a member of the Sinister Six.
- Harvey Elder / Mole Man: The oldest and most loyal of Fisk's lieutenants who rules a secret borough beneath New York known as The Underground.
- Felicia Hardy / Black Cat: Felicia Hardy is the 16-year-old daughter of Walter Hardy, secretly known as the Black Cat, the greatest top-floor thief in the world, and Lydia Hardy. Her mother died, leaving Felicia and her father behind. She becomes the new Black Cat after her father was injured by Green Goblin and joins the Sinister Six, eventually befriending Richard Parker II.
- Hammerhead - A criminal who was defeated by Spider-Man and Green Goblin.
- Vermin - A rat-like criminal who was defeated by Spider-Man and Green Goblin.

=== The Mysterio ===
The Mysterio are a secret group of Mysterios that are aware of the changes that Maker has done. They derive their powers from a magical amulet. Besides Gwen Stacy, the following make up the Mysterio:

- Quentin Beck: The leader of the Mysterio who was in the midst of passing his amulet to Gwen when he suddenly retires.
- Robbie Robertson: A worker at the Daily Bugle who secretly helps Ben Parker and J. Jonah Jameson. He is revealed to be a member of the Mysterio.
- James Wesley: Kingpin's personal assistant. He is revealed to be a member of the Mysterio.
- George Stacy: The father of Gwen Stacy. He was revealed to have been a member of the Mysterio prior to his death.
- Aihan: The sister of Mister Negative.

=== Minor characters ===
- Henri Duggary / Captain Britain: Henri Dugarry was a French nobleman, descending from Louis XIV, and the wielder of both the Sword of Might and the Amulet of Right. In addition of granting him the mantle of this reality's Captain Britain, they gave him providence over the entirety of the European Coalition, which was one of the seven sovereign bodies whose combined power governed the entire world. In turn, Dugarry was part of a secret council of world leaders under the leadership of the world's imperator, the Maker, who orchestrated geopolitical conflicts and alliances to rally their citizens together under a common cause. A few months later, Henri held a meeting with his North American Union subordinate Wilson Fisk to discuss the presence of two vigilantes in Manhattan: one, a web-swinging man dressed in all black, and the other, a green-armored assailant pursuing Fisk. Duggary questioned Fisk's strategy of using the media to blind the public, and suggested he use the resources he and his associates had provided.
- Gayle Watson: Gayle Watson was the daughter of Madeline Watson and sister of MJ Watson. Gayle used to said to her sister that she was lucky to have her, but not in a nice way. After MJ married Peter Parker, Gayle told her that she was wasting her life and that having children would only make her mistakes permanent. Gayle and MJ stopped talking for years, despite this, she invited her every year to her family Christmas party, but Gayle never assisted. Gayle married a man named Douglas. However, he had an affair for several years and after Gayle found out, she decided to divorce him.
- Madeline Watson: Madeline Watson was the mother of MJ and Gayle Watson. Madeline married three times, having divorced and widowed. She is a world traveler.
- Matthew Murdock: Due to the changes of time in Earth-6160 by The Maker, Matthew Murdock is a seemingly normal blind priest. Murdock was present at the memorial for the victims of a terrorist attack on the city of New York, speaking to those affected before relinquishing his position to Harry Osborn to deliver a speech of his own.
- Tony Stark / Iron Lad: The son of the infamous Howard Stark and the leader of The Ultimates, Iron Lad sent various "origin boxes" in order to restored the population of superheroes and take the world back from the Maker and his council, several months after Stark gave Peter Parker an origin box that would turn him into Spider-Man, the latter visited him to see if he has become a successful hero. He later left stating to Spider-Man and Green Goblin that he will need their aid later.
- William Baker / Sandman: A man who was captured by A.I.M. when he stumbled upon their facility where illegal experiments are performed and gained sand-based abilities from one of those experiments.

=== Organizations ===
- Daily Bugle: The Daily Bugle is a newspaper company owned by Wilson Fisk, it is used as a conspiracy machine that gives him a great deal of influence over the city though he still has to answer to his higher-ups.
- The Paper: The independent newspaper company that Ben Parker and J. Jonah Jameson found in order to write articles regarding the events happening in New York City after both resigned the Daily Bugle. At the advice of Harry Osborn, Jameson and Ben wrote the first story using the alias of "Ben Reilly".
- Sinister Six: With his criminal empire being threatened by the emergence of vigilantes Spider-Man and Green Goblin, Wilson Fisk has brought together five of his best and most dangerous lieutenants to eliminate this threat. Kingpin's lieutenants are Mister Negative who rules Queens, the first Black Cat who runs the Bronx, Kraven the Hunter who runs Staten Island, the illusionist Mysterio who runs Brooklyn, the Underground's leader Mole Man, and Fisk himself meet to come up with a plan against the vigilantes.
- Bullseyes: The Bullseyes are a marksman assassin group employed by the Maker's Council to eliminate individuals they considered a threat to their objectives. They are devoted to Duggary, even taking out their left eyes when he lost his in a struggle between him and Stark. One Bullseye was defeated and held captive in Green Goblin's lair since there might be a chance that most of the police officers in New York City are secretly on Fisk's side.
- Inner Demons: The Inner Demons are Mister Negative's gang.
- Oscorp Industries: A North American Union corporation previously owned by billionaire Norman Osborn before his death, Gwen Stacy is the current CEO of the company while her husband and the son of her father-in-law, Harry Osborn, uses the technology from Oscorp and Stane/Stark Industries to build his Green Goblin armor, weapons and glider.

== Collected editions ==
Following its release in September 2024, Ultimate Spider-Man Vol. 1: Married With Children entered ICv2's monthly graphic novel chart at number one. It remained top of the chart in October, and only slipped to second place in November. It finished the year as the third bestselling graphic novel of 2024, despite only being on sale for four months.

#	Title	Material collected	Format	Pages	Released	ISBN
1	Married With Children	Ultimate Spider-Man (2024) #1–6	TPB	168	September 10, 2024	978-1302957292
2	The Paper	Ultimate Spider-Man (2024) #7–12	TPB	136	March 18, 2025	978-1302958282
3	Family Business	Ultimate Spider-Man (2024) #13–18	TPB	136	September 23, 2025	978-1302958299
4	One Last Day	Ultimate Spider-Man (2024) #19–24, Ultimate Universe Finale #1 (Spider-Man story)	TPB	136	July 21, 2026	978-1302958305

== Reception ==
Ultimate Spider-Man #1 sold out three times in just two months. If sales for the comics with the standard cover and alternate covers are taken separately, it got 8 places in the top 10 most sold comics. Critics and fans praised the art and story, and compared it favorably to the main Spider-Man comics, which some felt had grown stagnant following the decision to end Peter and MJ's marriage in the Marvel-616 universe in "One More Day". Those sales are higher than those of Ultimate Invasion and the Ultimate Universe one-shot published before it. Ultimate Spider-Man outsold the Spider-Man comics from the main continuity for 11 of the 12 months within the first year of release (failing only to do so in July 2024).

== See also ==
- Spider-Man storylines
- Spider-Man collected editions
- Daredevil collected editions
- Marvel Omnibus
- Marvel Gallery Editions
- Marvel Epic Collections
