= Bryan Edward Hill =

American writer and graphic designer

Brian Edward Hill is an American author, screenwriter, musician, comic book writer, and graphic designer.

== Early life and education ==
Hill was born in Chicago and moved to St. Louis, Missouri as a child, where he attended the prep academy John Burroughs School.

== Career ==
Hill was hired by Top Cow Productions to expand the Witchblade universe by writing the trade paperback Broken Trinity: Pandora's Box with former Top Cow Productions editor Rob Levin. Hill later wrote the book 7 Days from Hell for Top Cow Productions, and was later hired to adapt it into a screenplay. He also co-wrote Netherworld, a comic book, for Heroes and Villains. He co-wrote the comic book Postal with Matt Hawkins, which began publication in 2015. He began writing it by himself at issue #12.

In 2013, Hill began work on several feature screenplays, including the action-thriller Gone, sold to Universal Studios. He wrote the screen adaptation of the video game series Just Cause 2 (Square Enix). He has since worked on series such as Ash vs Evil Dead and Titans.

On June 27, 2018, Hill took over as writer for Detective Comics, for the DC character Batman, for a five issue arc titled On the Outside. This arc set up for a new volume of Batman and the Outsiders written by Hill, released in December 2018, starring Batman, Katana, Black Lightning, Cassandra Cain, and Duke Thomas.

In 2019, he began working with Marvel on a Killmonger miniseries.

In 2024, he began to write Ultimate Black Panther with art by Stefano Caselli.

== Bibliography ==
=== DC Comics ===
- American Carnage #1-9 (2018−2019)
- Batman and the Outsiders #1-11, Annual #1 (2019–2020)
- Black Lightning / Hong Kong Phooey Special (2018)
- Dark Nights: Death Metal - Rise of the New God (2020)
- Detective Comics #983-987 (2018)
- The Power Company: Recharged #1 (2025)
- The Wild Storm: Michael Cray #1-12 (2017–2018)
- Wonder Woman: Agent of Peace #19 (2020)

=== Marvel Comics ===
- Alien: Black, White & Blood #4 (2024)
- Black Panther:
  - Ultimate Black Panther #1−24 (2024−2026)
  - Black Panther: Unconquered (2022)
  - Killmonger #1-5 (2018−2019)
- Blade:
  - Blade #1-10 (2023–2024)
  - Blade: First Bite Infinity Comic #1-4 (2023)
  - Blade: Red Band #1-5 (2024−2025)
- Fallen Angels #1-6 (2019–2020)
- Midnight Sons: Blood Hunt #1-3 (2024)
- Miles Morales: Spider-Man (2026–present)
- Ultimate Universe Finale (2026)
- Spider-Man Annual #1 (2018)
- War of the Realms Strikeforce: The Dark Elf Realm #1 (2019)
- What If? X-Men #1 (2018)

=== Other Companies ===
==== BOOM! Studios ====
- Angel #0-8 (2019)
- Angel + Spike #9-10, 12-14 (2020)

==== Dark Horse Comics ====
- Far Cry: Rite of Passage #1-3 (2021)

==== Image Comics ====
- Aphrodite V #1-4 (2018)
- Bonehead #1-5 (2017–2018)
- Broken Trinity: Aftermath (2009)
- Broken Trinity: Pandora's Box #1, 4-6 (2010)
- Cyber Force #1-11 (2018−2019)
- Eden's Fall #1-3 (2016)
- Netherworld #1-5 (2012)
- Postal #1-25 (2015−2018)
- Postal: Deliverance #1-8 (2019–2020)

== Screenwriting credits ==
=== Feature film ===
- The Mechanik (2005)
- The Legend of Muay Thai: 9 Satra (2018)
- Zone 414 (2021)

=== Television ===
- Ash vs Evil Dead (2018)
  - Episode: "Rifting Apart"
- Titans (2018–2023)
  - Episode: "Together"
  - Episode: "Asylum"
  - Episode: "Bruce Wayne"
  - Episode: "Lazarus"
  - Episode: "Prodigal"
  - Episode: "Mother Mayhem"
  - Episode: "Game Over"
- Cannon Busters (2019)
  - Episode: "Lady & The Kid"
