= Latveria =

Fictional country in Marvel Comics

Coordinates: 46°04′14.6″N 20°35′17.3″E

- Marvel Comics location
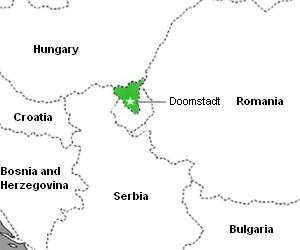
- A rendition of the nation of Latveria (in green) and its capital Doomstadt. Symkaria borders along the south.

- Flag of Latveria
- First appearance: The Fantastic Four Annual #2 (July 1964)
- Created by: Stan Lee; Jack Kirby

In-universe information
- Type: Autocracy
- Ruled by: Doctor Doom
- Location: Europe
- Locations: Doomstadt (capital)
- Characters: Doctor Doom; Lucia von Bardas; Dreadknight
- Currency: Latverian Franc

Latveria is a fictional country appearing in American comic books published by Marvel Comics. It is depicted within the storylines of Marvel's comic titles as a small, isolated European country ruled by the fictional Supreme Lord Doctor Doom, supposedly located in the Banat region. It is surrounded by the Carpathian Mountains, and also borders fictional Symkaria (home of Silver Sable) to the south. Its capital is Doomstadt.

== Publication history ==
Latveria first appeared in Fantastic Four Annual #2, which was published in 1964. Victor von Doom is the ruler of Latveria. Though he has been dethroned a number of times, Doom has invariably managed to return to the throne of his country within a matter of months.

== History ==
Located in Southeastern Europe, Latveria was formed out of land annexed from southern Hungary centuries before, and possibly land from Serbia.

Doom's style of rule can best be described as an absolute monarchy, as it was revealed that there is no legislature. Doom has devices throughout Latveria to watch his people and even has hidden weapons to prevent them leaving without his consent.

=== Country-wide disasters ===
S.H.I.E.L.D., under the leadership of Iron Man and the Avengers, invades Latveria after discovering Doom's unintentional involvement in the release of a symbiote virus on New York. Latveria is devastated, while Doom is taken into custody for crimes against humanity.

Doom is released from prison due to the influence of Norman Osborn. He restores Latveria with the use of his time travel technology.

=== Economy ===
Much of Latveria's economy depends on Doctor Doom's high-tech inventions. The country's official currency is the "Latverian Franc" – because Doom refuses to join the European Union or adopt the Euro. The Latverian Franc is still considered to be reasonably strong against the United States Dollar.

== Known inhabitants ==
- Doctor Doom – The current Supreme ruler of Latveria.
- Alexander Flynn – The alleged mutant son of Doctor Doom and an unidentified Romani woman.
- Seven Daggers of Latveria – A group of Latverian mutants who are loyal to Doctor Doom.
- Lucia von Bardas – The Prime Minister of Latveria.

== Other versions ==
=== King Loki ===
In the future depicted in Loki: Agent of Asgard, Doctor Doom discovers Latveria completely destroyed after King Loki destroyed the Earth. Doom attempts to prevent this future by imprisoning the Loki of the present.

=== Marvel 2099 ===
In the alternate future called "Marvel 2099", various power struggles over the fate of Latveria end with most of the country's population destroyed by chemical weapons known as "necrotoxins".

=== Ultimate Universe ===
In Earth-6160, a world marked by alternate history due to the interference of the Maker, Latveria is used as his seat of political power, creating a world government under his control.

== In other media ==
=== Television ===
- Latveria appears in Fantastic Four (1994).
- Latveria appears in The Super Hero Squad Show episode "Pedicure of Doom!".
- Latveria appears in The Avengers: Earth's Mightiest Heroes episode "The Private War of Doctor Doom".
- Latveria appears in Ultimate Spider-Man.
- Latveria appears in Avengers Assemble.
- Latveria appears in Hulk and the Agents of S.M.A.S.H.

=== Film ===
- Latveria appears in Fantastic Four: Rise of the Silver Surfer. This version is not led by Doctor Doom; as a result, the country's capital was renamed from Doomstadt to Hassenstadt.
- Latveria is mentioned in The Fantastic Four: First Steps, during the Future Foundational summit through the country’s nameplate and an empty chair.
- Latveria will appear in Avengers: Doomsday.

=== Video games ===
- Latveria appears in Ultimate Spider-Man (2005).
- Castle Doom appears as a level in Marvel: Ultimate Alliance.
- The Latverian embassy appears in The Incredible Hulk.
- Latveria appears in Marvel: Ultimate Alliance 2.
- The Latverian embassy appears in Marvel: Avengers Alliance.
- Castle Doom appears as a level in Lego Marvel Super Heroes.
- Latveria appears as a level in Marvel Heroes.

=== Miscellaneous ===
Latveria appears in the Spider-Man newspaper strip.

== Reception ==
Bustle published a humorous article about how to convince people that Latveria is a real place, saying "Latveria doesn't sound made up [...] in this case, Latveria is very much fake — which doesn't mean you can't still have fun convincing people it's real, though."

Screen Rant writes that ever since The Fantastic Four #5 was published in 1962, "the tiny country of Latveria has long been a thorn in the side of Marvel's heroes", noting that it was long established as a country located in Southeastern Europe, and as of 2020 its location was firmly identified as the Banat region, so that "This fixed location for Latveria grounds the nation more fully in readers' understanding of the real world, suggesting realistic political tensions and even geographical factors which can play into future stories."

Mark Hibbett of Central Saint Martins notes that Latveria in 1964 was described as a small country in East Europe "nestling in the heart of the Bavarian alps", and he explains that "Right from the start Latveria is presented as a very strange place, like a fairy tale village transplanted into the real world, with Jack Kirby's illustrations showing an almost medieval world of peasant cottages and gypsy caravans."
