= Maker (character) =

Marvel Comics supervillain

- The Maker taken from the variant cover of Ultimate Endgame #1 (December 2025). Art by Derrick Chew.

Publication information
- Publisher: Marvel Comics
- First appearance: Ultimate Fantastic Four #1 (Feb. 2004; as Reed Richards); Ultimate Fallout #4 (Aug. 2011; as Maker)
- Created by: Brian Michael Bendis; Mark Millar; Adam Kubert (based upon the original character by Stan Lee and Jack Kirby)

In-story information
- Alter ego: Reed Nathaniel Richards
- Species: Human mutate
- Team affiliations: W.H.I.S.P.E.R. Fantastic Four (Ultimate Marvel version); Children of Tomorrow; Dark Ultimates
- Notable aliases: Mister Fantastic
- Abilities: Genius-level intellect; Exceptional engineer, physicist, biologist, and chemist; Superhuman elasticity, malleability, and durability; Immortality

The Maker (previously Mister Fantastic, also known as Ultimate Reed Richards) is a supervillain appearing in American comic books published by Marvel Comics. The character was created by writers Brian Michael Bendis and Mark Millar and artist Adam Kubert, while his Maker identity was created by Jonathan Hickman.

He is Ultimate Marvel's (Earth-1610) version of Mister Fantastic, initially presented as a heroic, morally altruistic and scientifically driven superhero and a younger, modernized alternate version of Reed Richards, who later turns into the villainous Maker, after enduring a series of tragedies and immense mental trauma; he eventually becomes part of the regular Marvel Universe, serving as an enemy and evil foil to his parallel universe counterpart, the New Avengers, and Eddie Brock/Venom, serving as an example of what his Earth-616 counterpart could have been had he used his powers and intellect for malice. However, during the "Absolute Carnage" and "King in Black" storylines, the Maker revealed he had been coordinating with the Council of Reeds (a group of other alternate counterparts of Mister Fantastic) and had utilized the many Symbiote Codexes he had extracted from the various heroes and villains who had been previous hosts as a means to repeat his long-standing goal: restoring his native dimension (not knowing that it has already been restored as revealed during the events of Spider-Men II storyline), which he sets out to enact in the 2023 miniseries Ultimate Invasion, resulting in the creation of the new Ultimate Universe after altering the timeline of another universe.

== Publication history ==
Ultimate Reed Richards bears a resemblance to his Earth-616 counterpart; however, he differs in many aspects: the origin of his powers is different and he is much younger. The character was created by Brian Michael Bendis, Mark Millar and Adam Kubert, and debuted in 2004 in Ultimate Fantastic Four.

In 2011, the character started calling himself the Maker and became a nemesis to the Ultimates. This identity was created by Jonathan Hickman.

After the "Secret Wars" storyline destroyed the Ultimate Universe (Earth-1610) and restored the Multiverse, the Maker moved to the post-Secret Wars Marvel Universe in 2015.

== Fictional character biography ==
Born in the suburbs of New York City, Reed Richards was a brilliant, intellectually-gifted and knowledgeable, but socially-withdrawn, shy and reserved, scientific child genius, who possessed a high IQ level of 267 and held a deep-rooted love and passion for science, being well-versed in various fields of scientific topics, such as astrophysics, chemistry, biology, quantum mathematics, mechanical and electrical engineering, advanced chemistry and robotics and was the brightest student in school. However, due to his bookish and introverted personality, he was regularly picked on and tormented by bullies, while also receiving similar treatment from his father, who despised his son for his non-masculine and studious nature. However, as a result of demonstrating a teleporter at a school science fair, Reed was later recruited for a government think-tank sponsoring intellectually-gifted youngsters and child polymaths, similar to Reed.

Reed conducts his research, along with several other students including Victor Van Damme, at a facility located in the Baxter Building in Manhattan, where he meets Johnny Storm and Sue Storm, the latter of whom Reed becomes smitten and romantically involved. During the final experimentation phase of his research, Reed was visited by Ben Grimm, his best and only friend since childhood, who protected him from bullies during his years in school. At the age of 21, Reed, along with other scientists, attempted to teleport organic material through an alternate plane of existence called the N-Zone, with Sue assisting him and Johnny and Ben observing the demonstration. The experiment goes awry due to Victor secretly changing the coordinates of the teleporter at the last minute, resulting in the four being engulfed in a parallel dimension termed as the "N-Zone" and grants the four with super-powers, with Reed being able to stretch his body parts to incredible lengths and is endowed with enhanced durability. They have a series of adventures and encounters with a number of super-human and extraterrestrial threats, during the four's attempts to solve the mystery behind the source of their new-found powers and turn Reed and Ben back to normal. The four are later exposed to the media and public, who name the group as: "The Fantastic Four", with Reed undertaking the alias of "Mr. Fantastic" and embarking on numerous adventures and conflicts against inter-dimensional adversaries and super-human enemies. Throughout the series, Reed's personality remains largely similar to his Earth-616 counterpart, being well-meaning and altruistic.

After the Ultimatum miniseries resulted in the death of many heroes, Reed attempts to propose to Sue during Franklin Storm's funeral but she breaks up with him and the Fantastic Four is disbanded. Reed is later seen working with aliens to pillage the artifacts stored at Project Pegasus. It becomes clear that Reed's worldview has changed to a more sinister outlook, as a result of the mental and emotional trauma endured from the Ultimatum coupled with Sue's rejection and breakup. In Ultimate Enemy, he is shown to be living with his parents again before an explosion seemingly kills them. In Ultimate Mystery, Reed is revealed to have orchestrated his family's murders and faked his own death, before allying himself with the attacking aliens. Ultimate Doomsday sees Reed confronted by his former teammates, as well as Spider-Man, Mahr Vehl, and the Ultimates. As the story unfolds, it becomes clear to his former friends that Reed is a threat to the world. Part of his motivation to become a villain is that he no longer likes his home dimension and wishes he could find another world to improve.

In Ultimate Fallout, Reed is revealed to have survived his defeat and is shown trapped in the Negative Zone. He soon escapes and returns to his world, where he vows to win back his friends by saving the planet. In Ultimate Comics: The Ultimates, Reed is revealed to be the Maker, creator of the City and leader of the Children of Tomorrow, a race of genetically engineered superhumans. He has come back to fight against the Ultimates after spending 1,000 years in the distant future, having been unable to age due to his powers.

When the primary Galactus arrives in the Ultimate Universe due to a temporal distortion, the Ultimates are forced to approach Reed for help after Mysterio (who was trapped in the Ultimate universe) identifies Galactus and reveals that he has been defeated by Earth-616's Reed Richards in the past. Accompanied by the new Spider-Man, Reed travels to Earth-616 to access his counterpart's files. Before he departs, he and Miles are confronted by Valeria Richards, leaving Reed shaken as he witnesses the family he and Sue could have had. Based on his counterpart's files on Galactus, Reed defeats him by sending him to the Negative Zone, where he can starve to death due to the Negative Zone consisting entirely of anti-matter and thus providing nothing for Galactus to consume.

=== Secret Wars ===
Nick Fury secretly recruits Reed to help draft counter-measures to doomsday scenarios, where he eventually starts having to fight Incursions. While working on stopping another, he finds the Cabal escaping from another destroyed Earth. Following the final incursion, Reed and the Cabal escape the destruction of Earth-1610 in a "life-raft" created for that purpose. Learning that they are on a new world ruled by God Emperor Doom using the power of the Beyonders and Molecule Man, Reed works with his Earth-616 counterpart to devise a means of defeating Doom. However, they are divided due to their morals, as Reed wishes to kill their enemy while 616-Reed is more concerned with ensuring that the world can survive without him. After they find Molecule Man, the Maker attempts to eliminate 616-Reed by devolving his counterpart into a monkey. However, Molecule Man intervenes, returning Reed to normal while turning the Maker into a pizza.

=== New Avengers ===
Despite this, the Maker survives and was split into an infinite number of beings by the Molecule Man, who placed one version of the Maker in each of the newly formed universes being created by his Earth-616 counterpart and Franklin Richards. Each of these versions shares the same consciousness, allowing them to operate independently. He then emerged in the new Prime Earth, where he takes over the science-based terrorist organization W.H.I.S.P.E.R. to continue experimenting for his own gain. His first experiment focuses on harnessing the souls of the dead to try and capture the souls of previous universes. Maker also assembles a new incarnation of the Revengers called the New Revengers, with plans to have them face the New Avengers. They consist of Asti the All-Seeing, Paibok, Vermin, White Tiger, and alternate versions of Angar the Screamer and Skar.

Donning a variation of the Rescue armor, Toni Ho manages to kill Skar. The remaining members of the New Revengers face off against the New Avengers and A.I.M. While the remaining members of the New Revengers are defeated, Maker escapes. Sunspot later confronts Maker aboard fake Air Force One and defeats him. Sunspot then delivers Maker to the government, who imprison him in a special cell.

=== Working with Project Oversight ===
Maker later appears as a member of Project Oversight. He was seen interrogating Eddie Brock about the incident revolving around the Grendel symbiote and Knull while stating that he is not the Mister Fantastic whom Brock knows. In addition, he discusses how the Venom symbiote has lost its personality, acting akin to a dog. When Brock asks Maker if he can restore Venom to its normal behavior, Maker states that the only way to do so would be to connect Venom to the symbiote hive mind. Venom retaliates and traps Maker in a morgue locker, though he manages to escape.

The Maker probes the living darkness cocooning Eddie Brock's body until Venom's tendrils constrict him. Eddie tells Maker that he has to go after his son Dylan Brock, but Maker states that Dylan will be fine. Maker shows concern that Eddie will not survive long being forcefully separated from Venom. Venom is successfully removed from Eddie, but incapacitates both him and Maker.

Eventually, Maker bonds with the Venom symbiote from Earth-1610, but is attacked by a symbiote named Virus and returned to his universe. He is pleased to see his Earth's New York in ruins.

=== Relocating to Earth-6160 ===
During the "Ultimate Invasion" storyline, the Maker took control of the body at the Blaakguard Building, escapes from it, and travels to another universe, shaping its history to his liking and preventing the creation of many superheroes. He establishes a version of the City in Latveria and creates a new world order ruled by himself and his Council, using the organization H.A.N.D as a secret police to enforce his laws.

The Maker attempts to enlist the help of Howard Stark in order to create the Immortus Engine. However, Stark rebels, trapping the Maker inside the City for two years after realizing his true intentions and personality. The Maker's Council is forced to deal with the resulting fallout during his absence while awaiting his return.

In the "Ultimate Endgame" storyline, the City opens and the Maker begins a large-scale assault on the Ultimates. Iron Lad, Spider-Man, Doom, and America Chavez are saved by a group of Deathloks and brought to Immortus, who Iron Lad claims to be an aged Howard Stark. Immortus denies any memory of this and informs them that Maker has made the City an extension of himself.

The Maker is eventually defeated by the sacrifice of Earth 6160's native Reed Richards, in his role as the masked hero Doom. The last sliver of his essence is captured by the Earth-6160 version of Victor von Doom.

== Powers and abilities ==
Reed Richards has the power of elasticity. He can stretch his eyes, specifically the lens, so that he does not need his glasses or any other visual augmentation, but can only sustain this for short periods. It is revealed that his abilities allow him to stretch his brain in order to accommodate and solve almost any problem, thus making him effectively a human computer, so Reed is a genius with an IQ of at least 267 at age 16.

Reed experiences an increase in his intellect from the accident that empowered him, making his "mind as flexible as his body". He has shown a reduced need for sleep due to the hyper-efficient workings of his brain. Reed's body has been radically transformed, his only internal organ being a "bacterial stack" that generates energy to fuel his body. This obviates the need to explain, for example, how his circulatory system can pump his blood when his body is stretched the length of a football field; he simply has none. Lacking a digestive system, he has no need to eat or drink. Similarly, because he has no lungs, Reed does not need to breathe in any conventional human sense and can survive in environments lacking oxygen.

The Maker is able to split himself into multiple sentient beings that can operate separately from one another. Following the Secret Wars, the Maker was split into an infinite number of beings by Molecule Man, who placed one version of the Maker in each universe. Each of these versions shares the same consciousness, allowing them to operate independently. This also enables him to teleport by switching between different versions of himself from different universes, and to transport weapons from other universes, which makes it difficult to disarm him.

== Other versions ==
During the "Eternity War" arc, an alternate version of the Maker (sharing the same consciousness as the one imprisoned by the New Avengers) arrives on Counter-Earth to collaborate with High Evolutionary to "evolve the entire multiverse". The Maker uses the High Evolutionary's machinery to destroy the Superflow that keeps the different universes separate, merging them into one reality to help Eternity fight the First Firmament.

In What If...? Secret Wars the Maker successfully killed his Earth-616 counterpart and God Emperor Doom, gaining the powers of the Beyonder in the process. In contrast to his Earth-616 counterpart, he is still determined to create the perfect world and rather than recreating the multiverse as it was, instead creates new worlds using his own as a base reference. Because of this, he is unable to return the displaced Earth-616 Peter Parker to his world, as the main Marvel universe was capable of surviving with superhumans for a long period of time while the Ultimate universe cannot.

== In other media ==
- The Ultimate Marvel version's costume appears as an alternate skin for Mister Fantastic in Marvel: Ultimate Alliance, Marvel: Ultimate Alliance 2 and Fantastic Four: Rise of the Silver Surfer.
- The Maker's costume appears as an alternate skin for Mister Fantastic in Marvel: Future Fight, Marvel Super War, and Marvel Rivals.
- The Maker appears as a playable character in Marvel: Contest of Champions.
