= Zack Davisson =

American writer & translator (born 1972)

- Davisson at the 2026 Rose City Comic Con
- Born: August 15, 1972 (age 54); Anaheim, California, United States
- Education: University of Sheffield
- Occupations: Writer; editor; translator
- Spouse: Miyuki Davisson (Japanese: 美幸デービソン)
- Writing career
- Notable works: Yurei: The Japanese Ghost; The Ultimate Guide to Japanese Yokai; Kaibyo The Supernatural Cats of Japan; Ultimate X-Men; Showa: A History of Japan; Queen Emeraldas
- Notable awards: Eisner Award for Best Short Story (2026)
- Website: zackdavisson.com

Zack Davisson (born August 15, 1972) is an American writer, lecturer, and translator, especially known for translating the works of Shigeru Mizuki, Leiji Matsumoto, Go Nagai, Satoshi Kon, and Gou Tanabe. He is also well known for his works on Japanese folklore and ghosts.

Zack Davisson is on faculty at NYU in the Center for Publishing, Writing, and Media.

In 2015, Davisson wrote his first book, Yurei: The Japanese Ghost. Davisson went on to translate the works of Shigeru Mizuki, a popular Japanese manga artist and historian, into English. Davisson has cited Japanese writer Lafcadio Hearn as an inspiration on his work.

== Personal life ==
Davisson was born in Anaheim, California, but grew up in Spokane, Washington, where he attended University High School. He moved to Seattle where he attended Cornish College of the Arts. He moved to Japan on the JET Programme from 2001–2008 and did an MA in Japanese Studies from the University of Sheffield. He married his wife, Miyuki, in Osaka. He lives in Seattle, Washington.

== Career ==
Davisson started his career writing for Japanese magazines like Japanzine and Kansai Time-Out. His first professional translation was Mizuki's manga series Showa: A History of Japan. He ran a website, hyakumonogatari.com, where he published translated works on manga and Japanese horror legends. He has translated several manga series into English and has written for Smithsonian and The Comics Journal. He co-scripts Demon Days and Ultimate X-Men from Marvel comics with Peach Momoko.

He has lectured on manga, folklore, and translation at colleges such as Duke University, Annapolis Naval Academy, University Ca' Foscari di Venezia, UCLA, and the University of Washington and contributed to exhibitions at the Henry Art Gallery, the Museum of International Folkart, Wereldmuseum Rotterdam, and the Art Gallery of New South Wales.

== Selected works ==
=== Writing ===
- Yurei: The Japanese Ghost – Chin Music Press, 2014
- Kaibyo: The Supernatural Cats of Japan – Chin Music Press, 2017
- Yokai Stories – Chin Music Press, 2017
- The Art of Star Wars Visions – Dark Horse Comics, 2022
- Demon Days – Marvel Comics, 2022
- Edge of the Spider-verse – Marvel Comics, 2022
- Demon Wars – Marvel Comics, 2023
- Ultimate X-Men – Marvel Comics, 2024
- Mizuki: Facing Demons (Overwatch) – Blizzard Entertainment, 2026

=== Translations ===
- Showa: A History of Japan – Drawn and Quarterly, 2013
- Opus (manga) – Dark Horse, 2014
- Shigeru Mizuki's Hitler – Drawn and Quarterly, 2014
- Panty & Stocking with Garterbelt – Dark Horse Comics, 2015
- Queen Emeraldas – Kodansha, 2016
- Gegege no Kitaro – Drawn and Quarterly, 2016
- The Black Museum (manga) – Kodansha, 2016
- Captain Harlock: Dimensional Voyage – Seven Seas, 2017
- H.P.Lovecraft's THE HOUND and Other Stories – Dark Horse Comics, 2017
- Captain Harlock – Seven Seas, 2018
- Devilman – Seven Seas, 2018
- Cutie Honey – Seven Seas, 2018
- Space Battleship Yamato – Seven Seas, 2019
- Star Blazers: Space Battleship Yamato 2199 – Dark Horse Comics, 2019
- Cat + Gamer – Dark Horse Comics, 2022
- H.P. Lovecraft's THE COLOUR OUT OF SPACE – Dark Horse Comics, 2025
- H.P. Lovecraft's THE SHADOW OUT OF TIME – Dark Horse Comics, 2025
