= New Champions =

Comic book series

Publication information
- Publisher: Marvel Comics
- Schedule: Monthly
- Genre: Superhero
- Publication date: January-September 2025
- Main character: See below

Creative team
- Written by: Steve Foxe
- Artist(s): Ivan Fiorelli; Ig Guara

New Champions is an American superhero comic book series published by Marvel Comics that follows the team of teenage superheros of the same name. It was written by Steve Foxe and illustrated by Ivan Fiorelli.

== Publication history ==
Following Spider-Boy's success in headlining his comic series, Marvel Comics tasked its artist with creating more "sidekicks" for a variant cover program. This lineup of covers was announced under "New Champions Variant Covers" on July 12, 2023. In October 2023, these covers were released for their respective titles and teased younger counterparts of superheroes, including the cast of New Champions. In the 2023 one-shot Timeless, vol. 3 #1, many of these characters debuted in cameo appearance and were teased to join Earth-616 continuity. The Storm sidekick character Maystorm by Peach Momoko meanwhile appeared in the alternate universe series Ultimate X-Men (vol. 2) in 2024.

In July 2024, Marvel Comics editor-in-chief C. B. Cebulski presented promotional art for the comic series during San Diego Comic-Con. New Champions was officially announced on September 17, 2024, written by Steve Foxe and illustrated by Ivan Fiorelli. Foxe said that the cast was reverse-engineered from the covers and for him it was "unlike any other creative process he have ever been involved in." In December 2024, Foxe revealed that the series will be full of guest and recurring cast but these "core four" characters will remain centrally: Cadet Marvel, Hellrune, Liberty and Moon Squire. Foxe had written these four characters in Spider-Woman (vol. 8). He also stated that New Champions team will not be replacing Champions and teased the latter's appearance in the issue #3.

The publication of New Champions began in January 2025. In the same month, Gold Tiger was introduced; the character's design is a homage to Jack Kirby's unused Black Panther design.

In August 2025, Foxe confirmed that New Champions had been cancelled and that the series' eighth issue would be the last.

== Plot ==
The New Champions consists of Cadet Marvel, Hellrune, Liberty, and Moon Squire, who were formerly brainwashed by Hydra. (Note: As revealed in Spider-Woman Vol. 8 #10.) They arrived at the location where the Brothers Grimm were committing theft. They swiftly defeated the brothers, after which Hellrune teleported them back to their respective homes. While searching for her family, Hellrune travels to an island in Norway, only to discover it is a trap. The New Champions are teleported to the island after Hellrune summons them as zombie Vikings emerge. The team encounters Fantasma and reunites with Hellrune, witnessing a battle of several other superheroes fighting off zombie trolls. The New Champions realize that they, along with Fantasma, had been unintentionally summoned by Hellrune.

In the third issue, the New Champions butt heads with the previous Champions, whose name they took for their own new group. However, the two sides are forced to come together to defeat a common enemy. In the fourth issue, the origins of the New Champion member Gold Tiger are explored. In the fifth issue, Amaranth returns to aid the team and a romance between two of the characters begins. In the sixth issue, the New Champions meet the Avengers, who they have looked up to. In the seventh issue, the team responds to an S.O.S from Hellrune, which takes them all the way to London. They are introduced to Nightdrifter, who acts as their tour guide. In the eighth and final issue, the New Champions enter the land of the dead, and find that Hellrune wants to wake Hela, the goddess of death.

== Main characters ==
- Cadet Marvel (Emilio Gallardo): A teenage boy with super strength and the ability to fly.
- Fantasma (Isabella "Izzy" Alvarez): A Ghost Rider who likes roller derby.
- Hellrune: An orphaned magic user who was put into foster care after being freed from Hydra. Her name remains unrevealed.
- Liberty (Miranda Monteiro): A cyborg with cyberkinetic wings that allow her to fly, among other abilities.
- Moon Squire (Jaren Johnson): He has the ability to absorb light around him, effectively creating darkness. His suit is inspired by Moon Knight.
- Gold Tiger (Abena Adebayo): A Wakandan hero who can turn whatever she touches into gold.
- Amaranth Hawlutt (Aaf Capmi Piap): She is a human magic user created by Chaos and Witchcraft.

== Critical reception ==
Ratings
Issue	AIPT	Comicbook
#1	7.5/10	3.5/5

David Brooke of AIPT, opined that New Champions #1 succeeded at introducing of a new team while balancing their personal life with the challenges of heroism, and that fans of teenage superheroes or character-driven narratives would enjoy the issue. He also commented that the action and pacing of story could use refinement as "dialogue-heavy sections slowed the pacing and overshadowed character development".

== Collected editions ==
Title	Material collected	Pages	Publication date	ISBN
TBA
