= Steve Foxe =

American comic book writer and editor

- Born: Steve Foxe
- Areas: Writer, Editor
- Notable works: X-Men '92: House of XCII , Dark X-Men, Dead X-Men, Spider-Woman, X-Men: Heir to Apocalypse, Chasm: Curse of Kaine

Steve Foxe is an American comics writer, editor, children's book author, and journalist. He is best known for his work on the X-Men and Spider-Woman and for editing a number of horror comics by James Tynion IV, as well as co-creating Razorblades: The Horror Magazine. He has been nominated for the Eisner and Ringo Awards. He is the co-creator of Web-Weaver, Marvel's first gay Spider-hero, with Kris Anka.

== Career ==
Foxe was a comics journalist for Paste Magazine from 2015 through 2019. He has written "more than fifty comics and children's books for properties including Pokémon, Batman, Transformers, Adventure Time, Steven Universe, and Grumpy Cat."

In 2021, he was announced as the writer for Spider-Ham: Great Power, No Responsibility, a children's graphic novel from Scholastic. In 2022, he became the writer for X-Men '92: House of XCII, a reinterpretation of House of X and Powers of X and the Krakoan Age through the lens of X-Men: The Animated Series with artist Salva Espin. He also co-created and digitally self-published Razorblades: The Horror Magazine with James Tynion IV, which gained critical acclaim. The horror magazine featured stories by Ram V, Marguerite Bennett, Nick Robles, DaNi, Lonnie Nadler, and more, along with interviews of other comics creators such as Scott Snyder. He also became the writer for Archer & Armstrong Forever, a four-issue series from Valiant Entertainment.

In June 2022, it was announced that he would be writing Marvel's first gay male Spider-hero, Web-Weaver, in Edge of Spider-Verse #5 and then in December, it was announced that Party and Prey, the queer horror comic he co-write with Steve Orlando, was optioned for a movie by Legendary.

In 2023, he wrote X-Men Annual (2023) #1, along with artist Andrea Di Vito, an issue focusing on Firestar, before being announced as the writer for the Fall of X mini-series Dark X-Men with artist Jonas Scharf and Spider-Woman with artist Carola Borelli. He was also announced to be the writer for another Fall of X mini-series, Dead X-Men, as well as X-Men '97, a four-issue mini-series that served as a prequel to the animated show and X-Men: Heir to Apocalypse, a post-Krakoa mini-series that bridges the gap before the X-Men: From the Ashes relaunch.

In 2024, Foxe also wrote Chasm: Curse of Kaine, a mini-series about the former and current Scarlet Spiders meeting each other. In May 2024, he became the writer for the all ages comic Spider-Man: Homeroom Heroes. In September 2024, he was announced as the writer of New Champions, a book focusing on teen heroes originally introduced through variant covers, and Timeslide, a one-shot issue about Cable and Bishop which would foreshadow upcoming Marvel storylines.

== Personal life ==
He is gay and lives in Queens, New York, with his partner and dog.

== Bibliography ==
=== Children's Books ===
- 44 Cats: Cats Rock! (2020)
- Adventure Kingdom (2021)
- Adventure Kingdom: A Knight of the Realm (2023)
- The Amazing Journey from Moss to Rain Forests (2023)
- Animal Crossing New Horizons Official Activity Book (2021)
- Baby Shark's Big Show! Hide and Hunt (2022)
- Baby Shark's Big Show! The Bunny Slug (2022)
- Batman: Copycat! (2021)
- DC Super Friends: Race Across Gotham City (2016)
- DC Super Friends: Hot Pursuit (2023)
- Far Out Fables
  - The Goose That Laid the Rotten Egg (2021)
  - Little Ren Hen, Video Star (2021)
- Irrational Treasure (a Dumb and Dumber Original Story) (2022)
- The Justice League Saves Christmas! (2022)
- Justice League: Versus (2015)
- Llama Llama Family Vacation (2020)
- Llama Llama Daddy's Day (2021)
- Legend of Zelda: Link's Book of Adventure (2018)
- LEGO City:
  - Game On! (2019)
  - Costume Capers (2022)
  - Birthday Helpers! (2022)
  - Meet the Singer! (2023)
  - Meet the Astronaut (2024)
  - Awesome Tales! (2024)
- Mr. Kazarian, Alien Librarian (2019)
- Mr. Kazarian, Alien Librarian Vol. 2: The Black Hole Bandits (2020)
- Mr. Kazarian, Alien Librarian Vol. 3: The Asteroid Excursion (2020)
- My Little Pony: Meet the Ponies of Maritime Bay (2022)
- Planets in Our Solar System:
  - Saturn (2020)
  - Jupiter (2020)
  - Neptune (2020)
  - Uranus (2020)
- Pokémon: The Big Book of the Alola Region (2017)
- Pokémon: The Big Book of Small to Tall Pokémon (2018)
- Rainbow High: Get a Clue! (2023)
- Rainbow High: Amaya's First Day Drama (2023)
- Rainbow High: No Rain, No Rainbow (2024)
- Scary Graphics:
  - Beach Nightmare (2020)
  - What's in the Woods? (2020)
  - Road Trip Terror (2020)
  - Best Friends Until the End (2021)
- Spider-Ham: Great Power, No Responsibility (2021)
- Spider-Ham: Hollywood May-Ham (2022)
- Spider-Ham: A Pig in Time (2023)
- Sports Illustrated for Kids:
  - Jump Throws and Curtain Calls: Baseball's Most Signature Moves, Celebrations, and More (2024)
  - Ronaldo Chops and Jersey Swaps: Soccer's Most Signature Moves, Celebrations, and More (2024)
  - Tornado Dunks and Chalk Tosses: Basketball's Most Signature Moves, Celebrations, and More (2024)
  - One Hand Grabs and Griddy Dances: Football's Most Signature Moves, Celebrations, and More (2024)
- Super Mario: Here We Go! (2019)
- Super Mario (Little Golden Books) (2021)
- Super Mario Deluxe Paint Book (2022)
- Super Wings:
  - Meet the Super Wings (2019)
  - A Super First Day (2019)
  - Lost Stars (2019)
  - Shark Surf Surprise (2020)
  - Airport Adventure (2020)
- Tales of the Tiny Folk:
  - Alma vs. the Snowpocalypse (2024)
  - Iggy Follows the Snail Trail (2024)
  - Ash's Market Day Mayhem (2024)
  - Roo and the Big Garden Redo (2024)
- Transformers Rescue Bots: Meet Blurr (2016)
- Transformers Rescue Bots: Race to the Rescue (2016)
- Transformers Rescue Bots: Meet Griffin Rock Rescue: Character Guide (2016)
- Transformers Rescue Bots: Meet High Tide (2015)
- Transformers Robots in Disguise: Drift's Samurai Showdown (2015)
- Transformers Robots in Disguise: Autobot World Tour (2016)
- Transformers Robots in Disguise: A New Adventure (2016)
- Transformers Robots in Disguise: Decepticon Island (2017)
- Transformers Robots in Disguise: The Trials of Optimus Prime
- True Survival Graphics
  - Lost in the Jungle (2024)
  - Deadly Natural Disasters (2024)
- Yawn! A Grumpy Cat Bedtime Story (2018)

=== Marvel Comics ===
- Alien: Black, White & Blood #3, short story "Lucky" (2024)
- Alien: Paradiso #1-4 (2024–2025)
- Beastly Buddies Infinity Comic #1-6 (2024)
- Deadpool: Seven Slaughters #1, short story "No Spider Blues" (2023)
- Spider-Verse:
  - Edge of Spider-Verse vol. 2 #5, short story "Counterfeit Catwalk" (2022)
  - Marvel's Voices: Spider-Verse #1, short story "Fire With Fire" (2023)
  - Amazing Spider-Man vol. 6 #31, short story (2023)
  - Spider-Woman vol. 8 #1-10 (2023–2024)
  - Web of Spider-Man vol. 3 #1, short story "Spider-Woman" (2024)
  - Spider-Man Unlimited Infinity Comic #37-38 (2024)
  - Edge of Spider-Verse vol. 4 #3, short story "Birds of a Feather" (2024)
  - Chasm: Curse of Kaine #1-4 (2024)
  - Venomverse Reborn #3, short story "Beyond the Void" (2024)
  - Spider-Man: Homeroom Heroes #1-present (2024–present)
  - Spider-Boy Annual #1 (2024)
- Marvel's Voices: Pride vol. 3 #1, short story "Today's Lesson" (2023)
- New Champions #1-present (2025–present)
- Strange Tales: She-Hulk Infinity Comic #1 (2022)
- Timeslide #1 (2024)
- X-Men:
  - X-Men '92: House of XCII #1-5 (2022)
  - X-Men Vote Comics Strips vol. 2 #1-5 (2022)
  - X-Men Unlimited Infinity Comic #50-55, 100-142 (2022–2024)
  - X-Men Annual vol. 4 #1 (2022)
  - X-Men: Hellfire Gala Last Rites Infinity Comic #1 (2023)
  - Dark X-Men vol. 2 #1-5 (2024)
  - Dead X-Men #1-4 (2024)
  - X-Men '97 vol. 2 #1-4 (2024)
  - X-Men: Heir of Apocalypse #1-4 (2024)
  - X-Men: Blood Hunt - Psylocke #1 (2024)

=== Other Companies ===
==== AfterShock Comics ====
- Rainbow Bridge (2021) (co-written with Steve Orlando)
- Party and Prey (2020) (co-written with Steve Orlando)

==== Boom! Studios ====
- Adventure Time Comics #18 (2017)
- Steven Universe: Fusion Frenzy #1 (2019)

==== Dark Horse Comics ====
- All Eight Eyes #1-4 (2023)
- Blue Book #4 (2023) (co-written with James Tynion IV)
- Let This One Be a Devil #1-4 (2025) (co-written with James Tynion IV)

==== Image Comics ====
- Creepshow #2 (2022)

==== Limerence Press ====
- Cheat(er) Code (2020) (as S.A. Foxe)

==== Z2 Comics ====
- Ice Nine Kills: Inked in Blood (2020)
