= Psylocke =

Fictional superhero from Marvel Comics

- Textless variant cover of Excalibur (vol. 4) #19, featuring both characters associated with the codename Psylocke: Betsy Braddock (left) and Kwannon (right). Art by Mahmud Asrar and Matthew Wilson.
- Publisher: Marvel Comics
- First appearance: Earth-616: Betsy Braddock: Captain Britain #8; (December 1976); Debut as Psylocke: The New Mutants Annual #2; (October 1986); Kwannon: X-Men #17; (February 1993); Debut as Psylocke: Fallen Angels #1; (November 2019); Earth-6160: Sai: Demon Days: X-Men #1; (March 2021); Kanon Sainouchi: Ultimate X-Men #7; (September 2024)
- Created by: Chris Claremont (writer); Herb Trimpe (artist)
- Characters: Earth-616: Betsy Braddock; Kwannon; Earth-6160: Sai; Kanon Sainouchi

Psylocke
- : Psylocke #1 (2009) featuring the body-swapped Betsy Braddock version of the character, art by David Finch and Jason Keith.

Series publication information
- Schedule: Monthly
- Format: Limited series
- Genre: Superhero
- Publication date: Nov. 2009 - Feb. 2010
- Number of issues: 4
- Main character(s): Psylocke (Betsy Braddock)

Creative team
- Writer(s): Christopher Yost
- Penciller(s): Harvey Tolibao
- Inker(s): Paul Neary
- Colorist(s): Jay David Ramos

Psylocke is the alias of two connected characters appearing in American comic books published by Marvel Comics, commonly in association with the X-Men. Both characters are mutants, a subspecies of humans born with an "X-gene" that grants superhuman abilities.

In the primary continuity of the Marvel Universe, the first and best-known incarnation of Psylocke is Betsy Braddock (created by Chris Claremont and Herb Trimpe), a British telepath who was introduced as a supporting character for her twin brother Brian in 1976. Betsy adopts the codename "Psylocke" upon joining the X-Men in 1986, and three years later takes on the appearance of a Japanese woman and the abilities of a ninja in a story written by Claremont and illustrated by Jim Lee. This redesign was retroactively revealed in 1993 as the result of a body swap with the ninja assassin Kwannon (created by Fabian Nicieza and Andy Kubert). Following 29 years of publication history, both women were returned to their respective bodies, and Betsy assumed the mantle of Captain Britain from her brother while Kwannon became the second Psylocke.

The Ultimate Universe features two versions of Psylocke: Sai and Kanon Sainouchi (both created by Peach Momoko).

In addition to their presence in numerous X-related team titles over the decades, both iterations of Psylocke have been featured in various limited series and one-shots. In 1997, Betsy Braddock, as Psylocke, appeared in the 4-issue team-up series Psylocke and Archangel: Crimson Dawn. Additionally, she starred in the one-shot X-Men: Sword of the Braddocks #1 in 2009 and the solo 4-issue series X-Men: Psylocke in 2010. During the Krakoan Age, Kwannon as Psylocke appeared in various team books such as the Hellions (2020) and Marauders (2022) and then starred in the one-shot X-Men: Blood Hunt – Psylocke #1 in 2024. As part of the X-Men: From the Ashes relaunch, Kwannon joined the main X-Men team, appearing in the 2024 series X-Men. Psylocke starred in a new solo ongoing series starting in November 2024.

The character has been adapted in various media incarnations, including films, television series, and video games, having most notably been portrayed by Olivia Munn in the film X-Men: Apocalypse (2016). She is voiced by Naoko Mori in the second season of X-Men '97 (2026).

== Publication history ==
=== Betsy Braddock ===
Created by writer Chris Claremont, Elizabeth "Betsy" Braddock first appeared in Captain Britain #8 (December 1976), which was published by the Marvel Comics' British imprint Marvel UK. In New Mutants Annual #2 (1986), Claremont integrated Braddock into the X-Men franchise. After being rescued by the New Mutants, Braddock is formally invited to join the X-Men and officially adopts the codename Psylocke, becoming an enduring fixture of the team over the next three decades.

In Uncanny X-Men #256 (December 1989), an amnesiac Braddock is kidnapped by the Hand, who brainwash her and physically alter her to take on an East Asian appearance. Under the name Lady Mandarin, she briefly becomes the Hand's supreme assassin. While her memories return, she retains her new appearance and skills, including the ability to manifest the focused totality of her telepathic power in the form of a "psychic knife". The art for Psylocke's redesigned costume is by Jim Lee. In a later interview, he describes the creative process:

For Psylocke’s new look, which I collaborated on with Chris Claremont, she appears on the cover in armor. That was my first take on the character, which I had to get done for the cover before I had finished the interior look, and I don’t think Chris had signed off on yet. He didn’t like that direction as much -- he wanted something slinkier, more like Elektra -- that you eventually see inside that issue. But that discussion led us to modify the story a little. When you first see her, she’s in that armor, and through a psychic conflict, you see it smashed off of her body to unveil the new costume that Chris wanted.

A 1993 story by Fabian Nicieza retroactively established that Braddock's changed appearance was the product of a body swap between her and the assassin Kwannon.

In the Claremont-written X-Treme X-Men #2 (2001), the character dies, her comic book death lasting until 2005's Uncanny X-Men #455. During the 2018 "Hunt for Wolverine" storyline, Sapphire Styx absorbs Braddock's soul, leaving her body dead. After destroying Styx from the inside with assistance from a fragment of Wolverine's soul, Braddock reconstitutes her original body with Styx's remaining power. Braddock becomes Captain Britain, while Kwannon becomes Psylocke in her stead.

=== Kwannon ===
Kwannon was the Hand's prime assassin before incurring brain damage and falling comatose as a result of a battle with her lover Matsu'o Tsurayaba, a high-ranking member of the Hand. Tsurayaba sought the help of the sorceress Spiral, who swapped Braddock and Kwannon's bodies rather than simply healing Kwannon.

After accepting that she is not the original Betsy Braddock, Kwannon becomes a member of the X-Men, shortly thereafter contracting the Legacy Virus. As the disease progresses, Kwannon's psychic abilities increase, allowing her to clarify her own distorted memory. Choosing to die on her own terms, Kwannon confronts Tsurayaba, who complies with her request to kill her rather than waiting to die.

Following the Hunt for Wolverine, when Braddock is restored to her original body, Kwannon is reborn in her original body as well. Claiming the codename Psylocke for herself, Kwannon becomes a citizen of the mutant nation of Krakoa. Kwannon is assigned to monitor Mister Sinister's Hellions, composed of mutants considered too violent or troubled to assimilate into Krakoan society. Following the fall of Krakoa, Kwannon joins Cyclops's X-Men team in Alaska.

== Race swap controversy ==
Psylocke was initially the code name of Elizabeth Braddock, a British woman. However, in a Marvel storyline of 1989, Acts of Vengeance, she was "physically transformed into an Asian woman by a villain seeking to brainwash her and turn her into an elite assassin for a group of ninja warriors." This has been criticized as racially insensitive or stereotypical by multiple fans and critics. For example, Anna Lam calls her new form a "fetishized Asian sex object in the style of the classic Dragon Lady of the 1930s." Chris Claremont, the writer of the story, has said that this transformation was originally simply a disguise but became semi-permanent because most fans embraced it. The artist for the story is Jim Lee, a Korean American.

== Collections ==
Title	Material collected	Publication date	ISBN
Psylocke & Archangel: Crimson Dawn	Psylocke & Archangel: Crimson Dawn (1997) #1–4	July 20, 2016	ISBN 978-1-3029-0070-0
X-Men: Psylocke – Kill Matsu'o	Psylocke (vol. 1) #1–4, Uncanny X-Men (1963) #256–258	June 8, 2010	ISBN 978-0-7851-4439-7
Psylocke: Guardian	Psylocke (vol. 2) #1–5	July 8, 2025	ISBN 978-1-3029-6156-5
Psylocke: Nightmares of the Past	Psylocke (vol. 2) #6–10	December 16, 2025	ISBN 978-1-3029-6157-2
Psylocke: Ninja – Rise from the Fall	Psylocke: Ninja #1–5	2026	—N/a
Sai: Dimensional Rivals	Sai: Dimensional Rivals #1–5	2026	—N/a

== Other versions ==
=== Butterfly ===
An original incarnation of Psylocke named O-Chiyo Braddock appears in 5 Ronin. This version is the English-Japanese orphan daughter of a local Japanese woman who died when she was a baby and an English expat trader who committed suicide when she was a child after his business failed. After being forced into the yoshiwara to survive, O-Chiyo grows up to become the top-ranked prostitute, codenamed "Butterfly", in a high-end brothel. She later crosses paths with a Ronin called the Wolverine, who becomes her regular customer.

=== Ultimate Universe ===
Two incarnations of Psylocke from Earth-6160, Sai and her descendant Kanon Sainouchi, appear in series set in the Ultimate Universe.

==== Sai ====
Sai appears in Demon Days: X-Men. She is an adventurous Japanese samurai accompanied by a wolf named Logan who comes from a variation of ancient Japan where humans used to coexist with yōkai until the avarice within humans caused a conflict between both species.

==== Kanon Sainouchi ====
Sainouchi appears in Ultimate X-Men. Kanon is the Ultimate counterpart of Kwannon. She is a senior at Idori High School, an expert fencer, and younger sister of a police officer named Tatsuya.

== In other media ==
Psylocke has been adapted in various forms of media, including films, television series, and video games. Olivia Munn portrayed the character in the film X-Men: Apocalypse. She appears in the second season of X-Men '97, voiced by Naoko Mori.

The Sai incarnation of Psylocke from Demon Days: X-Men appears as a playable character in the video game Marvel Rivals, voiced by Alpha Takahashi in the English version.
