= Onward Towards Our Noble Deaths =

Japanese manga by Shigeru Mizuki

- Cover of Onward Towards Our Noble Deaths as published by Drawn & Quarterly

総員玉砕せよ! (Sōin Gyokusai Seyo!)
- Genre: War, autobiographical
- Manga
- Written by: Shigeru Mizuki
- Published by: Kodansha
- English publisher: NA: Drawn & Quarterly
- Magazine: Shūkan Gendai
- Published: 1973
- Volumes: 1
- Television drama

Kitarō ga Mita Gyokusai: Mizuki Shigeru no Sensō
- Produced by: Tsuyoshi Yanagawa
- Written by: Takuya Nishioka
- Original network: NHK General TV
- Original run: August 12, 2007
- Episodes: 1

Onward Towards Our Noble Deaths (Japanese: 総員玉砕せよ!, Hepburn: Sōin Gyokusai Seyo!; literally "Whole Unit Ought to Fight to Death!") (Note: Also translated as "Let us all die honorably!" and "Let's All Commit Ritual Suicide!" by other sources.) is a one-shot manga written and illustrated by Shigeru Mizuki. In it, Mizuki describes his experiences as a soldier participating in the New Guinea campaign during World War II. He portrays the final weeks of his infantry service as the soldiers were instructed to die for their country to avoid the dishonor of survival.

The manga was first published in Kodansha magazine Shūkan Gendai in 1973, based on Mizuki's work of 1970. After being translated and published by Drawn & Quarterly in 2011, Onward Towards Our Noble Deaths has been well received by English-speaking critics. It also received awards in France and in the United States, and was adapted into a television drama in 2007 by Japanese broadcaster NHK.

== Overview ==
Shigeru Mizuki is a Japanese manga artist who is best known for his yōkai (Japanese folklore monsters)-themed manga, especially GeGeGe no Kitarō. Mizuki enjoyed writing about the monsters' histories, which a local woman related to him; however in 1942, at the age of 21, Mizuki was drafted into the Imperial Japanese Army. He was sent to Rabaul, a city on New Britain island in Papua New Guinea, where his comrades died and Mizuki lost his left arm. Based on these experiences, Mizuki wrote Onward Towards Our Noble Deaths, containing "90 percent fact". Fictionalizing himself as private Maruyama, Mizuki tells the story by combining drawings with photographs. Mizuki has described the work as a response to the "ghosts" of fallen soldiers, figures who animate his creative rage and compel him to document their experiences.

== Release ==
Shigeru Mizuki wrote and illustrated Sōin Gyokusai Seyo!, which was first published in the August 1973 issue of Shūkan Gendai. In the same year, Kodansha released it in tankōbon format with the subtitle Sento Jōji Misaki Aika (聖ジョージ岬・哀歌; "Cape St. George Lamentations"). In July 1985, Holp Shuppan published the work, and Kodansha re-released it on June 15, 1995. Ohzora Publishing released the manga on August 9, 2007, as Ā Gyokusai: Mizuki Shigeru Senki Senshū (ああ玉砕～水木しげる戦記選集～), and on July 30, 2010, as Mizuki Shigeru no Senki Senshū (水木しげるの戦記選集). It was released under the konbini comic format by Shueisha on August 11, 2007, and on August 16, 2008.

At the 2010 San Diego Comic-Con, comic book publisher Drawn & Quarterly announced it had acquired the manga's publishing rights and would release it in North America under the title Onward Towards Our Noble Deaths. The company released the manga in May 2011; it was the first manga by Mizuki published in English. The Drawn & Quarterly edition was 368 pages and had an introduction written by manga commentator Frederik L. Schodt, as well as an interview with Mizuki. The publisher chose the work because they thought it was "an excellent introduction" to Mizuki's work, and because "readers have knowledge of and thus can relate to on a certain level".

== Analysis ==
According to scholar Yuka Hasegawa, in Onward Towards Our Noble Deaths, Shigeru Mizuki explores the Japanese concept of kokoro, which can mean "heart", "mind", or "spirit". Unlike other war manga such as Keiji Nakazawa's Barefoot Gen, which shows kokoro through physical actions and survival, Mizuki focuses on kokoro as something internal—made up of thoughts, feelings, and memories. His characters often reflect quietly on their lives and deaths, showing a more contemplative or inward-facing approach to war. This aligns with philosopher Hannah Arendt's idea of the vita contemplativa, or the "life of contemplation", which is about thinking and reflecting rather than doing. Mizuki's manga shows soldiers not in battle, but performing everyday tasks, like finding food or resting, and thinking about what their lives and deaths mean. These moments highlight their fear, confusion, and resignation. Mizuki shows that these quiet, ordinary moments are just as important as dramatic ones. The soldiers often ask painful questions, like why they are being sent to die, and whether their deaths will matter. Mizuki creates a space for readers to witness these emotions, and to reflect on the human cost of war.

Mizuki based the story on his own experiences as a soldier. He once said he felt "rage" when remembering the war, and that this anger came from the memory of those who died. The manga includes scenes that mix humor with tragedy, like a soldier choking on a fish he was excited to eat, which show how meaningless and absurd death in war can be. Rather than glorifying battle, Mizuki focuses on the emotional lives of soldiers who were forced into impossible situations. The manga ends with a scene in which a soldier named Murayama dies alone, realizing no one will remember him or the others.

Although Onward Towards Our Noble Deaths is not openly political, it criticizes the military system that sent young men to die in hopeless suicide missions. By showing the soldiers as thoughtful and human, Mizuki questions the values of the Imperial Japanese Army and, indirectly, modern political efforts to re-militarize Japan. The manga suggests that real dignity and strength come from reflection and honesty, not from blind obedience.

== Reception and legacy ==
Onward Towards Our Noble Deaths has been critically acclaimed. At the 2009 Angoulême International Comics Festival, the manga won the Prize for Inheritance. In 2012, it was nominated for a Harvey Award in the Best American Edition of Foreign Material category. It was selected for the Eisner Award in the categories Best U.S. Edition of International Material—Asia and Best Reality-Based Work, winning the former at San Diego Comic-Con.

According to a compilation by Deb Aoki of About.com, Onward Towards Our Noble Deaths was considered the best new manga of 2011 because it was included in 18 critics lists of best comics/graphic novels. Aoki said the manga is "dense with details, and filled with pathos, humor and horror". Paste's Garrett Martin wrote that the "realistic depictions of normal men trapped in a horrible situation" makes Onward Towards Our Noble Deaths "brutally honest". Brigid Alverson of MTV Geek said, "this is not an easy story to read, but its historical importance and the lessons it holds for the future are undeniable". Noel Murray writing in The A.V. Club said the manga's artwork is "detailed, often beautiful illustrations of small Pacific islands with characters rendered far less elaborately". Karen Green of Comixology wrote that the "story is so human and its message so powerful" and that is a good book to eliminate the preconceptions American may have of the Japanese Army that are frequently propagated by Hollywood. Among others, Library Journal, Dan Kois and Glen Weldon of NPR, Comic Book Resources, Ed Sizemore of Manga Worth Reading, and Publishers Weekly included it on their lists of best comic books of 2011. Further, in 2014, Joe Gross of the Rolling Stone qualified it as the 46th "Best Non-Superhero Graphic Novel" of all time.

David Maine wrote for PopMatters that "there is little here to criticize. Perhaps some of the transitions are a bit abrupt, [and] maybe some of the characterization could be sharper." Similarly, Sean Michael Robinson of The Comics Journal said Onward Towards Our Noble Deaths for its theme "as well as its many strengths and virtues, it is a very difficult book to criticize". Robinson's criticisms was that it has "loosely characterized" characters and that its art "can also be a stumbling block". He said the art is "problematic", as is "the hand-off—when characters suddenly leap modes, bouncy and expressive one moment, and photo-rendered and flat the next". Tom Spurgeon, writing for The Comics Reporter, said he had difficulty "in not being able to easily track which soldiers are which at any one point in the book".

=== Television adaptation ===
On August 12, 2007, NHK General TV broadcast Kitarō ga Mita Gyokusai: Mizuki Shigeru no Sensō (鬼太郎が見た玉砕 〜水木しげるの戦争〜), a Japanese television drama based on Onward Towards Our Noble Deaths. It was written by Takuya Nishioka and produced by Tsuyoshi Yanagawa, and starred Teruyuki Kagawa as Shigeru Mizuki. On July 16, 2008, Pony Canyon released the drama in DVD format. The Agency for Cultural Affairs awarded it the Excellence Prize for a television drama during the National Arts Festival. The drama was awarded the Excellence Prize for television program at the 45th Galaxy Awards by the Japan Council for Better Television and Radio. At the 34th Hoso Bunka Foundation Awards, Onward Towards Our Noble Deaths won the awards for Best Television Drama, Best Actor (Kagawa), and Best Production (Yanagawa).

==== Cast ====
- Teruyuki Kagawa as Shigeru Mizuki/Maruyama
- Tomoko Tabata as Nunoe
- Sansei Shiomi as Honda
- Kyūsaku Shimada as Ishiyama
- Takaaki Enoki as Kido
- Yukiya Kitamura as Akasaki
- Renji Ishibashi as a company commander
- Hiroshi Kanbe as Kayama
- Haruhiko Jō as the chief of staff
- Tetsurō Sagawa as the brigadier
- Atsushi Miyauchi as Mizumoto
- Masako Nozawa as Kitarō (voice)
- Isamu Tanonaka as Medama Oyaji (voice)
- Chikao Ōtsuka as Nezumi Otoko (voice)
