= Ultimate X-Men (2024) =

Comic book series

- Ultimate X-Men #8

Publication information
- Publisher: Marvel Comics
- Schedule: Monthly
- Format: Ongoing series
- Genre: Superhero
- Publication date: March 2024 – February 2026
- No. of issues: 24
- Main character(s): Armor; Maystorm; Nico Minoru; Mori; Natsu Tsukishima; Shinobu Kageyama

Creative team
- Created by: Inspired by the X-Men by Jack Kirby and Stan Lee
- Written by: Peach Momoko (primary writer), Zack Davisson (script adaptation)
- Artist: Peach Momoko
- Letterer: Vc Travis Lanham
- Editor: Wilson Moss

Ultimate X-Men (Vol. 2) is a superhero horror comic book series featuring a reimagination of the X-Men in the Ultimate Universe, written and illustrated by Peach Momoko with script adaptation by Zack Davisson. Starring Armor as the lead character, the comic has very few links to the classic X-Men characters and locations. Maystorm, another character from the series, was initially created as a variant cover for of X-Men (vol. 6) #27 (2023).

== Publication history ==
Ultimate X-Men by Peach Momoko with Zack Davisson is the third comic released in the 2024 Ultimate Universe line, alongside Ultimate Spider-Man and Ultimate Black Panther. It is a reimagination of the X-Men in general, and the Armor character in particular. The comic also introduces Maystorm, a character that Momoko designed for the variant cover of X-Men (vol. 6) #27 (2023). That cover was part of a larger project named "New Champions", which produced covers reflecting unexpected sidekicks of other superheroes, such as the recently created Spider-Boy; Maystorm was the first one to be used in an actual story, while the others would show up in the main Earth-616 continuity in the Spider-Woman series and later their own solo series. Despite being an X-Men comic, Ultimate X-Men has very little in common with the usual products of the franchise. Momoko explained "My Ultimate X-Men isn't directly influenced by classic X-Men stories. I like to believe [Editor-in-Chief] C.B. [Cebulski] and Jonathan Hickman chose me because they wanted something completely new and different, so I think sometimes no influences is a good thing".

The comic Ultimate Wolverine was released in 2025. Although it features Wolverine, Nightcrawler, Mystique, Colossus and Magik, prominent characters from the X-Men franchise, the comic is largely unrelated to Ultimate X-Men.

== Plot ==
=== "Fears And Hates" (#1–6) ===
Hisako Ichiki attends Kirigaya Minami Middle School in Kirisaki City. She can manifest a psionic exoskeleton, a power that awakens in traumatic circumstances regarding Shinobu Kageyama and his Shadow King form. Other students, such as Mei Igarashi and Nico Minoru, have powers as well. Mei has weather-based powers and is a fan of Storm. Nico has magic-based abilities. They find out that they are mutants, and that there is a cult of mutants called the Children of the Atom led by Maester who go after them. Their activity also catches the attention of Kanon Sainouchi and her police officer brother Tatsuya when a briefcase with human remains are found and Tatsuya had to sign a non-disclosure agreement from Emperor Sunfire's minion Viper. As Natsu Tsukishima manifests an eye beam from her right eye while protecting Mori, Armor meets Chimone from the 8-Chome Channel. Maester tells the Children of the Atom that it's time to step out of the shadows as Noriko Ashida secretly live-streams the event. When one of the followers asks if the world is coming to an end, Maester states "Yes".

=== "Children of the Atom" (#7–12) ===
As news about the leaked video is made known, Maester tries to get through to Viper about the situation. Shinobu encounters Akihiro who claims that he is the first homo superior and had given his blood to the Children of the Atom. Mei has her encounter with Noriko where they fought each other and over the Children of the Atom's actions. She accidentally injures Noriko who turns down Mei's offer to call an ambulance as "they'll come after her" if they know and to call her mom instead. Protests erupt over the mutants on the streets as Maester tells the Children of the Atom that they will show the people who is superior. Some of the Children of the Atom attack the persisting reporters as the streamer Yukio's phone is broken by Hisako. Tsubasa's Shadow King form attacks some people pressuring Hisako in giving them information causing Hisako to reveal her abilities to her mother. Natsu Tsukishima accidentally kills her mother with her left eye optic blast. Reporters try interviewing mutants who have no connection with the Children of the Atom. Hisako visits Nico where Mori shows her the information regarding the mutants. Someone later breaks into the abandoned office of the Children of the Atom and claims a mask. Nico Minoru and Mori later sneak into Natsu's room and find what appears to be a bullet hole in one of the doors. After a chat with Mei where she mentioned encountering some members of the Children of the Atom, Hisako visits the temple behind Kirigawa Minami Middle School and meets Kanon Sainouchi, who states that she is the descendant of Sai. Both of them end of unleashing their abilities during this confrontation when Kanon manages to briefly break her "armored" form. Mei Igarashi meets some members of the Children of the Atom while wearing a mask and takes the name Maystorm. Shinobu Kageyama's Shadow King form appears and starts taunting them as some mysterious obscured people show up. Maystorm states that she is here to save the Children of the Atom as someone secretly films this encounter. As a mutant war breaks out with footage being watched by a streamer named Yukio, Maystorm recaps to when she last fought Shadow King. Nico and Mori use Natsu's eyepatch to trace her to the Children of the Atom as Shadow King briefly attacks. Hisako is later confronted by Kageyama as he corrupts her with his shadows.

=== "The Realm of the Mind" (#13-18) ===
Shadow King subjects Dark Armor to an illusion where she has to fight her friends. It is then revealed that Maester has Hisako and Kageyama in his clutches and held in stasis tanks. As Maester continues experimenting on Hisako and Kageyama, he explains to Viper that Hisako and Kageyama are the solutions for the My-X Project. In Hisako's mindscape, Noriko arrives and fights Maystorm in a rematch. When Noriko is defeated, Dark Armor resumes her attack. She then sees a giant winged manifestation of Tsubasa. Hisako flashes back to when Tsubasa was still alive. Meanwhile, Yukio and her friend find Yukio's apartment trashed. At the same time, Nico Minoru and Mori go looking for Hisako and infiltrate one of the Children of the Atom meetings. Maystorm and another Children of the Atom member learn that Hisako has been taken.

Tatsuya Sainouchi and Futaba go over the Children of the Atom-related information called Project My-X. They also talk about a contact in the Children of the Atom who is already preparing for something. At the Temple of the Children of the Atom, Nico Minoru has infiltrated it under the alias of Miss Grimm as Maester does his next transmission. Maester and Viper continue their experiments on Shinobu Kageyama and Hisako Ichiki. Maystorm and Kanon Sainouchi confront Mori, who keeps hearing the name "Akihiro". Tatsuya and Futaba then talk about Akihiro who was said to be the "first mutant" as he claims that trouble has already found his sister.

Four months ago, Nico Minoru and Mori find Hisako's home trashed and her charm left behind. They meet Futaba, who gives them information on the church where the Children of the Atom are said to be using as their headquarters. In the present, Nico Minoru's Miss Grimm alias finds Hisako who does not remember her and runs into Maester as Noriko Ishida arrives. In the cafeteria, Nico interacts with Noriko who warns her not to do any sneaking around. Later that night, Nico tries to call someone only to be attacked by Noriko. Nico fights back until she is restrained by a tentacled mutant as Maestro claims that Nico is far from being a true Homo Superior. Meanwhile, Kanon and Tatsuya talk about Kanon wanting to raid the Children of the Atom's headquarters until she gets a text from Mei Igarashi. Futaba shows up to offer Kanon a ride.

Kanon, Futaba and Mori talk about Tatsuya's plan. He poses as a delivery man to get someone at the Children of the Atom's building to open the door. When someone does and grabs Tatsuya, Maystorm leads her X-Men into invading the building. The tentacled mutant breaks up the fight stating that Maester is expecting them. Though Maystorm throws a branch at the mutant. The conflict enabled Kanon, Futaba, and Mori to sneak into the building. They find a room where Akihiro and Hisako are hooked up. They try to free her until Kageyama teleports them into the mindscape much to the dismay of Maester. Maystorm makes her way into the building while her teammates continue the fight. Kageyama unleashes the darkened Hisako onto Kanon and Futaba. Maystorm and Nico enter the mindscape. Hisako manages to break free and shove Kageyama and his shadow into Akihiro's wires. Then she goes through the wires stating to everyone that she needs to fight Kageyama as Nico returns Hisako's charm to her. Mori is then confronted by Maester who identifies her as Number 127.

While holding Mori, Maester confronts Maystorm, Nico Minoru, Kanon, and Futaba where he asks where Hisako Ichiki and Shinobu Kageyama are. They state that they are in Akihiro. He is then shot in the shoulder by Natsu. Maester slices off Mori's arm as Natsu continues the attack. With Maester on the ground, Mori's arm starts to regenerate. Drinking Mori's blood to heal himself, Maester crawls towards Akihiro who begs Maester to kill him. Tasting the blood that Akihiro bled out, Maester states that My-X has been completed as Yukio secretly films it. Two weeks later, there are talks about the Children of the Atom and the amount of mutants in Hi no Kune and the Meatcase cover-up and that the streamer Chisame has gone dark. A breaking news report states that raids will be occurring on the Children of the Atom's locations and an arrest warrant for Maester whose whereabouts are unknown. Mori talks with Mei and Nico about how she has been cut up by Maester before as Natsu arrives no longer wearing an eyepatch. While Hisako and Kageyama are still missing, it was mentioned that Akihiro was taken into custody. Mei mentions that Hisako was going to where Tsubasa died. When Mori asks where Tsubasa died, Yukio shows up stating that she knows and that the Children of the Atom are still planning something big as Maester's mutants are killing more people. While being identified as Chisame by Nico, Yukio directs them to the temple behind Kirigaya Minami Middle School. They meet up with Kanon and find Hisako unconscious within a tree. Injecting Noriko with My-X, Maester sends Noriko to deal with the X-Men as he injects himself with My-X.

=== "Children's Whereabouts" (#19-24) ===
As Hisako regains consciousness, the X-Men and Surge's group begin to face off against the street as Noriko fires her electric attack at a camera operator's camera. Amidst the battle, Maystorm tries to get Surge to snap out of it. When what appeared to be a giant shadowy version of Maester shows up to break up the fight, Hisako shows up to block his attacks. After attacking some humans, Maester tells Surge that she disappointed her and that he will kill their opponents himself. Armor works to protect everyone. Meanwhile, Kageyama wanders the streets. Hearing about the fights on the streets, Kageyama confronts Maester stating that he did not say that Maester can use his powers and kills him. As the opponents get to their feet, Maystorm and Kanon figure that Kageyama was responsible for the outcome.

Emperor Sunfire addresses Hi no Kuni about recent events and is going to do a rescript on mutants. While the Children of the Atom mentioned that they wear their masks to stand up for themselves, Nico Minoru casts a spell as she remembers seeing Viper before when she visited Maester. While Hisako Ichiki is out looking for Shinobu Kageyama, the others talk about the news broadcast. Surge saves a kid from being picked on. Kanon leads a motorcycle protest claiming that Emperor Sunfire is a mutant and has been using the mutants as guinea pigs. This is seen on TV by Emperor Sunfire and Viper, who plan to create the My-X soldiers as a countermeasure. Viper takes down the motorcycle protesters and overpowers Kanon vowing they will be skinned if they get in her way again. Later, Futaba tends to Kanon's injuries as the others are informed of what happened. Kageyama is in his hideout vowing that if he cannot have Hisako, nobody can.

Shinobu Kageyama flashes back to when he enrolled in Kirigaya Minami Middle School and met Hisako Ichiki. At the National Diet Building, a news report talks about the Mutant Registration Act, which has been the subject of protests. Maystorm is shown partaking in these protests. Emperor Sunfire addresses his mutant children in testing the My-X soldiers. Kanon has fixed her shina when meeting up with Nico Minoru, Natsu Tsukishima, Mori, and Futaba. The My-X soldiers attack, with one of them breaking Kanon's shina. Kageyama shows up and subdues the soldiers as Emperor Sunfire watches on his TV screen. Shinobu then prepares to attack Hisako.

Hisako Ichiki protects her friends from Shinobu Kageyama's attacks. He penetrates the psionic exoskeleton with his shadowy tentacles and knocks everyone out. Hisako throws her charm towards Shinobu to incapacitate him. She then squeezes the psionic exoskeleton around Shinobu, causing an explosion that causes them both to disappear. Emperor Sunfire and Viper send a crew to collect the My-X soldiers. During Christmas, Nico meets with Natsu and Mori, neither of whom have seen Maystorm since the incident. Maystorm causes a snowstorm and vows to find Hisako while having the X-Men look out for the other mutants.

In July, Natsu Tsukishima is visited by a boy who states that she killed someone with her power before disappearing. In October, Surge talks with the same mutant about Shinobu Kageyama's status. In November, Kanon fights off a group of punks as the mysterious boy tells her to find Hisako. In January, Maester welcomes Natsu into the Children of the Atom as she sees someone outside. In December, the boy is identified as Makoto Amano, who was a guinea pig for the My-X experiment and is out for revenge on Kageyama and the Children of the Atom.

Students at Kirigaya Minami Middle School have not heard from Hisako Ichiki and note that a streamer named Yoru has become the star of the Internet. There are talks about a pill called Stardust that is only sold to mutants. Mei meets with Nico Minoru, believing that Hisako is still alive and wanting her to read Hisako's onamori. Nico notices that the core is missing and that it had a reaction to the Stardust that Nico has. They go to Nico's Stardust dealer Yoru as Mei asks if she knew Makoto Amano. As Mei attacks Yoru, Makoto arrives stating that they are not ready and he must fulfill Hisako's promise before teleporting away. At a shrine, Mei leaves some flowers near a tree when she gets a text.

== Characters ==
=== Main characters ===
- Armor / Hisako Ichiki - A school girl who received a charm that unlocked her ability to form a psionic exoskeleton around her.
- Maystorm / Mei Igarashi - A girl who Hisako befriends who can control the weather and is a fan of Storm.
- Grimm / Nico Minoru - A girl and classmate of Hisako and Mei who possesses magic-based abilities.
- Natsu Tsukishima - A girl and classmate who has a white patch over her left eye that later manifests an optic beam attack. She is loosely based on Cyclops.
- Mori - A girl in a rabbit-eared hood who is one of Hisako's classmates. She can regenerate her body parts.
- Psylocke / Kanon Sainouchi - An older classmate of Hisako.

=== Villains ===
- Shadow King / Shinobu Kageyama - A boy who can bring out a shadowy aura.
- Emperor Sunfire / Shiro Yoshida - The Emperor of Hi no Kune.
  - Viper / Aida - A servant of Emperor Sunfire.
- Maester - The leader of the Children of the Atom cult who answers to Emperor Sunfire and Viper.
- My-X soldiers - Mutants who have been enhanced by My-X.

=== Other characters ===
- Tatsuya Sainouchi - A police officer who is the older brother of Kanon.
- Surge / Noriko Ishida - A mutant with electrical abilities and an associate of the Children of the Atom.
- Akihiro - A mutant in the Maester's possession.
- Yukio - A streamer.
- Futaba - A mutant researcher.
- Makoto Amono - A former member of the Children of the Atom with teleportation.

=== Organizations ===
- Children of the Atom - A cult of mutants that is led by Maester.

== Collected editions ==
#	Title	Material collected	Format	Pages	Released	ISBN
1	Fears And Hates	Ultimate X-Men (2024) #1–6 and material from Ultimate Universe (2023)	TPB	168	November 5, 2024	978-1302957315
2	Children of the Atom	Ultimate X-Men (2024) #7–12	TPB	136	May 27, 2025	978-1302958336
3	The Realm of the Mind	Ultimate X-Men (2024) #13–18	TPB	136	November 11, 2025	978-1302958343
4	Children's Whereabouts	Ultimate X-Men (2024) #19–24	TPB	144	May 5, 2026	978-1302958350

== Reception ==
Chase Magnett from ComicBook.com points out that the comic has little relation with the broader narrative of the Ultimate Universe, the usual X-Men tropes, or even the superhero genre. He thinks that the comic aims to expand the franchise's genre boundaries.

Shaun Corley from Screen Rant points out that the comic skips almost all the key characters and elements of X-Men lore, such as the X-Mansion and Sentinels, and characters such as Professor X, Cyclops, Wolverine and Storm. He considers that, by doing so, Momoko focuses instead on the core theme of the X-Men, that of people feeling lonely in a world that fears them.
