= Shigeru Mizuki =

Japanese manga artist (1922–2015)

Shigeru Mizuki 水木 しげる
- Mizuki in 2010
- Born: Shigeru Mura; March 8, 1922 Osaka, Osaka Prefecture, Japan
- Died: November 30, 2015 (aged 93) Tokyo, Japan
- Area: Manga artist
- Notable works: GeGeGe no Kitarō Onward Towards Our Noble Deaths; Akuma-kun; Showa: A History of Japan; Hitler
- Awards: See below

Shigeru Mura (Japanese: 武良 茂, Hepburn: Mura Shigeru; March 8, 1922 – November 30, 2015), best known by his pen name Shigeru Mizuki (水木 しげる, Mizuki Shigeru), was a Japanese manga artist, illustrator and folklorist. He is best known for popularizing and reviving interest in yōkai, supernatural creatures from Japanese folklore, especially through his most famous series GeGeGe no Kitarō.

Raised in Sakaiminato, Mizuki developed an early interest in art and the supernatural. Drafted during World War II, he lost his left arm in combat, an experience that deeply shaped his later antimilitarist works, including Onward Towards Our Noble Deaths.

Mizuki began his career in kamishibai (paper theater) and transitioned to manga in the late 1950s. His signature style contrasted cartoonish characters with highly detailed backgrounds and grotesque depictions of yōkai. Deeply influenced by oral folklore, especially stories told by a woman he called "Nonnonba," he also engaged in extensive ethnographic research. His works often combined autobiography, history, and fantasy to critique modernization, nationalism, and imperialism. A recipient of numerous awards, his legacy extends into global pop culture through translations, adaptations, and homages in media.

== Life ==
=== Early life ===
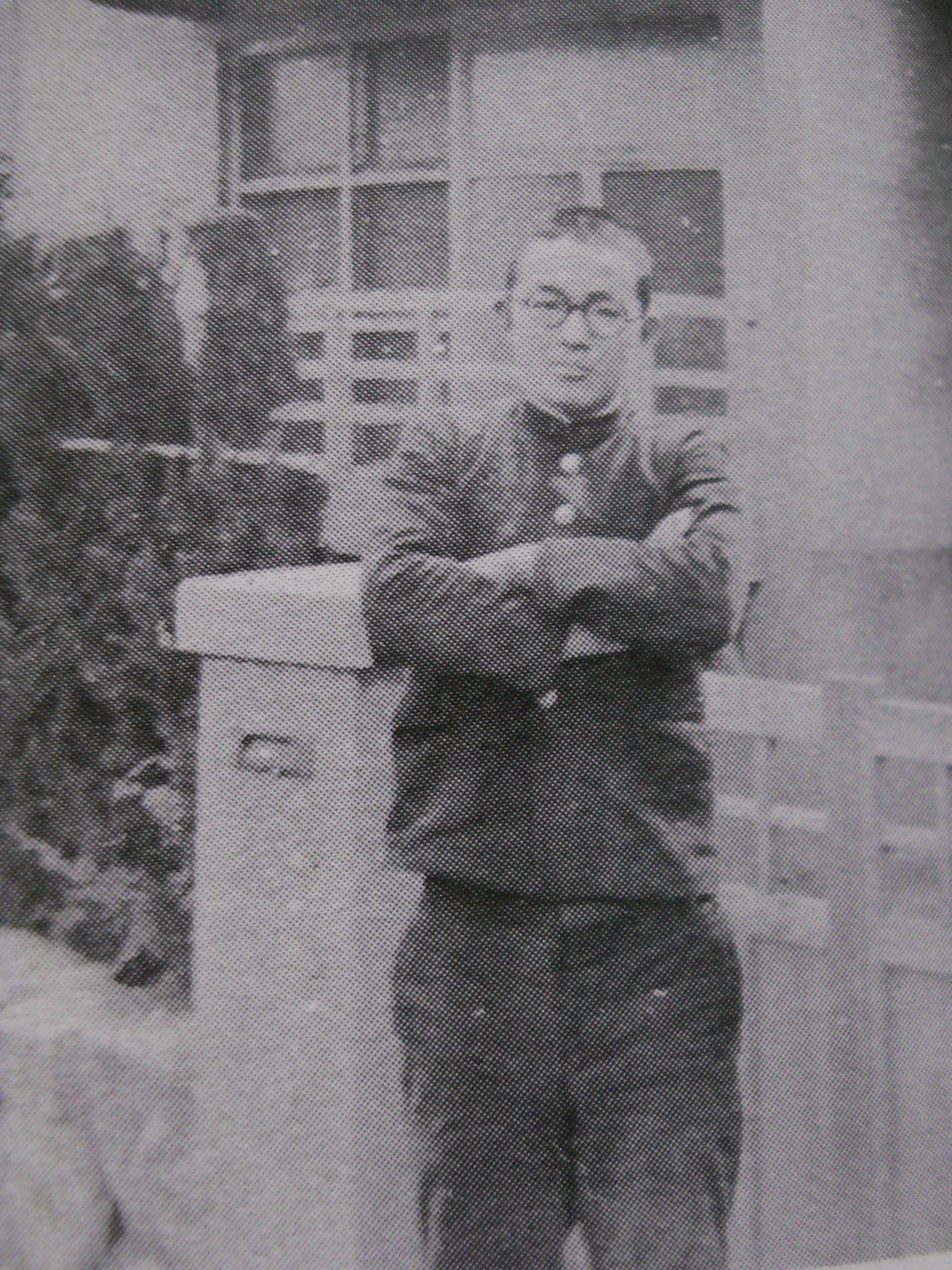
Shigeru Mizuki at age 18, c. 1940

Mizuki was born Shigeru Mura in the city of Osaka, the second of three sons. He was raised in the coastal city of Sakaiminato (境港), where he spent much of his childhood as a 'scrapper': picking fights and participating in childish warfare with the neighbouring children. He displayed from an early age a particular talent for art. During his time in elementary school, Mizuki's teachers were so impressed by his skills with a pencil that they organised an exhibition of his work, and he later went on to be featured in the Mainichi newspaper as something of an artistic prodigy. In addition to this penchant for the artistic, Mizuki had an interest in the supernatural – something that was fueled by listening to ghost stories told by a local woman named Fusa Kageyama, whom the young Mizuki nicknamed "Nonnonba".

However, in 1942, he was drafted into the Imperial Japanese Army and sent to New Britain Island in Papua New Guinea. His wartime experiences affected him greatly, as he contracted malaria, watched friends die from battle wounds and disease, and dealt with other horrors of war. Finally, in an Allied air raid, he was caught in an explosion and lost his left arm. Regarding this life-changing event, a November 30, 2015, NHK announcement of his death showed excerpts of a video interview with him at age 80, in which he said that as the only survivor of his unit, he was 'ordered to die' – a prospect he considered ridiculous. The result of Mizuki's wartime experience was a concurrent sense of pacifism and goodwill. In the same interview, he explained that his yōkai characters can be seen only in times of peace, not war, and that he purposely created these supernatural creatures to be of no specific ethnicity or nationality as a hint of the potential for humanity. While in a Japanese field hospital on Rabaul, he was befriended by the local Tolai tribespeople, who offered him land, a home, and citizenship via marriage to a Tolai woman. Mizuki acknowledged that he considered remaining behind, but was shamed by a military doctor into returning home to Japan first for medical treatment to his arm and to face his parents, which he did reluctantly.

=== Postwar life ===
Upon arriving home, Mizuki had initially planned to return to New Guinea; however, the occupation of Japan changed that. His injuries did little to help, nor did the fact that his older brother, an artillery officer, was convicted as a war criminal for having prisoners of war executed. Mizuki drifted between various jobs, including pedicab driving and fish selling, before studying briefly at Musashino Art University. He moved to Chōfu, Tokyo, where he remained until his death. He began his artistic career producing illustrations for kamishibai (paper theater), and later transitioned into manga as the medium shifted to mass publishing.

In 1957, Mizuki released his debut work as a professional manga artist at age 35, Rocketman. Much of his early work was derivative of American comics, particularly horror and superhero genres brought home by his father from the American consulate. Mizuki's pen name came from a superior insisting on calling him "Mizuki", based on the location of his residence, even after he explained that his surname was Mura. Mizuki decided that he liked "Mizuki" as a pen name.

Mizuki married his wife Nunoe in 1960 through an arranged marriage.

=== Breakthrough ===
His breakthrough came with the 1965 manga short story "Terebi-kun", which explored the relationship between children and consumer technology in an era of rapid economic growth.

The same year, he began to redo a series called Hakaba Kitarō (墓場鬼太郎; lit. 'Kitarō of the Graveyard'), which he had published as a rental manga adaptation of the kamishibai of the same name in 1960. In 1965, it was renamed Hakaba no Kitarō and began serialization in Weekly Shōnen Magazine, before being renamed again to GeGeGe no Kitarō in 1967. He achieved lasting fame with the series. Though early Kitarō stories were dark and political, the franchise eventually achieved widespread popularity and shaped the landscape of Japanese pop culture.

In 1972 he published the gekiga Nonnonba about his childhood friendship with old maid and his nanny, who impressed him with the yōkai stories.

In 1991, he released a short work titled War and Japan (Sensō to Nippon) published in The Sixth Grader, a popular edutainment magazine for young people, detailing the atrocities committed by the Japanese Army during their rampage in China and Korea and is narrated by Nezumi Otoko. The work serves as a counterpoint to revisionist manga like the works of Yoshinori Kobayashi and by extension a way for Mizuki to express his anger at those responsible for all of Japan's victims. From 1989 until 1998 he worked on Showa: A History of Japan, which follows the same approach and conveys Mizuki's view of the Shōwa era through a mixture of personal anecdotes and summaries of major historical events. His character Nezumi Otoko often appears as the narrator in these works.

In addition to his creative output, Mizuki was a prolific folklorist. His 12-volume series Mujara earned him membership in the Japanese Society of Cultural Anthropology. He also advocated for the Shōkeikan archive-museum, which documents the lives of disabled and wounded veterans.

=== Later life ===
In 2003, he returned to Rabaul to rekindle his friendship with the locals, who had named a road after him in his honor.

In 2005, Mizuki appeared in a cameo role in Yōkai Daisenso ("The Great Yokai War") directed by Takashi Miike, a film about yōkai inspired by his work as well as the work of Aramata Hiroshi. He appears towards the end of the film in the role of the Great Elder Yōkai: a pacifistic character who condemns the warring ways of the film's antagonist and reaffirms the role of yōkai as peaceful, playful creatures. A brief explanation about his works also is mentioned in the film. In 2010, NHK broadcast an asadora about his married life, Gegege no Nyōbō, based on his wife's autobiography.

Throughout most of his life, Mizuki's work was relatively unknown outside Japan due to not having been translated. This changed in the 2010s when translations in several European languages of his Showa, Kitaro, Nonnonba and Hitler series began to appear, leading to an increasing interest in Mizuki and his work (and that of his gekiga peers) among Westerners.

On November 30, 2015, Mizuki died of heart failure in a Tokyo hospital after collapsing at his home from a heart attack. His Dharma name is 大満院釋導茂 (Daiman-In-Shaku-Domo). He is buried at Kakusho-ji in Chofu, Tokyo.

== Style and themes ==
=== Working style ===
Mizuki's manga career was marked by extraordinary productivity, especially during the 1960s when he employed up to seven or eight assistants. These included future famous artists like Yoshiharu Tsuge and Ryoichi Ikegami. Tsuge, already an accomplished manga creator at the time, contributed ideas and even drew female characters for Mizuki, who struggled with depicting them himself. Assistants lived in rooms Mizuki added to the family house, and his wife would cook for everyone during busy periods.

Mizuki rarely read other people's manga, focusing instead on creating his own and conducting extensive research, even traveling abroad to study supernatural traditions. His studio was filled with books on global folklore, religion, dance, and especially ghosts and yōkai from various cultures.

=== Folklore and philosophy ===
His works drew heavily on folklore and supernatural subjects. In his numerous essays and illustrated catalogs, Mizuki frequently describes yōkai not simply as fictional creatures or cultural artifacts, but as phenomena that seek to take form and be perceived by humans. He famously asserted that such beings "want to take shape (katachi ni naritagatte iru)"; they desire to reveal their appearance (sugata) to people. According to Mizuki, yōkai possess a kind of agency: "As something that tries to take form, they hint by knocking on the brain of the artist or the sculptor," an action he equates with inspiration. Belief in the actual existence of yōkai and kami, he suggests, is essential for maintaining a connection to this imaginative realm: "The instant you believe [they are human-made], the yōkai or the kami will stop knocking on your brain."

Mizuki saw yōkai not merely as entertainment but as essential expressions of human sensitivity to the invisible and inexplicable. He often spoke of "kehai," a Japanese term meaning a vague presence or atmosphere, as central to the experience of encountering ghosts or spirits. As Mizuki explained, "Kehai always predicates the appearance of a ghost or specter... Without the feeling of fear, no ghost will make its presence known". He did not claim to see ghosts himself but to sense their kehai, which he then gave visual form through his art. His depictions were not limited to Japan. Mizuki drew on experiences in Papua New Guinea and Africa to illustrate how animistic worldviews give vivid form to the unseen. In many cultures, spirits inhabit masks, forests, and dances, confirming for Mizuki that "kehai flourishes in places where animism still lives". Mizuki described this process: "Since I'm not a musician, I'm not satisfied until something has a form. So I give form to kehai, and ghosts are the form I happen to have chosen".

Mizuki's approach suggests that yōkai are not only folkloric entities but affective, perceptual experiences. Illustrating them becomes a form of emotional expression, requiring what he calls a "yōkai sense". a heightened sensitivity to elusive presences that escape ordinary perception.

While Mizuki referred to folklorists like Kunio Yanagita and Toriyama Sekien, he also referred to the ghost stories he heard through oral tradition from "Nonnonba" as a child. Mizuki's recounting of her guidance is embedded in a sentimental haze: the otherworld she opens to him is already a thing of the past, inaccessible to modern adults and preserved only through memory and manga. As Foster suggests, Mizuki's role becomes that of a secondary medium, translating this bygone world to a readership increasingly distanced from it, both spatially and temporally. Some, like Kitarō and Medama-oyaji, are clearly his inventions and do not appear in his encyclopedic catalogs. Others, like Nurikabe and Sunakake-babaa, move fluidly between fiction and supposed folklore. Their inclusion in Mizuki's reference yōkai catalogs and encyclopedias lends them an aura of authority, even when their folkloric origins are tenuous.

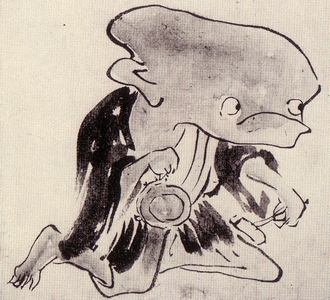
"Kamakura Wakamiya Hachiman Ginkgo Tree Ghost" from Yosa Buson's Buson yōkai emaki

One example is the Bake ichō no sei (ばけいちょうのせい, monster ginkgo spirit) or Bake ichō no rei (ばけいちょうのれい), a yōkai described by Mizuki as having a yellow face and limbs, wearing a kimono dyed with inkstick and striking a gong; in Japanese folklore, planting a Ginkgo biloba tree in a home garden is considered inauspicious and said to bring ill fortune. Mizuki draws this monster picture based on the "Kamakura Wakamiya Hachiman Ginkgo Tree Ghost" in Yosa Buson's Buson yōkai emaki. According to folklorist Goichi Yumoto, Buson's illustration is a depiction of an old tree spirit.

In later life, Mizuki created personal adaptations of Japanese literary classics, including Konjaku Monogatari and Tōno Monogatari. His version of Tōno Monogatari represents a blend of fidelity to Kunio Yanagita's text and Mizuki's emotional, fantastical style. Initially adhering closely to Yanagita's dry tone, Mizuki's expressive approach gradually overtakes the narrative.

=== Critique of modernization and nationalism ===
Mizuki was deeply interested in history, notably producing a multi-volume manga series on the Showa era. He was critical of the postwar modernization and industrialization of Japan, which he felt damaged the natural environment and disrupted traditional human relationships. He lamented the loss of this sensitivity in modern Japan, where industrialization and long work hours extinguished people's ability to perceive the mysterious: "In the past, life was interesting primarily because there was time enough to sense such things as kehai". His daughter described how he created essays and comics to advocate for a worldview in which humans are part of, and should respect, the natural world.

In Musume ni Kataru Otōsan no Senki (Papa's War Diary Told to His Daughters, 1995), Mizuki mixes folklore into his wartime experiences. Here, too, he encounters another "otherworld": a Papuan village near Rabaul that he describes in idyllic, even utopian, terms. The village is presented not merely as a geographical location but as a spiritual realm reminiscent of the Jōmon period or a fairyland. The local matriarch Ikarian becomes another Nonnonbā-like figure, and the villagers are imbued with otherworldly qualities, silent, generous, visible only to Mizuki, and ultimately restorative. When Mizuki smells the scent of a newborn from his healing stump, it marks not just physical recovery but a symbolic rebirth into this new, primal world. The account lacks sympathetic portrayals of fellow Japanese soldiers. The war is depicted as an experience of dehumanization, cruelty, and meaningless suffering, in contrast to the Papuan village's nurturing community. This dichotomy reinforces a central motif in Mizuki's broader oeuvre: the possibility of redemption or wholeness through connection to an otherworldly realm that lies outside the grasp of modernity and imperial violence.

Mizuki often appeared in his own manga as a comical, bespectacled character, injecting a playful self-awareness into his narratives. This figure, "Mizuki-san", contributed to a biographical mythology surrounding the artist, connecting his personal history with the nostalgic yōkai world he depicted.

Mizuki was politically outspoken. He critiqued Japanese militarism and nationalism, notably in his children's comic Japan and War and the publication of Showa during Japan's economic boom. He also addressed American imperialism in Kitarō's Vietnam War Diary. Several of his works touch upon World War II. His wartime manga Onward Towards Our Noble Deaths offers a semi-autobiographical portrayal of Japanese soldiers abandoned by their commanders and driven toward senseless death. He published a manga biography of Adolf Hitler.

In the 1960s Mizuki published several versions of Shiroi Hata (White Flag), a story of a Japanese Army lieutenant in World War II during the Battle of Iwo Jima, who raises the white flag of surrender in order to allow the troops under his command to survive. In 2026, NHK World-Japan released a documentary that examined the story and its place in Japanese history.

=== Visual style ===
Mizuki's work was known for its high level of visual detail, including patterns of tiny dots. His human figures are drawn with loose, open, and nearly collapsing lines, creating an effect of visual and existential indeterminacy. In contrast, his backgrounds and yōkai are rendered with obsessive detail, highlighting the vitality of the non-human world.

== Reception and legacy ==
By the 1960s, yōkai were largely regarded as outdated folklore with little relevance to modern urban life. Mizuki's work is credited with reviving public interest in traditional Japanese folklore and reshaping how yōkai are understood in modern culture, most notably through the series Gegege no Kitarō. His influence can be seen in franchises like Pokémon, Digimon, Spirited Away, My Neighbor Totoro, Neon Genesis Evangelion, and Bleach. Artist Takashi Murakami cited Mizuki as a formative influence.

His death was widely mourned in Japan and abroad. Obituaries appeared in major outlets including The New York Times, The Wall Street Journal, and the BBC. Tokyo-based journalist Jake Adelstein called him the "Voice of Japan's Conscience," and author Roland Kelts described him as a true sui generis, a unique artist beyond comparison.

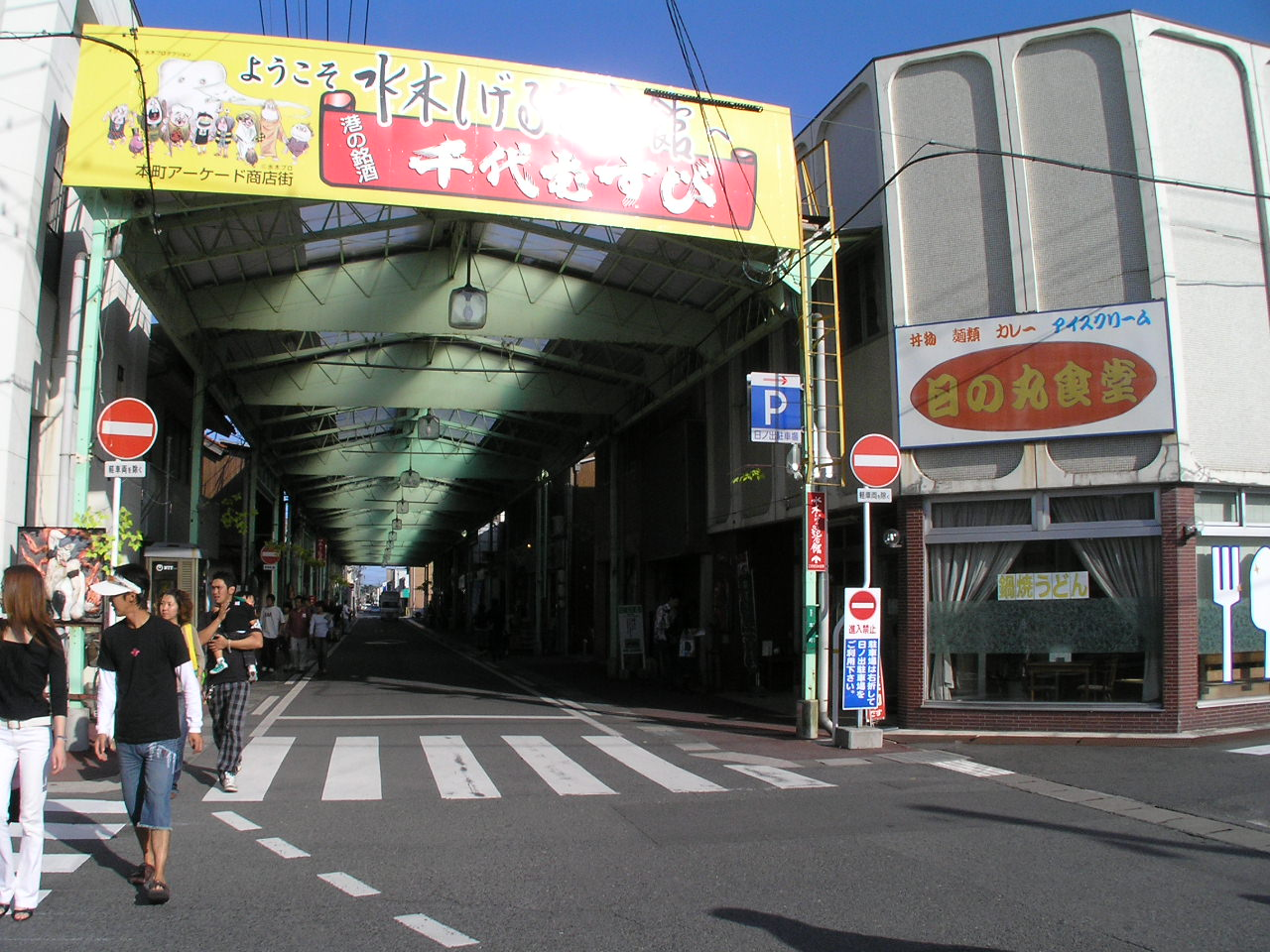
Mizuki Road

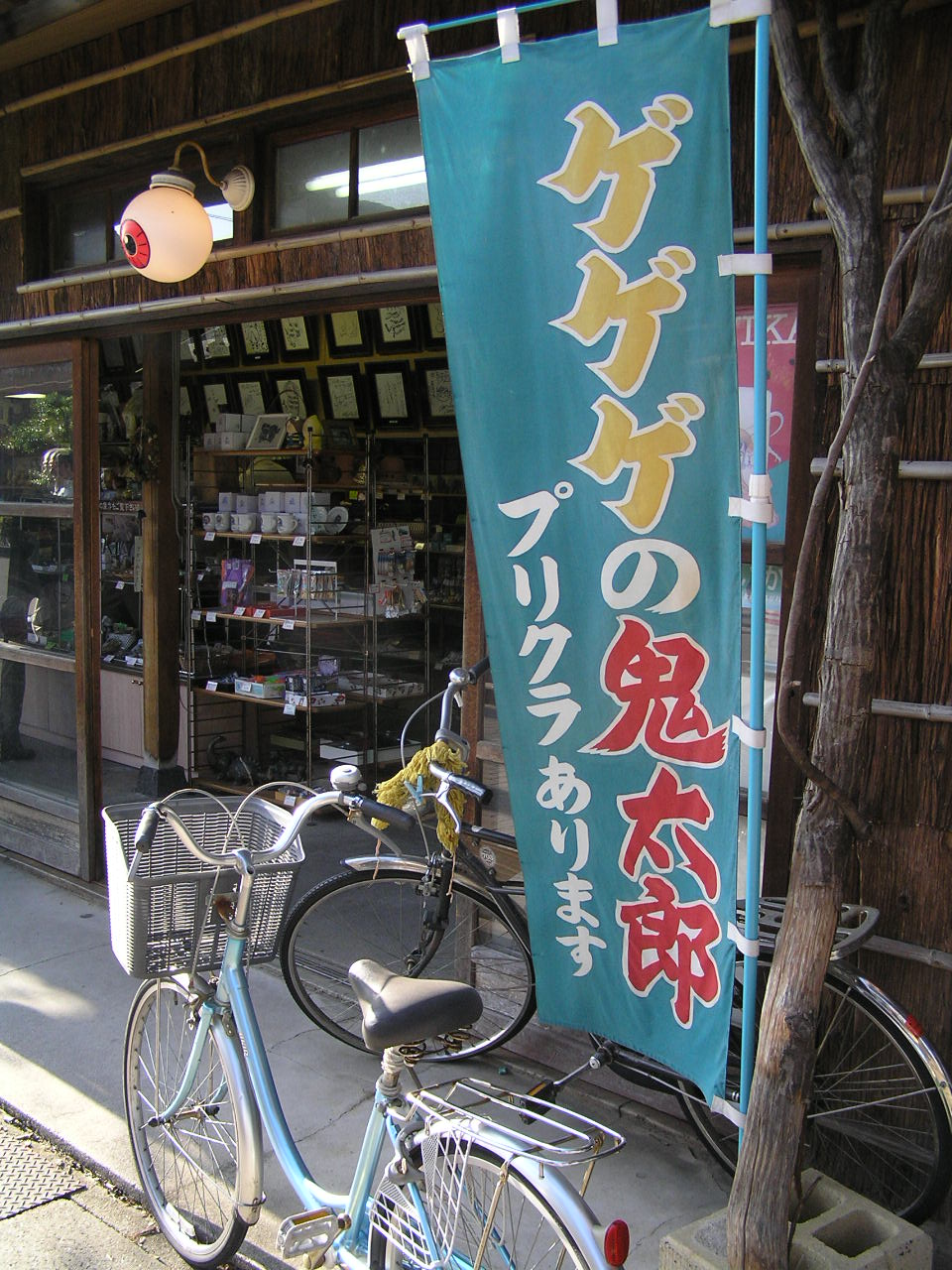
Mizuki Road

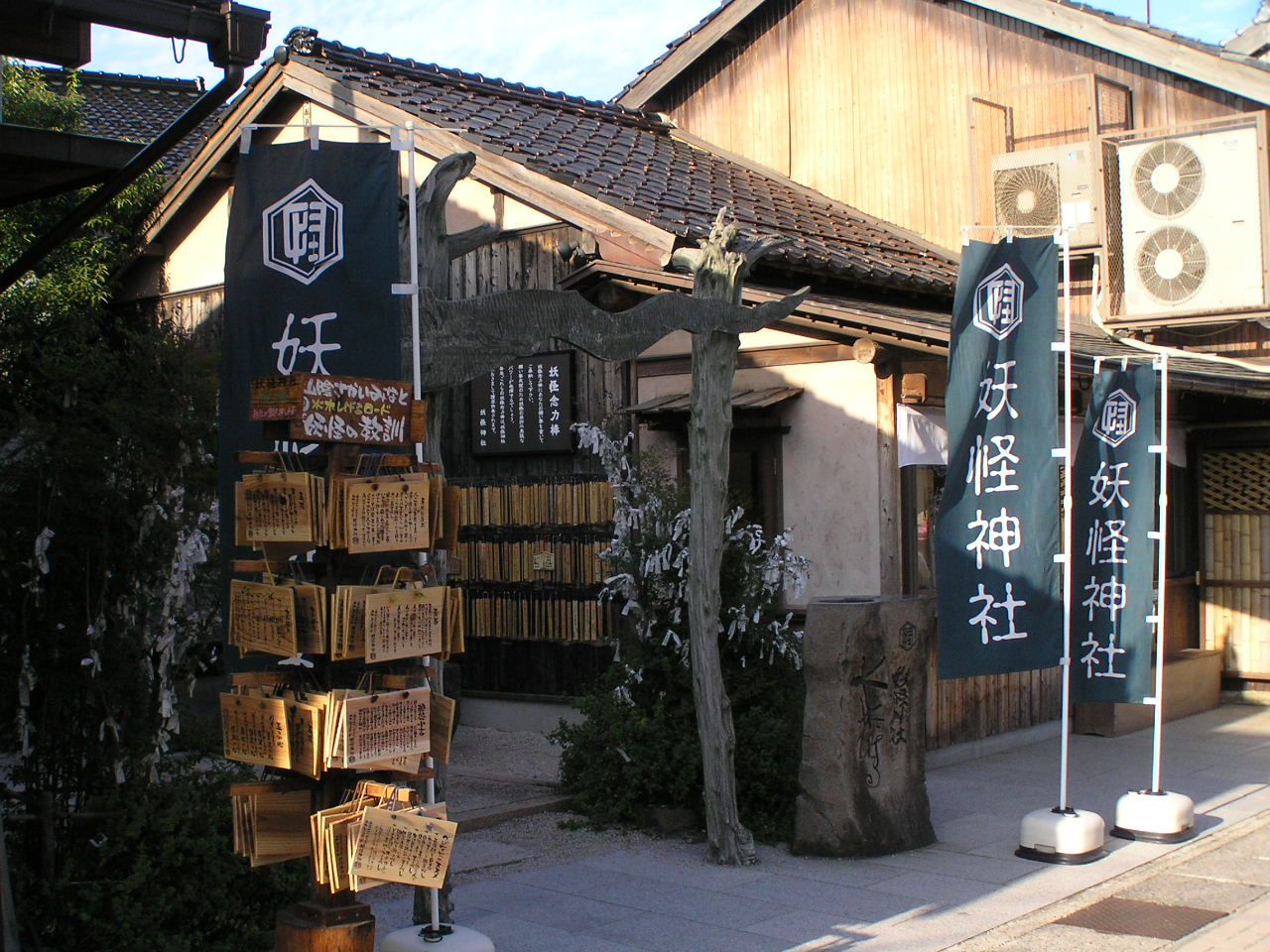
Mizuki Road

His impact extended into the 21st century, with live-action adaptations such as the 2007 Gegege no Kitarō film and Takashi Miike's 2005 blockbuster The Great Yōkai War.

The manga Death Note by Tsugumi Ohba and Takeshi Obata used the same idea as his one-shot manga The Miraculous Notebook (不思議な手帖, Fushigina Techō; 1973) about a notebook that killed whoever's name was written in it. Although this fact is a coincidence, Ohba has stated he did not have any particular inspiration for his story.

Sakaiminato, Mizuki's childhood home, has a street dedicated to the ghosts and monsters that appear in his stories. One hundred bronze statues of the story's characters line both sides of the road. There is also a museum featuring several of his creations and works.

Mizuki has won numerous awards and accolades for his works, especially GeGeGe no Kitarō. Among these are:

- 1965 Received Kodansha Jido Manga Award for Terebi-kun (テレビくん?).
- 1990 Received Kodansha Manga Award for Komikku Shōwa-Shi.
- 1991 Received Shiju Hōshō Decoration.
- 1995 For the 6th Annual Tokyo Peace Day, he was awarded with an exhibition of his paintings, entitled "Prayer for Peace: Shigeru Mizuki War Experience Painting Exhibition"
- 1996 Received Minister of Education Award.
- 1996 His hometown of Sakaiminato honored him with the Shigeru Mizuki Road, a street decorated with bronze statues of his Ge Ge Ge no Kitaro characters and other designs relating to his works.
- 2003 Received Kyokujitsu Shō Decoration.
- 2003 Sakaiminato honored him again with the Shigeru Mizuki International Cultural Center.
- 2003 Tezuka Osamu Cultural Prize Special Award for his works.
- 2007 Received the Best Comic Book award for NonNonBā at the Angoulême International Comics Festival.
- 2008 Asahi Prize for contribution to the manga comic culture through portrayals of the horrors of war.
- 2010 Received the Person of Cultural Merit award.
- 2011 Received the Honorary Citizen of Tokyo commendation. Recognized by Emperor Akihito, Empress Michiko, Crown prince Naruhito, Crown Prince Fumihito, and Crown Princess Kiko at the Imperial Garden Party held by the Imperial Household Agency.
- 2012 Received the Eisner Award for Onward Towards Our Noble Deaths, in the category Best U.S. Edition of International Material – Asia. The award was shared with translator Zack Davisson

== Selected works ==
=== Manga ===
Title	Year	Notes	Refs
Rocketman (ロケットマン)	1957	Published in 1958 by Togetsu Shobō	
Hakaba Kitarō (墓場鬼太郎; lit. 'Kitarō of the Graveyard')	1960–1964	Published by Togetsu Shobō	
Kappa no Sanpei (河童の三平)	1961–1962	Published by Togetsu Shobō	
Akuma-kun (悪魔くん)	1963–1964	Published by Tōkōsha	
Shiroi Hata (White Flag)	1964–1968	Published in three different manga stories	
"Terebi-kun" (テレビくん)	1965	Published in Bessatsu Shōnen Magazine	
Hakaba no Kitarō (墓場の鬼太郎)	1965–1967	Serialized in Weekly Shōnen Magazine	
"Wakusei" (惑星)	1966	Published in Garo	
Kitarō Yawa (鬼太郎夜話)	1967–1969	Serialized in Garo; Published in French as Micmac aux enfers in 1 vol.	
GeGeGe no Kitarō (ゲゲゲの鬼太郎)	1967–1969	Serialized in Weekly Shōnen Magazine; Published in English	
Hitler (劇画ヒットラー, Gekiga Hittorā)	1971	Serialized in Manga Sunday; Published in English	
Onward Towards Our Noble Deaths (総員玉砕せよ!, Sōin Gyokusai Seyo!)	1973	Published by Kodansha in 1 vol. Published in English	
"The Miraculous Notebook" (不思議な手帖, Fushigina Techō)	1973	Published in Comic Mystery	
Showa: A History of Japan (コミック昭和史, Komikku Shōwa-shi)	1988–1989	Published by Kodansha in 8 vol. Published in English	
"War and Japan"	1991	Published in Shogaku rokunen-sei Translated into English online by scholar Matthew Penney	
NonNonBa (のんのんばあとオレ, Nonnonba to Ore)	1992	Published by Kodansha in 2 vol. Published in English	
Boku no Isshō wa GeGeGe no Rakuen da (ボクの一生はゲゲゲの楽園だ)	2001	Published by Kodansha in 6 vol. Published in French and German	
Tono Monogatari (水木しげるの遠野物語, Mizuki Shigeru no Tōno Monogatari)	2008–2009	Serialized in Big Comic; Published by Shogakukan in 1 vol. Published in English	
Watashi no Hibi (わたしの日々, "My Days")	2014–2015	Serialized in Big Comic	

=== Books ===
- Colorized Yōkai Gadan, 1992, published by Iwanami Shinsho
- Shigeru Mizuki's Yōkai Artbook: Mujara, 1998
- Mizuki, Shigeru. 水木しげるの日本妖怪めぐり (Hepburn: Mizuki Shigeru no Nihon Yōkai Meguri, lit. "Shigeru Mizuki's Japanese Ghost Tour".)
- Rabauru Senki (Memories of Rabaul)
- Mizuki, Shigeru. "Graphic World of Japanese Phantoms". 講談社, 1985. ISBN 978-4-06-202381-8 (4-06-202381-4)
- Yokaï, Éditions Cornélius, 2017, full color, hardcover, 80 pages. Illustration book.
- À l'intérieur des yôkai, 2018, bi-color, hardcover, 80 pages. Éditions Cornélius. (in French)
- À l'intérieur de Kitaro, hors d'oeuvre publication, bi-color, 16 pages, 2018. Éditions Cornélius. (in French)

== Literature ==
- 40th Artistic Anniversary, 1990, published by Kagomesha
