= Shigeru Mizuki's Hitler =

Japanese manga series

Shigeru Mizuki's Hitler, originally titled Gekiga Hitler (劇画ヒットラー, Gekiga Hittorā), is a manga by Shigeru Mizuki about the life of Adolf Hitler. In 1971 it began serialization in Weekly Manga Sunday. In November 2015, it was published in English by Drawn & Quarterly, translated by Zack Davisson. The English version was a translation of a version in French rather than a direct translation from Japanese.

== Contents ==
Olivier Sava of The A.V. Club, wrote that Hitler is portrayed as he actually was, and as he deludely saw himself; in regards to the former, Sava characterizes that version of Hitler as "dopey, sad, and often pathetic" and that he "looks distraught even when he's whistling with pleasure, suggesting that its impossible for the man to be truly happy when so much of his life is fueled by hate." Davin Arul of The Star, a Malaysian publication, stated that it uses Mizuki's "trademark style of putting almost sketchily-drawn cartoon characters in realistic, highly-detailed settings".

The beginning and the end of the book refer to the Holocaust. Arul wrote that the Holocaust in this graphic novel is "used as a bookend and does not figure too much in between – possibly because Mizuki did not want the magnitude of it to eclipse the rest of his story." Jan-Paul Koopman of Der Spiegel also argued that the Holocaust is not given much attention in the book.

The book has a two-page list of dramatis personae at the front of the book and, in the English version, a footnote index in the back that has fifteen pages.

== Release ==
The serialization in Weekly Manga Saturday began on May 8 and ended on August 28. On March 1, 1972, it was released as a single volume.

In 2014 Drawn & Quarterly announced it was going to release an English translation.

The book was published in Germany in 2019, with Reprodukt as the publisher. Jens Balzer wrote a foreword for the German version.

== Reception ==
Publishers Weekly described it as a "fresh take". It was ranked as a "Publishers Weekly Pick", and the work stated that it is "a candidate for the year's best graphic novel."

Davin Arul wrote that a reader gets accustomed to the cartoonish art style despite it being initially "really jarring". Arul stated that the work is highly complex due to the amount of detail and that can "lose the reader".

== See also ==
- Bibliography of Adolf Hitler
- Adolf Hitler in popular culture
