= Showa: A History of Japan =

Japanese manga series

- Cover of the first publication

コミック昭和史 (Komikku Shōwa-shi)
- Genre: Historical
- Manga
- Written by: Shigeru Mizuki
- Published by: Kodansha
- English publisher: NA: Drawn & Quarterly
- Original run: 1988 – 1989
- Volumes: 8

Showa: A History of Japan, known in Japan as Comic Showa-shi (Japanese: コミック昭和史, Hepburn: Komikku Shōwa-shi; lit. 'A Comics History of the Showa Era'), is a Japanese manga series written and illustrated by Shigeru Mizuki. An autobiographical work, it describes the author's experiences growing up during the Shōwa period. Mizuki served in the Japanese army, and his series is critical of Japanese and American militarism.

== Release ==
The manga was originally released by Kodansha as Shōwa-shi: Comic (昭和史: コミック, Shōwa-shi: Komikku) between November 1988 and December 1989. The manga was republished as Comic Showa-shi by Kodansha from August 1, to November 4, 1994, and a box with all the eight volumes was released on December 14, 1994. An adaptation titled Kamishibai Shōwa-shi (紙芝居昭和史; lit. 'A Kamishibai Story of the Showa Era') was written by Kōji Kata and published on August 19, 2004, by Iwanami Shoten.

In February 2013, Drawn & Quarterly announced it would publish the manga under the title Showa: A History of Japan. The company released Showa 1926–1939 in October 2013, Showa 1939–1944 in May 2014, Showa 1944–1953 in November 2014, and Showa 1953–1989 in September 2015.

== Reception ==
It received the 1989 Kodansha Manga Award for the general category. In 2014 and 2016, respectively, the first edition and the fourth edition of Showa published by Drawn & Quarterly were nominated by the Harvey Awards in the category "Best American Edition of Foreign Material". It was also nominated at the Eisner Award in the category Best U.S. Edition of International Material—Asia in 2014 for Showa 1926–1939, and it won it in 2015 and 2016 for Showa 1939–1944 and Showa 1953–1989 respectively.

Comics critic Paul Gravett elected Showa: A History of Japan the third best manga published in North America in 2014, asking "What a better way to tell an epic modern history lesson than in these multi-layered, accessible manga?"

Ian Scheffler of the Los Angeles Times praised the "knack for narrative" and "ability to convey the mood of a nation" expressed by the author.
