= Peach Momoko =

Japanese comic book artist and writer

Peach Momoko 桃桃子
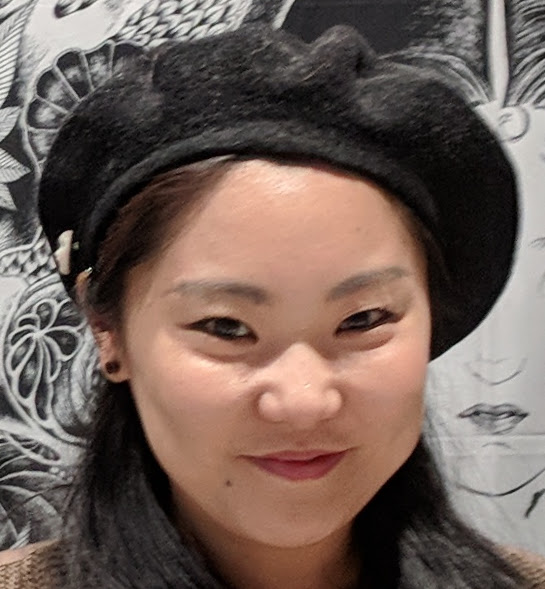
- Momoko in 2018
- Born: 25 February Kumagaya, Saitama Prefecture, Japan
- Area: Artist
- Notable works: The Momoko-verse; Spider-Gwen: Shadow Clones; Ultimate X-Men; Sai: Dimensional Rivals
- Awards: Eisner Award for Best Cover Artist (2021 & 2024); Ringo Award (2021)
- Spouse: Yo Mutsu (Japanese: 陸奥陽)

Peach Momoko (桃桃子, Momoko; Japanese: [mo̞.mo̞.ko̞]) is a pseudonymous Japanese comic book artist and writer. After signing an exclusive deal with Marvel Comics as part of their Stormbreakers program, she was awarded both the Eisner Award and Ringo Award for best cover artist. With Marvel, she launched the "Momoko-verse", a line of comics at Marvel that reimagines the Marvel Universe within the lens of Japanese folktales, and she wrote and illustrated Ultimate X-Men, reimagining the X-Men for the Ultimate Universe, and Sai: Dimensional Rivals.

== Biography ==
=== Personal life ===
Peach Momoko was born in Japan's Saitama Prefecture. As a child, she lived in the cities of Kumagaya and Gyōda. Her father attended photography school and enjoyed painting, and her grandfather was an oil painter.

Momoko attended school for video game design, during which time she realized that she wanted a career making illustrations. Devised during her art school years, the Peach Momoko pseudonym was the result of the artist "goofing around" with some of her friends. In 2009, she used the Peach Momoko pseudonym for an exhibition in Japan, and continued to use the name in the summer of 2010 when she moved to Portland, Oregon.

Momoko returned to Japan around September 2013. As of June 2021, Momoko was living with her husband and art manager, Yo Mutsu (Japanese: 陸奥陽), and their pet dog, Momo.

=== Career ===
Though claiming that no specific influence inspired her to become an artist, Momoko admits that seeing Atsushi Kaneko's works as a high school student is when she decided to become an illustrator.

In 2008, Momoko was invited to participate in a group gallery exhibition that would take place in America during June of that year. She was hesitant to accept, since she would have to quit her publishing company job to stay in the United States for a month. In 2010, Momoko and her husband collaborated on a live painting mural at the Peoples Art of Portland Gallery. In 2013, Momoko began placing her art on t-shirts, noting that this would be a means for collectors to more affordably purchase her work. In April 2014, Momoko participated in her first European gallery exhibition, the multi-artist showcase "1st NSK Folk Art Biennale: NSK: Past - Present – Future // 1984 – 2014 – 2045" organized by Neue Slowenische Kunst in Leipzig, Germany.

After graduating from art school, Momoko was an editor at a pornographic magazine, and she had uncredited illustrations published in the horoscope section of a 2008 issue of the Sunaipā Eve (Japanese: スナイパーEve; lit. transl. Sniper Eve) femdom magazine. She considers her first published comic book work to be her illustrations for the Winter 2013 and Spring 2014 issues of Girls and Corpses magazine.

In early 2015, Momoko participated in her first Japanese conventions, the manga marketplace Comitia and the art-oriented Artism Market. In October 2015, Momoko had her first exposure to comic conventions when she joined Girls and Corpses’ owner Robert Steven Rhine at Comikaze, where he introduced her to an editor at Heavy Metal. Afterwards, Momoko was invited to participate in Heavy Metal’s 40th-anniversary art exhibition, and met with Grant Morrison and other editors at the magazine who offered to publish short stories written and illustrated by her, resulting in short features which appearing in issues 288 and 290. Momoko has referred to these pieces as "short story sequential pin-up style" art.

In August 2016, Momoko participated in Portland's annual Forest for the Trees public art project, creating a mural at Cider Riot (807 NE Couch Street). In 2017, to commemorate Miyavi's 15th year as a solo artist, Momoko was selected to create an official t-shirt design for the musician. In 2018, Momoko collaborated with lifestyle brand HVYBLK on a t-shirt that was available at that year's Anime Expo. That same year, Momoko created official t-shirts for the Japanese television series Moonlight Mask (月光仮面, Gekkō Kamen) and Red Baron (レッドバロン, Reddo Baron).

In 2018, Momoko created the cover illustration for the German Blu-ray + DVD "Mediabook" release of the Japanese splatter film Kodoku: Meatball Machine. That year, she participated in several fine art gallery exhibitions and conventions, including Armageddon Expo (New Zealand), Chicago Comic & Entertainment Expo (USA), Emerald City Comic Con (USA), Fantasy Basel (Switzerland), Lucca Comics & Games (Italy), Monsterpalooza (USA), New York Comic Con (USA), and Singapore Comic Con (Singapore). She also attended Silicon Valley Comic Con in April of that year.

Comic book artist Adi Granov introduced Momoko to Marvel Comics and aided her entrance into the comic book industry. Momoko's first comic book illustration for a major publisher was a variant cover for Marvel Comics' Marvel Rising #1 (March 2019). Momoko contributed eleven illustrations for the base set of the 2019 Upper Deck Flair Marvel trading card series and illustrated the entire 90-card base set of the 2020 Upper Deck Marvel Anime trading card series.

In 2019, Momoko worked with the card series Magic the Gathering to create a Secret Lair drop featuring her art work across 5 different cards.

In late 2020, Momoko signed an exclusive deal to Marvel as part of Marvel's Stormbreakers line-up of rising star artists. She was however allowed to finish up her prior agreements and continues to provide variant covers for various creator-owned titles.

In 2021, Marvel Comics launched Momoko's Demon Days series, creating what the artist referred to as her "Momoko-verse", a setting which reimagined the company's superhero characters within the framework of Japanese folktales. Demon Days was published as a series of five one-shot issues before being collected as a trade paperback in May 2022. In April 2022, a sequel to Demon Days was announced, titled Demon Wars, which adapts Marvel's Civil War storyline within the Momoko-verse framework.

In October 2022, Momoko made her first appearance at New York Comic Con. The line for her free autographs was the longest among all visiting artists, and the high demand for her signature prompted a conflict among retailers who were competing in line before the show's opening on the final day. Momoko was forced to leave her table and cancel signings to alleviate the conflict.

In December 2022, Momoko designed the titular clones of Spider-Gwen Stacy of the then-forthcoming 2023 limited series Spider-Gwen: Shadow Clones.

In April 2023, Momoko created the artwork for the single "Perfect" by Japanese rapper Maria.

In October 2023 at New York Comic Con Marvel revealed that, following the conclusion of Ultimate Invasion and the creation of a brand new Ultimate Universe, the comic Ultimate X-Men would launch in March 2024 written and illustrated by Momoko.

In November 2023, Momoko released the one-shot Star Wars: Visions - Peach Momoko #1, which kicked off a series of comic book releases which carry on the Star Wars: Visions concept. Regarding Star Wars Visions, Momoko told StarWars.com, "I really enjoy thinking about how to tell my own version of Star Wars, while keeping in mind the concepts of the original universe."

In March 2023. Momoko produced a series of Women's History Month variant covers for Marvel's' entire line of Star Wars titles. In March 2025, Momoko created a series of kimono-themed covers for Marvel characters.

In October 2025, it was announced that Momoko's version of Psylocke, called Sai in the Momoko-verse, would receive her own series in 2026, written and illustrated by Momoko and Stan Sakai. The series will run five issues and is titled Sai: Dimensional Rivals in connection with the character's appearance in the Marvel Rivals video game.

== Artistic style ==
=== Aesthetic ===
Her aesthetic has been likened to the bishōjo ("beautiful girl") cultural phenomenon in Japan, though she uses this imagery to "fuse the power of a girl with her inner madness, weaponry, and propaganda".

Momoko prefers to tell stories involving samurai, Japanese folktales, dreamlike situations, and the real-life problems of adolescents. In her early career, she chose to "only illustrate the females in my artwork", noting how the viewer "can not tell by the expressions if they are dead, or if they are alive". Momoko often envisions her work in color but draws in black-and-white, focusing on the balance and contrast between light and shadow. After living in the United States, Momoko's early work introduced "many historical, social[,] and economic symbols and implications about Japan" in order to provide "a Japanese perspective on Japanese society".

In June 2015, Momoko stated she was conflicted about if she was an illustrator or a painter, leading her to question "who I am [as an artist], but now I think that's fine". Early in her professional career, Momoko's work was attributed as being inspired by early 20th century Japanese ad design filtered though a dark sense of humor. Her main motifs from this time are noted to be contrasting the images of women and death.

As she continued to work in American comics, her approach to female imagery began to blend different qualities of femininity: "When I try to draw an erotic pose or situation, it ends up becoming more about the confidence and strength of the character, so I guess those qualities are the same in my eyes."

=== Inspirations ===
Momoko has stated that her art is primarily inspired by several genres of Japanese cinema, specifically horror, military, and pink films, as well as various styles of music. Music in particular is very important to Momoko and often times will find songs to fit her mood allowing her to paint how she feels. Momoko has stated that when she is stuck on ideas that she tends to watch murder case documentary films. She also draws inspiration from the line work of tattoo artists. Since her childhood, she feels she has been strongly influenced by watching Studio Ghibli films.

Prior to living the United States, Momoko valued the style of American comic books and did not appreciate most Japanese styles of art, but changed her views while living outside of Japan. At that time, she began to appreciate Japanese folk art from the 1960s and 1970s. In 2018, Momoko believed that she did "not have a set [art] style" as it could limit her client reach, but she believed herself to be inspired by Japanese nostalgia and ad design from the 1960s to 1980s.

== Exhibitions ==
=== Solo ===
- Tadaima Nihon-ten (Japanese: ただいま日本展; lit. transl. I'm home in Japan) at the Vanilla Gallery, Tokyo, Japan (April 13–18, 2015)
- Peach Momoko Pop Up at the Hellion Gallery, Portland, OR, USA (September 14–30, 2013)
- Peach MoMoKo at The Lovecraft, Portland, OR, USA (October 2012)
- Beautiful and Disturbing at the Hellion Gallery, Portland, OR, USA (April 7–30, 2011)

=== Group ===
- Guillermo del Toro: Inspirations, Curiosities & Other Oddities at the Copro Gallery, Santa Monica, CA, USA (October 7–28, 2017)
- Heavy Metal 40th Anniversary Art Show at the Copro Gallery, presented in partnership with Heavy Metal Magazine, Santa Monica, CA, USA (July 15 – August 19, 2017)
- Dreamworks Voltron Legendary Defender at the Hero Complex Gallery, Los Angeles, CA, USA (June 2016)
- Disney's Alice Through The Looking Glass Art Showcase at the Hero Complex Gallery, presented in partnership with Disney Fine Art by Collectors Editions, Los Angeles, CA, USA (May 2016)
- Permanence at the Haven Gallery, Newport, NY, USA (February 2016)
- Shōjo no Shuchō (Japanese: 少女の主張; lit. transl. Girl's Claim) at the Vanilla Gallery, Tokyo, Japan (February 8–20, 2016) (Note: Though denoted as a "Solo Show" on Momoko's official website, the gallery's description elaborates that it was a Peach Momoko exhibition that included four other artists — Damien Glonek & Ed Long, Senno Knife, and Tomizaki Nori — paying homage to her dark bishōjo aesthetic.)
- Art Not Image at the Hellion Gallery, Portland, OR, USA (February 2016)
- Horumon Shinkō e no Sasoi (Japanese: ホルモン信仰への誘い; lit. transl. Invitation to Hormonal Beliefs) at the Sōzō Gini-jō Jite Gyararī Bar (Japanese: 騒ギニ乗ジテGallery Bar; lit. transl. Noisy Gini Riding Jite Gallery Bar), Osaka, Japan (August 21–29, 2015)
- The First Annual Ema Show at the Hellion Gallery, Portland, OR, USA (March 5–7, 2015) and the HPGRP Gallery, Tokyo, Japan (March 13–23, 2015) (Note: Momoko's original contribution to this traveling exhibition sold while on display in the United States, so she made a new piece to exhibit during the Japan-half of The First Annual Ema Show.)
- The Art Fair +Plus -Ultra at the Spiral, Tokyo, Japan (October 2014)
- 1st NSK Folk Art Biennale: NSK: Past - Present – Future // 1984 – 2014 – 2045 at Spinnerei, Leipzig, Germany (April 2014)
- Seriously Graphic at the Gallery Zero, Portland, OR, USA (May 4–26, 2013)
- Raw: Underground at the Bossanova Ballroom, Portland, OR, USA (March 2013)
- Big 300 at the Goodfoot Gallery, Portland, OR, USA (December 2012)
- I am, there for I think at the Goodfoot Gallery, Portland, OR, USA (October 25 – November 28, 2012)
- FanFare: The Art of Science Fiction and Fantasy at the Peoples Art of Portland Gallery, Portland, OR, USA (August 18 – September 9, 2012)
- PSY at Alberta Street Fair via The Lovecraft, Portland, OR, USA (April 26, 2012)
- Horror Artists Around the World: Horror Art for your Xmas Gift at The Lovecraft, Portland, OR, USA (December 2–31, 2011)
- 88 Strong at the Goodfoot Gallery, Portland, OR, USA (September 2011)
- The 2nd Annual New Brow of Portland at the Portland Center for the Performing Arts, Portland, OR, USA (September 2011)
- The Scorpio Show at the PoBoy Art Gallery, Portland, OR, USA (November 2010)
- I Sekai Chinmi Hyakkei (Japanese: 異世界珍味百景; lit. transl. 100 Different World Delicacies) at the Design Festa Gallery, Tokyo, Japan (November 21–27, 2009)

== Awards and honors ==
In January 2015, Momoko's Surface (Japanese: 面, Hepburn: Men) illustration was selected for publication in the Infected By Art, Volume 3 art book.

In the Autumn 2015 issue of Quarterly S (Japanese: 季刊エス, Hepburn: Kikan Esu), Momoko received a StarS award for her illustration titled Destruction and Regeneration (Japanese: 破壊と再生, Hepburn: Hakai to Saisei). In January 2016, the same illustration received the Gold Award in the Pen/Ink/Pencil category of the fourth Infected By Art competition.

In 2021, Momoko received the Eisner Award for Best Cover Artist based on her single issue work on Buffy the Vampire Slayer #19, Mighty Morphin #2, Something Is Killing the Children #12, Power Rangers #1, her series work on The Crow: Lethe, Die!namite, and Vampirella, and her variant cover work for Marvel Comics.

In 2024, Momoko won the Eisner Award for Best Cover Artist a second time. This time for a cover in a series that she created Demon Wars: Scarlet Sin and for various alternate covers of other Marvel works.

== Bibliography ==
=== As penciller or writer/penciller ===
- Demon Days Treasury Edition (5-issue comic series collection, March 2022, Marvel Comics)
- The Official Horizon Zero Dawn Peach Momoko Poster Portfolio (24-page poster portfolio, December 2021, Titan Books Limited, ISBN 978-1-78773-796-9)
- Marvel Portfolio: Peach Momoko (12-sheet portfolio, March 2021, Marvel Comics, ISBN 978-1-302-92832-2)
- Peach MoMoKo: The Variant Covers (20-page digital-only cover art collection, December 2020, Marvel Comics, [ISBN unspecified])
- "Tohko" (short comic story in Heavy Metal #290, June 2018, Heavy Metal Media LLC, EAN 0-92567-36587-6 35>)
- KaiGun (Japanese: 絵軍; transl. Military of Art) (art book, December 2017, 60 Brigade Books, ISBN 0-893700-002265)
- "Shaman Himiko" (short comic story in Heavy Metal #288, November 2017, Heavy Metal Media LLC, EAN 0-92567-36587-6 10>)
- Rei rei-shi-tachi (Japanese: 〇〇子たち; transl. The OOko) (60-page art book, June 2016, 60 Brigade Books, ISBN 0-893700-002272)
- Star Wars: Visions - Peach Momoko #1. Marvel Comics. ISBN 75960620810400111
- MoMoKo (Japanese: 桃桃子; lit. transl. Peach) (44-page art book, April 2014, [publisher unspecified], ISBN 0-893700-002256)
- Ultimate X-Men (Vol. 2) #1–24
- Marvel Rivals: Ignite
- Captain America Anniversary Tribute #1 Redrawing of Captain America comics #1 (page 4)
- Elektra: Black, White & Blood #4
- Extreme Venomverse #4
- Marvel Zombies: Black, White & Blood #3
- Star Wars: Darth Vader – Black, White & Red #1
- Miracleman #0
- Demon Wars (4-issue comic series collection, April 2024, Marvel Comics)
- Sai: Dimensional Rivals #1–5

=== Backup stories as penciller ===
- Women Of Marvel (2021) Lady Deathstrike 1-page back-up story.
- Emily and Catbeast (1-page back-up comic segment in Strange Academy Presents: The Death of Doctor Strange #1, November 2021, Marvel Comics, UPC 759606202027 00111)

=== Cover work ===
- A.X.E.: Eve of Judgment (Marvel Unlimited and SDCC 2022 Variants)
- A.X.E.: Judgment Day #1-6
- A.X.E.: Judgment Day Omega
- Aero #4
- Age of X-Man: Apocalypse and the X-Tracts #2
- Alien #1
- Aliens: What If...? #1
- All-New Venom #4
- All-Out Avengers #2-3
- Alpha Flight #5
- Amazing Fantasy #2, 1000
- The Amazing Spider-Man (Vol. 5) #46, 49, 56, 70-71, 74, #78.BEY, 85, 92
- The Amazing Spider-Man (Vol. 6) #1, 5-6, 14, 26, 32, 40, 47-48, 70
- The Amazing Spider-Man (Vol. 7) #1, 5-6 (Marvel Rivals Variants)
- Ant-Man #3
- Archie Halloween Spectacular 2020
- Aster of Pan #2
- Atmos Exordium #1
- The Avengers (Vol. 8) #44, 46, 55, 63
- The Avengers (Vol. 9) #8, 24, 30
- Avengers: Tech-On #1-6
- Avengers: Twilight #1
- Batman: Black and White #1 (Cover C)
- Batman: Killing Time #1 (Cover E)
- Batman: The Adventures Continue #1-2, 4-5
- Battleworld #1 (NYCC 2025 Variant)
- Betsy Braddock: Captain Britain #1
- Big Girls #1
- Bitter Root: The Next Movement #2 (Cover C)
- Black Cat (Vol. 2) #2, 8
- Black Cat (Vol. 3) #1
- Black Cloak #1 (Cover D)
- Black Knight: Curse of the Ebony Blade #1
- Black Panther (Vol. 7) #25
- Black Panther (Vol. 8) #12
- Black Panther (Vol. 9) #7
- Black Widow (Vol. 8) #1, 13, 15
- Blackwood: The Mourning After #3
- Blade (Vol. 4) #1, 6
- Blade Runner 2029 #1-4
- Blade Runner: Origins #1-2
- Blood Hunt #1-5
- Bloodline: Daughter of Blade #2
- The Boys: Dear Becky #2
- Bring on the Bad Guys: Doom #1 (Marvel Rivals Variant)
- Bug Wars #1
- Canto II: The Hollow Men #1
- Captain America (Vol. 12) #4
- Captain America: Symbol of Truth #2
- Captain Marvel (Vol. 10) #16, 30, 37, 44, 46-47
- Captain Marvel (Vol. 11) #3
- Captain Marvel: The End #1
- Carnage (Vol. 3) #6 (NYCC 2022 Variant)
- Carnage (Vol. 4) #2
- Carnage: Black, White & Blood #1-2
- Champions (Vol. 4) #1, 8
- Cherry #1-2
- Children of the Atom #1
- The Cimmerian: The Frost-Giant's Daughter #1
- The Clock #1
- Commanders in Crisis #1
- Conan the Barbarian (Vol. 3) #25
- Crossover #1
- The Crow: Lethe #1-3
- Danny Ketch: Ghost Rider #2
- Daredevil (Vol. 6) #25, 32
- Daredevil (Vol. 7) #1, 6-7
- Daredevil (Vol. 8) #4, 14 (NYCC 2024 Variant), 19
- Daredevil: Cold Day in Hell #3 (Marvel Rivals Variant)
- Dark Ages #5
- Dark Nights: Death Metal – Speed Metal #1
- Dark Web #1
- Dark Web: Finale #1
- DCeased: Dead Planet #1
- Deadly Neighborhood Spider-Man #1
- Deadpool (Vol. 8) #2, 7
- Deadpool (Vol. 9) #7
- The Death of Doctor Strange #1
- The Death of Doctor Strange: White Fox #1
- Deep Beyond #1
- Defenders (Vol. 6) #1
- The Department of Truth #1
- Detective Comics (Vol. 3) #1027
- Devil's Reign #1
- Devil's Reign: Omega #1
- DIE #6 (Cover B)
- Die!Namite #1-2
- DIE: Loaded #1
- Disaster Inc. #1
- Doctor Strange (Vol. 5) #20
- Doctor Strange (Vol. 6) #10
- Doctor Strange: Fall Sunrise #1
- Doctor Tomorrow #3
- Doctor Who #1-2
- Don't Pay The Ferryman #1
- Doom's Division #1-3
- Edge of Spider-Verse (Vol. 1) #2
- Edge of Spider-Verse (Vol. 3) #1
- Edge of Spider-Verse (Vol. 4) #3
- Eternals (Vol. 5) #1, 7
- Eule's Vision #1-3
- Excalibur (Vol. 4) #25
- Exceptional X-Men #7
- Extreme Venomverse #1-5
- Fallen Angels #2
- Fantastic Four (Vol. 6) #32-33
- Fantastic Four (Vol. 7) #2, 14, 28 (Marvel Rivals Variant), 30
- Fantastic Four / Gargoyles #1
- Fishflies #1 (Cover B)
- Fortnite x Marvel: Zero War #3
- Franklin and Ghost: Origins #1
- Future State: Immortal Wonder Woman #1 (Cover B)
- G.O.D.S. #1
- Gambit (Vol. 6) #1
- Generation X-23 #2
- Genis-Vell: Captain Marvel #1
- Ghost Rider (Vol. 9) #1-4, 9
- Ghost Rider: Return of Vengeance #1
- Ghost-Spider #2, 8
- Giant-Size Gwen Stacy #1
- Godzilla vs. Fantastic Four #1
- Gone #1 (Cover F)
- Groot (Vol. 2) #1
- Grrl Scouts: Stone Ghost #1
- Guardians of the Galaxy (Vol. 6) #13, 16
- Guardians of the Galaxy (Vol. 7) #2, 6
- Headless #1
- Hellcat (Vol. 2) #1
- Hellions #18
- Hello Darkness #1 (Cover C and SDCC 2024 Variants)
- Heroes Reborn (Vol. 2) #3
- Horizon: Zero Dawn #1-4
- Hulk (Vol. 5) #1, 13
- Hulkling & Wiccan #1
- I Hate Fairyland (Vol. 2) #1-5 (Cover D), 6-8, 10 (Cover F)
- The Immortal Hulk #48
- The Immortal Thor #1, 5, 24 (Marvel Rivals Variant)
- Immortal X-Men #1, 3, 5, 9
- Imperial #1
- The Incredible Hulk (Vol. 7) #7, 23
- Inferno (Vol. 2) #1-4
- The Invincible Iron Man (Vol. 5) #2
- Iron Cat #1
- Iron Man (Vol. 6) #4
- Iron Man / Hellcat Annual #1
- Jackpot and Black Cat #2
- Jane Foster & The Mighty Thor #1-5
- Jean Grey (Vol. 2) #2
- Jeff the Land Shark #2 (SDCC 2025 Variant)
- Jim Henson's Storyteller: Tricksters #1-4
- Ka-Zar: Lord of the Savage Land #1
- Kang the Conqueror #1
- Kaya #26 (Cover B)
- Kid Venom #2
- King in Black #1, 3
- King in Black: Gwenom vs. Carnage #3
- King in Black: Return of the Valkyries #1
- King in Black: Wiccan and Hulkling #1
- The Last Witch #1
- Laura Kinney: Wolverine #1, 4
- Locke & Key / The Sandman Universe: Hell & Gone #1
- Locke & Key: In Pale Battalions Go #1
- Luke Cage: Gang War #2
- Maestro: World War M #4
- Magik #1-5
- Marauders #1, 8-10
- Marvel & Disney: What If...? Donald Duck Became Wolverine
- Marvel & Disney: What If...? Minnie Became Captain Marvel
- Marvel & Disney: What If…? Donald Duck Became Thor
- Marvel / DC: Deadpool / Batman
- Marvel / DC: Spider-Man / Superman
- Marvel All-On-One
- Marvel Rising #1
- Marvel Rivals #1
- Marvel's Voices: Identity #1
- Mary Jane & Black Cat #1
- Mary Jane & Black Cat: Beyond
- Masterpiece #1 (Cover C)
- Meals to Astonish #1
- Mega Man: Fully Charged #1
- Mighty Morphin #2, 4, 6, 8
- The Mighty Valkyries #2
- Miles Morales and Moon Girl #1
- Miracleman #0
- Miracleman by Gaiman & Buckingham: The Silver Age #1
- Mirka Andolfo's Mercy #1
- Mirka Andolfo's Un/Sacred #3
- Mirka Andolfo's Sweet Paprika #1
- Miskatonic #1
- Monica Rambeau: Photon #1-2
- Moon Girl and Devil Dinosaur #1
- Moon Knight (Vol. 8) #2, 18, 30
- Moon Knight: Fist of Khonshu #2, 6
- Ms. Marvel & Moon Knight
- Ms. Marvel & Venom
- Ms. Marvel & Wolverine
- Ms. Marvel: Beyond the Limit #1
- Ms. Marvel: Mutant Menace #1-4
- Ms. Marvel: The New Mutant #3
- Namor the Sub-Mariner: Conquered Shores #3
- New Champions #1, 3
- New Mutants (Vol. 4) #13, 24
- Non-Stop Spider-Man #4
- NYX (Vol. 2) #1, 9
- Phoenix #1, 9, 11
- Predator #1
- Predator vs. Wolverine #1
- Psylocke (Vol. 2) #5
- Punchline #1
- Punisher (Vol. 14) #1
- Queen in Black #1
- Reckoning War: Trial of the Watcher #1
- Red Sonja: Age of Chaos #2
- Resident Evil: Infinite Darkness - The Beginning #1
- Rogue & Gambit (Vol. 2) #2
- Rorschach (Cover B) #2
- Runaways (Vol. 6) #1
- Sabretooth (Vol. 4) #5
- Sabrina the Teenage Witch: Something Wicked #1
- Scarlet Witch (Vol. 3) #6, Annual #1
- Scarlet Witch (Vol. 4) #2, 7, 10
- Scarlet Witch & Quicksilver #1
- The Sentry (Vol. 4) #1
- Shang-Chi (Vol. 2) #2-3
- She-Hulk (Vol. 5) #9
- Silk (Vol. 3) #1
- Silk (Vol. 5) #1
- Silver Surfer Rebirth #1
- Silver Surfer Rebirth: Legacy #4
- Silver Surfer: Black #4
- Sinister War #1
- Space Usagi #1
- Space Usagi: White Star Rising #1-2 (Cover B)
- Space Usagi: Yokai Hunter #1
- Spawn #357
- Spider-Boy #6
- Spider-Girl (Vol. 3) #1
- Spider-Gwen: Gwenverse #1-5 (Peach Momoko Design Variant)
- Spider-Gwen: Shadow Clones #1-5 (Peach Momoko Design Variant)
- Spider-Gwen: Smash #1-2
- Spider-Gwen: The Ghost-Spider #1
- Spider-Man (Vol. 4) #11
- Spider-Man & Venom: Double Trouble #2
- Spider-Man: Meals to Astonish #1
- Spider-Woman (Vol. 7) #1, 5, 7, 20
- Spider-Woman (Vol. 8) #2, 7
- Spine-Tingling Spider-Man #0
- Spirits of Violence #1
- Star Wars (Vol. 3) #32
- Star Wars Adventures (Vol. 1) #32 (Cover C)
- Star Wars Adventures (Vol. 2) #1
- Star Wars Adventures: The Clone Wars – Battle Tales #1, 3
- Star Wars Insider #200
- Star Wars: Bounty Hunters #32
- Star Wars: Darth Vader (Vol. 3) #32
- Star Wars: Doctor Aphra (Vol. 2) #30
- Star Wars: Han Solo & Chewbacca #10
- Star Wars: Hidden Empire #4
- Star Wars: Obi-Wan #1
- Star Wars: Return of the Jedi – Ewoks
- Star Wars: Return of the Jedi – Jabba's Palace
- Star Wars: Sana Starros #2
- Star Wars: The High Republic (Vol. 1) #6, 11
- Star Wars: The High Republic (Vol. 2) #1, 6
- Star Wars: The High Republic – The Blade #4
- Star Wars: The Mandalorian #4
- Star Wars: The Mandalorian Season 2 #1, 5
- Star Wars: Yoda #5
- Storm (Vol. 5) #6
- Strange (Vol. 3) #3
- Symbiote Spider-Man: Crossroads #4
- Teen Titans (Vol. 6) #46 (Cover B)
- Teenage Mutant Ninja Turtles (Vol. 1) #100, 110
- Teenage Mutant Ninja Turtles (Vol. 2) #1
- Teenage Mutant Ninja Turtles: The Last Ronin #1
- Thor (Vol. 6) #6, 16, 31
- Thunderbolts (Vol. 6) #1
- Timeless (Vol. 1) #1
- Timeless (Vol. 3) #1
