= GeGeGe no Kitarō =

Japanese manga series by Shigeru Mizuki and its adaptations

- First tankōbon volume cover (1985 edition) featuring the titular character, Kitarō (center-left), and some yōkai

ゲゲゲの鬼太郎
- Genre: Comedy horror; Dark fantasy; Supernatural
- Manga
- Written by: Shigeru Mizuki
- Published by: Kodansha
- English publisher: JP: Kodansha Bilingual Comic; NA: Drawn & Quarterly
- Imprint: Shōnen Magazine Comics
- Magazine: Weekly Shōnen Magazine
- Original run: 1960 – 1969
- Volumes: 9
Further information
Anime television series
1st series
Written by	Masaki Tsuji
Music by	Taku Izumi
Studio	Toei Animation
Original network	Fuji TV
Original run	January 3, 1968 – March 30, 1969
Episodes	65
Anime television series
2nd series
Written by	Masaki Tsuji
Music by	Taku Izumi
Studio	Toei Animation
Original network	FNS (Fuji TV)
Original run	October 7, 1971 – September 28, 1972
Episodes	45
Anime television series
3rd series
Directed by	Osamu Kasai (1–108); Hiroki Shibata (109–115)
Written by	Junki Takegami
Music by	Masahiro Kawasaki
Studio	Toei Animation
Original network	FNS (Fuji TV)
English network	NA: Nippon Golden Network
Original run	October 12, 1985 – March 21, 1988
Episodes	115
Anime television series
4th series
Directed by	Daisuke Nishio
Written by	Shun'ichi Yukimuro
Music by	Kaoru Wada
Studio	Toei Animation
Original network	FNS (Fuji TV)
English network	SEA: Animax Asia
Original run	January 7, 1996 – March 29, 1998
Episodes	114
Anime television series
5th series
Directed by	Yukio Kaizawa
Written by	Keiichi Hasegawa (1–26); Riku Sanjo (27–100)
Music by	Katsumi Horii
Studio	Toei Animation
Original network	FNS (Fuji TV)
English network	SEA: Animax Asia
Original run	April 1, 2007 – March 29, 2009
Episodes	100
Anime television series
Hakaba Kitarō
Directed by	Kimitoshi Chioki
Written by	Yoshimi Narita
Music by	Kaoru Wada
Studio	Toei Animation
Licensed by	AUS: Siren Visual
Original network	Fuji TV (Noitamina)
Original run	January 10, 2008 – March 20, 2008
Episodes	11
Live-action film
Kitaro
Directed by	Katsuhide Motoki
Produced by	Chihiro Kameyama
Written by	Katsuhide Motoki; Daisuke Habara
Music by	Yūta Nakano
Studio	Shochiku
Released	April 28, 2007
Runtime	105 minutes
Live-action film
Kitaro and the Millennium Curse
Directed by	Katsuhide Motoki
Written by	Mitsuhiko Sawamura
Studio	Shochiku
Released	July 12, 2008
Runtime	115 minutes
Anime film
GeGeGe no Kitarō: Explosive Japan!!
Directed by	Gō Koga
Written by	Riku Sanjo
Music by	Seiji Yokoyama
Studio	Toei Animation
Released	December 13, 2008
Runtime	85 minutes
Anime television series
6th series
Directed by	Kōji Ogawa
Written by	Hiroshi Ōnogi
Music by	-yaiba-; Yasuharu Takanashi
Studio	Toei Animation
Licensed by	Crunchyroll
Original network	FNS (Fuji TV)
English network	SEA: Animax Asia
Original run	April 1, 2018 – March 29, 2020
Episodes	97
Anime film
Birth of Kitarō: The Mystery of GeGeGe (2023)
- icon

GeGeGe no Kitarō (ゲゲゲの鬼太郎), originally known as Hakaba Kitarō (墓場鬼太郎, "Kitarō of the Graveyard"), is a Japanese manga series created in 1960 by Shigeru Mizuki. It is best known for its popularization of the folklore creatures known as yōkai, a class of spirit-monster which all of the main characters belong to. This story was an early 20th-century Japanese folk tale performed on kamishibai. It has been adapted for the screen several times, as anime, live action, and video games. The word GeGeGe (ゲゲゲ) in the title is similar to Japanese sound symbolism for a cackling noise but refers to Mizuki's childhood nickname, a mispronunciation of his given name.

Selections of the manga and the theatrical live-action films have been published in English, simply titled Kitaro. The 2018 anime series is streamed with English subtitles as GeGeGe no Kitaro. The publisher of the North American English manga is Drawn & Quarterly.

== Plot ==
GeGeGe no Kitarō focuses on the young Kitarō—the last survivor of the Ghost Tribe—and his adventures with other ghouls and strange creatures of Japanese mythology. Along with: the remains of his father, Medama-Oyaji (a mummified Ghost tribesman reincarnated to inhabit his old eyeball); Nezumi-Otoko (the rat-man); Neko-Musume (the cat-girl) and a host of other folkloric creatures, Kitarō strives to unite the worlds of humans and Yōkai.

Many storylines involve Kitarō facing off with myriad monsters from other countries, such as the Chinese vampire Yasha, the Transylvanian Dracula IV, and other such non-Japanese creations. In addition to this, Kitarō also locks horns with various malevolent yōkai who threaten the balance between the Japanese creatures and humans.

Some storylines make overt reference to traditional Japanese tales, most notably the folk tale of Momotarō, in which the young hero defends a Japanese territory from demons with the help of the native animals. The Kitarō series "The Great Yōkai War" (妖怪大戦争, Yōkai Daisensō) draws a great deal of influence from this story, with Kitarō and his yōkai friends driving a group of Western ghouls away from an island.

While the character of Kitarō in GeGeGe no Kitarō is a friendly boy who genuinely wants the best outcome for humans and yōkai alike, his earlier incarnation in Hakaba Kitarō portrays him as a much more darkly mischievous character. His apparent lack of empathy for humans combined with his general greed and desire for material wealth drives him to act in an unbecoming manner towards the human characters—often deceptively leading them into nightmarish situations or even to hell itself.

== Characters ==
Kitarō and his yōkai friends

Kitarō (鬼太郎)
Voiced by: Masako Nozawa (1968–1971 series, Hakaba Kitarō), Keiko Toda (1985 series), Yōko Matsuoka (1996 series), Minami Takayama (2007 series), Eiji Wentz (2008 film), Miyuki Sawashiro (2018 series), Rica Matsumoto (2003 video games)
Kitarō is a yōkai boy born in a cemetery and, aside from his mostly decayed father, the last living member of the Ghost Tribe (幽霊族, Yūreizoku). His name, rendered with the character for oni (鬼) (a kind of ogre-like yōkai) can be translated as "Demon Boy"—a name which references his yōkai heritage. He is missing his left eye, but his hair usually covers the empty socket. He fights for peace between humans and yōkai, which generally involves protecting the former from the wiles of the latter. When questioned in the 2007 movie, Kitarō responds that he is three hundred and fifty years old. In the 1985 series, he is half-human on his mother's side. As a member of the Ghost Tribe, Kitarō has an assortment of powers and weapons.
While his powers are featured prominently in the GeGeGe no Kitarō series, Hakaba Kitarō plays down Kitarō's supernatural abilities. Beyond having the power to travel through hell unharmed with the help of his Chanchanko, as well as the ability to regenerate from almost any injury (as evidenced when his body is recoverable after being dissolved by Johnny in the Fog), his powers are more of deception than of fighting prowess: something much more in line with traditional yōkai characters.
Medama-oyaji (目玉のおやじ, or 目玉親父; literally "Eyeball Father")
Voiced by: Isamu Tanonaka (1968, 1971, 1985, 1996, 2007 series, Hakaba Kitaro), Masako Nozawa (2018 series), Kazuo Kumakura (2003 video games)
Medama-oyaji is Kitarō's father. Once a fully-formed adult Ghost Tribe member, he perished from a disease, only to be reborn out of his decayed body as an anthropomorphic version of his own eyeball. He looks small and fragile, but has a strong spirit and a great love for his son. He is also extremely knowledgeable about ghosts and monsters. He enjoys staying clean, and is often seen bathing in a small bowl. He has a great love for sake.
In the 2002 Kodansha International Bilingual Comics edition and in Crunchyroll's subtitled version of the 2018 anime, he is referred to as "Daddy Eyeball".
Nezumi Otoko (ねずみ男; "Rat Man")
Voiced by: Chikao Ohtsuka (1968–1971 series, Hakaba Kitaro), Kei Tomiyama (1985 series), Shigeru Chiba (1996 series), Wataru Takagi (2007 series), Toshio Furukawa (2018 series), Nachi Nozawa (2003 video games)
Nezumi Otoko is a rodent-like yōkai–human half-breed. He has been alive for three hundred and sixty years, and in that time has almost never taken a bath, rendering him filthy, foul-smelling, and covered in welts and sores. While he is usually Kitarō's friend, Nezumi Otoko will waste no time cooking up vile schemes or betraying his companions if he thinks there's money to be had or a powerful enemy to side with. He claims to be a college graduate of the University of the Bizarre (怪奇大学, Kaiki Daigaku). He can immobilize even the strongest yōkai that accost him with a pungent flatulence attack. And, akin to cats and mice, he and Neko Musume cannot stand being around each other.
Nezumi Otoko first appears in the story "The Lodging House" (rental manga version) as Dracula IV's minion.
In the 2002 Kodansha International Bilingual Comics edition and in Crunchyroll's subtitled version of the 2018 anime, he is referred to as "Ratman".
Neko Musume (猫娘 or ねこ娘; "Cat Girl")
Voiced by: Nana Yamaguchi (1968 series), Yōko Ogushi (1971 series), Yūko Mita (1985 series), Chinami Nishimura (1996 series), Hiromi Konno (2007 series), Umeka Shōji (2018 series), Yūko Miyamura (2003 video games)
A normally quiet half-human yōkai girl, who shapeshifts into a frightening catlike monster with fangs and feline eyes when she is angry or hungry for rats and fish. Predictably, she does not get along well with Nezumi-Otoko. She seems to harbor a slight crush on Kitarō, who sees her only as a friend. In recent iterations (possibly due to the recent anime phenomenon of fanservice), she is very fond of human fashion and is seen in different outfits and uniforms. She bears some resemblance to the bakeneko of Japanese folklore.
Neko Musume first appears in the story "Neko-Musume and Nezumi-Otoko" (Weekly Shōnen Magazine version); however, another cat-girl named simply "Neko (猫)" appears in the earlier stories "The Vampire Tree and the Neko-Musume" and "A Walk to Hell" (rental version).
In the 2002 Kodansha International Bilingual Comics edition and in Crunchyroll's subtitled version of the 2018 anime, she is referred to as "Catchick".
Sunakake Babaa (砂かけ婆, "Sand-throwing hag")
Voiced by: Yōko Ogushi (1968 series), Keiko Yamamoto (1971 series, 1996–2007 series), Hiroko Emori (1985 series), Mayumi Tanaka (2018 series), Junko Hori (2003 video games) (Japanese)
Sunakake Babaa is an old human-like yōkai woman who carries sand which she throws into the eyes of enemies to blind them. She serves as an advisor to Kitarō and his companions, and manages a yōkai apartment building. The original sunakake-baba is an invisible sand-throwing spirit from the folklore of Nara Prefecture.
Sunakake babaa first appears in a cameo as one of many yōkai attending a sukiyaki party in the story "A Walk to Hell" (rental version) before making a more prominent appearance in "The Great Yōkai War" (Shōnen Magazine version).
In the 2002 Kodansha International Bilingual Comics edition and in Crunchyroll's subtitled version of the 2018 anime, she is referred to as the "Sand Witch".
Konaki-jiji (子泣き爺; "Child-crying Old Man")
Voiced by: Ichirō Nagai (1968 series, 1985 series), Kōji Yada (1971 series), Kōzō Shioya (1996 series), Naoki Tatsuta (2007 series), Bin Shimada (2018 series), Takanobu Hozumi (2003 video games) (Japanese)
Konaki Jijii is a comic, absent-minded old human-likeyōkai man who attacks enemies by clinging to them and turning himself to stone, increasing his weight and mass immensely and pinning them down. He and Sunakake Babaa often work as a team. The original konaki jijii is a ghost which is said to appear in the woods of Tokushima Prefecture in the form of a crying infant. When it is picked up by some hapless traveller, it increases its weight until it crushes him.
Konaki Jijii first appears in a cameo as one of many yōkai attending a sukiyaki party in the story "A Walk to Hell" (rental version) before making a more prominent appearance in "The Great Yōkai War" (Shōnen Magazine version).
In the 2002 Kodansha International Bilingual Comics edition and in Crunchyroll's subtitled version of the 2018 anime, he is referred to as "Old Man Crybaby".
Ittan Momen (一反木綿; "Roll of Cotton")
Voiced by: Kōsei Tomita (1968 series), Keaton Yamada (1971 series), Jōji Yanami (1985 series, 2007 series), Naoki Tatsuta (1996 series), Kappei Yamaguchi (2018 series), Kenichi Ogata (2003 video games)
Ittan Momen is a flying yōkai resembling a strip of white cloth. Kitarō and friends often ride on him when traveling. The original ittan-momen is a spirit from Kagoshima Prefecture myth which wraps itself around the faces of humans in an attempt to smother them.
Ittan Momen first appears in the story "The Great Yōkai War" (Shōnen Magazine version).
In the 2002 Kodansha International Bilingual Comics edition and in Crunchyroll's subtitled version of the 2018 anime, he is referred to as "Rollo Cloth".
Nurikabe (ぬりかべ; "Plastered Wall")
Voiced by: Yonehiko Kitagawa, Kenji Utsumi (1968 series), Kōsei Tomita (1968 series, 2003 video games), Keaton Yamada (1971 series), Yusaku Yara (1985 series), Naoki Tatsuta (1996–2007 series), Bin Shimada (2018 series)
Nurikabe is a large, sleepy-eyed, wall-shaped yōkai, who uses his massive size to protect Kitarō and his friends. The original nurikabe is a spirit which blocks the passage of people walking at night.
Nurikabe first appears in a cameo as one of many yōkai attending a sukiyaki party in the story "A Walk to Hell" (rental version) before making a more prominent appearance in "The Great Yōkai War" (Shōnen Magazine version).
In the 2002 Kodansha International Bilingual Comics edition and in Crunchyroll's subtitled version of the 2018 anime, he is referred to as "Wally Wall".
Nurarihyon (ぬらりひょん)
Voiced by: Ryūji Saikachi (1968 series), Takeshi Aono (1985 series, 2007 series), Tomomichi Nishimura (1996 series), Akio Ōtsuka (2018 anime), Junpei Takiguchi (2003 video games)
Kitarō's old rival, he is depicted as an old man who comes at other people's houses and drinks their tea. He is also a member of the Gazu Hyakki Yagyō, and Nurarihyon has a member he always uses named Shu no Bon.
Back Beard (バックベアード, Bakku Beādo)
Voiced by: Kōsei Tomita (1968 series), Hidekatsu Shibata (1985 series, 2007 series), Masaharu Satō (1996 series), Hideyuki Tanaka (2018 series), Kiyoshi Kobayashi (2003 video games)
Back Beard is the boss of the Western yōkai and Kitarō's second greatest foe after Nurarihyon. He is loosely based on the bugbear. He is a giant, round shadow with a single large eye in the center and several tentacles extending from his body. He appeared most prominently in the story "The Great Yōkai War", where he rallied all the Western yōkai into a war against the Japanese yōkai. He used his hypnotic powers to make Nezumi Otoko betray Kitarō and later hypnotized Kitarō himself. He has since appeared semi-regularly throughout the franchise.

== Analysis ==
The character Kitarō can be seen as an extension of artist Shigeru Mizuki himself. "Gegege," a childhood nickname derived from Mizuki's own mispronunciation of "Shigeru", ties the creator and creation together. Mizuki's own loss of a left arm in World War II mirrors Kitarō's hidden eye, while Medama-oyaji might be read as the embodiment of a guiding force, perhaps even a symbolic stand-in for Mizuki's missing limb.

Kitarō's world is populated by both original yōkai created by Mizuki, such as Nezumi-otoko (Rat-Man), and adapted figures from earlier folklore. Mizuki's work frequently drew on sources like Kunio Yanagita's Yōkai Meii and Toriyama Sekien's illustrated catalogs, rendering visible many beings that had only existed as vague textual descriptions. For instance, Yanagita describes the "Sunakake-babaa" (sand-throwing old woman) as an unseen yōkai found in Nara Prefecture. Mizuki transforms her into a vivid character. Similarly, the yōkai "Nurikabe", an invisible wall that obstructs nighttime travelers, is given form as a blocky creature with eyes and legs.

== Media ==
An illustration from the original Hakaba no Kitarō kamishibai, printed in Kōji Kada's Kamishibai Shōwashi (紙芝居昭和史, "Kamishibai Showa History"). This picture depicts the Kitarō character as significantly more frightening and threatening than Mizuki's version of the character.

=== Kamishibai ===
The front cover of the 2013 translated compilation published by Drawn & Quarterly.

The Kitarō story began life as a kamishibai in 1933, written by Masami Itō (伊藤正美) and illustrated by Keiyō Tatsumi (辰巳恵洋). Itō's version was called Hakaba Kitarō (墓場奇太郎(ハカバキタロー), "Kitarō of the Graveyard"); the title is generally written in katakana to distinguish it from Mizuki's version of the tale.

According to Itō, her Kitarō was based on local legends describing the same or similar stories. It is also said to be a loose reinterpretation of the similar Japanese folktale called the 子育て幽霊 Kosodate Yūrei or "The Candy-Buying Ghost" (飴買い幽霊, Amekai Yūrei), which were inspired by Chinese folklore from 12th to 13th centuries.

In 1954, Mizuki was asked to continue the series by his publisher, Katsumaru Suzuki.

=== Manga ===
Kitarō of the Graveyard was published as a rental manga in 1960, but it was considered too scary for children. In 1965, renamed to Hakaba no Kitarō, it appeared in Shōnen Magazine (after one of the editors came across the kashibon and offered Mizuki a contract) and ran through 1970. The series was renamed GeGeGe no Kitarō in 1967 and continued in Weekly Shōnen Sunday, Shōnen Action, Shukan Jitsuwa and many other magazines.

In 2002, GeGeGe no Kitarō was translated by Ralph F. McCarthy and compiled by Natsuhiko Kyogoku for Kodansha Bilingual Comics. Three bilingual (Japanese–English) volumes were released in 2002.

Since 2013, compilation volumes of selected manga chapters from the 1960s have been published by Drawn & Quarterly, with English translations by Zack Davisson and an introduction by Matt Alt in the first compilation volume. Drawn & Quarterly later published a large collection of Kitaro manga under the title Kitaro, with Jocelyne Allen as the translator. Zack Davisson wrote the volume's afterword.

=== Anime ===
Seven anime adaptations were made from Mizuki's manga series. They were broadcast on Fuji Television and animated by Toei Animation.

The opening theme to all six series is "GeGeGe no Kitarō", written by Mizuki himself. It has been sung by Kazuo Kumakura (1st, 2nd), Ikuzo Yoshi (3rd), Yūkadan (4th), Shigeru Izumiya (5th), the 50 Kaitenz (6th) and Kiyoshi Hikawa (7th). The song was also used in the live-action films starring Eiji Wentz. In the first film, it was performed by Wentz' WaT partner Teppei Koike.

In January 2008, a series based on Hakaba Kitaro (墓場奇太郎, Hakaba Kitarō), (also produced by Toei) premiered on Fuji TV during the late night hours in the Noitamina block. and unlike the usual anime versions, it is closer to Mizuki's manga and is not part of the existing remake canon. It also features a completely different opening theme song ("Mononoke Dance" by Denki Groove) and ending theme song ("Snow Tears" by Shoko Nakagawa).

A seventh series, announced in early 2018, directed by Kōji Ogawa and written by Hiroshi Ohnogi started airing on Fuji TV on April 1, 2018, to celebrate the anime's 50th anniversary. The series concluded on March 29, 2020, as it entered its final arc, the "Nurarihyon Arc", on October 6, 2019. It streamed on Crunchyroll, making it the first Kitarō anime to be available in North America.

An English dub aired as Spooky Kitaro on Animax Asia. Hakaba Kitaro was released with English subtitles on DVD in Australia and New Zealand.

A rebroadcast program of all six of the franchise's television series, titled GeGeGe no Kitarō: My Favorite GeGeGe Generation (ゲゲゲの鬼太郎 私の愛した歴代ゲゲゲ, GeGeGe no Kitarō Watashi no Ai Shita Rekidai GeGeGe), aired on Fuji TV and other channels from April 6 to September 21, 2025. The theme song for the program is a rendition of "GeGeGe no Kitaro" by Ado while the ending theme for the first half is "Party of Monsters" by Kiyoshi Hikawa featuring Tetsuya Komuro. For the second half, the ending theme is titled "Yami ni Goyōshin", performed by Keisuke Yamauchi.

==== GeGeGe no Kitarō series ====
No.	Run	Episodes	Series direction
1	January 3, 1968 – March 30, 1969	65	
2	October 7, 1971 – September 28, 1972	45	
3	October 12, 1985 – March 21, 1988	115	Osamu Kasai, Hiroki Shibata
4	January 7, 1996 – March 29, 1998	114	Daisuke Nishio
5	April 1, 2007 – March 29, 2009	100	Yukio Kaizawa
6	April 1, 2018 – March 29, 2020	97	Kōji Ogawa
Total	1968–2020	536	-

==== Hakaba Kitarō ====
No.	Run	Episodes	Series direction
1	January 10 – March 20, 2008	11	Kimitoshi Chioki

==== Films ====
1968 series

- GeGeGe no Kitarō (July 21, 1968) (edited version of episodes 5 and 6)

1971 series

- GeGeGe no Kitarō: The Divining Eye (July 12, 1980) (edited version of episode 37)

1985 series

All films in the 1985 series are produced by Kenji Yokoyama.

Film	Japan release date	Directed by	Written by	Animation directed by
GeGeGe no Kitarō: The Yokai Army	December 21, 1985	Takeshi Shirato	Hiroyuki Hoshiyama	Yasuhiro Yamaguchi
GeGeGe no Kitarō: The Great Yokai War	March 15, 1986	Osamu Kasai	Hiroyuki Hoshiyama	Yoshinori Kanemori
GeGeGe no Kitarō: The Strongest Yokai Army! Disembark for Japan!	July 12, 1986	Yugo Serikawa	Hiroyuki Hoshiyama	Yasuhiro Yamaguchi
GeGeGe no Kitarō: Clash! The Great Rebellion of the Dimensional Yokai	December 20, 1986	Hiroki Shibata	Junki Takegami	Satoru Iriyoshi & Hiromi Niioka

1996 series

All films in the 1996 series are produced by Tan Takaiwa and Tsutomu Tomari.

Film	Japan release date	Directed by	Written by	Animation directed by
GeGeGe no Kitarō: The Great Sea Beast	July 6, 1996	Tomoharu Katsumata	Hiroyuki Hoshiyama	Michi Himeno & Shingo Araki
GeGeGe no Kitarō: Obake Nighter	March 8, 1997	Junichi Sato	Michiru Shimada	Hidemi Kubo
GeGeGe no Kitarō: Yokai Express! The Phantom Train	July 12, 1997	Takao Yoshizawa	Yukiyoshi Ohashi	Michi Himeno & Shingo Araki

2007 series

- GeGeGe no Kitarō: Japan Explodes!! (December 20, 2008)

2018 series

- Birth of Kitarō: The Mystery of GeGeGe (2023)

Other

- Yo-kai Watch Shadowside: Oni-ō no Fukkatsu (December 16, 2017) – crossover film with the Yo-kai Watch series

=== Live-action films ===
Two live-action films have been released. The first one, Kitaro (released in Japan as GeGeGe no Kitarō (ゲゲゲの鬼太郎)), was released on April 28, 2007. It stars Eiji Wentz as Kitarō and Yo Oizumi as Nezumi Otoko. The film follows Kitarō as he tries to save a young high school girl, Mika Miura, while also trying to stop the powerful "spectre stone" from falling into the wrong hands. The live-action film makes extensive use of practical costumes and CG characters to depict the cast of yōkai.

The second film, Kitaro and the Millennium Curse (ゲゲゲの鬼太郎 千年呪い唄, GeGeGe no Kitarō Sennen Noroi Uta), was released on July 12, 2008. Wentz reprised his role as Kitarō. It follows Kitarō and his friends as they try to solve a 1000-year-old curse that threatens the life of his human companion Kaede Hiramoto.

=== Video games ===
- Gegege no Kitarō: Yōkai Daimakyō (ゲゲゲの鬼太郎 妖怪大魔境) for the Famicom (April 17, 1986; Bandai)
- Gegege no Kitarō 2: Yōkai Gundan no Chōsen (ゲゲゲの鬼太郎2 妖怪軍団の挑戦) for the Famicom (December 22, 1987; Bandai)
- Gegege no Kitarō: Fukkatsu! Tenma Daiō (ゲゲゲの鬼太郎 復活! 天魔大王) for the Super Famicom (February 5, 1993; Bandai)
- Gegege no Kitarō: Yōkai Donjara (ゲゲゲの鬼太郎 妖怪ドンジャラ) for the Super Famicom (July 19, 1996; Bandai) (requires Sufami Turbo)
- Gegege no Kitarō: Yōkai Sōzōshu Arawaru (ゲゲゲの鬼太郎 妖怪創造主現る!) for the Game Boy (December 13, 1996; Bandai)
- Gegege no Kitarō: Gentōkai Kitan (ゲゲゲの鬼太郎 幻冬怪奇譚) for the Sega Saturn (December 27, 1996; Bandai)
- Gegege no Kitarō (ゲゲゲの鬼太郎) for the PlayStation (January 24, 1997; Bandai)
- Hissatsu Pachinko Station Now 5: Gegege no Kitarō (必殺パチンコステーションnow5 ゲゲゲの鬼太郎) for the PlayStation (July 19, 2000; Sunsoft)
- Yōkai Hana Asobi (妖怪花あそび) for Microsoft Windows (August 9, 2001; Unbalance)
- Gegege no Kitarō: Gyakushū! Yōkai Daichisen (ゲゲゲの鬼太郎 逆襲! 妖魔大血戦) for the PlayStation (December 11, 2003; Konami)
- Gegege no Kitarō: Ibun Yōkaitan (ゲゲゲの鬼太郎 異聞妖怪奇譚) for the PlayStation 2 (December 11, 2003; Konami)
- Gegege no Kitarō: Kiki Ippatsu! Yōkai Rettō (ゲゲゲの鬼太郎 危機一発! 妖怪列島) for the Game Boy Advance (December 11, 2003; Konami)
- Gegege no Kitarō: Yōkai Daiundōkai (ゲゲゲの鬼太郎 妖怪大運動会) for the Wii (November 22, 2007; Namco Bandai Games)
- Gegege no Kitarō: Yōkai Daigekisen (ゲゲゲの鬼太郎 妖怪大激戦) for the Nintendo DS (July 10, 2008; Namco Bandai Games)

== See also ==
- Yokai Monsters: Shigeru Mizuki and his friends (most notably Hiroshi Aramata and Natsuhiko Kyogoku) have participated in productions, resulting in minor crossovers between GeGeGe no Kitarō and Teito Monogatari, and Daiei Film (Kadokawa Corporation) characters including Gamera and Daimajin and Sadako Yamamura. Characters from these franchises also serve as mascots of Chōfu, with occasional joint exhibitions.
