= Moemi Katayama =

Japanese model (born 1990)

- 片山 萌美
- Born: 1 October 1990 (age 35); Tokyo, Japan
- Occupations: Gravure idol; actress; television personality
- Years active: 2012—present
- Modeling information
- Height: 170 cm (5 ft 7 in) (2018)

Moemi Katayama (片山 萌美, Katayama Moemi; born 1 October 1990) is a Japanese model, actress, and tarento from Tokyo who has modelled for a number of magazines and commercials as well as acting in theatre, film, television and radio. Affiliated with Wintarts, she graduated from Reitaku University's Faculty of Economics.

== Works ==
=== DVD ===
- Watashi-meguri (22 Apr 2016, Takeshobo)*Simultaneously released on Blu-ray Disc
- Sonna Vacance (2 Mar 2018, Happinet)*Simultaneously released on Blu-ray Disc

=== Photo albums ===
- Ningyo (14 Sep 2016, Shueisha)
- Rashin Moemi Katayama (5 Jan 2017, Kodansha) Shooting—Andy Chao

=== Photo exhibitions ===
- 2017 Nude Collabo Energy (2—9 Jan 2017, Shibuya Hikarie) Shooting—Andy Chao

== Appearances ==
=== Magazines ===
- Weekly Playboy (Shueisha, Sep, Dec 2014, Feb 2015, Jun (*cover), Sep (*cover), Oct, Dec 2016 (*cover), Jan, Jun 2017)
- Weekly Young Jump (2015 No. 11, released Feb — published online, Shueisha) — Genseki 10!!
- Cyzo (Cyzo, No. Aug 2015 (released 18 Jul)*cover, No. Jan 2017 (released 19 Dec 2016))
- Big Comic Spirits (Shogakukan, Feb 2016)*cover
- Shūkan Gendai (Kodansha, Apr, Jul, Aug, Oct, Dec 2016)
- Weekly Playboy Extra Published Gravure Special (Shueisha, No. 10 Jun 2016 (released 28 Apr))
- Circus Max (KK Bestsellers, No. Jun 2016 (released 10 May), No. Apr 2017 (released 10 Mar))*cover
- Men's Joker (KK Bestsellers, No. Jul 2016 (released 10 Jun))
- Weekly Asahi Geinō (Tokuma Shoten, No. 21 Jul 2016 (published 12 Jul))*in Terry Ito's interview
- Shūkan Bunshun (Bungeishunjū, No. 25 Aug 2016 (published 17 Aug))*"Genshoku Bijo Zukan"
- Ima, Ichiban sugoi Gravure Bijo-tachi (KK Bestsellers, Circus Max Special Issue Sep 2016 (released 29 Aug))
- Golf Jōhō Magazine: Waggle (Jitsugyo no Nihon Sha, No. Nov 2016 (released 21 Sep))
- Friday (Kodansha, No. 14 Oct, (released 30 Sep), No. 16 Dec 2016 (released 2 Dec)*cover, No. 10 Feb 2017 (released 27 Jan))
- Bike Jōhō-shi: GooBike Shutoken-ban (Proto Corporation, No. 7 Nov 2016 (released 7 Oct))*cover
- Flash (Kobunsha, Oct 2016)
- Young Champion (Akita Shoten, 2016 No.21 (released 11 Oct))*cover
- Weekly ASCII (Kadokawa, No.1097 (released 11 Oct 2016))*electronic ver. cover
- Shūkan Taishū (Futabasha, No. 28 Nov 2016 (released 14 Nov))*cover and "Zubari Honne de Bijo Talk"
- Mamor (Fusosha, No. Jan 2017 (released 22 Nov 2016)*cover, No. Jan 2018 (released 21 Nov 2017)*Special Calendar 2018)
- Young Gangan (Square Enix, No. Aug 2017 (released 7 Apr))&cover and top gravure
- Shūkan Spa! (Fusosha, No. 1 Aug 2017 (released 25 Jul))*cover)
- Softdarts Bible (San-ei Shobo, released 27 Jul 2017, 26 May 2018*cover)
- The Television (Kadokawa, released 2 Aug 2017)
- Shukan Jitsuwa (Nihon Journal Publishing, No. 19 Apr 2018 (released 5 Apr))*cover

=== Stage ===
- Gekidan Sora-kan Engine Produce Tokyo Zoom II (30 Jun — 4 Jul 2011, Air Studio)
- Gekidan Sora-kan Engine Produce 7-Chōme 16-Banchi: Yume-ya ~3-Kai mawatte One no Maki~ (2—7 Nov 2011, Theatre Rapport)
- Harapeko Penguin! 19th Performance Asahi Ikka no Chōsen-jō (31 Jan — 3 Feb 2013, Kichijoji Theater)
- Tokyo Theatrical Club Produce Performance Vol.6 Summer's Rain (Kari): Datte Sukidakara! (25—30 Jun 2014, Hiroyuki Toono Hiroshi Memorial Theatre) — as Joanna
- Tokyo Theatrical Club Produce Performance Vol.7 Blackjack ni Yoroshiku ~Gankanja-hen~ (3—8 Sep 2014, Rikkōkai Hall) — as Noriko Kodama
- Sōzō Shūdan Seikatsu Kōjō Iinkai 32nd Performance Organs ~Onna Akahige Funtō-ki~ (20—24 May 2015, Ginza Hakuhinkan Theater) — as Aya Serizawa
- FPadvance produce Bank Bang Bang Lessonson (2—6 Sep 2015, Senbon Sakura Hall)
- Tsuki o Koete ~Over the Taboo~ (21—25 Dec 2015, Jinbōchō Kagetsu)
- Kanda Tokikita-gumihon Performance Dai Kaichōban!! Soshite Ryōma wa Korosareta ~Bakumatsu Mon dakedo Argentine Tango kara Kayōkyoku made nandemo Tsukatte moīyone~ (27 Apr — 1 May 2016, Haiyu-za Theater) — as Yae
- Yokohama Graffiti (26—31 Jul, Haiyu-za Theater/6—7 Aug 2016, Prefectural Citizen Mirai Hall) — as Julie [Juri Tachibana]
- "Straydog" Produce Performance Kanashiki Tenshi (10—13 Nov, Kichijoji Theater/26—27 Nov 2016, Hep Hall) — Starring; as Kazumi
- Romancing SaGa: The Stage ~Rohne ga Moeru Hi~ (15—23 Apr, Sunshine Theatre/28—30 Apr, Sankei Hall Breeze/3—4 May, Aichi Prefectural Art Theatre, large hall/6—7 May 2017, Kurume City Plaza The Grand Hall) — as Byūnei

=== TV dramas ===
- Seicho Matsumoto Special Project Kyōhan-sha (30 Sep 2015, TX)
- OL desuga, Kyaba-jō hajimemashita (Jun—Jul 2016, MBS—TBS) — as Mari
- Aibō season 15 Episode 6 "Gift" (22 Feb 2017, EX) — as Minami Arimura
- Taiga drama Naotora: The Lady Warlord (21 May 2017, NHK) — as Woman with feelings
- Hello Hari Nezumi (14 Jul — 15 Sep 2017, TBS) — as Moemi
- Nichiyō Wide Shūchakueki Series 31: Satsujin no Hana Kyaku (16 Jul 2017, EX)
- Nichiyō Wide Shihō Kyōkan Yoshiko Hotaka (1 Oct 2017, EX)
- Drama 24 Shinjuku Seven (13 Oct 2017, TX) — as Asuka
- Haken no Kyaba-jō–Ayaka (3 Dec 2017, ABC) — as Kasumi Kanuma
- Shin Series Seisaku Kinen! Asamade Tokumei Kakarichō Hitoshi Tadano Christmas Special (25 Dec 2017, EX) — as Arisa Makimura
- Izakaya bottakuri (Apr—Jun 2018, BS12) — Starring; as Mine
- Friday Night Drama Kaseifu no Mitazono (27 Apr 2018, EX) — as Rumi
- Taiga drama Idaten (2019, NHK) — as Chii-chan
- 13 Assassins (2020, NHK)

=== Other TV programmes ===
- Koisuru Coming Out (2014, CX)
- Harajuku Book Cafe (2014, BS Fuji)
- Bakumon! Saikyō Dokkiri-sai (2014, TBS)
- All-Star Thanksgiving '14 Spring (2014, TBS) assistant
- Cutting Edge: IT Saizensen (2016, BS-TBS)
- Kono Aki dōshitemo Hairitai: Nippon no Hitō Best 10 (2016, TX)
- Shinya Kissa Sujiganeze (22, 29 Jan, 5 Feb 2017, CX)
- Nikenme dōsuru?: Tsumami no Hanashi (26 Aug 2017, TX)
- Moemi Katayama no Moemiru: Sonna Vacance (5 Jan 2018 —, BS Fuji)*First Kanmuri programme
- Jikkuri Kii Tarō: Star Kinkyō (Hi) Hōkoku (23 Feb 2018, TX)

=== Films ===
- Kyōkasho ni nai! (18 Jun 2016, Nippon Shuppan) — as Yayoi Gogatsu
- Kyōkasho ni nai! 2 (19 Jun 2016, Nippon Shuppan) — as Yayoi Gogatsu
- Scoop! (1 Oct 2016, Toho)
- Gekijō-ban: Shikabane Shūgoku (2017, Gekijō-ban: Shikabane Shūgoku Production Committee) — Starring; as Mikoto
  - Okoshino-hen (3 Jun)
  - Yuino-hen (10 Jun)
- Megamisama (10 Jun 2017, Media Mix Japan) — as Naomi Takasu
- Fumiko's Feet (10 Feb 2018, TBS Service) — Starring; as Fumiko Ashida
- Shoplifters (8 Jun 2018, Gaga) — as Nozomi Hojo
- Lenses on Her Heart (after Summer 2018) — as Masae Akino
- The Gun (2018)
- Tezuka's Barbara (2019)
- Go Away, Ultramarine (2019)
- We Couldn't Become Adults (2021)
- 1446: An Eternal Minute (2022)
- S-Friends (2023)
- S-Friends 2 (2023)
- Matched (2024)
- City Hunter (2024)
- S-Friends 3 (2025)
- S-Friends 4 (2025)

=== Radio ===
- Pakkun Tamago (21 Oct 2012 — 11 Apr 2013, MBS Radio)
- Shigoto to Jinsei o Omoshiroku suru~Shuta Ujike no Next View (Jan 2015 —, bayfm) regular

=== Advertisements ===
- The Fukui Bank (2014)
- 6waves "Smartphone Application Mikuni Tenmu: Honkaku Senryaku Battle" (2016)

=== Music videos ===
- SiM "A" (2017)
- SiM "The Sound Of Breath" (2017)

=== Internet ===
- Juken Sapuri (Mar 2015 —, Recruit)
- SportsNaviDo Moemi Katayama no Honolulu Half Chōsen-ki (Mar 2015 —, Yahoo! Japan)
- The North Wind and The Sun: The Movie [Kirin no Dogoshi <Nama>] (May 2016 —, Kirin)

=== Internet programmes ===
- Shinsō Kaimei! Chōsa Hōdō Variety: Katte ni Deguchi Chōsa (8, 15 Jan 2017 —, AbemaTV)
- Chigau de Show! (26 Feb 2017 —, AbemaTV)
- Ogiyahagi no "Busu" TV (4 Dec 2017 —, AbemaTV)

=== Internet dramas ===
- Tokumei Kakarichō Tadano Hitoshi: AbemaTV Original (4 Feb 2017, AbemaTV) — as Arisa Makimura
- Spin-off Drama Otona Kōkō: Episode 0 (8 Oct 2017, au Video Pass—AbemaTV) — as Miwa Komaki
- Haken no Kyaba-jō–Ayaka (27 Nov 2017, AbemaTV) — as Kasumi Kanuma
