= Birth of Kitarō: The Mystery of GeGeGe =

2023 film by Gō Koga

- Theatrical release poster
- Kanji: 鬼太郎誕生 ゲゲゲの謎
- Revised Hepburn: Kitarō Tanjō: GeGeGe no Nazo
- Directed by: Gō Koga
- Screenplay by: Hiroyuki Yoshino
- Based on: GeGeGe no Kitarō by Shigeru Mizuki
- Produced by: Keisuke Naito
- Starring: Toshihiko Seki; Hidenobu Kiuchi; Atsumi Tanezaki; Yumiko Kobayashi; Toshio Furukawa; Miyuki Sawashiro; Umeka Shōji; Masako Nozawa
- Cinematography: Tomoyuki Ishiyama
- Music by: Kenji Kawai
- Production company: Toei Animation
- Distributed by: Toei Company, Ltd.
- Release date: November 17, 2023
- Running time: 104 minutes
- Country: Japan
- Language: Japanese

Birth of Kitarō: The Mystery of GeGeGe (Japanese: 鬼太郎誕生 ゲゲゲの謎, Hepburn: Kitarō Tanjō: GeGeGe no Nazo) is a 2023 Japanese animated dark fantasy film, directed by Gō Koga and written by Hiroyuki Yoshino; the film is based on the GeGeGe no Kitarō manga series by Shigeru Mizuki. Produced by Toei Animation and distributed by Toei Company, Birth of Kitarō commemorates Mizuki's 100th birthday and is the fourth film in the franchise. It is a prequel to the 2018 anime series, which tells the story of Kitarō's birth, focusing on a salaryman named Mizuki (based on Shigeru Mizuki himself) and Kitarō's father. However, unlike the main series, it was made as a horror story aimed at adults.

The film stars the voices of Toshihiko Seki, Hidenobu Kiuchi, Atsumi Tanezaki, Yumiko Kobayashi, and Toshio Furukawa, with Miyuki Sawashiro, Umeka Shōji, and Masako Nozawa reprising their roles from the 2018 anime series. Birth of Kitarō was released in Japan on November 17, 2023, and an uncut version, titled True Birth Edition, (Note: 鬼太郎誕生 ゲゲゲの謎 真生版, Kitarō Tanjō: GeGeGe no Nazo Shinseiban; lit. "Birth of Kitarō: The Mystery of GeGeGe - True Birth Edition") on October 4, 2024.

== Synopsis ==
Set in the 1950s, a salaryman and war veteran named Mizuki visits a village that is the source of a mysterious medicine "M". He encounters a strange white haired man, the superstitious family that runs the village, and then a series of bizarre deaths.

== Voice cast ==
Character	Japanese voice cast
Kitarō's father / Gegerō / Medama-Oyaji	Toshihiko Seki (human form); Masako Nozawa (yōkai form)
Mizuki	Hidenobu Kiuchi
Kitarō	Miyuki Sawashiro
Neko Musume	Umeka Shōji
Nezumi Otoko	Toshio Furukawa
Sayo Ryūga	Atsumi Tanezaki
Tokiya	Yumiko Kobayashi
Tokisada Ryūga	Tetsu Shiratori
Tokima	Nobuo Tobita
Otome	Yoko Soumi
Hinoe	Yuko Minaguchi
Yamada	Masaya Matsukaze
Kenji Nagata	Akira Ishida
Kanako Nagata	Rie Kugimiya
Katsunori	Kazuhiro Yamaji
Kōzō	Kazuya Nakai

== Production ==
In March 2021, it was announced that Gegege no Kitaro manga series was to receive an anime film adaptation, and in November of that year, it was announced that Gō Koga was directing the film at Toei Animation, with Hiroyuki Yoshino providing the screenplay, Tōko Yatabe designing the characters, and music composed by Kenji Kawai. In September 2023, it was announced that Toshihiko Seki was cast as Kitarō's father and Hidenobu Kiuchi as Mizuki, with Atsumi Tanezaki, Yumiko Kobayashi, and Toshio Furukawa joining the ensemble cast, while Miyuki Sawashiro, Umeka Shōji, and Masako Nozawa were reprising their respective roles as Kitarō, Neko Musume and Medama-oyaji from the 2018 anime series.

== Release ==
The film was released in theaters in Japan on November 17, 2023, and an uncut version, subtitled True Birth Edition on October 4, 2024, which featured re-edited contents and new dialogues. It was also released via Neofilms in theaters in Hong Kong on March 7, 2024, and is set to release in Malaysia and Indonesia.

== Reception ==
=== Box office ===
The film opened at number 2 out of top 10 in the Japanese box office in its opening weekend, and dropped to number 4 in its second week, but rose to number 3 a week after.

The True Birth Edition debuted at number 3 in the box office in its opening weekend, and later dropped to number 5 in its second week.

=== Accolades ===
Birth of Kitarō: The Mystery of GeGeGe was nominated at the 47th Japan Academy Film Prize for "Best Animation Film" category. The film won the Animage's Anime Grand Prix poll, with Mizuki and Kitarō's father taking first and second best character awards.
