= The Homeless Student =

2007 novel by Hiroshi Tamura

- The Homeless Student novel written by Hiroshi Tamura as published Wani Books.

ホームレス中学生 (Hōmuresu Chūgakusei)
- Genre: Autobiography, Homelessness, Child abandonment
- Novel
- Written by: Hiroshi Tamura
- Published by: Wani Books
- Published: August 31, 2007
- Manga
- Written by: Hiroshi Tamura
- Illustrated by: Santa Uonome
- Published by: Yoshimoto Books
- Original run: January 17, 2008 – April 24, 2008
- Volumes: 2
- Live-action television film
- Directed by: Hideki Takeuchi
- Produced by: Sansao Reiko
- Written by: Yuichi Tokunaga
- Studio: Fuji TV
- Released: July 12, 2008
- Live-action film
- Directed by: Tomoyuki Furumaya
- Produced by: Homeless Middle School Student Production Committee, SEDIC International
- Written by: Tomoyuki Furumaya, Noriko Goto
- Music by: Tadashi Ueda
- Studio: Toho
- Released: October 25, 2008
- Runtime: 116 minutes
- Novel

Homeless University Student
- Written by: Kenichi Tamura
- Published by: Wani Books
- Published: October 25, 2008
- Live-action television film

Homeless as a Junior High School Student
- Directed by: Hideo Jōjō
- Produced by: Miyabiro Toshima
- Written by: Izumi Yoshihiro
- Studio: Ace Dunce Entertainment
- Released: October 25, 2008
- Live-action television film

Homeless Student 2
- Directed by: Shin Hirano
- Produced by: Sansao Reiko
- Written by: Yuichi Tokunaga
- Studio: Fuji TV
- Released: April 12, 2009

The Homeless Student (Japanese: ホームレス中学生, Hepburn: Hōmuresu Chūgakusei; literally: "Homeless Middle School Student") is a Japanese autobiographical novel by Hiroshi Tamura. The novel was published by Wani Books on August 31, 2007, and is licensed in China by Shanghai Translation Publishing House and in Korea by Cine21.

The novel was adapted into a two-volume manga by Yoshimoto Books, an elementary student's novel, two television specials by Fuji TV, another novel by Hiroshi's brother and a parody film by Hideo Jōjō. The novel was ranked first in the first half of 2008 on the Oricon charts. Teppei Koike was awarded the Newcomer of the Year award in 2008 at the 32nd Japan Academy Prize.

== Development ==
Tamura credits the success of his novel to his "admittedly poor literary skills", for as a 28-year-old he was able to write like an eighth grader. The novel's simple language, excessive use of exclamations, bold type and cartoon drawings are reminiscent of an adolescent's diary in the days before blogs. Japanese professor and translator Alisa Freedman claims that the success of Diary of a Wimpy Kid was due to writing in a similar style to Homeless.

Freedman comments on Homeless 's use of cross-media marketing pioneered by Crying Out Love, In the Center of the World. She notes that "all versions of Homeless Junior High School Student use Osaka dialect, and almost every artist and actor involved was from Osaka." The children's book was marketed through the use of the obi strip as being "full of affection for parents", framing the "importance of home and family" in homeless narratives.

== Releases ==
=== Novel ===
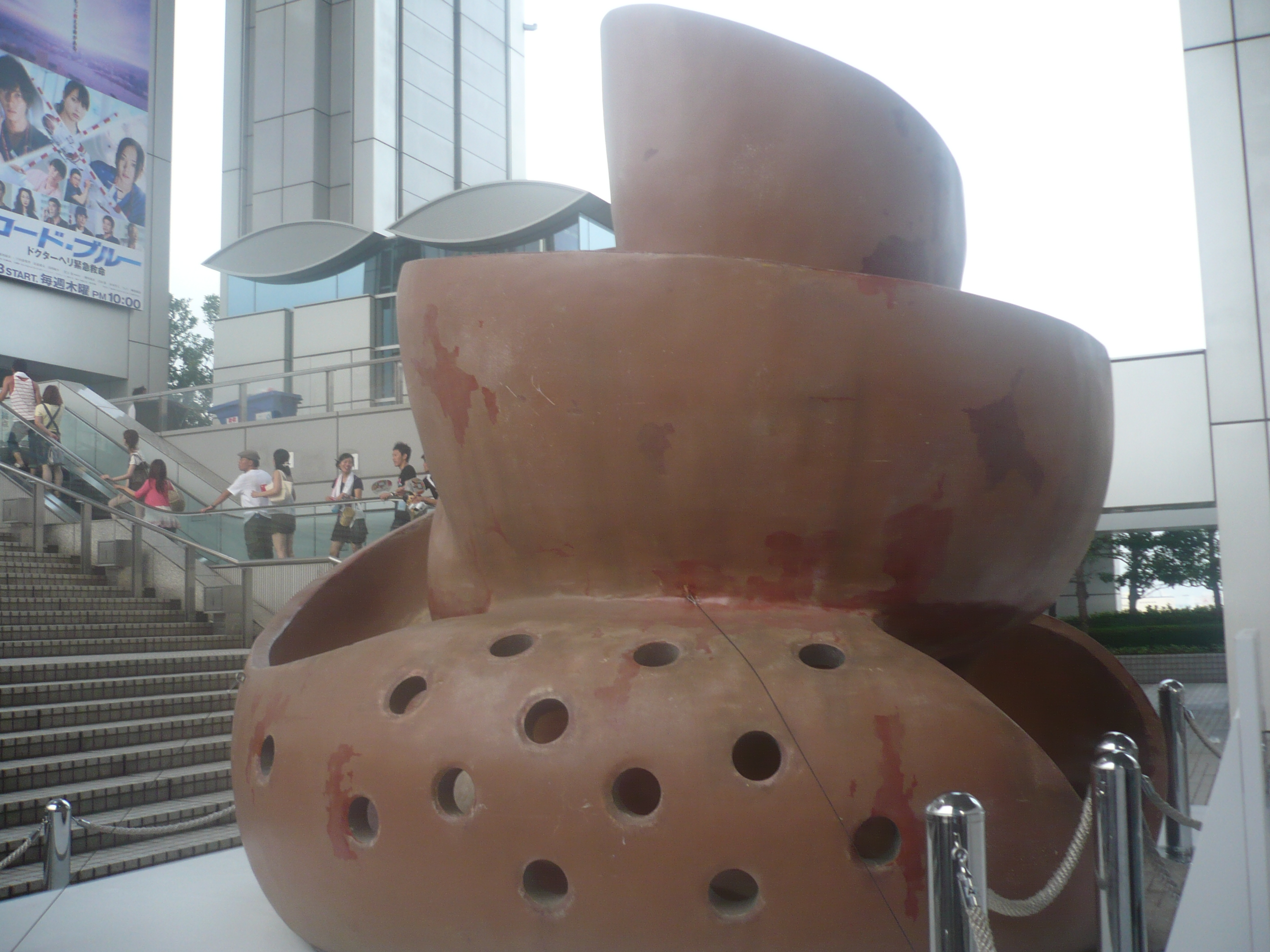
Slide at Second West Yamada Park

The Homeless Student is a novel written by Hiroshi Tamura On Hitoshi Matsumoto's reality television show True Funny Stories Brought to You by Hitoshi Matsumoto (人志松本のすべらない話, Hitoshi Matsumoto no suberanai hanashi) in 2006, Tamura recounted his experience of being homeless for a few weeks of the age of thirteen, where he went to a nearby park. The novel was published by Wani Books on August 31, 2007. The novel is licensed in China by Shanghai Translation Publishing House and in Korea by Cine21.

=== Manga ===
The novel was adapted into a two volume manga by Yoshimoto Books, with Hiroshi Tamura as writer and Santa Uonome as illustrator, which released the books on January 17, 2008, and April 17, 2008.

=== Children's book ===
On July 24, 2008, Wani Books published an abridged version of the novel for elementary students, illustrated by Yūji Yamamoto, using large-print and hiragana instead of kanji.

=== Television dramas ===
On July 12, 2008, a special television drama produced by and was aired on Fuji TV. Hideki Takeuchi directed the special, with Yuichi Tokunaga as screenwriter and Sansao Reiko as producer. Tatsuya Kuroki was cast as Hiroshi Tamura, with Kaho as Yukie Tamura, Kei Tanaka as Kenichi Tamura, Takashi Naitō as Michinori Tamura and Hiroko Yakushimaru as Keiko Tamura.

A second television drama was produced by Fuji TV as The Homeless Student 2, which was broadcast as a special on April 12, 2009. Shin Hirano directed the second special, with Yuichi Tokunaga as screenwriter and Sansao Reiko as producer. The cast of the first special reprised their roles in the second special. The ending theme for both the television specials are "Here" by The Grace.

=== Film ===
It was adapted into a Japanese film directed by Tomoyuki Furumaya in 2008. The film was produced by Toho and premiered on October 25, 2008. Tomoyuki Furumaya and Noriko Goto wrote the screenplay for the film. The film cast Teppei Koike as Hiroshi Tamura, Akihiro Nishino as Kenichi Tamura, Chizuru Ikewaki as Sachiko Tamura and Yuko Kotegawa as Kyoko Tamura. The ending theme of the film is "Here" by The Grace. Yoshimoto R&C released the normal and special DVDs of the film on April 24, 2009.

=== Homeless University Student novel ===
On October 25, 2008, Kenichi Tamura, Hiroshi's brother, released a book with his own version of the novel, titled Homeless University Student (ホームレス大学生, Hōmuresu daigakusei). It was published by Wani Books.

=== Parody film ===
On the same date, a parody film Homeless as Junior High School Student (ホームレスが中学生, Hōmuresu ga chūgakusei) directed and written by Hideo Jōjō was released, with the main character as a middle-aged homeless man forced to return to finish his compulsory education. The film was produced by Jolly Roger Co. Ltd. Hachirō Utsunomiya plays the lead role as Masaru Suzaki. In the film, Suzaki only has one spoken line, whilst most of portrayal of Suzaki's view is shown through a documentary film made by three cinema club members of the school. Utsunomiya also sang the parody film's ending song "What Now, Japan?" (Dō naru no, Nippon?). Miyabiro Toshima was the producer, whilst Izumi Yoshihiro wrote the screenplay. The parody film's DVD was released Ace Dunce Entertainment on April 24, 2009.

== Reception ==
The Homeless Student novel sold over 1 million copies in a month and became the second best-selling book of 2007. By the premiere of the film on October 25, 2008, the book had sold 2.2 million copies. The novel was ranked first in the first half of 2008 on the Oricon charts.

The Homeless Student film premiered on the box office in fourth place, with $1.2 million over 90,246 admissions on 309 screens. Teppei Koike was awarded the Newcomer of the Year award in 2008 at the 32nd Japan Academy Prize. The Japan Times' Mark Schilling compares the film to Nobody Knows, citing the similarities between the two movies. However, he criticizes the casting of Teppei Koike as he "is nearly a decade older than his character and looks it, no matter how wide he opens those baby-fawn eyes." Midnight Eye's Miguel Douglas further criticizes the film for showing that "Hiroshi doesn't have the slightest chance of dying from hunger or lack of shelter". He continues his criticism of the "highly unrealistic" with "complete strangers" that "show an incredible amount of decency and hospitality towards [Hiroshi]".
