= GeGeGe no Kitarō (2018 TV series) =

Japanese anime television series

- Promotional poster featuring Kitaro, Medama-Oyaji, Nezumi-Otoko, Neko-Musume, Sunakake-Babaa, Konaki-Jijii, Iitan Momen, Nurikabe and Mana Inuyama
- Genre: Comedy horror Supernatural
- Based on: GeGeGe no Kitarō by Shigeru Mizuki
- Written by: Hiroshi Ōnogi
- Directed by: Koji Ogawa
- Voices of: Miyuki Sawashiro; Masako Nozawa; Toshio Furukawa; Umeka Shōji; Yukiyo Fujii; Bin Shimada; Mayumi Tanaka; Kappei Yamaguchi
- Music by: Yasuharu Takanashi; Yaiba
- Country of origin: Japan
- Original language: Japanese
- No. of episodes: 97

Production
- Producers: Yuta Kano (Fuji TV); Naoko Sagawa (Yomiko); Daichi Nagatomi (Toei Animation); Satoru Takami (Toei Animation)
- Production companies: Fuji Television; Yomiko Advertising; Toei Animation

Original release
- Network: FNS (Fuji TV)
- Release: April 1, 2018 – March 29, 2020

Related
- 2007 anime; 1996 anime; 1985 anime; 1971 anime; 1968 anime

The sixth GeGeGe no Kitarō anime adaptation. It premiered on April 1, 2018. This anime adaptation celebrates the 50th anniversary of the original 1968 anime. Produced by Toei Animation, it aired on Fuji Television from April 1, 2018, to March 29, 2020. Crunchyroll streamed the series with original Japanese audio and English subtitles.

== Episodes ==
No.	Title (Note: All English episode titles taken from Crunchyroll.)	Original release date
1	"The Day Yokai Awoke"; Transliteration: "Yōkai ga Mezameta Hi" (Japanese: 妖怪が目覚めた日)	April 1, 2018
ft. 吸血木 vampire tree and のびあがり stretcher/tiptoe stander
2	"Terrifying! Miage-Nyūdō"; Transliteration: "Senritsu! Miage-Nyūdō" (Japanese: 戦慄!見上げ入道)	April 8, 2018
ft. 見上げ入道 look-up bald monkster
3	"Tantanbo's Yokai Castle"; Transliteration: "Tantanbō no Yōkai-Jō" (Japanese: たんたん坊の妖怪城)	April 15, 2018
ft. たんたん坊 flowy boy 鎌鼬 weasel whirlwind 二口女 two-mouthed woman
4	"The Taboo of the Mysterious Forest"; Transliteration: "Fushigi no Mori no Kinki" (Japanese: 不思議の森の禁忌)	April 22, 2018
ft.
5	"The Disaster of the Electric Yokai"; Transliteration: "Denkiyōkai no Saiyaku" (Japanese: 電気妖怪の災厄)	April 29, 2018
ft. 雷の妖怪 thunderbolt apparition
6	"The Misfortune of the Sunekosuri"; Transliteration: "Yaku'un no Sunekosuri" (Japanese: 厄運のすねこすり)	May 6, 2018
ft. すねこすり shin rubber
7	"Ghost Train"; Transliteration: "Yūrei Densha" (Japanese: 幽霊電車)	May 13, 2018
8	"Menace! Kagami Jijii's plot" Transliteration: "Kyōi! Kagami-Jijī no Keiryaku" (Japanese: 驚異！鏡じじいの計略)	May 20, 2018
ft. 鏡爺 mirror geezer がしゃどくろ cracking skull
9	"The Kappa's Work Reform"; Transliteration: "Kappa no Hataraki-Kata Kaikaku" (Japanese: 河童の働き方改革)	May 27, 2018
ft. 河童 riverlings
10	"Vanishing! The Seven School Mysteries"; Transliteration: "Shōmetsu! Gakkō no Nana-Fushigi" (Japanese: 消滅！学校の七不思議)	June 3, 2018
ft. トイレのはなこさん Ms. Hanako of the toilet
11	"Conquer Japan! The 808 Tanuki Army"; Transliteration: "Nihon Seifuku! Happiakuya Tanuki Gundan" (Japanese: 日本征服！八百八狸軍団)	June 10, 2018
ft. 刑部狸 penal affairs tanuki
12	"Capital Annihilated! The Terrifying Yokai Beast"; Transliteration: "Shuto Kaimetsu! Kyōfu no Yōkai-Jū" (Japanese: 首都壊滅！恐怖の妖怪獣)	June 17, 2018
13	"Diamonds Of Greed! Wanyudo's Trap"; Transliteration: "Yokubō no Kongōseki! Wanyuudō no Wana" (Japanese: 欲望の金剛石！輪入道の罠)	June 24, 2018
ft. 輪入道 wheel monkster
14	"Makura-Gaeshi And The Fantastic Dream"; Transliteration: "Makura Gaeshi to Maboroshi no Yume" (Japanese: まくら返しと幻の夢)	July 1, 2018
ft. 枕返し pillow flip
15	"Zunbera Spiritplasty"; Transliteration: "Zunbera Reikei Shujutsu" (Japanese: ずんべら霊形手術)	July 8, 2018
ft. ずんべら坊/野箆坊 featureless one
16	"The Mystery Of The Tide! Umizato"; Transliteration: "Ushio no Kai! Umizatō" (Japanese: 潮の怪！海座頭)	July 15, 2018
ft. 海座頭 ocean blind
17	"Kani-Bozu And The Ancient Mystery"; Transliteration: "Kani-Bōzu to Inishie no Nazo" (Japanese: 蟹坊主と古の謎)	July 22, 2018
18	"Kawauso's Lie"; Transliteration: "Kawauso no Uso" (Japanese: かわうそのウソ)	July 29, 2018
ft. 川獺 river otter
19	"Yokai Resurrection?! The Ghost School"; Transliteration: "Fukkatsu Yōkai!? Obake no Gakkō" (Japanese: 復活妖怪!?おばけの学校)	August 5, 2018
ft. 見上げ入道, たんたん坊, 鎌鼬, 二口女
20	"Memories Of The Yoka"; Transliteration: "Yōka no Kioku" (Japanese: 妖花の記憶)	August 12, 2018
21	"Flame on! The Solitude of the Takuro-Bi"; Transliteration: "Enjō! Takurō-Bi no Kodoku" (Japanese: 炎上！たくろう火の孤独)	August 19, 2018
22	"Berserk!! The Terrifying Yokai, Gyuki"; Transliteration: "Bōsō!! Saikyō Yōkai Gyūki" (Japanese: 暴走!! 最恐妖怪牛鬼)	August 26, 2018
23	"The Yokai Apartment Secret Story"; Transliteration: "Yōkai Apāto Hiwa" (Japanese: 妖怪アパート秘話)	September 2, 2018
24	"Rat Man's Disappearance?! Sekiyo's Trap"; Transliteration: "Nezumi-Otoko Shissō!? Sekiyō no Wana" (Japanese: ねずみ男失踪!? 石妖の罠)	September 16, 2018
25	"Kubire-Oni's Curse"; Transliteration: "Kubire-Oni no Jūso" (Japanese: くびれ鬼の呪詛)	September 23, 2018
26	"Infatuation! The Alluring Gahi"; Transliteration: "Kowaku! Uruwashi no Gahi" (Japanese: 蠱惑！麗しの画皮)	September 30, 2018
27	"Invasion! The Backbeard Army"; Transliteration: "Shūrai! Bakkubeādo Gundan" (Japanese: 襲来！バックベアード軍団)	October 7, 2018
28	"The Great Yokai War"; Transliteration: "Yōkai Dai Sensō" (Japanese: 妖怪大戦争)	October 14, 2018
29	"The Mad Frankenstein"; Transliteration: "Kyōki no Furankenshutain" (Japanese: 狂気のフランケンシュタイン)	October 21, 2018
30	"The Vampire's Halloween Party"; Transliteration: "Kyūketsuki no Harowin Pātī" (Japanese: 吸血鬼のハロウィンパーティー)	October 28, 2018
31	"Azuki-Arai, Azuki-Hakari, Azuki-Babaa"; Transliteration: "Azuki-Arai, Azuki-Hakari, Azuki-Babā" (Japanese: 小豆洗い小豆はかり小豆婆)	November 4, 2018
32	"Demon Belial The Hundred-Year Grudge"; Transliteration: "Akuma Beriaru Hyakunen no Ensa" (Japanese: 悪魔ベリアル 百年の怨嗟)	November 11, 2018
33	"The Fox's Wedding And Hakusanbo"; Transliteration: "Kitsune no Yomeiri to Hakusanbō" (Japanese: 狐の嫁入りと白山坊)	November 18, 2018
34	"Emperor Backbeard"; Transliteration: "Teiō Bakkubeādo" (Japanese: 帝王バックベアード)	November 25, 2018
35	"The Witches Of Destiny"; Transliteration: "Unmei no Majo-Tachi" (Japanese: 運命の魔女たち)	December 9, 2018
36	"The Transform All Japanese Yokai Project"; Transliteration: "Nihon-Zen Yōkai-Ka Keikaku" (Japanese: 日本全妖怪化計画)	December 16, 2018
37	"Showdown!! Backbeard"; Transliteration: "Kessen!! Bakkubeādo" (Japanese: 決戦!! バックベアード)	December 23, 2018
38	"New Year's Man-Eating Fable Kasha"; Transliteration: "Shinshun Shokujin Kitan Kasha" (Japanese: 新春食人奇譚火車)	January 6, 2019
39	"Yuki-Onna Pure White Love Report"; Transliteration: "Yuki-Onna Junpaku Renai Hakusho" (Japanese: 雪女純白恋愛白書)	January 13, 2019
40	"The Final Ballad Sara-Kozo"; Transliteration: "Shūkyoku no Tanka Sara-Kozō" (Japanese: 終極の譚歌 さら小僧)	January 20, 2019
41	"Enigma! The Bake-Zori Rebellion"; Transliteration: "Kaiji! Bake-Zōri no Ran" (Japanese: 怪事！化け草履の乱)	January 27, 2019
42	"Momon-Jii's Scheme The Great Yokai Trial"; Transliteration: "Momon-Jī no Kankei Yōkai Dai Saiban" (Japanese: 百々爺の姦計 妖怪大裁判)	February 3, 2019
43	"Eternal Life Odoro-Odoro"; Transliteration: "Eien no Inochi Odoro-Odoro" (Japanese: 永遠の命 おどろおどろ)	February 10, 2019
44	"Masquerade Nopperabo"; Transliteration: "Narisumashi Nopperabō" (Japanese: なりすましのっぺらぼう)	February 17, 2019
45	"The Truth Lies In The Thicket Of The Mannen-Dake"; Transliteration: "Shinsō wa Mannen-Dake no Yabu no Naka" (Japanese: 真相は万年竹の藪の中)	February 24, 2019
46	"The Cursed Doll Festival Mayuge"; Transliteration: "Noroi no Hinamatsuri Mayuge" (Japanese: 呪いのひな祭り 麻桶毛)	March 3, 2019
47	"The Baby-Stealing Ubume"; Transliteration: "Akago Sarai no Ubume" (Japanese: 赤子さらいの姑獲鳥)	March 17, 2019
48	"The Void Of Despair And Darkness"; Transliteration: "Zetsubō to Shikkoku no Kyomu" (Japanese: 絶望と漆黒の虚無)	March 24, 2019
49	"Nanashi And Mana"; Transliteration: "Nanashi to Mana" (Japanese: 名無しと真名)	March 31, 2019
50	"Messenger From the Underworld Nue"; Transliteration: "Jigoku Kara no Shisha Nue" (Japanese: 地獄からの使者 鵺)	April 7, 2019
51	"Enma-Diao's Secret Bargain"; Transliteration: "Enma-Daiō no Mitsuyaku" (Japanese: 閻魔大王の密約)	April 14, 2019
52	"Runaway Girl! The Forest of the Kinoko"; Transliteration: "Shōjo Shissō! Kinoko no Mori" (Japanese: 少女失踪！木の子の森)	April 21, 2019
53	"Narcissism Overload! Nuke-Kubi's Close Call!"; Transliteration: "Jikoai Bōhatsu! Nuke-Kubi Kikiippatsu" (Japanese: 自己愛暴発！ぬけ首危機一髪)	April 28, 2019
54	"Dorotabo, life and Earth"; Transliteration: "Dorotabō to Inochi to Daichi" (Japanese: 泥田坊と命と大地)	May 5, 2019
55	"Hihi's Harassment Hell"; Transliteration: "Hihi no Harasumento Jigoku" (Japanese: 狒々のハラスメント地獄)	May 12, 2019
56	"The Bewitching Melody Elite the Vampire"; Transliteration: "Miwaku no Senritsu Kyūketsuki Erīto" (Japanese: 魅惑の旋律 吸血鬼エリート)	May 19, 2019
57	"The Bloody Noble La Siene"; Transliteration: "Senketsu no Kikōshi Ra Sēnu" (Japanese: 鮮血の貴公子ラ・セーヌ)	May 26, 2019
58	"The Han-Gyojin's Strange Kamaboko Tale"; Transliteration: "Han-Gyojin no Kamaboko Kidan" (Japanese: 半魚人のかまぼこ奇談)	June 2, 2019
59	"Promise to The Female Yokai Ushirogami"; Transliteration: "Onna Yōkai Ushirogami Tono Yakusoku" (Japanese: 女妖怪・後神との約束)	June 9, 2019
60	"Pitch-Black Coldness The Yokai Buru-Buru"; Transliteration: "Shikkoku no Reiki Yōkai Buru-Buru" (Japanese: 漆黒の冷気 妖怪ぶるぶる)	June 16, 2019
61	"Tofu-Kozo's Mold Pandemic"; Transliteration: "Tofu-Kozō no Kabi Pandemikku" (Japanese: 豆腐小僧のカビパンデミック)	June 23, 2019
62	"The Four Generals of the Underworld Kurobozu's Trap"; Transliteration: "Jigoku no Yonshō Kurobōzu no Wana" (Japanese: 地獄の四将 黒坊主の罠)	June 30, 2019
63	"The Star Festival of Love The Yokai Flower"; Transliteration: "Koi no Tanabata Yōkaika" (Japanese: 恋の七夕妖怪花)	July 7, 2019
64	"The Heart's Darkness the Suiko Reflects"; Transliteration: "Suiko ga Utsusu Kokoro no Yami" (Japanese: 水虎が映す心の闇)	July 14, 2019
65	"Nation Founding Mabyo's Great Tottori Empire"; Transliteration: "Kenkoku!? Mabyō no Dai Tottori Teikoku" (Japanese: 建国!? 魔猫の大鳥取帝国)	July 21, 2019
66	"The Shinigami and Sakaiminato's Hidden Village"; Transliteration: "Shinigami to Sakaiminato no Kakure-Zato" (Japanese: 死神と境港の隠れ里)	July 28, 2019
67	"The Social Media Addict Versus The Jomon Man"; Transliteration: "SNS Chūdoku VS Jōmonjin" (Japanese: SNS中毒VS縄文人)	August 4, 2019
68	"Capital Punishment! exiled to the Underworld"; Transliteration: "Kyokkei! Jigoku Nagashi" (Japanese: 極刑！地獄流し)	August 11, 2019
69	"General of the Underworld The Kido, Ibukimaru"; Transliteration: "Jigoku no Yonshō Kidō Ibukimaru" (Japanese: 地獄の四将 鬼童伊吹丸)	August 18, 2019
70	"Spirit Affiction Mysterious Footprints"; Transliteration: "Reishō Ashiato no Kai" (Japanese: 霊障 足跡の怪)	August 25, 2019
71	"Karakasa's Umbrella Troubles"; Transliteration: "Karakasa no Kasa Wazurai" (Japanese: 唐傘の傘わずらい)	September 1, 2019
72	"Iyami the Yokai's Great Love Project"; Transliteration: "Yōkai Iyami no Iroboke Dai Sakusen" (Japanese: 妖怪いやみの色ボケ大作戦)	September 8, 2019
73	"The Yamata-no-Orochi of Greed"; Transliteration: "Yokubō no Yamata no Orochi" (Japanese: 欲望のヤマタノオロチ)	September 15, 2019
74	"The Fall of the Underworld?! Tamamo-no-Mae's Trap"; Transliteration: "Jigoku Hōkai!? Tamamo no Mae no Wana" (Japanese: 地獄崩壊！？玉藻前の罠)	September 22, 2019
75	"Kyubi no Kistune"; Transliteration: "Kyūbi no Kitsune" (Japanese: 九尾の狐)	September 29, 2019
76	"Nurarihyon's Ambition"; Transliteration: "Nurarihyon no Yabō" (Japanese: ぬらりひょんの野望)	October 6, 2019
77	"Vanishing Humans! Neko-Sennin's Revenge"; Transliteration: "Ningen Shōshitsu! Neko-Sennin no Fukushū" (Japanese: 人間消失! 猫仙人の復讐)	October 13, 2019
78	"The Moryo of Mukuro Village"; Transliteration: "Mukuro-mura no Mōryō" (Japanese: 六黒村の魍魎)	October 20, 2019
79	"Komori-Neko's Halloween Pandemonium"; Transliteration: "Kōmori-Neko no Harouin Dai Bakuhatsu" (Japanese: こうもり貓のハロウィン大爆発)	October 27, 2019
80	"Onmoraki's Trap"; Transliteration: "Onmoraki no Wana" (Japanese: おんもらきの罠)	November 10, 2019
81	"Hot Blooded Manga Artist The Yōkai Hiderigami"; Transliteration: "Nekketsu Mangaka Yōkai Hiderigami" (Japanese: 熱血漫画家 妖怪ひでり神)	November 17, 2019
82	"Geriatric Nuppeppo"; Transliteration: "Jijibaba Nuppeppō" (Japanese: 爺婆ぬっぺっぽう)	November 24, 2019
83	"Chain of Hatred The Yokai Hoko"; Transliteration: "Zōo no Rensa Yōkai Hōkō" (Japanese: 憎悪の連鎖 妖怪ほうこう)	December 1, 2019
84	"Chin-san, The Foreign Worker"; Transliteration: "Gaikokujin Rōdōsha Chin-san" (Japanese: 外国人労働者チンさん)	December 8, 2019
85	"The Giant, Daidarabotchi"; Transliteration: "Kyojin Daidarabocchi" (Japanese: 巨人ダイダラボッチ)	December 15, 2019
86	"Bloody Christmas"; Transliteration: "Senketsu no Kurisumasu" (Japanese: 鮮血のクリスマス)	December 22, 2019
87	"The Binbogami and The Zashiki-Warashi"; Transliteration: "Binbōgami to Zashiki-Warashi" (Japanese: 貧乏神と座敷童子)	January 5, 2020
88	"Rollo Cloth's Romance"; Transliteration: "Ittan-Momen no Koi" (Japanese: 一反もめんの恋)	January 12, 2020
89	"The Curse of Te-no-Me"; Transliteration: "Te-no-Me no Noroi" (Japanese: 手の目の呪い)	January 19, 2020
90	"Idol Legend Sazae-Oni"; Transliteration: "Aidoru Densetsu Sazae-Oni" (Japanese: アイドル伝説さざえ鬼)	January 26, 2020
91	"The Misty Night of Angkor Wat"; Transliteration: "Ankōru Watto no Kiri no Yoru" (Japanese: アンコールワットの霧の夜)	February 2, 2020
92	"The Writer is Ama-no-Jaku"; Transliteration: "Kōsei Sakka wa Ama-no-Jaku" (Japanese: 構成作家は天邪鬼)	February 9, 2020
93	"The Phantom Train"; Transliteration: "Maboroshi no Kisha" (Japanese: まぼろしの汽車)	February 16, 2020
94	"The Lazy Fujimi Hot Springs Bus Trip"; Transliteration: "Burari Fujimi Onsen Basu no Tabi" (Japanese: ぶらり富士見温泉バスの旅)	February 23, 2020
95	"The Great Yokai Alliance"; Transliteration: "Yōkai Dai Dōmei" (Japanese: 妖怪大同盟)	March 15, 2020
96	"The Second Great Yokai War"; Transliteration: "Dainiji Yōkai Dai Sensō" (Japanese: 第二次妖怪大戦争)	March 22, 2020
97	"The World You See Isn't All There Is"; Transliteration: "Mieteru Sekai ga Subete Janai" (Japanese: 見えてる世界が全てじゃない)	March 29, 2020

== Home media ==
=== Region A (Japan) ===
Name	Date	Discs	Episodes	Reference
ゲゲゲの鬼太郎 (第6作) Blu-ray Box 1	October 2, 2018	2	1–12	
ゲゲゲの鬼太郎 (第6作) Blu-ray Box 2	January 9, 2019	2	13–26	
ゲゲゲの鬼太郎 (第6作) Blu-ray Box 3	April 4, 2019	2	27–37	
ゲゲゲの鬼太郎 (第6作) Blu-ray Box 4	July 2, 2019	2	38–49	
ゲゲゲの鬼太郎 (第6作) Blu-ray Box 5	October 2, 2019	2	50–62	
ゲゲゲの鬼太郎 (第6作) Blu-ray Box 6	January 8, 2020	2	63–75	
ゲゲゲの鬼太郎 (第6作) Blu-ray Box 7	April 2, 2020	2	76–86	
ゲゲゲの鬼太郎 (第6作) Blu-ray Box 8	July 2, 2020	2	87–97	
