= Eiji Wentz =

American-Japanese singer, entertainer, and actor

Eiji Wentz ウエンツ 瑛士
- Born: October 8, 1985 (age 40); Musashino, Tokyo, Japan
- Genres: Pop, rock
- Occupations: Singer-songwriter actor television personality
- Years active: 1989–present
- Label: Universal Music Japan
- Website: wentz.fanmo.jp/profile.php

Eiji Wentz (ウエンツ瑛士, Uentsu Eiji; Born October 8, 1985) is a Japanese singer, entertainer, actor, and a member of the singer-songwriter duo WaT.

== Early career ==
Born in Mitaka, Tokyo to a Japanese mother and a German American father, Wentz became involved in the entertainment industry at a very young age. Wentz initially started as a model at the age of four and made his acting debut as the role of Chip in the Four Seasons Musical Troupe production of Beauty and the Beast. He became famous as a child actor as a regular on the NHK television show, Tensai Terebi-kun (天才テレビくん), where he played bass guitar and piano at the age of ten. During live performances, he played the acoustic bass as well as the keyboard. He started learning the guitar from the age of 17. He is featured in the popular rock band Luna Sea's music video for their 1996 single "In Silence".

He originally wanted to be a fashion model, but was too short to become one. When he terminated his contract with Tensai Terebi-kun, he decided to get away from show-business, but after the recommendation of Hiromi Go, he entered Burning Productions and became a tarento.

He began his acting career at the age of 18, when he played a minor role in the NHK television series Toshiie To Matsu.

In 2007, he started to appear in several of Cocorico's comedy shows as Shorty Tanaka (ちっこい田中, Little Tanaka) and since Tensai Terebi Kun, he is a deshi (student) of Yoshimoto comedian Hōsei Tsukitei.

== Musical career ==
After Tensai Terebi-kun ended, Wentz continued to play music and started the band WaT with Teppei Koike. They started in 2002 with street performances. In February 2004, they released an indie-label CD. In August 2005, they signed with Universal Music Group and had their major debut in November 2005.

== Popularity ==
His popularity may be derived from his self-mocking "comedian" character, as he often talks about his "foolishness", short height, and difficulty in speaking English.

== Personal life ==
Wentz is a follower of the baseball team Saitama Seibu Lions. He was once invited to the Lions' victory ceremony in 2008, and has a large collection of baseball cards. He also has over 800 volumes of manga.

== Filmography ==
=== Television ===
==== TV Dramas ====
- Kyūmei Senshi Nano Seibaa (1997), a drama within the NHK show Tensai Terebi-kun
- Gokusen (2002) as Yuki Masato
- Toshiie and Matsu (2002) as Mori Ranmaru
- Wagaya no Rekishi (2010) as Maruyama Akihiro
- Japan Sinks: People of Hope (2021) as Taira Ishizuka

=== TV Variety and other programs ===
- Tuesday Surprise (2009-2018) MC

=== Film ===
- Gegege no Kitarō (2007) Kitarō
- Yudo: The Way of the Bath (2023)

=== Dubbing ===
- Arthur Christmas, Arthur Claus
- Jack the Giant Slayer, Jack
- Trolls World Tour, Branch
