= Fusosha Publishing =

Japanese publishing company

Fusosha Publishing Inc.
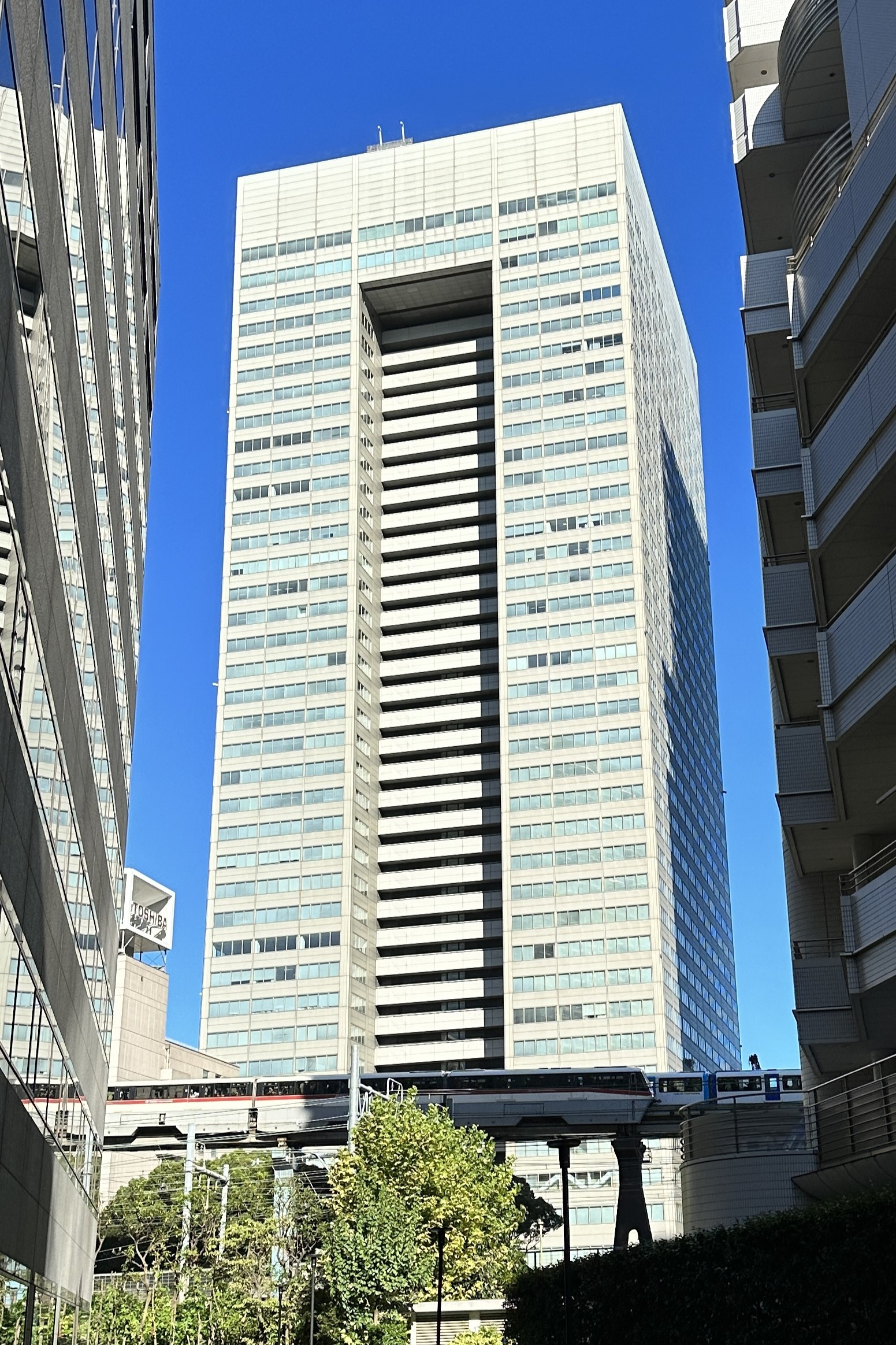
- Fusosha's headquarters at Hamamatsucho Building in Shibaura, Tokyo.
- Type: Kabushiki kaisha
- Industry: Media industry
- Founded: 1987
- Headquarters: Shibaura, Minato, Tokyo, Japan
- Products: Books, magazines
- Owner: Fuji Media Holdings
- Number of employees: 182
- Website: http://www.fusosha.co.jp

Fusosha Publishing (株式会社扶桑社, Kabushiki Kaisha Fusōsha) is a Japanese publishing company wholly owned by Fuji Media Holdings and part of the Fujisankei Communications Group.

== History ==
Fuji TV established Living Magazine Co., Ltd as a publishing business. In 1984, the company name was changed from Living Magazine Co., Ltd to Fusosha Co., Ltd.

In 1987, Fusosha Co., Ltd merged with Sankyo Publishing Co., Ltd, a division of Sankei Shimbun, itself also part the Fujisankei Communications Group.

In 2007, Fuji TV acquired additional shares of Fusosha and Pony Canyon to make them wholly owned subsidiaries.

Among Fusosha's publications are magazines like Spa! and Esse. Mamor, the official magazine of the Japan Self-Defense Forces, has been published by Fusosha since 2006.

In addition to the numerous magazines and textbooks it has published, Fusosha has sold monograph for programs of its sister companies Fuji TV and Nippon Broadcasting System, including All Night Nippon and Waratte Iitomo!.
