= WaT =

Japanese musical duo

- Origin: Japan
- Genres: J-pop
- Years active: 2002–2016
- Labels: Universal Music (A&M)
- Members: Eiji Wentz; Teppei Koike
- Website: Universal Music Official Web Site

WaT (pronounced "Watto" ワット, for Wentz and Teppei) was a Japanese duo composed of singers/songwriters Eiji Wentz and Teppei Koike. They met each other in 2002 and formed WaT, playing live street performances with their guitars. Their debut single, "Boku no Kimochi", was released in 2005. Wentz, who is half German-American and half Japanese, is also a TV personality. Koike is also known as an actor and can play the harmonica. "Boku no Kimochi" reached the second place on the Oricon chart.

== Members ==
- Eiji Wentz (from Tokyo)
- Teppei Koike (from Osaka)

Both of them play vocals and guitar. Wentz also plays the bass guitar and piano. Teppei also plays the harmonica and ukulele.

== Discography ==
=== Singles ===
Their first independent single, "Sotsugyō Time", was released on February 18, 2004, under independent label and was later included on their first album.

Original Japanese title	Romanized name	Translation of title	Release date	Chart position
僕のキモチ	Boku no Kimochi	My Feelings	2005-11-02	2
5センチ。	Go Senchi.	5 cm	2006-01-25	2
Hava Rava			2006-08-02	4
Ready Go!			2006-11-01	1
ボクラノLove Story	Bokura no Love Story	Our Love Story	2006-12-06	4
夢の途中	Yume no Tochū	Midway Through a Dream	2008-01-16	4
時を越えて~Fantastic World~	Toki o Koete: Fantastic World	Pass Through Time: Fantastic World	2008-04-23	8
36°C	36 do	36 Degrees	2008-10-29	5
君が僕にKissをした	Kimi ga boku ni kiss o shita	You Kissed Me	2010-07-29	5
24/7〜もう一度〜	24/7~ Mou Ichido	24/7: One More Time	2010-09-08	3

=== Albums ===
Original Japanese title	Romanized name	Translation of title	Release date	Chart position
卒業TIME ~僕らのはじまり~	Sotsugyō Time: Bokura no Hajimari	Graduation Time: Our Beginning	2006-03-01	2
WaT Collection			2007-11-28	4
卒業BEST	Sotsugyou BEST	Graduation BEST	2016-02-10	7

=== DVDs ===
Title	Release date
WaT Live Tour 2008"凶×小吉=大吉TOUR"@日比谷野外大音楽堂	2008-07-30
WaT Music Video Collection	2008-05-28
WaT Entertainment Show 2006 Act "do" Live Vol.4	2006-04-26
My Favorite Girl-the movie-	2006-12-20
