= Mamor =

Japanese military magazine

- August 2020 cover with Akari Kitō as the "Goddess of the Defenders"
- Editor: Takaku Yutaka
- Categories: Military
- Frequency: Monthly
- Publisher: Fusosha Publishing
- Founded: 2005; 21 years ago
- First issue: January 21, 2007; 19 years ago
- Language: Japanese
- Website: mamor-web.jp

Mamor (stylized in all caps) is the official magazine of the Japan Self-Defense Forces. Launched in 2005 by Fusosha Publishing, it is the public relations organ for the JSDF and Ministry of Defense, providing coverage of life in the Japanese military.

Takaku Yutaka has served as editor-in-chief since the magazine's creation.

The magazine is notable for its covers of female models in military uniform nicknamed "Goddesses of the Defenders". These covers, which include gravure idols and celebrities, are intended to help Mamor appeal to younger audiences.

== History ==
In 2005, Fusosha Publishing opened a customized publication department to accept commissions from corporations. With the publishing industry undergoing a recession, the department sought a client with enough funding to give them a large order. Yutaka, who has worked at Fusosha since 1987 and did not have much of an opinion on the military at the time, suggested the JSDF since he previously did a feature on the armed forces as the deputy editor-in-chief of SPA! Mamor was created as inspiration; the name is a play on "mamoru", the Japanese word for "protect".

At the time, the Ministry of Defense self published a magazine called Securitarian that was only available for active duty personnel. The ministry was encouraged to partner with a private publisher that would bring their coverage to a broader audience. Bids were heard from three interested publishers before Fusosha and Mamor were selected. Production began in 2007.

Whereas Securitarian was presented in a serious manner, Fusosha was tasked to "create a magazine for people of all ages and genders". Taking into account the younger age range for magazines, Yutaka focused on men in their twenties and thirties as the target audience. In 2009, Mamor introduced a dating advice and matchmaking column that increased readership among women.

== Content ==
Fusosha fully operates and produces the magazine by themselves, though they have oversight from the Self-Defense Forces. Personnel from the SDF and Ministry of Defense also review and proofread the content before purchasing copies to sell. As the official PR arm of both entities, Mamor's staff has grappled with photos and text that cannot be published if they include classified information.

The magazine also has general sections such as cooking recipes, horoscopes, and personal profiles. Manga strips are featured as well.

In contrast, articles about military affairs are mostly depicted in black and white save for the "Military Report".

Issues are released on the 21st of each month.

== Covers ==
Mamor is known for its covers with female celebrities in military uniform on bases and other JSDF installations, who are nicknamed the "Goddess of the Defenders" (防人たちの女神). For instance, the May 2025 edition had bikini model Ina Enohara wearing the winter dress uniform of the Maritime Self-Defense Force and saluting in front of the JS Kumano at the Yokosuka Naval Base.

During the magazine's first year, its covers were of JSDF hardware such as vehicles. Images of gravure idols and models were occasionally weaved into stories, though Mamor was still treated as a military-only publication. To better appeal to young men, Yutaka suggested putting the women on the covers, which the ministry permitted "as long as there's a reason for it." March 2008 was the first issue with a Goddess of the Defenders on the cover. The models are depicted posing or doing tasks related to a story within their respective issue. For example, the September 2019 cover had Ayaka Onuki on a minesweeper while the accompanying feature article focused on said ships. They usually post their experiences during the photoshoots on social media as well, which Yutaka noted increases online awareness for the magazine.

After Yuta Kikuchi became lead editor in 2017, the covers diversified to include anime voice actresses since he is a fan of the medium. Under his direction, actresses like Ayana Taketatsu and Akari Kitō were respectively on the July 2017 and August 2020 issues.

Once a year, the magazine opts to have JSDF servicewomen rather than celebrities. The April 2011 issue did not have a Goddess of the Defender as the magazine instead focused on the JSDF's response to the Tōhoku earthquake and tsunami.

Male figures have appeared like actors Keita Machida, Kazuhiko Nishimura, and Hiroshi Tamaki along with JS Seiryū captain Daisuke Watanabe. Tamaki's cover was to promote the film Yukikaze. Starting with the January 2027 issue, male cover models adopted the moniker "Hero of the Defenders" (防人の勇姿).

Fictional characters have also been included on the covers. Miho Nishizumi from Girls und Panzer was on December 2013's alongside her voice actress Mai Fuchigami in tandem with a story about the Type 10 tank. The February 2019 issue included a collaboration with the anime series Girly Air Force; all 30 thousand copies made were sold out, making the issue the highest selling for Mamor. For May 2022, Yume Shinjo was co-featured on the cover with Laid-Back Camp protagonist Nadeshiko Kagamihara for a special about the Ground Self-Defense Force's camping methods. The February 2025 cover had Omaneko and Hamu Chunchun, the mascots of an Air Self-Defense Force submarine base in Omaezaki; it garnered criticism from Nago City Council member Yuzo Takayama, who called it "utterly disgusting" since the characters do not wear pants.

In 2015, Chen Mei of Chinese newspaper Jiemian News compared Mamor's covers to those from People's Liberation Army magazines, which have male military personnel. Chen quipped, "If you want to stand out from the crowd of identical dudes, MAMOR wins hands down."
