= Umeka Shōji =

Japanese voice actress

- 庄司 宇芽香
- Born: Odawara, Kanagawa Prefecture, Japan
- Occupation: Voice actress
- Years active: 2000–present
- Agent: Aoni Production

Umeka Shōji (庄司 宇芽香, Shōji Umeka) is a Japanese voice actress from Kanagawa Prefecture. She is affiliated with Aoni Production and has voiced for various anime, video games, and television shows since beginning her career in 2005. Her major roles in video games include Coyori in Battle Fantasia, Caelea in Deception IV: Blood Ties, Aki Koriyama in Tokimeki Memorial 4. Starting with Samurai Warriors 3, she voices characters Hanbei Takenaka and Ayagozen as well in Warriors Orochi 3 and Amane Sumeragi in Waccha PriMagi!.

== Filmography ==
=== Anime ===
2009

- One Piece as Ran

2010

- One Piece as Inazuma (female version)

2014

- World Trigger as Mizunuma-sensei

2015

- World Trigger as Yūko Kumagai, Itsuki Fujisawa, Yū Kunichika

2016

- Digimon Universe: Appli Monsters as Eri Karan
- Sailor Moon Crystal as Cyprine, Ptilol

2017

- Kakegurui as Saori

2018

- GeGeGe no Kitarō as Neko-Musume
- Harukana Receive as Marissa Thomas

2019

- Kakegurui ×× as Saori

2020

- Fly Me to the Moon as young Nasa
- One Piece as Solitaire

2021

- Waccha PriMagi! as Amane Sumeragi

2022

- Spy × Family as Camilla

2023

- Birth of Kitarō: The Mystery of GeGeGe as Neko-Musume

2025

- Sanda as Shiori Fuyumura

=== Video games ===
2004

- The Legend of Heroes: Trails in the Sky, Josette Capua

2007

- Battle Fantasia as Coyori

2009

- Samurai Warriors 3, Hanbei Takenaka, Ayagozen
- Tokimeki Memorial 4, Aki Koriyama

2014

- Closers, Ash
- Deception IV: Blood Ties, Caelea
- Samurai Warriors 4, Hanbei Takenaka, Ayagozen

2015

- Kemono Friends as Dodo, Genbu, Chukar Partridge, Jungle Cat, Sumatran Rhinoceros, Markhor and Greater Bird-of-Paradise

2018

- God Eater 3, Hilda Henriquez
- Super Smash Bros. Ultimate (Mii Fighter Type 2/12)

2020

- Touhou Spell Bubble, Sakuya Izayoi

2021

- Fate/Grand Order as Zenobia

2023

- Forspoken as Frey

2025

- Wuthering Waves as Galbrena

Unknown date

- Wonderland Online game Maid no Aoi-san (Fuyu-fuku), Windows

=== Dubbing ===
- Annabelle Comes Home, Daniela Rios (Katie Sarife)
- Brightburn, Brandon Breyer / Brightburn (Jackson A. Dunn)
- The Grudge, Detective Muldoon (Andrea Riseborough)
- The Pale Horse, Hermia Easterbrook (Kaya Scodelario)
- Proven Innocent, Madeline Scott (Rachelle Lefevre)
- Richard Jewell, Kathy Scruggs (Olivia Wilde)
- Vincenzo, Hong Cha-young (Jeon Yeo-been)
- Younger, Lauren Heller (Molly Bernard)

=== Animation ===
- Fish Hooks - Bea Golfishberg
