= Teppei Koike =

Japanese actor and singer

Teppei Koike 小池 徹平
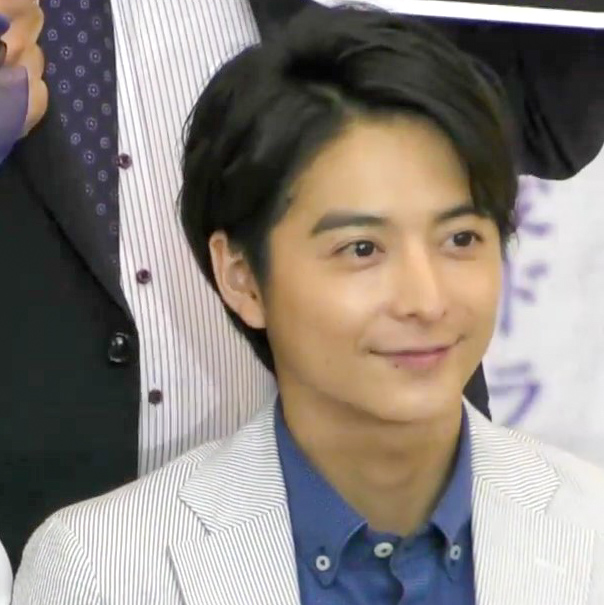
- 2019

Background information
- Born: January 5, 1986 (age 40); Ōsakasayama, Osaka, Japan
- Genre: J-pop
- Occupations: Singer-songwriter, actor
- Instrument: Guitar
- Years active: 2002–present
- Labels: Universal Music Group, A&M
- Formerly of: WaT
- Website: teppei.fanmo.jp

Teppei Koike (小池 徹平, Koike Teppei; born January 5, 1986) is a Japanese actor and singer associated with Burning Productions. After appearing in the television drama Tentai Kansoku in 2002, Koike began appearing in several other films and dramas, notably as Atsushi Otani in Love Com. At the same time, Koike was also in the music duo WaT with Eiji Wentz from 2002 to 2016.

== Career ==
2002

- Moved to Tokyo in the spring. Changed schools to Horikoshi High (also attended at the same time as NEWS' Tomohisa Yamashita & Yuya Tegoshi, D-BOYS' Yu Shirota, Japanese actor and singer Toma Ikuta and KAT-TUN's Koki Tanaka)
- Met Eiji Wentz while working and formed WaT. Started doing street lives.
- Debuted as an actor in the drama Tentai Kansoku.

2004

- WaT released debut indies C.D. Sotsugyō Time in June.

2005

- Acted in the drama Gokusen 2 (January 15 – March 19), which was part of the reason for his increasing popularity.
- Appeared as Hideki Ogata, a major, regular character in the TBS television drama "Dragon Zakura" (July – September 2005), alongside his high school fellow Tomohisa Yamashita.
- WaT signs with Universal Music in August, releases first major single Boku no Kimochi in November, reaching second place on the Oricon chart. They are the band with the shortest time gap between debut and appearing on NHK's Kōhaku Uta Gassen.
- Released his first photobook, First Letter From Teppei.

2006

- Presented with the Newcomer's forty-third Golden Arrow Award (WaT).
- Presented with the twentieth Gold Disc Award for "Best New Artist".
- First leading role in the movie Lovely Complex as Atsushi Otani.
- Official supporter in 2006's International Volleyball Tournament (WaT).
- Nominated for the Best Supporting Actor in the forty-ninth Drama Academy Award, for his performance in Iryu.
- Released his second photobook, Kiss me, Kiss me.
- On New Year's Eve, WaT performed for the second time in N.H.K.'s Kōhaku.
- Acted in the drama Iryu, as Ijyuuin.

2007

- First music solo project was announced on January tenth.
- His story of leaving his family and hometown to pursue his dream to be a performer was turned into a fifty-two pages one shot manga entitled Bokura no Ibasho by Nakahara Aya, the author of the manga Lovely Complex.
- Solo single, Kimi ni Okuru Uta, was released on February fourteen, Valentine's Day, with Wentz's solo song Lucky de Happy as the B-side song.
- Solo album, Pieces was released on June 27.

2015

- Performed as "L" in the Death Note musical in Tokyo, Osaka and Nagoya, Japan, premiere April 6, 2015.

== Filmography ==
=== Film ===
Year	Title	Role	Notes	Ref.
2005	Taga Tame ni	Boy		
2006	Love Com	Atsushi Ōtani		
2006	My Favorite Girl: The Movie		Direct-to-video	
2008	Kids	Asato		
2008	The Homeless Student	Hiroshi Tamura		
2009	Gokusen: The Movie	Keita Takeda		
2009	Genkai in a Black Company	Masao Ōneta		
2011	Salaryman Neo	Makoto Shinjō		
2016	Sabuibo Mask	Gonsuke		
2018	Eating Women	Yūta		
2018	Lock-On Love	Takatsugu Masaki		
2019	The Confidence Man JP: The Movie			

=== Television ===
Year	Title	Role	Network	Notes	Ref(s)
2002	Searchin' For My Polestar	Noboru Yamada	CX		
2003	Okāsan to Issho	Naoki Kobayakawa	CX		
2003	Anata no Jinsei o Hakobishimasu!	Yoshimatsu Kogure	TBS		
2003	Yankee Bokō ni Kaeru	Motoya Murase	TBS		
2004	Water Boys 2	Iwao Iwata	CX		
2004	Division 1: Hōkago	Kaname Komiya	CX		
2005	Gokusen 2	Keita Takeda	NTV		
2005	Dragon Sakura	Hideki Ogata	TBS		
2005	Oniyome Nikki	Ryōsuke Sawamura	CX		
2006	Iryū	Noboru Ijūin	CX		
2007	Iryū 2	Noboru Ijūin	CX		
2007	Mada Minu Chichi e, Haha e	Tsutomu Aragaki	CX	Television film	
2008	Shibatora	Taketora Shibata	CX		
2008	The Homeless Student	Man	CX	Television film	
2009	Chelsea Hotel e Yōkoso		CX		
2009	Ohitorisama	Shinichi Kamisaka	TBS		
2010	Tetsu no Hone	Heita Tomishima	NHK		
2010	Iryū 3	Noboru Ijūin	CX		
2011	Propose Kyōdai	Jirō Yamada	CX		
2012	Joi Kuraishi Shōko	Shun Kamata	CX		
2012	Naniwa Shōnen Tanteidan	Shūhei Shindō	TBS		
2012	Doroctor	Shinichi Nakamura	NHK BS Premium		
2013	Amachan	Hiroshi Adachi	NHK	Asadora	
2013	Nigakute, Amai: Kibō no Cha	Kōta Hayakawa	NHK		
2014	Iryū 4	Noboru Ijūin	CX		
2014	Borderline	Akira Kawabata	NHK		
2015	Konkatsu Keiji	Tsutsuji Fujioka	YTV		
2015	Sabu to Ichi Torimono Hikae	Satake	BS4	Television film	
2016	Chikaemon	Tokubei	NHK		
2017	Senju Crazy Boy	Kō Saitō	NHK BS Premium	Television film	
2017	Reverse	Yoshiki Hirosawa	TBS		
2018	Dai Renai: Boku o Wasureru-kun to	Kōhei Matsuo	TBS	Episode 6	
2020	Guilty: Kono Koi wa Tsumi desu ka?	Kazuma Ogino	YTV, NTV		
2021	Reach Beyond the Blue Sky	Sanai Hashimoto	NHK	Taiga drama	
2021	Dragon Sakura 2	Hideki Ogata	TBS	Cameo	

== Variety TV shows ==
- Ame ni mo makezu! (Fuji Terebi) – host along with his partner, Wentz.

== Solo discography ==
=== Singles ===
List of singles, with selected chart positions, sales figures and certifications
Title	Year	Peak chart positions	Sales	Album
Title	Year	JPN	Sales	Album
"Kimi ni Okuru Uta" (君に贈る歌)	2007	—	—N/a	Pieces
My Brand New Way	2007	—	—N/a	Pieces
"Kimi Dake" (キミだけ)	2009	4	—N/a	Jack In The Box
"—" denotes releases that did not chart or were not released in that region.

=== Albums ===
- 2007-06-27: pieces, which contains 12 self-penned songs
- 2009-07-15: Jack in the Box . Debut position & 1st week sales – No. 15; 10,580

== Awards ==
=== Japan Academy Prize ===
Year	Nominee / work	Award	Result
2009	The Homeless Student	Newcomer of the Year	Won
