= Shukan Jitsuwa =

Japanese weekly men's magazine

Shukan Jitsuwa (週刊実話, Shūkan Jitsuwa; lit. "Weekly True Stories") is a Japanese weekly tabloid magazine for men published by Nihon Journal Shuppan, first issued in September 1958. It contains stories of popular interest and nude photographs.

In September 2003, journalist Leo Lewis noted that Japan's weekly news magazines (including Shukan Jitsuwa) were "the last bastion of serious investigative journalism in Japan" and further states that the lurid covers with semi-naked girls may entice "but the real action between the covers is very often deadly serious journalism.". Lewis' report was also noticed in the 2004 Annual Report of the international organization Reporters sans frontières.
