= List of Ultimate Universe characters =

List of characters appearing in the Ultimate Universe imprint by Marvel Comics

This is a list of characters from Marvel Comics that appear in the Ultimate Universe (2023–present). For characters from the Ultimate Marvel imprint (2001–2015) see List of Ultimate Marvel characters.

== Introduced in Ultimate Invasion ==
Character	First appearance	Notes	References
Liz Allan	Ultimate Invasion #1 (June 2023)		
Peter Parker Spider-Man	Ultimate Invasion #1 (June 2023)	An adult Peter Parker. Married to Mary Jane and having two children, he has an ordinary life until an Origin-Machine is gifted to him by Tony Stark and he finds out about how The Maker tampered with his life. He accepts the catalyst inside the box, and becomes Spider-Man. Writer Jonathan Hickman said that he was inspired by the version of the character seen in the film Spider-Man: Into the Spider-Verse.	
Aida Viper	Ultimate Invasion #2 (July 2023)	Aida is a member of the Maker's Council, "Voice of the Rising Sun" and second-in-command to Emperor Sunfire. She oversees the Children of the Atom.	
Bruce Banner Hulk	Ultimate Invasion #2 (July 2023)	A member of the Maker's Council. Formerly the director of the Castle Gamma project, Bruce Banner is said to have turned towards religion to control his rage, taking the mantle and powers of the Iron Fist. Banner rules India and China, having colonized the city of K'un-L'un and the other Capital Cities of Heaven, with the Immortal Weapons as his lieutenants. Banner nearly successfully kills the core Ultimates before later being overthrown by Shen Qi and a rebellious Heaven; he is ultimately executed by She-Hulk.	
Fenris Wolf	Ultimate Invasion #2 (July 2023)		
Ben Grimm	Ultimate Invasion #2 (July 2023)		
Kenuichio Harada Silver Samurai	Ultimate Invasion #2 (July 2023)	Kenuichio Harada is an armored samurai and member of the Maker's Council. He is a lead enforcer of Emperor Sunfire and Viper, being one of the key figures of the Harada-Yoshida Alliance that rules Hi No Kuni.	
Hogun	Ultimate Invasion #2 (July 2023)		
Jarvis	Ultimate Invasion #2 (July 2023)		
Loki Laufeyson	Ultimate Invasion #2 (July 2023)		
Thor Odinson	Ultimate Invasion #2 (July 2023)	An exiled Asgardian god who is freed by Stark and Doom and hopes to take back his throne from Loki.	
Illyana Rasputin Magik	Ultimate Invasion #2 (July 2023)	Illyana Rasputin is a member of the Maker's Council and Tsarina of Limbo. She aids her brother in ruling the Eurasian Republic and Limbo as part of the Rasputin family.	
Piotr Rasputin Colossus	Ultimate Invasion #2 (July 2023)	Piotr Rasputin is a member of the Maker's Council, leader of the Rasputin family, and Supreme Leader of the Eurasian Republic. He fashions himself a Tsar as his power bloc attempts to enforce control over its Mutant population. Rasputin is killed by the Phoenix Specimen after Wolverine frees her.	
Reed Richards Doom / Doctor Doom	Ultimate Invasion #2 (July 2023)	The Reed Richards of Earth-6160 was imprisoned in the City after the Maker sabotaged the flight that would have led to creation of the Fantastic Four. While lacking superpowers, Richards is an intellectual rival to that of the Maker, and knows all his secrets, being a lead strategist among the Ultimates.	
Arkady Rossovich Omega Red	Ultimate Invasion #2 (July 2023)	Arkady Rossovich is a member of the Maker's Council. He is the leading enforcer of the Rasputins and a key figure in the political hierarchy of the Eurasian Republic. During a confrontation with the Opposition at the Chernobyl Nuclear Power Plant, Omega Red is killed by Wolverine.	
Sif	Ultimate Invasion #2 (July 2023)	A warrior goddess of Asgard and Thor's former prison warden who joins the Ultimates after learning about Loki's deception that led him to take Asgard's throne.	
Obadiah Stane War Machine	Ultimate Invasion #2 (July 2023)	Stane is the public face of Stark/Stane, and until the events of Ultimate Invasion #2, the only one in contact with the rest of the Council. Stane convinces Howard to attend a Council meeting, before being killed defending him during an attack by Kang.	
Howard Stark Iron Man / Immortus	Ultimate Invasion #2 (July 2023)	Howard Stark is a genius inventor who operates as Iron Man in this universe. Stark's aloof and avoidant tendencies led him to ignorance about the Council, generally preferring to ignore politics altogether; when enlisted by the Maker to perfect the Immortus Engine, Stark was so repulsed he sabotaged the City to trap him there. His efforts to sustain his captivity gradually drive him insane, adopting the name Immortus before being killed shortly after reuniting with Tony.	
Tony Stark Iron Lad	Ultimate Invasion #2 (July 2023)	Tony Stark is the son of Howard Stark. After Howard and the Maker were trapped alongside Kang inside the City in Latveria at the end of Ultimate Invasion, Tony took the name "Iron Lad" to honor his father, while not finding himself yet worthy of the Iron Man title. Knowing the City would open again in a year, he starts the Ultimates Network to take back the world from the Maker's Council and end The Maker's regime.	
Johnny Storm	Ultimate Invasion #2 (July 2023)		
Sue Storm	Ultimate Invasion #2 (July 2023)		
Volstagg	Ultimate Invasion #2 (July 2023)		
Shiro Yoshida Emperor Sunfire	Ultimate Invasion #2 (July 2023)	Shiro Yoshida is a member of the Maker's Council, Emperor of Hi No Kuni and leader of the Harada-Yoshida Alliance, a union of clans who rule the former Japanese territories.	
Emmanuel da Costa	Ultimate Invasion #3 (August 2023)	Emmanuel da Costa is a Brazilian oligarch who is the Black King of the Hellfire Club and ruler of the Society of South America. He is able to temporarily replicate mutant powers after receiving blood transfusions from them.	
Henri Dugarry Captain Britain	Ultimate Invasion #3 (August 2023)	Henri Duggary is a French nobleman and ruler of the European Coalition who is a member of the Maker's Council. Having taken the mantle of Captain Britain, he also controls Avalon and the East Coast of the former United States. Wilson Fisk answers to him.	
Kang the Conqueror	Ultimate Invasion #3 (August 2023)		
Khonshu Moon Knight	Ultimate Invasion #3 (August 2023)	The title of Moon Knight is given to the dual and mutual unity between Khonshu and Ra, as both undertake war efforts in order to annex Wakanda, searching for a mysterious element opposite to vibranium and attempting to hold the African continent in the Maker's absence.	
Ra Moon Knight	Ultimate Invasion #3 (August 2023)	The title of Moon Knight is given to the dual and mutual unity between Khonshu and Ra, as both undertake war efforts in order to annex Wakanda, searching for a mysterious element opposite to vibranium and attempting to hold the African continent in the Maker's absence.	
Steve Rogers Captain America	Ultimate Invasion #4 (September 2023)	Frozen in the Arctic at the end of WWII, Rogers was retrieved by Doom and Stark before the Maker could find him. Once awakened, Rogers finds that the United States do not exist as a country anymore, as a result of the Maker's schemes. He becomes one of the leading figures of the Ultimates, driven to defeat the council.	

== Introduced in Ultimate Spider-Man ==
Character	First appearance	Notes	References
Betty Brant	Ultimate Spider-Man vol. 3 #1 (January 2024)		
Bullseyes	Ultimate Spider-Man vol. 3 #1 (January 2024)	The Bullseyes are a marksman assassin group employed by the Maker's Council to eliminate individuals they considered a threat to their objectives. They are devoted to Duggary, even taking out their left eyes when he lost his in a struggle between him and Stark. Some have been assigned to work for Kingpin.	
Wilson Fisk Kingpin	Ultimate Spider-Man vol. 3 #1 (January 2024)	Wilson Fisk is a loyalist of the Maker's Council who answers to Henri Duggary and has the Daily Bugle under his control. Fisk rules over New York as its appointed Shadow Governor, his title of Kingpin of Manhattan being an open secret in the criminal underworld. The Sinister Six act as his enforcers and lieutenants, each one having control over a specific borough of the city.	
J. Jonah Jameson	Ultimate Spider-Man vol. 3 #1 (January 2024)	A close friend to the Parkers and former editor-in-chief of the Daily Bugle who quits alongside Ben Parker to create The Paper as an independent news outlet, joining him in investigating the Stark Tower attack.	
Matt Murdock	Ultimate Spider-Man vol. 3 #1 (January 2024)	A blind priest who takes part in memorial events for the victims of the Stark Tower attack.	
Harry Osborn Green Goblin	Ultimate Spider-Man vol. 3 #1 (January 2024)	Heir to Oscorp after his father's death during a false flag attack conducted by the Maker's Council. He discovers the truth about the Council's involvement in the incident and repurposes Stark technology to become the Green Goblin. He eventually becomes a friend to Peter Parker and an ally against the Kingpin's rule over New York City.	
Ben Parker	Ultimate Spider-Man vol. 3 #1 (January 2024)	Ben Parker is the former managing editor of the Daily Bugle who quits alongside J. Jonah Jameson to create The Paper as an independent news outlet and gradually uncovers the conspiracy behind the Stark Tower attack.	
May Parker	Ultimate Spider-Man vol. 3 #1 (January 2024)	May Parker is the daughter of Mary Jane Watson and Peter Parker, who is their youngest child. She is the first to find out about her father's alter ego as Spider-Man and soon comes to support him, helping him redesign his suit and keeping his secret for a while before the rest of her family learns about it.	
Richard Parker	Ultimate Spider-Man vol. 3 #1 (January 2024)	Richard Parker is the son of Mary Jane Watson and Peter Parker who is named after his grandfather. He uses his father's picotech suit to act as Spider-Man when he goes missing, becoming the unofficial Venom.	
Robbie Robertson Mysterio	Ultimate Spider-Man vol. 3 #1 (January 2024)	Robbie Robertson is the editor-in-chief of the Daily Bugle after J. Jonah Jameson leaves the newspaper. He eventually becomes an informant for Jameson during his efforts to investigate the Stark Tower attack.	
Mary Jane Watson	Ultimate Spider-Man vol. 3 #1 (January 2024)	Mary Jane "M.J." Watson is Peter Parker's wife and mother to Richard and May. She is a successful publicist who later becomes involved with Ben Parker and J. Jonah Jameson's initiative at founding The Paper as an independent news company to counter the Fisk-run Daily Bugle. M.J. eventually learns about Peter's alter ego, supporting him and naming him Spider-Man.	
Shocker	Ultimate Spider-Man vol. 3 #2 (February 2024)	A low-life criminal who steals technology from a Stark "Origin-Machine" given to someone who died of a heart attack and uses it to commit robberies. He took advantage of Spider-Man's gullibility twice. Shocker was later apprehended by Green Goblin.	
Gwen Stacy Mysterio	Ultimate Spider-Man vol. 3 #4 (April 2024)	Harry Osborn's wife. She aids her husband at running Oscorp, supporting his activities as the Green Goblin after both learn the truth about the Stark Tower attack. She eventually invests in The Paper and becomes an acquaintance to the Parkers. She is a member of a group of Mysterios who has infiltrated Wilson Fisk's criminal empire and gained control of Brooklyn.	
Otto Octavius Superior Spider-Man	Ultimate Spider-Man vol. 3 #5 (May 2024)	A former prodigy and protégé of Norman Osborn who becomes a leading scientist at Oscorp and works for Harry Osborn, performing reverse engineering on Stark technology to create the Green Goblin suit. Doctor Octopus would later develop his own Spider-Man suit that made him "feel superior".	
Emily Osborn	Ultimate Spider-Man vol. 3 #5 (May 2024)		
Norman Osborn	Ultimate Spider-Man vol. 3 #5 (May 2024)		
Felicia Hardy Black Cat	Ultimate Spider-Man vol. 3 #8 (August 2024)	The daughter of Walter Hardy. She later reluctantly takes over in his stead and becomes the second Black Cat after Walter was recuperating from a building fall. Felicia later meets Richard Parker's Spider-Man appearance and befriends him.	
Walter Hardy Black Cat	Ultimate Spider-Man vol. 3 #8 (August 2024)	A retired burglar who becomes an associate of Wilson Fisk, controlling the Bronx as one of the Sinister Six. He was injured when knocked off a building while fighting Spider-Man and Green Goblin, leading him to become paralyzed.	
Sergei Kravinoff Kraven the Hunter	Ultimate Spider-Man vol. 3 #8 (August 2024)	Sergei Kravinoff is a billionaire oligarch whose family was excommunicated from Russia during the "Rasputin Purge" and known as the Hunter of Staten Island. Kravioff operates as one of the Sinister Six. He manages to capture Spider-Man and the Green Goblin, releasing them on the Savage Land in order to hunt them. While fooled into thinking that he killed Harry Osborn by Mysterio, Kraven was then killed by Mysterio.	
Martin Li Mister Negative	Ultimate Spider-Man vol. 3 #8 (August 2024)	Martin Li is the CEO of the F.E.A.S.T Foundation while running the Demons Gang in secret. He controls Queens on behalf of the Kingpin as one of the Sinister Six.	
Mole Man	Ultimate Spider-Man vol. 3 #8 (August 2024)	A member of the Sinister Six who controls the Underground of New York City, using his Moloids as a personal army of sorts while also controlling a surviving sector of the Savage Land in Subterranea. He allowed Kraven the Hunter to have his "great hunt" on Peter Parker and Harry Osborn in the Savage Land, though Mole Man secretly helped them on Mysterio's orders. Mole Man would later allow Peter's family to take refuge in Subterranea.	
James Wesley Mysterio	Ultimate Spider-Man vol. 3 #8 (August 2024)	Wilson Fisk's personal assistant. Mister Negative would later learn of his connection and make him a suicide bomber to take them out. However, they pulled off a spell to save themselves by fusing into a Mysterio Conglomerate.	
Quentin Beck Mysterio	Ultimate Spider-Man vol. 3 #11 (November, 2024)		
Gayle Watson	Ultimate Spider-Man vol. 3 #12 (December 2024)	Gayle Watson was the daughter of Madeline Watson and sister of MJ Watson. Gayle used to said to her sister that she was lucky to have her, but not in a nice way. After MJ married Peter Parker, Gayle told her that she was wasting her life and that having children would only make her mistakes permanent. Gayle and MJ stopped talking for years, despite this, she invited her every year to her family Christmas party, but Gayle never assisted. Gayle married a man named Douglas. However, he had an affair for several years and after Gayle found out, she decided to divorce him.	
Madeline Watson	Ultimate Spider-Man vol. 3 #12 (December 2024)	Madeline Watson was the mother of MJ and Gayle Watson. Madeline married three times, having divorced and widowed. She is a world traveler.	
William Baker Sandman	Ultimate Spider-Man vol. 3 #15 (March 2025)	William Baker is a man who was captured by A.I.M. when he stumbled upon their facility where illegal experiments are performed and gained sand-based abilities from one of those experiments.	
George Stacy Mysterio	Ultimate Spider-Man vol. 3 #16 (April 2025)	The father of Gwen Stacy. He was revealed to have been a member of the Mysterio prior to his death.	
Aihan Li	Ultimate Spider-Man vol. 3 #18 (June 2025)	Aihan Li is the older sister of Mister Negative.	
Anti-Venom	Ultimate Spider-Man vol. 3 #24 (February 2026)		

== Introduced in Ultimate Black Panther ==
Character	First appearance	Notes	References
Erik Killmonger	Ultimate Black Panther #1 (February 2024)	An insurgent who leaves Wakanda in order to fight against the Upper and Lower Kingdoms and their domain over Africa. He eventually becomes a valuable ally to T'Challa against Khonshu and Ra.	
Ororo Munroe Storm / Wind-Rider	Ultimate Black Panther #1 (February 2024)	Also known as the Wind-Rider, Storm operates alongside Killmonger during their insurgency against the Upper and Lower Kingdoms, eventually joining T'Challa.	
Okoye	Ultimate Black Panther #1 (February 2024)	Okoye is the High Mentor of the Dora Milaje and its former General who is T'Challa's wife in an arranged marriage, supporting him during the war efforts against the Upper and Lower Kingdoms.	
Shuri	Ultimate Black Panther #1 (February 2024)	T'Challa's sister who is tied to the Dora Milaje and defends a proactive approach against the Upper and Lower Kingdoms.	
T'Chaka	Ultimate Black Panther #1 (February 2024)		
T'Challa Black Panther	Ultimate Black Panther #1 (February 2024)	The King of Wakanda. T'Challa takes the throne after his father is killed in a terrorist attack ordered by the Upper and Lower Kingdoms, declaring war against Khonshu and Ra's rule over the African continent as he gradually learns about vibranium and its opposite element's mysterious properties.	
Inan	Ultimate Black Panther #9 (October 2024)	The current Sorcerer Supreme. She is rescued from a H.A.N.D. facility by Killmonger and Storm and brought to Wakanda in order to help uncover more about vibranium's mysterious properties.	

=== Vodu-Khan ===
The Vodu-Khan are a group of female seers and mystics who hold a position of influence in Wakanda. They would later be in alliance with Z'Non and use Storm to give birth to the Child of Light.

==== Matron Imala ====
Matron Imala is the leader of the Vodu-Khan. Despite T'Challa's reluctance in trusting her, she advises him during key points of his war efforts.

=== Moon Knight Soldiers ===
The Moon Knight Soldiers are foot soldiers who work for Khonshu and Ra.

=== Bast ===
Bast is the cat god who the Wakandans worship.

=== Z'Non ===
Z'Non is the spirit of vibranium.

== Introduced in Ultimate X-Men ==
Character	First appearance	Notes	References
Shinobu Kageyama Shadow King	Ultimate X-Men vol. 2 #1 (March 2024)	A young mutant with strong psychic abilities and supremacist ideologies. He takes an interest in Hisako's powers and stalks her in an attempt to convince her to join him.	
Tsubasa	Ultimate X-Men vol. 2 #1 (March 2024)	A friend of Hisako, Tsubasa committed suicide after being bullied at school. Tsubasa is analogous to Wing, Hisako's friend from the mainstream continuity, who committed suicide after losing his powers.	
Mori	Ultimate X-Men vol. 2 #3 (May 2024)	A young student and Natsu's best friend, who eventually joins the X-Men in their efforts against the Children of the Atom. She is revealed to have the ability to regenerate her body parts.	
Nico Minoru Grimm	Ultimate X-Men vol. 2 #3 (May 2024)	A young mutant who claims to be from a family of psychics, becoming close to Mei and Hisako and later joining their efforts against the Shadow King and the Children of the Atom.	
Natsu Tsukishima	Ultimate X-Men vol. 2 #3 (May 2024)	A young student with a long history with the Children of the Atom. She has similar abilities to Scott Summers and is their equivalent on Earth-6160's X-Men, being able to shoot an optic blast from one eye.	
Makoto Amano	Ultimate X-Men vol.2 #4 (June 2024)	A member of Children of the Atom who has the ability to dematerialize his own body into smoke.	
Noriko Ashida Surge	Ultimate X-Men vol.2 #4 (June 2024)	Noriko Ashida is a young delinquent who was raised as one of the Children of the Atom and is Shinobu's best friend. She eventually becomes a rival to Mei.	
Fujiwara Maester	Ultimate X-Men vol.2 #6 (August 2024)	The leader of the Children of the Atom who is Earth-6160's version of Mister Sinister. He is a secretive and mysterious scientist who performs experiments relating to mutants and the X-gene itself under Viper's supervision, following her orders on behalf of Emperor Sunfire. He would later be killed by Kageyama.	
Kanon Sainouchi Psylocke	Ultimate X-Men vol. 2 #7 (September 2024)	Kanon Sainouchi is a senior student and expert fencer who claims to be a descendant of the legendary samurai Sai. She ends up being a key figure in exposing the Children of the Atom and becomes a runaway alongside her brother Tatsuya. She eventually meets Hisako and offers to train her, revealing herself as a mutant.	
Tatsuya Sainouchi	Ultimate X-Men vol. 2 #7 (September 2024)		
Yukio	Ultimate X-Men vol. 2 #8 (October 2024)	A content creator on the 8-Chome channel who focuses on urban investigation, taking an interest in Hisako and the mysterious cases relating to her former school.	
Akihiro	Ultimate X-Men vol. 2 #9 (November 2024)	A prisoner of the Children of the Atom whose mutant blood is used by the Maester. His mind appears to be fractured due to the experiments performed on him.	
Futaba	Ultimate X-Men vol. 2 #14 (April 2025)		
Yoru	Ultimate X-Men vol. 2 #24 (February 2026)		

== Introduced in The Ultimates ==
Character	First appearance	Notes	References
Hank Pym Giant-Man	The Ultimates vol. 4 #1 (June 2024)	Hank Pym is a reluctant hero who joins the Ultimates alongside his wife after their stint as exterminators. While having his genius intellect impaired by Nick Fury under the Maker's orders and hesitant to take on the mantle due to his Earth-616's counterpart and his turbulent history, he is convinced by Captain America and becomes a valuable member of the team.	
Janet van Dyne Wasp	The Ultimates vol. 4 #1 (June 2024)	Hank Pym's wife who joins the Ultimates alongside him after their stint as exterminators. The loss of the Pym Particles also prevented Janet van Dyne from becoming the Wasp, which she later learns due to Stark's Origin-Machine. Unlike Pym, she instantly accepts the offer to gain superpowers and adjusts faster to being a superhero. Unbeknownst to the Ultimates, Wasp is being used as a double agent for the Nick Fury L.M.D.	
Frank Castle Punisher	The Ultimates vol. 4 #2 (July 2024)		
America Chavez	The Ultimates vol. 4 #2 (July 2024)	A runaway from Earth-6160's erased future who is freed after Captain America, Iron Lad, Giant-Man and Wasp raid the White House where Midas used her as a power source. She later finds out about her former past as one of the Guardians of the Galaxy, but decides to stay with the Ultimates for a while.	
Galactus	The Ultimates vol. 4 #2 (July 2024)		
Midas	The Ultimates vol. 4 #2 (July 2024)	Owner of the Midas Group and a member of the Hellfire Club. He is shown as a loyalist of the Maker's Council whose function is acting as their man in the White House, using its underground to hold America Chavez captive before being defeated by Captain America and incapacitated in the process. While recuperating in a bunker, Midas is confronted and killed by America Chavez.	
Lejori Joena Zakaria She-Hulk	The Ultimates vol. 4 #3 (August 2024)	A native of Monster Island. She acquired her powers during Castle Gamma, the testing of a gamma bomb by Bruce Banner and the North American Union. Lejori was the only one of her people to develop functional super powers and vows to protect them, joining the Ultimates after Stark promises to help her in improving their conditions.	
Franklin Storm	The Ultimates vol. 4 #4 (September 2024)	The father of Sue and Johnny Storm.	
Charli Ramsey Hawkeye	The Ultimates vol. 4 #5 (October 2024)	Charli Ramsey, a Native-American of the Oglala Lakota Nation, found the rejected outfit and equipment that Stark had sent to the original Hawkeye Clint Barton. Using the technology, Ramsey becomes the new Hawkeye, later joining the Ultimates.	
Bride of Nine World-Breakers	The Ultimates vol. 4 #6 (November 2024)	A member of the Immortal Weapons.	
Crane Mother of the Bomb	The Ultimates vol. 4 #6 (November 2024)	A member of the Immortal Weapons.	
Decay's Beautiful Daughter	The Ultimates vol. 4 #6 (November 2024)	A member of the Immortal Weapons.	
Fat Cobra	The Ultimates vol. 4 #6 (November 2024)	A member of the Immortal Weapons. Fat Cobra is killed in battle by Wasp.	
Prince of Meltdowns	The Ultimates vol. 4 #6 (November 2024)	A member of the Immortal Weapons.	
Uranium Brother #235	The Ultimates vol. 4 #6 (November 2024)	A Member of the Immortal Weapons. Uranium Brother #235 is later killed by She-Hulk.	
Vance Astro Major Victory	The Ultimates vol. 4 #8 (January 2025)		
Captain Marvel	The Ultimates vol. 4 #8 (January 2025)	A blue-skinned alien and member of the Guardians of the Galaxy.	
Captain Universe	The Ultimates vol. 4 #8 (January 2025)		
Charlie-27	The Ultimates vol. 4 #8 (January 2025)	He died in the temporal crisis caused by "Unmaker".	
Fang	The Ultimates vol. 4 #8 (January 2025)		
Gary	The Ultimates vol. 4 #8 (January 2025)	A member of the Guardians of the Galaxy who wields the Infinity Gauntlet. He is killed when the Galan Field collapses.	
Giraud the Phoenix	The Ultimates vol. 4 #8 (January 2025)	A member of the Guardians of the Galaxy who wields the Phoenix Force. He is killed when the Galan Field collapses.	
Nikki Gold	The Ultimates vol. 4 #8 (January 2025)		
Hobgoblin	The Ultimates vol. 4 #8 (January 2025)		
Kallark Gladiator	The Ultimates vol. 4 #8 (January 2025)		
Magique	The Ultimates vol. 4 #8 (January 2025)		
Manta	The Ultimates vol. 4 #8 (January 2025)		
Molecule Boy	The Ultimates vol. 4 #8 (January 2025)		
Aleta Ogord	The Ultimates vol. 4 #8 (January 2025)	She died in the temporal crisis caused by "Unmaker".	
Stakar Ogord Starhawk	The Ultimates vol. 4 #8 (January 2025)	He died in the temporal crisis caused by Maker who the Guardians of the Galaxy called "Unmaker".	
Kenneth Connell Star Brand	The Ultimates vol. 4 #8 (January 2025)		
Starbolt	The Ultimates vol. 4 #8 (January 2025)		
Star-Lord	The Ultimates vol. 4 #8 (January 2025)	An older man and member of the Guardians of the Galaxy who is also the Master of the Solar System.	
Cosmo Starstalker	The Ultimates vol. 4 #8 (January 2025)	A telepathic dog and member of the Guardians of the Galaxy who sports a prosthetic leg.	
Martinex T'Naga	The Ultimates vol. 4 #8 (January 2025)	He shattered in front of the Guardians of the Galaxy after his teammates died in the temporal crisis caused by "Unmaker".	
Yondu Udonta	The Ultimates vol. 4 #8 (January 2025)	He died in the temporal crisis caused by "Unmaker".	
Ultimate Nullifier	The Ultimates vol. 4 #8 (January 2025)	A member of the Guardians of the Galaxy. He once shot Mephisto in the heart with an O-Bullet.	
Luke Cage	The Ultimates vol. 4 #9 (February 2025)	A man who was incarcerated for no clear reasons since his adolescence under the Maker's orders and gained powers due to an Origin-Machine sent by Stark. He readily becomes a covert ally to the Ultimates while not formally joining the team on missions. Instead, Luke told Stark that he will not be free until everybody is free. Luke then worked inside the North American Union's intricate prison system to create an underground insurgency movement, meeting Danny Rand in the process.	
Danny Rand	The Ultimates vol. 4 #9 (February 2025)	An inmate who befriends Luke Cage.	
Attuma	The Ultimates vol. 4 #10 (March 2025)		
Bucky Barnes Grand Skull	The Ultimates vol. 4 #10 (March 2025)	The leader of the Red Skulls and the fifth to wear the title after the last four died in unspecified means. His identity is unknown. After a skirmish with the Ultimates, Steve Rogers and Jim Hammond deduce he is their former ally Bucky Barnes.	
Namor	The Ultimates vol. 4 #10 (March 2025)		
John Walker	The Ultimates vol. 4 #10 (March 2025)	A member of the Red Skulls. Though he was enhanced by Stark's Origin-Machine, Walker was defeated by Human Torch.	
Fandral	The Ultimates vol. 4 #11 (April 2025)		
Hela	The Ultimates vol. 4 #11 (April 2025)		
Surtur	The Ultimates vol. 4 #11 (April 2025)		
#1983	The Ultimates vol. 4 #14 (July 2025)	The Scientist Supreme of Advanced Idea Mechanics (A.I.M.).	
Rex Bonhurst	The Ultimates vol. 4 #14 (July 2025)		
Emma Frost	The Ultimates vol. 4 #14 (July 2025)	The headmistress of the Frost School for Wayward Youngsters who serves as the White Queen in the Hellfire Club.	
Justine Hammer	The Ultimates vol. 4 #14 (July 2025)		
Oubliette Midas Exterminatrix	The Ultimates vol. 4 #14 (July 2025)		
Pietro Quicksilver	The Ultimates vol. 4 #14 (July 2025)		
Wanda Scarlet Witch	The Ultimates vol. 4 #14 (July 2025)		
Nicodemus West	The Ultimates vol. 4 #14 (July 2025)		
Shen Qi Iron Fist	The Ultimates vol. 4 #15 (August 2025)		
Wren Montgomery	The Ultimates vol. 4 #16 (September 2025)	A teenage Ultimate who joins from disaffection for her life and her growing radicalization following repeated detentions of people she knew by H.A.N.D. Montgomery is greivously injured during a H.A.N.D. crackdown before joining the main movement as a fighter; she is finally seen as an elected representative for the liberated North American Union during constitutional discussions.	
Jennifer Walters	The Ultimates vol. 4 #16 (September 2025)		
Fantastic Force	The Ultimates vol. 4 #17 (October 2025)		
Nameless	The Ultimates vol. 4 #18 (November 2025)		
Penance	The Ultimates vol. 4 #18 (November 2025)		
Wingspan	The Ultimates vol. 4 #18 (November 2025)		
Doop	The Ultimates vol. 4 #20 (January 2026)		
Irving Forbush Forbush Man	The Ultimates vol. 4 #20 (January 2026)		
Gatecrasher	The Ultimates vol. 4 #20 (January 2026)		
Doreen Green Squirrel Girl	The Ultimates vol. 4 #20 (January 2026)		
Hit-Monkey	The Ultimates vol. 4 #20 (January 2026)		
Orb	The Ultimates vol. 4 #20 (January 2026)		
James Rhodes Anti-War Machine	The Ultimates vol. 4 #20 (January 2026)		
Sam Guthrie Ballistic	The Ultimates vol. 4 #21 (February 2026)		
Marvel Boy	The Ultimates vol. 4 #21 (February 2026)		
Proctor	The Ultimates vol. 4 #21 (February 2026)		
Singularity	The Ultimates vol. 4 #21 (February 2026)		
Taskmasters	The Ultimates vol. 4 #21 (February 2026)		
Thora	The Ultimates vol. 4 #21 (February 2026)		
Sarah Rogers	The Ultimates vol. 4 #22 (March 2026)		
Johann Shmidt Red Skull	The Ultimates vol. 4 #22 (March 2026)		
Destroyer	The Ultimates vol. 4 #23 (April 2026)		
Mangog	The Ultimates vol. 4 #23 (April 2026)		

== Introduced in Ultimate Wolverine ==
Character	First appearance	Notes	References
Raven Darkhölme Mystique	Ultimate Wolverine #1 (January 2025)	A shapeshifting member of the Opposition. She is killed by a brainwashed Wolverine.	
Kurt Wagner Nightcrawler	Ultimate Wolverine #1 (January 2025)	A teleporting member of the Opposition. He is killed by a brainwashed Wolverine.	
Truett Hudson	Ultimate Wolverine #2 (February 2025)		
Remy LeBeau Gambit	Ultimate Wolverine #3 (March 2025)	A kinetic-charging member of the Opposition who was responsible for the Mikhail Massacre. Killed by the Cerebomb.	
Kitty Pryde	Ultimate Wolverine #3 (March 2025)	An intangible member of the Opposition. Killed by the Cerebomb.	
Natasha Romanova / Chyornaya Vdova Widow	Ultimate Wolverine #3 (March 2025)	A human member of the Opposition. Killed by the Cerebomb.	
Jean Grey Phoenix	Ultimate Wolverine #4 (Aprill 2025)	A telepathic mutant referred to as the "Phoenix specimen". She is kept in the "Cerebellum" beneath the Kremlin where Directorate X uses her to brainwash Logan. Though Jean is fed, her muscles are atrophied. After being freed by Wolverine, Jean helped him to kill Colossus by melting him before they are evacuated by The One who was possessing a Sentinel.	
Victor Creed Sabretooth	Ultimate Wolverine #5 (May 2025)	A member of the Opposition with claws and fangs who secretly operates as a bar owner of a bar that is a front for the mutant refugee smuggling operation.	
Leech	Ultimate Wolverine #5 (May 2025)	A mutant refugee who joins the Opposition.	
Artie Maddicks	Ultimate Wolverine #5 (May 2025)	A mutant refugee who joins the Opposition.	
Abigail Brand	Ultimate Wolverine #6 (June 2025)	A female mutant/alien member of the Opposition. Killed by the Angel Specimen.	
David Haller Legion / The One	Ultimate Wolverine #6 (June 2025)	A mutant who has dissociative identity disorder and become an important member of the Opposition. He freed Logan from the Rasputin family's brainwashing. The One later takes control of a Sentinel and becomes Sentinel One.	
Hank McCoy Beast	Ultimate Wolverine #6 (June 2025)	An animalistic member of the Opposition and residential scientist. Killed by the Angel Specimen.	
Mikhail Rasputin Archangel	Ultimate Wolverine #6 (June 2025)	A member of the Rasputin family who secretly helped the Opposition. After Gambit faked killing him, Mikhail fully defected to the Opposition. Killed by the Cerebomb.	
Alexei Shostakov Guardian	Ultimate Wolverine #6 (June 2025)	A human member of the Opposition. Killed by the Cerebomb.	
Warren Worthington III Angel	Ultimate Wolverine #8 (August 2025)	A metal-winged prisoner of the Eurasian Republic. After killing Abigail Brand and Beast in a ramble, he was subdued by the Opposition. The One managed to get his mind back to normal. Killed by the Cerebomb.	
Daniel Forge	Ultimate Wolverine #9 (September 2025)	A member of the Opposition's F.O.R.G.E. group.	
X-S Unit One	Ultimate Wolverine #9 (September 2025)	An X-S Unit (mutants being spliced with Sentinel technologies) whose torso sports the head of Scott Summers. He is killed by Wolverine.	
Bobby Drake Iceman	Ultimate Wolverine #10 (October 2025)	A cryokinetic member of the Opposition. Killed by the Cerebomb.	
Sarah Marrow	Ultimate Wolverine #10 (October 2025)	A spike-emitting member of the Opposition with bony protrusions. Killed by the Cerebomb.	
Dmitri Bukharin Crimson Dynamo	Ultimate Wolverine #13 (January 2026)	Dimitri Bukharin was brainwashed by Directorate X to serve them as Crimson Dynamo. Wolverine later finds that Ursa Major has killed Crimson Dynamo and partially eaten his body.	
Lady Deathstrike	Ultimate Wolverine #14 (February 2026)		

== Introduced in other Ultimate Universe comics ==
Character	First appearance	Notes	References
Hisako Ichiki Armor / Armor Girl	Ultimate Universe (November 2023)	Hisako Ichiki is a 16-year-old student who discovers the ability to form an armor made of psionic energy around herself. After a friend's suicide, she becomes entangled in a mystery relating to the Shadow King and a fringe cult of mutants called the Children of the Atom.	
Mei Igarashi Maystorm	Ultimate Universe (November 2023)	Mei Igarashi is a young student who idolizes Storm and later discovers weather-based powers, becoming Hisako's best friend and later forming the Secret Society X-Men alongside her and a few friends. She eventually takes on the codename "Maystorm".	
Blackagar Boltagon Black Bolt	Free Comic Book Day 2024: Ultimate Universe/Spider-Man (May 2024)		
Jim Hammond Human Torch / Vision	Free Comic Book Day 2024: Ultimate Universe/Spider-Man (May 2024)	An android who fought alongside Captain America and the Invaders in WWII, during which he killed Adolf Hitler. He was kept in a Damage Control facility before being rescued by the Ultimates and joining the team after Iron Lad repairs his body.	
Ka-Zar	Free Comic Book Day 2024: Ultimate Universe/Spider-Man (May 2024)		
Zabu	Free Comic Book Day 2024: Ultimate Universe/Spider-Man (May 2024)		
3-D Man	Ultimate Universe: One Year In (December 2024)		
Aarkus Vision	Ultimate Universe: One Year In (December 2024)		
Roberto da Costa	Ultimate Universe: One Year In (December 2024)		
Devil Dinosaur	Ultimate Universe: One Year In (December 2024)		
Dum Dum Dugan	Ultimate Universe: One Year In (December 2024)		
Nick Fury	Ultimate Universe: One Year In (December 2024)	The director of H.A.N.D who works for the Maker's Council during the Maker's absence. He is revealed to be a series of Life Model Decoys, each of whom developed a consciousness and tried to take Maker's Council down, only to be destroyed. One recent Nick Fury LMD tried to self-destruct the Beast Stratocarrier with Maker's Council on it and was killed by Emmanuel da Costa. Another one was to be activated by da Costa and Henri Duggary on Hulk's orders. The entire stock of LMDs is presumably destroyed when the Vision restores their memories, instantly traumatizing them into mass suicide.	
Howard the Duck	Ultimate Universe: One Year In (December 2024)		
Krahllak	Ultimate Universe: One Year In (December 2024)		
Lockjaw	Ultimate Universe: One Year In (December 2024)		
Logan Winter Soldier / Wolverine	Ultimate Universe: One Year In (December 2024)	A mutant called Logan was brainwashed and controlled after being captured near-death by Eurasian forces, being subjected to the Winter Soldier Program and becoming the Rasputin family's lead assassin against insurgent groups such as the Opposition. He gradually starts to unravel the truth behind his past after some of his memories were unlocked. Wolverine is freed from the Rasputin family when "The One" enters his mind.	
Mantis	Ultimate Universe: One Year In (December 2024)		
Omega the Unknown	Ultimate Universe: One Year In (December 2024)		
Alex Power	Ultimate Universe: One Year In (December 2024)		
Jack Power	Ultimate Universe: One Year In (December 2024)		
Julie Power	Ultimate Universe: One Year In (December 2024)		
Katie Power	Ultimate Universe: One Year In (December 2024)		
Alonya Prostovich	Ultimate Universe: One Year In (December 2024)	Dr. Alonya Prostovich is the head of Directorate X. After Wolverine intimidates her into letting the Phoenix Specimen down, Prostovich is killed by Magik.	
Mikhail Ursus Ursa Major	Ultimate Universe: One Year In (December 2024)	A mutant who can turn into a humanoid bear. He was brainwashed by Alongya Prostovich and used to hunt down the Opposition. Wolverine encounters Ursa Major in the sewers and kills him after realizing the extent of his brainwashing.	
Spot	Ultimate Spider-Man: Incursion #1 (June 2025)		
Clarice Ferguson Blink	Ultimate Spider-Man: Incursion #4 (September 2025)		
Longshot	Ultimate Spider-Man: Incursion #4 (September 2025)		
Clint Barton Ronin	Ultimate Hawkeye (September 2025)		
Ulysses Klaue	Ultimate Hawkeye (September 2025)		
Belasco	Ultimate Spider-Man: Incursion #5 (October 2025)		
Daredevil	Ultimate Universe: Two Years In (December 2025)	A Beyonder who operates as Daredevil and is a member of the Guardians of the Galaxy. He also possessed the Cosmic Hyper-Cube.	
D'arragh the Oldstrong	Ultimate Universe: Two Years In (December 2025)	A member of the Guardians of the Galaxy.	
Herald	Ultimate Universe: Two Years In (December 2025)	A member of the Guardians of the Galaxy. He is a time-displaced version of Thing from the 61st century and used to be a Herald of Galactus.	
Kid Korvac	Ultimate Universe: Two Years In (December 2025)	A member of the Guardians of the Galaxy.	
Madrox	Ultimate Universe: Two Years In (December 2025)	A colony of micro-organisms and member of the Guardians of the Galaxy.	
MODOS	Ultimate Universe: Two Years In (December 2025)	MODOS (short for Mental Organism Designed Only for Sorcery) is a member of the Guardians of the Galaxy.	
Technarch	Ultimate Universe: Two Years In (December 2025)	This unnamed female Technarch is a member of the Guardians of the Galaxy.	
Ultron-82 / U-82 Uatu	Ultimate Universe: Two Years In (December 2025)	An Ultron who is a member of the Guardians of the Galaxy. He lingered throughout time under "don't interfere" mode until the year 4632. Ultron-82/Uatu reveals to his teammates that the Maker's history would have never destroyed their time, and his brutality was a part of their history. His testimony helps them push on, changing their motto to "Save What You Can".	
Death's Head 22	Ultimate Endgame #1 (December 2025)		
Deathloks	Ultimate Endgame #1 (December 2025)		
Makkari	Ultimate Endgame #1 (December 2025)		
Phastos	Ultimate Endgame #1 (December 2025)		
Sersi	Ultimate Endgame #1 (December 2025)		
Zuras	Ultimate Endgame #1 (December 2025)		
Machine Men	Ultimate Endgame #2 (February 2026)		
Carnage	Ultimate Endgame #3 (March 2026)		
Anthony Davis Ringer	Ultimate Universe: Finale (June 2026)		
Victor von Doom Doctor Doom	Ultimate Universe: Finale (June 2026)	Assumed to have been on the run since Latveria was occupied by the Maker, Doom is seen only procuring a remnant of the former while he is being exterminated by Ultimates.	

== Mentioned-only characters ==
Character	First mention	Notes	References
Robert Grayson	Ultimate Invasion #2 (July 2023)		
Jack Monroe	Ultimate Invasion #2 (July 2023)		
Stephen Strange	Ultimate Invasion #2 (July 2023)		
Mephisto	The Ultimates vol. 4 #8 (January 2025)		
Phineas Horton	The Ultimates vol. 4 #10 (March 2025)		
Jericho Drumm	Ultimate Spider-Man vol. 3 #16 (April 2025)		
Charles Xavier	Ultimate Wolverine #4 (April 2025)	He was mentioned to have died at some point. While his body was kept under cryogenic stasis after his death, Xavier's brain was removed and used to make the Cerebomb, which took out most of the Opposition.	
Churnn Nova Prime	Ultimate Universe: Two Years In (December 2025)	A Nova Prime who was displaced on Moord in 13,000,000, where he was long dead before the Guardians of the Galaxy arrived.	
