= Deniz Camp =

Filipino-American comic book writer

- Born: Deniz Camp; Philippines
- Area: Writer
- Notable works: The Ultimates; Absolute Martian Manhunter; Assorted Crisis Events

Deniz Camp is a Filipino-American comics writer who has written for independent comics, Marvel Comics, and DC Comics. His most notable works are The Ultimates, Absolute Martian Manhunter and Assorted Crisis Events.

Camp received five Eisner Award nominations in 2025, the most of any creator. This led to Popverse stating that "Camp has established himself as a vibrant new voice in American comics today thanks to his ability to merge high-concept genre storytelling with slippery, inventive prose."

== Early life ==
Deniz Camp was born in the Philippines, and raised in the American Midwest. His father is Turkish and his mother is Filipina. He studied cell molecular biology and went to medical school.

== Career ==
The first professionally published comics writing Camp did was for Millarworld Annual 2016. His first long-form comic book, Maxwell's Demons, appeared from Vault Comics in 2018. It was about a child super genius, Maxwell Maas, and the alternate worlds he visited through his childhood bedroom door.

In 2022, his 20th Century Men, with artist Stipan Morian and letterer Aditya Bidikar through Image Comics. It earned critical praise and went on to be on several lists of the best comics of 2023. It is "an alternate-history tale full of Avengers-style super-soldiers, genetic experiments, and patriotic figureheads in a battle for the soul of Afghanistan." In addition, in 2022, he published Agent of W.O.R.L.D.E., a four-part pulp science fiction book, through Scout Comics with artist Filya Bratukhin, colorist Jason Wordie, and letterer Hassan Otsmane-Elhaou, and then Bloodshot Unleashed through Valiant Comics with artist Jon Davis-Hunt.

He got his first job writing for Marvel Comics in 2023 on the four-issue "Fall of X" mini-series Children of the Vault. According to Camp, "Marvel operates on a much bigger scale. It's a universe where cosmic gods and Lovecraftian monsters are commonplace, which means I get to exercise my imagination in a different way; inventing advanced cultures and super technology, resurrecting past continuity in new ways, and imagining big action scenes that put superpowers to new and interesting use."

The following year, 2024, he was announced as the writer The Ultimates, part of Marvel's new Ultimate Universe, with artist Juan Frigeri. Per Camp, "Our Ultimates is absolutely in conversation with the original Ultimates. In some ways it's a response to it, in others an inversion of it. [...] Where that Ultimates was channeling post-9/11 paranoia, this one is addressed to that nagging sense that everything's gone wrong somehow, that things were supposed to be better than this. In that way the two Ultimates will feel very different, but I think (hope) ours is true to the spirit and the ambition of the original." As part of the book, Camp introduced a new version of Hawkeye, Charli Ramsey, who was Indigenous American (specifically Oglala Lakota), as well as two-spirit and non-binary. Camp went on to write the one-shot Ultimate Universe: One Year In.

In October 2024, it was confirmed that he would be the writer for Absolute Martian Manhunter, a part of DC's Absolute Universe, with artist Javier Rodriguez. It was announced as a six-issue limited series but was extended to twelve issues after its initial success.

Staying at DC but working on the relaunch of DC Vertigo, it was announced at New York Comic Con 2025 that he would write Bleeding Hearts as part of a new line of series, with Stipan Morian as artist, as well as a series for DC's Next Level initiative, both in 2026.

In December 2024, it was announced that he would be writing a new series for Image Comics, Assorted Crisis Events, with artist Eric Zawadzki. It is an anthology series involving the collapse of time as it happens to everyday people.

== Personal life ==
According to his Image Comics biography, Camp lives in Brooklyn with his wife and several chickens.

== Bibliography ==
=== Marvel Comics ===
- Children of the Vault (illustrated by Luca Maresca, 4-issue mini-series, August–November 2023, trade paperback, 2024, ISBN 978-1302952464)
- Ultimate Universe:
  - The Ultimates (vol. 4) #1–24 (illustrated by Juan Frigeri, ongoing series, June 2024 – April 2026), collected as:
    - The Ultimates, Volume 1: Fix the World (trade paperback, February 2025, ISBN 978-1302957513), includes:
      - The Ultimates (vol. 4) #1–6
      - Free Comic Book Day 2024: Ultimate Universe/Spider-Man #1 (illustrated by Juan Frigeri, one-shot, May 2024)
    - The Ultimates, Volume 2: All Power to the People (trade paperback, September 2025, ISBN 978-1302958183), includes:
      - The Ultimates (vol. 4) #7–12
      - Ultimate Universe: One Year In #1 (illustrated by Jonas Scharf, one-shot, December 2024)
    - The Ultimates, Volume 3: Rescue Mission (trade paperback, March 2026, ISBN 978-1302958190), includes:
      - The Ultimates (vol. 4) #13–18
      - Ultimate Hawkeye #1 (co-written with Taboo and B Earl, one-shot, September 2025)
    - The Ultimates, Volume 4: Ultimate Uprising (trade paperback, August 2026, ISBN 978-1302536428), includes
      - The Ultimates (vol. 4) #19–24
      - Ultimate Universe: Two Years In #1 (co-written with Alex Paknadel, one-shot, December 2025)
  - Ultimate Spider-Man: Incursion (co-written with Cody Ziglar and illustrated by Jonas Scharf, trade paperback, February 2026, ISBN 978-1302964818), includes:
    - Ultimate Spider-Man: Incursion (5-issue limited series, June–October 2025)
    - "Ultimate Spider-Man: Incursion Prelude" (in Free Comic Book Day 2025: Ultimate Universe/Amazing Spider-Man #1, one-shot, May 2025)
  - Ultimate Endgame (illustrated by Jonas Scharf, 5-issue limited series, December 2025 – June 2026, trade paperback, September 2026, ISBN 978-1302967307)
  - "Ultimates" (illustrated by Juan Frigeri, in Ultimate Universe Finale #1, one-shot, April 2026)

=== DC Comics ===
- "Dr. Quinzel's Couples Counseling" (illustrated by Fábio Veras, short story, in Harley Quinn: Black + White + Redder #6, December 2023, trade paperback, July 2024, ISBN 978-1779526045)

==== Absolute Universe ====
- Absolute Martian Manhunter (illustrated by Javier Rodríguez, 12-issue limited series, March 2025 – June 2026), collected as:
  - Volume 1: Martian Vision (#1–6, November 2025, hardcover, ISBN 978-1799505204, trade paperback, ISBN 978-1799505211)
  - Volume 2: The Agency (#7–12, August 2026, hardcover, ISBN 978-1799510871, trade paperback, ISBN 978-1799510888)

==== DC Vertigo ====
- Bleeding Hearts #1− (illustrated by Stipan Morian, ongoing series, February 2026 – present), collected as:
  - Volume 1 (#1–6, trade paperback, October 2026, ISBN 978-1799505563)

=== Other companies ===
==== Image Comics ====
- "Duke McQueen's Greatest Adventure" (illustrated by Pracheta Banerjee, short story, in Millarworld Annual 2016 #1, July 2016)
- 20th Century Men (illustrated by Stipan Morian, 6-issue limited series, August 2022 – February 2023, trade paperback, May 2023, ISBN 978-1534324541)
- "Real Page Turner" (illustrated by Martin Morazzo, short story, in Ice Cream Man #43, January 2025, trade paperback, Volume 11: Horror, Horror, September 2025, ISBN 978-1534331167)
- Assorted Crisis Events #1– (illustrated by Eric Zawadzki, ongoing series, March 2025 – present), collected as:
  - Volume 1 (#1–5, trade paperback, September 2025, ISBN 978-1534333963)
  - Volume 2 (#6–9, trade paperback, August 2026, ISBN 978-1534330948)

==== Scout Comics ====
- Agent of W.O.R.L.D.E. (illustrated by Filya Bratukhin, 4-issue mini-series, June 2022 – March 2023)

==== Valiant Entertainment ====
- "Instead" (illustrated by Jon Davis-Hunt, short story, in Free Comic Book Day: The Year of Valiant #1, May 2022)
- Bloodshot Unleashed (illustrated by Jon Davis-Hunt, 4-issue mini-series, September–December 2022)
- Bloodshot Unleashed: Reloaded #1 (illustrated by Al Barrionuevo, one-shot, March 2024)

==== Vault Comics ====
- Maxwell's Demons (illustrated by Vittorio Astone, 4-issue mini-series, November 2017 – April 2019, trade paperback, June 2019 ISBN 978-1939424327)

==== Other ====
- "Mene, Mene, Tekel, Upharsin" (illustrated by Artyom Topilin, short story, in Ice Cream Man: Quarantine Comix − Guest Series #2, webcomic, 2020, reprinted in Ice Cream Man Presents: Quarantine Comix Special, one-shot, Image Comics, September 2020)
- Three Worlds / Three Moons: Heir Medicine #1–2 (2024)

== Awards ==
- 2021:
  - Nominated for "Best Single Issue" Ringo Award for "Mene, Mene, Tekel, Upharsin" in Ice Cream Man Presents: Quarantine Comix Special
- 2026:
  - Eisner Awards:
    - Nominated (pending) for "Best Writer" Eisner Award, for Absolute Martian Manhunter, Assorted Crisis Events and The Ultimates
    - Nominated (pending) for "Best Limited Series" Eisner Award, for Absolute Martian Manhunter
    - Nominated (pending) for "Best New Series" Eisner Award, for Assorted Crisis Events
    - Nominated (pending) for "Best One-Shot/Single Issue" Eisner Award, for Absolute Martian Manhunter #1
    - Nominated (pending) for "Best One-Shot/Single Issue" Eisner Award, for Assorted Crisis Events #4
  - Astra Book Awards:
    - Nominated for "Best Comic Book" Astra Book Award, for Absolute Martian Manhunter #1
    - Nominated for "Best Comic Book" Astra Book Award, for Ultimate Endgame #1
  - Broken Frontier Awards:
    - Won "Best New Periodical Series" Broken Frontier Award, for Assorted Crisis Events
    - Nominated for "Best Writer" Broken Frontier Award, for Assorted Crisis Events and Absolute Martian Manhunter
    - Nominated for "Best New Periodical Series" Broken Frontier Award, for Absolute Martian Manhunter
