= Ultimate Endgame =

2026 American comic book series

Publication information
- Publisher: Marvel Comics
- Format: Limited series
- Genre: Superhero
- Publication date: January – June 2026
- No. of issues: 5
- Main character(s): Ultimates; Spider-Man; Maker

Creative team
- Written by: Deniz Camp
- Pencillers: Terry Dodson; Jonas Scharf
- Inkers: Rachel Dodson; Jonas Scharf
- Letterer: VC's Cory Petit
- Colorists: Federico Blee; Edgar Delgado
- Editor(s): Wil Moss; Michelle Marchese

Ultimate Endgame is a five-issue American comic book limited series written by Deniz Camp, drawn by Terry Dodson and Jonas Scharf, and colored by Federico Blee and Edgar Delgado. The first issue was published by Marvel Comics on December 31, 2025. Set in the Ultimate Universe, the series follows the heroes of Earth-6160 rallying together to fight against the return of the Maker.

== Publication history ==
In July 2025, during San Diego Comic-Con, Marvel Comics announced the Ultimate Endgame miniseries, which depicts the return of Maker as the heroes from all five titles unite for the first time to prepare for his return. In August 2025, it was announced that Ultimate Endgame would mark the debut of the "True Believers" blind bag program.

In October 2025, during a retailer day at New York Comic Con, Marvel officially announced that the Ultimate Universe would end in April 2026 with the release of Ultimate Endgame #5. In March 2026, it was reported that the final issue had been delayed until June 10. Some concepts of this continuity are featured in the 2026 Marvel Universe crossover event Avengers: Armageddon written by Chip Zdarsky, after Miles Morales' return to Earth-616 with the Origin Boxes of Earth-6160 in the aftermath of the Ultimate Spider-Man: Incursion miniseries.

== Plot ==
The Maker has been imprisoned in the City, his headquarters, for two years. In the Savage Land, Iron Lad rebonds the picotech suit to Spider-Man after seeing that it was being used by his son Richard, stating that the suit was always meant for Spider-Man. Shortly afterward, the City opens. The Maker's Helifleet shuts down the Ultimates Network, with Iron Lad, Spider-Man, Doom, and America Chavez being sealed inside the City and cut off from the rest of the world. As the group work their way to the Central Spire, the City's nervous system, they are attacked by the Children of Tomorrow. The group is saved by an army of Deathloks, who take them to meet Immortus. Iron Lad recognizes Immortus as his father Howard Stark, but Immortus does not recognize him. When Doom asks if he knows where Maker is, Immortus states that Maker has become the City.

Iron Lad learns that Immortus extended Maker's bubble to keep the Maker in, which will only delay the inevitable. Outside the City, more than a month has passed, during which Vision and Anti-War Machine destroyed the Helifleet. Black Panther declines to join the Ultimates after facing criticism and allows Killmonger to try and kill Maker. Killmonger begins making his way to the City. Meanwhile, Immortus states to the group that they are in Limbo, which differs from the dimension of Limbo and runs on borrowed time. The Children of Tomorrow attack Immortus' forces to claim the Immortus Engine, killing Immortus. Maker confronts the group and welcomes Doom back to the City while stating that he will make him proud.

As more members of the Children of Tomorrow appear, Iron Lad, Doom, Spider-Man and America Chavez are confronted by Kang the Conqueror, who freezes time. Outside the City, the X-Men youth movement are attacked by soldiers while looking for Hisako Ichiki, but are saved by Killmonger. Kang disintegrates the Children of Tomorrow and reveals himself to be an older Tony Stark. Doom hits the Immortus Engine, causing time to resume. As Iron Lad comes to his senses and starts working on a plan, Maker takes control of Spider-Man's Picotech armor and kills Spider-Man.

Iron Lad and America Chavez continue their attack on the spire as Maker claims the Immortus Engine. Captain America is confronted by Henri Duggary. Seeing no victory in hand, Black Panther orders his army to evacuate and prepare warheads for launch. The Guardians of the Galaxy arrive, disable the warheads, and trap the soldiers in another dimension. As the dome of the City comes down, Maker emerges stating that he will unmake the universe. Meanwhile, Captain America continues his fight with Duggary, who kills him.

Wolverine and the Phoenix Specimen show up to help as Doom is hit by one of Maker's beams. Meanwhile, Scarlet Witch, Quicksilver, and Hawkeye raid Henri Duggary's lair and take down Duggary's forces. Doom throws himself into Maker, taking him out from within. Surrounded by the remains of Maker, Doom dies with his spirit embraced by Susan Storm, Human Torch, and Ben Grimm. To everyone's surprise, Spider-Man returns from the dead. Iron Lad later visits Kang the Conqueror telling him that everything is not set and anything is possible.

Wren Montgomery takes control of the Free States of the North American Union, planning to create a constitution that would make them free of Maker and Maker's Council. Decontamination efforts begin on She-Hulk's island, cleansing it of gamma radiation. In Hi no Kune, Sunfire, Viper, and Silver Samurai continue to oppose mutants, but are in turn opposed by the X-Men, who vow to help as many mutants as they can. In Latveria, the Fantastic Force collect and destroy the spilled remnants of Maker, with Victor von Doom recovering a fragment of Maker's body. America Chavez rejoins the Guardians of the Galaxy.

== Titles involved ==
- Ultimate Endgame #1–5
- Ultimate Universe Finale #1

== Reception ==
Issue #1 of Ultimate Endgame was met with mixed reviews.
