= Spot (Marvel Comics) =

The Spot
- Textless cover of Super-Villain Team-Up: MODOK's 11 #3 (November 2007). Art by Marko Djurdjević.

Publication information
- Publisher: Marvel Comics
- First appearance: As unnamed man: Peter Parker, the Spectacular Spider-Man #97 (December 1984); As Jonathon Ohnn / The Spot: Peter Parker, the Spectacular Spider-Man #98 (January 1985)
- Created by: Al Milgrom; Herb Trimpe

In-story information
- Alter ego: Johnathon Ohnn
- Species: Human mutate
- Team affiliations: The Hand; Legion of Losers; MODOK's 11; Sinister Sixteen
- Abilities: Genius level intellect; Portal creation; Immortality

The Spot is a supervillain appearing in American comic books published by Marvel Comics, most often as an adversary of Spider-Man and Daredevil. The character, created by Al Milgrom and Herb Trimpe, debuted in The Spectacular Spider-Man #97 (1984). Known for his distinctive appearance—white skin covered in black, portal-like spots—the Spot's real name is Dr. Jonathon Ohnn, a scientist who gained his powers through a botched experiment involving a portal to another dimension.

Dr. Ohnn's transformation occurred when he tried to recreate a teleportation system for Kingpin. The experiment opened a portal to a dimension of space warps, but its instability forced Ohnn to leap inside. When he returned, his body had become a living conduit for these warps, with the spots acting as portable gateways. These spots allow the Spot to teleport himself, objects, or others across short or long distances, and even through dimensions.

The character appears in a silent cameo in the animated film Spider-Man: Into the Spider-Verse (2018), and is voiced by Jason Schwartzman in its sequels Spider-Man: Across the Spider-Verse (2023) and the upcoming Spider-Man: Beyond the Spider-Verse (2027).

== Publication history ==
Dr. Johnathon Ohnn first appeared unnamed in Peter Parker, the Spectacular Spider-Man #97 (December 1984) and became the Spot in Peter Parker, the Spectacular Spider-Man #98 (January 1985). He was created by writer Al Milgrom and artist Herb Trimpe. He then appeared in Spider-Man: Across the Spider-Verse (June 2023) voiced by Jason Schwartzman.

== Creation ==
In an interview with Back Issue!, Milgrom discussed the character's creation, "As I recall, the Kingpin wanted to find out how Cloak's power, that would transport himself and Dagger away whenever he chose, worked. I thought that it would be a cool idea if there were another character that could do that in another way like access that interdimensional-ity. Then I came up with the idea for The Spot. Then I imagined a visual for him. Herb Trimpe drew the issue, but I designed the visual on the character because I drew the cover first." "One of the things I visualized was the Warner Bros. cartoons with Bugs Bunny. Elmer Fudd would be hunting him, and Bugs would go down the rabbit hole. Bugs would then move the hole like it was an extradimensional thing. That was kind of one of the inspirations for the character." "I have a sick sense of humor, so I came up with the name Johnathon Ohnn. My thinking was that he would be Johnny Ohnn the Spot" "Years after I created the Spot, I saw a rerun of an old Warner Bros. cartoon with a mad scientist who had the same schtick that he could produce black holes," "He could put them anywhere and jump through them. I don't remember seeing the cartoon when I created the character, but after watching it years later, I said, 'Oh, my God, that's the Spot.' I may have inadvertently ripped off an old Warner Bros. cartoon. I might have seen it as a kid and had it in the back of my head somewhere."

== Fictional character biography ==
Cover to The Spectacular Spider-Man #99. Art by Al Milgrom.

As a former MIT scientist working for the Kingpin, Dr. Johnathon Ohnn is assigned to reproduce the abilities of the superhero Cloak and creates a portal that transports him to another dimension. As he escapes, countless portals attach to his body. When Spider-Man and Black Cat arrive to confront Kingpin, Ohnn appears before them and warns the heroes to leave the Kingpin alone. He later loses a second battle against Spider-Man after being tricked into throwing too many of his spots as weapons, leaving him with not enough spots to defend himself with.

The Spot forms a short-lived team with Gibbon, Grizzly, and Kangaroo called the Spider-Man Revenge Squad, better known as the Legion of Losers. This team falls apart when Spider-Man captures Spot and Kangaroo. Grizzly and Gibbon leave the group, disagreeing with their teammates' more ruthless approach.

Some time later, the Spot is captured by an organization called the Gideon Trust and forced to open a portal to the Negative Zone. Gideon Trust intends to exploit the resources of the Zone for their own purposes, but is defeated by the Fantastic Four.

The Spot later helps Tombstone escape from a maximum security prison. In return, Tombstone snaps his neck. Despite this, he reappears alive months later and arranges a meeting with Slyde. Both are upset at the reports of Hydra capturing or killing lesser-known supervillains. When the Spot arrives, both he and Slyde are captured by a brainwashed Elektra. The two are recruited into Hydra's army and assault the S.H.I.E.L.D. helicarrier, but are taken out by Wolverine.

The Spot appears in MODOK's 11 as part of a team organized by the villain of the same name to steal a weapon/power-source called Hypernova. It is later revealed that Spot defected to Temugin in return for a larger paycheck. He abandons the team after they obtain the Hypernova; in response, Temugin traps him in the dimension he originally gained his powers from.

In Brand New Day, the Spot is seen in the "Bar With No Name". Later, he begins to kill members of the Russian mafia in revenge because his son was injured in a drive-by shooting and rendered comatose.

During the "Dark Reign" storyline, the Spot is one among many supervillains who join the Hood's crime syndicate. It is later revealed he is serving as a mole for Mister Negative under the promise that he will be cured once the Maggia crime families are killed.

Later, the Spot works with a man to kidnap the little girl of a mafia family during the wedding of her family and another mafia family, but the abduction is foiled by Daredevil. The Spot is captured and has his powers replicated by Coyote, a minion of an unknown figure trying to bring Daredevil down.

Boomerang and Owl hire the Spot into the Sinister Sixteen, assembled to distract the Chameleon's forces while Boomerang steals from him.

As part of the 2016 Marvel NOW!, the Spot kidnaps Jessica Jones by punching her to an unknown van. The Spot later appears as a member of the Sinister Six and accompanies the group in their mission to steal a decommissioned Helicarrier.

During the "Last Remains" arc, the Spot is used by Mayor Wilson Fisk and Norman Osborn to power Project Blank and trap Kindred. Project Blank was inspired by the Darkforce dome that was used to surround Manhattan during Hydra's takeover of the United States.

== Powers and abilities ==
Using his space warps, the Spot can instantly move himself or any part of his body from one area to another over a theoretically unlimited distance via another dimension nicknamed "Spotworld". The Spot can control and manipulate the warps to almost any degree he wishes. He can expand or shrink them to any size, or he can join together multiple spots to form one larger warp. The spots are unaffected by gravity and can be placed against a surface or left suspended in mid-air. He can also designate which spots will lead to the spot dimension from those that will instantly lead to another location in this dimension. He can create new spots, or close them entirely by retreating into his dimension and pulling the warp in behind him. By concentrating, he used to be able to revert to his human appearance. When doing this, the spots merged to form one large black void in his chest, though this was easily covered with a shirt.

Spot's preferred method of attack is to surround his opponent with numerous spots, allowing him to punch or kick them from unexpected angles across great distances. This proved effective against Spider-Man as his spider-sense was unable to detect all of the incoming attacks. The Spot can also move the spots on his body to protect himself from physical attack by positioning one in the path of a punch or kick, causing the attack to pass harmlessly through a warp. Spider-Man once defeated the Spot when his body was mostly bereft of the warps previously protecting it.

== Other versions ==
=== Amazing Spider-Man: Renew Your Vows ===
An alternate universe version of the Spot from Earth-18119 appears in Amazing Spider-Man: Renew Your Vows.

=== Marvel Zombies: Dead Days ===
An alternate universe version of the Spot from Earth-2149 appears in Marvel Zombies: Dead Days.

=== Ultimate Marvel ===
An original incarnation of the Spot from Earth-1610 appears in the Ultimate Marvel universe. This version is a former Roxxon employee named Frank who was subjected to an experiment at a Roxxon Industries complex which accidentally mutated him, transforming his entire body into white, and allowing him to manipulate black wormholes of anti-matter. Additionally, the spots on his body continuously flow around his body like a lava lamp.

=== Ultimate Universe ===
An alternate universe version of Spot from Earth-6160 appears in Ultimate Spider-Man: Incursion. This version gained his powers from a stolen Stark Box that was intended to be given to Tyrone Johnson.

== In other media ==
=== Television ===
The Spot as he appears in Spider-Man: The Animated Series (1994).

- Dr. Johnathon Ohnn / The Spot appears in a self-titled episode of Spider-Man: The Animated Series, voiced by Oliver Muirhead. This version is initially a Stark Industries scientist until he is fired after Venom and Carnage steal his technology. Afterwards, Ohnn is hired by the Kingpin and given a lab and an assistant named Sylvia Lopez, with whom he enters a relationship. After several weeks, Ohnn and Lopez finish their work, but he accidentally falls into a portal, whereupon numerous more attach to him, giving him the ability to create them at will. Adopting the alias of "The Spot", he uses his powers for personal gain and becomes a thief while lying to the Kingpin about his work. Ohnn later learns that the Kingpin is a crime lord and works with Spider-Man to stop him, but discovers that one of his portals was left open too long and will eventually engulf the Earth. Subsequently, he and Lopez sacrifice themselves to close it from the inside. Following the incident, Ohnn's portal technology is used to create the Time-Dilation Accelerator, which would later be used by villains like the Hobgoblin and Green Goblin.
  - An alternate universe version of Ohnn appears in a flashback in the episode "I Really, Really Hate Clones". This version completed his work on interdimensional portal technology for the Kingpin without becoming the Spot, though he accidentally brought the Carnage symbiote into his universe, leading to the creation of Spider-Carnage, who combined a bomb with Ohnn's Time-Dilation Accelerator in an attempt to destroy the multiverse. However, Madame Web and the Beyonder assemble a team of Spider-Men from across the multiverse to stop him.
- The Spot appears in Spider-Man (2017), voiced by Crispin Freeman.

=== Film ===
The Spot (middle) as he appears in Spider-Man: Across the Spider-Verse

Dr. Johnathon Ohnn / The Spot appears in the Spider-Verse trilogy, voiced by Jason Schwartzman.

- An unnamed scientist who Miles Morales throws a bagel at while escaping from an Alchemax facility, retroactively identified as Ohnn, makes a non-speaking cameo appearance in Spider-Man: Into the Spider-Verse (2018).
- Formally introduced in Spider-Man: Across the Spider-Verse (2023), this version is a former Alchemax scientist who was involved in the testing of the Kingpin's "super-collider" and played an indirect role in Morales becoming their world's new Spider-Man. When Morales destroyed the collider during the events of Into the Spider-Verse, Ohnn was caught in the subsequent explosion and mutated after absorbing inter-dimensional energy. Due to this, he was fired, abandoned by his loved ones and turned to crime to seek revenge on Morales, deeming him his archenemy. Enraged by Morales underestimating and ridiculing him, Ohnn constructs a smaller version of the collider to absorb its energy and strengthen himself after learning he can access other dimensions. He then travels the multiverse to absorb energy from other Alchemax colliders, encountering members of Spider-Man 2099's "Spider-Society" in the process. After becoming fully empowered, Ohnn returns to his and Morales' native Earth-1610, intent on destroying it to complete his revenge.
- Ohnn will return in Spider-Man: Beyond the Spider-Verse (2027).

=== Video games ===
- The Spot appears as a playable character in Marvel Contest of Champions
- The Spot appears as a playable character in Marvel Future Fight.
