= Ultimate Spider-Man: Incursion =

Marvel Comics limited series

- Textless cover of Ultimate Spider-Man: Incursion #1.

Publication information
- Publisher: Marvel Comics
- Format: Limited series
- Genre: Superhero
- Publication date: June – October 2025
- No. of issues: 5
- Main character(s): Miles Morales; Billie Morales; Spider-Man; Ultimates; Maker's Council

Creative team
- Written by: Deniz Camp; Cody Ziglar
- Penciller: Jonas Scharf
- Inker: Jonas Scharf
- Letterer: VC's Cory Petit
- Colorist: Edgar Delgado
- Editor(s): Wil Moss; Michelle Marchese

Ultimate Spider-Man: Incursion is a 2025 five-issue comic book miniseries published by Marvel Comics and written by Deniz Camp and Cody Ziglar and illustrated by Jonas Scharf. A crossover between Miles Morales: Spider-Man and Ultimate Spider-Man set on Earth-6160, it tells the story of Miles Morales who travels to Earth-6160 after his little sister Billie is transported there and encounters this reality's Spider-Men and other inhabitants.

== Publication history ==
The Free Comic Book Day 2025 one-shot issue for May 3, 2025 featured a prologue for the limited series Ultimate Spider-Man: Incursion, which first issue will be published on June 4, 2025. The story features Miles Morales trying to save his sister Billie after she was accidentally transported from Earth-616 to Earth-6160.

== Plot ==
While swinging through Brooklyn, Miles Morales recalls his encounter with Maker who gave him a card to join him in his new universe which Miles discarded. (Note: As seen in Ultimate Invasion #1) His baby sister Billie finds the card and is teleported away with Miles in pursuit. They arrive in Manhattan on Earth-6160 where their arrival is detected by Spider-Man and his son Richard Parker as Billie lands in Wakanda. They also encounter Spot who got his powers from a Stark Box. Miles Morales shows up and assists in the fight against Spot. Miles explains where he comes from as Spider-Man learns of his Earth-616 counterpart and that he is looking for his baby sister. As both Spider-Men assist Miles in looking for Billie, Spot breaks free and catches up to them before being knocked out by Spot again. Miles arrival has not gone unnoticed by Maker's Council and H.A.N.D. The members of Maker's council have differing beliefs on the nature of Miles' arrival, but all seek the teleportation energy. After Spider-Man and Richard leave, Miles continues his search until he runs into Ultimates members Giant-Man and Wasp.

Billie wanders into a Wakandan area towards the green orb, only to be intercepted by Black Panther, Shuri, Killmonger, and Storm. They find that Billie has energies that are associated with Maker and assume that it will unlock new beginnings. Meanwhile in Rwanda, Miles is briefed by Giant-Man and Wasp about Iron Lad and Doom's theories about Billie bringing about the end of the world. They are then attacked at the border by the Dora Milaje, who state that they have been listed as terrorists. Black Panther, Killmonger, and Storm confront Miles, Giant-Man, and Wasp. H.A.N.D. Agent 18929-93 has posed as a Wakandan servant as he grabs Billie and plans to return to the Beast with her. Both sides go to look for Billie. Before Agent 18929-93 can reach the rendezvous, he is ambushed by Silver Samurai, who impales him and steals Billie for Sunfire.

Two months have passed since Miles arrived in Earth-6160. He stumbles upon Nico Minoru and Maystorm, who mistake him for a demon. While watching over Billie, Silver Samurai is contacted by Emmanuel da Costa, who wants to make a deal with Sunfire to have Billie transferred to his custody. Miles, Nico, and Maystorm teleport into the room where Billie is in. Miles and Maystorm defeat Silver Samurai and Viper, but Magik appears and makes off with Billie.

In the Eurasian Republic, Miles and Maystorm are trudging through the snow when they come across a cabin. Using Nico Minoru's staff, Maystorm makes the cabin hospitable. The next day, Magik fights a rogue faction of Henri Duggary's Black Knights. Magik is then ambushed by Miles Morales and Maystorm as they struggle to fight her. They managed to take down Magik. Meanwhile, the technicians guarding Billie are confronted by Emmanuel da Costa, who kills them and takes Billie to the City.

After following Magik through the portal, Miles tries to get to Billie, only to be attacked by Emmanuel da Costa. As Miles and Magik are forced into a truce, da Costa uses his powers to see into their fears with Magik confronted by Limbo's demons and Miles fearing failure. Iron Lad, Captain America, Giant-Man, Wasp, and She-Hulk arrive as Magik and da Costa manage to escape. Miles is approached by Captain America and Iron Lad, who note that da Costa has taken use of most of the superhero catalysts. The catalysts are placed in a box, which Miles takes with him as he returns to Earth-616 with Billie. (Note: The storyline involving the Origin Boxes is continued in the series Reborn: Ultimate Impact.)

== Reception ==
Issue #1 of Ultimate Spider-Man: Incursion was met with positive reviews.

According to Comicbook Roundup, the first issue received an average rating of 6.8 out of 10 based on 25 reviews. The second issue received an average rating of 6.5 out of 10 based on 13 reviews.

== Follow-up ==
The aftermath of this miniseries will lead into the Avengers: Armageddon storyline and Reborn: Ultimate Impact.
