= Johnny-on-the-spot =

Johnny-on-the-spot is a slang term for someone who is conveniently in the right place at the right time. The New York Sun published an article titled "Johnny on the Spot: A New Phrase Which Has Become Popular in New York" in 1896, bringing it more attention. The phrase was not new at the time, but the Sun article helped popularize it in the United States.

In the 1998 movie Saving Private Ryan, when Miller's troops are preparing to defend a bridge from German attack, Jewish trooper Mellish tells the inexperienced Upham to be "Johnny-on-the-spot with the ammo, or we're dead."

In the second-season finale of Better Call Saul, Charles McGill refers to his brother Jimmy as "Johnny-on-the-spot," noting his conveniently timely presence when Charles lost consciousness.

The term may also refer to:

== Film ==
- Johnny-on-the-Spot (1919), an American silent comedy
- Johnny on the Spot (1954), a British crime drama.

== Other ==
- The Johnny On The Spot, another name for a portable toilet
- "I'll Be Your Jonny On the Spot," a song by American rock band Ween on the 1997 album The Mollusk
- The phrase gained further popularity after being use by the players personal mechanic in GTA Online, who, when called, is stating "I'm Johnny-on-the-spot, I'll hook you up!" or "You calling for some wheels? It's Johnny on the spot!"
