= Ice Cream Man (comics) =

Horror anthology comic

- Cover to Ice Cream Man #1

Publication information
- Publisher: Image Comics
- Schedule: Monthly (Jan 2018 – April 2018); Irregular (July 2018 – present)
- Format: Ongoing series
- Genre: Horror; Dark comedy Anthology
- Publication date: January 2018

Creative team
- Written by: W. Maxwell Prince
- Artist: Martin Morazzo

Ice Cream Man is a semi-anthological dark comedy horror comic book series that premiered in 2018 from Image Comics. The series is written by W. Maxwell Prince with art by Martin Morazzo. The plot follows an ice cream man named Rick and his nemesis Caleb, as Rick attempts to spread misery and death wherever he goes; with Caleb doing what he can to prevent it. The series was optioned for an adaptation in 2018. Since its debut, the series has received positive reviews.

== Premise ==
The series is an anthological horror comic series of very loosely connected stories that share a common link- a seemingly normal ice cream man named Rick (who is later revealed to be actually called Riccardus), who possesses inexplicable dark powers which he uses upon unsuspecting people. Rick's role in each issue ranges from protagonist to brief cameo but appears most often as a supporting character. Rick's nemesis, Caleb; a man dressed in an all brown cowboy outfit, sporadically appears in the series trying to thwart Rick's plans.

The stories range from bleak and graphic horror to light comedy, with surrealness mixed into most stories: issues often incorporate gimmicks into their format (e.g. three stories being told simultaneously with each page containing one panel of each, an issue taking place in multiple television shows, and an issue meant to be reread backwards).

== Reception ==
Since its debut the series has received positive reviews. On the review aggregator, Comic Book Roundup, the series averaged a rating of 8.5 out of 10 based on a sample of 150 critics.

== Adaptation ==
In October 2018, it was announced an adaptation of the series was in development at Universal Cable Productions. In February 2020, it was announced the series had been picked up by mobile streaming platform Quibi. With Quibi's shutdown in December 2020, the fate of the series was mostly undetermined. However, in January 2021 W. Maxwell Prince mentioned that the series is still in production. In September 2024, it was announced Screen Gems had acquired the rights to the series with Alfred Gough and Miles Millar writing the adaptation.

== Collected editions ==
=== Trade paperbacks ===
Title	Collected material	Published date	ISBN
Volume 1: Rainbow Sprinkles	Ice Cream Man #1–4	20 June 2018	9781534310865
Volume 2: Strange Neapolitan	Ice Cream Man #5–8	12 December 2018	9781534308763
Volume 3: Hopscotch Mélange	Ice Cream Man #9–12	12 June 2019	9781534312265
Volume 4: Tiny Lives	Ice Cream Man #13–16	24 December 2019	9781534313767
Volume 5: Other Confections	Ice Cream Man #17–20	8 September 2020	9781534315976
Volume 6: Just Desserts	Ice Cream Man #21–24	29 June 2021	9781534317277
Volume 7: Certain Descents	Ice Cream Man #25–28	23 February 2022	9781534319301
Volume 8: Subjects & Objects	Ice Cream Man #29–32	26 October 2022	9781534323223
Volume 9: Heavy Narration	Ice Cream Man #33–36	20 September 2023	9781534399839
Volume 10: Imperious Wrecks	Ice Cream Man #37–40	20 November 2024	9781534397286
Volume 11: Horror, Horror	Ice Cream Man #41-44	30 September 2025	9781534331167

=== Hardcovers ===
Title	Collected material	Published date	ISBN
Ice Cream Man: Sundae Edition, Vol. 1	Ice Cream Man #1–12	3 August 2022	9781534321823
Ice Cream Man: Sundae Edition, Vol. 2	Ice Cream Man #13–24, HAHA #6, and Ice Cream Man Quarantine Comix Special	14 November 2023	9781534398191

== Specials ==
Two specials for this series have been released as of October 2026.

Ice Cream Man Presents: Quarantine Comix Special was released on September 9, 2020. It includes multiple mini-comics from various creators which were originally released online early on during the COVID-19 pandemic.

Ice Cream Man: The Mortal Coil Shuffle was released on November 5, 2025. It consists of a deck of 55 "playing" cards which are intended to be read in order to form a sequential story. This release was originally intended to be a one-time thing, but due to popular demand is receiving a second edition on November 25th, 2026.
