= Rock Lee & His Ninja Pals =

- Also known as: Naruto SD: Rock Lee's Springtime of Youth Full Power Ninja Chronicles
- NARUTO -ナルト- SD ロック・リーの青春フルパワー忍伝; Naruto Sugoi Doryoku Rokku Rī no Seishun Furu-Pawā Ninden
- Genre: Comedy; Parody
- Created by: Masashi Kishimoto
- Based on: Rock Lee no Seishun Full-Power Ninden by Kenji Taira
- Developed by: Kento Shimoyama
- Directed by: Masahiko Murata (#1–26); Gorou Sessha (#27–51)
- Voices of: Yōichi Masukawa; Junko Takeuchi; Yukari Tamura; Kōichi Tōchika; Masashi Ebara
- Narrated by: Tōru Ōkawa
- Music by: Jun Abe; Seiji Muto
- Opening theme: "Give Lee Give Lee Rock Lee" by Animetal USA and Hironobu Kageyama (#1–26); "Love Song" by Okamoto's (#27–51)
- Ending theme: "Twinkle Twinkle" by Secret (#1–13); "Go! Go! Here We Go!" by Shiritsu Ebisu Chugaku (#14–26); "Daijoubu Bokura" by Ram Wire (#27–39); "Icha Icha Chu Chu Kyappi Kyappi Love Love Suri Suri Doki Doki" by HAPPY BIRTHDAY (#40–51)
- Country of origin: Japan
- Original language: Japanese
- No. of episodes: 51

Production
- Producers: Naoji Hōnokidani; Makoto Shiraishi (#1–26); Makoto Hijikata (#27–51)
- Cinematography: Kazumi Yokoo; Ryō Iijima (#4–5)
- Editors: Seiji Morita; Yūichi Ōno; Kazuhiro Nagao; Keita Kawamura
- Running time: 23 minutes
- Production companies: Shueisha; TV Tokyo; Pierrot

Original release
- Network: TV Tokyo
- Release: April 3, 2012 – March 26, 2013

Related
- Naruto; Naruto: Shippuden

Rock Lee & His Ninja Pals, known in Japan as Naruto SD: Rock Lee's Springtime of Youth Full Power Ninja Chronicles, (Note: Japanese: NARUTO -ナルト- SD ロック・リーの青春フルパワー忍伝, Hepburn: Naruto Sugoi Doryoku Rokku Rī no Seishun Furu-Pawā Ninden) is a Japanese anime television series based on the Naruto spin-off manga Rock Lee no Seishun Full-Power Ninden by Kenji Taira. The series is a spin-off of Naruto (2002–07) and Naruto: Shippuden (2007–17), and it acknowledges their continuity although it does not follow the main story. It was produced by Pierrot, Shueisha, and TV Tokyo, with Masahiko Murata and Gorou Sessha serving as series directors.

The series chronicles the daily life and training of the titular character Rock Lee, a ninja of Konoha who is proficient at taijutsu, but has no skill in ninjutsu, kenjutsu, or genjutsu. In addition to Lee, other characters from throughout the Naruto anime also appear in recurring roles.

The series premiered on TV Tokyo in Japan on April 3, 2012, and concluded on March 26, 2013, with 51 episodes. Crunchyroll simulcast the series as it aired online and has each episode available for streaming.

== Premise ==
Rock Lee is an energetic ninja from the village of Konoha who cannot use ninjutsu or genjutsu, so he tries to become a "splendid ninja" by relying entirely on intense physical training of his taijutsu, and sheer willpower. He is joined by his strict yet goofy mentor Might Guy, his brooding teammate Neji Hyuga, and his weapons expert teammate Tenten. In contrast to the more serious, story-driven tone of Naruto: Shippuden (which is a parallel midquel of the series), the spin-off series focuses on absurd and fast-paced gags, with chibi-style character designs, day-to-day mishaps, and parodies of the main story. Each episode of Rock Lee & His Ninja Pals consists of two segments featuring comical scenes and mini-skits to emphasize the characters' goals and thought processes.

== Voice cast and characters ==
Character	Japanese	English (Viz Media)
Rock Lee	Yōichi Masukawa	Brian Donovan
Naruto Uzumaki	Junko Takeuchi	Maile Flanagan
Tenten	Yukari Tamura	Danielle Judovits
Neji Hyuga	Koichi Tochika	Steve Staley
Might Guy	Masashi Ebara	Skip Stellrecht
Sakura Haruno	Chie Nakamura	Kate Higgins
Kakashi Hatake	Kazuhiko Inoue	Dave Wittenberg
Shikamaru Nara	Showtaro Morikubo	Tom Gibis
Hinata Hyuga	Nana Mizuki	Stephanie Sheh
Ino Yamanaka	Ryoka Yuzuki	Colleen O'Shaughnessey
Choji Akimichi	Kentarō Itō	Robbie Rist
Kiba Inuzuka	Kosuke Toriumi	Kyle Hebert
Shino Aburame	Shinji Kawada	Derek Stephen Prince
Sasuke Uchiha	Noriaki Sugiyama	Yuri Lowenthal
Gaara	Akira Ishida	Liam O'Brien
Orochimaru	Kujira	Steve Blum
Jiraiya	Hōchū Ōtsuka	David Lodge
Tsunade	Masako Katsuki	Debi Mae West
Itachi Uchiha	Hideo Ishikawa	Crispin Freeman
Tobi	Wataru Takagi	Michael Yurchak
Nagato	Junpei Morita	Vic Mignogna

== Episodes ==
Season	Episodes	Originally released	
Season	Episodes	First released	Last released
1	51	April 3, 2012	March 26, 2013

No.	Title	Original release date
1	"Rock Lee is a Ninja who can't use Ninjutsu / Rock Lee's Rival is Naruto"; Transliteration: "Rokku Rī wa ninjutsu no tsukaenai ninja desu / Rokku Rī no raibaru wa Naruto desu" (Japanese: ロック・リーは忍術の使えない忍者です / ロック・リーのライバルはナルトです)	April 3, 2012
A girl faces a group of thugs in Konohagakure. Lee uses Elimination by Dispantsification to the thug leader and accidentally the claws clutch on his butt, ends up in retreating. Lee, Neji and Tenten engage on an item retrieval mission. It involves getting a dessert called Baumkuchen, which is available at the department store in exchange of a voucher. As Lee is about to get the voucher, Naruto Uzumaki suddenly arrives. The two contest on getting the voucher first, and Naruto uses his Shadow Clone Jutsu and Sexy Jutsu. As they arrive to the department store, the owner tells them that they're late and the last Baumkuchen has gone.
2	"Love is a part of the Springtime of Youth / Love makes both sides Crazy"; Transliteration: "Koi mo mata seishun no ichi buna no desu / Ai to wa futari de oroka ni naru koto desu" (Japanese: 恋もまた青春の一部なのです / 愛とはふたりで愚かになることです)	April 10, 2012
Rock Lee has a crush on Sakura Haruno. He mounts numerous "love offenses" on his target, but Sakura manages to easily brush them off. Later, Lee goes to slip a love letter into her shoebox, in hopes of getting closer to Sakura, but things get complicated when Naruto does the same.
3	"A Competition with the Genius Ninja Neji / Tenten's Must-Win Battle"; Transliteration: "Tensai ninja Neji to shōbuna no desu / Tenten ni wa yuzurenai tatakai ga aru no desu" (Japanese: 天才忍者ネジと勝負なのです / テンテンには譲れない戦いがあるのです)	April 17, 2012
Lee's teammate Neji Hyuga is a talented ninja referred to by many as a genius.
4	"Guy-sensei didn't...do it... / Guy-sensei's Rival is Kakashi-sensei"; Transliteration: "Soredemo Gai Sensei wa yattenai…desu / Kakashi Sensei wa Gai Sensei no raibaru desu" (Japanese: それでもガイ先生はやってない…です / カカシ先生はガイ先生のライバルです)	April 24, 2012
Lee's beloved Guy Sensei is arrested for lewd behavior. Lee promises to clear his master's name. Later, Kakashi Sensei's secret move defeats Guy, and Lee decides to follow Kakashi and become as powerful as he is.
5	"I'm Going to Teach Konohamaru Kempo / I Save my Lucky Undies for Physicals"; Transliteration: "Konohamaru ni kenpō o oshieru no desu / Kenkōshinda wa shōbu pantsu de idomimasu" (Japanese: 木ノ葉丸に拳法を教えるのです / 健康診断は勝負パンツで挑みます)	May 1, 2012
Konohamaru usually practices ninjutsu with Naruto. But now he's sought out Rock Lee to learn better hand-to-hand combat skills. Later, Lee and the others are ordered to undergo a routine physical exam.
6	"The Leaf Village Sports Meet / Cavalry Battles are Part of the Thrill of Youth"; Transliteration: "Konoha no sato no dai undōkai desu/ Gibasen wa seishun no daigomina no desu" (Japanese: 木ノ葉の里の大運動会です / 騎馬戦は青春の醍醐味なのです)	May 8, 2012
The Hidden Leaf Village is holding a sports meet. Lee is called to read the Athlete's Pledge of Fair Play, but screws up in front of the entire stadium. Hoping to save face, he swears to outperform everyone at every event.
7	"Orochimaru is a B-Type Scorpio / Love Letters are the Ultimate Trap"; Transliteration: "Orochimaru wa Sasori-za B-gata desu! / Raburetā wa saidai no wanana no desu" (Japanese: 大蛇丸はさそり座B型です！ / ラブレターは最大の罠なのです)	May 15, 2012
Lee and his team are on guard duty at the front gate, but they'll have to be extra vigilant. Later, Lee is flummoxed by Guy-sensei's new "Smooth Operator Fist."
8	"Even Hokages Go Bald / Orochimaru is Persistent"; Transliteration: "Hokage datte hagerutoki wa hageruno desu! / Orochimaru wa tottemo shitsukoii otoko nano desu!" (Japanese: 火影だってハゲるときはハゲるのです / 大蛇丸はとってもしつこい男なのです)	May 22, 2012
Lee's team is pulling bodyguard duty for the Fifth Hokage Tsunade while she's off on a gambling binge. Later, Orochimaru summons Manda to swallow Tsunade, Naruto, and even Guy-sensei whole!
9	"Hinata is Neji's cousin / Hinata's weakness is Naruto."; Transliteration: "Hinata wa Neji no itokona no desu / Hinata no jakuten wa Naruto desu" (Japanese: ヒナタはネジのいとこなのです / ヒナタの弱点はナルトです)	May 29, 2012
Neji's cousin Hinata is trying to get some training in, but it's not easy with Lee constantly getting in the way. Later, Lee and several others don a familiar orange outfit – Naruto's.
10	"Teamwork is indeed a proof of youth. / The criminal is here. It's him!" Transliteration: "Chīmuwāku koso seishun no akashi desu / Han'nin wa kono naka ni iru! Desu!" (Japanese: チームワークこそ青春の証です / 犯人はこの中にいる！です!)	June 5, 2012
After seeing Shikamaru Nara and Choji Akimichi in action, Lee attempts to strengthen his friendship with Neji. On the way to take an IQ test, Lee's team discovers Guy-sensei collapsed on the ground! They'll have to push their brains to the limit to solve this mystery.
11	"A Field Trip to the Old Capital! / Girls' Rooms and Candy Boxes!"; Transliteration: "Koto to ieba, shūgakuryokōdesu! / Joshi no heya to kaite okashi-bakodesu!" (Japanese: 古都といえば、修学旅行です! / 女子の部屋と書いてお菓子箱です!)	June 12, 2012
Lee and Naruto are both dying to be on Sakura's team for a research trip to the old capital city. But when they're stuck with Neji instead, they settle for tailing her. Evening falls and Lee's group wants to slip away from the senseis to go hang out with the girls.
12	"The No-Ninjutsu Lifestyle! / I want to Share an Umbrella with Sakura!"; Transliteration: "Ninjutsu kinshi no taiken gakushūna nodesu / Sakura-san to aiaigasa o shitai nodesu" (Japanese: 忍術禁止の体験学習なのです / サクラさんと相合傘をしたいのです)	June 19, 2012
Fed up with their pupils using their ninja skills for the simplest of tasks, Guy and Kakashi set out to teach them some appreciation. Later, Lee is training in the rain without an umbrella, when he sees Sakura getting soaked as well. Naruto appears with an umbrella to save the day, and a jealous Lee has to choose between training and love, but when he chooses the latter, Tenten makes everything complicated.
13	"Student vs. Master! Rock Lee vs. Might Guy! / I will Surpass Guy Sensei!"; Transliteration: "Shiteitaiketsu! Rokku Ri vs Maito Gai desu / Gai Sensei wo Koeruno desu!" (Japanese: 師弟対決！ロック・リーvsマイト。ガイです / ガイ先生を超えるのです!)	June 26, 2012
The ninjas of the Hidden Leaf are being tested on their combat skills, and Team Guy must win a match against their sensei in order to pass. Neji and Tenten succeed using their special moves, but how will Lee stand up to Guy-sensei's Morning Peacock?
14	"I Want My Popularity Back! / Death!"; Transliteration: "Ninja ninki wo toimodo suno desu! / Desu!" (Japanese: 忍者人気を取い戻すのです！ / デス!)	July 3, 2012
Fewer children in the Hidden Leaf Village are choosing to become ninjas. Lee goes to talk to Guy-sensei about the issue, only to overhear his idol say "Ninjutsu is the most important part of being a ninja!" On his way to visit a hospitalized Guy-sensei, Lee hears Tsunade say he "doesn't have much time left."
15	"The Pool's Finally Open! / The Super Happy Orochi-Pool Park!"; Transliteration: "Dokidoki ☆ Puru hiraki desu / Wakuwaku ♥ Orochi Puru Kouen desu!" (Japanese: ドキドキ ☆ プール開きです / ワクワク ♥ おろちプール園です!)	July 10, 2012
It's summer in the Leaf Village, but the pool's empty. Lee wants to take Sakura on a date, so he, Neji and Tenten go to check out the newly-opened "Super Happy Orochi-Pool Park." And of course, lying in wait is... Orochimaru.
16	"The Warring Chef Triad / Time to Tone Down Guy-Sensei!"; Transliteration: "3tsu domoeno ryouri shiyo desu / Gai Sensei wo usukusuruno desu!" (Japanese: 3つ巴の料理シヨーです! / ガイ先生を薄くするのです!)	July 17, 2012
Lee and the gang are out camping, but it's not easy to cook in the great outdoors. When Shikamaru comes up with a plan to pit the girls against each other in a cook-off, Tenten, Sakura and Ino put their pride as women on the line and charge into battle! This year Guy-sensei is in charge of running morning exercises, but he's a lot to deal with first thing in the morning. Lee and the team set out to drum up attendance.
17	"Road to Guy! / The Amazing True Story of the Leaf Village Film Festival!"; Transliteration: "ROAD TO GUY desu! / Jitsuroku! Konoha no Sato no mousou eigasai desu!" (Japanese: ROAD TO GUY です! / じつろく！ 木ノ葉の里の妄想映画祭です!)	July 24, 2012
Lee and Tenten grab the latest issue of Jump to get the scoop on the new Naruto movie! But the moment they get it, a bright light blinds them, and when it fades, everyone's personality is totally different! The new Naruto movie is almost here, and Tsunade's worried it's lacking something to make it a must-see. Tenten overhears the Hokage and works with Lee and Neji to figure out what's missing.
18	"Boom! The Shinobi Fireworks Show! / Bang! Tenten's Acting Weird!"; Transliteration: "Doki! Ninja-darake no hanabi taikai desu! / Giku! Tenten no yōsu ga okashī desu!" (Japanese: ドキッ!忍者だらけの花火大会です! / ギクッ!テンテンの様子がオカシイです!)	July 31, 2012
The Leaf Village is holding a fireworks show, including a contest to see which ninja can make the biggest boom. Guy-sensei orders Lee to win at any cost! After the fireworks show, Tenten starts acting strange. Neji and Lee set her up for numerous punchlines, but she just doesn't seem to want to play the part this week.
19	"Summer means Seashell Styles! / Watermelon Wars!"; Transliteration: "Natsu wa yappari kai pan sutairu desu! / Suikappu wo meguru gekitō desu!" (Japanese: 夏はやっぱり貝パンスタイルです! / スイカップを巡る激闘です!)	August 7, 2012
Team Guy and Team Kakashi head to the beach. Lee wants to scope out Sakura's "amazing" new bathing suit, but Guy-sensei makes him train instead. Lee wants to have fun by splitting watermelons, but Guy-sensei turns it into a training exercise. It's a race for survival to get a crack at the perfect target!
20	"I want to be friends with Gaara! / The Rock Lee Impostor Strikes!"; Transliteration: "Gaara-kun to nakayoku narou! Desu! / Rokku rī no nisemono genru! Desu!" (Japanese: 我愛羅くんと仲良くなろう。です! / ロック・リーのニセモノ現る!です!)	August 14, 2012
Lee and the gang does a mission in the Sand Village. Thinking Lee still has something against Gaara, Tenten and the others try to bring them together. A Rock Lee impostor appears and starts ruining Lee's good name. Lee's group attempt to catch him using a cross-dressing Neji as bait, when they finally find the impostor they have a short battle!
21	"A Hot Night for a Chilling Tale / The Hokage Tears aren't for Decoration!"; Transliteration: "Negurushī yoru wa mi mo kōru kowai hanashi desu/ Hokage-sama no namida wa kazari janaino desu!" (Japanese: 寝苦しい夜は身も凍る怖い話です / 火影様の涙は飾りじゃないのです!)	August 21, 2012
It's a sweltering summer night, but Guy-sensei wants Lee and the boys to cool themselves off without air conditioning. Lee and Konohamaru set out to solve one of the "Seven Mysteries of the Leaf" – "The Tears of Mount Hokage."
22	"Always Do Your Homework at the Last Minute! / Class 3-Lee! We Are Team Guy!"; Transliteration: "Shyukudaito wa kigen zennjitsuni yaruno gakihon desu! / 3nen ri-gumi! Gai-han desu!" (Japanese: 宿題とは期限前日にやるのが基本です！ / 3ー年りーぐみ！ ガイ班です！)	August 28, 2012
Lee and Naruto seek help from their friends the day before their summer homework is due. Unfortunately for them, they also seem to have forgotten all the craziness that happened over the summer. Lee's team visits the Academy, only to find a class of lazy kids who mock Lee for working so hard.
23	"Naruto is Lee and Lee is Naruto! / I Dream of Walking with the Nine-tails!"; Transliteration: "Naruto ga Ri de Ri ga Naruto, desu! / Kyuubikun to osanposuru ga yume desu!" (Japanese: ナルトがリーでリーがナルトで、です！ / 九尾くんとお散歩するのが夢です！)	September 4, 2012
Ino catches Naruto and Lee trying to peep on Sakura while she's in the bath, but when she misfires with her Mind-Body Switch jutsu, Lee and Naruto end up swapping bodies!
24	"I'm Sai's New Agent! / Win Lady Tsunade's Heart!"; Transliteration: "Sai.wo Purodusa desu! / Tsunade-sama no Hato wo GET YOU desu!" (Japanese: サイ。をプロデュースです！ / 綱手さまのハートをGETYOUです！)	September 11, 2012
It's the Leaf Village culture festival, and Lee is convinced Sai wants to stand out more. Poor Sai... The "Mr. Leaf Village" contest is just around the corner.
25	"Gaara's First Crush! / A Gift From Orochimaru!"; Transliteration: "Gaara-kun no mune kiyunn ☆ hatsukoi deto desu / Orochimaru kara no purezento desu" (Japanese: 我愛羅くんの胸キユン☆初恋デートです / 大蛇丸からのプレゼントです)	September 18, 2012
When Lee notices the character on Gaara's forehead has changed from "Love" to "Romance," he's convinced the Kazekage's got a crush on someone and sets out to learn her identity. They assume it's a cross-dressed Neji, but in reality "Gaara" is a disguised Orochimaru who merely got the character mixed up. Lee gets a booby-trapped watch from Orochimaru that will explode if he stops training. Or if Neji cross-dresses. Or Tenten overreacts.
26	"The Green Flame, Dodge Lee! / The Yes-Man Says No!" (Japanese: 蒼い炎の逃球児・ドッジ☆リーです /ブラック企業の言いなりはコリゴリです)	September 25, 2012
Lee's convinced the upcoming dodgeball tournament is going to be a silly game for kids, until a few choice words from Guy-sensei light a fire in his soul. After a fight with Orochimaru, Kabuto sets out to prove he's better than his former boss by joining Lee's group.
27	"My First Five-Star Sushi! / Friendship, Effort, and Victory!"; Transliteration: "Mawaranaio sushi hatsutaiken desu! / Yuujyou-doryouku-shyouri wa eien no sangensoku desu!" (Japanese: まわらないお寿司初体験です！ / 友情-努力-勝利は永遠の三原則です！)	October 2, 2012
Lady Tsunade hits a lottery jackpot and promises to take Lee and the gang out for five-star sushi, but needs Kakashi and Guy's help to get out of it when she notices her ticket was off by one number. Iruka-sensei's had enough with his disobedient students, so Lee and the gang come to the Academy to put on a show.
28	"Hunting for Mastsutake Mushrooms! / Lee and Neji Part Ways!"; Transliteration: "Shokuyoku no aki! Matsutake kari ni iku no desu! / Rī to Neji, ketsubetsu no toki desu!" (Japanese: 食欲の秋！マツタケ狩りに行くのです！ / リーとネジ、決別の時です！)	October 9, 2012
Naruto, Lee and the others go out hunting for matsutake mushrooms, but there are none to be found after the abnormally hot summer. Neji's finally had enough of being forced to cross-dress for Lee's skits, and turns his back on Lee.
29	"We're Here to Welcome Gaara! / The Ultimate Autumn Diet!"; Transliteration: "Gaara-kun o settai suru nodesu! / Aki no daietto dai sakusendesu!" (Japanese: 我愛羅くんを接待するのです！ / 秋のダイエット大作戦です！)	October 16, 2012
Gaara decides to come and visit Konoha. Lee and his pals are awaiting his arrival and Lee goes a little overboard as usual to satisfy Gaara's visit there. The kunoichi of Konoha seem to be looking for ways to be thinner and they soon turn to Guy Sensei.
30	"Autumn Shinobi Safety Lessons! / Deidara's Art is Always a Blast!"; Transliteration: "Aki no ninjutsu anzen undō desu! / Senpai no geijutsu wa itsu demo bakuhatsu-chū desu!" (Japanese: 秋の忍術安全運動です！ / 先輩の芸術はいつでも爆発中です！)	October 23, 2012
With a lot of ninjas getting injured due to carelessness, Lady Tsunade sets out to teach her charges the importance of safety. Lady Tsunade puts Lee and the gang in charge of the village Halloween celebration, but Deidara and Tobi are on hand to show them what real terror is all about.
31	"Nothing Beats Mixed Bathing! / October 27th was Orochimaru's Birthday..." (Japanese: 温泉は混浴に限るのです！ / 10月27日は大蛇丸の誕生日！でした・・・)	October 30, 2012
Orochimaru realizes his birthday, October 27th, came and went without anyone noticing, and he wants Lee to suffer the same anguish.
32	"Sakura's My Nurse! / One Vote for Rock Lee!" (Japanese: サクラさんに看病してもらうのです！ / ロック・リーに清き一票を！です！)	November 6, 2012
With Tsunade taking a day off working at the Leaf Village hospital, Sakura takes her place and Naruto and Lee decide to take this chance to get closer to Sakura so they fake their way into getting sick. Many test and trials lay ahead of them into faking their sickness. Voting time is coming to a close in the Leaf Village. Many candidates are running for the most popular spot but only one can win. Lee tries to run but ends up not even being ranked. Now it's Lee's job to make himself count.
33	"Might Guy – A Story of Love and Hair / Substitute Narrator" (Japanese: マイト・ガイ 愛と髪の日々です / ナレーションに挑戦するのです！)	November 13, 2012
By being deceived by Orochimaru, Guy used a shampoo that removed the top part of his hair, making him bald. Now Lee and the gang try everything to fix his problem. At the beginning, the Narrator seems sick and Lee decides to fill in his spot.
34	"Save Ichiraku Ramen! / Vacations are for Training!" (Japanese: 一楽の危機を救うのです！ / 休みの日も修行です！)	November 20, 2012
Ichiraku Ramen is starting to go bankrupt because of a new ramen shop across the street. Now it's up to Lee and the gang to find a way to bring back the popularity to Ichiraku's place. Tenten and Neji try their very best to teach Lee to take a break every now and then. Will Lee follow unto their words?
35	"Caring for Animals is Hard Work / Howl at the Naruto!" (Japanese: いきもののお世話は大変なのです / ナルトにほえろ！です)	November 27, 2012
For some odd reason, all of Lee's team is given a pet to take care of. Guy finds this a perfect opportunity to teach Lee to become closer to animals. Hinata and Lee's team decide to help Hinata get closer to Naruto. They've already gone the offensive, so now they're going defensively and to let them get closer naturally.
36	"Tenten vs. Temari! / Orochimaru's Search for Love!" (Japanese: テンテンvsテマリです！ / 大蛇丸の婚活です！)	December 4, 2012
Tenten and Temari once again face in a battle, and Tenten manages to win with the help of her green tank-top embedded with a summoning weapon. Her new jutsu's name spread in the village and become a sensation instead of her victory. Orochimaru gets lonely and decides to ask Rock Lee's help in finding a partner. However, he fails again.
37	"Guy Sensei is the New Hokage! / IQ: 200, Status: Troublesome" (Japanese: ガイ先生が火影さまなのです！ / IQ200はめんどくさいのです)	December 11, 2012
Things soon get out of hand, now that Guy is the temporary Hokage. Lee's and Shikamaru's teams are sent out to find rogue ninjas, but with Shikamaru leading the way, things start to get a little troublesome.
38	"Infiltrate Akatsuki's Hideout! / A Desperate Escape Plan!" (Japanese: 暁のアジトに潜入です！ / 決死の脱出大作戦です！)	December 18, 2012
Lee's team is given a mission to spy on the Akatsuki by dressing up as them and are soon addressed as the newest member. Now that more and more members keep coming to investigate on the "new member", they start to think up a way for escape.
39	"Christmas is the Last Chance for Love! / Cleanup is a Chance to Wash Away the Past!" (Japanese: クリスマスは恋の最終決戦です！ / 大掃除は一年間の後悔と恥を洗い流すことです！)	December 25, 2012
The Hidden Leaf Village holds a big Christmas party, but with so many ninjas competing for one another's affections, will the Secret Santa turn into a battle for survival? It's time for the yearly cleanup, and in his zeal to finish quickly and ask Sakura on a date, Lee accidentally throws away something very important…
40	"A New Year's Escape Clause / Naruto Under Surveillance!" (Japanese: お正月からメンツをかけた人生すごろくです！ / ナルトを見極めるのです！)	January 8, 2013
Lee and the gang catch the adults in a game tournament, and the grand prize is not having to give their pupils a New Year's gift! Neji decides to observe Naruto and determine once and for all if the orange ninja is worthy of Hinata's affections.
41	"An Endless Nightmare / A Creation from the Future!" (Japanese: 終わらない悪夢なのです / 未来から来たカラクリです！)	January 15, 2013
Lee and his team get stuck in a storm and they have to keep each other awake or else they freeze to death. Lee gets visited by his future self but it turns out to be Orochimaru in disguise.
42	"Shino Loves Insects / Tenten Fights a Maiden's Battle!" (Japanese: 虫愛づるシノ、です / テンテン、乙女の戦場で炎上です！)	January 22, 2013
With the weather being too cold, Shino's bugs are forced to stay inside Shino to keep themselves warm and so Lee and his pals are off to find bugs to help fight with Shino. Tenten and the other kunoichi prepare themselves as they go to war in the mall.
43	"17 Nights of Staying Out of Sight / Cleaning the Bathroom Cleanses the Soul" (Japanese: 存在感を消したい17の夜です / トイレ掃除は心も綺麗にするのです！)	January 29, 2013
When the team gets assigned to infiltrate an illegal chakra-trading ring, Lee goes to Sai for advice on how to blend in with the crowd. A nefarious neer-do-well keeps leaving the village bathrooms a filthy disgusting mess, so Tsunade appoints Lee's team as guards.
44	"The Staff Will Eat the Beans Afterwards! / The Raikage is Under Attack!" (Japanese: 撒いた豆は後でスタッフが美味しく頂いたのです！ / 狙われた雷影さまです！)	February 5, 2013
Lee and his team are chosen to be Oni for the Setsubun event but Orochimaru once again, attempts to ruin their plans. After a long mission outside of the Hidden Cloud Village, the team end up protecting the Raikage.
45	"A Fiery Snow Sculpting Contest! / The Battlefield Called Valentine's Day!" (Japanese: 熱くて熱い雪像コンテストです！ / 男の戦場はバレンタインです！)	February 12, 2013
The cold, wintry, weather takes effect to the people of the Leaf Village and even saddens Tsunade! So Guy holds an ice sculpture contest to see who can bring Tsunade's spirits back up. Neji, Lee, and Naruto go on a very dangerous journey to receive chocolates from the girls.
46	"The Legendary Sannin, Jiraiya! / Infiltrate the Women's Bath!" (Japanese: 伝説の三忍、自来也さまです！ / いざ、女湯に突入です！)	February 19, 2013
The Legendary Sannin Jiraiya and his gang went to the bathhouse and struggle to gain entry. After their successful infiltration to the bathhouse, it seems they're not satisfied on what they see...
47	"Dogs Need Dog Friends / The Shinobi You've Been Waiting For!" (Japanese: 犬の友だちは犬なのです / ついにあの忍がやってきたのです！)	February 26, 2013
With Akamaru feeling lonely, the gang brings Akamaru to a dog cafe where they meet a certain Akatsuki member. Somehow, Lee and his team wind up seeing Sasuke Uchiha and meets his new "comrades".
48	"Yamato Gets a Mission / Leaf Village of the Death!" (Japanese: いよいよヤマト隊長が任務に登場です / 木ノ葉・オブ・ザ・デッドです！)	March 5, 2013
Lee and Tenten are assigned to work with Sai to retrieve a stolen forbidden scroll. However, Lee uses this time to bond with Sai. Orochimaru has unleashed a virus and everyone seems to have caught it except Lee, Neji, and Tenten. Can the three escape before the virus gets them?
49	"White Day, Destroyer of Alliances! / Take Care of the Princess Dolls!"; Transliteration: "Howaitodē bokumetsu dōmeina no desu! / O Hina-sama wo katadzukeru no desu!" (Japanese: ホワイトデー撲滅同盟なのです！ / おひな様を片付けるのです！)	March 12, 2013
As White Day comes around the corner, the sweets seem to have been taken! It's up to Lee to find out who it is before White Day! Hinamatsuri is also a celebrated Japanese custom celebrated in March but somebody thinks it's funny to keep the dolls up... So Lee goes off to fix this problem as well!
50	"Taking Care of Guy Sensei! / Lady Tsunade's Marriage Interview!"; Transliteration: "Gai-sensei wo osewa suru no desu! / Tsunade-sama no omiai desu!" (Japanese: ガイ先生をお世話するのです！ / 綱手さまのお見合いです！)	March 19, 2013
Somehow Guy is reverted into a baby and Lee uses this opportunity to prove that he is a grown-up. Lee invites Tsunade to a marriage interview and Tsunade tries everything to make it all go downhill.
51	"The Final Battle / Our Final Mission is S-Ranked!" (Japanese: 最後の任務はSランク級です！)	March 26, 2013
Sasuke ensues destruction to the Leaf Village and it is up to Lee, Naruto, and the rest of the gang to stop him. Tsunade appoints Lee's team to an S-ranked mission to successfully throw a picnic.

== Production ==
=== Development ===
The manga series Rock Lee no Seishun Full-Power Ninden by Kenji Taira was launched in December 2010 as a comedy spin-off of Masashi Kishimoto's highly-successful manga Naruto. In November 2011, Shueisha revealed that an anime project centered on the popular Naruto character Rock Lee was being developed, which was later announced to be a television series adaptation of Taira's spin-off manga. Pierrot was announced to be producing the series by February 2012, while the original voice cast reprise their roles from the Naruto anime. Kento Shimoyama developed the series composition, while Masahiko Murata acted as director until episode 26, and Gorou Sessha took over the role starting episode 27.

=== Music ===
The music of Rock Lee & His Ninja Pals was composed by Jun Abe and arranged by Seiji Muto. An original soundtrack for the series was released on August 1, 2012.

The series features six different theme songs: two openings and four endings. The first opening theme song used from episode 1 to 26 is "Give Lee Give Lee Rock Lee", performed by Animetal USA and Hironobu Kageyama, while the second opening used from episode 27 onwards is "Love Song", performed by Okamoto's. The first ending theme song used from episode 1 to 13 is "Twinkle Twinkle", performed by Secret, while the second ending used from episode 14 to 26 is "Go! Go! Here We Go!", performed by Shiritsu Ebisu Chugaku. The third ending used from episode 27 to 39 is "Daijoubu Bokura" (大丈夫、僕ら; lit. 'We'll Be Okay'), performed by Ram Wire, while the fourth ending used from episode 40 onwards is "Icha Icha Chu Chu Kyappi Kyappi Love Love Suri Suri Doki Doki" (イチャイチャチュツチュキャピキャピラブラブスリスリドキドキ; lit. 'Flirt Flirt, Kiss be Kissed, Attract Attract, Love Love, Chafe Chafe, Excited Excited'), performed by HAPPY BIRTHDAY.

== Release ==
The cover of the first DVD compilation released by Studio Pierrot and Aniplex

Rock Lee & His Ninja Pals premiered on April 3, 2012 on TV Tokyo, replacing Bleach in its 6 p.m. timeslot. It aired for 51 episodes and concluded on March 26, 2013.

Rock Lee & His Ninja Pals was broadcast in the Indian subcontinent on Sonic Nickelodeon in 2014, under the title Naruto Rock Lee. An English dub produced by Viz Media was added to the streaming service Neon Alley on November 28, 2014. As of March 2015, all 51 episodes are available for online streaming in the U.S. through Hulu and Crunchyroll in English-dubbed and subtitled formats. In Southeast Asia, Rock Lee & His Ninja Pals was broadcast on Disney XD. Global TV aired the series in Indonesian dubbing starting July 6, 2015.

The series was released by Aniplex on Region 2 DVD in Japan with three episodes per disc. The first DVD was released on July 18, 2012.
