= Road to Ninja: Naruto the Movie =

2012 Japanese anime film directed by Hayato Date

- Theatrical release poster
- Directed by: Hayato Date
- Written by: Yuka Miyata
- Story by: Masashi Kishimoto
- Produced by: Makoto Shiraishi; Naoji Hōnokidani
- Starring: Junko Takeuchi; Chie Nakamura; Toshiyuki Morikawa; Emi Shinohara; Noriaki Sugiyama
- Cinematography: Atsuho Matsumoto
- Edited by: Seiji Morita; Yukie Oikawa; Yuichi Ono
- Music by: Yasuharu Takanashi; YAIBA
- Production company: Studio Pierrot
- Distributed by: Toho
- Release date: July 28, 2012
- Running time: 110 minutes
- Country: Japan
- Language: Japanese
- Box office: ¥1.48 billion (US$17.9 million)

Road to Ninja: Naruto the Movie is a 2012 Japanese anime martial arts fantasy film based on Masashi Kishimoto's manga and anime series, Naruto, directed by the anime series primary director Hayato Date. It was released in Japan on July 28, 2012. It is the first Naruto film to have Kishimoto directly involved with its production, including its main story and new character designs. Set after the episode 251 and following the episode 311 of the Naruto: Shippuden anime series, The story focuses on the ninjas from the Hidden Leaf Village Naruto Uzumaki and Sakura Haruno who are trapped in an alternate version of their home by the true leader of the Akatsuki criminal organization, Tobi, who aims to take the mystic creature Nine-Tailed Demon Fox that was sealed inside in Naruto by his parents Minato Namikaze and Kushina Uzumaki during his birth to prevent the Fourth Great Ninja War. The alternate Hidden Leaf Village has multiple changes from Naruto's world, most notably the fact that Naruto's parents are alive, challenging the main protagonist into either giving into the world he always wanted or carrying on his parents' legacy to defeat the Akatsuki.

The film was released on DVD and Blu-ray on November 25, 2014. Road to Ninja: Naruto the Movie was praised for Naruto's exposure to a more cheerful life which challenges the protagonist, as that was what he always wanted, but he instead decides to rebel against Akatsuki. Though the action sequences were praised, some critics felt the animation was poorly made by Pierrot in scenes set at night. The film went on to become one of the most popular Naruto films, surpassing Naruto the Movie: Blood Prison but eventually being surpassed by its successors The Last: Naruto the Movie and Boruto: Naruto the Movie; in total, the film grossed US$17.9 million in the Japanese box office.

== Plot ==
Following his encounter with his mother and obtaining the Nine-Tails Chakra Mode, Naruto Uzumaki has returned to the Hidden Leaf. He and the rest of the Konoha 11, led by Kakashi Hatake and Might Guy, drive off a group of White Zetsu posing as fallen Akatsuki members. Upon their return, everyone's parents decide to have their children recommended to become Jonin, with the exception of Naruto due to his parents being deceased and Sakura Haruno whose parents Kizashi Haruno and Mebuki Haruno dismiss her capabilities. Naruto begins to feel depressed about not having had parents growing up, leading him to lash out at Iruka Umino and hate the ramen Menma. Sakura, after arguing with her mother Mebuki, later uses Naruto as an excuse to avoid her. Alone at the park, the two are confronted by the Akatsuki real leader Tobi (who at this point they believe to be Madara Uchiha), who proceeds to blind them with a great light before fleeing.

Regaining their senses, Naruto and Sakura discover the world around them significantly changed: their friends' personalities are the polar opposite of their original demeanors; Sasuke Uchiha never left the village and is now a womanizer; Naruto is referred to by others as "Menma"; no one knows who Madara is; and Kizashi Haruno was the Fourth Hokage, him and Mebuki sacrificing their lives to seal the Nine-Tails inside Menma, leading Sakura to become adored as the "Child of Heroes". It is revealed that Tobi subjected them to a genjutsu-based, limited version of the Infinite Tsukuyomi, the Limited Tsukuyomi, in the hopes of claiming the Nine-Tails without resorting to the Fourth Great Ninja War.

Naruto and Sakura begin investigating the world in the hopes of finding a way back home, but Sakura begins relishing her lack of parents and newfound fame. They eventually meet with Tsunade, who reveals the existence of a Masked Man who has been attacking villages in order to obtain an object called the Red Moon Scroll; Jiraiya found and hid the scroll before being killed by the Masked Man. With the location known, Tsunade assigns a mission to find it, being led by Naruto's parents Minato Namikaze and Kushina Uzumaki, who never died due to the Harunos' sacrifice and are active, regular ninja. Naruto, Sakura, Kakashi, and Guy also join the mission (the former two hoping to use the scroll to escape the Limited Tsukuyomi), but Naruto becomes enraged at his parents' presence, believing Tobi to be taunting him, and refuses to reciprocate when they show him affection.

During the mission, the team is attacked by Jiraiya's toads, who never developed a kinship with Minato and Naruto and thus treat the group as intruders. In the ensuing fight, Kushina injures her ankle trying to shield Naruto from a poison attack. Minato eventually obtains the scroll, and Sakura heals Kushina. Naruto's parents lecture and console him over the turn of events, overwhelming Naruto with emotion. Upon learning the scroll can only be activated during a red lunar eclipse, Naruto and Sakura realize they have to wait till then. Sakura soon begins to realize the loneliness Naruto felt as an orphan, while Naruto accepts the fake Minato and Kushina as his parents and begins enjoying spending time with them.

The village is then attacked by the Masked Man, having allied himself with Tobi, who has used an incorporeal form to observe the Limited Tsukuyomi. The Masked Man captures Sakura to hold ransom for the Red Moon Scroll, then proceeds to destroy the village. Naruto attempts to leave to save Sakura, but Minato and Kushina hold him back. Realizing they are not like his actual parents, Naruto reveals his true identity to them and thanks them for spending time with him. Wearing Kizashi's Hokage cloak, he takes the Red Moon Scroll and leaves to save Sakura and face the Masked Man, finding them at an old training ground used by Jiraiya and Minato.

While the Akatsuki – a group of mercenaries led by Sasuke's older brother Itachi Uchiha in this universe – dispatch the Masked Man's puppets, Naruto battles against the Masked Man, who is revealed to be the real Menma. Menma absorbs the defeated masked beasts to manifest the Black Nine-Tails, with the Nine-Tails making a temporary truce with Naruto to defeat its evil counterpart. However, this all plays to Tobi's plan as he possesses Menma so he can personally extract the weakened Nine-Tails from Naruto while completely wiping his mind. Sakura saves Naruto before the Nine-Tails is extracted from him, and Naruto regains his memories from looking at the scroll. Naruto and Sakura, along with assistance from Minato and Kushina, then force Tobi out of Menma and undo the Limited Tsukuyomi. Once back in their reality, after informing Tsunade of their ordeal, Sakura tearfully reunites with her parents while Naruto makes amends with Iruka and realizes he already has a family in his friends.

== Voice cast ==
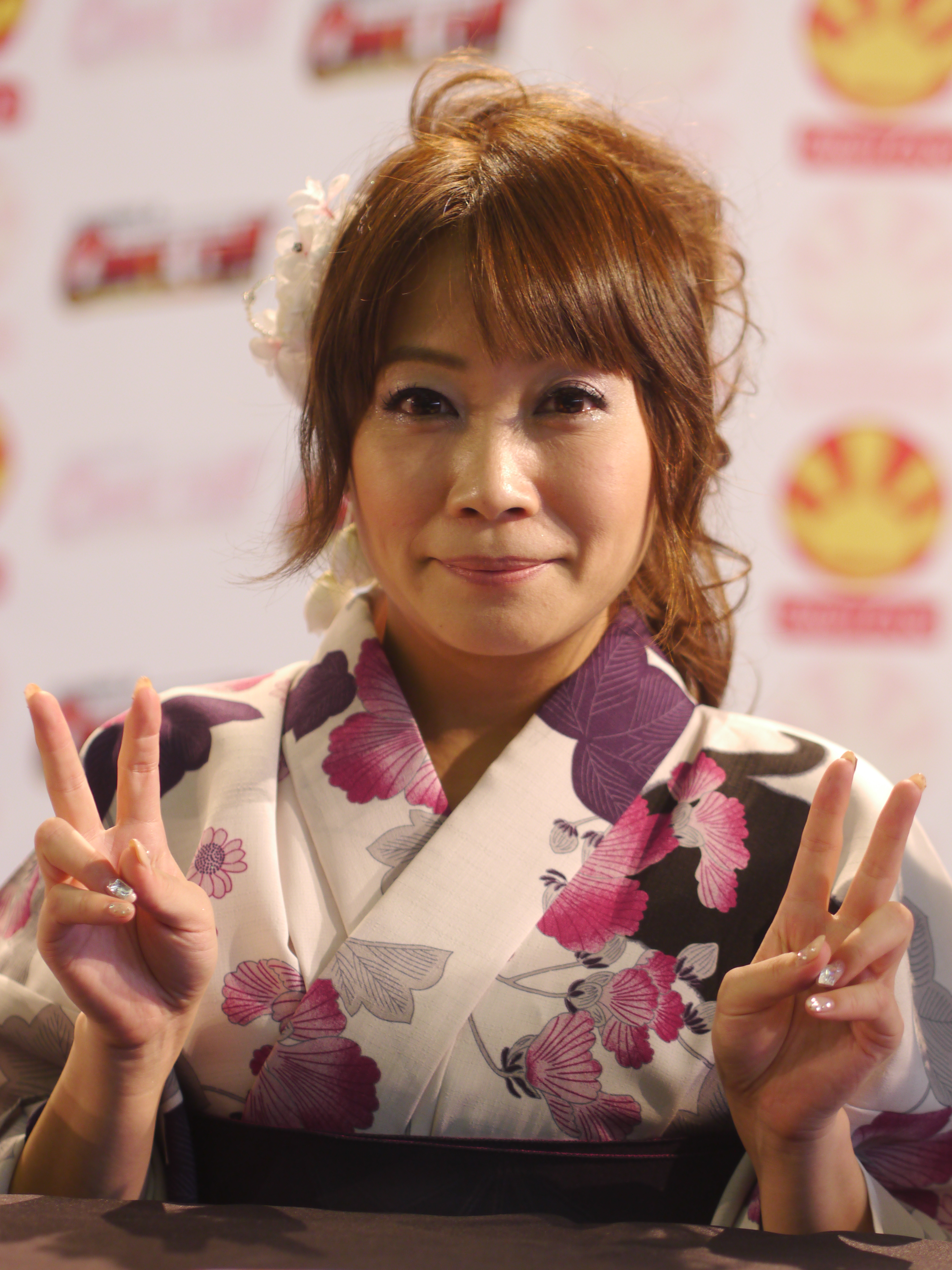
Junko Takeuchi voiced both the protagonist Naruto and his alternate counterpart Menma.

Character	Japanese	English
Naruto Uzumaki / Menma	Junko Takeuchi	Maile Flanagan
Sakura Haruno	Chie Nakamura	Kate Higgins
Minato Namikaze	Toshiyuki Morikawa	Tony Oliver
Kushina Uzumaki	Emi Shinohara	Laura Bailey
Tobi	Naoya Uchida	Neil Kaplan
Hinata Hyuga	Nana Mizuki	Stephanie Sheh
Rock Lee	Yōichi Masukawa	Brian Donovan
Neji Hyuga	Kōichi Tōchika	Steve Staley
Tenten	Yukari Tamura	Danielle Judovits
Kiba Inuzuka	Kōsuke Toriumi	Kyle Hebert
Shino Aburame	Shinji Kawada	Derek Stephen Prince
Shikamaru Nara	Showtaro Morikubo	Tom Gibis
Choji Akimichi	Kentarō Itō	Robbie Rist
Ino Yamanaka	Ryōka Yuzuki	Colleen Villard
Jiraiya	Hōchū Ōtsuka	David Lodge
Tsunade	Masako Katsuki	Debi Mae West
Shizune	Keiko Nemoto	Megan Hollingshead
Sasuke Uchiha	Noriaki Sugiyama	Yuri Lowenthal
Sai	Satoshi Hino	Ben Diskin
Kakashi Hatake	Kazuhiko Inoue	Dave Wittenberg
Might Guy	Masashi Ebara	Skip Stellrecht
Iruka Umino	Toshihiko Seki	Quinton Flynn
Choza Akimichi	Nobuaki Fukuda	Michael Sorich
Inoichi Yamanaka	Daiki Nakamura	Kyle Hebert
Tsume Inuzuka	Seiko Fujiki	Mary Elizabeth McGlynn
Kizashi Haruno	Yasunori Matsumoto	Steven Blum
Mebuki Haruno	Kazue Ikura	Kate Higgins
Itachi Uchiha	Hideo Ishikawa	Crispin Freeman
Kisame Hoshigaki	Tomoyuki Dan	Kirk Thornton
Deidara	Katsuhiko Kawamoto	Roger Craig Smith
Hidan	Masaki Terasoma	Chris Edgerly
Kakuzu	Takaya Hashi	Fred Tatasciore
Zetsu	Nobuo Tobita	Travis Willingham
Gamabunta	Hiroshi Naka	Michael Sorich
Gamariki	Toshiharu Sakurai	Dave Wittenberg
Kurama	Tesshō Genda	Paul St. Peter
Teuchi	Eisuke Asakura	Patrick Seitz

== Production ==
The movie was first announced in March 2012 by Shueisha as part of the series' 10th anniversary. Its first teaser was released in April of the same year. Manga author Masashi Kishimoto wanted to write Naruto Uzumaki properly as a protagonist, especially his more sensitive side with the movie. This was done through fussed a lot over the ramen shop scene between Naruto and Iruka Umino at the beginning. The mangaka came up with all the storyboards, but since for some reason the images were different, he had all of them fixed by other people working with him in Pierrot. Although Minato Namikaze and Kushina Uzumaki are dead in the main story, he used the movie's chance to write more family scenes with them and their son Naruto and further explore Naruto's sensitive side. Besides Naruto's parents, Kishimoto decided to include Sakura's parents until now. In his mind, he had the image for Sakura's parents, which include back-and-forth arguing matches, but he just never could find the right time to do so. Due the multiple characters appearing in the movie, Kishimoto thought no readers would be interested so instead decided to write them in the movie. In promoting the movie, a short Road to Sakura episode was made featuring the social life of its title character. Kishimoto also drew his own prequel chapter focused on Naruto. A drama CD focused on the alternate Sasuke was made.

Among the cast, Junko Takeuchi returns to play the lead as well as the villain Menma. The actress said people said that the "parent-child love" theme resonated with them, and we received many messages such as, wanting to develop more their relationships. Takeuchi found it as a deep film that made people watch the movie more and relate more with its characters. She claims that while Naruto is always the same, the movie helped further address his growth when exploring his relationship with his parents and his own philosophy about what a ninja is, something the production studio wanted to be seen as the message. The more Naruto pours out his heartfelt thoughts about his life, the more she felt scared about dubbing. She sometimes got scared that I might not be able to show everyone what Naruto has, that she might not be able to catch up with him. Naruto's desire to protect and help has never changed. And because his feelings are so straightforward, there are times when he feels like his own distracting thoughts are getting in the way and he doesn't want to let anything improper in. She believes such thing will not change in the future. In promoting the movie, Takeuchi participated in a tour where she met several children who loved the characters.

The band Asian Kung-Fu Generation performed the theme song "Sore de wa, Mata Ashita" (それでは、また明日; lit. 'Well Then, See You Tomorrow'). Both the single CD and the film's soundtrack were released on July 25, 2012. The first 1.5 million people to see the film were given the Motion Comic: Naruto DVD. The official soundtracks was released on July 25, 2012. The film was released on DVD and Blu-ray on November 25, 2014. The film aired on Japanese televisions, earning a 2.1% rating in January 2015. Funimation streamed the movie in 2020 in Western regions. The Japanese DVD sold 18,890 units becoming one of the best-selling home medias releases from 2013.

== Reception ==
The lead Naruto and the antagonist Menma were praised over their role in the film with Masashi Kishimoto illustrating them together to celebrate the film's success.

=== Box office ===
The film debuted in the Japanese box office third earning US$3,799,276. On August 14, 2012, Yahoo announced grossed sales of over ¥1 billion (US$12.7 million) and the rate was expected to be the highest-grossing film surpassing Naruto the Movie: Ninja Clash in the Land of Snow (1.37 billion yen/US$17.4 million). Masashi Kishimoto drew Naruto and Menma to commemorate the film's achievement. Road to Ninja became the highest grossing Naruto film making ¥ 1.46 billion (US$18.3 million) between its opening on July 28 and September 23, but it was surpassed by The Last: Naruto the Movie. In 2012, the film made ¥ 1.48 billion and ranked 29th among the Japanese box office films, including live action ones. In the Philippines, the film earned a total grossed amount of $123,613.00 (PhP 5,068,627) on its 2-week run.

=== Critical response ===
HobbyConsolas had mixed feelings about the film's premise since it offers alternative takes of Hinata Hyuga and Sasuke Uchiha that come across as hilarious but the plot instead focuses on a far darker story with emotional focus on Naruto's relationship with his parents and the handling of the villains Tobi and Menma. However, they felt the animation tends to change between scenes from good fighting scenes to poorly drawn calm scenes. Anime UK News felt that only returning fans would enjoy the movie as it does not stand out on its own but still praised its fight sequences and touching moments. Nevertheless, they criticized its low number of action scenes, which they described as unusual for the franchise. Los Angeles Times in particularly enjoyed the final fight between Naruto and Menma due to how entertaining it is. The writer also praised Naruto's scenes with his parents as it helps the protagonist which deepens the protagonist and helps him to overcome Tobi's schemes. Fandom Post was surprised by the quality of the movie based on the poor trend Shonen Jump series tend to have when given animated films. He was primarily impressed with the handling of Naruto and Sakura's characters due to how the narrative treats their social lives which leads to touching and heroic moments when the leads decide to face Tobi to return to their original world. While he considered Menma an obvious villain, he acclaimed his fight with Naruto as one of the film's best animated moments. As a result, he believes the film could have come across as a canonical manga story arc rather than a film.

Indiewire in particular enjoyed Naruto's characterization as he stands more than just a prankster but more like an imperfect hero Masashi Kishimoto teased in interviews especially when he has to decide between a world with or without his parents and defeat the villains. Anime Inferno was also impressed with Naruto's character arc in the movie which made him come across as the most inspirational hero in anime for the reviewer which made the film look as the best one from the franchise so far. RiceDigital considered the film to be well written for featuring several heartwarming, comical and serious scenes just like the series. In particular, Naruto's life with his parents was regarded as one of the best parts of the film as the viewer can see the hero struggling with accepting them in Tobi's fake world or challenge reality and go back to the real world where he lives alone. He also praised the distinctive character designs featured in the movie but still felt scenes where the story takes place at night had jarring animation. Capsule Monsters agreed, believing the movie should have had more focus on the gags from the alternate characters and is mostly enjoyable thanks to its actions sequences rather than any development that could have been provided by the leads. While they found the music generic, the ending theme "Soredewa Mata Ashita" was found more enjoyable. On the other hand, Comics Online found the film suitable for newcomers, praising its "deep" storyline despite offering comic relief scenes common in the series and believes that fans of martial arts films and sorcery films would enjoy the movie.
