= Naruto the Movie: Blood Prison =

2011 Japanese animated film directed by Masahiko Murata

- Japanese film poster
- Directed by: Masahiko Murata
- Written by: Akira Higashiyama
- Produced by: Fukashi Azuma; Naoji Hōnokidani
- Starring: Junko Takeuchi; Mie Sonozaki; Masaki Terasoma; Yūichi Nakamura
- Cinematography: Atsuho Matsumoto
- Edited by: Seiji Morita; Yuki Oikawa
- Music by: Yasuharu Takanashi; Yaiba
- Production company: Studio Pierrot
- Distributed by: Toho
- Release date: July 27, 2011
- Running time: 102 minutes
- Country: Japan
- Language: Japanese
- Box office: ¥800 million (US$9.1 million)

Naruto the Movie: Blood Prison (Japanese: 劇場版 NARUTO(ナルト) ブラッド・プリズン, Hepburn: Gekijō-ban Naruto Buraddo Purizun) is a 2011 Japanese anime action fantasy film based on Masashi Kishimoto's manga and anime series. It was released in Japan on July 27, 2011, in North America on February 18, 2014, and in Indonesia on April 19, 2015. Neon Alley began streaming the anime film on January 26, 2014. The theme song "Otakebi" is performed by Yusuke Kamiji. The film is set after the episode 196 of the Naruto: Shippuden anime series.

== Plot ==
Naruto Uzumaki is arrested and sent to Hozuki Castle (鬼灯城, Hoozuki Jō) in the Hidden Grass Village, after he is framed for attacking the Fourth Raikage. Mui (無為), the head of the prison, places the Fire Style: Celestial Prison (火遁・天牢, Katon: Tenrō) seal on Naruto and limits his chakra. Ryūzetsu (竜舌), a Hidden Grass Black Ops member, tells him that Mui used Hot Water villager Kazan to frame Naruto, and Mui's son Muku (無垢) was sacrificed and sealed into the Box of Paradise ten years ago. During the prison riot, Mui uses Naruto's fox chakra to unlock the box, only for the revived Muku to be possessed by the demon Satori (サトリ) and invade the castle. Naruto and his friends fail to defeat Satori, but the dying Mui seals it within Muku with the formula and the victim returns to the box. As the group recapture the survived prisoners, Ryūzetsu dies using Dragon Life Reincarnation to save Naruto. The ninjas bury Mui and Ryūzetsu, and place the sealed box at sea. Tsunade informs the team that Naruto's false arrest was rehearsed. Naruto leaves Ryūzetsu's bandana tied around the gravestone, promising to cherish the life she returned to him, and re-quoting what she said about being a guiding light by protecting the things people cherish.

== Voice cast ==
Character	Japanese Voice Actor	English Voice Actor
Naruto Uzumaki	Junko Takeuchi	Maile Flanagan
Sakura Haruno	Chie Nakamura	Kate Higgins
Kakashi Hatake	Kazuhiko Inoue	Dave Wittenberg
Yamato	Rikiya Koyama	Troy Baker
Tsunade	Masako Katsuki	Debi Mae West
Shikamaru Nara	Showtaro Morikubo	Tom Gibis
Choji Akimichi	Kentarō Itō	Robbie Rist
Kiba Inuzuka	Kōsuke Toriumi	Kyle Hebert
Neji Hyūga	Kōichi Tōchika	Steve Staley
Tenten	Yukari Tamura	Danielle Judovits
Gamabunta	Hiroshi Naka	Michael Sorich
Fourth Raikage	Hideaki Tezuka	Beau Billingslea
Killer Bee	Hisao Egawa	Catero Colbert
Samui	Hikari Yono	Cindy Robinson
Omoi	Kunihiro Kawamoto	Ogie Banks
Karui	Yuka Komatsu	Danielle Nicolet
Mui	Masaki Terasoma	Matthew Mercer
Ryūzetsu	Mie Sonozaki	Carrie Keranen
Muku/Satori	Yūichi Nakamura; Kengo Kawanishi (child)	Grant George; Bryce Papenbrook (child)
Kazan	Kōsei Hirota	Steve Staley
Maroi	Takaya Kamikawa	Andrew Kishino
Might Guy	Masashi Ebara	Skip Stellrecht
Sai	Satoshi Hino	Ben Diskin
Rock Lee	Yoichi Masukawa	Brian Donovan

== Home media ==
The film was released on DVD on April 25, 2012.
