= Naruto Shippuden the Movie =

2007 Japanese animated film directed by Hajime Kamegaki

- North American box art
- Directed by: Hajime Kamegaki
- Written by: Junki Takegami
- Produced by: Mikihiko Fukozawa; Shoji Matsui; Kazuteru Oshikiri
- Starring: Junko Takeuchi; Chie Nakamura; Yōichi Masukawa; Kōichi Tōchika
- Cinematography: Atsuho Matsumoto
- Edited by: Yukie Oikawa; Seiji Morita
- Music by: Yasuharu Takanashi; Yaiba
- Production company: Studio Pierrot
- Distributed by: Toho
- Release date: August 4, 2007
- Running time: 95 minutes
- Country: Japan
- Language: Japanese
- Box office: ¥1.21 billion (US$10.0 million)

Naruto Shippuden the Movie (Japanese: 劇場版 NARUTO(ナルト) 疾風伝, Hepburn: Gekijō-ban Naruto Shippūden) is an animated martial arts fantasy film and the fourth overall in the Naruto film series and the first Naruto: Shippuden film, directed by Hajime Kamegaki and written by Junki Takegami. The movie is set after the episode 32 of the Naruto: Shippuden anime series.

== Plot ==
The film opens with a prediction that Naruto Uzumaki dies battling a monster. A funeral is held for Naruto at his home village, where others attend. Tsunade looks out at the window and ponders if everything is just decided by fate.

A few days earlier, a man named Yomi attacks a shrine to retrieve the spirit of Mōryō, a demon attempting to conquer the world and create his "Thousand Year Kingdom". Since he is lacking a body, Yomi offers his as a temporary substitute until they can retrieve Mōryō's original one. The only threat to Mōryō's plan is a priestess named Shion, who has the ability to seal his spirit away once more; she can also foresee a person's death. He raises a stone army from their slumber to attack the rest of the world while his four subordinates go to eliminate Shion. They are given special chakra creatures to enhance their strength.

To deal with the threat, the Land of Fire sends out many advance teams to stall the stone army. Naruto, Sakura Haruno, Rock Lee, and Neji Hyuga are sent to guard Shion, and deliver her to the shrine where Mōryō's body is kept. They fend off Shion's four would-be assassins, and afterward, Shion prophesies Naruto's upcoming death. Shion's total acceptance of "fate", as well as her selfish attitude, provokes Naruto into antagonizing her. As they head for the shrine, they are again ambushed by the assassins, and Shion is seemingly killed. It turns out to be a ruse: the dead "Shion" is actually her servant, Taruho, acting as a decoy by the use of the Shadow Mirror Body Transfer Jutsu. After Neji tells Naruto to escort Shion to the temple alone, Shion explains that her predictions work by using others' lives to protect her own. Naruto insists that he will survive and likewise will keep Shion safe.

Together, Sakura, Lee, and Neji defeat the assassins, and at the mountain temple where Mōryō's body is kept, Naruto and Shion find the stone army waiting. Naruto holds the army back, while Shion heads inside to begin the sealing ritual, where Yomi tricks Shion into beginning the technique with him inside the barrier, allowing Mōryō's spirit to reunite with his body. After Kakashi Hatake, Might Guy, Shikamaru Nara and Temari destroy the stone army, Naruto comes to rescue Shion. About to see her prediction of his death come true, Shion uses her bell's power to change Naruto's fate. She is able to tap into her true powers, intending to kill herself and Mōryō to save Naruto (for whom she has developed feelings for him). Naruto stops her seconds before her death, and creates Rasengan (螺旋丸, lit. spiral sphere, English manga: "Spiral Chakra Sphere") by combining Shion's chakra with his. Naruto drives the Rasengan into Mōryō and obliterates it.

In the final scene, Naruto asks Shion what she intends to do now. She replies that Mōryō was a demon created by the dark thoughts of mankind, and that there is bound to be another Mōryō someday. Because of this, she says that she must continue the line of priestesses that will suppress demons like Mōryō. Shion then asks Naruto if he will help her (a double entendre asking if he will be the father of her child), much to the shock of Sakura, Kakashi, and Lee. Naruto, clueless as usual, agrees without realizing the second meaning of her question.

== Voice cast ==
Character	Japanese voice	English voice
Naruto Uzumaki	Junko Takeuchi	Maile Flanagan
Sakura Haruno	Chie Nakamura	Kate Higgins
Rock Lee	Yōichi Masukawa	Brian Donovan
Neji Hyuga	Kōichi Tōchika	Steve Staley
Tsunade	Masako Katsuki	Debi Mae West
Shizune	Keiko Nemoto	Megan Hollingshead
Kakashi Hatake	Kazuhiko Inoue	Dave Wittenberg
Might Guy	Masashi Ebara	Skip Stellrecht
Shikamaru Nara	Showtaro Morikubo	Tom Gibis
Temari	Romi Park	Tara Platt
Shion	Ayumi Fujimura	Laura Bailey
Miroku	Fumiko Orikasa	Laura Bailey
Taruho	Yoshinori Fujita	Wil Wheaton
Moryo	Seizō Katō	Daran Norris
Yomi	Hidetoshi Nakamura	Vic Mignogna
Gitai	Kishō Taniyama	Roger Craig Smith
Setsuna	Katsuyuki Konishi	Keith Silverstein
Susuki	Daisuke Kishio	Sam Riegel
Kusuna	Tetsuya Kakihara	Crispin Freeman
Shizuku	Miyuki Sawashiro	Michael Yurchak

== Production ==
The film was produced by Aniplex, Bandai Co., Ltd., Dentsu Inc., Pierrot, Shueisha and TV Tokyo. Its official theme song is "Lie-Lie-Lie" by DJ Ozma.

It was released on DVD in Japan on April 23, 2008, and in the United States on November 10, 2009. It was announced that the American version could be pre-ordered with the limited edition of Naruto Shippuden: Clash of Ninja Revolution 3 before its release. The English version aired on Disney XD in the United States on May 15, 2011.

== Reception ==
In its opening weekend Naruto Shippuden: The Movie came in at number six. In its second week the movie dropped to number eight and stayed there in its third week. The film grossed $13,219,807 in the box offices. The home media release of the movie was also well received in Japan.

The setup provided by the early trailer alluding to Naruto's death was noted to surprise the fans based on the recent airing of the second animated adaptation of the long-time popularity of the title character. UK Anime felt the film was too gruesome in general despite the ratings presented to the point he believed the younger demographic would be shocked by the violent acts such as fighters being impaled or losing a considerable amount of blood. Active Anime praised the shocking story of Naruto's death and the large amount of well-animated fight scenes created across the narrative. Comic Book Resources listed it as one of the best Naruto movies, citing its darker themes when compared with the previous trilogy alongside the well-choreographed fight sequences but considered it as "filler" as it has no impact in the manga's narrative, most notably due to the focus on Naruto's potential death. Hobby Consolas compared the movie with the first Naruto movie due to the focus on Naruto's work as a bodyguard but more on a romantic tone due to the development Shion shows across the story. The website also praised the animation, claiming the CGI performed on the villains was well executed and soundtrack manages to improve the atmosphere. Despite the dark nature of the movie, Animation Scoop felt that Pierrot managed to balance the media with comedy. Nevertheless, he also praised the handling of animation like Hobby Consolas due to how menacing are the antagonists and how well-animated are the fights. UK Anime, in particular, enjoyed the fight between Rock Lee and one of Yomi's followers as the most outstanding parts of the movie, comparing it to The Ghost Army. In closing the review, UK Anime called it "entertaining enough to be a kind of popcorn movie for normal anime viewers" and "For the Naruto fans, however, it's a good, solid movie to add to your collection".
