= Naruto the Movie: Guardians of the Crescent Moon Kingdom =

2006 film by Toshiyuki Tsuru

- Theatrical release poster
- Directed by: Toshiyuki Tsuru
- Written by: Toshiyuki Tsuru
- Starring: Junko Takeuchi; Chie Nakamura; Kyōsuke Ikeda; Akio Ōtsuka
- Music by: Toshio Masuda
- Production company: Studio Pierrot
- Distributed by: Toho
- Release date: 5 August 2006
- Running time: 95 minutes
- Country: Japan
- Language: Japanese
- Box office: $3,224,005

Naruto the Movie: Guardians of the Crescent Moon Kingdom (Japanese: 劇場版 NARUTO(ナルト) 大興奮!みかづき島のアニマル騒動だってばよ, Hepburn: Gekijō-ban Naruto Dai Kōfun! Mikazuki-jima no Animaru Panikku Dattebayo; lit. "Theatrical Feature Naruto: Great Excitement! The Animal Panic of Crescent Moon Island!") is a 2006 Japanese animated martial arts fantasy adventure film based on Masashi Kishimoto's manga and anime franchise. It is the third and final film for the series during Part I, before the first film was released during Part II.

It was announced on August 6, 2005, at the opening of Naruto the Movie: Legend of the Stone of Gelel. TV Tokyo's website states that Great Excitement! The Animal Panic of Crescent Moon Island! was released in DVD format on April 25, 2007. The film is set after episode 196 of the Naruto anime series. The film's footage is seen in the opening and ending credits for episodes 197 through 199. In the United States, the film aired on Cartoon Network on November 8, 2008, and was released on DVD on November 11, 2008.

The film's song "Tsubomi" is performed by Maria. The first audience to see the film in certain theaters were to receive the yo-yo, featuring Naruto and the Rasengan.

== Plot ==
Naruto Uzumaki, Kakashi Hatake, Sakura Haruno and Rock Lee are assigned to protect prince Hikaru Tsuki and his father Michiru, the heir to the incredibly prosperous Land of the Moon, on their trip back to their kingdom. Hikaru's spoiled attitude irritates Naruto throughout the journey and the team quickly discovers about Michiru's incredible wealth when he nonchalantly buys an entire circus for Hikaru because he wanted to befriend its star attractions, a saber-toothed cat named Chamū and its monkey partner Kiki. Hikaru's attempts to befriend Chamū, but ends badly with Chamū attacking him, forcing Naruto to rescue him.

When Michiru's caravan reaches the port that will take them back to the Land of the Moon, Michiru and Hikaru visit Michiru's ex-wife Amayo. Though Amayo is happy to see Hikaru, she dismisses Michiru's attempts to reform their marriage because of Michiru's materialistic perspective and the fact that he fails to understand "what really matters." During the ship ride to the Land of the Moon the ship gets caught in a storm and the crew is forced to secure the circus animals that were brought aboard Hikaru, bitter about Chamū's aggressive attitude towards him, becomes indifferent about the safety of the animals and Naruto expresses his disgust at his disregard for the animal's lives and his selfishness. Desiring to prove Naruto wrong, Hikaru assists in securing the animals and gets Chamū and Kiki to safety with Naruto's help.

After the storm, Hikaru becomes friends with Chamū and Kiki and he and Naruto apologizes to each other and become friends as well. When the ship reaches the Land of the Moon, everyone discovers the streets are empty and that Shabadaba, a greedy minister to the king of the Land of the Moon, Kakeru, has overthrown the king and seized control of the Land of the Moon. Shabadaba orders the kingdom's guards to kill Michiru and Hikaru, but they manage to escape with the help of Naruto and the others as well as guards still loyal to Michiru led by the captain of the Land of the Moon military, Korega. Korega takes the group to a refuge in the mountains where the meet Kakeru, who is mortally wounded, and Korega reveals Shabadaba had been planning his coup for a while and that Kakeru sent Michiru on the tour of the kingdoms to keep him out of danger.

However, Shabadaba had hired three mercenary ninja to back him up and their leader, Ishidate, used a mysterious gauntlet to mortally wound Kakeru by turning his lower half into stone. Sakura is unable to treat the petrification because it can only be treated immediately after it happens and before dying, Kakeru tells Michiru that happiness and wealth are not the same and proclaims Michiru the King of the Land of the Moon. Korega organizes an escape from the Land of Moon in order to seek help from other nations in defeating Shabadaba, but it fails when the mercenary ninja attack and incapacitate the team with a reflex-weakening poison. Ishidate kills Korega by petrifying him and shattering him into pieces and Michiru is captured. When one of the mercenary ninja tries to kill Hikaru, it causes Naruto to tap into some of the Nine-Tails' power and save him.

However, the mercenary ninja escape with Michiru and take him to Shabadaba. Michiru questions Shabadaba about why he betrayed Kakeru and Shabadaba reveals that Kakeru wanted to focus the Land of the Moon's wealth to help its citizens, believing they were the kingdom's greatest treasure, and Shabadaba overthrew Kakeru in order to obtain the kingdom's wealth all for himself. Hikaru is heartbroken at his father's kidnapping, but Naruto encourages him to protect "what really matters" and the group rallies to save Michiru. Shabadaba decides to have Michiru executed by tying a noose around his neck and forcing him on board that can't support his large weight for long so when it snaps, Michiru will be hanged. Remembering his late father's words and finally realizing the error of his materialist ways, Michiru manages to hold out until the group tricks Shabadaba into letting them into the palace courtyard with the help of the circus Michiru bought and Kakashi launches a surprise attack along with the circus crew and Korega's men.

Hikaru and Naruto sneak into the palace to rescue Michiru while Lee and Sakura fight and defeat both of Ishidate's underlings, Karenbana and Kongō. As Naruto battles Ishidate, the board holding up Michiru snaps and Michiru begins to hang, but Hikaru manages to save him by firing an arrow that cuts the rope. Naruto manages to overwhelm Ishidate at first, but the latter manages to petrify Naruto's leg and petrifies Shabadaba when he tries to get Ishidate to kill Michiru first. Michiru and Hikaru help Naruto fight Ishidate by carrying him so Naruto can attack with the Rasengan, which is further powered by the Land of the Moon's unique moonlight, and Naruto manages to kill both Ishidate and Shabadaba when the former is distracted by Chamū and Kiki.

After the battle is over, Michiru thanks Naruto for helping him understand "what really matters" and both he and Hikaru promise never to forget what they learned. In the aftermath of the battle, Kakashi's extreme exhaustion from overusing his Sharingan forces the team to stay at the Land of the Moon for two weeks where they enjoy a vacation and see Michiru and Hikaru's inauguration as the new King and Prince of The Land of the Moon before they eventually leave to return home. After the team leaves Michiru reveals to Hikaru that he will try to reconcile with Amayo now that he understands "what really matters."

== Cast ==
Character	Japanese voice	English voice
Naruto Uzumaki	Junko Takeuchi	Maile Flanagan
Sakura Haruno	Chie Nakamura	Kate Higgins
Rock Lee	Yōichi Masukawa	Brian Donovan
Kakashi Hatake	Kazuhiko Inoue	Dave Wittenberg
Hikaru Tsuki	Kyōsuke Ikeda	Kari Wahlgren
Michiru Tsuki	Akio Ōtsuka	Michael Sorich
Korega	Kenji Hamada	Kirk Thornton
Tsunade	Masako Katsuki	Debi Mae West
Amayo	Marika Hayashi	Bridget Hoffman
Shabadaba	Umeji Sasaki	Terrence Stone
Ishidate	Masashi Sugawara	Christopher Corey Smith
Kongō	Hisao Egawa	Keith Silverstein
Karenbana	Haruhi Terada	Cindy Robinson
Kakeru Tsuki	Rokuro Naya	Michael Forest
