= Neon Alley =

American anime streaming website

- Type: Online stream of anime programming
- Genre: Anime
- Founded: October 2, 2012; 14 years ago
- Defunct: May 4, 2016; 10 years ago
- Headquarters: San Francisco, California
- Area served: United States
- Parent: Viz Media
- Website: Viz Media

Neon Alley was an American digital anime service run by Viz Media. The service began as a 24-hour linear web channel dedicated to showing English dubbed anime series in uncut and uncensored formats. It later evolved into a Hulu-based streaming site, showcasing both dubbed and subtitled releases.

Neon Alley's programming was streamed through Hulu, which is available on PlayStation 3, Xbox 360, PC, Mac, and other platforms.

== History ==
Neon Alley was first announced at San Diego Comic-Con 2012 on July 13, 2012, where it was announced for PlayStation 3 via the PlayStation Network in North America for a monthly subscription fee. The service launched on October 2, 2012. Along with various series such as Naruto and Death Note, the channel premiered newly dubbed series, as well as live-action and anime movies. The service was later made available for Xbox 360 via Xbox Live from February 12, 2013. At Anime Expo 2013, Viz announced that the service would be available on PC and Mac, along with a new feature where subscribers could catch-up on past episodes.

It was announced on February 11, 2014, that Neon Alley would discontinue its web channel format and transition to become a free on-demand service for those living in the United States. Series will be streamed through their website or through Internet connected devices on Hulu: a joint venture between NBCUniversal Television Group, Disney-ABC Television Group and Fox Broadcasting Company. The change took effect on April 1, 2014. Following the relaunch, as a direct result of migrating to Hulu, viewers living in Canada lost access to the website. After Viz.com was relaunched in Spring 2016, the Neon Alley name was dropped. By that point, its blog and social media accounts had not been updated since 2015. On July 21, 2016, Tubi announced that they had commenced streaming of certain Viz titles in Canada.

== Shows ==
^{†}Indicates titles that have never received an official streaming release in Canada

=== English dub premieres ===
- Accel World (TV-14)
- Blue Exorcist (TV-14)
- Blood Lad (TV-14)^{†}
- Coppelion (TV-14)^{†}
- Fate/Zero (TV-MA)
- Gargantia on the Verdurous Planet (TV-14)
- Inuyasha: The Final Act (TV-14)
- K (TV-14)
- Lagrange: The Flower of Rin-ne (TV-MA and TV-14)
- Magi: The Labyrinth of Magic (TV-14)
- Nana (TV-MA)
- Naruto: Shippuden (TV-PG)
- Naruto Spin-off: Rock Lee & His Ninja Pals (TV-14)
- Nura: Rise of the Yokai Clan (TV-14)^{†}
  - Nura: Rise of the Yokai Clan - Demon Capital (TV-14)
- Sailor Moon (TV-PG)
- Sailor Moon Crystal (TV-PG)
- Tiger & Bunny (TV-14)
- Zetman (TV-MA)

=== Other series ===
- Bakuman (TV-14)
- Bleach (TV-14)
- Blue Dragon (TV-Y7)^{†}
  - Blue Dragon: Trial of the Seven Shadows (TV-Y7)
- Buso Renkin (TV-14)
- Cross Game (TV-G)
- Death Note (TV-14)
- Gurren Lagann (TV-14)
- Highschool of the Dead (TV-MA)
- Hikaru no Go (TV-14)
- Honey and Clover (TV-14)
  - Honey and Clover II (TV-14)
- Hunter × Hunter (2011) (TV-PG)
- Inuyasha (TV-14)
- JoJo's Bizarre Adventure: Diamond Is Unbreakable (TV-14)
- K: Return of Kings (TV-14)
- Kekkaishi (TV-14)
- Kids on the Slope (TV-14)
- Magi: The Kingdom of Magic (TV-14)
- MÄR (TV-PG)^{†}
- Mega Man Star Force (TV-PG)
- Moribito: Guardian of the Spirit (TV-14)
- Nana (TV-MA)
- Naruto (TV-PG)
- Neuro: Supernatural Detective (TV-MA)
- One Piece (TV-14)
- One-Punch Man (TV-PG)
- Puella Magi Madoka Magica (TV-14)
- Ranma ½ (TV-14)
- Reborn! (TV-14)
- Revolutionary Girl Utena (TV-14)
- Strawberry 100% (TV-MA)^{†}
- Terra Formars: Revenge (TV-14)
- The Prince of Tennis (TV-G)
- Ultra Maniac (TV-PG)
- Vampire Knight (TV-14)
  - Vampire Knight Guilty (TV-14)^{†}

=== Movies ===
- Appleseed (R)^{†}
- Berserk Golden Age Arc I: The Egg of the King (TV-MA)
- Berserk Golden Age Arc II: The Battle for Doldrey (TV-MA)
- Berserk Golden Age Arc III: The Descent (TV-MA)
- Bleach: Fade to Black (TV-14)
- Bleach: Hell Verse (TV-14)
- Bleach: Memories of Nobody (TV-14)^{†}
- Bleach: The DiamondDust Rebellion (TV-14)^{†}
- Eagle's Claw (TV-14)^{†}
- Fists and Guts (TV-14)^{†}
- Gintama: The Movie (TV-14)
- Initial D (TV-14)^{†}
- Inuyasha the Movie: Affections Touching Across Time (TV-14)
- Inuyasha the Movie: Fire on the Mystic Island (TV-14)
- Inuyasha the Movie: Swords of an Honorable Ruler (TV-14)
- Inuyasha the Movie: The Castle Beyond the Looking Glass (TV-14)
- K: Missing Kings (TV-14)^{†}
- Naruto Shippuden the Movie (TV-14)
- Naruto Shippuden the Movie: Bonds (TV-14)
- Naruto Shippuden the Movie: The Lost Tower (TV-14)
- Naruto Shippuden the Movie: The Will of Fire (TV-14)
- Naruto the Movie: Blood Prison (TV-14)
- Naruto the Movie: Guardians of the Crescent Moon Kingdom (TV-14)
- Naruto the Movie: Legend of the Stone of Gelel (TV-14)
- Naruto the Movie: Ninja Clash in the Land of Snow (TV-14)
- Tai Seng Entertainment movies
- Tiger & Bunny: The Beginning (TV-14)^{†}

=== Live Events ===
- CHIKARA (Former)
