= Masukawa =

Masukawa (written: 益川) is a Japanese surname. Notable people with the surname include:

- Takahiro Masukawa (増川 隆洋, born 1979), Japanese footballer
- Toshihide Masukawa (益川 敏英, born 1940), Japanese theoretical physicist
- Yōichi Masukawa (増川 洋一, born 1978), Japanese voice actor
