= Debi Mae West =

American voice actress

- Born: Debbie May West; Los Angeles, California, U.S.
- Other names: Eid Lakis; Mae Zalder; Andi Rich
- Occupations: Voice actress; singer; producer
- Years active: 1993–present
- Website: debimaewest.com

Debi Mae West is an American voice actress for popular radio, television, animation, and video games. In 2008, she won a Spike Video Game Award for voicing Meryl Silverburgh in Metal Gear and Tsunade in Naruto. From 1999 to 2002, she was a featured performer on Joe Frank's radio programs.

== Filmography ==
=== Anime series ===
List of dubbing performances in anime series
Year	Title	Role	Notes	Source
2003	Zatch Bell!	Baransha; Hideaki; Reycom	English dub	
2004	Naruto	Tsunade / Old woman	English dub	
2004	Zatch Bell! Season 2	Baransha	Episode: Battle in the Park: Zatch vs. Kiyo!?	
2004	Naruto – Konoha Annual Sports Festival	Tsunade	English dub	
2007	Naruto Shippuden	Tsunade	English dub	
2007	Bleach Season 3	Centipede Hollow	Episode: The Reviving Lion	
2007	Naruto – Mission: Protect the Waterfall Village!	Himatsu		
2008	Bleach	Hisana Kuchiki	Episode: Gather Together! Group of the Strongest Shinigami!	
2008	Metal Gear Solid: Digital Graphic Novel	Meryl Silverburgh	English version	
2008	Digimon Data Squad	Marcus Damon (Young)	Episode: The Royal Knights Assemble!	
2018	Boruto: Naruto Next Generations	Tsunade	English version	
2019	Sailor Moon Sailor Stars	Sailor Lead Crow / Akane Karasuma	English dub	

=== Animated shows ===
List of voice performances in animation shows
Year	Title	Role(s)	Notes
1997	101 Dalmatians: The Series	Lucky	(replacing Pamela Adlon)
1998	Superman: The Animated Series	Billy	Episode: Where There's Smoke
1999	Johnny Bravo	Doctor Babe / Soldier Babe #2 / Cave Babe / Muskrat	Additional voices
2000	Max Steel Season 2	Kat	Episode: Amazon
2001	The Angry Beavers	Termite Queen	Bomb / Queen
2002	Max Steel Season 3	Kat	Episode: Deep Cover
2004	Harvey Birdman, Attorney at Law	Gigi / Gleek	Season 2 Episodes 2 and 7
2005	Harvey Birdman, Attorney at Law Season 3	Gigi / Spanish Woman	Episode: "Mindless"
2005	Higglytown Heroes	Lighthouse Keeper Hero	
2006	Drawn Together	Vajoana	Season 2 Episode: 14
2007	Higglytown Heroes Season 3	Physical Therapist Hero	Season 3 Episode: 3
2015	VeggieTales	Chili Pepper	Episode: Are You My Neighbor?

=== Film roles ===
List of voice performances in direct-to-video and television films
Year	Title	Role	Notes	Source
1998	The Secret of NIMH 2: Timmy to the Rescue	Mrs. Brisby		
2003	Boyz Up Unauthorized	Debi West	Band Pump	
2005	Digimon Frontier: Island of Lost Digimon	Kotemon	English dub	
2005	Adjusting Arbie	Louis	Short film	
2006	Queer Duck: The Movie	Joan Rivers	Additional voices	
2006	Naruto the Movie: Guardians of the Crescent Moon Kingdom	Tsunade	English version	
2007	Highlander: The Search for Vengeance	Dahlia	(credited as Eid Lakis)	
2007	Naruto Shippuden the Movie	Tsunade	English dub	
2008	Naruto Shippuden the Movie: Bonds	Tsunade	English dub	
2010	Despicable Me	Office receptionist	Additional voices	
2010	Naruto Shippuden the Movie: The Lost Tower	Tsunade	Funimation dub	
2011	Naruto the Movie: Blood Prison	Tsunade / The Fifth Hokage		
2012	Road to Ninja: Naruto the Movie	Tsunade		
2012	Elemental	Visitor	Additional voices	
2012	Naruto Shippuden the Movie: The Will of Fire	Tsunade	English version	
2013	Veritas	Jeanine	Short film	
2014	The Last: Naruto the Movie	Tsunade / Akane		
2019	Weekly Distractions	Dehlilah		
2024	Sailor Moon Cosmos	Akane Karasuma / Sailor Lead Crow	Viz dub	

=== Video game roles ===
List of voice performances in video games
Year	Title	Role	Notes	Source
1998	Metal Gear Solid	Meryl Silverburgh	English	
1999	Metal Gear Solid: Integral	Meryl Silverburgh	Credited as Mae Zalder	
1999	Metal Gear Solid: VR Missions	Meryl Silverburgh	PlayStation	
2000	Tenchu 2: Birth of the Stealth Assassins	Ayame	PlayStation	
2000	Star Wars: Force Commander	Troop Carrier Driver / Rebel Dignitary 2 / Rebel Interface	PC	
2002	Ty the Tasmanian Tiger	Sheila the Koala	PlayStation 2	
2003	Tales of Symphonia	Sephie	Various	
2003	Evil Dead: A Fistful of Boomstick	Scared lady / Young girl	Additional voices	
2003	True Crime: Streets of LA	Stripper / Club girl	Additional voices	
2003	Naruto: The Lost Story - Mission: Protect the Waterfall Village	Tsunade		
2003	Warcraft III: The Frozen Throne	Maiev Shadowsong / Female Night Elf	PC	
2003	Alter Echo	Arana	PlayStation 2	
2004	Naruto: Ultimate Ninja 2	Tsunade	English version	
2004	The Chronicles of Riddick: Escape from Butcher Bay	Computer Voice / Elevator Voice / Pilot	PC	
2004	The SpongeBob SquarePants Movie	Fish girl / Little fish	Additional voices	
2004	EverQuest II	Rachele Clothspinner / Ass. D'Verin / Daisy Winterhope / Lady Vivianne Ironforge	PC	
2004	Shark Tale	Tenant Fish	Additional voices	
2004	Ty the Tasmanian Tiger 2: Bush Rescue	Birrel / Orchid / Sheila		
2004	World of Warcraft	Female Night Elf	PC	
2004	Metal Gear Solid: The Twin Snakes	Meryl Silverburgh		
2004	Vampire: The Masquerade – Bloodlines	Bum / Hannah / Jezebel Locke	Additional voices	
2005	Ty the Tasmanian Tiger 3: Night of the Quinkan	Shazza		
2005	Predator: Concrete Jungle	Scared lady / Running girl	Additional voices	
2005	Tom Clancy's Rainbow Six: Lockdown	Ayana Yacoby	PlayStation 2	
2005	Steambot Chronicles	Technician girl	Additional voices	
2005	Evil Dead: Regeneration	Necromancer Queen / Female Deadite 1		
2005	ATV Offroad Fury: Blazin' Trails	Announcer	PlayStation Portable	
2005	Dungeons & Dragons: Dragonshard	Villager / Kind lady	Various voices	
2005	Metal Gear Solid: Digital Graphic Novel	Meryl Silverburgh	Digital Comic	
2005	Neopets: The Darkest Faerie	Patricia		
2005	Tekken 5	Christie Monteiro (Cutscenes Voice)	PlayStation 2	
2005	Zatch Bell! Mamodo Fury	Baransha / Reycom	PlayStation 2	
2005	Tekken 5: Dark Resurrection	Christie Monteiro	(Cutscenes Voice)	
2006	Dirge of Cerberus: Final Fantasy VII	Incidental characters	PlayStation 2	
2006	Naruto: Uzumaki Chronicles 2	Tsunade / The Fifth Hokage	PlayStation 2	
2006	ATV Offroad Fury 4	Racer	PlayStation 2	
2006	Scarface: The World Is Yours	Business Lady	Additional voices	
2007	Naruto: Ultimate Ninja Heroes	Tsunade	English version	
2007	Spider-Man 3	Civilians / High School Girl	Additional voices	
2007	Naruto: Clash of Ninja Revolution	Tsunade	D3 Publisher	
2007	World of Warcraft: The Burning Crusade	Maiev Shadowsong	PC	
2007	God of War II	Atropos / Persephone	Credited as Debbie Maewest	
2008	Naruto: The Broken Bond	Tsunade	Xbox 360	
2008	Rise of the Argonauts	Medusa / Greek girl / Wealthy citizens	Various voices	
2008	Harvey Birdman: Attorney at Law	Gigi	PlayStation 2	
2008	Metal Gear Solid 4: Guns of the Patriots	Meryl Silverburgh		
2009	Leisure Suit Larry: Box Office Bust	Assorted Characters	PlayStation 3	
2009	Naruto Shippuden - Ninja Council 4	Tsunade	English version	
2009	Naruto Shippuden: Legends: Akatsuki Rising	Tsunade	PlayStation Portable	
2009	Naruto Shippûden: Clash of Ninja Revolution 3	Tsunade	English version	
2009	Naruto Shippûden: Dragon Blade Chronicles	Tsunade	Wii	
2009	Naruto Shippûden: Ultimate Ninja Heroes 3	Tsunade	PlayStation Portable	
2010	Blade Kitten	Terra-Li	Additional voices	
2010	Naruto Shippuden: Ultimate Ninja Storm 2	Tsunade	Xbox 360	
2010	Lost Planet 2	VS Computer Voice	Various	
2011	Saints Row: The Third	Pedestrian / Characters	Various voices	
2012	Naruto Shippuden: Ultimate Ninja Storm Generations	Tsunade	PlayStation 3	
2013	Saints Row IV	The Voices of Virtual Steelport	PlayStation 4	
2013	Naruto Shippuden: Ultimate Ninja Storm 3	Tsunade	English version, also in Full Burst	
2013	God of War: Ascension	Tisiphone / Bliss Whore / Civilian	PlayStation 3	
2014	Naruto Shippuden: Ultimate Ninja Storm Revolution	Tsunade	Xbox 360	
2014	Hearthstone: Heroes of Warcraft	Maiev Shadowsong	PC	
2015	Heroes of the Storm	Maiev Shadowsong	PC	
2016	World of Warcraft: Legion	Maiev Shadowsong	PC	
2016	Naruto Shippuden: Ultimate Ninja Storm 4	Tsunade	with Road to Boruto	
2018	Fallout 76: Wastelanders	Settlers	PlayStation 5	
2018	World of Warcraft: Battle for Azeroth	Maiev Shadowsong	PC	
2022	World of Warcraft: Dragonflight	Maiev Shadowsong	PC	
2023	Naruto x Boruto: Ultimate Ninja Storm Connections	Tsunade	PlayStation 5	
2023	Ty the Tasmanian Tiger 4	Shazza the Dingo	Nintendo Switch	

=== Narrator ===
Year	Title	Role	Notes
2026	Animals, They're Just Like Us!	Narrator	3 episodes

=== Producer ===
Year	Title	Role	Notes
2007	Angel's Nest	Producer	Field Producer

== Awards and nominations ==
Year	Award	Category	Nominated Work	Result	Ref.
2008	Spike Video Game Awards	Best Female Voice	Metal Gear Solid 4: Guns of the Patriots	Won	
2015	Behind the Voice Actors Awards	Best Female Vocal Performance in an Anime Feature Film/Special in a Supporting Role	Naruto the Movie: Blood Prison	Nominated	
2019	Society of Voice Arts and Sciences Awards	Best Voice Actress	Buzzr Game Show Network	Nominated	
2025	Emmy Awards	Sports Emmy Awards	Outstanding Live Special Presentation in 2024 Paris Olympic Games	Won	
