= Kakashi Hatake =

Naruto character

- Naruto, Naruto Shippuden & Boruto character
- Kakashi Hatake by Masashi Kishimoto
- First appearance: Naruto chapter 3: Enter Sasuke! (1999)
- Created by: Masashi Kishimoto
- Portrayed by: Charles Melton (live-action film)
- Voiced by: Japanese; Kazuhiko Inoue; Mutsumi Tamura (young); English; Dave Wittenberg; Kyle Hebert (Rock Lee & His Ninja Pals)

Kakashi Hatake (Japanese: はたけ カカシ, Hepburn: Hatake Kakashi) (Note: The English manga published by VIZ Media uses the Japanese naming order, surname before given name, and so Kakashi's name is Hatake Kakashi in the English manga. Other English adaptations use the Western order, that is surname after given name.) is a fictional character and one of the main protagonists in the Naruto manga and anime series created by Masashi Kishimoto. In the story, Kakashi is the teacher of Team 7, consisting of the series' primary characters, Naruto Uzumaki, Sasuke Uchiha, and Sakura Haruno. Kakashi's past has been extensively explored in the series, resulting in a gaiden being devoted to his past experiences. Kakashi has appeared in several pieces of Naruto media, the featured films in the series, the original video animations, and the video games.

He was originally created by Kishimoto to be an Uchiha, but the author decided to avoid that. Instead, he made him more generous to calm his students in difficult situations to the point of giving him feminine traits. Kakashi's design gave Kishimoto difficulties showing his emotions as a result of having most of his face covered. For the anime series, he is voiced by Kazuhiko Inoue in Japanese and Dave Wittenberg in the English dub.

Numerous anime and manga publications have praised and criticized Kakashi's character. Although he has been noted to be an echo of similar detached shōnen manga characters, the duality of Kakashi's apathetic and serious sides have been praised. Kakashi has been highly popular with the Naruto reader base, placing high in several popularity polls. Merchandise based on Kakashi has also been released, including key chains and plush dolls.

== Creation ==
Masashi Kishimoto originally intended for Kakashi to debut in the second chapter of the Naruto manga, appearing prior to the other members of Team 7. This Kakashi was designed as a laid back but very skilled ninja that ended his sentences with the polite "de gozaru" in the Japanese versions of the series. After speaking with his editor, Kishimoto pushed this debut back, allowing him to better develop Kakashi and the rest of Team 7. Despite this, Kakashi retains many of his original personality traits, being easygoing, unfazed by the actions of others, and eyes appearing to be half-asleep. Kishimoto feels that this makes Kakashi a compelling leader and helps to keep the diverse members of Team 7 unified. Early in the making of the series, Kakashi was designed as a samurai but he was not sure what the character would do in the manga. Thinking about how the protagonists' teacher would behave, Kishimoto envisioned him as a rude adult. However, he was not happy with this type of personality so he rewrote it to a more laid back person. He found this portrayal funny but still made him hot-blooded for serious situations. As the manga continued, he changed his speech pattern and gave it a laid back touch, with kindness and a woman-like mien - at least, the Japanese idea thereof. There was no model for Kakashi; Kishimoto wanted to write a calm teacher who would help his students in complicated situations.

Because he acts as a link between the other main characters of the series, Kakashi is rarely featured prominently in promotional artwork, instead appearing in the background while his students are the focus. In an interview in Shōnen Jump's, Kishimoto said that if he were to make an extra story from the manga with a different character, such character would be Kakashi. In early 2014, Kishimoto commented he wanted to reveal Kakashi's face but was not sure whether it would be in the manga or an upcoming movie. The Raikiri, one of Kakashi's most common techniques, had a different name, but the author forgot it. Nevertheless, he found the name Raikiri fitting for this lightning-based technique. Kakashi's Sharingan (写輪眼; lit. "Copy Wheel Eye", English manga: "Mirror Wheel Eye") was introduced to give the character mystery as only members from the Uchiha clan could possess it. By chapter 16 of the manga, Kishimoto had already decided how Kakashi obtained the Sharingan. He also added that Kakashi's face was difficult to draw since it is covered by a mask. In April 2015, Kishimoto revealed Kakashi's face for the first time during an exhibition.

When deciding upon Kakashi's name, Kishimoto considered a number of possibilities: Kuwa (クワ, "hoe"), Kama (カマ, "scythe"), Botan (ボタン, "peony"), Enoki (エノキ, a nettle tree), and Kakashi (カカシ, "scarecrow"). He eventually decided upon Kakashi, and remains glad that he did to this day. In keeping with the meaning of his name, scarecrows are occasionally used to represent Kakashi; Naruto, for example, uses a scarecrow that is dressed like Kakashi to help him train for a combat test between the two. Likewise, scarecrows are at times added to the background of scenes in which Kakashi appears, as is the case with the cover of the Naruto manga volume three.

In animated versions of the manga, Kakashi has been voiced by Kazuhiko Inoue in Japanese. Inoue was surprised about Kakashi's popularity within the Naruto fans and expected people to continue supporting him. In an interview, Dave Wittenberg, who does the voice acting for Kakashi in the English dub, comments that he feels he is similar to the character since he tends to have one eye open at a time and he becomes angry if he is interrupted while reading. He also added that what he likes most about Kakashi is his relation with his students, noting him to be "a very nice person".

== Appearances ==
=== In Naruto ===
Kakashi using Lightning Blade

Kakashi Hatake is introduced as the Jonin (elite ninja) leader in charge of Team 7, a new ninja team including Naruto Uzumaki, Sasuke Uchiha and Sakura Haruno. He first appears as a carefree character and tends to lose track of time, being frequently late to his appointments as a result. However, when testing his students, Kakashi reveals himself as a strong opponent to the point of fighting while reading Make Out (イチャイチャ, Icha Icha) series of erotic novels. Kakashi is renowned throughout the Naruto world for the use of his Sharingan, which he received from his teammate Obito Uchiha, and is revered as the ninja who has copied over a thousand jutsus, earning him the moniker "Copy Ninja Kakashi" (コピー忍者のカカシ, Kopī Ninja no Kakashi) and "Kakashi of the Sharingan" (写輪眼のカカシ, Sharingan no Kakashi). The Sharingan grants him the ability to mimic the movements and jutsu of others. Although most of Kakashi's abilities were acquired with his Sharingan, he also invented the Chidori (千鳥; lit. "One Thousand Birds") and its Lightning Blade variation, a collection of lightning chakra in one's hand that uses the Sharingan's visual ability to lock onto a target. When first forming Team 7, Kakashi does not take them as his students until instilling in them the concept of teamwork even if they have to break the rules he gave them. Kakashi continues to further this philosophy for the duration of Part I upon Sasuke Uchiha but is unable to get through to him before the latter's defection from Konoha. Kakashi also reluctantly participates in various challenges by his childhood friend Might Guy who considers Kakashi his rival.

Kakashi's background is explored in Kakashi Gaiden, a six chapter series that divides the gap between Part I and II of the manga. Kakashi is the son of Sakumo Hatake, one of the most powerful shinobi Konoha ever produced, renowned throughout the ninja world as "White Fang of the Leaf". Kakashi was himself a child prodigy and, during the ninja academy years, was hailed as the best of his generation. Following his father's suicide due to intense social pressure after a devastating failed mission where Sakumo prioritised his comrades over the mission, Kakashi adopted the philosophy that the success of a mission must always come first, over the welfare of his comrades. Kakashi is assigned by his teacher, Minato Namikaze, to lead a mission that would turn the current war in Konoha's favor. When his teammate, Rin Nohara, is captured by ninjas of the Hidden Stone Village or Iwagakure, his other teammate, Obito Uchiha, convinces him to rescue her. After finding Rin, an enemy-induced cave-in crushed Obito's right half. As his dying wish, Obito has Rin implant his newly acquired Sharingan into Kakashi's freshly damaged eye socket as a parting gift. His new eye in place, Kakashi flees with Rin as the cave collapses, completing their mission. Shortly after this event, Kakashi has to rescue Rin, who is kidnapped by ninjas of the Hidden Mist Village or Kirigakure, again; however, he learns that those Hidden Mist ninjas, under the influence of Madara Uchiha, have made Rin the host of the Three Tails, Isobu. Rin requests Kakashi kill her so she may not be used as part of a Trojan Horse scheme against Konoha, but Kakashi is reluctant. She eventually forces herself on the way of Kakashi's Lightning Blade that he originally directed at the pursuing Hidden Mist ninja, killing her. An anime exclusive flashback arc in Naruto Shippuden covered Kakashi coping with what he endured during the war as he becomes an ANBU operative during Minato's time as Hokage and influences Yamato into becoming a member of the ANBU as well. Once relieved of duty in the ANBU, Kakashi becomes a Genin instructor prior to the events of Part I.

Kakashi's Mangekyo Sharingan

Two-and-a-half years later in Part II, Kakashi forms Team Kakashi, with new arrival of Sai. During the gap in time, Kakashi hones the Mangekyo Sharingan (万華鏡写輪眼, Mangekyō Sharingan; lit. "Kaleidoscope Copy Wheel Eye") gained from Rin's death to master the Kamui ability that allows him to send any targeted object to another dimension. Because his students are now capable of taking care of themselves, Kakashi takes a more active role in battles, particularly those with the criminal organization Akatsuki where Kakashi, along with other Hidden Leaf ninjas, battled Hidan and Kakuzu, emerging as victorious. When the Akatsuki leader, Pain, invades Konoha, Kakashi engages him in battle, and dies from exhausting all his energy. However, after his confrontation with Naruto, Pain decides to use all of his remaining power to revive all those killed in the battle at Konoha, including Kakashi. Following a brief encounter with Tobi, the Akatsuki's true leader, Kakashi becomes one of the generals to participate in the Fourth Great Ninja War against Tobi's army. As Naruto and Killer Bee continue to battle against Tobi and his forces, Kakashi and Guy arrive to join the fight. During the encounter, Kakashi learns that Tobi is Obito, who in fact had survived his apparent death and had committed to destroying the world order that allowed their friend's demise; Kakashi is left greatly stunned and horrified at Obito's actions. Despite the guilt for what Obito has become, Kakashi is encouraged by Naruto to continue fighting and the battle ends with Kakashi impaling Obito. When Naruto is nearly killed by Madara, Kakashi and a redeemed Obito join forces to protect Naruto by spiriting him off into the latter's dimension to be healed. After Kakashi loses his Sharingan to Madara, Naruto uses his new-found abilities to restore his original eye. When Madara succeeds in casting the Infinite Tsukiyomi Kakashi is one of the few people protected from its effects. During the fight against Kaguya Ōtsutsuki, Obito sacrifices himself to save Kakashi; Kakashi is then infused by the chakra-based spirit of Obito and briefly gains his friend's full Sharingan abilities to help his team defeat Kaguya. Following the conclusion of the war, Kakashi is named by Tsunade as her successor, the Sixth Hokage, with his first act being to pardon Sasuke for his crimes. He holds this title for many years before finally passing it to Naruto, as revealed in the epilogue.

=== Appearances in other media ===
Kakashi has made appearances outside of the Naruto anime and manga. He is in ten of the feature films in the series: in the first movie he battles Nadare Rouga and later defeats him, in the third Kakashi battles the hired ninja Ishidate, whom he fights to a standstill, and he later acts as a distraction for his team by battling the minister Shabadaba's soldiers, in the fourth Kakashi fights against a large group of stone soldiers, in the fifth, Kakashi is sent alongside Shikamaru Nara, Sai, and Shino Aburame to investigate the base of the Sky Country, in the sixth, when the threat of war loom over Konoha from the other ninja villages, Kakashi is sent on a suicide mission to defeat a rogue ninja named Hiruko who wants his Sharingan, however, Naruto and Sakura ultimately prevent their teacher from throwing his life away, in the seventh movie, in which a younger Kakashi is a member of a team composed of himself, Minato, Shibi Aburame and Chōza Akimichi to stop Anrokuzan with the help of a time displaced Naruto. In the eighth, he serves as part of the plan to lock Naruto in prison before subsequently helping to break him out, and in the ninth, an alternate version of him with an identical appearance to Guy is shown, to Sakura's dismay. Canonically, in the tenth, he appears as the Sixth Hokage, helping the village while Naruto is away, and in the eleventh he makes a cameo appearance waking up a drowsy Naruto (who is now the Seventh Hokage) shadow clone by tapping him on the head with a book.

Kakashi is also present in all four of the original video animations produced for the series, helping Naruto and Konohamaru Sarutobi to find a four leaf clover in the first original video animation, joining his team in escorting a ninja named Shibuki to his village in the second, participating in a tournament in the third, and working with Team 7 in the fourth one. A light novel titled Kakashi Hiden: Lightning in the Icy Sky, written by Akira Higashiyama and illustrated by Kishimoto, focuses on the early days of Kakashi's appointment as the Sixth Hokage, in which he has to stop a terror plan conducted by a pair of Kirigakure ninja, who plan to take control of a newly unveiled airborne ship to stage a jailbreak of a notorious criminal, in the process learning about the pair's tragic reason for doing so. In the anime sequel of Naruto Shippuden, Boruto: Naruto Next Generations, Kakashi makes minor appearances until testing the young main characters during a test to see if they can become ninjas.

Kakashi is a playable character in all Naruto video games, including the Clash of Ninja series and the Ultimate Ninja series. In some games, he is able to use his Sharingan in combat, often as a different character with the ability activated, and in other games, he is available in his ANBU attire. An upcoming light novel titled Kakashi Hiden will focus on the character.

== Reception ==
Kakashi has ranked within the top five characters in every official Weekly Shōnen Jump popularity poll, acquiring the first position, as the most popular character, several times. In the most recent poll, he ranked third, with Naruto Uzumaki and Sasuke Uchiha acquiring the top two positions. In the Anime Awards 2006 from About.com, Kakashi won in the category "Best Supporting Male Character". He was also a nominee during the first "Nickelodeon Magazine Comics Awards" in the category "Best Hair in Comics", losing to Calvin from Calvin and Hobbes. In an Oricon poll of "manga master", Kakashi was third with 8.4% of the votes. Merchandise based on Kakashi's character has also been released, including plush dolls, key chains, and a limited edition figurine.

Several publications for manga, anime, video games, and other related media have provided praise and criticism on Kakashi's character. Christopher A. Born regards Kakashi's teaching of Team 7 to work as a team, even if they have to break the rules, to be reinforcing the Confucian values of the "importance of benevolence and reciprocity". IGN noted the duality of Kakashi's serious persona in combat and his laid back, apathetic countenance when dealing with his students, but accepted that he is one of the most popular characters in the series. They also commented that Kakashi is one of the more popular characters they have seen cosplayed at anime conventions. Active Anime celebrated Kakashi's abilities, noting that he fell into the overall theme of characters hiding detailed personalities and secrets. T.H.E.M. Anime Reviews derided Kakashi as a stereotypical "Man of Mystery" seen in other shōnen manga, but praised him as being "much more interesting" than the three main characters, and felt that for all intents and purposes, the show could be renamed simply "Kakashi". Mania Entertainment's Dani Moure likes how Kakashi fits into Team 7 because he is a "hilarious character in that sometimes he doesn't seem all that bothered about things and yet is so masterful of his craft." Chris Beveridge from the site stated that Kakashi is his favorite character from the series because of his personality and praised his fight against Pain, and that after its ending, the character gets "a very humanizing moment", making the episode from the battle stand out. Manga author Yoshihiro Togashi found Kakashi's first battle against his students as one of the first series' moments that impressed him due to how the difference in strength between them was shown by just making Kakashi read a book during the fight. IGN ranked him as the 15th greatest anime character of all time, saying that "He's a complex character, with an iconic character design and a laid back attitude that just exudes cool." Amy McNulty from Anime News Network highly praised Kakashi's fight against Obito Uchiha due to its animation and the references to the two fighters' childhoods. In 2014, IGN listed him as the best Naruto character when the series ended.

Kakashi's portrayal in Boruto: Naruto Next Generations attracted negative responses by Anime News Network. His rude demeanor during the ninja graduation exams was criticized as the reviewer noted Boruto did not deserve such poor treatment. In a latter review, ANN criticized the poor advice he gives to Sasuke when his former student is trying to bond with his daughter, Sarada Uchiha, making it unsuitable comic relief.
