= Sakura Haruno =

Fictional character from Naruto

- Naruto character
- Sakura Haruno by Masashi Kishimoto as seen in Part I
- First appearance: Naruto chapter 3: Enter Sasuke! (1999)
- Created by: Masashi Kishimoto
- Voiced by: Japanese; Chie Nakamura; English; Kate Higgins; Dorothy Elias-Fahn (Rock Lee & His Ninja Pals)

In-universe information
- Family: Kizashi Haruno (father); Mebuki Haruno (mother)
- Spouse: Sasuke Uchiha (husband)
- Children: Sarada Uchiha (daughter)
- Relatives: Itachi Uchiha (brother-in-law, deceased)
- Ninja rank: Genin in Part I Chunin in Part II; Jonin in The Last: Naruto the Movie
- Ninja team: Team 7/Team Kakashi

Sakura Uchiha (Japanese: 春野 サクラ, Hepburn: Uchiha Sakura) (née Haruno) (Note: The English manga published by VIZ Media uses the Japanese naming order, surname before given name, and so Sakura's name is Haruno Sakura in the English manga. Other English adaptations use the Western order, that is surname after given name.) is a major character in the Naruto manga and anime series created by Masashi Kishimoto. Sakura is a beautiful girl with pink hair and green eyes. She is depicted as a kunoichi affiliated with Konohagakure (木ノ葉隠れの里; English version: "Hidden Leaf Village") and a part of Team 7, which consists of herself, Naruto Uzumaki, Sasuke Uchiha, and their sensei Kakashi Hatake. Besides the main series, Sakura has appeared in several pieces of the Naruto media, most notably the spin-off Naruto: The Seventh Hokage and the Scarlet Spring (2015) and the sequel Boruto: Naruto Next Generations (2016) where she married Sasuke Uchiha and is the mother of their daughter, Sarada Uchiha.

Sakura is depicted as an innocent girl who does not share the same tragic backstories as her teammates, though she was bullied throughout her youth. She initially has an infatuation for Sasuke, and she is not ambitious. Her only ambition at this point was becoming Sasuke's girlfriend. By contrast, she is dismissive to her less-skilled teammate Naruto Uzumaki despite being Naruto's initial love interest. Over the course of the series, as Sasuke eventually leaves the village, Sakura begins to adopt a singularly-driven persona. She asked Naruto to find Sasuke and thought only about Sasuke. She becomes a medical ninja while apprenticed under the Fifth Hokage, Tsunade, and she eventually becomes friendly and even protective of Naruto as his life becomes increasingly at risk.

Sakura serves as the series's female lead, although she was not immediately intended for the role. Kishimoto had difficulty drawing her character, resulting in Kishimoto inadvertently emphasizing certain parts of her appearance, including her large forehead which was written into her character. In order to make the character more appealing in the second part of the series, Kishimoto designed her costume in a way that makes her look more like a martial artist as well as more beautiful during later chapters. Chie Nakamura voices the character in the animated adaptations of the series, while Kate Higgins plays her in the English dub.

Numerous anime and manga publications have praised and criticized Sakura's character. She was initially noted to be a stereotypical shōnen character, representing a love interest for the protagonist, and was said to serve little purpose at the beginning of the series beyond being comic relief. Her emergence from this stereotype as the series progressed, thanks to her training with Tsunade, which leads her to develop her medical and combat skills, has been celebrated by many reviewers. Amongst the Naruto reader base, Sakura has been popular, placing high in some polls. Several pieces of merchandise have been released in Sakura's likeness, such as action figures and key chains.

== Creation and conception ==
Sakura's early design

Although Sakura Haruno is the most recurring female character in Naruto, Masashi Kishimoto did not originally intend for Sakura to be the heroine of the series. Kishimoto attributed this to him being unable to draw good heroine characters and fashioned Sakura as a girl who could not understand men, the best example of a heroine he could come up with. Sakura's creation is a result of Kishimoto's desire to make a somewhat irritating character who was well-intentioned. Despite these elements, Kishimoto is fond of Sakura, as he feels that many of her personality traits are common among all people, thus giving her a sense of real humanity. When asked in an interview if there was something about Sakura's background that had not been revealed, Kishimoto explained that he had never thought of that as Sakura is a "normal girl". Kishimoto has often been asked by readers about why he did not show Sakura's parents until the film Road to Ninja: Naruto the Movie. In response, he said this would not be entertaining as Sakura did not belong to any clan unlike other characters so her parents were civilians.

Sakura as she appears in Part II

When designing Sakura, Kishimoto focused on her silhouette and created a costume as simple as possible. This is a divergence from the other main characters of the series, whose costumes are very detailed. The leggings are the most notable aspect of her design, as they are meant to show that she is very active. At the start of the series, her leggings extended below her knees and closely resembled trousers. As Part I progressed, the leggings became increasingly shorter and tighter. Similar to his inexperience in drawing heroines, Kishimoto lacked the experience needed to make Sakura "cute" when he first began drawing her; although he implied that her appearance had become cuter since then, Kishimoto and much of the Naruto manga staff agreed that Sakura had been "far from cute" at the start of the series. In retrospective, he found Sakura one of the hardest characters to draw, alongside Sasuke Uchiha. Nonetheless, within the work, Sakura is depicted as a beauty and out of all the female characters, she has the most suitors. In volume 1, Naruto introduces her as a cute girl he is interested in, in Volume 5, Rock Lee falls in love with her at first sight and calls her an angel, in Volume 48, Inari mentions how beautiful she has become, and during the War arc, a shinobi from Iwagakure hands her a love letter. Moreover, in the Sasuke Retsuden spin-off, her beauty is mentioned several times. Kishimoto first planned Sasuke and Sakura's romance in the early production of Naruto. In regards to Sakura's feelings for Sasuke, Kishimoto tried to write them as realistic as possible but ended up getting complaints from young girls about her.

Sakura's most well-known physical characteristic is her broad forehead. Consequently, because of this Kishimoto at times focuses too much on drawing it in scenes or promotional artwork where Sakura is featured prominently. This results in her forehead appearing too large. When designing Sakura in her Part II appearance, Kishimoto decided to change her clothes to a more lively karate suit style. The upper part, though, still had a Chinaesque feeling to it, so as to make her more feminine. During Part II's last story arc, Kishimoto tried making Sakura look more beautiful, most notably when she joins Naruto and Sasuke in the final fight against the creature Ten-Tails. He mentions using Hollywood actresses as a reference to illustrate her as a beauty. Due to Sakura having little popularity within readers, Kishimoto decided that Hinata Hyuga, whom he acknowledged had more popularity, would take a more active role and become a heroine. Despite deciding that Naruto and Hinata would end up together since the early stages of the manga, Kishimoto thought it would be interesting to throw Sakura in the middle to form "a messy love triangle." Nevertheless, Kishimoto said romance was not what he wanted his series to focus on. In the middle of the manga's final arc, Sakura is given a love letter. The real reasons for this is that Kishimoto wanted to give the anime studio material to create animated only episodes.

During The Last, Kishimoto designed Sakura as an elegant and graceful beauty. He claims that she has become a "beautiful older sister type" and that even he was surprised by how beautiful she had become. He aimed to draw her with a "sense of transparency," meaning a refreshing and ethereal beauty.

In the animated versions of Naruto, Sakura was voiced by Chie Nakamura. Early in the first series, the actors were told by Kishimoto that Sakura would end up marrying Sasuke. Nonetheless, most of them started having doubts as during the first anime, Sasuke abandoned his teammates. As a result, by the second series, Nakamura was often asked by other people if her character would instead end up with Naruto. When Sakura married Sasuke in the end, Nakamura was happy because Sakura stayed true to her feelings. In an interview, Kate Higgins, who does the voice acting for Sakura in the English dub, remarked the development of Sakura in the series, stating that she turned into a more complex character as she became more sensitive and caring.

== Appearances ==
=== In Naruto ===
Sakura is a young ninja who is a part of Team 7 alongside Naruto Uzumaki and Sasuke Uchiha under the leadership of their sensei Kakashi Hatake. Within Sakura resides "Inner Sakura", a manifestation of her inner emotions; in addition to comic relief, Inner Sakura represents Sakura's actual opinion on things when she outwardly displays something opposite. As Sakura has a deep infatuation for Sasuke, many of her earlier appearances are dedicated to her continued effort to win his affection. She accompanies the rest of Team 7 during all of its early missions, though she does little to contribute to the battles that take place. Sakura lacks any unique traits that would set her apart from the rest of Team 7, although Kakashi notes that she has an excellent control over her chakra early in Part I. As a result, Sakura stays on the sidelines, content in allowing her teammates to protect her and defeat their opponents. During the Chunin Exams, when the rest of Team 7 is left in need of her protection, Sakura realizes that relying on others to fight her battles has been unwise. She resolves to better her ninja abilities from that point further, and she takes a more active role in Team 7's battles throughout the rest of the series. After Sasuke's defection from Konohagakure at the end of Part I, Naruto's failure to bring him back, and Sakura's inability to help either of them, she becomes Tsunade's apprentice so that she can do more for her teammates in the future. Since then, Sakura makes it her personal goal to bring Sasuke home.

After training under Tsunade for two-and-a-half years, Sakura acquires the ability to heal wounds, becoming one of the most experienced medical ninjas. In order to secure her survival to heal others, Sakura also develops superhuman strength by building up chakra in her fists; by storing a vast amount of Chakra in her body over 3 years, she awakens the Byakugō Seal, a jutsu considered to be the pinnacle of chakra control. Thanks to this, Sakura joins Team 7 as a medical ninja to save their ally Gaara from the criminal group Akatsuki. With help from the elder Chiyo, Sakura defeats the Akatsuki member Sasori, who gives her hints of Sasuke's whereabouts. The new member of Team 7, Sai, uses his intelligence to track Sasuke down, but once again they are unable to prevent him from escaping. While disappointed in their failure, Team 7 tries once again to find Sasuke, although after almost apprehending him they lose his trail and are forced to return home. As they search for Sasuke, Sakura learns of the various hardships Naruto faces because of the Nine-Tailed Demon Fox creature sealed inside him, which is being pursued by the Akatsuki. Saddened by the impact both forces have had on his life, Sakura becomes protective of Naruto and tries to do whatever she can to help him overcome these obstacles. Sakura later resolves to kill Sasuke after understanding he is becoming a menace to the villages. However, when she fails to do it, Naruto decides to settle things with Sasuke himself. When a war against the remaining Akatsuki is announced, Sakura participates as a medical ninja. She later moves to the fighting side when the Ten-Tails creature is released, and she battles it alongside Naruto and Sasuke. After Sasuke is pardoned for his crimes, Sakura sees him off as he decides to travel the world in search for redemption and shows signs that he finally accepts her feelings for him; he pokes her forehead and thanks her right before his departure. In the epilogue, set years after the end of the Fourth Ninja War, it is shown that Sakura and Sasuke had married and had a daughter, Sarada Uchiha.

=== In other media ===
Sakura has made several appearances outside of the Naruto anime and manga. She is in all eleven feature films of the series: in the first film — Naruto the Movie: Ninja Clash in the Land of Snow (2004), she battles Mizore Fuyukuma and later defeats him; in the second — Naruto the Movie: Legend of the Stone of Gelel (2005), she helps Naruto and Shikamaru Nara in their battle against Haido and his subordinates; the third — Naruto the Movie: Guardians of the Crescent Moon Kingdom (2006) — has Sakura battling the hired ninja Karenbana, whom she defeats using her enhanced strength; in the fourth — Naruto Shippuden the Movie (2007), Sakura, Naruto, Rock Lee, and Neji Hyuga are assigned to escort the maiden Shion; in the fifth — Naruto Shippuden the Movie: Bonds (2008), Sakura is assigned alongside Naruto and Hinata Hyuga to help a girl, Amaru, and her sensei, Shinnō, return to their village while in the process learning of an upcoming invasion of the Sky Country; the sixth — Naruto Shippuden the Movie: The Will of Fire (2009) — has Sakura and Naruto desperately following and trying to bring back their sensei, Kakashi, who has gone on a suicide mission to prevent the Fourth Great Ninja World War; in the seventh — Naruto Shippuden the Movie: The Lost Tower (2010), Sakura and the rest of Team Kakashi are sent to capture a missing-nin, Mukade; in the eighth — Naruto the Movie: Blood Prison (2011), Sakura assists in the battle against the demon Satori who has been released from the Box of Enlightenment; in the ninth — Road to Ninja: Naruto the Movie (2012), Sakura and Naruto are transported to an illusion world by Obito Uchiha in which instead of Naruto's parents, Sakura's parents were the ones who sacrificed their lives in preventing the Nine-Tails from destroying Konohagakure and were thus deemed as the village's heroes; in the tenth — The Last: Naruto the Movie (2014), Sakura, in her young adult years, sets out alongside Naruto, Sai, Shikamaru, and Hinata to rescue a kidnapped Hanabi Hyuga, Hinata's younger sister; and finally, in the eleventh — Boruto: Naruto the Movie (2015), Sakura watches her daughter's participation in the Chunin Exams.

She is also present in all three of the original video animations produced for the series, helping Naruto and Konohamaru to find a four-leaf clover in the first original video animation, joining her team in escorting a ninja named Shibuki to his village and helping him fight the missing-nin that stole the village's "Hero's Water" in the second, and participating in a tournament in the third. A light novel titled Sakura Hiden: Thoughts of Love, Riding Upon a Spring Breeze (2015), written by Tomohito Ōsaki and illustrated by Kishimoto, focuses on Sakura sometime after the events of The Last: Naruto the Movie, where she, now a celebrated medical ninja who is in the middle of opening a new mental clinic with Ino Yamanaka, becomes worried when a conspiracy that threatens to destroy Konohagakure is using Sasuke as a scapegoat, potentially ruining his chance at redemption amongst the villagers. In Naruto: The Seventh Hokage and the Scarlet Spring (2015), Sasuke's travels keep him away from his family. As a result, his whereabouts become a touchy subject for Sakura, who assures Sarada over the years that Sasuke will return home once having completed his mission. After punching the ground in a fit of rage over Sarada asking if she and Sasuke are married, Sakura discovers her daughter has left the village in search of Sasuke. By the time she catches up to the two, they are in the presence of Shin Uchiha, whom Sakura attacks. Afterward, she is teleported away with him to his hideout, where she declines to assist him with her medical skills and pretends to be helpless in order to gain information on him. After Sakura battles Shin, she is rescued by her husband, and they return to the village following Shin's defeat. Soon after that, Sakura and Sarada see Sasuke off to his journey. Sakura later serves as a spectator for Sarada while she participates in the Chunin Exams and saves both herself and other onlookers from falling debris, afterward healing Hinata.

Sakura is a playable character in nearly all Naruto video games, including the Clash of Ninja series and the Ultimate Ninja series. In some games, she uses "Inner Sakura" in combat as well as numerous different genjutsu. Naruto Shippuden: Gekitou Ninja Taisen! EX (2007) marks the first appearance of Sakura in her Part II design in a video game, with the second one being Naruto Shippuden: Ultimate Ninja 4 (2007). Meanwhile, Naruto Shippuden: Ultimate Ninja Storm 4 (2016) marks the first appearance of Sakura post-Part II; specifically, her appearance in The Last: Naruto the Movie, set two years after chapter 699 of the manga.

== Reception ==
In the Weekly Shōnen Jump character popularity polls, Sakura had many times been placed in the top ten and reached the top five once; in the most recent poll, she was ranked twelfth. Numerous pieces of merchandise based on Sakura have been released, including action figures, key chains of her Part I (Naruto) and Part II (Naruto: Shippuden) appearances, and various character patches. In a poll from 2021, Sakura was voted as the 6th most popular character in Boruto: Naruto Next Generations. In 2023, in the first global poll, Sakura was found to be the franchise's third most popular character overall, behind Minato Namikaze and Itachi Uchiha, and the most popular female character.

Several manga, anime and video games publications and other related media have provided praise as well as criticism on Sakura's character. IGN writer A.E. Sparrow commented that every anime and manga benefited from a strong female presence that Sakura provided for the Naruto series, although characterizing her as "stereotypically girly". In a review of episode 110 of the anime, IGN celebrated the culmination of the development of Sakura's character throughout the series and the growing out of the "girly" personality. GameSpot said that Sakura's character had largely been used in the series as a form of comic relief and to often state the obvious. T.H.E.M. Anime Reviews considered Sakura to be a stereotypical echo of similar love interests of protagonists in other shōnen manga and that she was not likable. On the other hand, she was also regarded as "an interesting character to throw into the mix [of Naruto]" by Mania Entertainment's Dani Moure due to how her differences with Sasuke and Naruto helped to balance Team 7. In the book New Media Literacies and Participatory Popular Culture Across Borders, Amy A. Zenger wrote that Sasuke and Sakura's relationship was popular among fans of the series even at the time when the former had not yet reciprocated the latter's feelings.

The character's change in Part II (Naruto: Shippuden) has been praised by Anime News Network's Casey Brienza for being one of the most developed ones in the series, as she has become stronger than her Part I (Naruto) counterpart, which was considerably weaker than Naruto and Sasuke. This allows her to take a more active and appealing role in the series. Major praise has been given to her encounters with Sasori and Sasuke owing to her fighting skills and mature reactions, respectively. Sakura's love confession to Naruto in later parts of the series has been commented to be one of the deepest lines and parts of the story arc for bringing confusion in regard to whether her love confession claim was as serious as her intention to stop Naruto's suffering. It also came as a surprise as fans wondered what Sakura's real intention regarding Sasuke was, the latter having already become a dangerous criminal during such a time in the series. Jason Thompson believes Sakura's feelings were well-handled by Kishimoto. While disliking the romance between Sasuke and Sakura in the original series as she felt it was initially a crush on Sakura's part, Amy McNulty thought the spin-off manga Naruto: The Seventh Hokage and the Scarlet Spring helped to expand the bond between these two as well as their relationship with their daughter, Sarada. Sarah Nelkin of Anime Now praised Sakura's development across the series, mostly in late parts of the story due to how she turns into a stronger person as she grows up and especially when she becomes an adult.

Critic Yukari Fujimoto says that Sakura is an example of Naruto showing a conservative view of women. Ino, Sakura and Hinata place priority on love, treating it as more important than excelling as a ninja. Fujimoto states that during the ninja examinations, Sakura's climactic fight with Ino, her love rival, is conducted on a purely physical level, contrasting this level of skill with the supernatural abilities displayed by her male classmates at this point. When the medical ninja Tsunade is introduced, Sakura takes on a daughter-like role, learning to heal others from Tsunade's teaching, which Fujimoto regards as reinforcing a conservative idea of women — that women do not belong on the battlefield as warriors, only as nurses.
