= Rock Lee =

Fictional anime character from the series Naruto

- Naruto character
- Rock Lee by Masashi Kishimoto
- First appearance: Naruto chapter 36: Sakura's Depression
- Created by: Masashi Kishimoto
- Voiced by: Japanese; Yōichi Masukawa; English; Brian Donovan
- Notable relatives: Metal Lee (son)
- Marital Status: Married
- Ninja rank: Genin in Part I Chunin in Part II; Jonin in epilogue
- Ninja team: Team Guy

Rock Lee (Japanese: ロック・リー, Hepburn: Rokku Rī) is a fictional character in the anime and manga series Naruto and Naruto Shippuden created by Masashi Kishimoto. At first, Masashi designed Lee to symbolize human strength. In the anime and manga, Lee is a ninja affiliated with the Village Hidden in the Leaves or Konohagakure, and is a member of Team Guy, which consists of himself, Neji Hyuga, Tenten, and Might Guy—the team's leader. Unable to use most ninja techniques, Lee dedicates himself to using solely taijutsu, ninja techniques similar to martial arts. Lee dreams of becoming a "splendid ninja" despite his inabilities. Lee has appeared in several pieces of Naruto media, including the third and fourth featured films in the series, the third original video animation, and multiple video games.

Numerous anime and manga publications have commented on Lee's character. IGN compared Lee to Bruce Lee and Noel Gallagher, and Anime News Network called Lee the "goofiest looking character" in the series. Among the Naruto reader base, Lee has been popular, placing high in several popularity polls. Numerous pieces of merchandise have been released in Lee's likeness, including figurines and plush dolls.

== Creation and conception ==
In an interview in Weekly Shōnen Jump's Naruto Anime interview Episodes 1-37, Masashi Kishimoto stated that he enjoys drawing Lee more than any other character in the series. When designing Lee's appearance, Kishimoto intended to have Lee wield a variety of weapons, including nunchaku; however, due to time constraints while creating the series, he was unable to do so. Kishimoto's first editor, Kosuke Yahagi, originally drew the author a draft of Lee's appearance. While the design highly changed from its draft to the original one when Kishimoto designed it, Yahagi felt pleased because some parts were kept. Kishimoto has noted that he originally designed Lee to symbolize human weakness; Kishimoto's design of Sakura Haruno was also intended to carry the same symbolism. Kishimoto was surprised by Lee's popularity among fans. He intended to write more about him but the timing was never right. Due to the popularity Lee garnered over the course of the series, Kishimoto tends to place him toward the front of promotional artwork in which he appears.

In an interview, Brian Donovan, the voice actor for Rock Lee in the English adaptation of the anime, commented that he likes Lee because he felt he was attempting to be a "knight in shining armor but bumbling and stumbling at the same time".

== Appearances ==
=== In Naruto ===
When he opens the chakra gates, Lee's skin turns red and the power and speed of his taijutsu techniques are enhanced.

Rock Lee is a ninja from Konohagakure part of Team Guy, a four-man cell of ninja led by Might Guy. Inspired by Lee's determination to become stronger despite his inability to perform basic ninja techniques, Guy takes a personal interest in him, deciding to help him achieve his dream of becoming a powerful ninja by using only taijutsu that is primary hand-to-hand combat. This relationship with Guy causes Lee to acquire many of Guy's traits. Lee believes he can surpass the natural talents of others through hard work and passion; throughout the series, he attempts to surpass Neji Hyuga, who is labeled a "genius". Lee first appears in the series as a participant in the Chunin Exams, twice a year exams for ninja who wish to increase their rank. During the Chunin Exams, Lee battles Gaara, a ninja from the village of Sunagakure. In the fight, Lee opens the five of the eight chakra gates, limits on the body's ability to use chakra, using a forbidden technique known as the Hidden Lotus, increasing his natural abilities at the cost of his health. Despite his effort, Gaara cripples Lee by crushing his left arm and leg, injuring Lee to the point that he must abandon being a ninja.

When Tsunade, a Konohagakure medical ninja, returns to lead the village as the Fifth Hokage, she offers to operate on him. Despite the procedure's fifty percent chance of failure, Guy encourages Lee to have the operation. Ultimately, Lee undergoes the surgery, which succeeds in healing his arm and leg. Immediately after the operation, Lee follows a team of ninja led by Shikamaru Nara who attempt to stop Sasuke Uchiha from defecting from Konohagakure to the village of Otogakure. Lee battles the Otogakure ninja Kimimaro through using the Potion Punch (酔拳, Suiken; literally "Drunken Fist", English TV: "Loopy Fist") fighting style in which he becomes inebriated with unpredictable attacks. When Kimimaro is on the verge of defeating Lee, Gaara intervenes, continuing the battle.

In Part II, Lee obtains the rank of Chunin, and is dispatched with his team to help save Gaara following his abduction by the criminal organization Akatsuki. During the events of the Fourth Shinobi War Lee is assigned to the Third Division, Lee helps in fighting the Kabuto Yakushi's reanimated army and later aids Naruto Uzumaki in the fight against Obito Uchiha and Madara Uchiha. Years after the war, Lee marries an unknown woman and has a son named Metal Lee. In the epilogue, Lee is last seen many years later, training with his son. In Boruto: Naruto the Movie, Lee hosts the third stage of the Chunin Exam.

=== In other media ===
Lee has made several appearances outside of the Naruto anime and manga. In the third featured film in the series, Naruto the Movie 3: The Animal Riot of Crescent Moon Island, Lee acts as a member of Team 7 for the duration of the film. In the fourth film, which is set in Part II, Naruto Uzumaki, Sakura Haruno, Neji Hyuga, and Lee are assigned to escort the maiden Shion, who needs to perform a ritual to seal a demonic army. Lee also appears in the third original video animation, participating in a tournament.

Lee is a playable character in nearly every Naruto video game, including the Clash of Ninja series and the Ultimate Ninja series. In some games, he utilizes variations of his techniques not seen in the anime or manga. Naruto Shippūden: Gekitō Ninja Taisen! EX and Ultimate Ninja 4 marks his first appearance in video games set in Part II. Rock Lee is also the main character of a spin-off manga by Kenji Taira that follows his training in comical misadventures. The manga was adapted into an anime series titled Rock Lee and his Ninja Pals.

== Reception ==
Lee has ranked highly in the Shōnen Jump popularity polls for the series, initially continuously placing in the top ten and reaching fifth place once. In later polls, Lee lost his top ten status. Also, several pieces of merchandise based on Lee have also been released, including action figures of his Part I and Part II appearances, plush dolls, and keychains. My Hero Academia author Kōhei Horikoshi said that Rock Lee's inhability to use ninjutsu and instead use hand-to-hand combat made him highly stand out in the manga. He also praised how heroic is Rock Lee's portrayal in the Chunnin Exams when facing Orochimaru's underlings.

Several publications for manga, anime, video games, and other media have provided commentary on Lee's character. IGN's A.E. Sparrow called Lee one of his favorite characters in the series and compared his personality to that of Bruce Lee and Noel Gallagher. Fellow editor Ramsey Isler ranked him as the eight best character on the series and said he "was the true underdog of the series." Isler added, "Perhaps a little too intense, but always fiercely devoted to his cause, Rock Lee added all sorts of flavor to the series." However, Rock Lee's profile on IGN describes him as "kind of stiff" because of his very polite demeanor. Active Anime celebrated Lee's introduction in the series as a comedic relief to the growing tension of the story at that point. Anime Insider listed him in their top five list for "pure-hearted heroes" from anime and manga publications, ranking at number five. Insider praised him for "never [giving] up, even in the face of people with actual ninja powers."

Anime News Network referred to Lee as the "star of [the Chunin Exam arc]", and claimed that he "almost single-handedly rescues this arc from being tossed into the 'entertaining but disposable' bin". His fight against Gaara in the exams was listed as second best one in anime by AnimeCentral. Anime News Network also called Lee the "goofiest looking character" in the series and praised Kishimoto's "ninja-punk visual sensibilities" that allowed him to make Lee "damn cool when the action starts". In the NEO Awards 2007 from Neo, Rock Lee won in the category "Best Anime Character". He was also listed as one of the three "Honorable Mentions" from Naruto by Wizard Entertainment's Danica Davidson with comments from the article being focused on Lee's determination. When the Naruto manga ended, writer Yūto Kubota expressed that Lee was his favorite character.
