= Brian Donovan (actor) =

American actor

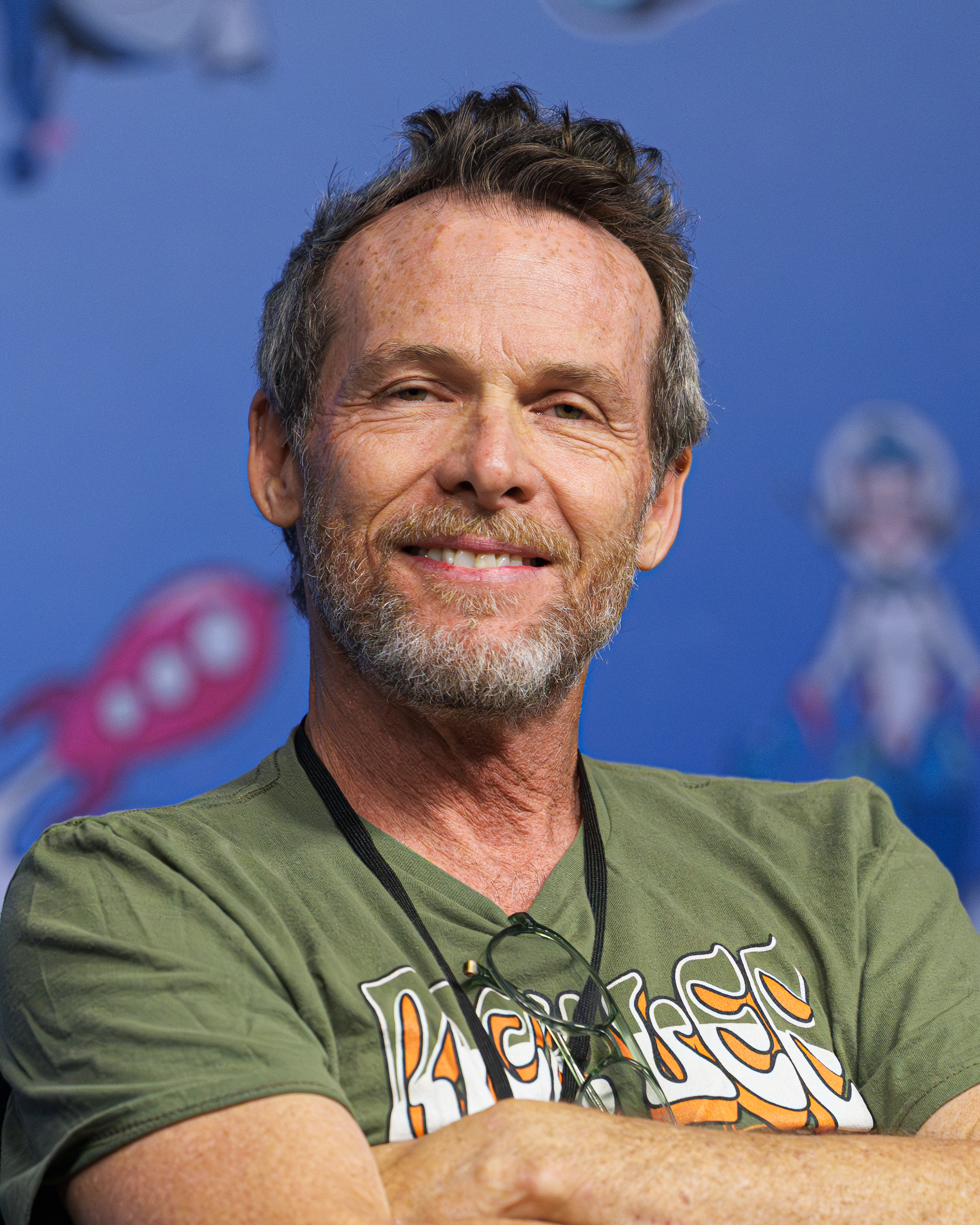
- Donovan in 2026
- Occupation: Voice actor
- Years active: 1991–present

Brian Donovan is an American voice actor. Donovan is best known for his role of Rock Lee from the critically acclaimed Naruto series. He has reprised his role of Rock Lee in Naruto: Shippuden and in 2010, he was cast as the voice of Salty in Alpha and Omega and its sequel. Donovan is also known as the lead role of Davis Motomiya from Digimon Adventure 02.

== Biography ==
Donovan was set to reprise his role as Davis Motomiya in Digimon Adventure: Last Evolution Kizuna. Due to the events of the COVID-19 pandemic and a fault in his home studio, however, the role was instead recast to Griffin Burns.

== Filmography ==
=== Animation/anime roles ===
- A.T.O.M. – Ollie Sharker, Rayza
- Boruto: Naruto Next Generations - Rock Lee
- Digimon Adventure 02 – Davis Motomiya
- Digimon Tamers – Narrator/Kai Urazoe
- Digimon Frontier – Terou, Mushroomon
- Flint the Time Detective – Tony Goodman, Monk
- Naruto – Rock Lee
- Naruto: Shippuden – Rock Lee
- Vampire Princess Miyu – Boy in Swamp (episode 10)
- The Zeta Project – Rudy

=== Movie roles ===
- Alpha and Omega – Salty
- Digimon: The Movie – Davis Motomiya
- Digimon: Revenge of Diaboromon – Davis Motomiya
- Naruto the Movie 3: Guardians of the Crescent Moon Kingdom – Rock Lee
- Naruto: Shippūden the Movie – Rock Lee
- Naruto Shippuden 3: Inheritors of the Will of Fire – Rock Lee
- The Last: Naruto the Movie – Rock Lee
- Boruto: Naruto the Movie – Rock Lee
- Digimon Adventure 02: The Beginning – Davis Motomiya
- Digimon Adventure 02: Digimon Hurricane Touchdown!! / Transcendent Evolution! The Golden Digimentals (standalone dub) - Davis Motomiya

=== Other roles ===
- Digimon Rumble Arena - Davis Motomiya
- Jetix – Promo/Commercial Announcer
- Mighty Me - Training Camp – Creator/Show's Host
