= Kōichi Tōchika =

Japanese voice actor

- Born: October 20, 1971 (age 54)
- Occupation: Voice actor
- Years active: 1992–present
- Notable credits: Naruto as Neji Hyūga; JoJo's Bizarre Adventure: Diamond Is Unbreakable as Toyohiro Kanedaichi; Digimon Adventure 02 as Hawkmon

Kōichi Tōchika (遠近 孝一, Tōchika Kōichi) born 20 October 1971 is a Japanese voice actor who works for Haikyo.

== Notable voice roles ==
=== Anime ===
- Lance in 07 Ghost
- Brindo and young Hody Jones in One Piece
- Check Mate and Ilioukhine in Kinnikuman Nisei (Ultimate Muscle)
- Arizona Governor in Eureka Seven Ao
- Yu Himura in Ef: A Fairy Tale of the Two
- En Daidouji in Brave Command Dagwon
- Erigor in Fairy Tail
- Griffin Minos in Saint Seiya
- Go Hibiki in Mach Go Go
- Groundman in Rockman.EXE Beast
- Hawkmon in Digimon Adventure 02
- Hayato Marikoji in Himawari!
- Hawktor in Bakugan Battle Brawlers: Gundalian Invaders
- Hazel Grouse in Saiyuki Reload Gunlock
- Hazel Grouse in Saiyuki Reload: Zeroin
- I'm Sorry Masked Man and Nightmare in Bobobo-bo Bo-bobo
- Jenai in Chrono Crusade
- Ken Amafuji in Boku wa Konomama Kaeranai
- Kotaro Kakinouchi in The Mythical Detective Loki Ragnarok
- Mirai in Mirmo!
- Neji Hyuga in Naruto
- Neji Hyuga in Naruto: Shippuden
- Neji Hyuga in Naruto SD
- Norio in Monster Rancher
- Sentarō Kotsubaki and Yylfordt Granz in Bleach
- Pawn in Weiß Kreuz
- Peath Glinhouse in Back Arrow
- Peta in Märchen Awakens Romance
- Raiha in Flame of Recca
- Rioroute Vilgyna in Candidate for Goddess
- Ryō Shirogane in Tokyo Mew Mew
- Ryu Amakusa in Detective Academy Q
- Ryunosuke Kurumi in HeartCatch Pretty Cure!
- Shiba (younger) in Groove Adventure RAVE
- Shinji Kume in He Is My Master
- Taishi Kuhonbutsu in Comic Party
- Tommy Parsy, Mr. Dog, Coach, and Ruby Green in the Snowboard Kids series
- Tsuyoshi Wabba in the Super Yo-Yo
- Toyohiro Kanedaichi in JoJo's Bizarre Adventure: Diamond Is Unbreakable
- Wei Fei Li in Ceres, Celestial Legend
- Yokota in Uzumaki
- Yōsui in Fushigi Yūgi OVA 2

Tōchika is also known for his role as the voice actor of Sumisu-san, スミスさん or "Mr Smith" on the audio CD of the textbook series Japanese For Busy People.

=== Anime Movies ===
- Hawkmon in Digimon Adventure: Last Evolution Kizuna (2020)

=== Television (live-action/drama) ===
- Mac Windy (Actor: Reuben Langdon)/B-Fighter Yanma in B-Fighter Kabuto
- Dangoron in B-Robo Kabutack
- Suction Force Pyma Beast Vampira (ep. 9) in Kyuukyuu Sentai GoGo Five
- Bowling Org (ep. 28) in Hyakujuu Sentai Gaoranger
- Thunder Ninja Unadaigo (ep. 24) in Ninpuu Sentai Hurricanger
- Trinoid 18: Rakopiman (ep. 29) in Bakuryu Sentai Abaranger
- Pukosian Jackil (ep. 31) in Tokusou Sentai Dekaranger
- (Secondary Antagonist) Commander Adorocs (ep. 34-45) in Genseishin Justiriser
- Savage Sky Barbaric Machine Beast Lenz Banki (ep. 9) in Engine Sentai Go-onger
- Secret Lantern Daigoyou in (eps. 28 - 49) Samurai Sentai Shinkenger
- Secret Lantern Daigoyou in Samurai Sentai Shinkenger vs. Go-onger: GinmakuBang!!
- Secret Lantern Daigoyou in Samurai Sentai Shinkenger Returns
- Secret Lantern Daigoyou in Tensou Sentai Goseiger vs. Shinkenger: Epic on Ginmaku

=== Drama CDs ===
- Gaki no Ryoubun series 6: Manatsu no Zankyou
- Mayonaka ni Oai Shimashou (Midori Kaidouji)
- Miscast series (Nanase Aikou)
- Ourin Gakuen series 1: Ikenai Seitokaishitsu (Fumitoshi Sakai)
- Ourin Gakuen series 2: Ai no Sainou (Fumitoshi Sakai)
- Yume wa Kirei ni Shidokenaku (Mamoru Ichinomiya)

=== Dubbing ===
- Das Boot, Bootsmann Lamprecht (Uwe Ochsenknecht)
- Joy Ride 2: Dead Ahead, Bobby Lawrence (Nick Zano)
- Rocko's Modern Life, Rocko (Carlos Alazraqui)
- Smart Ass in Who Framed Roger Rabbit (David Lander)
- Tigatron/TigerFalcon in Beast Wars (Blu Mankuma)
