= Seiji Morita =

Japanese anime film editor

Seiji Morita (森田 清次, Morita Seiji) is a Japanese anime film editor. He served as the Chief Editor for the anime adaptation of the visual novel Air.

== Filmography ==
- .hack//Sign
- Air – Chief Editor
- Black Jack (1996) – Editor
- Code Geass
- Juliette, je t'aime
- La Corda d'Oro - Primo Passo – Editor
- Madlax
- Naruto
- Noir
- Planetes
- Ranma ½
- The Twelve Kingdoms
- You're Under Arrest
