= Chie Nakamura =

Japanese voice actress (born 1978)

- 中村 千絵
- Born: May 14, 1978 (age 48); Tokyo, Japan
- Other name: Chie-chan
- Occupation: Voice actress
- Years active: 1998–present
- Agent: Axlone
- Notable credit: Naruto as Sakura Haruno
- Height: 156 cm (5 ft 1 in)

Chie Nakamura (中村 千絵, Nakamura Chie; born May 14, 1978) is a Japanese voice actress affiliated with Axlone. She voiced Sakura Haruno in Naruto and Sophitia Alexandra in Soulcalibur.

== Personal life ==
On November 28, 2022, Nakamura was diagnosed with ulcerative colitis and underwent medical treatment.

== Filmography ==
=== Anime series ===
- Dual! Parallel Trouble Adventure (1999) – Yayoi Schwael
- Naruto (2002–2007) – Sakura Haruno
- Naruto: Shippuden (2007–2017) – Sakura Haruno, Suzume
- Gintama (2009) – Tom
- K-on! (2010) – Mrs. Kawakami
- Eureka Seven AO (2012) – Rebecka Hallström
- Magic Kaito 1412 (2015) – Reiko Imaizumi
- Boruto (2017–) – Sakura Haruno
- Tokyo Ghoul:re (2018) – Matsumae
- Dororo (2019) – Nui No Kata

Unknown date

- Gilgamesh – Kiyoko Madoka
- Ojamajo Doremi series – Rere
- Musashi Gundoh – Yumehime
- Darker than Black: Kuro no Keiyakusha – Brita
- Oh My Goddess! – Satoko Yamano
- Natsume's Book of Friends – Winged Yōkai
- Gankutsuou – Eugénie de Danglars
- XxxHolic – Nanami
- Zoids Fuzors – Sweet
- Samurai Flamenco – Sumi Ishihara
- Ghost Hound – Chika Nakajima
- Kindaichi Case Files – Erina Tougami
- Ace Attorney – Chihiro Ayasato
- Delicious Party Pretty Cure - Akiho Nagomi (eps 1-34)

=== Original video animation ===
- Weiß Kreuz (1999) – Reina

=== Anime films ===
- The Last: Naruto the Movie (2014) – Sakura Haruno
- Boruto: Naruto the Movie (2015) – Sakura Uchiha

=== Video games ===
- Battle Stadium D.O.N (2006) – Sakura Haruno
- Sonic Riders (2006) - Wave the Swallow
- Soulcalibur Legends (2007) – Sophitia Alexandra
- Soulcalibur IV (2008) – Sophitia Alexandra
- Sonic Riders: Zero Gravity (2008) – Wave the Swallow
- Soulcalibur: Broken Destiny (2009) – Sophitia Alexandra
- Sonic Free Riders (2010) – Wave the Swallow
- Soulcalibur V (2012) – Elysium
- Warriors Orochi 3 Ultimate (2013) – Sophitia Alexandra
- Soulcalibur VI (2018) – Sophitia Alexandra
- Tactics Ogre: Reborn (2022) – Arycelle Dania
- Iwakura Aria (2024) – Aria Iwakura

Unknown date

- Eureka Seven: New Wave & New Vision – Jillian
- Mobile Suit Gundam Senki Record U.C. 0081 – Sherry
- Naruto series – Sakura Haruno
- Radiata Stories – Alicia
- Valkyrie Profile: Covenant of the Plume – Rosa

=== Dubbing ===
==== Live-action ====
- Amy Adams
  - American Hustle – Sydney Prosser
  - Arrival – Louise Banks
  - Batman v Superman: Dawn of Justice – Lois Lane
  - Cruel Intentions 2 – Kathryn Merteuil
  - Dear Evan Hansen – Cynthia Murphy
  - Justice League – Lois Lane
  - Man of Steel – Lois Lane
  - Trouble with the Curve – Mickey Lobel
  - Vice – Lynne Vincent Cheney
  - The Woman in the Window – Dr. Anna Fox
  - Zack Snyder's Justice League – Lois Lane
- Kirsten Dunst
  - Eternal Sunshine of the Spotless Mind – Mary Svevo
  - Mona Lisa Smile – Elizabeth "Betty" Warren (Jones)
  - Upside Down – Eden Moore
  - Wimbledon – Lizzie

Other

- 24 – Jane Sanders (Season 3) (Alexandra Lydon)
- American Pie Presents: The Naked Mile – Tracy Sterling (Jessy Schram)
- American Wedding – Cadence (January Jones)
- Aquamarine – Clare (Emma Roberts)
- Autumn in My Heart – Shin Yoo-mi (Han Na-na)
- Bear in the Big Blue House – Shadow (Tara Mooney)
- Black & White: The Dawn of Justice – Lan Hsi-Ying (Janine Chang)
- Black Widow – Antonia Dreykov / Taskmaster (Olga Kurylenko)
- Bride Wars – Emma Allen (Anne Hathaway)
- Broadchurch – Chloe Latimer (Charlotte Beaumont)
- Camp Rock – Tess (Meaghan Jette Martin)
- The Cloverfield Paradox – Ava Hamilton (Gugu Mbatha-Raw)
- Cold Case – Elissa (Marisol Nichols)
- Curse of Chucky – Nica Pierce (Fiona Dourif)
- Day of the Dead – Corporal Sarah Cross/Bowman (Mena Suvari)
- Death of Me – Christine (Maggie Q)
- Deep Blue Sea – Bird (Mary Kay Bergman (voice)/Frank Welker (song)) (Software Edition)
- Flying Swords of Dragon Gate – Zhang Xiao Wen (Gwei Lun-mei)
- Goodbye Christopher Robin – Olive / Nou (Kelly Macdonald)
- The Greatest Showman – Charity Hallett-Barnum (Michelle Williams)
- Green Book – Dolores Vallelonga (Linda Cardellini)
- Jeepers Creepers – Trish Jenner (Gina Philips)
- Killer Condom/Kondom des Grauens – Phyllis Higgins (Becker Meretto)
- Lake Placid: Legacy – Alice (Sai Bennett)
- Lara Croft: Tomb Raider (2004 Fuji TV edition) – Girls of Lara
- Life Is Beautiful/La vita è bella – Teacher (Alessandra Grassi)
- Monster Hunt – Huo Xiaolan (Bai Baihe)
- My Brother – Miryon (Lee Bo-young)
- Nanny McPhee – Evangeline (Kelly Macdonald)
- Narcos: Mexico – Mika Camarena (Alyssa Diaz)
- Oblivion – Julia Rusakova Harper (Olga Kurylenko)
- Ong-Bak: Muay Thai Warrior – Mue (Pumawari Yotogamon)
- Pan Am – Kate Cameron (Kelli Garner)
- Replicas – Mona Foster (Alice Eve)
- Road Trip – Tiffany Henderson (Rachel Blanchard)
- RV – Kathy Munro (JoJo)
- SEAL Team – Amanda "Mandy" Ellis (Jessica Paré)
- Simple Simon – Jennifer (Cecilia Forss)
- Suspiria (1998 DVD edition) – Pat Hingle (Eva Axén)
- The Tale of Sweeney Todd – Alice (Selina Boyack)
- Thunderbolts* – Antonia Dreykov / Taskmaster (Olga Kurylenko)
- Touch – Clea Hopkins (Gugu Mbatha-Raw)
- Zoo – Jamie Campbell (Kristen Connolly)
- Romeo!

==== Animation ====
- Casper's Haunted Christmas – Holly Jollimore
- DC Super Hero Girls – Batgirl
- Dora the Explorer – Diego
- Higglytown Heroes – Twinkle
- Klaus – Alva
- Moana – Sina
- Moana 2 – Sina
- Paddington Bear – Judy Brown
- Rugrats – Kira Watanabe Finster
- Sheriff Callie's Wild West – Sheriff Callie
- Teamo Supremo – Gene
