= Yōichi Masukawa =

Japanese voice actor

- 増川 洋一
- Born: 27 December 1978 (age 47); Kanagawa Prefecture, Japan
- Occupation: voice actor
- Years active: 1999–present
- Notable credit: Naruto as Rock Lee
- Height: 175.5 cm (5 ft 9 in)

Yōichi Masukawa (増川 洋一, Masukawa Yōichi; born 27 December 1978) is a Japanese voice actor from Kanagawa Prefecture, Japan.

== Voice roles ==
=== Anime television series ===
- Amaenaideyo (Yume Karyuudo)
- Boruto: Naruto Next Generations (Rock Lee)
- Desert Punk (Tamehiko Kawano)
- Gokusen (Haruhiko Uchiyama)
- Kekkaishi (Shu Akitsu)
- Naruto (Rock Lee)
- Naruto: Shippuden (Rock Lee)
- Rock Lee & His Ninja Pals (Rock Lee)
- Soul Hunter (Sibuxiang)
- The Galaxy Railways (Franz)
- Zentrix (Mango)

=== Video games ===
- Naruto series (Rock Lee)

=== Dubbing ===
==== Film ====
- American Pie Presents: Beta House - Dexter (JP Dub)
- Going to the Mat - Vincent "Fly" Shu (JP Dub)
- Just My Luck - Additional Voices (JP Dub)
- Prom Night - Ronnie Heflin (JP Dub)
- Roll Bounce - Mixed Mike (JP Dub)
- See No Evil - Additional Voices (JP Dub)
- Simon Says - Young Stanley (JP Dub)
- You Got Served - Marty (JP Dub)

==== TV series ====
- 24 - Josh (JP Dub)
- The 4400 - Additional Voices (JP Dub)
- Body of Proof - Additional Voices (JP Dub)
- Brothers & Sisters - Additional Voices (JP Dub)
- Criminal Minds - James (JP Dub)
- Disney Channel Games - Additional Voices (JP Dub)
- Hannah Montana - Additional Voices (JP Dub)
- The O.C. - Additional Voices (JP Dub)

==== Animation ====
- Deep - Evo
- The House of Magic - Daniel
