= Naruto: Shippuden season 11 =

Naruto: Shippuden
- Season 11
- DVD cover for the Shippuden story arc titled Paradise Life on a Boat
- No. of episodes: 21

Release
- Original network: TV Tokyo
- Original release: July 28 – December 28, 2011

Season chronology
- ← Previous; Season 10 Next → Season 12

The episode for the eleventh season of the anime television series Naruto: Shippuden is based on Part II of Masashi Kishimoto's Naruto manga series. The anime-original season aired from July to December 2011 and follows Naruto Uzumaki, Yamato, Aoba and Guy sailing through the ocean to the Paradise Island while the rest of Konoha prepares for the Fourth Great Ninja War. It was released on DVD under the name of Paradise Life on a Boat (船上のパラダイスライフ, Senjō no Paradaisu Raifu) on March 7, 2012, by Aniplex. The season was directed by Hayato Date, and produced by Studio Pierrot and TV Tokyo.

The season's English dub was streamed on Neon Alley from December 28, 2013, to May 17, 2014. The season would make its English television broadcast debut on Adult Swim's Toonami programming block and air from October 13, 2018, (Note: Due to Toonami schedule changes, Naruto: Shippuden was promoted from its usual circulated early Sunday morning timeslots later in the block to being near the front of it at 10 p.m. ET/PT, meaning it actually aired on Saturday night. This promotion lasted until December 15, 2018, where thereafter it returned to its standard late night timeslots on Sunday morning.) to March 24, 2019.

The season contains four musical themes: two openings and two endings. The openings theme are "Lovers" (ラヴァーズ) performed by 7!! (used for episodes 222 to 230) and "Newsong" performed by Tacica (used for episodes 231 to 242). The ending themes are "Yokubō o Sakebe!!!!" (欲望を叫べ!!!!; lit. 'Shout Out Your Desires!!!!') performed by Okamoto's (used for episodes 222 to 230) and "Place to Try" performed by Totalfat (used for episodes 231 to 242). The fifth feature film, Naruto the Movie: Blood Prison, was released on July 27, 2011. The broadcast version from episode 222 to 226 uses "Lovers" (ラヴァーズ) as the opening theme and includes scenes from Blood Prison in the opening sequence.

== Episodes ==
| No. overall | No. in season | Title | Directed by | Written by | Animation directed by | Original release date | English air date |
|---|---|---|---|---|---|---|---|
Paradise Life on a Boat
| 222 | 1 | "The Five Kage's Decision"; Transliteration: "Gokage no Ketsudan" (Japanese: 五影の決断) | Kiyomu Fukuda | Shin Yoshida | Ik-Hyun Eum | July 28, 2011 | December 28, 2013 |
Following her council with Hidden Leaf officials and an inquiry of Naruto Uzumaki being at Mt. Myoboku, Tsunade leaves for the Land of Lightning to meet with the other Kage to discuss the Fourth Great Ninja War and provide intel of a possible Akatsuki location that Anko provided. While she agreed that they should form a fifth independent intelligence---gathering organization, she is upset to find the other Kage want to hide Naruto and Killer Bee on an island Ay selected instead of having them participate in the war. Tsunade relents after Gaara provides a just cause for the decision and meets with Ay after to request Bee's help in training Naruto to use the Nine Tails's power. The Raikage reveals her request is not needed as the island he selected happens to be where he and Bee trained in their younger years. Tsunade later makes the arrangements while lying to Naruto that he is on a "top-secret, S-rank mission" with Yamato to the "resort" island mentioned in the Great Elder's prophecy where he is to meet the octopus.
| 223 | 2 | "The Young Man and the Sea"; Transliteration: "Seinen to Umi" (Japanese: 青年と海) | Directed by : Mitsutoshi Satou; Storyboarded by : Tomoyuki Kurokawa | Junki Takegami | Shigeki Kawai | August 4, 2011 | January 4, 2014 |
Naruto, accompanied by Yamato, Might Guy, Aoba, and three other ninja, embarks on what he was told to be a "top-secret, S-rank mission". When the group reaches the only port in the Land of Fire, they find that the bay for over fifteen years is being terrorized by a giant marlin summoned from the Third Great Ninja War who can not return to its point of origin. With Yamato providing a boat and fishing rod, Naruto and his group set out to help a fisherman named Yusuke in catching the marlin to avenge his father. Following an epic fishing struggle, Yusuke finally catches the marlin with Naruto removing the embedded shuriken on the fish's forehead so it can return to its home. Naruto and the others finally set sail for the Hidden Cloud.
| 224 | 3 | "The Ninja of Benisu"; Transliteration: "Benisu no Shōnin" (Japanese: 紅州の商忍) | Directed by : Yoshihiro Sugai & Hiroshi Kataoka; Storyboarded by : Jun Kamiya | Katsuhiko Chiba | Hiromi Yoshinuma | August 11, 2011 | January 11, 2014 |
Naruto's group is forced to land on Nikasai Island after everyone is nearly subjected to seasickness and with Guy falling ill. Naruto meets up with Sakura Haruno, Ino Yamanaka, and Choji Akimichi as Tsunade had sent them to the island to gather various medicinal herbs and ointments needed for the Fourth Great Ninja War. While Naruto joins the group in their search, they find that the items that Tsunade requested are being monopolized by a trio of ninja from Benisu island who are offering to sell at expensive prices. Competing for the last ointment, Naruto saves the Benisu ninja, and their leader decides to give the Konoha ninja what they acquired as an offering to pay both his debt and gratitude to them. Naruto and Sakura part ways soon after.
| 225 | 4 | "The Cursed Ghost Ship"; Transliteration: "Norowareta Yūreisen" (Japanese: 呪われた幽霊船) | Yutaka Kagawa | Masahiro Hikokubo | Masayuki Kouda | August 18, 2011 | January 18, 2014 |
While Yamato tells Naruto ghost stories to pass the time, they soon encounter a strange and abandoned ship floating on the sea matching Yamato's description of a ghost ship from one of his stories. Following Yamato and Aoba onto the ship, Naruto finds a young cabin boy named Hishaku working hard and clarifies mundane reasons for the ship's strange appearance even though his shipmates were all slaughtered by a gigantic sea monster called the Skeleton Crab. Eventually the Skeleton Crab makes its presence known and grabs Yamato whom Naruto, with Hishaku's help in exploiting a soft-spot, saves by killing it with a Rasengan. Hishaku is then reunited with the ghosts of his crew and their captain before vanishing. To Naruto's horror he later learns that Hishaku had long been dead and could not move on until his crew had been avenged.
| 226 | 5 | "Battleship Island"; Transliteration: "Senkan no Shima" (Japanese: 戦艦の島) | Directed by : Maki Odaira; Storyboarded by : Tsutomu Naniwa | Yasuyuki Suzuki | Beom-Seok Hong | August 25, 2011 | January 25, 2014 |
Naruto and the crew emerge from a storm while on their way to the Land of Lightning. They find themselves under fire by makeshift battleship cannons built on a pirate-owned island and controlled by Captain Gataro with intentions to sink the boat and harvest the remains. Losing his headband during a brief scuffle with Gataro, Naruto is rescued by Yamato's Wood Style---encasing their ship into a submarine-like shell and escaping to an underwater cavern underneath the island before breaking apart. While Yamato recuperates after finding a hot spring, the others find a mass graveyard which Aoba deduces from a parchment to be the original island residents forced to spend the rest of their lives in the caves after the pirates took their home and slaughtered their friends. Naruto takes a ribbon from a grave and uses it as a temporary headband, promising to avenge the islanders. With a clever plan of sending his clones to disable the cannons and using the underground hot spring, Naruto and his group rocket their ship up from the island's dormant volcano and back into the sea while wiping out the pirate fleet. Leaving Gataro and his men tied up and regaining his headband, Naruto plays his final respects to the islanders.
| 227 | 6 | "The Forgotten Island"; Transliteration: "Bōkyaku no Shima" (Japanese: 忘却の島) | Directed by : Masahito Otani; Storyboarded by : Toshiyasu Furukawa | Katsuhiko Chiba | Naoki Takahashi, Noritomo Hattori & Takashi Saijou | September 1, 2011 | February 1, 2014 |
When Guy is abducted by a giant bird during a storm, the crew find themselves on the shore of an island home to numerous summoning animals. While Naruto and Yamato search for Guy, Aoba's pursuit of a young woman brings him to an abandoned house where he finds a journal detailing a research group developing an ultimate summoning animal to meet their client's demands. Naruto and Yamato find Guy as Aoba is then led to a research lab in a volcanic crater where he is shown the ultimate animal in its pupa state. Aoba learns that it is an anti-ninja weapon capable of assimilating its prey's abilities and because of its overwhelming need to devour, it slaughtered the researchers. In the meantime, after reuniting with Guy, Naruto and Yamato follow the giant bird to the crater where there are curiously numerous animals gathered before entering the lab. The ultimate summoning animal awakens and devours two of the animals, emerging its imago form before displaying its genjutsu and lightning style attacks. The group attempts to knock the ultimate summoning animal into the magma but it grows wings and tries to fly off. The animals wanting to avenge their kin attack, while the young woman, Honoka, revealed to be a lingering spirit of a researcher who attempted to seal it before her death, subdues the ultimate summoning animal long enough for Naruto to bifurcate it with a Rasen-Shuriken and it falls into the magma. As the ship later leaves, Aoba hears Honoka thanking him.
| 228 | 7 | "Fight! Rock Lee!"; Transliteration: "Tatakae Rokku Rī!" (Japanese: 闘えロック・リー!) | Directed by : Kanryou Kishikawa; Storyboarded by : Jun Kamiya | Masahiro Hikokubo | Zenjirou Ukulele, Hong Rong & Yuuko Ishizaki | September 8, 2011 | February 8, 2014 |
Might Guy tells Naruto of the time he gave Lee "visualization" training following an incident he didn't clearly remember except a severe apology to a restaurant owner for damages to the establishment. With a blurred memory, he improvised training techniques that Lee believed would rejog muscle memory off a list of circled items on a menu he took from the restaurant. With the last entry being alcohol, Guy tries to avoid having Lee learn the Drunken Fist fighting style by instead having them train on a boat in rough waters. Like Guy, Lee also suffers from seasickness but is able to balance himself on the boat, a feat which resembles Drunken Fist. During an emotional soul-baring moment from Lee, Guy remembers Lee devastating the restaurant in an accidental drunken state when protecting Guy from a drunk trying to dine and ditch. After he and Lee make amends, Guy helps Lee develop the Sea-Sick Fist and is confident that Lee will one day overcome his seasickness to master the technique. Naruto pokes holes into the practical use of the Sea-Sick Fist.
| 229 | 8 | "Eat or Die! Mushrooms from Hell!"; Transliteration: "Kuu ka Kuwareru ka! Odoru Kinoko Jigoku" (Japanese: 食うか食われるか!踊るキノコ地獄) | Kiyomu Fukuda | Shin Yoshida | Ik-Hyun Eum | September 22, 2011 | February 15, 2014 |
Naruto's ship stops at a port to resupply in preparation of heading into the Sea of Silence, a stretch of ocean with no wind or fish which takes two weeks to traverse. While buying supplies, Naruto purchases a mushroom called a Moldshroom from a merchant, which supposedly helps sailors avoid starvation. But once on the Sea of Silence, the Moldshroom multiplies quickly, destroying all of the food and water. Yamato falls into a coma due to the fungi eating away at his Wood Style chakra and starving painfully for days, Naruto and Guy eventually resort to trying the Moldshrooms. Poisoned and violently attacking one another, the blows cause both of them to expel out enough mushrooms from their system for a moment of sobriety. Out of options for food, Naruto summons Gamatatsu intending to eat the toad but instead has Gamatatsu bring back Shima's meal of insects for the crew to eat, enabling them to survive and ambush the merchant and his two associates when they attempt to rob them. Once out of the Sea of Silence, they send the criminals back along it with a Moldshroom. Naruto ends up being forced to choose the now inert Moldshrooms or Shima's cooking.
| 230 | 9 | "Revenge of the Shadow Clones"; Transliteration: "Kage no Gyakushū" (Japanese: 影の逆襲) | Directed by : Hiroshi Kataoka & Yoshihiro Sugai; Storyboarded by : Yoshihiro Sugai | Yasuyuki Suzuki | Eiichi Tokura & Takashi Nishikawa | September 29, 2011 | February 22, 2014 |
The ship is caught in a storm and Naruto uses four shadow clones to protect the ship for a prolonged duration of time to the clones' dismay. After the storm and being knocked out from when a pulley snapped, Naruto wakes up to find his clones acting differently and demanding better treatment. However, Naruto's refusal forces the clones to mutiny, taking him hostage while forcing Yamato and the others to land on a nearby island until their demands can be met. After a series of botched rescue schemes, Guy attempts to have Naruto understand the four clones by seeing them as embodiments of his own personality. But Naruto still refuses and resorts to summoning more shadow clones as a means to defeat them only to be restrained by his reinforcements as well as the four clones. They decide to replace him after killing him and approach. Naruto blinks into a reality and learns it was a dream from one of the Naruto clones that transmitted itself to the real Naruto when he sacrificed himself to save the original from being hit by the pulley. This makes Naruto realize the worth of his clones and he releases the remaining three.
| 231 | 10 | "The Closed Route"; Transliteration: "Tozasareta Kōro" (Japanese: 閉ざされた航路) | Ken'ichi Nishida | Junki Takegami & Daisuke Watanabe | Shigeki Kawai & Noriko Ohtake | October 6, 2011 | March 1, 2014 |
Shikaku, notices his son's concern that his best may not be good enough for the war so he sends Shikamaru alongside Tenten to meet up with Naruto for a supply delivery on the peaceful yet unsettling Mokuzu Island. Once Shikamaru and Tenten meet up with Naruto, they and the crew find themselves in a fogbank and forced through an obstacle field of reefs and a big whirlpool. Although Guy, Yamato, and Naruto use their signature moves, they slowly deplete their chakra as the obstacle repeats itself. With Naruto using the last of his chakra to muster enough shadow clones to deal with the rocks, he convinces Shikamaru to think up an escape plan. Using one of Tenten's scrolls to store the ship, the group hides and catches the thieving villagers red-handed as they attempt to collect and profit from the shipwreck.
| 232 | 11 | "The Girls' Get-Together"; Transliteration: "Konoha no Joshikai" (Japanese: 木ノ葉の女子会) | Directed by : Shuu Watanabe; Storyboarded by : Shinji Satou | Katsuhiko Chiba | Kumiko Horikoshi | October 13, 2011 | March 8, 2014 |
During a discussion for the Hyuga Clan's role in the upcoming war, the clan head Hiashi Hyuga names his nephew Neji to lead the frontline, concerned that Hinata may not be strong enough. Tenten tells Hinata that Tsunade is looking for her. As Hinata travels across the village to find the Hokage she eventually finds her about to meet with the Land of Fire's Feudal Lord. That night, Tenten holds a girls only get-together consisting of herself, Hinata, Sakura, Ino, and Shiho at the Barbe-Q where they reminisce about their Chuunin exam and how Naruto became the village hero. On the other side of the Barbe-Q, Kiba and the rest of the guys also hold a boys get-together and reminisce about the Sasuke Retrieval Mission to which Shino is still upset about not having been a part of. Soon after, livid since her meeting with the Feudal Lord, a drunk Tsunade joins the girls and Hinata comes to a realization that protecting Naruto should be her primary concern. She trains with Neji the following day.
| 233 | 12 | "Naruto's Imposter"; Transliteration: "Sanjō, Nise? Naruto" (Japanese: 参上、偽? ナルト) | Directed by : Naoki Horiuchi; Storyboarded by : Tsutomu Naniwa | Shin Yoshida | Naoki Takahashi, Takashi Saijou & Konomi Sakurai | October 20, 2011 | March 15, 2014 |
While traversing to the next harbor by land in the Land of Water's territory, Naruto's group comes across a large bandit claiming to be Naruto Uzumaki. Naruto makes quick work of the imposter and an officer named Iggy arrives offering to take over handling the imposter. After they part ways, Iggy is soon revealed to be the conspirator for his partner Banna's impersonation of Naruto so that one day he can become famous as the one who defeated Naruto. But the con-artists' exploits attract the attention of mercenary ninja who capture Banna for a potential bounty. Iggy reaches out to Naruto's group for help while coming clean. Though they feigned washing their hands of the event, Naruto and the others make their move once Iggy tries saving Banna on his own and dispatches the mercenaries. Iggy and Banna part ways with Naruto as the two decide to make an honest living.
| 234 | 13 | "Naruto's Favorite Student"; Transliteration: "Naruto no Manadeshi" (Japanese: ナルトの愛弟子) | Gorou Sessha | Junki Takegami | Masayuki Kouda | October 27, 2011 | March 22, 2014 |
Wanting to participate in the upcoming war, Konohamaru and his friends train before interviewing other ninja to see how best to prepare. After they are berated by Sakura for taking war lightly, she drafts them into stocking medical supplies. Konohamaru's venting over being looked down upon as a genin attracts the attention of Shikamaru who asks him the identity of the "King" he is to protect. When Konohamaru is unable to answer, Shikamaru gives him advice to think it over along with a shogi piece-shaped rock that he wrote the "King" kanji on. After being thrown out by Tsunade, Konohamaru decides to prove his worth by challenging Temari shortly after her delivery of a scroll to Tsunade. Initially outmatched, he goes all out and readies a Rasengan after hearing Temari not only mock Naruto but insulting him too. Luckily, Shikamaru learned of the match from Udon and Moegi and stopped it before anyone got killed. Moegi slaps some sense into him while recounting her experience during Pain's attack and Konohamaru realizes that the "King" he wants to protect are the villagers who are unable to defend themselves. Temari compliments Konohamaru's mastery of such a high-level jutsu and leaves to tell her village that the Hidden Leaf have promising young shinobi. Shikamaru reports to Tsunade about Konohamaru's words of protecting the village and of one day becoming Hokage. It brings a smile to Tsunade as she remembers her younger brother Nawaki made a similar speech when she gave him their grandfather's necklace.
| 235 | 14 | "The Kunoichi of Nadeshiko Village"; Transliteration: "Nadeshiko no Kunoichi" (Japanese: 撫子のくノ一) | Directed by : Jun'ichi Fujise; Storyboarded by : Jun Kamiya | Yuka Miyata | Beom-Seok Hong | November 3, 2011 | March 29, 2014 |
While the ship is docked for supplies, Naruto encounters a kunoichi named Shizuka knocking away a puppet user named Kokuyō who has been hounding her ninety-eight times. Tokiwa, Shizuka's attendant, sees Naruto and learns that he is Jiraiya's student. Tokiwa explains she and Shizuka come from a mostly female village who traditionally marry men who can defeat them in combat. Jiraiya visited the village and fought Shizuka's mother to a stand-still before ending in a draw and promising their students would finish their fight if they cannot. Naruto declines at first but is convinced to reconsider after learning that Shizuka emotionally shut herself down after the man she loved was mysteriously murdered. Naruto uses a Shadow Clone to cover for him as he faces Shizuka while trying to reach her, their battle interrupted by Kokuyō who reveals his puppets were part of a complex jutsu to capture Shizuka. Naruto saves Shizuka and sends Kokuyō flying with a Rasengan, managing to convince Shizuka through his own unrequited love for Sakura that she can change her destiny and better life at her village.
| 236 | 15 | "Friends You Can Count On"; Transliteration: "Nakama no Senaka" (Japanese: 仲間の背中) | Directed by : Tomoya Tanaka; Storyboarded by : Masahiro Hosoda | Shin Yoshida | Shigeki Kawai & Kengo Matsumoto | November 10, 2011 | April 5, 2014 |
While talking with a group of students, Shino talks about an event after the failed Sasuke Retrieval mission that brought him and his teammates closer as friends. Following their failed attempt to capture a thief that they learn is a Rogue Ninja from the Hidden Waterfall Village, Shino enters a depression over his inability to defend himself in close-range combat. Kurenai has Kiba and Hinata take Shino to a hot spring to draw Shino from the depression; to do this while offering to train their teammate in taijutsu. But even after Shino became agile enough to dodge Kiba's attack, he still felt unworthy to be a member of Team 8 as Kiba and Hinata receive a message that the bandit is nearby. But when Kiba and Hinata are captured, Shino comes to their aid and defeats the bandit with the skills he learned.
| 237 | 16 | "Ah, My Hero Lady Tsunade!"; Transliteration: "Aa, Akogare no Tsunade-sama" (Japanese: ああ、憧れの綱手様) | Directed by : Hisashi Ishii; Storyboarded by : Shinji Satou | Katsuhiko Chiba | Zenjirou Ukulele, Manabu Akita, Hong Rong & Yuuko Ishizaki | November 24, 2011 | April 12, 2014 |
While helping Lee train before he gets dragged underwater, Tenten remembers her childhood dream to become like Tsunade whom she idolized. After becoming a member of Team Guy, Tenten made attempts to be more like Tsunade but lacked her skills or physical attributes that made her a legendary kunoichi. But seeing Lee's resolve to become a taijutsu expert inspired Tenten to develop her own fighting style as a ninja-tool user, Guy encouraging her to never give up following the events of the Chunin Exams. In the present, after making sure Lee didn't drown and placing the weight on his back in the middle of his push-ups, Tenten resolves to become a legendary kunoichi in her own right.
| 238 | 17 | "Sai's Day Off"; Transliteration: "Sai no Kyūsoku" (Japanese: サイの休息) | Masaaki Kumagai | Yasuyuki Suzuki | Hiroyuki Yamashita | December 1, 2011 | April 19, 2014 |
Sai spends his day off strolling around the village and drawing when he encounters three children he initially had trouble interacting with, noting that two of them remind him of Naruto and Sakura. This causes Sai to remember the events of his first mission as a Team Kakashi member and how he changed because of it, hoping to someday share the bond that his teammates share with Sasuke. Eventually reaching a nearby village that was indirectly affected by Pain's attack, Sai uses the doors of a destroyed house to paint a mural of himself, Naruto and Sakura holding hands with Sasuke.
| 239 | 18 | "The Legendary Ino-Shika-Cho Trio"; Transliteration: "Densetsu no Ino-Shika-Chō" (Japanese: 伝説の猪鹿蝶) | Kiyomu Fukuda | Masahiro Hikokubo | Ik-Hyun Eum | December 8, 2011 | April 26, 2014 |
As Team Asuma considers the impending war, they encounter Kosuke Maruboshi, who reminds them of the time that they rescued him while they were still genin. With this, Kosuke tells them of the time their fathers saved him during the Invasion of Konoha with their Formation Ino–Shika–Chō. Seeing that they're left somewhat rattled by this story, Kosuke reminds them that great shinobi aren't made in a day. As the team contemplates everything, they decide to perfect their own formation, insisting that they'll be fine because they're not alone.
| 240 | 19 | "Kiba's Determination"; Transliteration: "Kiba no Ketsui" (Japanese: キバの決意) | Directed by : Ken'ichi Nishida; Storyboarded by : Shinji Satou | Daisuke Watanabe | Masayuki Kouda & Kayano Tomizawa | December 15, 2011 | May 3, 2014 |
Kiba becomes very upset that Naruto, the dead-last in their Academy years, has become such a Hero of the Hidden Leaf Village. After being chided by his mother Tsume and partner Shino, he decides to train in order to become stronger. Kakashi Hatake happens upon Kiba and Akamaru training, where Kiba asks him to help him train, as he's the only jounin sensei available. Kakashi, however, simply summons his ninken to aid Kiba and Akamaru in their training. Initially giving up after being defeated by the hounds, Akamaru carries Kiba to a tree in the village, where he sees that Naruto had broken Kiba's record in speed since the time they were children racing for candy. With his determination renewed, he demands a rematch with the hounds and is successfully able to retrieve the scroll. With this, Kiba races to the tree and sets a new record, declaring that he'll never give up.
| 241 | 20 | "Kakashi, My Eternal Rival!"; Transliteration: "Kakashi, Waga Eien no Raibaru yo" (Japanese: カカシ、我が永遠のライバルよ) | Directed by : Yuusuke Onoda; Storyboarded by : Kiyomu Fukuda | Junki Takegami | Hiromi Yoshinuma | December 22, 2011 | May 10, 2014 |
In the Leaf village, while meeting with Tsunade about the impending war, Kakashi receives an emergency messenger tortoise from Guy with an SOS message, so he heads out to find out what has happened. On board the ship, Guy recalls the time he and Kakashi first became rivals and their numerous battles since then. Back on the ship bound for Lightning, the three jōnin have a meeting, during which Yamato tells them about a rumour of a shinobi capable of not only copying someone's appearance, but also their chakra. Kakashi soon arrives at the ship and calls for Guy. Unaware that he had sent an SOS message, Guy comes to the conclusion that the one before him could be one of those imposters that Yamato spoke of. With this notion, Guy proceeds to attack Kakashi and later Aoba and Yamato when they side with Kakashi. After giving Guy irrefutable proof that he is who he said he is by telling him something from their youth, Kakashi returns to Konoha upon learning that the SOS tortoise was sent by accident.
| 242 | 21 | "Naruto's Vow"; Transliteration: "Naruto no Chikai" (Japanese: ナルトの誓い) | Directed by : Naoki Horiuchi; Storyboarded by : Tsutomu Naniwa | Yuka Miyata | Konomi Sakurai & Naoki Takahashi | December 28, 2011 | May 17, 2014 |
During his final stop for supplies on an island in the Land of Water, Naruto runs into Akatsuchi and Kurotsuchi of the Hidden Stone Village, who are on an assignment to deliver a letter from Onoki to Mei Terumi. After Akatsuchi is wounded in a run-in with a group of ninja who deserted the Hidden Mist in protest of the Allied Shinobi Forces, Naruto convinces the group's leader to let go of his grudge against the Hidden Stone for a past incident. He promises to carry the world into a time of peace. The episode ends with a boat appearing that has been sent from the Land of Lightning to pick up the group from Hidden Leaf Village.

== Home media release ==
=== Japanese ===
| Volume | Date | Discs | Episodes | Reference |
|---|---|---|---|---|
| 1 | March 7, 2012 | 1 | 222–225 | |
| 2 | April 4, 2012 | 1 | 226–229 | |
| 3 | May 2, 2012 | 1 | 230–233 | |
| 4 | June 6, 2012 | 1 | 234–237 | |
| 5 | July 4, 2012 | 1 | 238–242 | |

=== English ===
Viz Media (North America – Region 1/A)
| Box set | Date | Discs | Episodes | Reference |
|---|---|---|---|---|
| 18 | April 8, 2014 | 2 | 219–231 | |
| 19 | July 8, 2014 | 2 | 232–244 | |

Viz Media (North America, Region 1 Blu-ray sets)
| Volume | Date | Discs | Episodes | Ref. |
|---|---|---|---|---|
| 9 | January 26, 2026 | 4 | 221–248 | |

Manga Entertainment (United Kingdom and Ireland – Region 2/B)
| Volume | Date | Discs | Episodes | Reference |
|---|---|---|---|---|
| 18 | July 21, 2014 | 2 | 219–231 | |
| 19 | October 13, 2014 | 2 | 232–244 | |

Madman Entertainment (Australia and New Zealand – Region 4/B)
| Collection | Date | Discs | Episodes | Reference |
|---|---|---|---|---|
| 18 | June 18, 2014 | 2 | 219–231 | |
| 19 | August 20, 2014 | 2 | 232–244 | |
