= Naruto: Shippuden season 12 =

Naruto: Shippuden
- Season 12
- DVD cover for the Shippuden story arc titled Nine-Tails Taming and Karmic Encounters
- No. of episodes: 33

Release
- Original network: TV Tokyo
- Original release: January 5 – August 16, 2012

Season chronology
- ← Previous; Season 11 Next → Season 13

The episodes for the twelfth season of the anime television series Naruto: Shippuden is based on Part II of Masashi Kishimoto's Naruto manga series. The season was directed by Hayato Date, and produced by Pierrot and TV Tokyo. The season follows Naruto Uzumaki controlling the power of the Nine-Tails's chakra with the help of Killer Bee at the start of the Fourth Shinobi World War; Episodes 257 to 260 serve as a summary recap focusing on Naruto and Sasuke from the Part I storyline. The season aired from January 5 to August 16, 2012.

The English dub of the season aired for Neon Alley on May 24, 2014, to January 3, 2015. The season would make its English television broadcast debut on Adult Swim's Toonami programming block and air from March 31 to November 17, 2019.

The DVD collection was released on October 3, 2012, under the title Nine-Tails Taming and Karmic Encounters (九尾掌握と因果なる邂逅の章, Kyūbi Shōaku to Inga naru Kaigō no Shō). Episodes 248 and 249 were released together under the title Special Edition: Naruto's Birth (特別編 ~ナルト誕生~) on August 1. Episodes 257 to 260 were released on September 5, under the title Special Edition: Two Fates (特別編 ~宿命の二人~).

The season contains five songs between two openings and three endings. The first opening theme, "Newsong" performed by Tacica, is used from episodes 243 to 256. The second opening theme, "Totsugeki Rock" (突撃ロック; lit. 'Assault Rock') performed by The Cro-Magnons, is used from episodes 257 to 275. The first ending theme, "By My Side" (バイマイサイド) performed by Hemenway, is used from episodes 243 to 256. The second ending theme, "Cascade" (カスケード) performed by Unlimits, is used from episodes 257 to 268. The third ending theme, "Kono Koe Karashite" (この声枯らして; lit. 'Shout This Voice Dry') performed by Aisha featuring Chehon, is used from episodes 269 to 275. The sixth feature film, Road to Ninja: Naruto the Movie, was released on July 28, 2012. The broadcast versions of episodes 271 to 275 includes scenes from the film in the opening themes, while retaining the music "Totsugeki Rock".

== Episodes ==
No. overall	No. in season	Title	Directed by	Written by	Animation directed by	Original release date	English air date
Nine-Tails Taming and Karmic Encounters
243	1	"Land Ahoy! Is this the Paradise Island?"; Transliteration: "Jōriku! Rakuen no Shima?" (Japanese: 上陸! 楽園の島?)	Hiroshi Yamazaki	Katsuhiko Chiba	Kengo Matsumoto	January 5, 2012	May 24, 2014
When Naruto Uzumaki's group reach Paradise Island, they are saved from a giant squid by the octopus from the Great Frog Sage's prophecy: Killer Bee in Eight-Tails form. Despite Naruto's initial reservations, he learns from the island's caretaker Motoi that Bee is a Jinchuriki who tamed his tailed beast and requests his mentorship. But Bee refuses, even more so when Naruto accidentally insulted him during a rap session after a fist bump. While Motoi takes offense to Naruto insulting Bee while coming to him for help, he takes him and Yamato to the Waterfall of Truth where Bee meditated as part of his training. Naruto learns that he must overcome the embodiment of his inner darkness before he can face the Nine-Tails.
244	2	"Killer Bee and Motoi"; Transliteration: "Kirā Bī to Motoi" (Japanese: キラービーとモトイ)	Directed by : Hideki Takayama; Storyboarded by : Yutaka Kagawa	Shin Yoshida	Beom-Seok Hong & Kouji Furuya	January 12, 2012	May 31, 2014
While answering Naruto's need to learn more about Bee to find a way to overcome his dark side, Motoi confesses that he was Bee's childhood friend and he tried to kill him after he became the Eight-Tails jinchuriki since his father died when the tailed beast was sealed after being extracted from its previous host. While disguised at the time, Motoi continues to follow Bee and witnesses him overcoming his abuse by their fellow villagers. Later, as Naruto thinks about how to overcome his dark self, Motoi is grabbed by the giant squid. Bee appears as the Eight Tails and saves Motoi. When Motoi asks Bee why he saved him despite his attempt to kill him, Bee answers in a rap that it is because they are friends.
245	3	"The Next Challenge! Naruto vs. The Nine Tails"; Transliteration: "Saranaru Shiren! Naruto VS Kyūbi!!" (Japanese: さらなる試練! ナルトVS九尾!!)	Kanryou Kishikawa	Junki Takegami	Chiyuki Tanaka	January 19, 2012	June 7, 2014
Having reached an understanding with Killer Bee, Naruto uses what he learned to overcome his dark self while thanking his counterpart for shaping who he is now. Bee declares himself Naruto's instructor while taking him and Yamato to a temple behind the waterfall, explaining it to be a training ground for Jinchuriki to directly confront and tame their Tailed Beasts. Bee, Yamato, and Naruto enter a chamber where Naruto must fight the Nine Tails once opening his seal, Bee advises the youth to extract the Nine Tails' chakra as Naruto takes advantage of his mediated state to assume Sage Mode.
246	4	"The Orange Spark"; Transliteration: "Orenji-iro no Kagayaki" (Japanese: オレンジ色の輝き)	Masahiko Murata	Yasuyuki Suzuki	Shigeki Kawai	January 26, 2012	June 14, 2014
During his battle with the Nine Tails, Naruto is almost consumed by the tailed beast's hatred when a red-haired woman intervenes. Despite Naruto's assumption that she was illusion, she introduces herself as the chakra imprint of his real mother Kushina Uzumaki. Kushina tells her story about how she met Minato Namikaze in the Academy and how she used to hate her red hair because others made of fun of her. Kushina's views of her hair changed when Minato used it to track down Hidden Cloud ninja who kidnapped her because of her special chakra, falling in love with Minato as a result. She then entrusts Naruto that he will fulfil their dreams.
247	5	"Target: Nine Tails"; Transliteration: "Nerawa-reta Kyūbi" (Japanese: 狙われた九尾)	Directed by : Hisashi Ishii; Storyboarded by : Shinji Satou	Junki Takegami	Hong Rong & Yuuko Ishizaki	February 2, 2012	June 21, 2014
Naruto manages to defeat the Nine Tails and extract its chakra before imprisoning the monster in a new seal, promising to set things right with the tailed beast. Revealing that Minato gave her time, Kushina decides to give Naruto the full story about the Nine Tails attack on the Hidden Leaf Village. She begins by revealing herself as the previous Nine Tails Jinchuriki from the Hidden Whirlpool Village, a close ally of the Hidden Leaf Village that was destroyed as others feared her people's powerful sealing techniques. Kushina then explains that the seal on the female Jinchuriki wavers during their pregnancy, having been moved to a secret location along with Minato, the Third Hokage's wife, Biwako Sarutobi, a medi-nin named Taji, and an ANBU team. But the ANBU are all killed by Tobi as he infiltrates the venue.
248	6	"The Fourth Hokage's Death Match!"; Transliteration: "Yondaime no Shitō!!" (Japanese: 四代目の死闘!!)	Masaaki Kumagai	Junki Takegami	Hiroyuki Yamashita	February 9, 2012	June 28, 2014
Kushina successfully delivers Naruto, but their celebration comes short when Tobi suddenly appears, killing both Taji and Biwako before holding the newborn hostage to keep the Fourth Hokage from restoring the seal on Kushina. Though Minato quickly saves Naruto, Tobi succeeds in freeing the Nine Tails and placing it under the control of his Sharingan. Kushina survived the extraction, saved by Minato when Tobi orders the Nine Tails to kill her. Minato leaves Kushina with their son as he pursues the masked ninja, who summons the Nine Tails to attack Konoha. As Minato arrives in Konoha and warps away the Nine Tails' Tailed Beast Bomb, Tobi engages Minato in a battle of teleportation until Minato cleverly defeats his opponent with his Rasengan while applying the contract seal to remove control of the Nine Tails.
249	7	"Thank You"; Transliteration: "Arigatō" (Japanese: ｢ありがとう｣)	Chikara Sakurai	Junki Takegami	Masayuki Kouda	February 9, 2012	July 5, 2014
Though freed from Tobi's control, the masked ninja considering it a minor setback, the vengeful Nine Tails continues wreaking havoc as Hiruzen and the ninja work to force the tailed beast out of the village. But Minato returns to the city and employs Gamabunta to restrain the Nine Tails long enough for him to teleport it along with his family to the village outskirts. After Kushina binds the Nine Tails in her chakra chains, intending to absorb the tailed beast back into her body with the process killing her. But Minato points out the flaw as the Nine Tails would eventually reconstitute itself and cause a power vacuum, revealing his intention of sacrificing himself to stop the chaos Tobi intends to create. Minato uses the Reaper Death Seal to take the yin half of the Nine Tails into himself so the weakened Tailed Beast can be sealed within Naruto. When the Nine Tails makes a last ditch attempt to break free, Minato and Kushina sacrifice themselves to take a death blow meant for their son. After imprinting chakra-based manifestations of themselves to aid Naruto in taming the Nine Tails, Minato and Kushina bid their son farewell.
250	8	"Battle in Paradise! Odd Beast vs. The Monster!"; Transliteration: "Chinjū VS Kaijin! Rakuen no Tatakai!" (Japanese: 珍獣VS怪人! 楽園の戦い!)	Kiyomu Fukuda	Masahiro Hikokubo	Ik-Hyun Eum	February 16, 2012	July 12, 2014
Kushina's chakra imprint finally departs from Naruto's psyche and Naruto promises himself that he will train hard and surpass the previous Hokage in pursuit of his dream to become the next Hokage. Naruto wakes up and displays his new ability to assume Nine Tails Chakra Mode, his ability to sense negative emotions, allowing him to sense Kisame from Samehada. Revealing that Ay and Bee killed a decoy while he hid himself within Samehada until the time is right while taking Killer Bee's chakra, Kisame escapes with the intent to inform Tobi of the Jinchurikis' location. But he ends up facing Guy, who mistook the Akatsuki member as his reflection, losing Sameheda to Bee despite using his weapon to replenish his chakra while escaping. Guy manages to intercept Kisame as he was about to give a scroll to a shark, defeating the chakra-absorbing villain with his technique Hirudora.
251	9	"The Man Named Kisame"; Transliteration: "Kisame to Iu Otoko" (Japanese: 鬼鮫という男)	Directed by : Ken'ichi Nishida; Storyboarded by : Yutaka Kagawa	Shin Yoshida	Kumiko Horikoshi	February 23, 2012	July 19, 2014
After being defeated by Guy, Kisame is restrained by Yamato so Aoba can gather intel. Aoba peered in Kisame's memory of killing a cipher team per his assignment when their capture by Hidden Leaf Ninja is immediate, later killing his superior to take his place among the Seven Swordsmen while learning the Fourth Mizukage Yagura Karatachi is controlled by an unmasked Tobi. Before Aoba can see Tobi's face, Kisame bit his tongue to regain consciousness and breaks out of his restrains to create a water dome around himself. Having joined the Akatsuki because Tobi promised him a world without lies, remembering Itachi's words of how one finds self-worth at the moment of their death, Kisame allows himself to be devoured by his shark summons. The group is impressed by Kisame's resolution towards his comrade that Guy finally acknowledges Kisame. But when they open the scroll Kisame intended to deliver, they trigger a trap and are contained in water prisons as a summoned shark spirits the scroll away.
252	10	"The Angelic Herald of Death"; Transliteration: "Shi e Izanau Tenshi" (Japanese: 死へいざなう天使)	Hayato Date	Katsuhiko Chiba	Hiroyuki Yamashita	March 1, 2012	July 26, 2014
Having left the Akatsuki, Konan remembers an event from her past while Jiraiya lived with her, Nagato, and Yahiko. Konan then senses Tobi arriving to the Hidden Rain Village to retrieve Nagato's Rinnegan, having expected him as she takes him to the outskirts while explaining Nagato's resting place is not in the village. While fighting Konan as she denounces him for stealing the Akatsuki from them, still perplexed by why she and Nagato sided with Naruto, Tobi reveals that he influenced Yahiko while claiming that as Madara, he gave Nagato his eyes. Konan refuses to hand Nagato over to Tobi as she transforms into thousands into paper bombs to take the masked ninja out, only for both to survive with the masked ninja's right arm destroyed and his mask partially damaged. Konan responds that she has placed the faith in fallen friends' ideal to Naruto, revealing the sea under them to hold six hundred billion paper bombs.
253	11	"The Bridge to Peace"; Transliteration: "Heiwa e no Kakehashi" (Japanese: 平和への懸け橋)	Directed by : Yuusuke Onoda; Storyboarded by : Yoshihiro Sugai	Katsuhiko Chiba	Hiromi Yoshinuma	March 8, 2012	August 2, 2014
Konan uses her six hundred billion paper bombs against Tobi to exploit the limits of his teleportation and intangibility jutsu to assure his death, exhausting most her chakra in the process. But Tobi thwarts the gambit by using Izanagi at the cost of his left eye, impaling Konan while explaining the technique's similarities to the Rinnegan through Senju and the Uchiha clans both being descendants of the Sage of Six Paths. Declaring himself as Madara Uchiha, the Second Sage of the Sixth Paths who perfectly assimilated Hashirama's cells, Tobi defeats Konan and while denouncing her faith in Naruto as foolish. Tobi then uses his remaining Sharingan to force her into revealing the location of Nagato and Yahiko's tomb before ending her life. Once obtaining Nagato's corpse, Tobi returns to the Akatsuki's base where he repairs his body and changes into new attire before Zetsu presents Kisame's intel on the jinchurikis' location.
254	12	"The Super Secret S-Rank Mission"; Transliteration: "Doesu-kyū Gokuhi Ninmu" (Japanese: ドS級極秘任務)	Kanryou Kishikawa	Yasuyuki Suzuki	Kengo Matsumoto	March 15, 2012	August 9, 2014
Naruto begins his top secret S-rank mission as an animal surveyor, still unaware that it is actually a distraction to keep him in the dark about the upcoming war while the island itself is revealed to be a giant turtle. Naruto's task to get the animals into a shelter results in him encountering a stowaway Condor and getting caught in a spat among the giant animals smitten over a giant armadillo. At the Akatsuki hideout, Kabuto reveals what he knows of Project Tsuki no Mi and his desire to experiment on Zetsu while convincing Tobi to let him go after the jinchuriki and Yamato. Tobi accepts the proposition, taking Kabuto to a chamber where the Gedo Statue rests on a flower with an unconscious clone of Hashirama Senju's body fused into it. Tobi reveals the flower's roots hold a preserved army of 100,000 White Zetsu, created from the captive tailed beasts' chakra and ready for deployment. When the five Kage learn that the Akatsuki now know the jinchurikis' whereabouts, Onoki offers to travel to the island alongside his bodyguards. Onoki intercepts Kabuto and the reanimated Deidara on the way.
255	13	"The Artist Returns"; Transliteration: "Geijutsuka Futatabi" (Japanese: 芸術家再び)	Directed by : Hideki Takayama; Storyboarded by : Toshiyasu Furukawa	Yasuyuki Suzuki	Ken'ichi Hirata & Kouji Furuya	March 22, 2012	August 16, 2014
With the giant turtle intercepted by the Manda clone he created from the original, Kabuto has Deidara use a bomb to flip the turtle on its back to immobilize it after they eluded Onoki. Inside the turtle's shell, Yamato, Motoi, and Aoba convince Naruto to continue his animal survey while they investigate. As Onoki and Akatsuchi lure Deidara away from the turtle so the Tsukikage can safely use his Particle Style, the arrival of Yamato's group allows Kurotsuchi's Quicklime jutsu to ensnare Kabuto. But as Aoba attempts to extract information from him, Kabuto reveals to have lulled the group into a false sense of security as he sheds his skin to become a monster that spirits Yamato away into Manda II's nostril before falling back to Deidara's dismay. Tobi, having replaced his left eye with one of Nagato's, is assured of Kabuto's intentions of using Yamato's cells in modifying the White Zetsu.
256	14	"Assemble! Allied Shinobi Forces!"; Transliteration: "Shūketsu! Shinobi Rengōgun!" (Japanese: 集結! 忍連合軍!)	Hisashi Ishii	Masahiro Hikokubo	Hong Rong & Yuuko Ishizaki	March 29, 2012	August 23, 2014
Onoki transports the giant turtle safely back to the Hidden Cloud Village, while Killer Bee starts training Naruto. At the outskirts of the Akatsuki hideout, Tokuma discovers the White Zetsu Army with his Byakugan and relays the intel to the Five Kage. The Allied Shinobi Forces are then assembled into five battle platoons based on their combat specialty, as well as 3 support platoons: Intelligence, Medical/Logistics and Reconnaissance. Gaara assumes the position of Captain of Battle Squad Four, and Commander in Chief of all five battle units. Meanwhile, Kabuto summons his army of reanimated ninja that include deceased Akatsuki members, previous Kage, the most recent Jinchuriki of the captive tailed beasts, and other powerful ninja. With both the reanimated ninja and a fully-modified White Zetsu Army, Tobi and Kabuto head out to commence the Fourth Great Ninja War.
Recap: Two Fates
257	15	"Meeting"; Transliteration: "Deai" (Japanese: 出会い)	Directed by : Shigeki Kawai; Storyboarded by : Shinji Satou	Junki Takegami	Kayano Tomizawa	April 5, 2012	August 30, 2014
Years before the Fourth Great Ninja War, a young Naruto paints the villager's houses and runs away while hearing them complain. Later, when Hiruzen comes to his house to give him his allowance, Naruto asks him about his late parents. But the Third Hokage refuses to answer. A few years later, while in the Academy, Naruto meets Sasuke Uchiha and is continuously defeated by him while noticing the hatred in his eyes during one sparring session. Shortly after that, Naruto finds out that Sasuke is the only survivor of the Uchiha Clan Massacre. After graduating, Naruto and Sasuke are placed on the same team along with Sakura Haruno and manage to pass Kakashi Hatake's bell test. As they go to their mission to Land of Waves, they are attacked and Naruto gets injured. To everyone's dismay, Naruto pierces his own hand to remove the venom and vows to never need to be saved again.
258	16	"Rivals"; Transliteration: "Raibaru" (Japanese: ライバル)	Kiyomu Fukuda	Junki Takegami	Ik-Hyun Eum	April 12, 2012	September 6, 2014
During the Chunin Exams, Team 7 is ambushed by a ninja named Shiore, who is revealed to be Orochimaru in disguise as he managed to place his Curse Mark on Sasuke. During that time, unnerved by Naruto's courage while he was initially fearful for his life, Sasuke is further surprised when he sees Naruto defeat the Hidden Rain gennin while they were accompanying Kabuto. During the third phase of the exam, Sasuke confesses his desire to face Naruto in combat, and asks Kakashi to teach him the Chidori.
259	17	"Rift"; Transliteration: "Kiretsu" (Japanese: 亀裂)	Directed by : Noriyuki Abe; Storyboarded by : Shinji Satou	Junki Takegami	Kumiko Horikoshi	April 19, 2012	September 13, 2014
When the Chunin Exams by the invasion of the Hidden Sand in alliance to Orochimaru, Sasuke is overpowered by a jinchuriki named Gaara of the Sand who mocks his lack of hatred. This resulted in Sasuke being saved by Naruto as he manages to defeat Gaara. Later, while continuing his training, Sasuke learns of Itachi's location and tries to avenge his clan. Easily defeated by his brother, Sasuke is once again accused of lacking hatred and is saved by the legendary ninja Jiraiya. Upon being healed by Tsunade, Sasuke confronts Naruto to see whether he has the power to defeat him. Although the fight is stopped by Kakashi, Sasuke is once again surprised by the power of Naruto's newly learned Rasengan. That night, Sasuke is ambushed by Orochimaru's bodyguards, the Sound Four, who invite him to join Orochimaru and gain more power.
260	18	"Parting"; Transliteration: "Ribetsu" (Japanese: 離別)	Directed by : Yuusuke Onoda; Storyboarded by : Yoshihiro Sugai	Katsuhiko Chiba	Hiromi Yoshinuma	April 26, 2012	September 20, 2014
Sasuke leaves the village alongside the Sound Four to go to Orochimaru, with Naruto joining a retrieval team composed of its leader Shikamaru, his teammate Choji, Kiba, and Neji. Only Naruto is able to reach Sasuke as the other members of the retrieval group each end up fighting a member of the Sound Four, killing the remaining members and their fifth Kimimaro with the aid of Gaara and his siblings. Having gained new powers from the full potential of Orochimaru's Cursed Mark, Sasuke attempts to kill Naruto in a fight that results with the latter taps more into the Nine-Tails chakra. With Naruto and Sasuke at their peaks of power, the two unleash their strongest attacks with Sasuke the victor as he leaves to meet with Orochimaru. However, despite losing his friend, Naruto refuses to give up on Sasuke and intends to get him back.
Nine-Tails Taming and Karmic Encounters
261	19	"For My Friend"; Transliteration: "Tomo no Tame ni" (Japanese: 友のために)	Directed by : Naoki Horiuchi; Storyboarded by : Masahiro Hosoda	Masahiro Hikokubo	Konomi Sakurai & Naoki Takahashi	May 3, 2012	September 27, 2014
After he and Tobi mobilize their army, Kabuto captures Anko when she sends her teammates to relay their intel to the Allied Shinobi Forces. Meanwhile at the Hidden Cloud Village, ninjas from different villages started arguing each other until Gaara gives a speech on how Naruto enabled him to discard his hatred and accept him as a friend. Gaara finishes by stating that they all stand as one shinobi to protect Naruto from the Akatsuki. The argument stops, ninjas start forgiving each other and everyone praises Gaara. After the speech, the Allied Shinobi Forces now mobilize towards the enemy.
262	20	"War Begins"; Transliteration: "Kaisen!" (Japanese: 開戦!)	Directed by : Masaaki Kumagai; Storyboarded by : Yutaka Kagawa	Shin Yoshida	Masayuki Kouda	May 10, 2012	October 4, 2014
Kankuro leads the Allied Shinobi Forces' Commando Unit consisting of Sai, Omoi, the Hidden Leaf's Taji, and the Hidden Stone's Ittan into enemy territory and set up a perimeter to locate Kabuto so they can force him into breaking the Reanimation Jutsu. But they are ambushed by a unit overseen by Deidara and Sasori who have captured Anko's subordinates with Muta Abarame being manipulated by the latter as a suicide bomber with Taji wounded attempting to save him as Ittan sinks their outpost to avoid the blast. Tokuma and Ranka descend to attack Kankuro's unit until Omoi feints an attack on Deidara to cut Sasori's chakra strings, saving Tokuma and Ranka while Kankuro pulls Sasori down as Ittan raises their outpost. As Sai joins the fray and recognize his brother Shin with the enemy, Kankuro recalls his last clash with Sasori while meeting the puppet master in his true form before summoning Sasori's puppet body to settle things.
263	21	"Sai and Shin"; Transliteration: "Sai to Shin" (Japanese: サイとシン)	Hisashi Ishii	Shin Yoshida	Hong Rong, Yuuko Ishizaki & Hiroki Abe	May 17, 2012	October 11, 2014
Sasori gloats to have finally gained his ideal immortal body before the battle between the two divisions resumes, Shin revealed to have Deidara's explosion clay inside him as he is manipulated by Sasori to attack. Though Kankuro sacrifices Salamander to encase Shin and contain the blast, Shin's body reconstitutes with Deidara gloating to continually use him as a bomb. Deidara's remark enrages Sai as he knocks him and Sasori out of the air and into Kankuro's awaiting puppets, with Omoi using his lightning style to defuse Deidara's clay. Though Sai expected to fight Shin, his brother instead departs for the afterlife as seeing the finished drawing of both him and Sai holding hands broke the Reanimation jutsu's hold on him. Sasori also departed after being moved by Kankuro's speech of how he obtained immortality through the puppets he created, entrusting the younger ninja with his Mother and Father puppets so they can be passed them down to the next generation. As Kabuto senses the loss of Sasori and Shin, Tobi begins to suspect Kabuto is playing him and the Allied Shinobi against each other.
264	22	"Secrets of the Reanimation Jutsu"; Transliteration: "Edo Tensei no Himitsu" (Japanese: 穢土転生の秘密)	Kiyomu Fukuda	Yasuyuki Suzuki	Ik-Hyun Eum	May 24, 2012	October 18, 2014
Killer Bee attempts teaching Naruto to use the Tailed Beast Bomb, Gyuki briefly taking over to explain the risks of Naruto prolonging his Nine Tails Chakra Mode or using clones while in that state. When Naruto learns the Rasengan was modeled after the Tailed Beast Bomb, he undergoes training to figure out the right dosage of yin and chakra to use. Meanwhile, insisting he needs Anko alive to siphon Orochimaru's chakra from her, Kabuto complies with Tobi's insistence to explain the Reanimation Jutsu's workings. Tobi provides Torune and Fu and snaps the former's neck, Kabuto explaining the process while making incapacitated Fu into the vessel for a reanimated Torune. Kabuto adds that he cannot summon the first four Hokage whose souls are currently contained within the Reaper Death Seal, revealing that the jutsu can be undone by its user. Meanwhile, Ao detects a large number of White Zetsu moving underground with Kitsuchi and Kurotsuchi use their Erupt jutsu to flush them out.
265	23	"An Old Nemesis Returns"; Transliteration: "Shukuteki to no Saikai" (Japanese: 宿敵との再会)	Directed by : Yuusuke Onoda; Storyboarded by : Yoshihiro Sugai	Shin Yoshida	Yukiko Iwata	May 31, 2012	October 25, 2014
Sai, Omoi, and Zaji are grounded by a group of advancing reanimated ninja which Zabuza and Haku are members of, Kakashi's division arriving in time to save them. While the other reanimated ninja are revealed to be the Hiddan Sand's Scorch-Style user Pakura and the Hidden Stone's explosion ninja Gari, Kakashi and Sakura recognize Zabuza and Haku as the former reveals to their former enemies how they influenced Naruto while giving Haku closure of Zabuza's final moments. But Kabuto removes Zabuza's group of their free will as Zabuza and Haku ask Kakashi to stop them, gaining reinforcements in former members of the Seven Ninja Swordsmen of the Mist.
266	24	"The First and Last Opponent"; Transliteration: "Saisho no Teki, Saigo no Teki" (Japanese: 最初の敵, 最後の敵)	Kanryou Kishikawa	Shin Yoshida	Kayano Tomizawa	June 7, 2012	November 1, 2014
Suigestu explains the Seven Ninja Swordsmen of the Mist to Jugo, mentioning his brother Mangetsu and the group's strongest members who Kabuto had reanimated, Kakashi's group face the swordsmen as Mangetsu summoned their weapons. Gari and Pakura run off while Zabuza uses his mist so the other swordsmen can pick off the ninja. Kakashi forms a plan to remove Zabuza from the fight, but history repeats itself with Haku blocking while Kakashi dodges Zabuza's fully restored Executioner's blade. Remembering how Naruto spoke of them after their mission ended, Kakashi defeats Zabuza so he and Haku can be quickly sealed. Telling Sai that his sealing jutsu is next, a livid Kakashi picks up the Executioner's Blade with the intent to go all out. Meanwhile the Second Division battle the White Zetsu while Gaara's division are about to face their opposition in the form of the reanimated Second Tsuchikage Mu.
267	25	"The Brilliant Military Advisor of the Hidden Leaf"; Transliteration: "Konoha no Tensai Gunshi" (Japanese: 木ノ葉の天才軍師)	Directed by : Hideki Takayama; Storyboarded by : Yutaka Kagawa	Masahiro Hikokubo	Ken'ichi Hirata & Kouji Furuya	June 21, 2012	November 8, 2014
Mu proceeds to summon the Kage that Kabuto reanimated, explaining their situation while arguing with Second Mizukage Gengetsu Houzuki over the duel that killed them years ago. They are surveyed by Gaara, who sees the group to include his father: the Fourth Kazekage Rasa. Meanwhile, the Allied Shinobi Forces headquarters learn Darui's coastline division will be facing the White Zetsu and a powerful reanimated ninja group consisting of Kakuzu, Tsunade's former lover Dan Kato, Neji's father Hizashi Hyuga, and the Gold and Silver Brothers Kinkaku and Ginkaku. Ay is dissaded from joining the fight by his strategist Shikaku Nara, who reformulated a battle formation so all divisions can acquire ample support. But Onoki decides to join Gaara's forces to counter the threat Mu presents in being both undetectable and possessing a Kekkei Tota like himself.
268	26	"Battleground!"; Transliteration: "Sorezore no Gekisen!!" (Japanese: それぞれの激戦!!)	Hisashi Ishii	Masahiro Hikokubo	Hong Rong, Yuuko Ishizaki & Hiroki Abe	June 28, 2012	November 15, 2014
Black Zetsu arrives to the fortified palace that the Feudal Lords have gathered at, intending to take them hostage. But Black Zetsu falls back after finding the Lords were fake and maintains his surveillance on the ground. Meanwhile at the coastline, the White Zetsu and the reanimated ninja attack as Hizashi confronts his brother Hiashi while reiterating that his death was for their clan's sake. At the desert, Shikamaru receives orders from headquarters to assist Darui's division while Temari is concerned over their division facing a powerful Kekkei Tota shinobi. While Onoki joins up with the Fourth Division, Darui faces Kinkaku and Ginkaku.
269	27	"Forbidden Words"; Transliteration: "Enu-Jī Wādo" (Japanese: NGワード)	Directed by : Katsumi Ono; Storyboarded by : Kiyomu Fukuda	Masahiro Hikokubo	Bum-Chul Chang, Hye-Jung Hue & Hong-Kun Park	July 5, 2012	November 22, 2014
Ay explains to Tsunade that Kinkaku and Ginkaku are two of the Hidden Cloud's most feared criminals, having nearly killed Tobirama when they attacked him during the peace conference with the Second Raikage. Ay also reveals the brothers use items belonging to the Sage of the Six Paths like the Bashosen war fan which utilizes all five Chakra natures, able to endure the items' use from ingesting some of the Nine Tails's chakra. Through Samui and Atsui assist Darui in fighting them, the brothers trap them in the Benihisago gourd through using a combo involving the Kokinjo rope that reveals one's spirit word and the Shichiseiken blade that curses it. Darui manages to change his spirit word when he almost got himself sealed, stealing the brothers' tools and trapping Ginkaku inside the Benihisago. But this provokes Kinkaku into entering his pseudo-Jinchuriki mode.
270	28	"Golden Bonds"; Transliteration: "Konjiki no Kizuna" (Japanese: 金色の絆)	Directed by : Shigeki Kawai; Storyboarded by : Atsushi Nigorikawa	Masahiro Hikokubo	Masayuki Kouda	July 19, 2012	November 29, 2014
Kinkaku transforms into a pseudo-Nine-Tails in response to his brother being sealed, overpowering Darui's division. At the headquarters, Ay's handpicked secretary Mabui uses her object teleportation jutsu to transfer the sealing pot known as the Kohaku no Johei to Darui's group as they are joined by Shikakumaru and half of the Fourth Division. Darui manages to seal Kinkaku with Team Asuma's help before Kakuzu arrives and reveals his side's own their gold and silver pieces in the form of Dan Kato and a reanimated Asuma Sarutobi.
Standalone side story
271	29	"Road to Sakura" (Note: Stylized in all caps)	Directed by : Yuusuke Onoda; Storyboarded by : Yutaka Kagawa & Jun'ya Koshiba	Yuka Miyata	Eiichi Tokura & Yukiko Iwata	July 26, 2012	December 6, 2014
After strolling through the outlying forest of the village, Ino looks up and sees Sakura falling through the sky. She brings her back to Konoha and Tsunade checks on Sakura, who determines she has developed amnesia. As they go through the village, and encounter the other members of the Konoha 11, Sakura notes that they look vaguely familiar but not as how she remembered them. Later when Sakura realizes that she had lost a necklace of a cherry blossom she had around her neck, she and Ino begin searching frantically for it. Her parents, Kizashi and Mebuki end up finding a dazed Sakura and her father returns the necklace to her. Remembering parts of her past, Sakura runs to embrace her parents, crying. Though this puzzles her parents greatly, they depart telling her to come home later. Sakura ends up telling Ino that it was likely that she was not the Sakura she knew before disappearing again in a bright light, leaving Ino severely confused.
Nine-Tails Taming and Karmic Encounters
272	30	"Mifune vs. Hanzō" (Japanese: ミフネVS半蔵)	Directed by : Tsuneo Tominaga; Storyboarded by : Noriyuki Abe	Katsuhiko Chiba	Hiroki Abe, Min-Seop Shin & Boo-Hee Lee	August 2, 2012	December 13, 2014
As the Surprise Attack Division attempt to retreat to the rendezvous point, they are chased by Akatsuki's reinforcements. Summoning his salamander Ibuse, Hanzō orders it to attack. Unleashing a paralyzing mist of poison, the division is rendered paralyzed and left at Hanzō's mercy. However, Mifune and his division soon arrive and he deflects the would-be devastating blow. Conversing about the past and the paths they had chosen to walk, as the two trade blows, Mifune is able to break Hanzō's sickle and respirator. Remembering his encounter with Mifune in life, Hanzō moves towards his broken kusarigama and using the blade commits seppuku, telling Mifune that he entrusts him with his conviction. This act cuts the poisonous sac that had been in Hanzō's body since he was a child, and causes the poison to leak out and evaporate. Shocking Kabuto Yakushi, Hanzō's body ceases to respond to his orders and the legendary shinobi is soon bound and sealed.
273	31	"True Kindness"; Transliteration: "Hontō no Yasashisa" (Japanese: 本当 の優しさ)	Kanryou Kishikawa	Yasuyuki Suzuki	Kanayo Tomizawa	August 9, 2012	December 20, 2014
Izumo and Kotetsu arrive and bind Kakuzu long enough to be sealed by Darui while Team Asuma proceed to face their mentor, recalling their previous spar with Asuma while genin with Choji lectured about his kindness. Shikamaru also recollects his past in protecting his comrades and Ino thinking about Asuma's last words which she must guide Shikamaru and Choji. Upon reaching Asuma after other ninja attempted to subdue him, the group engage their mentor with Choji holding back his punches. After a flashback of Choji, Asuma begs the trio especially for Choji to stop him.
274	32	"The Complete Ino-Shika-Cho Formation!"; Transliteration: "Kanpeki na Inoshikachō!!" (Japanese: 完璧な猪鹿蝶!!)	Kiyomu Fukuda	Yasuyuki Suzuki	Ik-Hyun Eum	August 9, 2012	December 27, 2014
Team Asuma's reunion with their sensei Asuma continues as Choji somewhat loses his will to fight. Ino manages to enter Choji's mind and tells that the meaning of their earrings that Asuma gave to them years ago. After Shikamaru recalling Asuma's last words, he scolded Choji and telling that they are not the ones to be protected but to stand up and protect others. After remembering his promise to be the Akimichi clan's next head and butterfly that started as kind caterpillar, a fully resolved Choji uses his Calorie Control to enter a slimming Butterfly mode. The trio then manage to defeat Asuma, who comments on their perfected Ino-Shika-Cho formation while being sealed.
275	33	"A Message from the Heart"; Transliteration: "Kokoro no Naka no Tegami" (Japanese: 心の中の手紙)	Directed by : Mitsutaka Noshitani; Storyboarded by : Jun'ya Koshiba	Shin Yoshida	Min-Seop Shin, Yuuko Ishizaki & Hideyuki Yoshida	August 16, 2012	January 3, 2015
Naruto attempts the leaves the training hall, but is blocked by shinobi guards under Shibi Aburame. Iruka arrives and attempts to fool Naruto, only for the youth to escape the cave in Sage Mode. Naruto is restrained via a shadow jutsu as he senses the war and everything, and Iruka continues to convince Naruto. Iruka gives Naruto's headband and attempts to restrain Naruto, but Naruto overpowers the group and leaves. Naruto finds a letter from Iruka in his headband, telling him to return alive. Bee follows after Naruto at Iruka's behest, the two jinchuriki destroying the Barrier Corps' invisible blockade.

== Home media release ==
=== Japanese ===
Volume	Date	Discs	Episodes	Reference
1	October 3, 2012	1	243–247	
2	November 7, 2012	1	250–253	
3	December 5, 2012	1	254–256, 261	
4	January 9, 2013	1	262–265	
5	February 6, 2013	1	266–270	
6	March 6, 2013	1	271–275	

=== English ===
Viz Media (North America – Region 1/A)
Box set	Date	Discs	Episodes	Reference
19	July 8, 2014	2	232–244	
20	October 14, 2014	2	245–257	
21	January 20, 2015	2	258–270	
22	April 21, 2015	2	271–283	

Viz Media (North America, Region 1 Blu-ray sets)
Volume	Date	Discs	Episodes	Ref.
9	January 26, 2026	4	221–248	
10	May 19, 2026	4	249–276	

Manga Entertainment (United Kingdom and Ireland – Region 2/B)
Volume	Date	Discs	Episodes	Reference
19	October 13, 2014	2	232–244	
20	February 9, 2015	2	245–257	
21	August 10, 2015	2	258–270	
22	September 14, 2015	2	271–283	

Madman Entertainment (Australia and New Zealand – Region 4/B)
Collection	Date	Discs	Episodes	Reference
19	August 20, 2014	2	232–244	
20	January 7, 2015	2	245–257	
21	March 11, 2015	2	258–270	
22	June 10, 2015	2	271–283	
