= Naruto: Shippuden season 14 =

Naruto: Shippuden
- Season 14
- DVD cover for the Shippuden story arc titled The Fourth Great Ninja War: Assailants From Afar
- No. of episodes: 25

Release
- Original network: TV Tokyo
- Original release: January 17 – July 4, 2013

Season chronology
- ← Previous; Season 13 Next → Season 15

The fourteenth season of the anime television series Naruto: Shippuden is based on Part II of Masashi Kishimoto's Naruto manga series. The season follows Naruto Uzumaki helping the ninja alliance fight against Kabuto's army. The season was directed by Hayato Date, and produced by Pierrot and TV Tokyo. The season aired from January to July 2013.

The English dub of the season began airing on Neon Alley on May 30 to November 21, 2015. The season would make its English television broadcast debut on Adult Swim's Toonami programming block and air from May 17 to December 6, 2020.

The DVD version was released on September 4, 2013, under the title of The Fourth Great Ninja War: Assailants From Afar (忍界大戦・彼方からの攻撃者, Ninkai Taisen: Kanata kara no Kōgekisha).

The season contains five musical themes between two openings and three endings. The opening themes are "Moshimo" performed by Daisuke (used for episodes 296 to 306) and "Niwaka Ame ni mo Makezu" (ニワカ雨ニモ負ケズ; "Not Even Sudden Rain Can Defeat Me") performed by Nico Touches the Walls (used for episodes 307 to 320). The ending themes are "Sayonara Memories" (さよならメモリー, Sayonara Memorī) performed by 7!! (used for episodes 296 to 306), "I Can Hear" performed by Dish (used for episodes 307 to 319) and "Yume o Idaite ~Hajimari no Crissroads~" (夢を抱いて～はじまりのクリスロード～; "Embrace Your Dreams ~Crissroads of the Beginning~") performed by Rake (used for episode 320).

== Episodes ==
No. overall	No. in season	Title	Directed by	Written by	Animation directed by	Original release date	English air date
The Fourth Great Ninja War: Assailants From Afar
296	1	"Naruto Enters the Battle!"; Transliteration: "Naruto, Sansen!!" (Japanese: ナルト、参戦!!)	Directed by : Jun Nakagawa; Storyboarded by : Shinji Satou	Yasuyuki Suzuki	Beom-Seok Hong	January 17, 2013	May 30, 2015
As Naruto Uzumaki and Bee enter the war, they defeat the White Zetsu Army. Quickly turning the tides of the war, the powerhouse duo make short work of the opposition thanks to Naruto's new ability. Naruto sends several clones to the battle fronts. Naruto and Bee then arrive just to save Musai and Nonata from a reincarnated Toroi, who is promptly sealed. Meanwhile, the Logistical Support and Medical Division's compound is at a standstill with no one allowed to go near the central tent where Shizune and Sakura Haruno were conducting their autopsy. Through research they were able to gather more information which they pass along to HQ. Elsewhere on the Fourth Division's battlefield, the reincarnated Kage draw ever closer to Gaara and Ōnoki's location. Alerted by Mū, that two persons were approaching, the Kage are greeted by an enormous torrent of sand which the Second Mizukage animatedly comments about. Believing it to be the work of Shukaku, the Fourth Kazekage quickly stops the sand using his Gold Dust, causing the Third Raikage to acknowledge him as a Magnet Release kekkei genkai wielder. Shocked to not see the beast before him but actually his son, three of the four Kage are captured by sand arms created by Gaara. Mū who was able to avoid capture, is however soon set upon by Ōnoki using the Particle Style: Atomic Dismantling Jutsu to which the previous Tsuchikage responds in kind, the effects of which leaves a giant crater in the middle of the battlefield. Questioning his son as to where the One-Tail was, as the rest of the Fourth Division lingered a ways back awaiting the signal, Gaara informs his father that he was no longer the jinchūriki he had made him.
297	2	"A Father's Hope, A Mother's Love"; Transliteration: "Chichi no Omoi, Haha no Ai" (Japanese: 父の想い、母の愛)	Directed by : Mitsutaka Noshitani; Storyboarded by : Yutaka Kagawa	Shin Yoshida	Hiroki Abe, Min-Seop Shin & Yuuko Ishizaki	January 24, 2013	June 6, 2015
As the opposing sides converse, the Fourth Kazekage is shocked to learn that Gaara was no longer the host of the One-Tail, and even more so that he had friends and had become the Kazekage. Intent on testing his son's mettle, the two begin battling while Ōnoki signalled the troops to move in before confronting Mū. As the battle waged on, the Fourth Kazekage is shocked to find himself trapped in Gaara's attack alongside the Second Mizukage and the Third Raikage. Seeing the sand manifest in the form of his late wife after protecting Gaara from one of his attacks, the former Kazekage realizes that Karura had been protecting Gaara his whole life. Remorsefully, the Kazekage tells his son the truth of his mother's love for him and apologized; that all he had done for Gaara was rob him of happiness, now realizing that he had actually been unable to judge the true value of things in the end. Shocked to hear the truth of his mother's love for him and what Yashamaru had been forced to lie to Gaara and say, the young Kazekage breaks down crying. Gaara would later tell his father that while his mother was truly amazing, it was his father who had finally given him medicine to heal his wounded heart. With Gaara forgiving him for his past mistakes, the Fourth smiles on as he is sealed away by his son, entrusting the village, and the future to his son.
298	3	"Contact! Naruto vs. Itachi"; Transliteration: "Tsuini Sesshoku!! Naruto tai Itachi" (Japanese: ついに接触!! ナルトVSイタチ)	Directed by : Sumito Sasaki; Storyboarded by : Jun'ya Koshiba	Yasuyuki Suzuki	Mamoru Yokota, Yukiko Iwata, Eiichi Tokura & Hiroyuki Kamura	January 31, 2013	June 13, 2015
As they travel slowly towards an unknown destination, Nagato and Itachi wonder who they were going to be forced to fight before crossing paths with Naruto and Killer Bee. Seeing an opportune moment to capture the Jinchuriki, Kabuto interrupts the reunion to have Itachi attack. As they clash, Itachi learns from Naruto that Sasuke Uchiha knows the truth behind the Uchiha Clan Massacre and asks his opponent not to reveal this information to any one else as Nagato joins the fray. Though puzzled, Nagato was forced to attack and the battle between the four shinobi ensue. Retreating atop Nagato's Giant Drill-Beaked Bird, Itachi activates his Mangekyō Sharingan causing the crow he placed in Naruto to emerge from the shocked youth's mouth. Casting Amaterasu, Itachi incinerates Nagato's summons as well as Nagato himself, revealing that the crow possesses the surgetically embedded eye of Shisui Uchiha, which was rigged to react to Itachi's Mangekyo Sharingan and cast Kotoamatsukami: which had the order "protect Konoha". Now freed from Kabuto's control, Itachi explains that this was the power he had given to Naruto and had intended it for Sasuke. During this explanation, however, Nagato's corpse was able to regenerate. And Kabuto, excited by the prospect of acquiring Shisui's eye, had Nagato attack with his Giant Snake-Tailed Chameleon. Managing to absorb some of Bee's Eight Tails chakra, Nagato is restored to his youthful-looking self as he captures Naruto and prepares to remove his soul.
299	4	"The Acknowledged One"; Transliteration: "Mitomerareshi Mono" (Japanese: 認められし者)	Directed by : Hidetoshi Takahashi; Storyboarded by : Takayuki Inagaki	Yasuyuki Suzuki	Ik-Hyun Eum	February 7, 2013	June 20, 2015
As Naruto fights to clutch onto his soul that the now-revitalized Nagato was attempting to remove from his body, Bee arrives at their location and attempts a surprise attack but it is foiled by the shared field-of-vision Nagato has with the Giant Snake-Tailed Chameleon and the King of Hell which had been summoned to store the young man's soul. In the clutches of Nagato's mechanical arms with a cannon pointing at him in point-blank range, the two jinchūriki are saved by Itachi and his Susanoo. Nagato, however, quickly regenerates and uses Chibaku Tensei with the intent of crushing his targets into the planetary body. Though Naruto raised the alarm that there was little they could do against this technique, Itachi rallies the group and has them use their most powerful long ranged attacks to target the center of the sphere, effectively neutralizing the attack. In the aftermath of this, Itachi is able to pierce Nagato with his Totsuka Sword freeing the Rinnegan-wielder from Kabuto's control. With the time he had left, Nagato lamented the fact that he had sullied the brilliant legacy their master had left behind and told Naruto to be the most amazing end to the trilogy that he could be. With this, Naruto tries to move out to the battlefield, but his Nine-Tails Chakra Mode wears off leading Itachi to tell him to not rely solely on his own power, but to put some trust in his comrades and their own power. After telling Bee to take care of Naruto, Itachi incinerates the crow with Shisui's Sharingan and departs to deal with the person controlling the reincarnated shinobi.
300	5	"The Mizukage, the Giant Clam, and the Mirage"; Transliteration: "Mizukage to Ōhamaguri to Shinkirō" (Japanese: 水影と蜃(おおはまぐり)と蜃気楼)	Directed by : Shigeki Kawai; Storyboarded by : Shinji Satou	Katsuhiko Chiba	Masaya Onishi	February 14, 2013	June 27, 2015
The Second Mizukage and the Third Raikage manage to escape Gaara's sealing jutsu and battered the shinobi platoon. As the former Kages relay their strengths and weaknesses, the Second Mizukage summons a giant clam that creates a mirage. Gaara leaves the platoon to face Mu and the shinobi platoon had no choice but to fight the Second Mizukage. Onoki and Mu trade blows to each other until Gaara arrives to assist Onoki. Shocked, Gaara sees Naruto delivering Mu with his Planetary Rasengan which Mu quickly evades but with the support of Gaara, Naruto manages to land his new Rasengan jutsu to Mu. Just as Mu to be sealed, Mu utters a warning yet the sealing stops his talking. Meanwhile, the Second Mizukage argues with the platoon that they should not attack what they see him and the clam. Gaara arrives and manages to sense the location of the giant clam and Onoki delivers a powerful Earth style punch despite running low on chakra. However Onoki gets exhausted and the Second Mizukage appears on his behind with the index finger pointing at Onoki's back. The Second Mizukage shoots Onoki with a water gun jutsu developed by the Hozuki clan.
301	6	"Paradox"; Transliteration: "Mujun" (Japanese: 矛盾)	Hisashi Ishii	Masahiro Hikokubo	Hiroki Abe, Min-Seop Shin & Yuuko Ishizaki	February 21, 2013	July 4, 2015
As the Fourth Division's attacks prove futile against the Third Raikage, he re-emphasizes how they were to attack him. Temari and a few other tessenjutsu users attack the Third with the Wind Release: Cast Net technique which appears to have finally incapacitated the Raikage, but as shinobi from the Sealing Team move in to bind him, they are sent reeling. Spotting his former aide Dodai amongst the Allied Shinobi Forces' ranks, he steps forward and tells Temari a bit more about the Raikage and noted that they needed a more powerful Wind Release technique to attack him. Noting that there was not a more powerful Wind Release user amongst their ranks or even in the Alliance, Naruto's shadow clone arrives, announcing that he would be able to do the job. Leaping into action, Naruto forms a Rasenshuriken which after some manipulation, finally lands an attack on the Raikage which proves to be just as futile. Retreating as the Third's persona, Dodai instructed the Earth Release users to erect a wall which he himself fortifies. Telling his comrades to retreat nonetheless, his words fall on deaf ears as the Raikage breaks through the wall using his Hell Stab. As the division is set upon again, Naruto and Dodai discuss the legacy of the Raikage leading Naruto to want to know how the Third got the scar on his body which was noted to be the "ultimate shield". Needing to ask the Eight-Tails directly, Dodai creates a distraction which the Third chases, buying them time to contact Inoichi Yamanaka who patches them through to Bee. Upon hearing of the monstrous battle between the Third and the Eight-Tails, Naruto formulates a strategy using Sage Mode as his cloak had dissipated due to attempting to make a Tailed Beast Ball. Ultimately, the Third ends up stabbing himself with his One-Finger Nukite, and his body begins to disintegrate and he is eventually bound and sealed. Dodai surmises that in the end, no one person could have the strongest shield and spear, noting that in the end, the Third had the strongest spear. Naruto agrees, noting that Gaara of the Sand probably had the strongest shield. Meanwhile on Gaara's battlefield, the division struggle to defeat the Second Mizukage.
302	7	"Terror: The Steam Imp"; Transliteration: "Kyōfu: Jōki Bōi" (Japanese: 恐怖・蒸危暴威(ジョウキボーイ))	Directed by : Kanryou Kishikawa; Storyboarded by : Yukihiro Matsushita	Junki Takegami	Kumiko Horikoshi	February 28, 2013	July 11, 2015
Ōnoki is revealed to be a sand clone shocking the Second Mizukage as the sand rose up to seal him. However, before the tags can be completely applied, Gaara's Desert Layered Imperial Funeral explodes and the Mizukage's ominous face appears in the sky above them. As hail begins to fall, Ōnoki explains that this was not genjutsu again, but the Second's Steaming Danger Tyranny technique. As a chibi-like clone forms before them and begins to attack the Fourth Division, Gaara sets out to find the real Mizukage who, as the Tsuchikage noted, had been left severely weakened after using this technique. Finding him, Gaara moves to immediately seal the Mizukage, but once again before the seals can be applied, the clones intervenes this time, ripping them off the sand pyramid. Popping his head out from atop the pyramid, the Second greets his opponents serenely before ducking back in to avoid a volley of shuriken launched at him. Commenting that this was a good spot to hide, the Mizukage tells the Kazekage and Tsuchikage that he would no longer divulge the mechanisms behind his techniques, because if they were unable to defeat him, they had no hope of taking on the opposition's leader. Narrowly protecting his division from another explosion, Gaara then directly takes on the clone and is successfully able to stop the clone after using a mixture of his sand drenched in hail and his father's gold dust to both halt the clones movements and stop it from exploding by keeping it cool. Greatly impressed by this feat, the Second beams at Gaara stating that he and Naruto who had made his way to the battlefield eventually made a good combination. Before being sealed, the Second declares that he had found the golden egg amongst the current Kage after all. Elsewhere on the battlefield, it is revealed that before being sealed away, Mū had split himself in half. Unable to free his other half, Kabuto contemplates his next move which would buy him enough time to summon his trump card. On the Alliance's side, everything has come to a standstill in the face of the threat of the White Zetsu Army clones infiltrating their ranks, especially at the Logistical Support and Medical Division.
303	8	"Ghosts from the Past"; Transliteration: "Kako no Bōrei" (Japanese: 過去の亡霊)	Directed by : Kazunori Mizuno; Storyboarded by : Yukihiro Matsushita	Masahiro Hikokubo	Masayuki Kouda	March 7, 2013	July 18, 2015
With the Allied Shinobi Forces on high alert because of the imposters within their midsts, their worries are further added to when Otogakure's Sound Four is reincarnated on the battlefield. The members of Konoha's disbanded Sasuke Retrieval Team, however, make short work of these opponents, displaying just how much they had grown over the years despite the amplification of their opponent's cursed seals. However, the Alliance's cheers of victory are soon stifled as a seal activates around the defeated shinobi and Kiba, Akamaru, Neji, Shikamaru, and Chōji. Elsewhere, as he moves towards the location, Naruto senses the malevolence on the battlefield and rushes towards his friends' location.
304	9	"The Underworld Transfer Jutsu"; Transliteration: "Yomi Tenshin no Jutsu" (Japanese: 黄泉転身(よみてんしん)の術)	Directed by : Yoshihide Ibata; Storyboarded by : Shinji Satou	Masahiro Hikokubo	Min-Seop Shin & Yuuko Ishizaki	March 14, 2013	July 25, 2015
As Neji, Shikamaru, Chōji, Kiba, and Akamaru regroup to assess their situation, on the other side their friends frantically try to figure out what is wrong with them. Realizing that they are all still alive but left in a form of suspended animation with weak pulses and lethargic chakra flow, Shino and Ino do what they can to keep their comrades' chakra flowing, while requesting word be sent to HQ about the situation. Elsewhere, within the barrier erected by the Sound Four, the Konoha shinobi battle it out once again for their lives. News soon reaches Ino and Shino from Inoichi that their comrades are in something akin to a genjutsu state and that the only way to save them is to locate and recall their souls somehow although not even the sensory barrier at HQ is able to locate their souls. Elsewhere as Naruto rushes towards his friends' location, he encounters a group of shinobi, and takes out a transformed White Zetsu Army clone. After affirming that there were no more enemies in the group, Naruto moves on as there were no shinobi from the Communications Team there. Despite the fact, however, that the Konoha shinobi seem to have the upper hand in their battle against the Sound Four, their enemies regroup and tell them that their efforts are futile against immortals and then informs them that even if somehow they are defeated, there will be no escaping from the barrier; leaving the Konoha shinobi with two seemingly no-win options: die by their hands within the barrier or wait until their bodies in the real world eventually give out, and die regardless.
305	10	"The Vengeful"; Transliteration: "Fukushūsha" (Japanese: 復讐者)	Directed by : Jun Nakagawa; Storyboarded by : Naomi Nakayama	Masahiro Hikokubo	Ken'ichi Hirata, Kouji Furuya & Min-Ho Jang	March 21, 2013	August 8, 2015
As the search to find their comrades' souls become frantic, as both Shino and Ino will themselves to continue keeping their comrades alive, within the barrier, the battle wages on between the Sound Four and the members of the disbanded Sasuke Retrieval Team. Meanwhile on the battlefield, Naruto is finally able to get in touch with HQ after finally finding someone from the Communications Team. When told that there was nothing that could be done as there was no-one in the Allied Shinobi Forces that could sense souls, Naruto lashes out at Shikaku for his seeming indifference to the welfare of his own son, but Shikaku merely notes that as the Chief Strategist of the Alliance, it was his duty to keep a level head and coordinate their efforts on the battlefield. Back within the barrier, as the Konoha-nins' efforts seem even more wasted, they are further perplexed by Shikamaru's constant aggravation of their opponents amidst their seemingly coordinated attacks. The Sound Four's true intention are soon revealed, as they note that they had become more powerful by carrying a vengeful will which was empowering them beyond their imagination, believing that Orochimaru was the one to have reincarnate them. This soon proves to be their undoing as their ill-will festered and grew to tremendous levels, seeping out of the barrier, allowing Naruto to pin-point their location. Realizing the rationale behind Shikamaru's indirect and aggravating attacks, on the other side of the barrier Naruto creates an enormous Rasen-Shruiken and successfully destroys the barrier, freeing his comrade's souls which return to their bodies while defeating the Sound Four. Back in their bodies, the Alliance is overjoyed to see their comrades alive and well. Conversely, however, Naruto worries, that negative feelings were still festering all over on the battlefield.
306	11	"The Heart's Eye"; Transliteration: "Kokoro no Me" (Japanese: 心の目)	Directed by : Shigeki Kawai; Storyboarded by : Shinji Satou	Shin Yoshida	Kayano Tomizawa & Masaya Onishi	March 28, 2013	August 15, 2015
As the remnants of the White Zetsu Army are eradicated one by one, the Hyūga cousins, Neji and Hinata fight side by side with Hinata protecting the newly-recuperated Neji. During this time, Hinata remembers the time that Neji protected her when they were younger: Neji was left in charge of Hinata's training as her father Hiashi had left the village on other duties. During the grueling training, Hinata's eyesight became severely strained and she is put on bed-rest by a doctor in order to recover. Not wanting Hinata to miss the fireworks that she had made plans to attend with Team Kakashi, Neji goes to seek out the Eyebright plant that is fabled to grow in the Valley of Judgement, despite being advised against it. Accompanied by Naruto and Sakura, they make their way to the valley, where they are beset upon by humanoid creatures, without faces. Though they initially put up a valiant effort to stave them off, it starts becoming increasingly apparent that they it would become a battle of attrition until Might Guy and Kakashi Hatake make a surprise appearance and send the creatures scurrying away. After explaining why they are there, Kakashi notes that the search for the plant is futile and with that they all return to the village. Later, during the fireworks display, Hinata sits on her verandah for the display. In present time she reveals to Neji that Naruto and Sakura had told her the lengths he went through to help her, and had always wanted to thank him. With that, they resolve to defeat the enemy until Naruto arrives on the battlefield.
307	12	"Fade into the Moonlight"; Transliteration: "Gekkō ni Kiyu" (Japanese: 月光に消ゆ)	Directed by : Sumito Sasaki; Storyboarded by : Yoshihiro Sugai	Yuka Miyata	Miho Yoshioka	April 4, 2013	August 22, 2015
With a break in the fighting, the Allied Shinobi Forces tend to the dead and injured. The Logistical Support and Medical Division camp is ablaze with activity as medical-nin try their best to save their comrades. Elsewhere, Kabuto notes the body count climbing and decides to take further action. Summoning a confused Hayate Gekkō, Kabuto fills him in on what had happened leading up to and after his death. At the medical camp, the corpses of shinobi with kekkei genkai and clans deemed important are being documented and sealed away to be returned after the war. Wanting to take the opportunity to collect samples, Kabuto reincarnates a Sand and Cloud shinobi to form a team with Hayate. This team infiltrates the medical division's camp and causes mayhem on the ground. There they steal the KIA scroll that was being formulated by the medics. As they make their escape, the medics form a team to pursue them in order to retrieve the list. With the request that Yūgao join the team, she protests that she could not, as Hayate was her former lover.
308	13	"Crescent Moonlight"; Transliteration: "Mikazuki no Yoru" (Japanese: 三日月の夜)	Directed by : Hidetoshi Takahashi; Storyboarded by : Yukihiro Matsushita	Yuka Miyata	Ik-Hyun Eum	April 11, 2013	August 29, 2015
Yūgao thinks about the time she used to spar with Hayate, learning kenjutsu as she and the search party hunt for Hayate's team. When they find them the sealing team quickly takes out the other members of Hayate's team and continue over to Hayate. But they get injured in the process of protecting Yūgao from Hayate's blow. They escape and get tended to their wounds. It is learnt that they cannot carry on further owing to their wounds. Yūgao explains to Sakura why she cannot fight anymore. But Sakura says that they had to fight because of the "unforgivable" technique that Kabuto has used to wage this war and goes to retrieve the scroll on her own. During the fight she is saved from a death blow from Hayate by Yūgao who had decided to step in. Yūgao tells Sakura to fetch the sealing corps. The fight ensues during which Hayate commends Yūgao on her improvement in swordsmanship. During the fight Kabuto senses the delay and tries to take over Hayate's consciousness who seemingly pins Yūgao to a tree but in fact is saved by the efforts of Hayate to take back control and gets himself pierced by Yūgao's sword and falls. He is finally sealed and everyone returns to the medical camp.
309	14	"The A-Rank Mission: Food Fight"; Transliteration: "Ē-Ranku Ninmu: Gozen Jiai" (Japanese: A級任務・御膳試合)	Directed by : Mitsutaka Noshitani; Storyboarded by : Yutaka Kagawa	Katsuhiko Chiba	Min-Seop Shin & Yuuko Ishizaki	April 18, 2013	September 5, 2015
Naruto arrives to help a team of Allied Shinobi Forces led by Karui, who are struggling against a reanimated samurai, whom Naruto recognizes as a man named Tatewaki he met on a previous mission. Naruto has a flashback to when Tsunade assigned Team 10 and Naruto to go to the Land of This and kidnap Shū, the son of the Feudal Lord under a treaty. Shikamaru formulates a plan to capture the Shū by having Chōji enter an eating contest at the Land of This' castle and get second place. Chōji speeds through the competition, and before the final round, Ino uses her Mind Transfer Jutsu to take control of Shū and goes to the washroom in the castle, where Naruto uses his Transformation Technique to transform into Shū. When Shū is able to re-enter his body, he asks who Shikamaru is and Shikamaru explains the mission to him. Meanwhile, before Chōji can win the final round of the eating contest, Shikamaru uses the Shadow Possession Jutsu to stop Chōji from eating the last BBQ chicken and giving him in second place after Isono.
310	15	"The Fallen Castle"; Transliteration: "Rakujō" (Japanese: 落城)	Masaaki Kumagai	Katsuhiko Chiba	Yasuhiko Kanezuka & Seiko Asai	April 25, 2013	September 12, 2015
Team Asuma succeeds in bringing Shū into custody, where they secure a room at an inn for the night. Elsewhere Naruto continues to act as Shū's double and has a hard time going through his daily duties. As Akatsuki members Deidara and Sasori bicker while nearing their destination, the real Shū gets the opportunity to relax and enjoy things he was previously not able to. However, Naruto's cover is soon blown as Tatewaki and Chiyo realize he was not the real Shū, and Naruto is forced to explain everything to them when his escape is foiled. However, no sooner is the Land of This assaulted by Sasori's hundred puppets and Deidara's explosive creations. Confronting Sasori and reprimanding him for his actions, Tatewaki noted that even though the daimyō for the country was dead, his allegiance to him was never-ending. Ultimately Tatewaki lost his life, having been poisoned by Sasori's Puppet Technique: Prosthetic Arm Senbon. Later, as the Akatsuki members pull out, Yamato watches from a distance noting that overall the mission went well. Back in present time, Tatewaki learns that Chiyo and Shū were safe and moving around with the other Feudal Lord under the protection of the Feudal Lord Protection Squad. Relieved to hear this Tatewaki stops struggling and though wishing he could see them once again, his soul is released to the afterlife, and his body begins to crumble.
Standalone side story
311	16	"Prologue of Road to Ninja" (Note: Stylized in all caps)	Kazunori Mizuno	Yuka Miyata	Kengo Matsumoto	May 2, 2013	September 19, 2015
Tobi speaks with Zetsu about testing out a limited, trial-version of the "Infinite Tsukuyomi", but first notes that he needs to find what the target of the technique desires. Using the Crystal Ball Jutsu, Tobi finds Naruto Uzumaki in his apartment, bored and playing cards with two shadow clones. Meanwhile, Team Guy returns from a mission, with Tenten suggesting a trip to the public bath. Rock Lee declines her offer stating that he needed to train. During his training, he came across Naruto who was still in his apartment sulking and had the idea to invite him and the rest of their friends to the public bath. In the baths, Sakura asks Hinata to loosen up, only for her to complain about her sizeable bust, much to Sakura's envy. While the girls bathed, Naruto told the guys that Lee would come after his training. Akamaru, who had sneaked into the bath house as a transformed Kiba, got soap all over the floor, which caused Chōji to slip and roll into the bath. This caused some of the water to flow out and prompted Shikamaru to have Chōji use the Expansion Justu in order to get the water level back up. While training on what was the top of the female changing area, Lee falls through the ceiling, getting himself caught by an angry Ino. Naruto, who decided to try to peek at the girls despite Neji's warning, witnessed their angry reactions at Lee, accusing him of being a pervert. Naruto, however, knew that Lee gathered everyone together so that Naruto wouldn't be alone and stood up for him. However, unbeknownst to Naruto, a bra got stuck to the back of his towel, causing Sakura to beat him up thinking he was being a panty thief. With the trip essentially ruined, Naruto returned to his apartment, still sulky. Later that night, however, the guys came to Naruto's apartment for a game of cards and after they left, Naruto felt depressed as he wished they had stayed for dinner. Deciding this was enough, Tobi declared that he now knows Naruto's desires and, surrounded by seemingly all the other members of Akatsuki, began the limited version of Infinite Tsukuyomi.
The Fourth Great Ninja War: Assailants From Afar
312	17	"The Old Master and the Dragon's Eye"; Transliteration: "Rōjin to Ryū no Me" (Japanese: 老人と龍の目)	Directed by : Naoki Horiuchi; Storyboarded by : Yutaka Kagawa	Hideto Tanaka	Hirokazu Ishino, Naoki Takahashi & Ichirou Ogawa	May 9, 2013	September 26, 2015
Still searching thoroughly for any remaining factions of the enemy, the Third Division came across another reincarnated shinobi: Master Chen — a renowned hero of the Hidden Leaf who was thought to have died during the Third Shinobi World War. As Might Guy who is happy at the prospect on challenging such a famed taijutsu master, Konoha's Sublime Green Beast of Prey soon finds himself being forced on the defensive by the old man. A shinobi is able to break away from the battle and in his search for reinforcements, finds Rock Lee who rushes to Guy's aid. Seeing the legend he met once before as a genin before him, Lee reveals his history with Chen before engaging the legend in battle. Ultimately, Lee is able to counter Chen's Leaf Dragon God technique, using the One-Man Front Lotus which he had engineered to counter the rotation of the winds of the former. As Chen's immortal body disintegrates, he remembers the time when he had his own student who was incapable of using ninjutsu, and how he had died during the Third Shinobi World War. With that, he notes that it was high time his grave served a purpose. With tears streaming down his face, Lee noted that he would bring offerings of rice balls to his grave.
313	18	"Rain Followed by Snow, with Some Lightning"; Transliteration: "Ame Nochi Yuki, Tokidoki Kaminari" (Japanese: 雨のち雪, ときどき雷)	Directed by : Kanryou Kishikawa; Storyboarded by : Yukihiro Matsushita	Yasuyuki Suzuki	Masaya Onishi	May 16, 2013	October 3, 2015
As the shinobi stationed where the sealed Dan Katō is battle the remaining factions of the White Zetsu Army, it suddenly begins raining on the battlefield. Shikamaru spots a shinobi amongst the White Zetsu clones and wonders whether it was yet another reincarnated shinobi. Joined by Chōji, and Ino the trio are shocked to see the familiar face of Yota whom they had met when they were younger. Elsewhere, at the Logistical Support and Medical Division, Sakura also confronts Yota, around whom it is snowing, Kiba and Akamaru also encounter Yota as well, this one, however, creating lightning storms. As each group remembers their time with the young man, they formulate a way to defeat him on the battlefield. Elsewhere, Naruto who is making his way to the battlefield, notices the three different weather phenomenon's happening in the different locations and wonders just what is going on.
314	19	"The Sad Sun Shower"; Transliteration: "Kanashī Tenkiame" (Japanese: 悲しい天気雨)	Directed by : Fumiaki Usui; Storyboarded by : Yutaka Kagawa	Yasuyuki Suzuki	Kouji Furuya, Ken'ichi Hirata & Min-Ho Jang	May 23, 2013	October 10, 2015
Still struggling to find a way to deal with the reincarnated Yota, having resorted to dodging his attack, Ino contacts her father and requests that he patch them through to their comrades. There it is revealed that Sakura, Kiba, and Akamaru were also dealing with Yota. Shocked as to exactly what was going on, the shinobi struggle to find a way to seal Yota as they had done the other reincarnated shinobi. As they remember more of their time as children with Yota, Naruto also encounters a Yota who conjures gusts of wind with each whistle he makes. Ultimately, it is revealed that Konoha's ANBU captured Yota and took him in for questioning. With this, Naruto notes that it was their fault that Yota had died.
315	20	"Lingering Snow"; Transliteration: "Nagoriyuki" (Japanese: 名残雪)	Hisashi Ishii	Yasuyuki Suzuki	Min-Seop Shin, Hiroki Abe & Yuuko Ishizaki	May 30, 2013	October 17, 2015
Discovering that there are four Yota in different battlefields, and recognizing Yota's whistling as the one he had taught him, Naruto informs the others that the Yota they're fighting are in fact disguised White Zetsu, freeing them from the guilt of attacking Yota, resulting in the Zetsu being defeated. Remembering the past, Yota was being held by the ANBU for questioning, the ANBU sensing something wrong with Yota. Naruto acts a decoy for Shikamaru, Kiba, Akamaru, Ino, Chōji and Sakura to sneak in. Shikamaru manages to temporarily paralyze the ANBU, but they soon get the upper hand. About to attack Naruto, Yota acts out and strikes the ANBU with his lightning. Naruto and the others try to get Yota across a river so he can get away, but they all get separated by the strong currents. Yota saves Naruto, but begins drowning. They try to talk to Yota, but he erases their memories of him and their time together. During the war, Yota reveals he was already dead when they first met, having been one of the earliest subjects of the Impure World Reincarnation when Orochimaru began testing it. Yota tells them about how his clan travelled selling weather, which they could control, and how despite being particularly good at it, Yota's body was frail, leading to an early death. Yota covers himself in snow, causes lightning to strike him, leaving Naruto and the others shocked.
316	21	"The Reanimated Allied Forces"; Transliteration: "Edo Tensei Rengōgun!!" (Japanese: 穢土転生連合軍!!)	Directed by : Sumito Sasaki; Storyboarded by : Yukihiro Matsushita	Katsuhiko Chiba	Miho Yoshioka	June 6, 2013	October 24, 2015
In an attempt to recover his most powerful pawns, Kabuto reincarnates some of his weakest dead soldiers to ambush the Allied Shinobi Forces. He uses Torune to summon them. The White Zetsu appears in the battlefield, and he realizes that those were the Impure World Reincarnation's failures. After the battle that took place, the Shinobi Alliance notices that those reincarnated shinobi were probably D-rank. Between the reincarnated shinobi, some are Shinobi Alliance troops' long gone friends and families. Osoi, who was Toroi's former partner and Musai's father, makes them aware of Kabuto's plan to rescue his stronger pawns. Conscious about the plan, the Allied Shinobi Forces informs the HQ that some reincarnated shinobi are after the Third Raikage. Torune is leading the reincarnated fugitive team that took vantage from Heiji's Swirling Smoke Jutsu to escape the Shinobi Alliance. When they find the sealed Third Raikage, an unknown reincarnated starts running to release the tag, ending up being caught in the Sealing Tag Barrier. Daimaru uses his Earth Style: Sand Dance to get rid of the tags, when they got near the Third Raikage's sealing tag, Chūkaku throws a rosary to the tag and starts praying, when the sealing tag was about to break, Temari appears and attacks Chūkaku before he can break the sealing tag. That's when Daimaru shows up in front of Temari, declaring his love for her. Later on after a long conversation between Temari and Daimaru, the Shinobi Alliance Forces seals Daimaru, Temari attacks the last reincarnated shinobi, Torune, that is hiding behind a rock. With a second and direct attack, Temari realizes that Torune is long gone, leaving a clone in front of her. Kabuto gets surprised with Torune's skills and intends to use him to be successful in his demand.
317	22	"Shino vs. Torune!"; Transliteration: "Shino tai Torune!!" (Japanese: シノVSトルネ!!)	Directed by : Shigeki Kawai; Storyboarded by : Atsushi Wakabayashi	Katsuhiko Chiba	Kumiko Horikoshi	June 13, 2013	October 31, 2015
After escaping from the Shinobi Alliance, a reincarnated Torune finds a place far enough to execute a unique kinjutsu to his abilities. However, Shino is able to find him with his kikaichū. Notified from Torune's position, Shino starts a battle in order to stop Torune's kinjutsu. Once face to face with him, Torune asks if Shino made any friends, thinking back about their shared past. When they were little, Shibi was Torune's guardian after Shikuro died, Torune and Shino growing to act as siblings. Torune showed him his insects, and saved him from going to the Root by volunteering himself. Torune explains that he never thought he would get a friend like he did in the Root, Fū. In the battle, Torune takes advantage from his taijutsu learned at Root, unleashing an accurate kick to Shino's stomach. One of Naruto's clones appears and saves Shino from falling into Torune's kinjutsu. Shino shares his knowledge about the opponent's abilities, warning Naruto to not touch Torune's skin, thinking the only way his insects could spread their poison. Torune uses his Poison Cloud Justu to attack them from a distance, but it is blocked by Shino's insects. With the warning to not touch Torune's skin, Naruto starts fighting the reincarnated opponent, who tries to use kenjutsu against him, though Naruto succeeds in breaking his sword. Naruto manages to land a Rasengan, and Torune almost lands a punch on him, failing due to Shino putting himself in between them, taking the hit. Torune is confused that Shino isn't suffering the effects of his venomous insects, and Shino reveals that his punch hit Shino's insects, which Shino has bred with Torune's own insects after he was recruited into Root. This allowed them to build up a resistance against their venom. Shino uses these insects to paralyze Torune, and applies a sealing tag, stopping him and his kinjutsu.
318	23	"A Hole in the Heart: The Other Jinchuriki"; Transliteration: "Kokoro no Ana - Mō Hitori no Jinchūriki" (Japanese: 心の穴 もう一人の人柱力)	Directed by : Hiroaki Nishimura; Storyboarded by : Naoki Hishikawa	Shin Yoshida	Ik-Hyun Eum	June 20, 2013	November 7, 2015
Gyūki notifies B who had stopped for yet another bathroom break that Naruto was far ahead of them, to the beast's exasperation Motoi catches up to B and informed them that he had been sent to assist them. As they proceed towards the battlefield, a small faction of the White Zetsu Army nearby plotted an ambush on the duo. Kabuto who had also located B decided to enable another one of his special war potentials in order to capture Killer B. As the coffin emerges from underground comically uncovering the White Zetsu in the process the contents of the coffin is revealed to be Fukai, the previous jinchūriki of the Eight-Tails. As the two parties converse, Fukai advises them that he was not in control of his body and that they needed to escape but B notes that without Gyūki, he did not pose as much a threat as he would have. Fukai, however, enters Version 2, shocking B and Motoi. It is then revealed that it was Orochimaru's experiments and actions which brought about Fukai's death and Gyūki's rampage some thirty years prior. As the two men fight in their respective Version 2 states, it is revealed that Orochimaru had infiltrated Kumogakure, drugged Fukai, and extracted Gyūki who launched into a mindless rampage in order to collect some of the beast's cells. Ultimately, with some help from Motoi, Killer B is able to convey his feelings to Fukai who is glad to know that B had found something to fill the void left by being a jinchūriki. As his body deconstructed, Fukai ordered B to end the war. With this, B rushed towards the battlefield noting that his war had just begun.
319	24	"The Soul Living Inside the Puppet"; Transliteration: "Kugutsu ni Yadoru Tamashī" (Japanese: 傀儡に宿る魂)	Kazunori Mizuno	Masahiro Hikokubo	Masayuki Kouda	June 27, 2013	November 14, 2015
Somewhere in the forest near the battlefield, the Fifth Division led by Mifune is confronted by the reanimated Kimimaro and Chiyo. As he gives orders for his men to back off from the dangerous Kimimaro, Mifune finds himself in a predicament when Chiyo takes control of one of his samurai. Luckily, Kankuro arrives in time to release the samurai from Chiyo's control. Seeing Scorpion, a guilt ridden Chiyo recalls a time when her own means to communicate with Sasori was through her grandson's only friend Komushi who died from a defective invention and became a puppet at his mother's request. Returning to battle, Chiyo starts fighting with Kankuro gathering more samurai to assault Scorpion before Kankuro summons Mother and Father. Seeing Chiyo's shock as she realized she had not overcome the guilt, Kankuro reveals that Sasori entrusted the Mother and Father puppets to him for future generations. Starting to see memories of Sasori's early life and time with his parents, Chiyo admits that her grandson's puppets are in good hands before falling inert much to Kankuro's despair. But it was just a ruse as Chiyo resumes her attack.
320	25	"Run, Omoi!"; Transliteration: "Hashire Omoi" (Japanese: 走れオモイ)	Directed by : Kazuma Satou; Storyboarded by : Yukihiro Matsushita	Yasuyuki Suzuki	Min-Seop Shin, Yuuko Ishizaki & Hiroki Abe	July 4, 2013	November 21, 2015
Headquarters receives information that Omoi abandoned his post on the battlefield, and quickly contacts Kakashi, who confirms the information, A starts believing he could have deserted but Karui came in his defense putting that idea aside, Sai adding the extra information that he could be going towards the Seventh Front where the Amphibious Search and Destroy Unit was being bailed by the Thundercloud Unit that never got to its destination, and he was concerned with this supply unit composed by children. Omoi contacting the Headquarters promises to rescue the children in one hour. Hoping they were celebrating when he gets there, the Headquarters send a Naruto's clone to help him against the two thousand White Zetsu Army. When at the Seventh Front, Omoi only found Kirigakure-nin corpses and countless White Zetsu clones, Naruto's clone appears in time to help him against that many opponents, but an oversight of Omoi makes Naruto's clone disappear and he gets all alone again against multiple enemies. Advancing through the enemy defences, Omoi is faced with a White Zetsu affected by the red soil that expelled a poisonous smokescreen. On the other side was the Thundercloud Unit led by Yukai, hidden in a statue near a lake, resisting the enemy, while Omoi going in their rescue gets rid of various White Zetsu clones with a lightning bolt under the water they decide to come out and fight, side by side with Omoi they destroy all the enemies, A contacts Omoi and informs that he failed his one hour mission and is going to get punished for that.

== Home media release ==
=== Japanese ===
Volume	Date	Discs	Episodes	Reference
1	September 4, 2013	1	296–299	
2	October 2, 2013	1	300–303	
3	November 6, 2013	1	304–307	
4	December 4, 2013	1	308–311	
5	January 8, 2014	1	312–315	
6	February 5, 2014	1	316–320	

=== English ===
Viz Media (North America – Region 1/A)
Box set	Date	Discs	Episodes	Reference
23	July 28, 2015	2	284–296	
24	November 10, 2015	2	297–309	
25	January 26, 2016	2	310–322	

Viz Media (North America, Region 1 Blu-ray sets)
Volume	Date	Discs	Episodes	Ref.
11	August 11, 2026	4	277–304	
12	November 17, 2026	4	305–332	

Manga Entertainment (United Kingdom and Ireland – Region 2/B)
Volume	Date	Discs	Episodes	Reference
23	February 8, 2016	2	284–296	
24	April 4, 2016	2	297–309	
25	August 15, 2016	2	310–322	

Madman Entertainment (Australia and New Zealand – Region 4/B)
Collection	Date	Discs	Episodes	Reference
23	September 16, 2015	2	284–296	
24	January 13, 2016	2	297–309	
25	April 6, 2016	2	310–322	
