= List of Naruto volumes =

The cover of the first Naruto tankōbon released in Japan by Shueisha in March 2000.

The Naruto manga is written by Masashi Kishimoto and published by Shueisha in Weekly Shōnen Jump. The series focuses on titular hero and protagonist named Naruto Uzumaki, a ninja from the Hidden Leaf Village with supernatural ninjutsu abilities, who is the host of Nine Tailed Fox and dreams to become Hokage in order to receive respect from the villagers and to protect them from any upcoming threats. The series began its serialization in the issue 43 from 1999. Shueisha later collected these chapters in tankōbon bound volumes. The first 244 chapters are known as Part I, and constitute the first part of the Naruto storyline. All subsequent chapters belong to Part II, which continues the storyline from Part I after a two-and-a-half-year ellipsis. Viz Media licenses the Naruto manga for an English adaptation in North America, where it is serialized in the American Shonen Jump and released in volume format.

Several adaptations based on Naruto have been made, including two anime series and seven feature films. The first anime series, also titled Naruto, covers the entirety of Part I over 220 episodes. The second, named Naruto: Shippuden (ナルト 疾風伝, Naruto Shippūden; literally, Naruto: Hurricane Chronicles), is based on Part II. Both series are produced by Studio Pierrot and TV Tokyo, and air on TV Tokyo.

Shueisha has released 72 tankōbon in Japan, with the first 27 containing Part I, and the remaining 45 belonging to Part II. The first tankōbon was released on March 3, 2000, and the latest volume 72 was released on February 4, 2015. Additionally, from November 7, 2008, through April 10, 2009, Shueisha reprinted the entirety of Part I in a nine-volume sōshūhen set titled Naruto Sōshūhen: Uzumaki Daikan (NARUTO―ナルト―総集編 うずまき大巻; literally, Naruto Complete Collection: Uzumaki Megavolume).

Viz Media has released 72 volumes of the English adaptation of the manga, with volume 1 released on August 6, 2003, and volume 72 released on October 6, 2015. In order to compensate for the gap between the Japanese and English adaptations of the manga, Viz announced its "Naruto Nation" campaign, where it would release three volumes each month in the last four months of 2007 in order to close said gap. A similar campaign happened in 2009, entitled "Generation Ninja," with eleven volumes from Part II of the series to be released between February and April of that year in order to catch up to the Japanese serialization. Starting with the release of volume 45 in July 2009, Viz began to release Naruto volumes on a quarterly basis.

== Volumes ==
=== Part I ===
Part I covers the first 244 chapters of the Naruto manga and is contained in 27 tankōbon volumes. All 27 tankōbon have been released in Japan by Shueisha and in North America by Viz Media. Viz released volumes 16 through 27 over a four-month period as part of the "Naruto Nation" campaign, meant to close the gap between the Japanese and English versions of the manga.

No.	Title	Original release date	English release date
1	The Tests of the Ninja; Ninja no shiren (忍者の試練)	March 3, 2000; 978-4-08-872840-7	August 6, 2003; 978-1-56931-900-0
2	The Worst Client; Saiaku no irainin (最悪の依頼人)	June 2, 2000; 978-4-08-872878-0	December 17, 2003; 978-1-59116-178-3
3	Bridge of Courage; Yume no tame ni...!! (夢の為に...!!)	August 4, 2000; 978-4088728988	April 14, 2004; 978-1-59116-187-5
4	The Next Level; Eiyū no hashi!! (英雄の橋!!)	October 4, 2000; 978-4088730264	August 3, 2004; 978-1-59116-358-9
5	The Challengers; Chōsensha-tachi!! (挑戦者たち!!)	December 4, 2000; 978-4088730509	December 7, 2004; 978-1-59116-359-6
6	Predator; Sakura no ketsui!! (サクラの決意!!)	March 2, 2001; 978-4088730899	April 5, 2005; 978-1-59116-739-6
7	The Path You Should Tread; Susumubeki michi...!! (進むべき道...!!)	May 1, 2001; 978-4088731131	August 2, 2005; 978-1-59116-875-1
8	Life-and-Death Battles; Inochigake no tatakai!! (命懸けの戦い!!)	August 3, 2001; 978-4088731476	December 6, 2005; 978-1-4215-0124-6
9	Neji vs. Hinata; Neji to Hinata (ネジとヒナタ)	October 4, 2001; 978-4088731742	March 7, 2006; 978-1-4215-0239-7
10	A Splendid Ninja; Rippa na ninja...!! (立派な忍者...!!)	December 4, 2001; 978-4088731971	June 6, 2006; 978-1-4215-0240-3
11	Impassioned Efforts; Deshi'iri shigan!? (弟子入り志願 !?)	March 4, 2002; 4-08-873236-7	September 5, 2006; 978-1-4215-0241-0
12	The Great Flight!! Ōi naru hishō!! (大いなる飛翔!!)	May 1, 2002; 4-08-873259-6	December 5, 2006; 978-1-4215-0242-7
13	The Chûnin Exam, Concluded...!! Chūnin shiken, shūryō...!! (中忍試験、終了...!!)	August 2, 2002; 978-4088732985	March 6, 2007; 978-1-4215-1087-3
14	Hokage vs. Hokage!! 火影VS火影!!	November 1, 2002; 4-08-873341-X	May 1, 2007; 978-1-4215-1088-0
15	Naruto's Ninja Handbook! Naruto ninpōchō!! (ナルト忍法帖!!)	December 20, 2002; 4-08-873368-1	July 3, 2007; 978-1-4215-1089-7
16	Eulogy; Konoha kuzushi, shūketsu!! (木ノ葉崩し、終結!!)	March 4, 2003; 4-08-873394-0	September 4, 2007; 978-1-4215-1090-3
17	Itachi's Power; Itachi no chikara!! (イタチの能力!!)	May 1, 2003; 4-08-873420-3	September 4, 2007; 978-1-4215-1652-3
18	Tsunade's Choice; Tsunade no ketsui (綱手の決意!!)	August 4, 2003; 4-08-873493-9	September 4, 2007; 978-1-4215-1653-0
19	Successor; Uketsugumono (受け継ぐ者)	November 4, 2003; 4-08-873523-4	October 2, 2007; 978-1-4215-1654-7
20	Naruto vs. Sasuke ナルトvsサスケ!!	December 19, 2003; 4-08-873552-8	October 2, 2007; 978-1-4215-1655-4
21	Pursuit; Yurusenai!! (許せない!!)	March 4, 2004; 4-08-873573-0	October 2, 2007; 978-1-4215-1855-8
22	Comrades; Tensei...!! (転生...!!)	April 30, 2004; 4-08-873595-1	November 6, 2007; 978-1-4215-1858-9
23	Predicament; Kukyō...!! (苦境...!!)	August 4, 2004; 4-08-873639-7	November 6, 2007; 978-1-4215-1859-6
24	Unorthodox; Pinchi pinchi pinchi!! (ピンチ·ピンチ·ピンチ!!)	October 4, 2004; 4-08-873660-5	November 6, 2007; 978-1-4215-1860-2
25	Brothers; Itachi to Sasuke (兄と弟)	December 3, 2004; 978-4088736792	December 4, 2007; 978-1-4215-1861-9
26	Awakening; Wakare no hi...!! (別れの日...!!)	February 4, 2005; 4-08-873770-9	December 4, 2007; 978-1-4215-1862-6
27	Departure; Tabidachi no hi!! (旅立ちの日!!)	April 4, 2005; 4-08-873791-1	December 4, 2007; 978-1-4215-1863-3

=== Part II ===
The second half of the Naruto storyline, known as Part II, encapsulates all the chapters following chapter 244; specifically chapters 245–700, and is set two and a half years after the end of the Part I storyline. The English adaptation of Part II serialization in the American Shonen Jump on December 4, 2007, and the first volume was released on March 4, 2008. To catch up with the Japanese serialization, Viz Media released eleven volumes from Part II between February and April 2009, after which it began releasing Naruto on a quarterly basis.

==== Volumes 28–48 ====
No.	Title	Original release date	English release date
28	Homecoming; Naruto no kikyō!! (ナルトの帰郷!!)	June 3, 2005; 978-4-08-873828-4	March 4, 2008; 978-1-4215-1864-0
29	Kakashi vs. Itachi カカシVSイタチ!!	August 4, 2005; 978-4-08-873849-9	May 6, 2008; 978-1-4215-1865-7
30	Puppet Masters; Chiyo-bā to Sakura (チヨバアとサクラ)	November 4, 2005; 978-4-08-873881-9	July 1, 2008; 978-1-4215-1942-5
31	Final Battle; Takusareta omoi!! (託された想い!!)	December 26, 2005; 978-4-08-874002-7	September 2, 2008; 978-1-4215-1943-2
32	The Search for Sasuke; Sasuke e no michi!! (サスケへの道!!)	April 4, 2006; 978-4-08-874039-3	November 4, 2008; 978-1-4215-1944-9
33	The Secret Mission; Gokuhi ninmu...!! (極秘任務...!!)	June 2, 2006; 978-4-08-874108-6	December 16, 2008; 978-1-4215-2001-8
34	The Reunion; Saikai no toki...!! (再会の時...!!)	August 4, 2006; 978-4-08-874138-3	February 3, 2009; 978-1-4215-2002-5
35	The New Two; Aratanaru futarigumi!! (新たなる二人組!!)	November 2, 2006; 978-4-08-874273-1	February 3, 2009; 978-1-4215-2003-2
36	Cell Number 10; Daijippan (第十班)	December 27, 2006; 978-4-08-874288-5	February 3, 2009; 978-1-4215-2172-5
37	Shikamaru's Battle; Shikamaru no tatakai!! (シカマルの戦い!!)	April 4, 2007; 978-4-08-874338-7	February 3, 2009; 978-1-4215-2173-2
38	Practice Makes Perfect; Shugyō no seika...!! (修業の成果...!!)	June 4, 2007; 978-4-08-874364-6	March 3, 2009; 978-1-4215-2174-9
39	On the Move; Ugokidasumono-tachi (動き出す者たち)	August 3, 2007; 978-4-08-874397-4	March 3, 2009; 978-1-4215-2175-6
40	The Ultimate Art; Kyūkyoku geijutsu!! (究極芸術!!)	November 2, 2007; 978-4-08-874432-2	March 3, 2009; 978-1-4215-2841-0
41	Jiraiya's Decision; Jiraiya no sentaku!! (自来也の選択!!)	February 4, 2008; 978-4-08-874472-8	March 3, 2009; 978-1-4215-2842-7
42	The Secret of the Mangekyo; Mangekyō no himitsu...!! (万華鏡の秘密...!!)	May 2, 2008; 978-4-08-874512-1	April 7, 2009; 978-1-4215-2843-4
43	The Man with the Truth; Shinjitsu o shiru mono (真実を知る者)	August 4, 2008; 978-4-08-874552-7	April 7, 2009; 978-1-4215-2929-5
44	Senjutsu Heir; Senjutsu Denshō...!! (仙術伝承...!!)	November 4, 2008; 978-4-08-874589-3	April 7, 2009; 978-1-4215-3134-2
45	Battlefield, Konoha; Senjō, Konoha!! (戦場、木ノ葉!!)	February 4, 2009; 978-4-08-874627-2	July 7, 2009; 978-1-4215-3135-9
46	Naruto Returns; Naruto kikan!! (ナルト帰還!!)	May 1, 2009; 978-4-08-874663-0	October 6, 2009; 978-1-4215-3304-9
47	The Seal Destroyed; Fūin hakai!! (封印破壊!!)	August 4, 2009; 978-4-08-874711-8	February 2, 2010; 978-1-4215-3305-6
48	The Cheering Village; Kanko no sato!! (歓呼の里!!)	November 4, 2009; 978-4-08-874748-4	June 1, 2010; 978-1-4215-3474-9

==== Volumes 49–72 ====
No.	Title	Original release date	English release date
49	The Gokage Summit Commences; Gokage kaidan, kaimaku...!! (五影会談、開幕...!!)	January 4, 2010; 978-4-08-874784-2	October 5, 2010; 978-1-4215-3475-6
50	Water Prison Death Match; Suirō no shitō!! (水牢の死闘!!)	March 4, 2010; 978-4-08-870011-3	February 1, 2011; 978-1-4215-3497-8
51	Sasuke vs. Danzo! Sasuke VS Danzō...!! (サスケVSダンゾウ...!!)	April 30, 2010; 978-4-08-870033-5	June 7, 2011; 978-1-4215-3498-5
52	Cell Seven Reunion; Sorezore no Dainanahan!! (それぞれの第七班!!)	August 4, 2010; 978-4-08-870084-7	September 6, 2011; 978-1-4215-3957-7
53	The Birth of Naruto; Naruto no shusshō (ナルトの出生)	November 4, 2010; 978-4-08-870126-4	December 6, 2011; 978-1-4215-4049-8
54	Peace Viaduct; Heiwa e no kakehashi (平和への懸け橋)	December 29, 2010; 978-4-08-870143-1	January 3, 2012; 978-1-4215-4102-0
55	The Great War Begins; Taisen, Kaisen! (大戦、開戦!)	April 21, 2011; 978-4-08-870185-1	March 6, 2012; 978-1-4215-4152-5
56	Team Asuma, Reunited; Saikai, Asuma han! (再会、アスマ班!)	June 3, 2011; 978-4-08-870218-6	May 8, 2012; 978-1-4215-4207-2
57	Battle; Naruto senjō e...!! (ナルト戦場へ...!!)	August 4, 2011; 978-4-08-870271-1	July 10, 2012; 978-1-4215-4306-2
58	Naruto vs. Itachi ナルトVSイタチ!!	November 4, 2011; 978-4-08-870302-2	September 11, 2012; 978-1-4215-4328-4
59	The Five Kage; Gokage shūketsu...!! (五影集結...!!)	February 3, 2012; 978-4-08-870368-8	November 6, 2012; 978-1-4215-4942-2
60	Kurama 九喇嘛!!	May 2, 2012; 978-4-08-870417-3	February 5, 2013; 978-1-4215-4943-9
61	Uchiha Brothers United Front; Kyōdai, kyōtō!! (兄弟、共闘!!)	July 27, 2012; 978-4-08-870477-7	May 7, 2013; 978-1-4215-5248-4
62	The Crack; Hibi (皹)	October 4, 2012; 978-4-08-870515-6	August 6, 2013; 978-1-4215-5619-2
63	World of Dreams; Yume no sekai (夢の世界)	December 28, 2012; 978-4-08-870550-7	November 5, 2013; 978-1-4215-5885-1
64	Ten Tails; Jūbi (十尾)	April 4, 2013; 978-4-08-870628-3	January 7, 2014; 978-1-4215-6139-4
65	Hashirama and Madara; Hashirama to Madara (柱間とマダラ)	July 4, 2013; 978-4-08-870661-0	April 1, 2014; 978-1-4215-6455-5
66	The New Three; Aratanaru sansukumi (新たなる三竦み)	September 4, 2013; 978-4-08-870801-0	July 1, 2014; 978-1-4215-6948-2
67	An Opening; Toppakō (突破口)	December 4, 2013; 978-4-08-870849-2	October 7, 2014; 978-1-4215-7384-7
68	Path; Wadachi (轍)	March 4, 2014; 978-4-08-880023-3	December 2, 2014; 978-1-4215-7682-4
69	The Start of a Crimson Spring; Akaki haru no hajimari (紅き春の始まり)	May 2, 2014; 978-4-08-880054-7	March 3, 2015; 978-1-4215-7856-9
70	Naruto and the Sage of Six Paths; Naruto to Rikudō Sennin...!! (ナルトと六道仙人...!!)	August 4, 2014; 978-4-08-880151-3	June 2, 2015; 978-1-4215-7975-7
71	I Love You Guys; Daisuki da (大好きだ)	November 4, 2014; 978-4-08-880208-4	August 4, 2015; 978-1-4215-8176-7
72	Uzumaki Naruto うずまきナルト!!	February 4, 2015; 978-4-08-880220-6	October 6, 2015; 978-1-4215-8284-9
