= Naruto season 5 =

Naruto
- Season 5
- First Japanese home media volume cover of the season
- No. of episodes: 41

Release
- Original network: TV Tokyo
- Original release: April 12, 2006 – February 8, 2007

Season chronology
- ← Previous; Season 4 Next → Naruto: Shippuden season 1

The fifth and final season of the Naruto anime television series, labelled as the "5th Stage" in the Japanese DVD release, is directed by Hayato Date, produced by Studio Pierrot and TV Tokyo. Based on Masashi Kishimoto's manga series of the same name, the season follows Naruto Uzumaki and friends succeeding in their missions, and concludes with Naruto's journey in two-and-half-years training with Jiraiya. Following the original series finale, a sequel anime series which primarily adapts the second part of the manga, titled Naruto: Shippuden, premiered the following week on February 15, 2007. The season ran on TV Tokyo and its affiliates from April 12, 2006, to February 8, 2007.

It was the last season to air on Cartoon Network's incarnation of Toonami before its cancellation, as episode premieres shifted to regular network programming beginning on October 4, 2008. The final eleven episodes never aired on television in the United States, as Cartoon Network removed the series from its schedule before they could debut. The remaining eleven episodes of the English dub instead premiered in Canada on YTV's Bionix, from October 25 to December 6, 2009.

Sony Pictures Entertainment collected the episodes in a total of ten DVD volumes, each containing four episodes between January 1 and July 4, 2007. Viz Media's English adaptation of the series was collected in several DVD boxes from the series.

The season uses five musical themes for the Japanese version with two openings and three closings. The two opening themes are Flow's "Re:member" (used for episodes 180 to 202) and Hearts Grow's "Yurayura" (ユラユラ; lit. Swaying) for episodes 203 to 220. The three closing themes are "Yellow Moon" by Akeboshi (used for episode 180 to 190), "Pinocchio" (ピノキオ, Pinokio) by Oreskaband (used for episodes 191 to 202), and "Scenario" (シナリオ, Shinario) by Saboten (used for the rest of the episodes). The English episodes use the same openings, and an instrumental version of "Rise" by Jeremy Sweet and Ian Nickus as the closing theme.

== Episodes ==
No. overall	No. in season	Title	Directed by	Written by	Animation directed by	Original release date	English air date
Star Guard
180	1	"Hidden Jutsu! The Price of Ninja Art: Kujaku"; Transliteration: "Hijutsu - Kujaku Myōhō no Daishō" (Japanese: 秘術 孔雀妙法の代償)	Toshiya Niidome	Junki Takegami	Masaru Hyodo	April 12, 2006	July 5, 2008
It is revealed that the masked ninja who stole the star is Sumaru's mother, and that Akahoshi is the one who kidnapped Sumaru. The group learns that the star training is potentially fatal to the ninja who take part in it, but resolve to find the star. Tenten and Lee infiltrate Akahoshi's residence and rescue Sumaru. Meanwhile, Akahoshi forces Natsuhi to surrender the star in exchange for Sumaru. While Natsuhi gains the upper hand, Naruto and Neji intervene for Akahoshi, and Naruto manages to get close enough to punch Natsuhi. After he does, Akahoshi launches an attack at the two of them, dropping them into the Valley of Death.
181	2	"Hoshikage: The Buried Truth"; Transliteration: "Hoshikage - Hōmurisa-rareta Shinjitsu" (Japanese: 星影 葬り去られた真実)	Directed by : Kiyomu Fukuda; Storyboarded by : Shigenori Kageyama	Junki Takegami	Ik Hyun Eum	April 19, 2006	July 5, 2008
Akahoshi says that the mission for the Leaf ninja is over, but Neji says that the star must be recovered. Neji, Lee, and Tenten reveal the truth about Akahoshi to the trainees. Naruto awakens and hears about Natsuhi and her husband seeing the horrors of the star training, and trying to steal the star. After being caught, the Third Hoshikage agreed to end the star training if they left the village and watched from afar to prevent it from resuming. Natsuhi and her husband accepted, asking the Third Hoshikage to tell Sumaru that they had died. Akahoshi finds the star, and reveals that he killed the Third Hoshikage in order to resume the star training. He fights Natsuhi and absorbs his subordinates' chakra to grow stronger, but Naruto's teammates and the star trainees arrive.
182	3	"Reunion: The Remaining Time"; Transliteration: "Saikai - Nokosa-reta Jikan" (Japanese: 再会 残された時間)	Yūki Kinoshita	Junki Takegami	Zenjirō Ukulele	April 26, 2006	July 26, 2008
As Sumaru, the rest of the Star trainees and Naruto's teammates arrive, Akahoshi takes Sumaru hostage and forces Natsuhi to surrender the star. Neji examines Natsuhi and reveals that she could die if she uses her star chakra jutsus again. After Sumaru awakens, he speaks with his mother, who reveals that while she knew that she had to leave him behind to spare him the pain of becoming an exile, she regrets leaving him. While Naruto and Lee insist on going after Akahoshi, Neji says the mission is over and they, as Leaf ninja, cannot betray a client. That night, Natsuhi goes to the star temple to steal the star, but is killed by Akahoshi and his men. Sumaru, following with the Leaf ninja, senses her death and flies to the temple in all hurry. Akahoshi officially becomes the Fourth Hoshikage, and orders his army to kill the Leaf ninjas, Sumaru and Hokuto, if they return to the village.
183	4	"The Star's Radiance"; Transliteration: "Hoshi wa Kagayaki o Mashite" (Japanese: 星は輝きを増して)	Directed by : Hiroshi Kimura; Storyboarded by : Takafumi Hayashi	Junki Takegami	Minoru Morita	May 3, 2006	July 26, 2008
After Akahoshi tries to execute Sumaru, Hokuto and the rest of the children stand up to protect their village, revealing the truth about poison caused by the star. After learning all the truth, the adults changes his minds and turns on Akahoshi as well. After Akahoshi nearly kills Mizura, he is given no second chances. Not being one to lose, Akahoshi fuses his body with the Star, causing his chakra to go overload. Naruto, guided by Natsuhi's spirit, uses his Rasengan to destroy the star and defeats Akahoshi. Although Tsunade is upset at Naruto for failing the mission, she concedes that the mission was "trash" due to being ordered by Akahoshi himself, much to Naruto's relief as Tsunade heals the children of their poisoning.
Standalone side stories
184	5	"Kiba's Long Day"; Transliteration: "Inuzuka Kiba no Naga~i Ichinichi" (Japanese: 犬塚キバのなが～い一日)	Directed by : Hayato Goda; Storyboarded by : Rion Kujo	Kou Hei Mushi	Hidehiko Okano & Takenori Tsukuma	May 10, 2006	August 2, 2008
Naruto is assigned to watch Akamaru, Kiba Inuzuka's dog, who has recently been acting strangely after being infected by a special bacteria during a mission. This is confirmed when Akamaru begins to violently attack Konoha's inhabitants and the ANBU takes him into custody, being prepared to have Akamaru euthanized if they cannot cure him. However, this is too much for Kiba, and he rescues Akamaru, attempting to cure him alone. Naruto pursues Kiba, but he does not believe that he is helping him. Kiba's sister arrives and with Naruto, attempts to restrain a now giant-sized and hostile Akamaru to administer a potential cure developed by Konoha's medical team. However, the cure only has a 50% chance of working. Kiba succeeds in the task, but almost dies in the process. It is later revealed that Akamaru tried his hardest to miss Kiba's vital points, something that Kiba thanks Akamaru.
185	6	"A Legend from the Hidden Leaf: The Onbaa!"; Transliteration: "Konohagakure no Densetsu - Onbaa wa Jitsuzai Shita!!" (Japanese: 木ノ葉隠れの伝説 オンバアは実在した!!)	Directed by : Atsushi Nigorikawa; Storyboarded by : Seiji Okuda	Yasuyuki Suzuki	Sang Yeob Kim	May 17, 2006	August 2, 2008
A legendary creature, the Onbaa, is the central focus of this episode, attaching to Naruto's back and causing havoc wherever Naruto goes. Despite Naruto's efforts, it remains firmly attached to Naruto's back. Tsunade mentions that Jiraiya once fought the Onbaa, although Tsunade paid him no heed at the time, believing him to be a fool. The Onbaa continues to increase in size, eventually becoming larger than Naruto himself. However, during a mission, it aids Naruto, causing Naruto to reconsider their relationship, but the Onbaa's mother appears, driving Naruto off and claiming her offspring. The child manages to calm the mother and Naruto is worn off and sleeps. After a while, Naruto awakes and feels something furry where he is lying, getting the feeling to be piggybacked. Naruto wakes up at the front of Konoha and looks behind him, seeing Ombu leaving with his mother and eventually saying goodbye. When Naruto returns to Tsunade, he laughs out loud. She asks how to get the Onbaa off from their backs. Naruto teases by saying he wrestled with them just like Jiraiya did. She still does not believe him since the Onbaa has been proven to not be a legend. Everyone is found to have an Onbaa on their backs and Naruto leaves laughing.
186	7	"Laughing Shino"; Transliteration: "Warau Shino" (Japanese: 笑うシノ)	Directed by : Masaaki Kumagai; Storyboarded by : Shinji Satō	Satoru Nishizono	Hiromi Okazaki	May 24, 2006	August 9, 2008
A man named Moshino Kagetsu Fuuta stands to lose all his inheritance if he laughs during his father's funeral. Knowing that all his relatives will try to make him laugh in order to keep the inheritance to themselves, he hires Konoha ninjas to attend the funeral in his place. The village chooses to send the ever-serious Shino Aburame, with Naruto backing him up. However, before the funeral begins, Shino is poisoned by a drug that causes him to laugh uncontrollably. Naruto attends the funeral, and learns that the man's father, who is actually alive, planned it to teach his family to value happiness and humor over money. Naruto realizes that Shino had told jokes while disguised as the man's father, but Shino demands that he keep that a secret.
Peddlers Escort
187	8	"Open for Business! The Leaf Moving Service"; Transliteration: "Kaigyō!! Konoha Hikkoshi Sentā" (Japanese: 開業!! 木ノ葉引越センター)	Directed by : Kiyomu Fukuda; Storyboarded by : Shigenori Kageyama	Shin Yoshida	Ik Hyun Eum	May 31, 2006	August 9, 2008
Naruto, Choji and Hinata are sent to help some peddlers move out of the Land of Greens. Unbeknownst to them, a group called the Three Criminal Brothers, have taken control of the land and are looking for one of the peddlers.
188	9	"The Mystery of the Targeted Merchants"; Transliteration: "Fukakai - Nerawa-reta Gyōshōnin" (Japanese: 不可解 狙われた行商人)	Yūki Kinoshita	Shin Yoshida	Yasuhiko Kanezuka	June 7, 2006	August 16, 2008
After an attack by Ruiga of the Three Criminal Brothers results in the death of Kikujou, and Naruto notices that their attackers are looking for a specific person, Naruto's group realizes that they have not been told the truth about the peddlers. They learn that the peddlers were being used as cover for the Land of Green's princess Haruna in order to escape from the Three Criminal Brothers. It is then revealed that she does not trust others and is willing to sacrifice other people to protect herself, believing that it does not matter who dies as long as she, the only one who can rebuild her country, survives.
189	10	"A Limitless Supply of Ninja Tools"; Transliteration: "Chikasui - Mujinzō no Ningu" (Japanese: 地下水 無尽蔵の忍具)	Directed by : Hiroshi Kimura; Storyboarded by : Takafumi Hayashi	Shin Yoshida	Minoru Morita	June 14, 2006	August 16, 2008
Naruto and Yurinojou do battle with Ruiga, and with Choji's help, are able to defeat him by destroying his "dowsing" tonfas, which allows him to search for places where there are great amounts of water, and leading him to a dry area to put him at a disadvantage. Ruiga survives the battle, but the second brother, Jiga, kills him for a greater share of the country's wealth. Meanwhile, after Haruna's reasons for distrust are revealed to be the result of her father having allowed her to be kept hostage as a child, Haruna knocks Hinata unconscious to escape alone. Naruto pursues the princess, but encounters Jiga, who can manipulate magnetism.
190	11	"The Byakugan Sees the Blind Spot!"; Transliteration: "Byakugan wa Mita! Jiki Tsukai no Shikaku" (Japanese: 白眼は見た！磁気使いの死角)	Directed by : Yuki Hayashi; Storyboarded by : Toshiya Niidome	Shin Yoshida	Zenjirō Ukulele	June 21, 2006	August 23, 2008
As Naruto is faring poorly in the battle with Jiga, Hinata arrives. Although Hinata initially cannot damage him, she realizes that his magnetism is his potential weakness. She uses her Byakugan to interfere with his chakra, rendering Jiga unable to turn off his magnetism and buries himself alive in a vortex of iron sand. Naruto saves Hinata from the vortex and as she and Yurinojou are too badly injured to fight, goes to find the princess on his own. Hinata, Choji and Yurinojou are kidnapped by the third brother along with several ninjas. The last criminal brother Renga, who manipulates the water vapor in the air to the extent that he can control sunlight, encounters Naruto and Haruna.
191	12	"Forecast: Death! Cloudy with Chance of Sun!"; Transliteration: "Shi no Senkoku "Kumori Tokidoki Hare"" (Japanese: 死の宣告｢くもり時々晴れ｣)	Directed by : Atsushi Nigorikawa; Storyboarded by : Seiji Okuda	Shin Yoshida	Sang Yeob Kim	June 28, 2006	August 23, 2008
Naruto learns that his companions have been kidnapped by Renga's men and will only be released if he turns over Haruna. During this confrontation, it is revealed that the princess' father, shortly before his death, had confessed his regret of turning over the princess for the sake of his people and wished for the good of the people regardless of what happens to him. Haruna, having been influenced by Naruto and this revelation, offers to sacrifice herself to protect Naruto. Naruto defeats Renga by reflecting sunlight off his forehead protector and learns that Shizune, Shikamaru and several Konoha ninjas have rescued Hinata, Choji and Yurinojou, Haruna surpasses her father and becomes the ruler for the Land of Greens while Naruto and his companions return home.
Standalone side stories
192	13	"Ino Screams! Chubby Paradise!"; Transliteration: "Ino Zekkyō! Pocchari ♥ Paradaisu" (Japanese: いの絶叫！ポッチャリ♥パラダイス)	Directed by : Kiyomu Fukuda; Storyboarded by : Shigenori Kageyama	Yuka Miyata	Ik Hyun Eum	July 5, 2006	August 30, 2008
Princess Fuku is meeting her fiance for the very first time. She is hesitant to appear to him in person, thinking that she looks unattractive because she is overweight as a result of binging on snacks to relieve stress. She hires Ino Yamanaka - who looks exactly like the princess except for the one obvious difference - to take her place and win her fiance's (who bears a strong resemblance to Elvis Presley) heart. Ino tries to behave like a princess worthy of the man's admiration, but she finds his flamboyant displays of affection unbearable. Naruto, frustrated by the mission's slow progress, takes matters into his own hands by transforming into the princess himself. His interference upsets Ino and the real princess, and accidentally reveals the real one. It is revealed that the prince likes chubby women and Ino cannot comprehend why.
193	14	"Viva Dojo Challenge! Youth Is All About Passion!"; Transliteration: "Biba Dōjōyaburi! Seishun wa Bakuhatsuda" (Japanese: ビバ道場破り！青春はバクハツだ)	Directed by : Hayato Goda; Storyboarded by : Toshiya Niidome	Satoru Nishizono	Hidehiko Okano & Takenori Tsukuma	July 12, 2006	August 30, 2008
Rock Lee is hungry for a sparring match, but has no one to spar with. He builds his own dojo in the hopes of attracting challengers. Might Guy is so inspired by Lee's motivation that he puts on a disguise so that he can serve as the challenger that Lee seeks. But before he gets to challenge Lee, Guy is sidetracked by a mission. An intruder then shows up to spy on the village by impersonating Guy, but he unintentionally gets caught in Lee's overzealous training match. Naruto takes over for him, and fights evenly with Lee, and the intruder takes on Lee's form, but runs into the real Guy, who has come to take the challenge, and is easily defeated. Guy, hearing of the intruder's identity, drops him off in Tsunade's office, angering her.
194	15	"The Mysterious Curse of the Haunted Castle"; Transliteration: "Kaiki - Norowa-reta Yūrei-jō" (Japanese: 怪奇 呪われた幽霊城)	Directed by : Akira Shimizu; Storyboarded by : Kei Jūmonji	Yasuyuki Suzuki	Yasuhiko Kanezuka	July 19, 2006	September 6, 2008
Naruto, Kiba and Hinata enter a castle in search of the Daimyo's wife. They discover that inside there is a monster that was summoned by the castle's original occupants, and learn that the creature is seeking release from the world. Naruto destroys the contract that summoned the monster and it returns home, releasing all of its captives (including the Daimyo's wife).
Third Super-Beast
195	16	"The Third Super-Beast!"; Transliteration: "Daisan no Chōjū - Saidai no Raibaru" (Japanese: 第三の超獣 最大のライバル)	Directed by : Hiroshi Kimura; Storyboarded by : Shinji Satō	Junki Takegami	Minoru Morita	July 26, 2006	September 6, 2008
Tsunade, fearing that Rock Lee will overexert himself and once again end his career as a ninja, warns him not to accept missions or train too hard. At the same time, a student arrives in town and defeats Lee at taijutsu, dodging all his moves and using one that nearly breaks his ankle. The student goes out with Might Guy on a mission while Lee recovers, causing Lee to believe that Guy has abandoned him. It is then revealed that the student is an impostor, and he lures Guy into a trap as Naruto, Neji and Tenten arrive to support him.
196	17	"Hot-Blooded Confrontation: Student vs. Sensei"; Transliteration: "Namida no Gekitotsu! Nekketsu Shitei Taiketsu" (Japanese: 涙の激突！熱血師弟対決)	Masaaki Kumagai	Junki Takegami	Hiromi Okazaki	August 9, 2006	September 13, 2008
Guy is trapped inside a pagoda made out of kung fu training dummies while Naruto, Neji, Tenten and a recently arrived Lee fight off the dummies outside. It is revealed that the impostor student and his two brothers want revenge for Guy defeating their father and badly wounding him, causing him to be unable to train or take missions and eventually die. Lee enters and is trapped in a technique that causes him and Guy to mistake the other for a hostile training dummy. The two see through the technique and simultaneously use the Hidden Lotus to destroy the dummies without harming each other, wrecking the pagoda. Guy tells the brothers that their father respected him and wanted them to fight Guy, not for revenge, but to learn from him, and that he wanted them to fight him fairly, allowing them to understand their father's dying wish.
Recapture Plans of Leaf
197	18	"Crisis: The Hidden Leaf 11 Gather!"; Transliteration: "Daipinchi! Konoha no Jūichi-nin Zen'in Shūgō" (Japanese: 大ピンチ！木ノ葉の11(じゅういち)人全員集合)	Directed by : Atsushi Nigorikawa; Storyboarded by : Seiji Okuda	Satoru Nishizono	Dae Hoon Kim	August 16, 2006	September 13, 2008
Naruto has lunch with an old man named Gennou, who came to Konoha as a carpenter to help rebuild the village. However, during the night, the carpenter escapes with some documents, and seemingly blows himself up in a suicide bombing, warning that Konoha will soon be destroyed. The ten Leaf Genin and Shikamaru are told to find out more about the man's activities, but ANBU brings Naruto in for questioning, saying that Gennou was the one who stole the plans and escaped.
198	19	"The Anbu Gives Up? Naruto's Recollection"; Transliteration: "Anbu Mō Teage - Naruto no Kioku" (Japanese: 暗部もお手上げ ナルトの記憶)	Directed by : Yūki Kinoshita; Storyboarded by : Toshiya Niidome	Satoru Nishizono	Zenjirō Ukulele	August 23, 2006	September 20, 2008
The ANBU agents use reverse hypnosis on Naruto, but realize that he remembers nothing of importance. Some of the group researches Gennou, but finds little except for him being a mediocre carpenter who did little out of the ordinary. However, it is revealed that his letter of introduction was forged, and investigation of the scene of his suicide bombing and the corpse in the hospital suggests that Gennou staged his death.
199	20	"The Missed Target"; Transliteration: "Matohazure - Mietekita Hyōteki" (Japanese: 的外れ 見えてきた標的)	Directed by : Kiyomu Fukuda; Storyboarded by : Shigenori Kageyama	Satoru Nishizono	Ik Hyun Eum	August 30, 2006	September 20, 2008
A bird drops nearly all the stolen blueprints all over the village, serving as a diversion from Gennou's true plan. The group discovers that a kunai target in the academy dojo is actually the trigger for explosive tags in the academy, and that explosive tags are planted all across the village.
200	21	"The Powerful Helper"; Transliteration: "Gen'eki Baribari! Saikyō no Suketto" (Japanese: 現役バリバリ！最強の助っ人)	Directed by : Hayato Goda; Storyboarded by : Kei Jūmonji	Satoru Nishizono	Kumiko Horikoshi & Takenori Tsukuma	September 13, 2006	October 4, 2008
The group sets out to disarm the traps unbeknownst to Gennou. The research then concludes that Gennou set the traps thirty years ago, as part of a mission for the Hidden Heat Devil Village, which was destroyed by another village shortly after he completed the mission, leading to his son's death. Naruto comes to terms with the fact that the old man he befriended attempted to destroy the village, and finds a lead that Gennou is in the mountains behind the village.
201	22	"Multiple Traps! Countdown to Destruction"; Transliteration: "Tajū Torappu - Hōkai no Kauntodaun" (Japanese: 多重トラップ 崩壊のカウントダウン)	Directed by : Mitsutaka Noshitani; Storyboarded by : Toshiya Niidome	Satoru Nishizono	Shinichi Suzuki	September 20, 2006	October 18, 2008
Naruto pursues Gennou to the mountains at the back of town, and hears that he plans to detonate explosive tags there, burying the Hidden Leaf Village in a massive rockslide. Before he can do so, Naruto's friends arrive, Hinata having informed them where he was going. They combine their efforts to prevent him from detonating tags, and manage to save the village. Gennou passes after saying that he wanted his son to enjoy another scavenger hunt, and the group realizes that while he had initially intended to destroy the village, because Naruto reminded him of his son, he made his traps into a scavenger hunt. Hence, the Hidden Leaf Village was actually safe.
Battles recap special
202	23	"The Top 5 Ninja Battles!"; Transliteration: "Honjitsu Happyō! Ninja-tachi no Ase to Namida no Meishōbu Besuto Faibu! Otanoshimi no Bangai-hen Moaruttebayo Supesharu" (Japanese: 本日発表！忍者たちの汗と涙の名勝負ベスト5(ファイブ)！お楽しみの番外編もあるってばよスペシャル)	Hayato Date	Yuka Miyata	Seiko Asai	September 27, 2006	November 1, 2008
Naruto and Sakura Haruno host a special recap episode. The episode features highlights of five battles from the Sasuke Retrieval Arc: the battle between Naruto and Sasuke Uchiha on the hospital roof, the battle between Choji and Jirobo, the battle between Neji and Kidomaru, the battle between Kiba and Sakon and the final battle between Naruto and Sasuke in the Valley of the End. There are also interviews with Choji, Kiba, and Neji, who all beat up Naruto for making fun of them and saying things like "Choji's fight made him sweat." At the end of the show, Jiraiya announces Orochimaru as a surprise guest, who gives Sakura and Naruto an opportunity to briefly see Sasuke.
Yakumo Rescue
203	24	"Kurenai's Decision: Team 8 Left Behind"; Transliteration: "Kurenai no Ketsudan - Torinokosa-reta Daihappan" (Japanese: 紅の決断 とり残された第八班)	Directed by : Akira Shimizu; Storyboarded by : Kei Jūmonji	Junki Takegami	Yasuhiko Kanezuka	October 5, 2006	November 15, 2008
Naruto encounters a girl named Yakumo, who, by drawing a picture of Konoha, causes lightning to strike Tsunade's mansion. Shortly thereafter, Kurenai Yuhi resigns as leader of Team 8, and Naruto is determined to find out why. That night, Naruto sneaks into Yakumo's mansion disguised as Kurenai, and discovers a room full of Yakumo's paintings. Naruto escapes after one of the paintings nearly kills him, and is confronted by security, who tranquilize him.
204	25	"Yakumo's Sealed Power"; Transliteration: "Nerawa-reta Yakumo - Fūinsa-reta Nōryoku" (Japanese: 狙われた八雲 封印された能力)	Directed by : Hiroshi Kimura; Storyboarded by : Tetsuji Takayanagi	Junki Takegami	Minoru Morita	October 5, 2006	November 22, 2008
After getting tranquilized, Naruto has a dream of Kurenai threatening to seal Yakumo's genjutsu abilities. He discovers that this is the reason why she left the team, but Kurenai refuses to disclose any more. As Kurenai goes to see Yakumo, several Kurama Clan members attack.
205	26	"Kurenai's Top Secret Mission: The Promise with the Third Hokage"; Transliteration: "Kurenai no Gokuhi Ninmu: Sandaime to no Yakusoku" (Japanese: 紅の極秘任務～三代目との約束～)	Directed by : Masaaki Kumagai; Storyboarded by : Chiyuki Tanaka	Junki Takegami	Hiromi Okazaki	October 5, 2006	December 27, 2008
As Kurenai attempts to escape with Yakumo; Naruto, Sakura, the members of Team 8 and Might Guy come to their assistance, and defeat the enemy. Kurenai and Yakumo reveal that Yakumo was entrusted to Kurenai as her student, as while she cannot fight, she was a talented genjutsu user. However, Kurenai sealed away her abilities, and Yakumo reveals that she did so under the order of the Third Hokage.
206	27	"Genjutsu or Reality?"; Transliteration: "Genjutsu ka Genjitsu ka - Gokan o Seisuru Mono" (Japanese: 幻術か現実か 五感を制するもの)	Directed by : Atsushi Nigorikawa; Storyboarded by : Seiji Okuda	Junki Takegami	Dae Hoon Kim	October 19, 2006	January 3, 2009
Naruto, Kurenai, Yakumo and Team 8 return to Konoha, which appears to have been destroyed in their absence. They learn from the head of the Kurama clan that they are trapped in a genjutsu that has enveloped the entire town, and Naruto and Team 8 manages to escape. They enter the mansion to find Kurenai and Yakumo.
207	28	"The Supposed Sealed Ability"; Transliteration: "Fūji-rareta Hazu no Nōryoku" (Japanese: 封じられたはずの能力)	Directed by : Yūki Kinoshita; Storyboarded by : Toshiya Niidome	Junki Takegami	Zenjirō Ukulele	October 26, 2006	January 10, 2009
Naruto and the members of Team 8 head into Yakumo's house to find her with Kurenai, threatening to erase her former sensei from existence. It is revealed that the malicious entity known as Idou dwelled within Yakumo's subconscious, and was the reason why her abilities were sealed away. Yakumo ultimately overcomes Idou and realizes that Kurenai cared about her. Kurenai then returns to an overjoyed Team 8.
Standalone side story
208	29	"The Weight of the Prized Artifact!"; Transliteration: "Meiki - Kachōfūgetsu no Omosa" (Japanese: 名器 花鳥風月の重さ)	Directed by : Kiyomu Fukuda; Storyboarded by : Shigenori Kageyama	Kou Hei Mushi	Ik Hyun Eum	November 2, 2006	January 24, 2009
Naruto and Kiba are ordered to escort a man named Shinemon, who has a rare and valuable artifact. Shinemon makes the mission almost insufferable with his pompous, overbearing attitude and his willingness to put the two in danger just to protect his own interests. Bandits steal the artifact, and when Naruto saves Shinemon after he puts himself at risk and save the Kacho Fugetsu, he teaches him that people are more valuable than possessions. It is also revealed that Shinemon is the creator of the Kacho Fugetsu and can easily make another.
Gantetsu Escort
209	30	"The Enemy: Ninja Dropouts"; Transliteration: "Teki wa "Shinobazu"" (Japanese: 敵は｢不忍｣)	Directed by : Hayato Goda; Storyboarded by : Kei Jūmonji	Yasuyuki Suzuki	Takenori Tsukuma & Kumiko Horikoshi	November 9, 2006	January 31, 2009
Naruto, Sakura and Lee are hired to escort a "Ninja Dropout"- a criminal ninja- named Gantetsu to prison, and guard him against his comrades, who may be trying to free him. They learn that Todoroki, the captain of the guard, has a personal vendetta against Gantetsu for what happened to his parents and younger brother. During an attack by one of the Ninja Dropouts, Naruto, Todoroki, and Gantetsu are separated from Sakura and Lee.
210	31	"The Bewildering Forest"; Transliteration: "Mayoi no Mori" (Japanese: 迷いの森)	Directed by : Mitsutaka Noshitani; Storyboarded by : Mamoru Sasaki	Yasuyuki Suzuki	Shinichi Suzuki	November 16, 2006	October 25, 2009 (Note: English air dates for Naruto episodes 210–220 refer to its first television broadcast on YTV's Bionix programming block in Canada. Cartoon Network cancelled its run of the series after episode 209 and the final eleven episodes of Naruto remain unaired on U.S. television.)
The boat that Naruto's group is on washes over a waterfall, allowing Naruto, Gantetsu and Todoroki to escape into the forest. Naruto learns from Gantetsu that the forest is the Ninja Dropout hideout, and that only a Ninja Dropout like him can find the way through. Naruto's group defeats one of the Ninja Dropout members, who attacks with a large claw-like machine. Sakura and Lee encounter some orphans who are taking refuge in the forest. It is then revealed that Todoroki intends to kill Gantetsu and avenge his family.
211	32	"Memory of Flames"; Transliteration: "Honō no Kioku" (Japanese: 炎の記憶)	Directed by : Akira Shimizu; Storyboarded by : Kei Jūmonji	Yasuyuki Suzuki	Yasuhiko Kanezuka	November 30, 2006	October 25, 2009
Todoroki states that he would go as far as killing Naruto to get to Gantetsu. When another member of the Ninja Dropouts attacks Naruto and Todoroki, capturing Gantetsu, it is revealed that the other members want to capture Gantetsu to retrieve the money he stole with them. Naruto's group learns that Akio, Todoroki's brother, is alive, and he and his other orphans have been cared for by Gantetsu, who is seeking to atone for his crimes. The group fights and defeats another Ninja Dropout member, but Akio is kidnapped and taken to the Ninja Dropout base.
212	33	"To Each His Own Path"; Transliteration: "Sorezore no Michi" (Japanese: それぞれの道)	Directed by : Hiroshi Kimura; Storyboarded by : Tetsuji Takayanagi	Yasuyuki Suzuki	Minoru Morita	December 7, 2006	November 8, 2009
Naruto, Todoroki, and Gantetsu enter the Ninja Dropout mansion, leaving Sakura to care for the children and Lee to fight off the Ninja Dropout members outside. While Gantetsu and Todoroki go to rescue Akio, Naruto fights the Ninja Dropout leader and defeats him. The mansion catches fire in the fight, and Gantetsu saves Akio before escaping with him and Todoroki. Todoroki cannot forgive Gantetsu, but at the end allows him to stay with the children by falsely reporting that he had died in the fire.
Menma Memory Search
213	34	"Vanished Memories"; Transliteration: "Ushinawa-reta Kioku" (Japanese: 失われた記憶)	Directed by : Masaaki Kumagai; Storyboarded by : Kei Jūmonji	Shin Yoshida	Hidehiko Okano & Gorou Sessha	December 14, 2006	November 8, 2009
While collecting bamboo shoots for menma ramen, Naruto finds a man near the river bank. The man is unable to remember his name, so Naruto calls him "Menma". As Naruto tries to help him recover his memories, he learns that Menma is extraordinarily good natured and helpful. When a mysterious man attacks the two, Menma uses an ocarina to increase Naruto's abilities, causing Naruto to wonder who he really is.
214	35	"Bringing Back Reality"; Transliteration: "Torimodoshita Genjitsu" (Japanese: 取り戻した現実)	Atsushi Nigorikawa	Shin Yoshida	Dae Hoon Kim	December 21, 2006	November 15, 2009
Naruto and Menma are sent on a mission with Neji and Tenten. Tsunade begins suspecting that Menma was a Sound ninja due to his abilities, and Neji begins suspecting the same thing when Menma moves even faster than he does. The group investigates the town destroyed by bandits, and Menma convinces Naruto's group to help build it to defend against another attack.
215	36	"A Past to Be Erased"; Transliteration: "Keshi Saritai Kako" (Japanese: 消し去りたい過去)	Directed by : Yūki Kinoshita; Storyboarded by : Toshiya Niidome	Shin Yoshida	Zenjirō Ukulele	December 21, 2006	November 15, 2009
When Menma is injured by one of the bandits, it is revealed that he was once one of them, and that he was at the town during the attack. Despite this, Menma is willing to risk himself to help fight off the bandits, and tells Naruto of the leader's master plan to flood the town with a dam. After revealing that he lost his memory only for a very short time, Menma sacrifices himself to cause a rockslide and save the town and Naruto defeats the bandit leader. Despite Memma's death, Naruto thanks him.
Support of Sand
216	37	"The Targeted Shukaku"; Transliteration: "Kieta Takumi - Nerawa-reta Shukaku" (Japanese: 消えた匠 狙われた守鶴)	Directed by : Kiyomu Fukuda; Storyboarded by : Shigenori Kageyama	Junki Takegami	Ik Hyun Eum	January 11, 2007	November 22, 2009
A group of rogue ninjas from the Takumi Village - called Shitenshonin (Four Celestials in the English dub) - invade the Hidden Sand Village and kidnap Matsuri, a Ninja Academy student under Gaara. They seek Garra's Shukaku to revive the village's forbidden weapon. The Sand Siblings pursue the enemy without other Sand Ninjas supporting them. Meanwhile, Shikamaru assembles the rest of the group (except Tenten), and splits up into two-man teams - Shikamaru and Ino, Naruto and Lee, and Kiba and Choji. Each 2-man cell will assist one of the Sand Ninjas. Neji and Hinata are avoiding combat, and scout ahead, while Sakura and Shino act as medical support, and command and control (using Shino's bugs to pass along information).
217	38	"Sand Alliance with the Leaf Shinobi"; Transliteration: "Suna no Dōmeikoku - Konoha no Shinobi" (Japanese: 砂の同盟国 木ノ葉の忍)	Directed by : Hayato Goda; Storyboarded by : Kei Jūmonji	Yasuyuki Suzuki	Kumiko Horikoshi & Takenori Tsukuma	January 18, 2007	November 22, 2009
The rogue ninjas continue running, as Gaara, Temari and Kankuro chase. At the same time, Shino, Hinata, and Neji are using their abilities to find the location of the Shitenshounnin. Temari encounters the first of the members (a woman that uses swords to produce wind), and leaves Gaara and Kankuro to chase after the other three members. Shortly after, Kankuro encounters another ninja that uses a 3-bladed sword that can separate yet still be connected by a wire. Gaara leaves to chase that other two members. Gaara finds himself a battle with a huge, robust man who has a spiked flail. The Shitenshonin prepare to kill Temari and Kankuro, but Shikamaru saves Temari with his Shadow Imitation Technique, and Kiba saves Kankuro.
218	39	"Sealed Sand: The Counterattack!"; Transliteration: "Fūji-rareta Suna - Suiko no Hangeki" (Japanese: 封じられた砂 水虎の反撃)	Directed by : Yukio Okazaki; Storyboarded by : Toshiya Niidome	Yasuyuki Suzuki	Shinichi Suzuki	January 25, 2007	November 29, 2009
The members of Shitenshonin create a triangular formation, using the waterways to stop Gaara from using his sand powers. Meanwhile, Shikamaru and Kiba are having trouble backing up Temari and Kankuro. Before the third member of the rogue ninjas can kill Gaara, Lee and Naruto arrive to save him. At this point, Sakura's task is to head around aiding those with injuries. Shikamaru and Temari use a combination to wipe out their enemy, and Akamaru pulls the pieces of Kankurou's broken puppet together to kill the second enemy. Gaara uses a spear to take out the third member and pursues the leader in hopes of saving Matsuri.
219	40	"The Ultimate Weapon Reborn"; Transliteration: "Yomigaetta Kyūkyoku Heiki" (Japanese: よみがえった究極兵器)	Directed by : Akira Shimizu; Storyboarded by : Kei Jūmonji	Junki Takegami	Gorou Sessha & Hidehiko Okano	February 1, 2007	November 29, 2009
Although his comrades are defeated, Hoki puts his final plan in motion by using Gaara to revive Seimei. To do this, he traps Gaara in the chakra absorbing metal dome. Gaara partially transforms into the One-Tailed Raccoon, which is what Hoki wanted all along. Hoki performs a ritual and sacrifices his own body for Seimei, which allows him to be reincarnated. Seimei takes up the weapons of the Shitenshonin, therefore becoming the "Ultimate Weapon" of Takumi Village. Hoki overwhelms Naruto, but Gaara breaks free, partially transformed into Shukaku.
220	41	"The Departure"; Transliteration: "Tabidachi" (Japanese: 旅立ち)	Directed by : Hiroshi Kimura; Storyboarded by : Tetsuji Takayanagi	Junki Takegami	Minoru Morita	February 8, 2007	December 6, 2009
After Gaara kills Seimei, all ninjas return home to the Leaf Village and continue training. Ino makes a request to become Tsunade's student and Tenten realizes that she was left out of the mission. Naruto and Jiraiya leave the village for two and half years of training.

== Home media release ==
=== English ===
==== DVD ====
Naruto Uncut (USA)
Volume	Date	Discs	Episodes	Reference
14	May 26, 2009	3	178–191	
15	July 21, 2009	3	192–205	
16	September 22, 2009	3	206–220	

Naruto Season Box Set (USA)
Box Set	Date	Discs	Episodes	Reference
Season 4, Vol. 1	October 26, 2010	6	164–191	
Season 4, Vol. 2	December 14, 2010	6	192–220	

Naruto Unleashed (UK)
Volume	Date	Box Set Release	Disc	Episodes	Reference
Series 7 Part 2	October 26, 2009	3	170–182		
Series 8 Part 1	December 14, 2009	June 14, 2010	3	183–195	
Series 8 Part 2	February 1, 2010	June 14, 2010	3	196–208	
Series 9	April 19, 2010		3	209–220	

Naruto Uncut (AUS / NZ)
Collection	Episodes	DVD release date	Reference
14	178–191	October 21, 2009	
15	192–205	December 16, 2009	
16	206–220	February 17, 2010	

Naruto Origins (AUS / NZ)
Collection	Episodes	DVD release date	Reference
4	164–220		

==== Blu-ray ====
Viz Media (Region 1/A)
Set	Date	Discs	Episodes	References
7	June 14, 2022	4	166–192	
8	October 18, 2022	4	193–220	
