= Naruto season 4 =

Naruto
- Season 4
- First Japanese home media volume cover of the season
- No. of episodes: 48

Release
- Original network: TV Tokyo
- Original release: April 27, 2005 – April 5, 2006

Season chronology
- ← Previous; Season 3 Next → Season 5

The fourth and penultimate season of the Naruto anime television series, labelled as the "4th Stage" in the Japanese DVD release, is directed by Hayato Date, and produced by Studio Pierrot and TV Tokyo. Based on Masashi Kishimoto's manga series of the same name, the season follows Naruto Uzumaki and his fellow ninjas being assigned to other missions after the failed mission to prevent Sasuke Uchiha from joining up with Orochimaru. The season ran on TV Tokyo and its affiliates from April 27, 2005, to April 5, 2006.

The English dub was shown on both Cartoon Network's Toonami and YTV's Bionix programming blocks from January 19 to June 28, 2008.

Sony Pictures Entertainment collected the episodes in a total of twelve DVD volumes, each containing four episodes, between January 1 and December 6, 2006. Only the first three episodes were released by Viz Media in DVD volumes, leaving to DVD boxes that collected the entire series.

Nine pieces of theme music are used in the episodes; four opening themes and five ending themes. The opening themes are "Seishun Kyōsōkyoku" (青春狂騒曲; lit. Youth's Rhapsody) by Sambomaster (used for episodes 131 to 135), "No Boy No Cry" (ノーボーイ·ノークライ, Nō Bōi Nō Kurai) by Stance Punks (used for episodes 136 to 157), "Namikaze Satellite" (波風サテライト, Namikaze Sateraito; lit. 'Discord Satellite') by Snowkel (used for episodes 158 to 177), and "Re:member" by Flow (used for episodes 178 and 179). The ending themes are "Nakushita Kotoba" (失くした言葉; lit. Lost Words) by No Regret Life (used for episodes 132 to 141), "Speed" by Analog Fish (used for episodes 142 to 153), "Soba ni Iru Kara" (そばにいるから; lit. 'I'm Always by Your Side') by Amadori (used for episodes 154 to 165), "Parade" (パレード, Parēdo) by Chaba (used for episodes 166 to 177), and "Yellow Moon" by Akeboshi (used for episodes 178 and 179). The English version replaces the ending themes with an instrumental version of "Rise" by Jeremy Sweet and Ian Nickus.

== Episodes ==
No. overall	No. in season	Title	Directed by	Written by	Animation directed by	Original release date	English air date
Sasuke Retrieval
132	1	"For a Friend..."; Transliteration: "Tomo yo!" (Japanese: 親友(とも)よ！)	Shinji Satō	Katsuyuki Sumisawa	Yukiko Ban	April 27, 2005	January 19, 2008
While Naruto Uzumaki battles Sasuke Uchiha, Kakashi Hatake leaves the village to follow them after learning from Tsunade and Sakura Haruno about Sasuke's absence. Meanwhile, believing Naruto to be his closest friend, Sasuke prepares to kill him in hopes that his death will be an acceptable price for his Sharingan to evolve into a Mangekyo Sharingan. Naruto's Rasengan and Sasuke's Chidori clash, though neither is capable of overpowering the other. Activating the First State of his Cursed Seal of Heaven in order to gain an advantage, Sasuke mercilessly beats Naruto and later his Chidori hits Naruto's shoulder. While Sasuke thinks the battle is to be won, the Nine-Tails's chakra begins to envelop Naruto as his wounds are healed. He resolves to stop Sasuke and send him home.
133	2	"A Plea from a Friend"; Transliteration: "Namida no Hōkō! Omae wa Ore no Tomodachi da" (Japanese: 涙の咆哮！オマエはオレの友達だ)	Atsushi Wakabayashi	Katsuyuki Sumisawa	Atsushi Wakabayashi	May 4, 2005	January 19, 2008
Nine-Tails's chakra used by Naruto overwhelms Sasuke as he yells at Naruto about not knowing how it feels to lose a family. Naruto, having known the pain of not having a family, explains that he considers Sasuke as a sworn brother. Sasuke puts on his headband while proclaiming that Naruto will not hit it as he manages to fully develop his Sharingan and is now able to read Naruto's quick movements and counterattacks, even when using Multi Shadow Clones Jutsu. Sasuke manages to inflict numerous devastating and bone-crushing attacks on Naruto with Dragon Flame Jutsu. It is not until Sasuke sends Naruto back from the sky to the ground. Needing more strength to fight, Naruto calls upon even more of the Nine-Tails's chakra as it Nine-Tails's cloak covers his body. Due to the movement of the One-Tailed Fox form, Sasuke's Sharingan cannot read Naruto's movements. This shroud also acts as a shield, and Sasuke's attacks are quickly dispersed before reaching Naruto; the tangible chakra also acts as a potent weapon, negating the Sharingan's prediction abilities and allowing Naruto to attack from afar by extending the chakra into a claw-like attack. As the One-Tailed Fox form continues its ravaging onslaught, Sasuke is put on the defensive, forcing him to advance his Cursed Seal powers to Second State to compensate.
134	3	"The End of Tears"; Transliteration: "Namida Ame no Ketsumatsu" (Japanese: 涙雨の結末)	Directed by : Yasuyuki Honda; Storyboarded by : Shinji Satō	Katsuyuki Sumisawa	Kenichiro Ogata	May 11, 2005	January 26, 2008
After activating Second State of his Cursed Seal, Sasuke transforms into a winged equal to Naruto in power. Both remembering their time as teammates, Sasuke enlightens Naruto that they are in the "Valley of the End" and mentions the irony of it as a fitting place to settle things between them once and for all. With Naruto and Sasuke at their peaks of power, the two prepare their final attacks: Nine-Tails's chakra infused Naruto's Rasengan into Vermilion Rasengan and Cursed Seal of Heaven enhanceds Sasuke's Chidori into a Dark Chidori, the rivals collide and form a dome around the two before Sasuke stabs Naruto through the chest. With the last of his strength, Naruto leaves a deep scratch on Sasuke's headband. The dome disappears and Sasuke stands over Naruto in victory. However, refusing to follow the same path as his brother Itachi Uchiha (killing the wielder will unlock the Mangekyo Sharingan) and remembering what Naruto means to him, Sasuke spares Naruto and goes to the Hidden Sound Village. Kakashi arrives too late at the Valley of the End where Naruto and Sasuke fought each other and escorts Naruto back to Konoha, while unaware that a mysterious member of the Akatsuki had watched there unfold from the underground.
135	4	"The Promise That Could Not Be Kept"; Transliteration: "Mamorenakatta Yakusoku" (Japanese: 守れなかった約束)	Toshiya Niidome	Katsuyuki Sumisawa	Masaru Hyodo	May 18, 2005	January 26, 2008
Briefly coming to on Kakashi's back as the rest of the Sasuke Retrieval Team is brought back to the Hidden Leaf Village to make a full recovery, Naruto learns that Sasuke escaped. Meanwhile, Sasuke arrives at Orochimaru's lair in the Hidden Sound Village to become his apprentice. Back at the Leaf Village, once fully recovered at the hospital, Naruto talks to Shikamaru Nara about the failed mission. Eavesdropping on them and reluctant to enter until Tsunade arrives to check up on Naruto, Sakura resolves to hide her sadness to cheer her teammate up as he apologizes to her for not keeping his promise to bring Sasuke back. Sakura tells him that they will get Sasuke back together when another chance comes, Jiraiya offers Naruto a chance to leave with him for a three or four years and training to defend himself against both powerful enemies like Orochimaru and the Akatsuki. Naruto declines the offer, saying that he needs to focus on saving Sasuke. Though Jiraiya tries to convince him that Sasuke is beyond the point of return, Naruto does not accept it and vows to become strong enough to get Sasuke back. Though seeing Naruto's foolish intent, Jiraiya finally decides to help him and agrees to train him when he is ready. Elsewhere, all of the Akatsuki members assemble seven years after Orochimaru's retirement to discuss the new turn of events for three years while their leader tells them that their mission is more vital.
Land of Rice Fields Investigation
136	5	"Deep Cover?! A Super S-Ranked Mission!"; Transliteration: "Sennyū Sōsa!? Tsui ni Kitakita Chō Esu-Kyū Ninmu" (Japanese: 潜入捜査!? 遂にきたきた超S(エス)級任務)	Shigenori Kageyama	Junki Takegami	Kwang Seok Yang	May 25, 2005	February 2, 2008
Jiraiya begins to worry about Naruto and Sakura's well-being. He then requests that Tsunade send the two on a S-rank mission with him. He finds Naruto, telling Sakura he is not going to stop her from going after Sasuke, but he is going with her, and tells them about the S-rank mission. They head off to the Land of Rice Fields to find the Hidden Sound Village and hopefully Sasuke as well.
137	6	"A Town of Outlaws, the Shadow of the Fūma Clan"; Transliteration: "Muhōmono no Machi - Fūma Ichizoku no Kage" (Japanese: 無法者の街 ふうま一族の影)	Directed by : Yuki Hayashi; Storyboarded by : Shinji Satō	Junki Takegami	Yasuhiko Kanezuka	June 1, 2005	February 2, 2008
Naruto, Sakura, and Jiraiya end up in a town that is worse than the one out of which they were chased. Jiraiya heads off, while Naruto and Sakura buy food. Along the way, they find the female ninja that attacked them before. Because the ninja is injured, Naruto and Sakura fight some Sound Ninja to save her. They then learn that her name is Sasame, and that she is looking for her cousin Arashi, who went with several members of their clan to join Orochimaru to revive the clan.
138	7	"Pure Betrayal and a Fleeting Plea"; Transliteration: "Kiyoki Uragiri - Hakanaki Negai" (Japanese: 清き裏切り はかなき願い)	Directed by : Masaaki Kumagai; Storyboarded by : Toshiya Niidome	Junki Takegami	Hiromi Okazaki	June 8, 2005	February 9, 2008
When Sasame drugs Naruto, Sakura and Jiraiya, she prepares to let them be given to Orochimaru in order for her to be led to Arashi. But, when she discovers that they were planning to be killed, she begs the ones about to do so to stop. Naruto reveals that he and the others faked being put to sleep, and attack. Kagerou attacks Naruto and Jiraiya with a powerful technique that shortens her life, then escapes with Jigumo and Kamikiri. When the two discover that they were being used by Orochimaru, he kills them.
139	8	"Pure Terror! The House of Orochimaru!"; Transliteration: "Kyōfu! Orochimaru no Yakata" (Japanese: 恐怖！大蛇丸の館)	Masahiko Murata	Junki Takegami	Seiko Asai	June 15, 2005	February 9, 2008
Sasame leads Naruto, Jiraiya, and Sakura to Orochimaru's hideout. They send Sasame back to the village because of the danger level. Jiraiya summons Gamakichi to go in first and investigate. The four come to three tunnels. Jiraiya goes off to the right, Naruto and Sakura down the middle and Gamakichi down the left. Through the tunnels, they find several deadly booby-traps and dangers. Naruto easily falls for the first, but manages to rescue Sakura from the rest. It comes to the point where there is a trap-door in which Naruto saves Sakura from, falling into it himself. He tells her to go on without him. Sakura trusts him and leaves, Naruto ends up in a dark room with many bamboo sticks and struggles to get free. Meanwhile, as Sakura enters a large vacant room she battles Kabuto Yakushi and Orochimaru, who already have the upper hand.
140	9	"Two Heartbeats: Kabuto's Trap"; Transliteration: "Futatsu no Kodō - Kabuto no Wana" (Japanese: 二つの鼓動 カブトの罠)	Directed by : Yasuyuki Honda; Storyboarded by : Yasuaki Kurotsu	Junki Takegami	Kenichiro Ogata	June 22, 2005	February 16, 2008
In the room where Naruto is in, he encounters Gamakichi, who seems to be of no use in his struggle, the room soon floods with water. Sakura attempts to battle Kabuto, telling him that she believes Naruto and herself will save Sasuke together. She soon loses focus when Kabuto begins harassing her with thoughts of Sasuke's inevitable death. He says: "Sasuke is already dead, and you two can meet with him in the afterlife." She begins sobbing and remains still as Kabuto is about to kill her. Naruto arrives in the nick of time to save Sakura, but she is still petrified in tears. Naruto tells her not to believe him, takes her away and a battle ensues. Naruto battles Kabuto viciously using Shadow Clones Jutsu, but Kabuto defeats them with a fire technique. Eventually, Naruto corners and defeats him with the Rasengan, injuring him badly. Although appeared defeated, Kabuto traps him in some chakra threads immune to normal blades that connect their hearts; if Kabuto's heart stops, so will Naruto's. He states that he is willing to sacrifice himself to please Orochimaru. Before Kabuto can crush his own heart, Sasame arrives and gives Sakura a tag to wrap on her kunai. Sakura cuts off Kabuto's threads and frees Naruto. Sasame reveals that the chakra threads are a special technique of the Fuma clan. A dying Kabuto's mask is removed and it is revealed that it was Kagerou all along. Orochimaru arrives and in turn removes his mask to reveal he is in fact Arashi. He transforms into a monster.
141	10	"Sakura's Determination!"; Transliteration: "Sakura no Ketsui" (Japanese: サクラの決意)	Shinji Satō	Junki Takegami	Yukiko Ban	June 29, 2005	February 16, 2008
Naruto takes on Arashi, but gets trapped and beaten easily. Sakura thinks he's dead and Naruto ends up blowing his sneak attack cover to protect her, getting pierced by the spine. Naruto tries his attack again, but his injury causes a problem. Naruto gets trapped in an attack that will crush him if he doesn't get out. Sasame attacks Arashi and manages to set him free for a second. However, it does not last long and he soon tries to kill Sasame. Sakura jumps in the way and says she will give her life to protect her friends. Naruto tells her she can't die and Arashi tries to finish Naruto off. Sasame causes enough of a distraction for Naruto to break free. The attack caused by Naruto frees Arashi, and Arashi protects Sasame from the monster that was part of his body. The Orochimaru's hideout begins to collapse and Jiraiya arrives. Arashi tells Naruto that Sasuke is alive and tells them he cannot leave since he is a puppet, Naruto, Sakura, Jiraiya and Sasame manages to escape from Orochimaru's hideout collapsing, leaving Arashi die in the process. The Fuma Clan promises to rebuild their town and everyone heads back to Konoha. Considering herself to have been of little use, She meets Naruto in the hospital and thanks him, insisting that next time, she would help him to save Sasuke, Sakura visits Tsunade and asks to become her pupil, Tsunade agrees and Sakura begins to learn to be a medical ninja.
Mizuki Tracking
142	11	"The Three Villains from the Maximum Security Prison"; Transliteration: "Genkai Shisetsu no San Akunin" (Japanese: 厳戒施設の三悪人)	Shigenori Kageyama	Kou Hei Mushi	Kwang Seok Yang	July 6, 2005	February 23, 2008
With the events of the Rice Field Country behind them and the end of Sasuke search, everyone prepares for their training. But, a new threat soon arises. Mizuki has escaped from the prison, and he is planning to break out of Konoha's Correctional Facility along with the help of Fujin and Raijin, the Legendary Stupid Brothers (changed to the Famous Idiot Brothers in the dub). However, this time Orochimaru may be pulling the strings. Asuma and Kurenai are sent to interrogate Mizuki, but they run into trouble on the way. Naruto shows up and finds the two jonin injured and defeated.
143	12	"Tonton! I'm Counting on You!"; Transliteration: "Hashire Tonton! Omae no Hana ga Tayori Dattebayo" (Japanese: 走れトントン！お前の鼻が頼りだってばよ)	Directed by : Yuki Hayashi; Storyboarded by : Toshiya Niidome	Kou Hei Mushi	Yasuhiko Kanezuka	July 13, 2005	February 23, 2008
Shizune and her team encounter Mizuki, but all of them are defeated. When Tonton comes back to warn Tsunade, Naruto takes the initiative to find Shizune with Tonton's help. Kakashi arrives and finds out the situation. Unfortunately, he has another mission. So, he summons Pakkun who will guide Iruka to Naruto. Iruka follows Naruto and Pakkun, and sends Tonton back to the village. Pakkun leads them and they soon find Shizune. They chase after Mizuki, but they soon fall into a trap. Iruka reveals that Shizune is not herself, but actually Mizuki. Mizuki attacks Iruka while Naruto deals with Fujin and Raijin. Naruto soon finds that his attacks are ineffective.
144	13	"A New Squad! Two People and a Dog?!"; Transliteration: "Shin'sei Surī-Man Seru - Futari to Ippiki!" (Japanese: 新生三人一組(スリーマンセル) 二人と一匹！)	Masaaki Kumagai	Kou Hei Mushi	Hiromi Okazaki	July 20, 2005	March 1, 2008
Naruto is having trouble with the two brothers, and Iruka is having his share of difficulties with Mizuki. Iruka struggles to try to get the old Mizuki back, but Mizuki explains the only reason he was ever nice to Iruka was because he wanted to be the Hokage's favorite too. He wanted Iruka to be miserable, and not to have everyone else be so kind to Iruka and not himself. Iruka and Mizuki then prepare to fight again. Meanwhile, after many shadow clone attacks, Naruto finally has a chance to use Rasengan. The brothers accidentally destroy their lunch and make Naruto's attack hit his shadow clones. As they prepare to kill him, Shikamaru, Choji, and Ino come to the rescue.
145	14	"A New Formation: Ino–Shika–Chō!"; Transliteration: "Sakuretsu! Nyū Fōmēshon Ino–Shika–Chō" (Japanese: 炸裂！ニューフォーメーションいのシカチョウ)	Directed by : Hayato Goda; Storyboarded by : Toshiya Niidome	Kou Hei Mushi	Kenichiro Ogata	July 27, 2005	March 1, 2008
Team 10 tells Naruto that they will take care of the brothers, and use their combined skills to immobilize them. Naruto leaves to catch up to Iruka, who is fighting Mizuki in a building used to test academy instructors. It is revealed that Iruka and Mizuki are childhood friends, although Mizuki only hoped to get close to the Hokage. Mizuki reveals that he has become stronger and learned new techniques while in prison, and destroys the building they are in.
146	15	"Remaining Ambition: Orochimaru's Shadow"; Transliteration: "Nokosa-reta Yabō - Orochimaru no Kage" (Japanese: 残された野望 大蛇丸の影)	Masahiko Murata	Yuka Miyata	Seiko Asai	August 10, 2005	March 8, 2008
Naruto, Iruka, and Pakkun meet up with Mizuki's fiancée Tsubaki, and she has come to offer help to the three, feeling responsible for not having stopped him earlier. Meanwhile, Shikamaru, Ino, and Choji are having trouble holding the two brothers off, and they know that they can't defeat them, so they are stalling for time. Meanwhile, Tsunade discovers a startling secret about Mizuki and Orochimaru and leaves to intervene. Naruto, Iruka, Pakkun, and Tsubaki finally reach Mizuki, but it is too late, he has already completed the formula he was making. Now that he has drunk it, he turns into a new monstrous form. And, Naruto has recognized Mizuki's transformation as one nearly identical to that of Orochimaru's Cursed Seal.
147	16	"A Clash of Fate: You Can't Bring Me Down!"; Transliteration: "In'nen no Taiketsu! Omae ni Ore wa Taosenee" (Japanese: 因縁の対決！オマエにオレは倒せねえ)	Directed by : Tsuyoshi Matsumoto; Storyboarded by : Tsubute Hyakuno	Yuka Miyata	Yukiko Ban	August 17, 2005	March 8, 2008
Mizuki is determined to make Naruto and Iruka suffer, and it appears like he has the upper edge with his improved strength and speed. Meanwhile, Ino, Choji, and Shikamaru are at their limits, and now Fujin and Raijin are free. That is until Tsunade shows up and defeats them both easily. Fujin and Raijin surrender and agree to return peacefully to the institution. Mizuki on the other hand has converted all of his speed to power and prepares to finish Naruto off. But, Iruka thinks up a plan and traps Mizuki, giving Naruto the final chance to use the Rasengan on him. Mizuki reverts to his original form, badly damaged when Tsunade shows up and explains everything about the potion Mizuki took. Mizuki will no longer be able to fight as a Shinobi. Iruka offers to treat everyone at the ramen bar, and thinks about how Naruto saved him the same way he had saved him before.
Bikōchū Search
148	17	"The Search for the Rare Bikōchū Beetle"; Transliteration: "Chō Tsuibiryoku ni Akamaru mo Shitto! Maboroshi no Bikōchū o Sagase" (Japanese: 超追尾力に赤丸も嫉妬！幻の微香虫を探せ)	Chiyuki Tanaka	Satoru Nishizono	Yasuhiko Kanezuka	August 17, 2005	March 15, 2008
Naruto is frustrated by Mizuki's inability to lead him to Sasuke or Orochimaru and begins pestering Tsunade to allow him to look for him. Hinata sympathizes with Naruto and suggests trying to find a way to help him. Shino realizes that a Bikochu, a very rare insect, could track down Sasuke if it smelled his scent. As Kurenai Yuhi is being hospitalized for injuries suffered during the prison break, Shino is tasked with leading Team 8 to find the Bikochu and Naruto joins as the fourth member. It is also revealed that Hinata is practicing a new defensive technique, and has nearly mastered it.
149	18	"What's the Difference? Don't All Insects Look Alike?"; Transliteration: "Doko ga Chigau no Sa!? Mushitte Onaji Mienaika" (Japanese: どこが違うのさ!? 虫って同じに見えないか)	Shigenori Kageyama	Satoru Nishizono	Jin Gu Kim	August 24, 2005	March 15, 2008
The original members of Team 8 realize that they are being followed by hostile bug-users (Kamizuru Clan), but decide not to engage them or tell Naruto about the enemy's presence, for fear of endangering the Bikochu. Hinata begins to worry that she is hindering her group, but eventually manages to locate the Bikochu with her Byakugan, allowing Naruto to capture it. Before Team 8 can leave the forest, Hinata is ambushed and abducted by the bug users, who demand the Bikochu in return for her safety.
150	19	"A Battle of Bugs! The Deceivers and the Deceived!"; Transliteration: "Damashite Bakashite Damasarete! Sōzetsu Mushimushi Dai Batoru" (Japanese: だまして化かしてだまされて！壮絶ムシムシ大バトル)	Toshiya Niidome	Satoru Nishizono	Masaru Hyodo	August 31, 2005	March 22, 2008
It is revealed that the bug users who kidnapped Hinata are part of a clan that was an old rival of the Aburame clan. It seeks to recover a scroll using the Bikochu in order to restore its former glory. Hinata's companions hide the Bikochu and attempt to rescue her, but are lured into a trap. Hinata attempts to escape, but is swept down a river while stuck in a cocoon.
151	20	"Blaze Away, Byakugan! This Is My Ninja Way!"; Transliteration: "Moe yo Byakugan! Kore ga Watashi no Nindō yo" (Japanese: 燃えよ白眼！これが私の忍道よ)	Toshiyuki Tsuru	Satoru Nishizono	Hirofumi Suzuki	September 14, 2005	March 22, 2008
Hinata's companions are captured by the Kamizuru Clan, who attempt to search for the Bikochu, Hinata successfully escapes, and destroys all of the rival bug users' insects with her new technique and forces them away, saving her companions. While trying to retrieve Sasuke's forehead protector, Naruto accidentally farts on the Bikochu, causing it to memorise his scent instead of Sasuke's. Although the mission fails to find a way of locating Sasuke, Sakura gets very angry at Naruto and start chases him with the Bikochu following Naruto's scent, while Hinata appears more confident and her father seems to respect her more.
Kurosuki Family Removal
152	21	"Funeral March for the Living"; Transliteration: "Sei Aru Mono e no Sōsōkyoku" (Japanese: 生あるものへの葬送曲)	Directed by : Hayato Goda; Storyboarded by : Shinji Satō	Yasuyuki Suzuki	Kenichiro Ogata	September 21, 2005	March 29, 2008
When Naruto saves three guys, he is dragged into yet another mission. However, unlike the last two this is one he does not wish to partake in. However, when Guy reveals information that the leader of the Kurosuki Family, Raiga, is connected with the Seven Swordsman of the Mist, Naruto decides to change his mind, since Zabuza Momochi and Kisame Hoshigaki were each a part of the group. Lee concludes that as Kisame is Itachi's partner in Akatsuki, finding Itachi may bring them closer to Sasuke. With Neji, Lee, and Tenten as his allies, the group goes on their new mission.
153	22	"A Lesson Learned: The Iron Fist of Love!"; Transliteration: "Kokoro no Todoke! Ai no Tekken" (Japanese: 心に届け！愛の鉄拳)	Directed by : Masaaki Kumagai; Storyboarded by : Tsubute Hyakuno	Junki Takegami	Hiromi Okazaki	September 28, 2005	March 29, 2008
Out to try and save Roukusuke, Naruto and the others ambush members of the Kurosuki Family and save an old man. They soon hear the funeral bell and go and save Roukusuke. However, Rock Lee meets an old friend among the group, and Lee must now convince Karashi to return to his old way of life. Their time together is cut short, as Raiga watches from the sidelines. Naruto and his team pursue Raiga into a thick fog, and find that Raiga is able to conceal himself from even the Byakugan.
154	23	"The Enemy of the Byakugan"; Transliteration: "Byakugan no Tenteki" (Japanese: 白眼の天敵)	Directed by : Yuki Hayashi; Storyboarded by : Toshiya Niidome	Yasuyuki Suzuki	Zenjirō Ukulele	October 5, 2005	April 5, 2008
With Neji unable to see through the mist, the group loses the advantage of his eyesight. He is tricked into thinking that random objects are real people by a mysterious jutsu. Rock Lee manages to hold Raiga off by fighting while still unconscious. When a mysterious case is knocked off of Raiga's back, Raiga becomes weaker and is eventually defeated by Naruto. When the gang opens the case, they discover a young boy named Ranmaru, who has been riding on Raiga's back the entire time. Ranmaru reveals that Raiga cared for him, and that he helps Raiga fight by serving as his "eyes".
155	24	"The Dark Creeping Clouds"; Transliteration: "Shinobi Yoru An'un" (Japanese: 忍び寄る暗雲)	Shigenori Kageyama	Junki Takegami	Jin Gu Kim & Ik Hyun Eum	October 12, 2005	April 5, 2008
With Raiga seemingly dead, the gang heads back to find Karashi waiting for them. It turns out to be a trap as the Kurosuki Family ambushes them. Luckily, Naruto fools them not once, but twice, with his clones. With the enemies defeated, the villagers focus their anger on Karashi. Rock Lee intercepts them and says that Karashi is still young and weak, and that it is partially his fault Karashi joined the Kurosuki Family. Lee begs them to let him return to his mother, promising to punish Karashi himself if he should fall from grace. The villagers agree and the group heads back, but not before picking up Ranmaru. They head back to the Curry of Life shop for a meal, where Naruto tries to retrieve information from Ranmaru. Ranmaru has Karashi take him to the canyon where Raiga fell, and uses his own chakra to revive him.
156	25	"Raiga's Counterattack"; Transliteration: "Gyakushū no Raiga" (Japanese: 逆襲の雷牙)	Directed by : Hayato Goda; Storyboarded by : Shinji Satō	Yasuyuki Suzuki	Zenjirō Ukulele	October 19, 2005	April 12, 2008
Raiga awakes to find Ranmaru unconscious. Tenten has no choice but to engage Raiga by herself, but is eventually defeated. Raiga then demands that Karashi turn over Lee, Neji and Naruto to him, threatening to kill him and his mother. Karashi tricks the group into going to Raiga, and attempts to escape with his mother. Tenten returns with Ranmaru, insisting that he live because it is a choice his and Raiga's victims did not have, and has Sanshou make the Curry of Life for him. Elsewhere, Naruto, Lee and Neji are faring badly against Raiga, who is using a thunderstorm to increase his power, but Sanshou heads out to provide curry for them.
157	26	"Run! The Curry of Life!"; Transliteration: "Hashire!!! Inochi no Karē" (Japanese: 走れ!!! 生命(いのち)のカレー)	Masahiko Murata	Junki Takegami	Seiko Asai	October 26, 2005	April 12, 2008
Naruto Uzumaki, Rock Lee and Neji Hyuga continue their fight against Raiga Kurosuki, with Raiga utilizing a local thunderstorm to provide him with a practically infinite source of lightning to use. Raiga manages to knock all of them out with his electricity, but Sanshou, Tenten, Karashi and Ranmaru give them the Curry of Life, but accidentally intoxicate Lee in the process. Ranmaru returns to Raiga, telling him the four are dead, and with his viewpoint of the world changed by the Konoha ninja, attempts to lead Raiga off a cliff. This fails when a drunken Lee attacks Raiga, who angrily dispatches him. Ranmaru attempts to get Raiga to stop the battle, but Raiga attacks him, accusing him of abandoning him. Naruto returns, though and defeats Raiga by punching him off a ledge, from which Raiga commits suicide by using lightning to incinerate his body. Ranmaru begins training alongside Karashi as an apprentice at the curry shop and Naruto's team returns to Konoha.
Standalone side story
158	27	"Follow My Lead! The Great Survival Challenge"; Transliteration: "Minna Ore ni Tsuite Koi! Ase to Namida no Takurami Dai Sabaibaru" (Japanese: みんなオレについて来い！汗と涙のタクラミ大サバイバル)	Directed by : Tsuyoshi Matsumoto; Storyboarded by : Toshiya Niidome	Kou Hei Mushi	Hidehiko Okano & Takenori Tsukuma	November 2, 2005	April 19, 2008
Each of Konoha's Genin have been assigned to lead a squad of three academy students in a survival exercise. Naruto is teamed up with Konohamaru and his two friends. The three find out that Naruto's leadership, navigation, and foraging skills leave much to be desired and they end up lost in the mountains during a thunderstorm. They learn to pull their strengths to survive the mountains long enough for help to arrive. Then they blame Naruto for getting them into the disaster.
Gosunkugi Capture
159	28	"The Bounty Hunter from the Wilderness"; Transliteration: "Teki ka Mikata ka!? Kōya no Shōkin Kasegi" (Japanese: 敵か味方か!? 荒野の賞金稼ぎ)	Directed by : Masaaki Kumagai; Storyboarded by : Tsubute Hyakuno	Yasuyuki Suzuki	Hiromi Okazaki	November 9, 2005	April 19, 2008
Naruto, Hinata and Kiba accept what they believe will be an easy mission to catch a crook. Upon arriving at the thief's last known location, however, they learn that another bounty hunter is pursuing the thief and that the thief is a skilled ninja. The bounty hunter is wounded in the battle, and Naruto's group take him to safety, but discover that he, too, is a wanted criminal.
160	29	"Hunt or Be Hunted?! Showdown at the O.K. Temple!"; Transliteration: "Eru ka Erareru ka!? Okkē Tera no Kettō" (Japanese: 獲るか獲られるか!? オッケー寺の決斗)	Directed by : Yuki Hayashi; Storyboarded by : Toshiya Niidome	Yasuyuki Suzuki	Zenjirō Ukulele	November 16, 2005	April 26, 2008
The bounty hunter reveals that he was framed for killing a family and that the thief that he and Naruto's group is hunting is the culprit. He wants to capture him to clear his name. The four locate the thief in a nearby city, in the process of attempting to steal a valuable bell. After the bounty hunter captures the thief, he is captured himself and his innocence is revealed. Despite this, Naruto's group fails the mission because they did not capture the thief.
Standalone side story
161	30	"The Appearance of Strange Visitors"; Transliteration: "Chinkyaku Kenzan - Ao no Yajū? Mōjū? ...Chinjū?" (Japanese: 珍客見参 碧の野獣？猛獣？…珍獣？)	Directed by : Hayato Goda; Storyboarded by : Chiyuki Tanaka	Yasuyuki Suzuki	Akihiro Tsuda & Shinmei Saito	November 23, 2005	April 26, 2008
Two outsiders, Mondai and Potcha, come to infiltrate the village and gather its secrets by disguising themselves as Might Guy and Rock Lee, while the real Guy and Lee are out on a mission. They are oblivious to the fact that their disguises are fooling nobody, except for Naruto. Tsunade, Sakura, and Tenten string them along by giving them outrageous missions, preventing them from learning anything. The real Lee and Guy return to kick their impostors off into the distance, and discover that Naruto never realized the truth.
Cursed Warrior Extermination
162	31	"The Cursed Warrior"; Transliteration: "Shiroki Noroi Musha" (Japanese: 白き呪い武者)	Directed by : Kiyomu Fukuda; Storyboarded by : Shigenori Kageyama	Junki Takegami	Jin Gu Kim & Ik Hyun Eum	November 30, 2005	May 3, 2008
Naruto, Neji, and Tenten are sent by Tsunade to the Land of Birds to investigate reports of a ghost, Noroimusha, terrorizing the local population. Upon arriving, they learn that the daimyō has died, and that his son, the successor, cares little about his duties due to the recent death of his sister. Later that evening, the Konoha ninja encounter Noroimusha and give chase. After cornering it, however, an examination by Neji's Byakugan makes the group realize that the armor the Noroimusha is wearing is empty.
163	32	"The Tactician's Intent"; Transliteration: "Sakushi: Kōmei no Omowaku" (Japanese: 策士・紅明の思惑)	Directed by : Yoshihiro Sugai; Storyboarded by : Tsubute Hyakuno	Junki Takegami	Minoru Morita	December 7, 2005	May 3, 2008
The episode starts with the group talking at Mousou's house. After that they discuss that Koumei, the village strategist and the son's potential rival for succession, may be behind the Noroimusha. To prove this, they try to visit the new feudal lord Sagi at a lake where he holds his lost memories of his sister Toki. The group protects the feudal lord from assassins, and pursues the Noroimusha to its meeting with Koumei, where after it is defeated, it is revealed that it and the previous Noroimusha were two different individuals. The group finds evidence that indicates that Koumei may have been behind the second Noroimusha's appearance, and Koumei is arrested.
164	33	"Too Late for Help"; Transliteration: "Ososugita Suketto" (Japanese: 遅すぎた助っ人)	Directed by : Tsuyoshi Matsumoto; Storyboarded by : Shinji Satō	Junki Takegami	Hidehiko Okano & Takenori Tsukuma	December 14, 2005	May 10, 2008
The episode starts with Mousou stating the mission is over. However, Naruto is skeptical, and investigates where he and his companions fought the Noroimusha. He finds a secret passage to the feudal lord's mansion, but is caught. When Chishima goes to warn Mousou about Naruto investigating, he accidentally sees Mousou meeting with Watari ninja. Chishima tries to escape to inform the others about this development, but is pursued and injured by the Watari ninja. The Noroimusha arrives in Naruto's cell and he is sentenced to death.
165	34	"The Death of Naruto"; Transliteration: "Naruto Shisu" (Japanese: ナルト死す)	Directed by : Masaaki Kumagai; Storyboarded by : Toshiya Niidome	Junki Takegami	Hiromi Okazaki	December 21, 2005	May 10, 2008
The episode starts with Neji, Tenten, and Kakashi staring at a grave. As they head back they throw off a pursuer with a replacement, but are being shadowed by another. Koumei is about to be forced to commit seppuku, but the Noroimusha saves him. Shortly afterwards, it is revealed that Naruto disguised himself as the Noroimusha. Kakashi fights Nagare, who uses moves copied from other ninja. Naruto, Neji and Tenten discover that the true identity of the Noroimusha is the feudal lord himself, who seeks to kill Mousou and avenge his father.
166	35	"When Time Stands Still"; Transliteration: "Tomatta Mama no Jikan" (Japanese: 止まったままの時間)	Directed by : Taiki Nishimura; Storyboarded by : Ichizō Kobayashi	Junki Takegami	Dae Hoon Kim	January 4, 2006	May 17, 2008
The episode begins with a flashback that reveals that Sagi has died, and that Toki took on her brother's identity to avenge his death. Toki assumes the identity of the Noroimusha and attempts to attack Mousou, but is subdued by Mousou's imitation ninjutsu. Mousou's Watari ninjas and Naruto's group join the battle. While his companions fight the Watari ninja, Naruto pursues Mousou and is caught in a genjutsu.
167	36	"When Egrets Flap Their Wings"; Transliteration: "Shirasagi no Habataku Jikan" (Japanese: 白鷺の羽ばたく時間)	Directed by : Hayato Goda; Storyboarded by : Tsubute Hyakuno	Junki Takegami	Zenjirō Ukulele	January 4, 2006	May 17, 2008
Mousou reveals himself to be Hoki the migrating ninja, who plans to travel and collect as many jutsus as possible. He seemingly kills Chishima and knocks Naruto underwater. Naruto awakens when Sagi's ghost asks him to save Toki from her desire for revenge and defeat Mousou. Naruto rises from the water and punches Hoki, then tells Toki that he has seen Sagi. Naruto then fights against and defeats Hoki with the Naruto Uzumaki Barrage. Chishima turns out to have survived Hoki's attack. Toki apologizes to her subjects for deceiving them, but asks them to allow her to remain ruler in order to restore the Bird Country. After the group leaves, Neji tells Naruto that the first Cursed Warrior they encountered was a real ghost, much to his big horror.
Standalone side story
168	37	"Mix It, Stretch It, Boil It Up! Burn Copper Pot, Burn!"; Transliteration: "Moero Zundō! Mazete Nobashite Yude Agero!!" (Japanese: 燃えろ寸胴！混ぜて伸ばして茹で上げろ!!)	Directed by : Kiyomu Fukuda; Storyboarded by : Shigenori Kageyama	Satoru Nishizono	Jin Gu Kim & Ik Hyun Eum	January 18, 2006	May 24, 2008
This episode pays tribute to cooking-themed anime series such as Chūka Ichiban and Yakitate!! Japan. Naruto, Choji and Sakura volunteer to help Teuchi, whose daughter Ayame was kidnapped by a band of cooking ninja. To save her they must come up with the ultimate ramen recipe. Teuchi tries to teach them how to cook, and the three take advantage of their ninja techniques to make the perfect bowl of ramen. When they rescue Ayame, she has grown fat due to being unable to resist the cooking ninjas' food. To bring her to her regular self, she eats Teuchi's diet ramen that appears to be designed to make people lose weight from eating it. The episode ends by showing almost every single female ninja in the show lined up for ramen. However, in the end it shows Teuchi eating the diet ramen and losing too much weight.
Kaima Capture
169	38	"Remembrance: The Lost Page"; Transliteration: "Kioku - Ushinawa-reta Pēji" (Japanese: 記憶 失われた頁(ページ))	Toshiya Niidome	Yuka Miyata	Masaru Hyodo	January 25, 2006	May 24, 2008
Anko Mitarashi is dispatched to the Land of the Sea with Naruto, Shino, and Ino to investigate the nature of the "Kaima" monster. Upon arriving, Anko recalls her time with Orochimaru in this area, and her Cursed Seal begins to resonate and cause her pain. At the docks, the group sees Yoroi Akado and Misumi Tsurugi accosting a young girl. Naruto chases them away, but does not recognize them. When the group sets off to one of the islands, Yoroi and Misumi attack, and Naruto nearly drowns until he is saved by the girl he saw earlier.
170	39	"The Closed Door"; Transliteration: "Shōgeki - Tozasa-reta Doa" (Japanese: 衝撃 閉ざされた扉(ドア))	Atsushi Takeyama	Yuka Miyata	Minoru Morita	February 1, 2006	May 31, 2008
Naruto awakens in the girl's hut, where she identifies herself as Isaribi. Upon thanking her, Naruto realizes that she is being ostracized by the local residents, and he angrily chases away the children that have arrived to torment her. Meanwhile, Orochimaru is meeting with Amachi, a scientist conducting experiments under his direction. Sasuke is also present, and ends their conversation when it is directed towards him. The remaining members of Team Anko have arrived at the island, where they are briefed on the payment schedule that they have to defend, and they locate the Demon of the Ocean (Kaima) in the meantime. However, Naruto arrives, and identifies the Kaima as Isaribi. The arrival of Yoroi enables Isaribi to escape, and the two escape. Anko attempts to pursue but is paralyzed by pain from her Cursed Seal and falls unconscious.
171	40	"Infiltration: The Set-Up!"; Transliteration: "Sen'nyū - Shikuma-reta Torappu" (Japanese: 潜入 仕組まれた罠(トラップ))	Directed by : Yūki Kinoshita; Storyboarded by : Tsubute Hyakuno	Yuka Miyata	Yasuhiko Kanezuka	February 8, 2006	May 31, 2008
While in the beach, Anko, still unconscious, is being tended by Ino. Meanwhile, Naruto explains his encounter with Isaribi earlier. The episode continues back into Anko's sudden remembrance of her memories. She sees Orochimaru approaching her, telling her that the Hokage knows about their experiments. Shino, Naruto and Ino decided to continue their original mission: To protect the official payments and capture the Kaima (Isaribi). The group heads to Demon Island (Kikaijima), an island located in the Land of the Sea where supposedly the Kaima resides. Anko awakes and explains that the Kaima (Demon of the Ocean) is a human who has undergone physical transmutations. While they are talking, Yoroi and Isaribi head underwater to Orochimaru's lair. Inside, Isaribi passes on the information relating to the official payments and asks when she will return to normal. Yoroi tells her that she is a prototype and when he is done collecting information from her, he would change her back. He also sends her to dispatch Naruto and the rest of the group who has just arrived on the shore. Shino, Naruto and Ino find themselves in an experimental laboratory with many creatures contained in test pillars. Isaribi approaches from behind and triggers a trapdoor. The three genin fall through the trapdoor and Anko appears behind Isaribi with a kunai at her throat. Isaribi gets away and leaves Anko locked in the room facing three large lion-like animal mutations. Anko makes quick work of the three, only leaving the curse mark to pain her. The rest of the team faces Yoroi Akado, who is working for the enemy. Shino takes up the challenge while Naruto and Ino continue running to catch up with Anko. Anko, Naruto and Ino find themselves facing Amachi and Isaribi. Amachi and Isaribi run off just while Misumi Tsurugi comes to face them. Ino uses her mind manipulation jutsu to restrain him. Shino's opponent disappears as the island begins to collapse. Isaribi, Amachi and Yoroi escape on a ship, leaving Team Anko to die in the collapsing building. Naruto frantically searches for an exit.
172	41	"Despair: A Fractured Heart"; Transliteration: "Zetsubō - Hikisaka-reta Hāto" (Japanese: 絶望 引き裂かれた心(ハート))	Directed by : Taiki Nishimura; Storyboarded by : Ichizō Kobayashi	Yuka Miyata & Junki Takegami	Sang Yeob Kim	February 15, 2006	June 7, 2008
Anko rescues the team by summoning a giant snake, which takes the team in its mouth and breaks through the wall. Team Anko quickly pursues the enemy. After encountering Amachi, Naruto is caught in his attack and is able to use the Nine-Tails's chakra to free himself.
173	42	"Battle at Sea: The Power Unleashed!"; Transliteration: "Kaisen - Tokihanata-reta Pawā" (Japanese: 海戦 解き放たれた力(パワー))	Directed by : Masaaki Kumagai; Storyboarded by : Toshiya Niidome	Yuka Miyata & Junki Takegami	Hiromi Okazaki	February 22, 2006	June 7, 2008
The Nine-Tails within Naruto helps him beat Amachi. Although Amachi is quickly defeated and captured, the Sea Boss attacks Naruto. Naruto summons Gamabunta and defeats the monster by evaporating its nucleus, then gets beat up by Gama-sama (Gamabunta is a freshwater creature who is extremely uncomfortable in a saltwater environment). Isaribi realizes what Naruto said was right and that he did understand her because Naruto was also treated as a monster. With his help, Isaribi is able to overcome her anger. Afterward, Isaribi decides to go to Konoha in the hopes that Tsunade can cure her.
Standalone side story
174	43	"Impossible! Celebrity Ninja Art: Money Style Jutsu!"; Transliteration: "Arienēttebayo! Serebu Ninpō: Kinton no Jutsu" (Japanese: ありえねーってばよ！セレブ忍法・金遁の術)	Tsuyoshi Matsumoto	Kou Hei Mushi	Zenjirō Ukulele & Hidehiko Okano	March 1, 2006	June 14, 2008
Naruto is ordered to show a spoiled rich kid named Kunihisa a typical day in the life of a ninja. The kid has an annoying habit of continually flaunting his wealth to get whatever he wants. Trouble arises when kidnappers attempt to abduct the kid for ransom, and Kunihisa, out of money, is unable to summon his bodyguards, who have been paid off by the kidnappers. Naruto helps him to escape and teaches him that there are more important things in life than money.
Buried Gold Excavation
175	44	"The Treasure Hunt Is On!"; Transliteration: "Koko Hore Wan Wan! Maizōkin o Sagase" (Japanese: ここ掘れワンワン！埋蔵金を探せ)	Directed by : Kiyomu Fukuda; Storyboarded by : Shigenori Kageyama	Satoru Nishizono	Ik Hyun Eum & Seong Beom Kim	March 8, 2006	June 14, 2008
Naruto, Hinata, and Kiba are given a mission to find some treasure, and are told that if they fail to find it, they will be returned to the academy, due to Naruto's poor performance on his missions with Kiba and Hinata. They set out to find it, but Naruto and Kiba's arguments prevent them from cooperating. They are ambushed and trapped by three people copying their identities, sent by Tsunade's client, Agari Kaisen.
176	45	"Run, Dodge, Zigzag! Chase or Be Chased!"; Transliteration: "Shissō, Meisō, Jiguzagu-sō! Otte Owarete Machigaete" (Japanese: 疾走、迷走、ジグザグ走！追って追われて間違えて)	Directed by : Hayato Goda; Storyboarded by : Shinji Satō	Satoru Nishizono	Chiyuki Tanaka	March 15, 2006	June 21, 2008
Working together, the group escapes from the cave-in with the treasure, but learn that Hinata injured her leg. After realizing that Naruto and Kiba argue too often, and Hinata worries about them, they head into town to stop their copies. The group outwits and defeats their copies except Naruto, who uses demon fox chakra fueled shadow clones to defeat his copy, because his copy was running up a huge debt under his name, and ate all his food (including some ramen he was saving for a special occasion). Naruto's copy also accidentally bumped into Sakura, who was walking out of the library with an extremely tall stack of books. The copy then ridicules Sakura for being such a klutz, which angers her and leads her to unknowingly punch the real Naruto. Naruto, Kiba, and Hinata learn that the mission was a test to see if they could work together as a team, and that they passed it. Tsunade becomes upset when the "treasure" turns out to be a bill for services rendered.
Standalone side story
177	46	"Please, Mr. Postman!"; Transliteration: "Ō!? Purīzu ♥ Misutā Posutoman" (Japanese: OH(オー)!? ぷりーず♥みすたーぽすとまん)	Hiroshi Kimura	Yasuyuki Suzuki	Minoru Morita	March 22, 2006	June 21, 2008
Naruto finds Jiraiya with two women in a town and Jiraiya makes excuses and puts off his training to write his Icha Icha script. Naruto eventually decides to ghostwrite it. Naruto gets the manuscript for Icha Icha Tactics (English version, "Make Out Tactics") mixed up with a peace treaty between the Fang and Claw countries. The two must chase down the courier ninja before he delivers the wrong package and incites war. Unfortunately, the courier is absolutely committed to his duty and will stop at nothing to complete his delivery, no matter what the consequences may be. The wrong package eventually gets delivered but peace is still made between the two countries, as the recipient was a fan of Icha Icha and happily interpreted the document as a peace offering.
Star Guard
178	47	"Encounter! The Boy with a Star's Name"; Transliteration: "Deai "Hoshi" no Na o Motsu Shōnen" (Japanese: 出会い｢星｣の名を持つ少年)	Directed by : Atsushi Nigorikawa; Storyboarded by : Seiji Okuda	Junki Takegami	Sang Yeob Kim	March 29, 2006	June 28, 2008
Tenten, Neji, and Rock Lee are assigned to a mission to protect the star belonging to the Hidden Village of Star. When Naruto hears of the star's special chakra enhancing power he decides he too must go along because of his assumption that Orochimaru may be involved. Naruto manages to convince Tsunade to allow him to join Team Guy's mission by bribing her with an expensive treat. Naruto and Team Guy encounter Sumaru of the Hidden Village of Star, who guides them past the poison gasses that surround the Village after demonstrating techniques with strange purple chakra. The Konoha genin meet with the substitute Hoshikage, Akahoshi, who explains Hidden Star's desire to become one of the Five main Hidden Villages. Sumaru expresses his desire to become the first true Hoshikage of Hidden Star, which intrigues Naruto who rushes off after Sumaru in the direction of the place where the village's star is held. Naruto and Sumaru see someone fleeing from the building containing the star and Naruto runs off in pursuit. Sumaru discovers that the star has been stolen and chases after the thief. The thief manages to escape from Naruto, and it is revealed that they were using techniques exclusive to those who had star training, meaning they were once a member of the Star village.
179	48	"The Remembered Lullaby"; Transliteration: "Natsuhi Boshi - Omoide no Komori Uta" (Japanese: ナツヒボシ 思い出の子守唄)	Directed by : Masaaki Kumagai; Storyboarded by : Toshiya Niidome	Junki Takegami	Yasuhiko Kanezuka	April 5, 2006	June 28, 2008
With the star stolen, the group has no leads on the mysterious thief who can use chakra to fly. Naruto learns that Sumaru's parents died defending the star from foreign ninja. Tenten and Lee attempt to track two of Akahoshi's men, but are discovered and find no answers. Sumaru and some of his friends find a masked ninja and restrain him, but he renders them unconscious and kidnaps Sumaru.

== Home media release ==
=== English ===
==== DVD ====
Naruto Uncut (USA)
Volume	Date	Discs	Episodes	Reference
10	October 14, 2008	3	121–135	
11	December 16, 2008	3	136–149	
12	February 10, 2009	3	150–163	
13	April 7, 2009	3	164–177	
14	May 26, 2009	3	178–191	

Naruto Season Box Set (USA)
Box Set	Date	Discs	Episodes	Reference
Season 3, Vol. 1	June 29, 2010	6	107–135	
Season 3, Vol. 2	August 31, 2010	6	136–163	
Season 4, Vol. 1	October 26, 2010	6	164–191	

Naruto Unleashed (UK)
Volume	Date	Box Set Release	Disc	Episodes	Reference
Series 6 Part 1	April 20, 2009	October 26, 2009	3	131–143	
Series 6 Part 2	June 29, 2009	October 26, 2009	3	144–156	
Series 7 Part 1	August 24, 2009	February 1, 2010	3	157–169	
Series 7 Part 2	October 26, 2009	February 1, 2010	3	170–182	

Naruto Uncut (AUS / NZ)
Collection	Episodes	DVD release date	Reference
10	121–135	February 18, 2009	
11	136–149	April 15, 2009	
12	150–163	June 24, 2009	
13	164–177	August 19, 2009	
14	178–191	October 21, 2009	

Naruto Origins (AUS / NZ)
Collection	Episodes	DVD release date	Reference
3	107–163		
4	164–220		

==== Blu-ray ====
Viz Media (Region 1/A)
Set	Date	Discs	Episodes	References
5	October 19, 2021	4	111–137	
6	March 1, 2022	4	138–165	
7	June 14, 2022	4	166–192	
