= Naruto the Movie: Ninja Clash in the Land of Snow =

- Theatrical release poster

Japanese name
- Kanji: 劇場版 NARUTO 大活劇! 雪姫忍法帖だってばよ!!
Transcriptions
- Revised Hepburn: Gekijōban Naruto Daikatsugeki! Yukihime Ninpōchō dattebayo!!
- Directed by: Tensai Okamura
- Written by: Katsuyuki Sumisawa
- Based on: Naruto by Masashi Kishimoto
- Produced by: Manyo Oshikiri; Tomoko Gushima
- Starring: Junko Takeuchi; Yūko Kaida; Tsutomu Isobe
- Cinematography: Atsuho Matsumoto
- Edited by: Seiji Morita
- Music by: Toshio Masuda
- Production company: Studio Pierrot
- Distributed by: Toho
- Release date: August 21, 2004
- Running time: 82 minutes
- Country: Japan
- Language: Japanese
- Box office: $11.1 million

Naruto the Movie: Ninja Clash in the Land of Snow (劇場版 NARUTO(ナルト) 大活劇! 雪姫忍法帖だってばよ!!, Gekijō-ban Naruto Daikatsugeki! Yukihime Ninpōchō Dattebayo!!; lit. 'Theatrical Feature Naruto: Great Action Scene! Snow Princess' Book of Ninja Arts') is a 2004 anime martial arts fantasy adventure film based on Masashi Kishimoto's manga and anime Naruto. It was released in Japan on August 21, 2004. The film is set after the episode 101 of the Naruto anime series. In the United States, the film aired on Cartoon Network's Toonami block on September 8, 2007. The ending song Home Sweet Home is performed by Yuki Isoya. The English adaptation replaced the song with Jeremy Sweet's "Never Give Up", due to licensing restrictions.

In the film, Naruto Uzumaki and his Team 7 work on a bodyguard mission to protect Princess Koyuki Kazahana, who is posing as a film actress.

An original video animation, Konoha Annual Sports Festival (木ノ葉運動会 Konoha Undōkai), was included with the Japanese release of the film. The film grossed US$11.1 million in the box offices and received generally positive reviews from critics for the animation, voice acting, emotional depth, action sequences and musical score, however the screenplay and character of Koyuki were met with a more divided response.

== Plot ==
Naruto Uzumaki, Sasuke Uchiha, and Sakura Haruno watch a film starring Yukie Fujikaze, in a local cinema. Kakashi Hatake has summoned them to watch it as preparation for their next mission: to prevent Yukie, who plays Princess Gale in the films, from being captured during production of her latest film. Yukie is later revealed to be Koyuki Kazahana, a princess from an island known as the Land of Snow. Doto Kazahana, who is revealed to be Koyuki's uncle, was responsible for the murder of her father Sosetsu in a coup d'etat.

During the shooting of the film, Doto's henchmen, wearing chakra armor, attempt to capture the princess, but Team 7 manages to delay the princess from being captured. Doto eventually captures Koyuki and kills her bodyguards, who reveal themselves in an attempt to protect and restore her rightful place as the ruler of the Land of Snow. Naruto enters the ship to rescue the princess, only to be captured and forced to wear a chakra-draining device. Doto forces Koyuki to hand over a crystal necklace her father had given her when she was young, thinking that this is a key that can unlock the hidden treasure Sosetsu had left behind before detaining both Koyuki and Naruto.

Sasuke, Sakura, and Kakashi infiltrate the fortress while Naruto and Koyuki escape from captivity. They confront Doto but he manages to capture the crystal necklace and flees with Koyuki. Naruto proceeds to follow Doto while the remaining members of Team 7 confront Doto's henchmen. Kakashi gets his revenge by defeating Doto's henchman Nadare Roga, while Sasuke and Sakura defeat the other two henchmen Fubuki Kakuyoku and Mizore Fuyukuma. Meanwhile, Doto discovers the hidden treasure to transform the island into the Land of Spring using a heat generator.

Naruto confronts him in a duel, but gets overpowered while Sasuke uses his Chidori (千鳥; lit. 'One Thousand Birds') to weaken Doto's armour. Soon after, Naruto releases his energy and uses his new Seven Colored Chakra Rasengan, killing Doto and activating a mirror to transform the land. In the aftermath, Koyuki decides to reclaim her rightful place of royalty and even mentions personally with Team 7 that even in the life of royalty, her acting career will not end. Soon after the adventure, Naruto receives an envelope by Sasuke and Sakura with a picture of him being kissed by Koyuki/Yukie in the hospital signed by Koyuki/Yukie where they get ready to embark on a new adventure together as Team 7.

== Cast ==
Role	Japanese actor	American actor
Naruto Uzumaki	Junko Takeuchi	Maile Flanagan
Sasuke Uchiha	Noriaki Sugiyama	Yuri Lowenthal
Sakura Haruno	Chie Nakamura	Kate Higgins
Kakashi Hatake	Kazuhiko Inoue	Dave Wittenberg
Sōsetsu Kazahana	Hidehiko Ishizuka	Cam Clarke
Koyuki Kazahana/Yukie Fujikaze	Yūko Kaida	Kari Wahlgren
Nadare Rōga	Hirotaka Suzuoki	Liam O'Brien
Sandayū Asama	Ikuo Nishikawa	Daran Norris
Fubuki Kakuyoku	Jun Karasawa	Cindy Robinson
Mizore Fuyukuma	Holly Kaneko	Kyle Hebert
Dotō Kazahana	Tsutomu Isobe	Lex Lang
Director Makino	Chikao Ōtsuka	Michael McConnohie
Assistant Director	Akimitsu Takase	Sam Riegel
Kin/Buriken	Yutaka Nakano	Doug Stone
Hidero	Kan Tanaka	Jamieson Price
Michy	Tōru Furusawa	Crispin Freeman

== Release ==
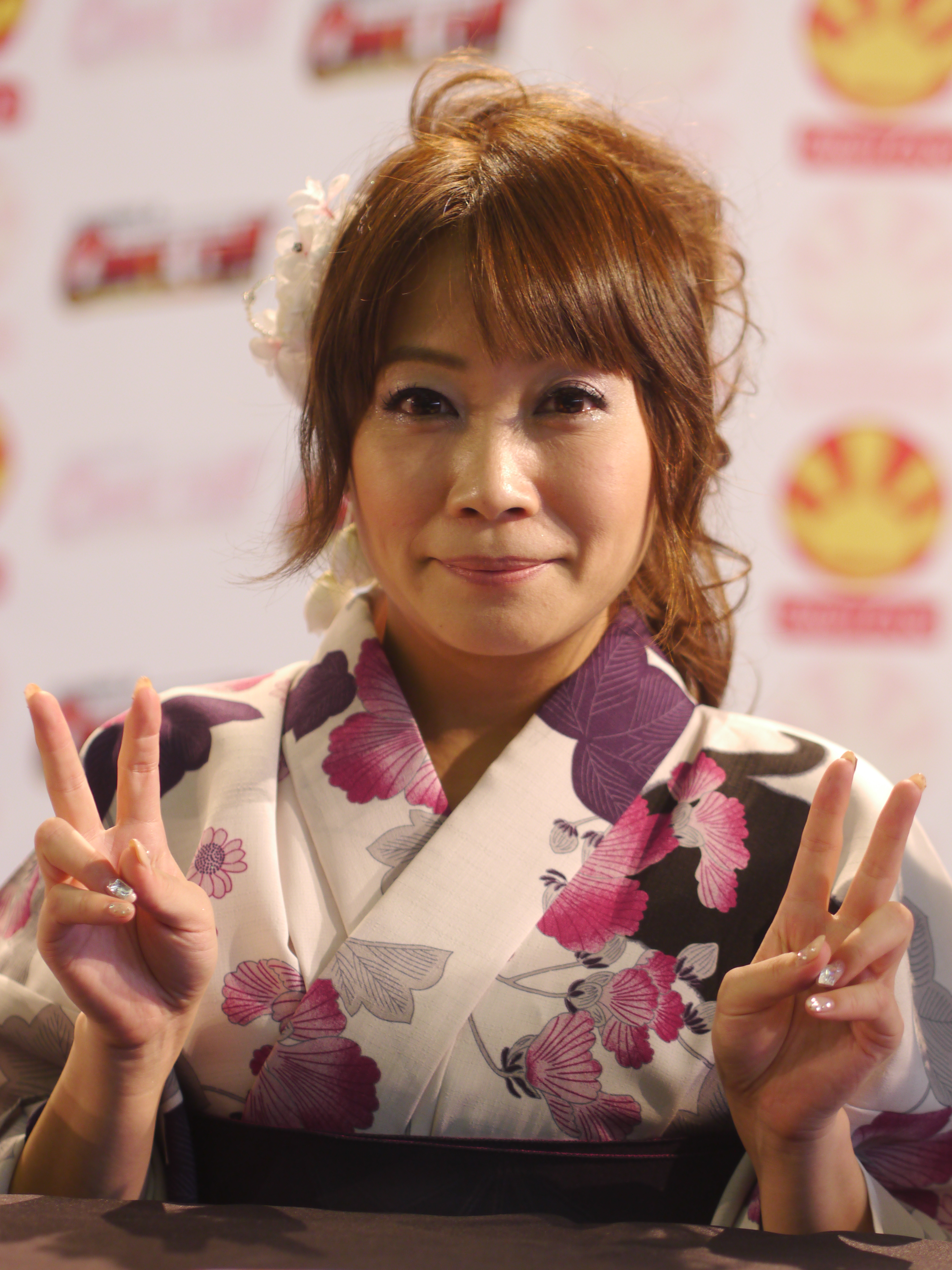
Voice actress Junko Takeuchi expressed difficulties in voicing Naruto Uzumaki.

The film was originally released in Japan on August 21, 2004. It was later released on DVD on April 28, 2005. The film was released in 160 theaters in the United States as a one-day showing on June 6, 2007, courtesy of Fathom Events. Fifty theaters in Canada would see a one-day showing on June 23, 2007. Madman Entertainment did a special one-day theater release in Australia on October 14, 2007. In 2007, the film was shown at the Fantasia Festival and in the British Museum. The film grossed $11,141,307 in the box offices.

The film uses most of the voice actors from the original television series with Junko Takeuchi returning as the role of the protagonist, Naruto Uzumaki. In contrast to the TV series, Takeuchi found this incarnation of the character to be more challenging to portray. She noticed multiple scenes where she had to yell such as when Naruto runs away from a train while holding Yukie. However, she felt that Naruto continued standing out as a character despite his young age such as when often talks about his ideals of not giving up to achieve his missions which contrast to her early skeptical views on him. Kakashi Hatake's voice actor Kazuhiko Inoue noted that he often assisted Takeuchi during recording of the movie in a similar manner to his character whose primary role is to support his students. As a result of the film being first recorded in Japanese, the actors expressed pressure and honor in delivering such roles.

The DVD release debuted at rank 25 on Nielsen Videoscan.

Instead of the OVA included with the Japanese release, the American release included a short featurette entitled World of Naruto, as well as a behind the scenes featurette afterwards with interviews with the main English cast and select members of the main Japanese cast. The OVA will, however, appear in the North American DVD release. The DVD was released on September 4, 2007. The film premiered on Cartoon Network on September 8, 2007. The film also played at Cineplex Odeon and Empire Theatres cinemas in Canada, distributed via Bell Satellite TV to play the film at all cinemas at the same time.

On November 13, 2007, a three-disc Deluxe Edition of the film was released. It has many extras and features that the standard DVD, released a few months earlier, did not include. It includes the ten-minute short "Konoha Annual Sports Festival" that was originally shown with the Japanese release of the film, the complete soundtrack to the movie, documentaries of the American voice recording of the movie, movie art postcards, and more.

== Reception ==
Naruto the Movie: Ninja Clash in the Land of Snow received positive reviews from critics.

Helen McCarthy in 500 Essential Anime Movies calls it "a good introduction to the main themes of the series, with ideas of persistence, determination, believing in yourself, and never giving up", and praises setting and backgrounds, "with the frozen Northern landscapes looking especially good". Active Anime stated that "Naruto the Movie is a lavish production and thrilling story that surpasses expectations." citing the multiple atmosphere which is reliable to the source material as a result of employing both dramatic and comical events. It was also praised based on its accessibility,

Comic Book Bin gave it a 7 out of 10, citing major violence that is not balanced by the audience the film is meant for and felt the lead Koyuki might not come across as a likable character based on the multiple twists given to her identity and mission. Nevertheless, Comic Book Bin praised the action scenes which were found likeable alongside Pierrot's animation. DVD Talk found the film enjoyable but lamented the main recurring heroes of the feature were often pushed aside in favor of the new characters. Nevertheless, the series praised the focus between Naruto and Yukie's relationship due to how similar they are and become closer in the narrative.

Comic Book Resources listed the film as the third best Naruto movie based on the user's Rotten Tomatoes score. The site praised the portrayal of the main trio with focus on Sasuke Uchiha due to his lack of appearances in subsequent movies, the narrative in general as well as technology that provided a more unique type of setting. In another article, the site found the animation and fights appealing and recommended it to the long time fans.
