= Naruto season 3 =

Naruto
- Season 3
- First Japanese home media volume cover of the season
- No. of episodes: 48

Release
- Original network: TV Tokyo
- Original release: May 19, 2004 – April 20, 2005

Season chronology
- ← Previous; Season 2 Next → Season 4

The third season of the Naruto anime television series, labelled as the "3rd Stage" in the Japanese DVD release, is directed by Hayato Date, and produced by Studio Pierrot and TV Tokyo. Based on Masashi Kishimoto's manga series of the same name, the season follows Naruto Uzumaki and his friends on a mission to prevent Sasuke Uchiha from leaving the Leaf Village in search for greater power by joining up with Orochimaru. The season ran on TV Tokyo and its affiliates, from May 19, 2004, to April 20, 2005.

The English dub aired on both Cartoon Network's Toonami and YTV's Bionix programming blocks from April 21, 2007, to January 12, 2008.

Sony Pictures Entertainment collected the episodes in a total of twelve DVD volumes, each containing four episodes, between January 1 and December 7, 2005. The English adaptation of these dub was released between twenty-first and thirty-second DVD volumes released by Viz Media, while various compilations were later released.

The Japanese version of this season features seven theme musics: two openings and five endings. The openings are "Go!!!" by Flow (used for episodes 84 to 106), "Seishun Kyōsōkyoku" (青春狂騒曲; lit. Youth's Rhapsody) by Sambomaster (used for episodes 107 to 131). The endings are "Ima Made Nando Mo" (今まで何度も; lit. Many Times Before) by The Mass Missile (used for episodes 84 to 89), "Ryūsei" (流星, lit. Meteor) by TiA (used for episodes 90 to 102), "Mountain A Go Go 2" (マウンテン·ア·ゴーゴー·ツー, Maunten A Gō Gō Tsū) by Captain Straydum (used for episodes 103 to 115), "Hajimete Kimi to Shabetta" (はじめて君としゃべった; lit. The First Time I Spoke With You) by GaGaGa SP (used for episodes 116 to 128), and "Nakushita Kotoba" (失くした言葉; lit. Lost Words) by No Regret Life (used for episodes 129 to 131). The English version replaces the ending themes with an instrumental version of "Rise" by Jeremy Sweet and Ian Nickus.

== Episodes ==
| No. overall | No. in season | Title | Directed by | Written by | Animation directed by | Original release date | English air date |
|---|---|---|---|---|---|---|---|
Search for Tsunade
| 84 | 1 | "Roar, Chidori! Brother vs. Brother!"; Transliteration: "Unare Chidori - Hoero Sasuke!" (Japanese: 唸れ千鳥 吠えろサスケ！) | Directed by : Tsuyoshi Matsumoto; Storyboarded by : Junya Koshiba | Satoru Nishizono | Akira Matsushima | May 19, 2004 | April 21, 2007 |
In a flashback, Sasuke Uchiha reminisced the night his family was betrayed and killed by his brother Itachi. He is subjected to his Tsukuyomi and almost collapses from the experience. Back in the present day, Sasuke arrives in time to save Naruto Uzumaki and tries to kill Itachi, but he effortlessly stops him. Naruto attempts to summon a toad, but Kisame absorbs the chakra. Jiraiya arrives to block the attack.
| 85 | 2 | "Hate Among the Uchihas: The Last of the Clan!"; Transliteration: "Orokanaru Otōto yo - Urame, Nikume!" (Japanese: 愚かなる弟よ 恨め、憎め！) | Masahiko Murata | Akatsuki Yamatoya | Hiromi Okazaki | May 26, 2004 | April 28, 2007 |
Although Jiraiya prepares to fight the two Akatsuki members, Sasuke proclaims that he will kill Itachi. Itachi uses Tsukuyomi to overwhelm Sasuke unconscious. Jiraiya uses a toad flesh binding technique, forcing the Akatsuki team to flee. Might Guy arrives and takes Sasuke back home. Before leaving, Guy set out Naruto and Jiraiya to find Tsunade.
| 86 | 3 | "A New Training Begins: I Will Be Strong!"; Transliteration: "Shūgyō Kaishi - Ore wa Zettē Tsuyoku-naru!" (Japanese: 修業開始 オレはぜってー強くなる！) | Toshiya Niidome | Kou Hei Mushi | Masaru Hyodo | June 2, 2004 | May 5, 2007 |
Jiraiya tells Naruto about Tsunade and how she is known by the nickname "Legendary Loser" because she is poor in gambling. At the same time, Tsunade decides to partake in gambling at Machijūtoba, a casino where the big bets are made. Tsunade spends the money, exciting the head gambler as he is aware of her reputation. Naruto enjoys a day out on the town while Jiraiya investigates there for Tsunade. When Jiraiya ends up using his time - and Naruto's money - to enjoy sake and women, he starts teaching Naruto the Rasengan: the Spiral Chakra Sphere after a conflict with ex-Chunin Ninjas. To begin learning the technique, Naruto must pop a water-filled balloon held in the palm of his hand by spinning the water with his chakra, something he starts with great enthusiasm.
| 87 | 4 | "Keep on Training: Pop Goes the Water Balloon!"; Transliteration: "Konjō!!! Warero Mizufūsen!" (Japanese: 根性!!! 割れろ水風船！) | Directed by : Hiroshi Kimura; Storyboarded by : Ryō Yasumura | Michiko Yokote | Masafumi Yamamoto | June 9, 2004 | May 12, 2007 |
Soon after his training begins, Naruto finds himself distracted. After asking Jiraiya for tips, Naruto decides he will hard master the jutsu in three days. Jiraiya doubts the likelihood that Naruto will live up this promise, explaining that the Rasengan was developed by the Fourth Hokage in a duration of three years. He then goes on to explain that popping the balloon is only one of three steps, and leaves Naruto to resume his training. Naruto soon discovers that popping the balloon is easier if he uses both of his hands after observing a cat, and progresses to the second step.
| 88 | 5 | "Focal Point: The Mark of the Leaf"; Transliteration: "Konoha Māku to Hitaiate" (Japanese: 木ノ葉マークと額当て) | Directed by : Rion Kujo; Storyboarded by : Hayauma Ippaku | Satoru Nishizono | Yukimaro Ōtsubo | June 16, 2004 | May 19, 2007 |
The second step involves Naruto popping a rubber ball, something that will require much more power. After Naruto struggles with this step, Jiraiya helps him by drawing a leaf on his palm to give him a point to concentrate his efforts on. With some additional practice, Naruto manages to complete this stage as well. Elsewhere, Tsunade, an avid and extremely unlucky gambler, hits a winning streak, leading her to believe something bad is about to happen. She is correct, as when she tries to leave the city, she is met by Orochimaru and Kabuto Yakushi.
| 89 | 6 | "An Impossible Choice: The Pain Within Tsunade's Heart"; Transliteration: "Hamon" (Japanese: 波紋) | Directed by : Masaaki Kumagai; Storyboarded by : Tetsurō Amino | Akatsuki Yamatoya | Yasuhiko Kanezuka | June 23, 2004 | May 26, 2007 |
Naruto is tasked with combining the spinning and the power developed in the previous steps, something that Jiraiya cannot help him with. As he attempts to do both, a frail and sickly Orochimaru asks his former teammate Tsunade to heal his soulless decayed arms as the effects of the Reaper Death Seal inflicted on him are causing him excruciating pain. Although she has no intentions of helping Orochimaru due to his killing their teacher, Tsunade decides to consider the matter when he offers to revive her dead younger brother, Nawaki, and her lover, Dan.
| 90 | 7 | "Unforgivable! A Total Lack of Respect!"; Transliteration: "Ikari Bakuhatsu! Yurusanēttebayo" (Japanese: 怒りバクハツ！許さねーってばよ) | Directed by : Tsuyoshi Matsumoto; Storyboarded by : Shinji Satō | Akatsuki Yamatoya | Akira Matsushima | July 7, 2004 | June 9, 2007 |
Orochimaru gives Tsunade a week to think about it, and he leaves. While Tsunade has dinner that night, Jiraiya and Naruto arrive at the same bar. Suspicious of Jiraiya's reason for looking for her, Tsunade asks what he wants, to which he replies that Konoha wants her to be the new Hokage. She rejects the offer, saying anyone who would willingly take the title is a fool. Enraged that she would ignore the title of Hokage and those who have held the position, Naruto challenges Tsunade to a battle. They step outside, but Tsunade quickly proves to be far out of Naruto's league. Refusing to give up, Naruto readies his imperfect Rasengan for an attack.
| 91 | 8 | "Inheritance! The Necklace of Death!"; Transliteration: "Shodai Hokage no Isan - Shi o Yobu Kubikazari" (Japanese: 初代火影の遺産 死を呼ぶ首飾り) | Directed by : Mitsutaka Noshitani; Storyboarded by : Junya Koshiba | Kou Hei Mushi | Hideyuki Yoshida | July 14, 2004 | June 16, 2007 |
Recognizing the danger the attack imposes, Tsunade forces it into the ground, where the minor damage it inflicts indicates that it is not yet complete. Despite this, Tsunade offers Naruto a proposition: if he can master the technique in one week, she will give him her necklace, something worth an immense amount of money. If he cannot, she gets all the money in his wallet. Naruto agrees to the bet, and leaves to start training. Tsunade meets Jiraiya for drinks, where he tells her that he is aware Orochimaru has offered her something. Jiraiya makes it clear that he will kill her if she helps Orochimaru. Meanwhile, Naruto continues to learn the Rasengan, determined to win the bet over Tsunade.
| 92 | 9 | "A Dubious Offer! Tsunade's Choice!"; Transliteration: "Iessu ka Nō ka! Tsunade no Kaitō" (Japanese: YES(イェス)かNO(ノー)か！ツナデの回答) | Masahiko Murata | Michiko Yokote | Chikara Sakurai | July 21, 2004 | June 23, 2007 |
As the week goes by, Naruto continues his training, though he cannot mix spinning and power and has varying results. Tsunade watches Naruto's progress from the background, noting how similar he is to both Nawaki and Dan. Once a week goes by, Naruto appears to have been unsuccessful in mastering the Rasengan and lays unconscious with fatigue. Jiraiya, still uncertain about the situation with Orochimaru and Tsunade, decides to take her out for drinks and reminds her about the bet with Naruto. While they are out together, Tsunade drugs his drink, putting him to sleep. The next day, Tsunade meets up with Orochimaru, and prepares to heal his arms. However, Kabuto intervenes.
| 93 | 10 | "Breakdown! The Deal Is Off!"; Transliteration: "Kōshō Ketsuretsu!!" (Japanese: 交渉決裂!!) | Toshiya Niidome | Satoru Nishizono | Masaru Hyodo | July 28, 2004 | June 30, 2007 |
Having recognized that Tsunade's healing jutsu was filled with killing intent, Kabuto realized that she had no intention of helping Orochimaru. With Tsunade being the only person who can heal Orochimaru, Kabuto decides to force her to help as they begin to fight. Although Tsunade has far more battle experience than Kabuto, he is able to hold his own against her, even managing to land a few debilitating attacks. As Kabuto prepares to put Tsunade out of commission, Naruto, Jiraiya, and Tsunade's assistant, Shizune, arrive to help. Uninterested in their assistance, Tsunade tries to resume her battle with Kabuto until he learns of her Hemophobia and uses it against her. As she is taken aside to recover, Naruto and Shizune both launch attacks at Kabuto, which he defeats. Jiraiya states that he and Shizune must team up to stop Orochimaru and Kabuto.
| 94 | 11 | "Attack! Fury of the Rasengan!"; Transliteration: "Kurae! Ikari no Rasengan" (Japanese: くらえ！怒りの螺旋丸) | Directed by : Yuki Hayashi; Storyboarded by : Hayauma Ippaku | Akatsuki Yamatoya | Yasuhiko Kanezuka | August 4, 2004 | July 7, 2007 |
With Tsunade out of commission due to her paralyzing fear of blood, Jiraiya takes on the challenge of defeating Orochimaru. The enraged Naruto defends Kabuto from Tsunade, but gets overwhelmed. Kabuto picks on Naruto and brings back Tsunade's memories of Nawaki, Dan, and the bet made between her and Naruto. Naruto makes a unique method using a shadow clone to help divide the roles of rotating the chakra and pulls together all the strength he has left to make one final attack with his right hand, creating a shadow clone and pulling off a complete Rasengan and manages to defeat Kabuto.
| 95 | 12 | "The Fifth Hokage! A Life on the Line!"; Transliteration: "Godaime Hokage - Inochi o Kaketa Tatakai!" (Japanese: 五代目火影 命を賭けた闘い！) | Directed by : Yoshinori Odaka; Storyboarded by : Ryō Yasumura | Katsuyuki Sumisawa | Masafumi Yamamoto | August 11, 2004 | July 7, 2007 |
Having defeated Kabuto, Naruto passes down out mastering the new powerful jutsu, Despite using a powerful healing technique, Kabuto's wounds are too extensive for him to deal with. When Naruto collapses due to the severity of Kabuto's last attack, a strike to Naruto's heart, Tsunade does what she can, determined to save him and his dream of becoming Hokage. Her efforts work, and he regains consciousness long enough to claim the necklace he has won in the bet. Orochimaru, recognizing Naruto as a future potential threat, tries to kill him. Tsunade, determined to make sure Naruto becomes Hokage, overcomes her fear of blood and uses herself as a human shield to block the attack. When asked why she would risk her life to save him, Tsunade replies that it is her duty as the Fifth Hokage, finally accepting the role she was offered. Intending to eliminate his former teammates, Orochimaru summons Manda while Tsunade and Jiraiya summon Katsuyu and Gamabunta respectively.
| 96 | 13 | "Deadlock! Sannin Showdown!"; Transliteration: "Sansukumi no Tatakai" (Japanese: 三すくみの戦い) | Directed by : Tsuyoshi Matsumoto; Storyboarded by : Toshiya Niidome | Katsuyuki Sumisawa | Akira Matsushima | August 11, 2004 | July 14, 2007 |
Katsuyu and Gamabunta double-team Manda, though the latter is able to hold his own. Using her inhuman strength, Tsunade pins Manda down and delivers a finishing blow to Orochimaru. Deciding to use his last resort to regain the use of his arms, Orochimaru and Kabuto flee, leaving Tsunade, Jiraiya, Shizune, and an unconscious Naruto to their own devices. Once Naruto recovers and learns of Tsunade's acceptance of the Hokage title, he remarks that she is an undeserving of the job because the Third Hokage Hiruzen Sarutobi was better in every possible way. The two step outside to have another fight, though this time Tsunade gives Naruto a kiss on the forehead instead of a blow to the face, causing Naruto to blush as the group return home to Konoha.
| 97 | 14 | "Kidnapped! Naruto's Hot Spring Adventure!"; Transliteration: "Naruto no Yukemuri Chin Dōchū" (Japanese: ナルトの湯けむり珍道中) | Directed by : Masaaki Kumagai; Storyboarded by : Junya Koshiba | Satoru Nishizono | Yukiko Ban | August 18, 2004 | July 21, 2007 |
On their way back home, the group takes a break at a hot spring town. Naruto learns that two ninja of the Akagi family cannot return home unless they collect Tsunade's debts, and attempts to help them. Shizune, fearing that Tsunade's debts, if exposed, would jeopardize her chances of becoming Hokage, disguises herself as Tsunade to stop Naruto, but neither of them realizes that the debt had already been paid.
| 98 | 15 | "Tsunade's Warning: No More Ninja!"; Transliteration: "Ninja o Yamero! Tsunade no Tsūkoku" (Japanese: 忍者を辞めろ！ツナデの通告) | Shinji Satō | Michiko Yokote | Hiromi Okazaki | August 25, 2004 | July 28, 2007 |
Upon arriving in Konoha, preparations are made to formally put Tsunade into office, though she is largely uninterested in formalities and leaves the task to her new assistants. She makes her rounds in the hospital, healing Kakashi Hatake and Sasuke from Itachi's Tsukuyomi. When examining the wounds to Rock Lee's body, Tsunade discovers that the damage to his spine is too extensive, even for her, to heal with certainty. She advises Lee to give up on his dreams of being a ninja, citing that there is only a 50% chance that he will survive the operation.
| 99 | 16 | "The Will of Fire Still Burns!"; Transliteration: "Hi no Ishi o Tsugu Mono" (Japanese: 火の意志を継ぐもの) | Directed by : Mitsutaka Noshitani; Storyboarded by : Toshiya Niidome | Michiko Yokote | Hideyuki Yoshida | September 1, 2004 | August 4, 2007 |
Refusing to let Tsunade surpass his late grandfather, Konohamaru does everything in his power to prevent her inauguration. As Tsunade does research, hoping to increase the chances of Lee's surviving the operation, Naruto tries to convince Konohamaru that she will be a good Hokage. After Tsunade demonstrates her strength and healing abilities, Konohamaru decides Tsunade can be Hokage and that his grandfather remembered him.
| 100 | 17 | "Sensei and Student: The Bond of the Shinobi"; Transliteration: "Nekketsu Shitei no Kizuna: Otoko ga Nindō wo Tsuranuku Toki" (Japanese: 熱血師弟の絆～男が忍道を貫くとき～) | Directed by : Rion Kujo; Storyboarded by : Toshiya Niidome | Michiko Yokote | Yukimaro Ōtsubo | September 8, 2004 | August 19, 2007 |
Guy and Lee discuss the operation and Lee expresses his fears of dying as well as his fears of never being a ninja. The two reminisce about their time together and Guy finally decides that if Lee dies during the operation, so will he as he cannot live if Lee is not a ninja. Guy's words inspire Lee and he decides to take the operation as a promise. Tsunade, meanwhile, manages to increase the odds of Lee's survival to 58% and is satisfied that Lee will most likely survive the operation. Tsunade is inaugurated as the Fifth Hokage and the role of the village's protector is passed on to her.
Standalone side story
| 101 | 18 | "Gotta See! Gotta Know! Kakashi-sensei's True Face!"; Transliteration: "Mitai, Shiritai, Tashikametai - Kakashi-sensei no Sugao" (Japanese: 見たい、知りたい、確かめたい カカシ先生の素顔) | Masahiko Murata | Akatsuki Yamatoya | Chikara Sakurai | September 15, 2004 | August 25, 2007 |
In this episode based on a special omake, Naruto convinces Sasuke and Sakura Haruno to help him see what Kakashi's true face looks like under his mask. Each one of their plans, such as buying him ramen to force him to remove his mask while he eats, fails in a comedic fashion. At the same time, they inadvertently and unknowingly thwart attempts by three ninja to kill Kakashi for goofy reasons. Finally, Kakashi agrees to remove his mask and reveals another slightly paler mask beneath it, much to Naruto, Sasuke and Sakura shocks.
Land of Tea Escort
| 102 | 19 | "Mission: Help an Old Friend in the Land of Tea"; Transliteration: "Iza Shin Ninmu - Giri to Ninjō to Cha-kuni o Sukue!" (Japanese: いざ新任務 義理と人情と茶國を救え！) | Directed by : Tsuyoshi Matsumoto; Storyboarded by : Toshiya Niidome | Akatsuki Yamatoya & Katsuyuki Sumisawa | Akira Matsushima | September 22, 2004 | September 1, 2007 |
Team 7 without Kakashi is given a mission to protect a young man, Idate, during his foot race against a rival clan that will settle the feud between the two. However, Idate has a strong distaste for ninja. At the start of the race, he heads to the wrong direction, confusing everyone.
| 103 | 20 | "The Race Is On! Trouble on the High Seas!"; Transliteration: "Naruto Gekichin!? Inbau Uzumaku Ōunabara" (Japanese: ナルト撃沈!? 陰謀うずまく大海原) | Directed by : Yoshinori Odaka; Storyboarded by : Ryō Yasumura | Michiko Yokote, Satoru Nishizono & Katsuyuki Sumisawa | Masafumi Yamamoto | September 29, 2004 | September 15, 2007 |
Team 7 follows Idate to another port, which makes for a better starting point of the boating part of the race, due to the winds and the current. En route, they are attacked by the Rain ninja from the Chunin exam, who have been hired by the other clan. Team 7 defends Idate and tell him to swim for the shore, while they follow later. He does so, but is confronted by Aoi, an Amegakure Rouge Ninja.
| 104 | 21 | "Run Idate Run! Nagi Island Awaits!"; Transliteration: "Hashire Idate! Arashi o Yubi Haran no Nagitō!!" (Japanese: 走れイダテ！嵐を呼ぶ波乱のナギ島!!) | Yuki Hayashi | Katsuyuki Sumisawa, Akatsuki Yamatoya & Kou Hei Mushi | Seiko Asai & Yasuhiko Kanezuka | October 13, 2004 | September 22, 2007 |
Aoi taunts Idate and attacks him. Team 7, who are still swimming for the island, are attacked underwater by the Rain Ninja. Using the first step of training for the Rasengan, Naruto creates a huge whirlpool that saves them. They then try to rescue Idate, but prove to be no match for Aoi, who poisons them and leaves. Sakura gives them all medicine Tsunade had given her, and they seek shelter in a cave. Idate explains that he was once a Leaf Ninja, but was tricked by Aoi into betraying the village after failing the exam.
| 105 | 22 | "A Fierce Battle of Rolling Thunder!"; Transliteration: "Gōru Chokuzen! Raimei Todoroku Daigekitō" (Japanese: ゴール直前！雷鳴とどろく大激闘) | Masaaki Kumagai | Akatsuki Yamatoya, Satoru Nishizono & Katsuyuki Sumisawa | Yasuhiko Kanezuka & Hiromi Okazaki | October 20, 2004 | September 29, 2007 |
Fukusuke continues to celebrate with women and food when Aoi warns him that he might be celebrating prematurely. Naruto, carrying Idate, ascends the long flight of stairs to the Modoroki Shrine. Idate grabs the orb and heads out on his own two feet, but they are soon confronted by Aoi, waiting with Tobirama's Sword of Raijin that he had Idate steal for him. Both Naruto's Rasengan and Sasuke's Chidori are repelled by the sword, though the latter manages to damage it.
| 106 | 23 | "The Last Leg: A Final Act of Desperation"; Transliteration: "Todoku ka Idate! Shūnen no Rasuto Supāto!!" (Japanese: 届くかイダテ！執念のラストスパート) | Directed by : Mitsutaka Noshitani; Storyboarded by : Hayauma Ippaku | Katsuyuki Sumisawa | Hideyuki Yoshida | October 27, 2004 | October 6, 2007 |
When Sasuke Uchiha and Sakura Haruno are defeated, Naruto breaks the Sword of Rajin and defeats Aoi, so Idate can finish the race. Though Fukusuke is already near the finish line, with determination and encouragement from Naruto, Idate catches up against Fukusuke and win the race, saving the Wasabi Clan. As Team 7 returns to the Leaf Village, the enraged Sasuke learns that Naruto has defeated Aoi alone.
Sasuke Retrieval
| 107 | 24 | "The Battle Begins: Naruto vs. Sasuke"; Transliteration: "Omae to Tatakaitai! Tsui ni Gekitotsu, Sasuke tai Naruto" (Japanese: オマエと戦いたい！ついに激突、サスケVS(たい)ナルト) | Toshiya Niidome | Katsuyuki Sumisawa | Masaru Hyodo | November 3, 2004 | October 13, 2007 |
Shikamaru is officially promoted to Chunin and Lee accepts undergoing the operation. To prove his hatred, Sasuke fights Naruto at the hospital rooftop, exchanging several attacks between the Rasengan and Chidori, with Sakura watching them.
| 108 | 25 | "Bitter Rivals and Broken Bonds"; Transliteration: "Mienai Kiretsu" (Japanese: 見えない亀裂) | Directed by : Tsuyoshi Matsumoto; Storyboarded by : Hayauma Ippaku | Akatsuki Yamatoya | Akira Matsushima | November 10, 2004 | October 20, 2007 |
As Sakura approaches Naruto and Sasuke, Kakashi Hatake appears and deflects them into two water towers. Sasuke finds one of them with a large hole, and only comes to envy his strength more upon seeing the other one. Kakashi lectures Sasuke about having a normal life at the village. Before leaving, Kakashi warns Sasuke not to get revenge on everyone. Meanwhile, Sakura asks Naruto on a date that she had denied a long time ago, when they were first assigned to Team 7, and mentioning about Orochimaru's encounter in the Death Forest and Sasuke's Cursed Seal. While Sasuke debates on whether to stay with the village or having revenge, the Sound Four arrive and attack him.
| 109 | 26 | "An Invitation from the Sound"; Transliteration: "Oto no Izanai" (Japanese: 音の誘い) | Shinji Satō | Michiko Yokote | Yukiko Ban | November 17, 2004 | October 20, 2007 |
Sasuke continues his battle with the Sound Four, but eventually becomes too injured, including being weakened by using the Cursed Seal. The Sound Four tell the story of how Sasuke can become stronger if he would lend his power to Orochimaru. Before leaving the Leaf Village, Sasuke knocks Sakura unconscious when she admits with him.
| 110 | 27 | "Formation! The Sasuke Retrieval Squad"; Transliteration: "Kessei! Teppeki Fōmēshon" (Japanese: 結成！鉄壁のフォーメーション) | Masahiko Murata | Kou Hei Mushi | Chikara Sakurai | November 24, 2004 | October 27, 2007 |
Sakura awakens and informs Tsunade about Sasuke's betrayal. Tsunade orders Shikamaru Nara to assemble a team of genin under his lead to go after Sasuke, including Naruto Uzumaki, Neji Hyuga, Choji Akimichi, and Kiba Inuzuka. They devise the optimal formation for the group into the Sasuke Retrival Squad. Before they leave, Sakura pleads in tears to Naruto to make sure to bring Sasuke back. Naruto promises to do so, and the group sets out.
| 111 | 28 | "Sound vs. Leaf"; Transliteration: "Sesshoku: Oto Yoninshū no Jitsuryoku" (Japanese: 接触～音四人衆の実力～) | Directed by : Yoshinori Odaka; Storyboarded by : Ryō Yasumura | Kou Hei Mushi | Masafumi Yamamoto | November 24, 2004 | October 27, 2007 |
As the first step in gaining power, Sasuke's Cursed Seal of Heaven must be advanced to its Second State. For this to happen, the Sound Four seals Sasuke into a barrel and carry him from Konoha as his seal advances. They are confronted by two nearby Konoha ninja, Raido Namiashi and Genma Shiranui, but eventually defeat them thanks to their Cursed Seals. After carrying Sasuke for a ways, the Sound Four takes a break, giving the recently caught up retrieval team a chance to try a sneak attack. Their presence is detected, and the Sound Four attacks them before they can make a move.
| 112 | 29 | "Squad Mutiny: Everything Falls Apart!"; Transliteration: "Ikinari Nakamaware!? Shikamaru Shōtai Daipinchi" (Japanese: イキナリ仲間割れ!? シカマル小隊大ピンチ) | Yuki Hayashi | Akatsuki Yamatoya | Yasuhiko Kanezuka | December 1, 2004 | November 3, 2007 |
Although the Sound Four's attack seems to force the retrieval team on the defensive, Shikamaru intended to be caught and uses the opportunity to capture the Sound Four with his shadow. They manage to escape, and Jirobo captures the retrieval team in a dome of rocks. As the other Sound Four members go on ahead, Jirobo absorbs the Konoha ninja's chakra. Before their chakra is completely absorbed, Choji destroys the dome to free himself and the team.
| 113 | 30 | "Full Throttle Power! Chōji, Ablaze!"; Transliteration: "Pawā Zenkai! Moero Chōji" (Japanese: パワー全開！燃えろチョウジ) | Directed by : Akira Shimizu; Storyboarded by : Toshiya Niidome | Satoru Nishizono | Hideyuki Yoshida | December 8, 2004 | November 3, 2007 |
The rest of the team members leave Choji to fight Jirobo. Choji eats the first of the Akimichi's Three Colored Pills, increasing his strength. Doing so proves enough to overpower Jirobo, forcing him to advance his Cursed Seal to its First State. With Jirobo having the upper hand, Choji eats the second pill.
| 114 | 31 | "Good-bye Old Friend...! I'll Always Believe in You!"; Transliteration: "Saraba Tomo yo...! Soredemo Ore wa Shinjiteru" (Japanese: さらば友よ…！それでもオレは信じてる) | Directed by : Masaaki Kumagai; Storyboarded by : Toshiya Niidome | Satoru Nishizono | Hiromi Okazaki | December 15, 2004 | November 10, 2007 |
With the second pill in his system, Choji uses the Multi-Size Technique to increase his size and fall upon Jirobo. To escape the crushing effects of Choji's increased bulk, Jirobo advances to Second State of his Cursed Seal, enabling him to lift Choji and toss him aside. Outmatched, Choji considers taking the last pill. While using them, he has taken thus far have been harmful to him, the third almost guarantees death to the user. Thinking about Shikamaru, Choji takes the pill, awakens his butterfly form, and defeats Jirobo, before falling unconscious.
| 115 | 32 | "Your Opponent Is Me!"; Transliteration: "Omae no Aite wa Kono Ore da!" (Japanese: お前の相手はこのオレだ！) | Directed by : Tsuyoshi Matsumoto; Storyboarded by : Hayauma Ippaku | Michiko Yokote | Hideki Hashimoto | December 22, 2004 | November 10, 2007 |
When the retrieval team catches up with the Sound Four, they are quickly caught in Kidomaru's webs. As Kidomaru is about to finish off Naruto, Neji frees himself from the webbings and saves the rest of the team. Because Neji's Gentle Fist style can break Kidomaru's chakra-infused webbing, the others leave Neji to fight Kidomaru. Kidomaru finds out how Neji can cut his webbings. Although Kidomaru soon believes himself to have the advantage, Neji readies his Eight Trigrams Sixty-Four Palms to prove him wrong.
| 116 | 33 | "360 Degrees of Vision: The Byakugan's Blind Spot"; Transliteration: "Shikai Sanbyaku-Rokujū Do - Byakugan no Shikaku" (Japanese: 視界360(さんびゃくろくじゅう)度 白眼の死角) | Shinji Satō | Kou Hei Mushi | Yukiko Ban | January 5, 2005 | November 24, 2007 |
Kidomaru manages to shield himself from the attack, and flees to the safety of the neighboring trees. Deciding to attack Neji from a distance, Kidomaru advances his Cursed Seal to its First State and sends multiple spiders to attack Neji. Neji repels them all, though Kidomaru notices a delayed reaction in some of Neji's blocks. He theorizes that Neji's defenses has a blind spot, and attacks him further from this blind spot. His theory is proven correct though Neji cannot block the attack. Believing himself to have found Neji's weakness, Kidomaru prepares to kill him.
| 117 | 34 | "Losing Is Not an Option!"; Transliteration: "Makerare-nai Riyū" (Japanese: 負けられない理由) | Toshiya Niidome | Akatsuki Yamatoya | Masaru Hyodo | January 5, 2005 | November 24, 2007 |
After advancing his Cursed Seal to its Second State and creating a bow and arrow with his webs, Kidomaru begins taking shots at Neji's blind spot. Neji blocks the attacks enough to keep them from hitting vital areas, though is still left heavily damaged with each of Kidomaru's attacks. Ready to finish the battle, Kidomaru prepares his most deadly arrow for use, and fires it at Neji. Neji takes the arrow full force, though already knowing of his blind spot moves at the last second to keep the arrow from piercing his heart. With Kidomaru's arrow connected to him by a web, Neji sends his chakra into the web, paralyzing Kidomaru. After defeating him, Neji falls unconscious, before Naruto and his friends continue the pursuit.
| 118 | 35 | "The Vessel Arrives Too Late"; Transliteration: "Dakkan - Ma ni Awanakatta Utsuwa" (Japanese: 奪還～間に合わなかった器) | Directed by : Yuki Hayashi; Storyboarded by : Ryō Yasumura | Katsuyuki Sumisawa | Yasuhiko Kanezuka | January 12, 2005 | December 1, 2007 |
Orochimaru, his body left useless after his failed invasion of Konoha, anxiously waits for Sasuke so that he can switch to Sasuke's body. Although he puts it off for as long as he can, hoping that the Sound Four will arrive in time, his body brings him too much pain and he is forced to switch to the body of one of his prisoners. Elsewhere, the retrieval team catches up with the Sound Four and tries to get Sasuke back.
| 119 | 36 | "Miscalculation: A New Enemy Appears!"; Transliteration: "Shissaku! Arata-naru Teki" (Japanese: 失策！新たなる敵) | Directed by : Akira Shimizu; Storyboarded by : Hayauma Ippaku | Katsuyuki Sumisawa | Hideyuki Yoshida | January 19, 2005 | December 1, 2007 |
Soon after the battle begins, Kiba and his dog, Akamaru, fall off a cliff with Sakon. Shikamaru engages Tayuya while Naruto goes after Kimimaro, who is carrying Sasuke's coffin. Desperate to get Sasuke back, Naruto begins tapping into the Nine-Tails's chakra to engage Kimimaro. As Shikamaru begins fighting Tayuya, she summons three creatures to help her in combat. With Kiba and Sakon's battle already underway elsewhere, Sakon's brother, Ukon reveals himself to help Sakon fight.
| 120 | 37 | "Roar and Howl! The Ultimate Tag-Team!"; Transliteration: "Unare! Hoero! Kyūkyoku no Taggu" (Japanese: 唸れ！吼えろ！究極のタッグ) | Masahiko Murata | Katsuyuki Sumisawa | Chikara Sakurai | February 2, 2005 | December 8, 2007 |
As Tayuya guides her three beasts after Shikamaru, she activates the First State of her Cursed Seal to make controlling them easier. Naruto begins his battle, creating a great deal of shadow clones with which to attack Kimimaro, though Kimimaro defeats one of them. As the fight between Kiba, Akamaru, Sakon, and Ukon rages on, Ukon pushes his Cursed Seal into its Second State. Recognizing the huge increase in strength that this allows the brothers, Kiba and Akamaru combine to become a giant double-headed wolf. The combined beast charges towards Sakon and Ukon, though the brothers block the attack. As the wolf transformation disperses, Akamaru is attacked and left heavily injured, and Ukon merges himself with Kiba's body. Needing to get rid of Ukon and save Akamaru, Kiba wounds his stomach, causing him and Ukon to lose blood.
| 121 | 38 | "To Each His Own Battle"; Transliteration: "Sorezore no Tatakai" (Japanese: それぞれの闘い) | Directed by : Tsuyoshi Matsumoto; Storyboarded by : Hayauma Ippaku | Akatsuki Yamatoya | Hideki Hashimoto | February 9, 2005 | December 8, 2007 |
Ukon separates from Kiba and rejoins with Sakon so that he can recover. Kiba finds Akamaru, and the two flee down river, hoping to escape the brothers. Meanwhile, Naruto is unable to make a dent in Kimimaro, and his shadow clones are still rapidly defeated before they can land a blow. Elsewhere, Shikamaru believes to have picked up on the movements of Tayuya's creatures, though she quickly has them switch actions before Shikamaru can act.
| 122 | 39 | "Fakeout: Shikamaru's Comeback!"; Transliteration: "Feiku! Otoko Shikamaru - Kishikaisei no Kake" (Japanese: フェイク！男シカマル 起死回生の賭け) | Directed by : Akira Shimizu; Storyboarded by : Hitoyuki Matsui | Michiko Yokote | Hiromi Okazaki | February 16, 2005 | December 15, 2007 |
Despite Tayuya's efforts, Shikamaru has devised a plan to defeat the creatures. Using a flash bang to lengthen the shadows in the area, Shikamaru captures them and prepares to turn them against Tayuya. To prevent this, Tayuya calls off the creatures, making them disperse. Despite this, Tayuya is captured by Shikamaru's shadow, forcing her to advance her Cursed Seal to its Second State to escape. With Tayuya now strong enough to overpower his shadow, Shikamaru decides instead to use his shadow for attack and attempts to use his shadow to strangle her.
| 123 | 40 | "The Leaf's Handsome Devil!"; Transliteration: "Konoha no Aoki Yajū Kenzan!" (Japanese: 木ノ葉の碧き野獣 見参！) | Masaaki Kumagai | Kou Hei Mushi | Yasuhiko Kanezuka | February 23, 2005 | December 15, 2007 |
As Naruto gets enraged with the lack of progress, Sasuke's Cursed Seal finally reaches the Second State and he breaks free from the coffin. Kimimaro tries to kill Naruto, but the recovered Lee arrives in time to save Naruto and have him follow Sasuke. Before fighting, it is revealed that Lee took a bottle of sake instead of medicine, and left the village without permission in order to help his friends. Lee gets intoxicated and evades Kimimaro in a drunken frenzy.
| 124 | 41 | "The Beast Within"; Transliteration: "Yajū Sakuretsu! Hajikero Futtobe Tsukinukero!" (Japanese: 野獣炸裂！弾けろ吹っ飛べ突き抜けろ！) | Directed by : Shinji Satō; Storyboarded by : Toshiya Niidome | Satoru Nishizono | Yukiko Ban | March 2, 2005 | December 22, 2007 |
In his drunken form, Lee's movements are unpredictable and Kimimaro is left unable to dodge his attacks. As Lee begins gaining the advantage in the fight, Kimimaro is forced to activate his Cursed Seal of Earth. However, Lee begins to sober up, and reverts to his previous state, easily being outclassed by Kimimaro. Kimimaro prepares to finish Lee off, Tayuya starts fighting Shikamaru's shadow, and Sakon and Ukon find Kiba and Akamaru. Before the Sound Four members can kill the leaf ninjas, Gaara, Kankuro, and Temari, arrive separately at each battle sites for help.
| 125 | 42 | "The Sand Shinobi: Allies of the Leaf"; Transliteration: "Konoha Dōmei-kuni - Suna no Shinobi" (Japanese: 木ノ葉同盟国 砂の忍) | Directed by : Yuki Hayashi; Storyboarded by : Hitoyuki Matsui | Akatsuki Yamatoya | Hideyuki Yoshida | March 9, 2005 | December 22, 2007 |
The arrival of the Sand ninja surprises the Konoha retrieval team and the Sound Four. Although the ninjas ask their saviours to flee, each refuses, having been asked to come to help by Tsunade. Kiba's nose saves Kankuro from a sneak attack. Ukon underestimates Kankuro and his puppet receding from their Cursed Seal, but Kankuro traps Ukon and Sakon in a second of his puppets, and kills them. Tayuya attempts to escape from the surrounding trees for cover, but Temari defeats her and destroys the top branches of the forest.
| 126 | 43 | "Showdown: Gaara vs. Kimimaro!"; Transliteration: "Saikyō Taiketsu! Gaara tai Kimimaro!!" (Japanese: 最強対決！我愛羅VS(たい)君麻呂!!) | Toshiya Niidome | Katsuyuki Sumisawa | Masaru Hyodo | March 16, 2005 | December 29, 2007 |
Lee, wanting to assist Gaara in his fight, attacks Kimimaro, but his body's too weak and Gaara tells him he is only getting in the way. Gaara attacks him with his sand burial technique, but Kimimaro survives by hardening a layer of bone under his skin thanks to the First State of his Cursed Seal. Kimimaro remembers how he grew up in a cage because of his kekkei genkai, and the battle that killed all of his clan. It was Orochimaru who took him in and gave him a purpose. Kimimaro advances his Cursed Seal to the Second State and continues to fight, much to Lee and Gaara's dismay. All the while Naruto continues his relentless search for Sasuke.
| 127 | 44 | "Vengeful Strike! The Bracken Dance!"; Transliteration: "Shūnen no Ichigeki! Sawarabi no Mai" (Japanese: 執念の一撃！早蕨の舞) | Shigenori Kageyama | Katsuyuki Sumisawa | Kwang Seok Yang | March 30, 2005 | December 29, 2007 |
Recognizing the potency of Gaara's attack and the strength of his defenses, Kimimaro hardens a bone around his arm into the shape of a drill. With this, his strongest weapon, Kimimaro charges at Gaara, though Gaara's final defense proves too much and it shatters. Calling upon the sand in the ground, Gaara pulls Kimimaro deep underground, confining him there until his eventual death. As Kimimaro sinks, he creates a forest of bones to burst from the ground, but Gaara and Lee avoid them at the last second. As the two sit, completely exhausted but relieved to have won, an furious Kimimaro appears from one of the bones with his bone drill for a final attack. His disease gets the best of him at the last second, and he dies before he can finish Gaara and Lee. Gaara reflects that like Lee and Naruto, Kimimaro had someone whom he cared for so much that every ill done to that person was done to him as well, someone he was willing to die for, and that even the companionship of an evil person can be preferable to loneliness. Elsewhere, Naruto finally reaches Sasuke.
| 128 | 45 | "A Cry on Deaf Ears"; Transliteration: "Todokanai Sakebi" (Japanese: 届かない叫び) | Tsuyoshi Matsumoto | Katsuyuki Sumisawa | Haruo Sotozaki | March 30, 2005 | January 5, 2008 |
The enraged Naruto asks Sasuke to return home to Konoha, but Sasuke does not listen to Naruto. Determined to bring Sasuke back to his senses, Naruto grabs hold of him and starts to punch him. He makes Sasuke spit out blood with every punch, and then Sasuke rallies and easily repels Naruto. Sasuke tells Naruto that he doesn't dream of the future, only the past, as he recalls his close bond with his older brother, Itachi Uchiha. Naruto tries using force again and attacks Sasuke but Sasuke dodges it and uses Dragon Flame Jutsu and sends it towards Naruto.
| 129 | 46 | "Brothers: Distance Among the Uchiha"; Transliteration: "Ani Itachi to Otōto Sasuke - Tōsugiru Sonzai" (Japanese: 兄(イタチ)と弟(サスケ) 遠すぎる存在) | Masahiko Murata | Katsuyuki Sumisawa | Chikara Sakurai & Seiko Asai | April 6, 2005 | January 5, 2008 |
Naruto manages to avoids the flames, and Sasuke remembers his childhood while doing battle with his rival. Itachi used to be a cheerful man and a good brother while being the ANBU captain. Fugaku Uchiha always favored Itachi best. Sasuke unsuccessfully tries to best Itachi, until Itachi begins to become more distant from the clan and starts to rebel against their family, specially his Sasuke.
| 130 | 47 | "Father and Son, the Broken Crest"; Transliteration: "Chichi to Ko - Hibiwa-reta Kamon" (Japanese: 父と子 ひび割れた家紋) | Directed by : Akira Shimizu; Storyboarded by : Toshiya Niidome | Katsuyuki Sumisawa | Hiromi Okazaki | April 13, 2005 | January 12, 2008 |
Sasuke and Naruto's fight progresses slowly as Sasuke continues to remember his childhood. In his memories, Sasuke learns the Fire Ball Jutsu, thus gaining his father's attention as Fugaku tells him not to follow his brother's footsteps. He then starts to wonder if he is only to replace his brother. His mother confirms everything else is okay, however. After doing this, he remembers heading to school and deciding that he will not lose to Itachi. In the present day, Naruto and Sasuke continue the fight.
| 131 | 48 | "The Secrets of the Mangekyō Sharingan"; Transliteration: "Kaigan - Mangekyō Sharingan no Himitsu" (Japanese: 開眼 万華鏡写輪眼の秘密) | Directed by : Masaaki Kumagai; Storyboarded by : Toshiya Niidome | Katsuyuki Sumisawa | Yasuhiko Kanezuka | April 20, 2005 | January 12, 2008 |
As Sasuke's remembrance of his childhood draws to a close, Sasuke returned home from the Academy one day to find all the members of the Uchiha clan killed. Upon finding his parents' bodies, Sasuke discovered Itachi to be responsible for the massacre. Using his Mangekyo Sharingan, Itachi showed Sasuke their parents's deaths, causing Sasuke to run with fright. Itachi stopped him, telling him that he was not worth killing. As Itachi left, he informed Sasuke that if he wanted to take revenge for the clan, he would need to get stronger. To help Sasuke gain the strongest ability of the Uchiha, the Mangekyo Sharingan. Itachi tells Sasuke the requirements to obtain his own Mangekyo Sharingan: He must kill his closest friend. With that, Itachi left the village, leaving Sasuke to build a hate for his brother. Resolving to get stronger, Sasuke decided he would do whatever was necessary to kill Itachi and self-proclaimes as Avenger. Back in the present day, Sasuke tells Naruto that he will kill him to break their friendship before beginning the fight.

== Home media release ==
=== English ===
==== DVD ====
Naruto Uncut (USA)
| Volume | Date | Discs | Episodes | Reference |
|---|---|---|---|---|
| 7 | May 6, 2008 | 3 | 79–92 | |
| 8 | June 10, 2008 | 3 | 93–106 | |
| 9 | August 12, 2008 | 3 | 107–120 | |
| 10 | October 14, 2008 | 3 | 121–135 | |

Naruto Season Box Set (USA)
| Box Set | Date | Discs | Episodes | Reference |
|---|---|---|---|---|
| Season 2, Vol. 2 | April 27, 2010 | 6 | 79–106 | |
| Season 3, Vol. 1 | June 29, 2010 | 6 | 107–135 | |

Naruto Unleashed (UK)
| Volume | Date | Box Set Release | Disc | Episodes | Reference |
|---|---|---|---|---|---|
| Series 4 Part 1 | August 25, 2008 | February 23, 2009 | 3 | 79–91 | |
| Series 4 Part 2 | October 20, 2008 | February 23, 2009 | 3 | 92–104 | |
| Series 5 Part 1 | December 15, 2008 | June 29, 2009 | 3 | 105–117 | |
| Series 5 Part 2 | February 23, 2009 | June 29, 2009 | 3 | 118–130 | |
| Series 6 Part 1 | April 20, 2009 | October 26, 2009 | 3 | 131–143 | |

Naruto Uncut (AUS / NZ)
| Collection | Episodes | DVD release date | Reference |
|---|---|---|---|
| 7 | 79–92 | November 12, 2008 | |
| 8 | 93–106 | December 3, 2008 | |
| 9 | 107–120 | January 14, 2009 | |
| 10 | 121–135 | February 18, 2009 | |

Naruto Origins (AUS / NZ)
| Collection | Episodes | DVD release date | Reference |
|---|---|---|---|
| 2 | 53–106 | | |
| 3 | 107–163 | | |

==== Blu-ray ====
Viz Media (Region 1/A)
| Set | Date | Discs | Episodes | References |
|---|---|---|---|---|
| 4 | August 24, 2021 | 4 | 83–110 | |
| 5 | October 19, 2021 | 4 | 111–137 | |
