= Bionix (TV programming block) =

Television programming block

- Network: YTV
- Launched: September 10, 2004; 22 years ago
- Closed: February 7, 2010; 16 years ago
- Country of origin: Canada
- Owner: Corus Entertainment
- Headquarters: Toronto, Ontario, Canada

Bionix was a late night action programming block that aired between September 10, 2004 and February 7, 2010, on the Canadian television channel YTV. The block primarily featured acquired Japanese anime series aimed at mature audience.

== Programming ==
This is a list of series and movies that have aired on Bionix, with their Canadian TV ratings.

=== Anime ===
- .hack//Sign (14+)
- Bleach (14+)
- Blue Dragon (C8)
- Case Closed (PG)
- Death Note (14+)
- Eureka Seven (14+)
- Fullmetal Alchemist (14+)
- Ghost in the Shell: Stand Alone Complex (14+)
- Inuyasha (14+)
- MÄR (C8)
- Mobile Suit Gundam SEED (14+)
- Mobile Suit Gundam SEED Destiny (14+)
- Naruto (PG)
- Witch Hunter Robin (14+)
- Zatch Bell! (C8)

==== Western Animation ====
- Avatar: The Last Airbender (C8)
- Beast Wars: Transformers (C8)
- Futurama (PG)
- Invader Zim (PG)
- Justice League Unlimited (C8)
- ReBoot (C8)
- Samurai Jack (C8)
- Shadow Raiders (C8)
- Storm Hawks (C8)

=== Live Action Series ===
- Dark Oracle (C8)
- Monster Warriors (C8)

=== Movies ===
==== 2005 ====
- Inuyasha the Movie: Affections Touching Across Time (14+) (aired March 25, 2005, and August 30, 2008)
- Inuyasha the Movie 2: The Castle Beyond the Looking Glass (14+) (aired August 26, 2005)

==== 2006 ====
- Ultimate Avengers: The Movie (G) (aired September 1, 2006, and April 25, 2008)
- Inuyasha the Movie 3: Swords of an Honorable Ruler (14+) (aired December 29, 2006)

==== 2007 ====
- Inuyasha the Movie 4: Fire on the Mystic Island (14+) (aired June 22, 2007, and August 17, 2007)
- Fullmetal Alchemist the Movie: Conqueror of Shamballa (14+) (aired October 19, 2007)
- Princess Mononoke (14+) (aired October 26, 2007)
- Naruto the Movie: Ninja Clash in the Land of Snow (PG) (aired November 16, 2007, and June 20, 2008)

==== 2008 ====
- Superman: Doomsday (PG) (aired March 7, 2008)
- Justice League: The New Frontier (PG) (aired October 4, 2008)
- Bleach: Memories of Nobody (14+) (aired November 8, 2008)
- He-Man & She-Ra: A Christmas Special (C8) (aired December 13, 2008)
