= Joe Inoue discography =

- Studio albums: 2
- Extended plays: 1
- Singles: 5
- Music videos: 8
- Digital Singles: 3

This is the discography of Japanese rock artist, Joe Inoue.

== Albums ==
=== Studio albums ===
| # | Information | Chart positions |
|---|---|---|
| 1st | Me! Me! Me!: Release date: April 8, 2009 | #86 |
| 2nd | Dos Angeles: Release date: October 6, 2010 | #136 |
| 3rd | JOEpop #1: Release date: November 17, 2016 | — |
| 4th | JOEpop #2: Release date: December 12, 2016 | — |
| 5th | Polyglot Musix #1: Release date: February 15, 2017 | — |

=== Extended plays ===
| # | Information | Chart positions |
|---|---|---|
| 1st | In a Way: Release date: September 19, 2007 | #220 |

== Singles ==
| # | Information | Chart positions |
|---|---|---|
| 1st | "Hello!": Released: July 16, 2008 | #189 |
| 2nd | "Closer": Released: December 17, 2008 | #22 |
| 3rd | "Maboroshi": Released: February 18, 2009 | #156 |
| 4th | "Go!": Released: July 22, 2009 | — |
| 5th | "Kaze no Gotoku": Released: August 4, 2010 | #33 |

=== Digital singles ===
| # | Information | Chart positions |
|---|---|---|
| 1st | "Very Big X'Mas": Release date: November 25, 2009 | — |
| 2nd | "Lights": Release date: April 21, 2010 | — |
| 3rd | "Closer (English Version)": Release date: May 19, 2010 | — |

== Music videos ==
| Album | Video | Link |
|---|---|---|
| In a Way | "Nowhere" | Video on YouTube |
| In a Way | "Hummingbird" | Video on YouTube |
| Me! Me! Me! | "Hello!" | Video on YouTube |
| Me! Me! Me! | "Closer" | Video on YouTube |
| Me! Me! Me! | "Maboroshi" | Video on YouTube |
| Dos Angeles | "Go!" | Video on YouTube |
| Dos Angeles | "Home" | Video on YouTube |
| Dos Angeles | "Kaze no Gotoku" | Video on YouTube |

== Appearances ==
=== Compilations ===
- White Out 4: Real Snowboarder's Compilation - December 9, 2007
  - Track 3: "Kakusei"
- Best Hit: Naruto - July 14, 2010
  - Track 5: "Closer"

=== Featured vocals ===
- RYUKYUDISKO's pleasure - September 23, 2009
  - Track 6: "OK Sampler"
- TETSUYA's Come On! - January 5, 2011
  - Track 5: "Eden"
- TOTALFAT's "World of Glory with Joe Inoue" - May 4, 2011
  - Track 1: "World of Glory with Joe Inoue"
  - Track 2: "Don't Cry!! with Joe Inoue"
- TOTALFAT's Damn Hero - May 25, 2011
  - Track 5: "World of Glory with Joe Inoue (Damn Hero Ver.)"
