= Naruto: Shippuden season 4 =

Naruto: Shippuden
- Season 4
- Season 4 Cover
- No. of episodes: 17

Release
- Original network: TV Tokyo
- Original release: August 21 – December 11, 2008

Season chronology
- ← Previous; Season 3 Next → Season 5

The fourth season of the Naruto: Shippuden anime series is directed by Hayato Date, and produced by Studio Pierrot and TV Tokyo. They are based on Part II for Masashi Kishimoto's manga series. The season follows Shikamaru Nara attempting to avenge Asuma Sarutobi's death by Akatsuki member Hidan while Naruto Uzumaki trains with Kakashi Hatake and Yamato to learn the Wind Chakra Nature. The fourth season aired from August to December 2008 on TV Tokyo. It was also released on four DVDs in Japan by Aniplex between January 14 and May 13, 2009. The season was referred to by these DVDs as the chapter of Immortal Devastators – Hidan and Kakuzu (不死の破壊者、飛段・角都, Fushi no Hakaisha Hidan Kakuzu).

The English dub aired on Disney XD between March 16 and July 23, 2011. The season ran on Adult Swim's Toonami programming block from June 28 to November 8, 2015.

Viz Media released the season in two DVD boxes on April 26 and July 12, 2011. Manga Entertainment collected it in two DVD boxes with the first one released on July 11 and the second set on November 7, 2011.

The opening themes for this season were "Blue Bird" (ブルーバード; Burūbādo) by Ikimono-gakari (used for episodes 72 to 77) and "Closer" by Joe Inoue (used for episodes 78 to 88). The ending themes were "Broken Youth" by NICO Touches the Walls (used for episodes 72 to 77) and "Long Kiss Good Bye" by Halcali (used for episodes 78 to 88). The broadcast version for episode 72 and 73 uses "Blue Bird" (ブルーバード, Burūbādo) by Ikimono-gakari as the opening theme and includes scenes from the film Naruto Shippuden the Movie: Bonds in the opening sequence.

== Episodes ==
| No. overall | No. in season | Title | Directed by | Written by | Original release date | English air date |
|---|---|---|---|---|---|---|
Immortal Devastators – Hidan and Kakuzu
| 72 | 1 | "The Quietly Approaching Threat"; Transliteration: "Shinobiyoru kyōi" (Japanese: 忍び寄る脅威) | Hiroshi Kimura | Masahiro Hikokubo | August 21, 2008 | March 16, 2011 |
Asuma apologizes at the grave of the Third Hokage for not understanding his advice concerning what the "king" he is to protect is. At the hospital, Naruto Uzumaki and Sai recover before the former resumes his training. Tsunade receives a report from Kakashi Hatake, who was sent to rendezvous with Jiraiya, that the Akatsuki are again on the move, having attacked numerous villages. Elsewhere, the Two-Tails Jinchūriki, Yugito Nii of the Village Hidden in the Clouds in the Land of Lightning, struggles against Hidan and Kakuzu prior to allowing the Two-Tailed Cat to fully manifest. However, Hidan defeats Yugito and the Two-Tails with him and Kakuzu knowing their next destination is the Land of Fire.
| 73 | 2 | "Akatsuki's Invasion"; Transliteration: "Akatsuki shinkō" (Japanese: "暁"侵攻) | Masaki Takuno | Masahiro Hikokubo | August 28, 2008 | March 23, 2011 |
Zetsu arrives to take Yugito away as Hidan and Kakuzu head off for their next assignment, arriving at the Fire Temple where they decimate the monks. Kakuzu recognizes Chiriku as a member of the Shinobi Guardian Twelve and wants to claim the bounty on his head. Chiriku puts up a strong fight but is ultimately defeated and killed by Hidan. Afterwards, despite Hidan's complaints, Kakuzu sets out to collect the bounty on Chiriku before resuming their mission in the Land of Fire. One of the monks informs The Leaf Village of the attack. Meanwhile, Naruto proceeds to the next step of his training: Cutting the flow of a waterfall. After initially failing to do so, and with Naruto becoming more impatient to catch up with Sasuke, Kakashi asks Yamato to expand the waterfall, so Naruto can use even more shadow clones to accelerate the training.
| 74 | 3 | "Under the Starry Sky"; Transliteration: "Hoshizora no moto de" (Japanese: 星空の下(もと)で) | Eitaro Ano | Masahiro Hikokubo | September 4, 2008 | March 30, 2011 |
As Naruto starts the second stage of his wind chakra nature training, Tsunade sends out the Niju Shotai, twenty teams composed of four ninja each, to deal with and exterminate the Akatsuki members in their territory. Shikamaru leaves with Asuma, Izumo, and Kotetsu, whereas Ino and Choji leave with Raido and Aoba. That night, Sakura Haruno cries over her picture of Team 7, and Naruto, after witnessing a shooting star, manages to clear the second stage of his training but subsequently collapses from hunger and exhaustion almost immediately afterward.
| 75 | 4 | "The Old Monk's Prayer"; Transliteration: "Rōsō no inori" (Japanese: 老僧の祈り) | Masaaki Kumagai | Yasuyuki Suzuki | September 11, 2008 | April 6, 2011 |
Asuma's team arrives at the Fire Temple and mourns Chiriku's death. Izumo and Shikamaru realize that the Akatsuki must be trying to claim the bounty on his head, and would be headed to an exchange point. Elsewhere, Hidan and Kakuzu continue towards the bounty exchange point with the two bantering over their opposing ideals. At Ichiraku, Kakashi tells Naruto that he has something up his sleeve that will surprise him. Back at the training ground, Kakashi shows Naruto that he too, like Jiraiya and Naruto, is able to perform the Rasengan.
| 76 | 5 | "The Next Step"; Transliteration: "Tsuginaru Suteppu" (Japanese: 次なる階段(ステップ)) | Kiyomu Fukuda | Yasuyuki Suzuki | September 25, 2008 | April 16, 2011 |
Kakashi reveals that the Rasengan is an incomplete jutsu (of an extreme change in chakra form) as he is not able to combine his own elemental chakra affinity/nature into it, just as its creator, Kakashi's sensei, the Fourth Hokage could not do. Kakashi explains that this is why he developed the Chidori, as he couldn't combine his lightning nature with the Rasengan. He then presumes that Naruto might be the first one to be able to do so, and surpass the Fourth Hokage. Naruto's training increases his stress to the point that the Nine-Tails Cloak almost manifests before Yamato manages to suppress it entirely. Meanwhile, Asuma sends word to the other teams about the Akatsuki's location and proceeds on to the exchange point. Kakuzu eventually reaches the checkpoint and exchanges Chiriku's corpse, explaining to a concerned collector that there is a reason why he and Hidan are partners.
| 77 | 6 | "Climbing Silver"; Transliteration: "Bōgin" (Japanese: 棒銀) | Yuki Kinoshita | Masahiro Hikokubo | September 25, 2008 | April 23, 2011 |
Asuma's team reaches the bounty station and ambushes Hidan. Izumo and Kotetsu attack, but are unable to kill him despite stabbing vital organs due to Hidan's immortality. Asuma says that if they retreat, Konoha will be endangered. Shikamaru realizes that Asuma is considering sacrificing himself to help defeat the enemy. Asuma begins fighting Hidan, while Shikamaru distracts him by forcing him to dodge his Shadow Stitching Jutsu, as Izumo and Kotetsu back him up. Asuma uses Chiruku's Jutsu. Hidan cuts Asuma on the cheek with his scythe, drinking the blood while drawing a circle of blood on the ground. Asuma then uses a Burning Ash Jutsu and Fire Style Jutsu on Hidan who steps into the circle, his skin pigment changing while he is engulfed in the flames.
| 78 | 7 | "The Judgment"; Transliteration: "Kudasareta sabaki" (Japanese: 下された裁き) | Shigeharu Takahashi | Masahiro Hikokubo | October 2, 2008 | April 30, 2011 |
Asuma's Fire Jutsu strikes Hidan, but, to his team's surprise, Asuma gets burnt as well. Hidan then reveals that he is conducting a ritual that allows him to create an empathic link between himself and the one whose blood he swallowed. Asuma rushes at Hidan but collapses after Hidan stabs himself in the leg, thereby injuring Asuma. Shikamaru realizes Hidan needs to be in the circle for his curse ritual to take effect, and so, uses his Shadow Possession Jutsu to force Hidan to step out of it. As he does so, Asuma is able to use his chakra knife to decapitate Hidan.
| 79 | 8 | "Unfulfilled Scream"; Transliteration: "Todokanu zekkyō" (Japanese: 届かぬ絶叫) | Atsushi Nigorikawa | Masahiro Hikokubo | October 2, 2008 | May 7, 2011 |
Despite being beheaded by Asuma, Hidan is still alive yet unable to move his body. Seeing this while his partner humbles himself to request his help, Kakuzu sews Hidan's head back on his body with threads that sprout from his body. Izumo and Kotetsu try to attack Kakuzu using a Water Style: Syrup Jutsu, but he manages to grab them both by using his body threads, restraining them and suffocating them as well. Hidan, now able to move again, returns to the circle, unbeknownst to Asuma, and stabs himself with the blades of his scythe, and he finishes the ritual by stabbing himself in the chest with another spike. This fatally wounds Asuma, as a shocked Shikamaru watches on.
| 80 | 9 | "Last Words"; Transliteration: "Saigo no kotoba" (Japanese: 最期の言葉) | Hiroshi Kimura | Masahiro Hikokubo | October 16, 2008 | May 14, 2011 |
Asuma is mortally wounded and collapses. Shortly thereafter, Ino, Choji, Aoba, and Raido appear as the team's backup. Hidan and Kakuzu prove to be a match for them, too, but they are ordered back to the hideout by their "leader" to seal the Two-Tails, from the Jinchuriki that they captured before. They retreat, warning the group that they will return. Ino tries to treat Asuma with her medical jutsu, but fails, as Hidan's attacks had damaged too many of his vital organs. Asuma leaves advice for his students and whispers to Shikamaru the identity of the "king" that Konoha must protect. He smokes a final cigarette, before dying a death fit for a ninja.
| 81 | 10 | "Sad News"; Transliteration: "Kanashiki shirase" (Japanese: 悲しき報せ) | Shinji Satou | Masahiro Hikokubo | October 23, 2008 | May 21, 2011 |
Naruto struggles to combine the shape and elemental manipulation in the Rasengan, and feels discouraged. Elsewhere, the Akatsuki begin sealing the Two-Tails. Following Hidan's dissent, their "leader" reveals the organization's plan to establish a war monopoly, beginning with smaller villages that need help to defend themselves, while obtaining all nine Tailed Beasts for their ultimate goal: world domination. Meanwhile, news of Asuma's death reaches Konoha just as Naruto, inspired by Kakashi, realizes the solution is to use two shadow clones instead of one to stabilize the Rasengan and infuse wind nature chakra into it. Shikamaru, after informing Tsunade of Asuma's death, says he will personally inform Kurenai, since he has a message from Asuma.
| 82 | 11 | "Team Ten"; Transliteration: "Daijuppan" (Japanese: 第十班) | Toshiyuki Tsuru | Toshiyuki Tsuru | October 30, 2008 | June 4, 2011 |
The people of Konoha attend the funeral held for Asuma, excluding Shikamaru. After a careful prodding by his father during a game of Shogi, Shikamaru works through his emotions and comes up with a strategy to defeat Hidan and Kakuzu. Team 10 visits Asuma's grave before setting out for, but Tsunade stops them, telling them that they need a four-man squad and backup for the mission. Kakashi volunteers as the leader of the team, when it becomes clear Team 10 has no intention of backing down.
| 83 | 12 | "Target: Locked On"; Transliteration: "Tāgetto Rokkuon" (Japanese: 標的捕捉(ターゲット・ロックオン)) | Takahiro Ono | Yuka Miyata | November 6, 2008 | June 18, 2011 |
Tsunade tells Sakura that Team 7 will be Team 10's backup, but only if Naruto finishes his training for a day. Elsewhere, Shikamaru quickly adjusts the team's strategy to include Kakashi, and Yugito dies after the Two-Tails is fully extracted from her and placed in the Gedo Statue. Hidan and Kakuzu resume their hunt of the Nine-Tails Jinchūriki before they are found, Shikamaru pinning their shadows with Asuma's chakra knives imbued with his chakra. Using his Shadow Possession Jutsu, he forces Hidan to attack Kakuzu, but Kakuzu dodges the attempt, making Shikamaru realize that he had secretly detached his arm during Shikamaru's previous attack to remove the chakra knife pinning his shadow. With Kakuzu cornered, Choji then attacks Kakuzu from above.
| 84 | 13 | "Kakuzu's Abilities"; Transliteration: "Kakuzu no nōryoku" (Japanese: 角都の能力) | Kiyomu Fukuda | Yuka Miyata | November 13, 2008 | June 25, 2011 |
Choji's spiked cannonball attack proves ineffective against Kakuzu's special ability, which enables him to harden his skin. In Konoha, Naruto learns more about the five elemental chakra natures and their strengths and weaknesses in relation to each other, while almost being ready to complete his training. Kakuzu gets struck by Kakashi's Lightning Blade right through his heart, but survives and produces four masked entities from his back, one of which dies, as it had been struck by Kakashi. Kakuzu then uses the masks to attack Team 10 with powerful Wind, Lightning, and Fire Jutsus.
| 85 | 14 | "The Terrifying Secret"; Transliteration: "Osorubeki himitsu" (Japanese: 恐るべき秘密) | Toshiyuki Tsuru | Toshiyuki Tsuru | November 20, 2008 | July 2, 2011 |
Hidan and Kakuzu gain the upper hand. Ino and Choji are strangled by Kakuzu, while Kakashi escapes Hidan with a shadow clone. Shikamaru uses the masked entity's Lightning Jutsu in combination with water to free his teammates. Shikamaru realizes Kakuzu has five hearts, each of which must be killed to defeat him. He also reasons that separating Kakuzu from Hidan is the only way to defeat them, and so, he uses Shadow Possession Jutsu to lead Hidan into a dense forest. Kakuzu combines two of his hearts into a single entity and prepares to face Kakashi, Ino and Choji to get a replacement heart. He says that he has much more battle experience than Kakashi, having once faced off against the First Hokage, and uses the hearts of his defeated enemies to stay alive, and use other chakra natures. At the same time, after taking Hidan into a forest amidst numerous explosive tags, Shikamaru's Shadow Possession Jutsu runs out. Hidan manages to scratch Shikamaru on the face, and drinks the apparent spilled blood in preparation for his curse ritual to kill Shikamaru.
| 86 | 15 | "Shikamaru's Genius"; Transliteration: "Shikamaru no Sai" (Japanese: シカマルの才) | Masaaki Kumagai | Yuka Miyata | December 4, 2008 | July 9, 2011 |
Hidan stabs himself in the chest, but instead of mortally wounding Shikamaru, he accidentally destroys another one of Kakuzu's hearts. When Hidan demanded an explanation about why he still was alive, Shikamaru reveals to have poured Kakuzu's blood (that Kakashi had retrieved earlier in a capsule when attacking Kakuzu with Lightning Blade) on Hidan's spear, and so he had killed one of Kakuzu's hearts by performing his ritual. He also traps Hidan with his Shadow Possession Jutsu though the Akatsuki member is able to slowly move towards him. Being temporarily incapacitated, Kakuzu's masked beast returns to his body with one of them sacrificing itself to become his heart. Kakuzu partially transforms into a beast, and immobilizes Kakashi, Ino, and Choji. Just as Kakuzu is about to finish them off with another Fire-Wind Jutsu, new Team Kakashi arrives in time to stop the attack with Naruto and Yamato's Wind-Water Hurricane Vortex Jutsu combo, using the new Wind Style: Rasengan, and Water Style: Ripping Torrent. Naruto apologizes for being late as he and others brace themselves for battle against Kakuzu.
| 87 | 16 | "When You Curse Someone, You Dig Your Own Grave"; Transliteration: "Hito o norowaba ana futatsu" (Japanese: 人を呪わば穴二つ) | Shigeharu Takahashi | Yasuyuki Suzuki | December 4, 2008 | July 16, 2011 |
Kakashi summons Pakkun to help Sakura and Sai track and assist Shikamaru. Hidan attempts to break out of Shikamaru's weakened Shadow Possession Jutsu on him, but Shikamaru reveals he was pretending as he uses the Shadow Pull Jutsu to pull the explosive tags onto Hidan's body. Shikamaru then opens a trap hole – a grave for Hidan – that he had prepared hours in advance while revealing the forest to be a place only members of the Nara Clan can freely enter, explaining that he intends to avenge Asuma by burying Hidan in the forest. Shikamaru has a vision of Asuma entrusting his "Will of Fire" to him, and then throws his lighter to ignite the tags on Hidan, with the Akatsuki member's body being blown to bits. Kakashi explains Kakuzu's abilities to Yamato, and asks if Naruto completed adding wind chakra to the Rasengan. Yamato says it only works 50% of the time, as Kakashi recalls how Naruto was able to cancel out his own Rasengan during training, reminding him of the Fourth Hokage. Meanwhile, Naruto prepares the new Jutsu that he had been developing: Wind Style: Rasen Shuriken.
| 88 | 17 | "Wind Style: Rasen Shuriken!"; Transliteration: "Fūton: Rasenshuriken!" (Japanese: 風遁·螺旋手裏剣!) | Atsushi Nigorikawa | Yasuyuki Suzuki | December 11, 2008 | July 23, 2011 |
Naruto attacks Kakuzu with his Rasen Shuriken, but his attack dissipates before he can land a hit. Meanwhile, with Hidan's dismembered remains in the trap hole, Shikamaru uses another explosive tag to fill in the hole over the remains of a dismembered yet living Hidan, ultimately avenging Asuma's death. He is joined by Sakura and Sai, and they head back to the others. Naruto once again creates a Rasen Shuriken, and Kakuzu switches to a long-range mode to counter his attack. As Naruto, with his shadow clones, rush towards Kakuzu, the latter flies over and nails the original Naruto. But this is revealed to be a shadow clone, and the real Naruto manages to lands a critical hit with a second Rasen Shuriken, destroying both of Kakuzu's replacement hearts. His comrades, especially Kakashi, watch on in awe.

== Home media release ==
=== Japanese ===
| Volume | Date | Discs | Episodes | Reference |
|---|---|---|---|---|
| 1 | January 14, 2009 | 1 | 72–75 | |
| 2 | February 4, 2009 | 1 | 76–79 | |
| 3 | March 4, 2009 | 1 | 80–83 | |
| 4 | May 13, 2009 | 1 | 84–88 | |

=== English ===
Viz Media (North America, Region 1 DVD box sets)
| Box set | Date | Discs | Episodes | Reference |
|---|---|---|---|---|
| 6 | April 26, 2011 | 3 | 66–77 | |
| 7 | July 12, 2011 | 3 | 78–88 | |

Viz Media (North America, Region 1 Blu-ray sets)
| Volume | Date | Discs | Episodes | Ref. |
|---|---|---|---|---|
| 3 | May 14, 2024 | 4 | 56–82 | |
| 4 | September 10, 2024 | 4 | 83–110 | |

Manga Entertainment (United Kingdom, Region 2)
| Volume | Date | Discs | Episodes | Reference |
|---|---|---|---|---|
| 6 | July 11, 2011 | 2 | 66–77 | |
| 7 | November 7, 2011 | 2 | 78–88 | |

Madman Entertainment (Australia/New Zealand, Region 4)
| Collection | Date | Discs | Episodes | Reference |
|---|---|---|---|---|
| 6 | July 20, 2011 | 2 | 66–77 | |
| 7 | November 16, 2011 | 2 | 78–88 | |
