= Naruto: Shippuden season 2 =

Naruto: Shippuden
- Season 2
- Season 2 Cover
- No. of episodes: 21

Release
- Original network: TV Tokyo
- Original release: November 8, 2007 – April 3, 2008

Season chronology
- ← Previous; Season 1 Next → Season 3

The second season of the Naruto: Shippuden anime series is directed by Hayato Date, and produced by Pierrot and TV Tokyo. They are based on Part II for Masashi Kishimoto's manga series. Titled Long-Awaited Reunion (遥かなる再会, Harukanaru Saikai), the season follows Naruto Uzumaki and his friends attempting to reason with Sasuke Uchiha. The second season aired from November 2007 to April 2008 on TV Tokyo. It was also released on DVD in Japan over five discs between April 8 and August 8, 2008, by Aniplex.

Naruto Shippuden premiered in the United States in Disney XD in late 2009, with these episodes airing between April 2 and October 27, 2010. The season ran on Adult Swim's Toonami programming block from August 17, 2014, to February 8, 2015.

The season was collected in five DVD volumes by Viz Media from April 6 to August 10, 2010. It was also compiled in two DVD boxes alongside the first season's last episodes on August 3 and October 19, 2010. In the United Kingdom, Manga Entertainment released it in three volumes from October 10, 2010, to May 16, 2011, while it was also part of a DVD box released on March 7, 2011.

The season uses three musical themes: one opening theme and two ending themes. The opening theme is "Distance" by Long Shot Party, while the ending themes are "Kimi Monogatari" (キミモノガタリ; "Your Story") by Little by Little (used for episodes 33 to 41) and "Mezamero! Yasei" (目覚めろ!野性; "Awaken! Wild") by Matchy with Question (used for episodes 42 to 53).

== Episodes ==
No. overall	No. in season	Title	Directed by	Written by	Original release date	English air date
Long-Awaited Reunion
33	1	"The New Target"; Transliteration: "Aratanaru Tāgetto" (Japanese: 新たなる目標(ターゲット))	Masaaki Kumagai	Satoru Nishizono	November 8, 2007	April 28, 2010
In Konoha, Kakashi Hatake rests in a hospital, while Sakura Haruno tells Tsunade that the deceased Akatsuki member Sasori told her that he was supposed to meet a spy within Orochimaru's ranks at the Tenchi Bridge in ten days' time. As four days had already passed, Naruto Uzumaki realizes the need of another teammate and so, starting searching Konoha for a willing recruit. He runs into Team 8, but they are unable to help, as they are assigned a mission of their own. Later, just as Choji agrees to help Naruto, the two and Shikamaru are attacked by Sai.
34	2	"Formation! New Team Kakashi!"; Transliteration: "Kessei! Shin Kakashi han" (Japanese: 結成!新カカシ班)	Eitaro Ano	Satoru Nishizono	November 15, 2007	May 5, 2010
Unable to identify Sai, Naruto, Choji and Shikamaru attempt to capture him, but Sai withdraws, while Ino, just arrived, does not notice anything, but happily greets Naruto for not having seen him for 3 years. Concerned that Akatsuki might soon come to Konoha looking for the Nine-Tailed Fox, the village elders confront Tsunade. They propose to Tsunade to keep Naruto in Konoha and not send him to missions outside the village. Tsunade declines, and promises to protect Konoha with her own life if Naruto is captured. But she is still forced to compromise with the Foundation's leader Danzo Shimura in having Sai made a member to Team Kakashi. With Kakashi in the hospital, Tsunade temporarily replaces him with ANBU member. Code-named Yamato, the ANBU operative is given the task to keep an eye on Sai. Later, Naruto and Sakura meet their new team members, and Naruto is immediately angered upon Sai's appearance.
35	3	"An Unnecessary Addition"; Transliteration: "Gadatensoku" (Japanese: 画蛇添足(がだてんそく))	Masahiko Murata	Satoru Nishizono	November 22, 2007	May 12, 2010
Yamato takes leadership of Team Kakashi, while Sai, devoid of any human feelings or emotions, insults both Naruto and Sakura. While preparing to set off, Sai receives an envelope from an ANBU Root shinobi containing secret orders from Danzo. Jiraiya then meets with Tsunade and Yamato in Kakashi's hospital room to brief Yamato on the Nine-Tailed Fox sealed within Naruto, detailing the "demon fox's cloak", and revealing a huge scar on his chest he got from Naruto when the boy lost control after he ascended to a Four-Tailed form. Tsunade reveals Danzo's disdain for her, due to his disagreements with the First and Third Hokage. Finally, the new Team Kakashi sets off on their new mission to capture and intercept the spy in Orochimaru's subordinates, and gather information about Sasuke Uchiha.
36	4	"The Fake Smile"; Transliteration: "Itsuwari no egao" (Japanese: 偽りの笑顔)	Kiyomu Fukuda	Satoru Nishizono	November 29, 2007	May 19, 2010
Team Kakashi heads out for the Tenchi Bridge. Sakura and Naruto come down hard at Sai for making fun of their former teammate, Sasuke. Seeing the tension in the team, Yamato decides they need to improve on teamwork and uses the Wood Style Jutsu to create a wooden cage, threatening to lock the trio up unless they behave. Sakura is shocked to see Yamato using the secret techniques that only the First Hokage was said to possess. Given an ultimatum between being locked up or spending the night at a hot springs by Yamato, the team chooses to visit the springs to improve team cohesion. Despite this fact, Naruto still despises Sai.
37	5	"Untitled"; Transliteration: "Mudai" (Japanese: 無題)	Atsushi Nigorikawa	Satoru Nishizono	November 29, 2007	May 26, 2010
Sakura sees Sai drawing by a river and finds out that he has artistic talent, but has never given titles to anything he ever drew. Naruto and Sakura begin to realize the reason behind Sai's repulsive personality. After the hot springs, the team heads off to the Tenchi Bridge to meet with Sasori's spy. Yamato, being suspicious of traps, suggests to the team to alter their route and go through a forest. Camping for the night, Yamato then creates a two story house by again using his Wood Style Jutsu. Inside the house, the team formulates their plan of capturing the spy.
38	6	"Simulation"; Transliteration: "Shimyurēshon" (Japanese: 模擬戦闘訓練(シミュレーション))	Shigeharu Takahashi	Satoru Nishizono	December 6, 2007	June 2, 2010
Yamato decides to have a mock test for his team to see how everyone coordinates with each other. Naruto is paired with Sai despite his objections, and Sakura is assigned to support Yamato. Yamato conducts a simulation of the meeting, with himself as "the spy", to gauge Naruto and Sai's abilities and teamwork. After Naruto makes a mistake, Sai immobilizes him and goes off alone. Naruto is angered with Sai for not acting as a comrade would, but resolves to work together with him to get Sasuke back. Sai then reveals to Sakura that he has no emotions, and little understanding of them, as a part of his training in ANBU Root.
39	7	"The Tenchi Bridge"; Transliteration: "Tenchikyō" (Japanese: 天地橋)	Masaki Takano	Satoru Nishizono	December 13, 2007	June 16, 2010
Yamato disguises himself as Sasori within Hiruko, and goes to meet "the spy" at the Tenchi Bridge. The spy is revealed to be Kabuto, who spills out the location of Orochimaru's current hideout. Before the meeting could finish, Orochimaru appears and interrupts the two. While Kabuto initially seems frightened by Orochimaru's appearance, it turned out to be a ruse as he attacks the disguised Yamato. After telling Kabuto that the figure is not Sasori, Orochimaru recognizes Yamato as one of the test subjects in his experiments to replicate Hashirama's power through blood transfusion of the First Hokage's DNA. Orochimaru also knows that Yamato is not alone as he tells him to call out Naruto, Sakura and Sai from their hiding places.
40	8	"The Nine-Tails Unleashed"; Transliteration: "Kyūbi kaihō!!" (Japanese: 九尾解放!!)	Hiroshi Kimura	Satoru Nishizono	December 20, 2007	June 23, 2010
Yamato signals Naruto, Sakura, and Sai to appear on the bridge. On seeing Naruto, Orochimaru begins mocking him and compares him to Sasuke, which causes the Nine-Tails's chakra to leak from an enraged Naruto's body and ascends him to a Three-Tailed Fox form. Meanwhile, Yamato remembers Jiraiya speaking of the appearance of number of tails on Naruto during their training, specifically warning of Naruto's Four-Tailed Fox transformation, and how Yamato shared the First Hokage's power of control over Tailed Beasts due to Orochimaru's experiments.
41	9	"The Top-Secret Mission Begins"; Transliteration: "Gokuhi ninmu sutāto" (Japanese: 極秘任務スタート)	Masaaki Kumagai	Satoru Nishizono	December 20, 2007	June 30, 2010
Naruto gets more enraged in his Three-Tailed Fox state, and throws Kabuto away, who inadvertently knocks Sakura out too. Naruto's anger eventually escalates to him destroying the Tenchi Bridge and he takes to a forest to battle Orochimaru. Sai creates an ink bird and flies beneath the collapsing bridge to the site of Naruto and Orochimaru's battle, instead of catching a falling Sakura. Yamato saves her using his Wood Style Jutsu, and creates a wood clone to follow Sai. In the forest, Naruto's ever-increasing aggression causes his blood to mix with the Nine-Tails's chakra as his chakra cloak envelops him in the form of a Four-Tailed Miniature Fox.
42	10	"Orochimaru vs. Jinchuriki"; Transliteration: "Orochimaru tai Jinchūriki" (Japanese: 大蛇丸VS人柱力)	Masahiko Murata	Satoru Nishizono	January 10, 2008	July 7, 2010
Naruto, in his Four-Tailed Fox form, attacks Orochimaru, and devastates the surrounding landscape, also preventing Sai and Yamato's wood clone from approaching him. The majority of Orochimaru's attacks prove to be ineffective against Naruto, but he still manages to keep up with Naruto with his Regeneration Jutsu. Meanwhile, Kabuto advances toward Sakura and Yamato, deducing that Sasori has died. Orochimaru finally manages to strike Naruto with his Kusanagi Sword, even though he fails to pierce the sword through him. Seeing Naruto in his Four-Tailed Fox state, Sakura is awestruck and terrified.
43	11	"Sakura's Tears"; Transliteration: "Sakura no namida" (Japanese: サクラの涙)	Kunitoshi Okajima	Satoru Nishizono	January 17, 2008	July 14, 2010
Kabuto states that Naruto's current form is a consequence of his desperation to bring back Sasuke to Konoha. Sakura begins to cry and tries to approach Naruto, but is injured by him. Yamato erects chakra-suppressing wooden pillars using his Wood Style to bind Naruto before he does any more harm. Kabuto heals Sakura and disappears after reasoning that the Konoha ninja are not Orochimaru's enemies because they are also fighting the Akatsuki. Yamato forcibly returns Naruto to his normal state. Meanwhile, Sai, who was hiding nearby the battlefield the entire time, confronts Orochimaru on behalf of orders from Danzo.
44	12	"The Secret of the Battle!"; Transliteration: "Tatakai no tenmatsu" (Japanese: 戦いの顛末)	Kiyomu Fukuda	Satoru Nishizono	January 24, 2008	July 21, 2010
Sakura tries to heal Naruto, but her medical ninjutsu has little effect on his wounds. In the forest, Orochimaru tries to kill Sai, but it is revealed to be an ink clone. The real Sai emerges from the ground and gives Orochimaru a letter from Danzo. Sai, then, leaves with Orochimaru and Kabuto for their hideout, with Yamato's wood clone on their trail. After Naruto comes to his senses, the team reaches the battlefield spot, and picks up Sai's picture book. From what his clone observed, Yamato infers that Danzo seeks to destroy Konoha with Orochimaru's aid.
45	13	"The Consequences of Betrayal"; Transliteration: "Uragiri no hate" (Japanese: 裏切りの果て)	Atsushi Nigorikawa	Satoru Nishizono	January 31, 2008	July 28, 2010
To confuse and slow down Yamato's wood clone, Kabuto creates a fake corpse, resembling Sai. Naruto, still recovering from the effects of his Four-Tailed Fox state, is told to stay behind by Yamato. However, Naruto tells Yamato he is fine and the trio continue to follow Sai. During their pursuit, the team is forced to take a break when Sakura's own injuries take their toll on her. As she heals herself, Yamato talks to Naruto in solace, and tells him that it was he, in his Four-Tailed Fox form, who hurt Sakura. Naruto is shocked to know this and condemns his own actions by using the Nine-Tails chakra.
46	14	"The Unfinished Page"; Transliteration: "Mikan no Pēji" (Japanese: 未完の頁(ページ))	Shigeharu Takahashi	Satoru Nishizono	February 7, 2008	August 4, 2010
Yamato tells Naruto not to rely on the Nine-Tails chakra as he is strong enough on his own. The Konoha team decides to browse Sai's book to give them some clue about him, and they notice that its filled with the story of two boys' paths and battles, however, the pages where the two boys would meet are unfinished. Meanwhile, Orochimaru's group reach their hideout, not realizing that Yamato's wood clone had spotted them. There, Sai confronts a shadowed Sasuke, realizing that this is the man whom Naruto and Sakura have been searching for.
47	15	"Infiltration: The Den of the Snake!"; Transliteration: "Sennyū! Dokuhebi no ajito" (Japanese: 潜入!毒蛇の巣窟(アジト))	Neko Okuma	Satoru Nishizono	February 14, 2008	August 11, 2010
Sai is temporarily trapped in a powerful genjutsu from Sasuke's Sharingan, that frightens him. After recovering, Sai tells Sasuke that Naruto sees him as a brother, as told to him by Sakura. Sasuke replies that he has only one brother, the one he is going to kill, and leaves. Orochimaru gives the envelope with information from Danzo about Konoha's ANBU to Kabuto and instructs him to make a bingo book. On reaching near Orochimaru's hideout, Yamato gives Sakura and Naruto wooden seeds to ingest, which are imbued with his chakra, that would enable him to track them down in case they are lost, and reveals that he was able to track Sai with the same seeds that he had secretly fed Sai. In the hideout, Kabuto locks Sai in a room, and the latter summons a bingo book of the same information in the envelope. Outside, Yamato uses an Earth Style Jutsu to open a tunnel into Orochimaru's hideout, and he, Naruto, and Sakura travel to Sai's room undetected.
48	16	"Bonds"; Transliteration: "Tsunagari" (Japanese: つながり)	Hiroshi Kimura	Satoru Nishizono	February 28, 2008	August 18, 2010
Yamato and his team enter Sai's room to confront him. Sai tells them that not only was he to help in Konoha's destruction, but also act as a spy against Orochimaru. Yamato reveals that in ANBU Root, one must murder his own comrades and sever their emotions, but Sakura returns Sai's picture book to him, remarking that he still has emotions because he treasures it. Afterwards, the team ties up Sai. Once outside, Naruto informs Sai about his bonds of a brother with Sasuke and about how far he would go to retrieve Sasuke.
49	17	"Something Important..."; Transliteration: "Taisetsu na mono" (Japanese: 大切なモノ)	Shinji Satou	Satoru Nishizono	March 6, 2008	August 25, 2010
Before Yamato's team departs to find Sasuke in the hideout, Kabuto appears in front of them and attacks them, before freeing Sai. However, Sai, wanting to learn more about his own bonds with his deceased brother through Naruto's bond with Sasuke, betrays Kabuto and aids Yamato in his capture. A tied up Kabuto gives a vague description of Sasuke's location to the team, thinking that Orochimaru would just kill them either way. Leaving Yamato's wood clone to watch over Kabuto, Yamato and his team enter Orochimaru's hideout and they split up to find Sasuke, Naruto and Sai heading one way, with Sakura and Yamato to another.
50	18	"The Picture Book's Story"; Transliteration: "Ehon ga kataru Sutōri" (Japanese: 絵本が語る物語(ストーリー))	Eitaro Ano	Satoru Nishizono	March 13, 2008	September 1, 2010
As the Konoha team continues their search for Sasuke, Naruto suddenly collapses due to exhaustion from his previous battle with Orochimaru. As Naruto wakes up, Sai remembers what he wanted to draw in the middle pages of his picture book: him and his brother smiling; an action which Sai mirrors. As Sai talks about his bonds, Orochimaru suddenly appears and attacks them. Sakura and Yamato come to Naruto's aid, while Sai goes alone to continue the search. Just as Sai finds Sasuke with his ink rats, Yamato finds Sai's bingo book and realizes Sai's actual mission upon finding Sasuke listed as a target for assassination.
51	19	"Reunion"; Transliteration: "Saikai" (Japanese: 再会)	Masaaki Kumagai	Satoru Nishizono	March 20, 2008	September 8, 2010
Yamato suggests that Sai's true objective is to kill Sasuke, who, according to his master Danzo, is a threat to Konoha. Sai enters Sasuke's room and wakes him up. But instead of following his orders and killing Sasuke, Sai reveals that he wants to preserve Naruto and Sasuke's bonds. Sasuke retaliates by causing a giant explosion in his room, which attracts Sakura, Naruto and Yamato's attention. As Naruto and Sakura meet with their former friend, Sai declares that he is discarding his mission orders and now wishes to aid Naruto in bringing Sasuke back home.
52	20	"The Power of Uchiha"; Transliteration: "Uchiha no chikara" (Japanese: うちはの力)	Kiyomu Fukuda	Satoru Nishizono	March 20, 2008	September 15, 2010
With his skills immensely improved over the years, Sasuke begins to attack Naruto, but Sai intervenes. Sasuke keeps the two at bay with his Chidori Current. Sakura decides to charge at Sasuke, but Yamato jumps in front of her, only to wind up being stabbed by Sasuke's Chidori-infused katana. Deep within his conscious, remembering what Yamato told him, Naruto attempts to resist the Nine-Tails's goading before the Nine-Tails attempts to goad Naruto to using its power. However, Sasuke uses his Sharingan to enter Naruto's mind and stop him from reaching the Nine-Tails. With Sasuke meeting him for the first time, the Nine-Tails compares Sasuke's chakra to that of Madara Uchiha before being totally suppressed by the young Uchiha. As his chakra dissipates, the Nine-Tails warns Sasuke not to kill Naruto.
53	21	"Title"; Transliteration: "Taitoru" (Japanese: 題名(タイトル))	Atsushi Nigorikawa	Satoru Nishizono	April 3, 2008	October 27, 2010
Before Sasuke can execute a powerful jutsu to finish the team, Orochimaru, followed by Kabuto, appears and stops him. Orochimaru and Kabuto convince Sasuke to leave his former team mates alive to weaken the Akatsuki's numbers for him. Forced to watch Sasuke leave with Orochimaru, a weeping Naruto laments failing to bring their friend back to Konoha before Sakura reassures him that they will get another chance. Back in Konoha, Tsunade receives Yamato's reports and is greatly angered over Danzo's treachery of leaking classified information of Konoha ANBU to Orochimaru. In the ANBU Root base, Sai asks Danzo to allow him to remain longer with Team Kakashi, as well as keep his name. Danzo reluctantly agrees. Later, Sai goes on a mission with his team, having come to see them as his friends.

== Home media release ==
=== Japanese ===
Volume	Date	Discs	Episodes	Reference
1	April 2, 2008	1	33–36	
2	May 9, 2008	1	37–40	
3	June 4, 2008	1	41–44	
4	July 2, 2008	1	45–48	
5	August 6, 2008	1	49–53	

=== English ===
Viz Media (North America, Region 1 DVD singles)
Volume	Date	Discs	Episodes	Reference
8	April 6, 2010	1	31–34	
9	May 18, 2010	1	35–39	
10	June 1, 2010	1	40–43	
11	July 13, 2010	1	44–48	
12	August 10, 2010	1	49–53	

Viz Media (North America, Region 1 DVD box sets)
Box set	Date	Discs	Episodes	Reference
3	August 3, 2010	3	27–39	
4	October 19, 2010	3	40–53	

Manga Entertainment (United Kingdom, Region 2 single volumes)
Volume	Date	Discs	Episodes	Reference
3	October 10, 2010	2	27–39	
4	December 27, 2010	2	40–52	
5	May 16, 2011		53–65	

Viz Media (North America, Region 1 Blu-ray sets)
Volume	Date	Discs	Episodes	Ref.
2	January 30, 2024	4	28–55	

Manga Entertainment (United Kingdom, Region 2 box sets)
Box Set	Date	Discs	Episodes	Reference
1	March 7, 2011	8	1–52	
2	June 4, 2012	8	53–100	

Madman Entertainment (Australia/New Zealand, Region 4)
Collection	Date	Discs	Episodes	Reference
3	September 1, 2010	2	27–39	
4	November 3, 2010	2	40–52	
5	February 16, 2011	2	53–65	
