= Maboroshi (song) =

Single by Joe Inoue

from the album Me! Me! Me!
- Released: February 18, 2009
- Genre: Rock, J-Pop
- Length: 10:00
- Label: Ki/oon Records
- Songwriter(s): Joe Inoue
- Producer(s): Joe Inoue

Joe Inoue singles chronology
"Closer" (2008)	"Maboroshi" (2009)	"Go!" (2009)

"Maboroshi" (幻, lit. "Illusion") is the third single by Japanese-American recording artist Joe Inoue, and the last of his singles off of Me! Me! Me!. The single stayed on the Oricon Weekly Singles Charts for 1 week and peaked at 156. The title track was used as a theme song for the Uchikuru!? variety show. Both the title track and "Party Night (Odoritari Night)" are featured on Me! Me! Me!.

== Track listing ==
1. "Maboroshi" (幻, "Illusion") – 4:45
2. "P.J. Anthem" – 2:31
3. "Party Night (Odoritari Night)" (PARTY NIGHT～踊り足りNight～, "Party Night (Not Enough Dancing)") – 2:46
