= Kaze no Gotoku =

Single by Joe Inoue

from the album Dos Angeles
- Released: August 4, 2010
- Genre: Post-hardcore, j-pop
- Length: 17:00
- Label: Ki/oon Records
- Songwriter: Joe Inoue
- Producer: Joe Inoue

Joe Inoue singles chronology
"Go!" (2009)	"Kaze no Gotoku" (2010)

"Kaze no Gotoku" (風のごとく; "Like the Wind") is Japanese-American recording artist Joe Inoue's fifth single, and the second from his album Dos Angeles. The song was used for the opening theme of a season of the reruns of the anime Gin Tama known as Yorinuki Gin Tama-san. "Kaze no Gotoku" remained on the Oricon Weekly Singles Charts for three weeks, peaking at 33. A variation of the song was included on Dos Angeles subtitled the "B.B.B. ver.", "B.B.B." standing for the nonsense phrase "Buri Buri Bass".

The title track was also released to the American iTunes Store on October 5, 2010.

== Track listing ==
1. "Kaze no Gotoku" (風のごとく; "Like the Wind") – 3:48
2. "Sekai no Kakera" (世界のかけら; "Fragment of the World") – 3:41
3. "Ballerina" – 4:05
4. "Kaze no Gotoku (Gin Tama Opening ver.)" (風のごとく -銀魂 オープニング ver.-, Kaze no Gotoku -Gintama Ōpuningu ver.-) – 1:43
5. "Kaze no Gotoku 'Kerioki' ver. (Karaoke)" (風のごとく -“ケリオキ”ver.- (KARAOKE)) – 3:46
