= Hello! (Joe Inoue song) =

Single by Joe Inoue

from the album Me! Me! Me!
- Released: July 16, 2008
- Genre: Rock, J-Pop
- Length: 11:05
- Label: Ki/oon Records
- Songwriter: Joe Inoue
- Producer: Joe Inoue

Joe Inoue singles chronology
"Hello!" (2008)	"Closer" (2008)

"Hello!" (stylized as "HELLO!") is the debut single by Japanese-American recording artist Joe Inoue. It is the first single from his album Me! Me! Me!. The single peaked on the Oricon Weekly Singles Charts at 189, remaining on the charts for only one week. The A-side was used as the theme song for the 21st Century Edison variety show and was also used in commercials for Glico's Pocky product. Both the title track and the B-side "One Man Band" appear on Me! Me! Me!.

== Track listing ==
1. "Hello!" – 3:45
2. "One Man Band" – 3:39
3. "Taisetsu (Ties the Two)" (たいせつ～ties the two～; "Important (Ties the Two)") – 3:42
4. "Hello!-instrumental-" – 3:46
