= Naruto: Shippuden season 3 =

Naruto: Shippuden
- Season 3
- Season 3 Cover
- No. of episodes: 18

Release
- Original network: TV Tokyo
- Original release: April 3 – August 14, 2008

Season chronology
- ← Previous; Season 2 Next → Season 4

The third season of the Naruto: Shippuden anime series is directed by Hayato Date, and produced by Studio Pierrot and TV Tokyo. They are based on Part II for Masashi Kishimoto's manga series. The third season aired from April to August 2008 on TV Tokyo. Titled in Japan Twelve Guardian Ninja (守護忍十二士, Shugonin Jūnishi), the anime only season follows Naruto Uzumaki attempting to protect Asuma Sarutobi's monk named Sora and defeat Team Furido. It is also the first season to be produced in 16:9 widescreen, instead of 4:3, which was the aspect ratio of all previous seasons.

The season was released on three DVDs in Japan between September 3 and November 5, 2008, by Aniplex. The English dub began airing on Disney XD on October 28, 2009, with the season aired between November 3, 2010, and March 9, 2011. The season ran on Adult Swim's Toonami programming block from February 15 to June 21, 2015.

Viz Media also released it in two DVD boxes on January 25 and April 26, 2011. Manga Entertainment released it in two boxes in the United Kingdom on May 16 and July 11, 2011.

The opening theme for this season was "Blue Bird" (ブルーバード; Burūbādo) by Ikimono-gakari, and the ending themes were "Sunao na Niji" (素直な虹; "Honest Rainbow") by Surface (used for episodes 54 to 65) and "Broken Youth" by NICO Touches the Walls (used for episodes 66 to 71). The second feature film for the series, Naruto Shippuden The Movie: Bonds, was released on August 2, 2008. The broadcast versions of episodes 70 and 71 include scenes from the film in the opening themes, while still retaining the original music.

== Episodes ==
No. overall	No. in season	Title	Directed by	Written by	Original release date	English air date
Twelve Guardian Ninja
54	1	"Nightmare"; Transliteration: "Akumu" (Japanese: 悪夢)	Shigeharu Takahashi	Yasuyuki Suzuki	April 3, 2008	November 3, 2010
Naruto has a nightmare about his Version 2 form wreaking havoc, causing him to wake up and question his dream. Sai is in the Konoha Library reading books on how to create and forge friendships. Naruto is sitting on some steps, musing over Sasuke's remarks about giving himself over to Orochimaru if it ensured exacting his vengeance upon Itachi. Sai remembers an excerpt from the library book that explained how friends use nicknames to sustain a friendship. He asks Sakura and Naruto if he may enter their conversation, surprising them. Wanting to create nicknames for the two, Sai is unable to find the correct words and is told by Sakura to use personality traits as a basis. After checking Sakura out, which causes her to blush, he smiles and calls her ugly. As they visit Kakashi in the hospital, Naruto attempts to tell Kakashi that they met Sasuke, but Kakashi tells them that he already knows as Yamato had debriefed him. Naruto and Sakura remark that Sasuke has gotten exceedingly strong, Kakashi states that the team would simply have to get stronger, especially Naruto. When Naruto inquires about the strategy, Kakashi tells him that the two of them will be creating a brand new, unique ninjutsu technique more powerful than the Rasengan that only he would be able to use. At the barbeque lunch, Ino notices Sai and develops an infatuation on him. Shikamaru privately tells Naruto that Tsunade had informed him about his encounter with Sasuke, and now that the Chūnin Exams were over, he would be free to tag along the next time. At the Hospital Asuma states that word of Akatsuki's activities has increased outside of the village, and due to their hunt for tailed beasts, it would only be a matter of time before they reached Konoha. At the restaurant, Sai, wanting to create a nickname realises that certain words are not acceptable to use as nicknames, and after his incident with Sakura, believes that women do not like to be called what they look like; instead, he chooses to refer to women as the opposite of what they are. After looking at Ino, he decides to call her beautiful. Outside the village, two grave robbers ransack graves, only to claim that they haven't found whom they're looking for.
55	2	"Wind"; Transliteration: "Kaze" (Japanese: 旋風(かぜ))	Masahiko Murata	Yasuyuki Suzuki	April 17, 2008	November 10, 2010
Kakashi and Naruto meet at the training field in order to help teach Naruto how to make his own unique jutsu. Kakashi explains the principles behind harnessing one's elemental nature and adding it to his chakra in order to change it, citing Naruto's Rasengan as a good example of this phenomenon. As Naruto does not know what his nature is, Kakashi outlines the five basic natures that exist --Earth, Fire, Water, Wind, and Lightning. Naruto realizes that Sasuke Uchiha must have two natures because he is able to use both Fire and Lightning jutsu. Using a special litmus paper, Naruto discovers his nature is Wind. Yamato arrives and asks Naruto what his nature is and then demonstrates that his Wood style technique is a combination of Earth and Water type chakra. Kakashi tells Naruto that the ability to perfectly meld two natures together to create an entirely different nature is only possible with those possessing kekkei genkai, such as Haku with his Ice style. Kakashi tells Naruto that he plans on helping Naruto cut down his training time significantly by having him use shadow clones since a clone user is able to retain the memories and experiences of his clones after they are dispelled. Because Naruto possesses the Nine Tailed Fox's chakra, his reserves are much larger and he can thus not only make many more clones, but also maintain them for longer periods of time. Yamato reminds Naruto that depleting his own chakra would trigger the Nine Tails and so he has been requested by Kakashi to be present in order to suppress Naruto should that occur during their training. Naruto creates multiple shadow clones and Kakashi gives them all a leaf. He assigns them the task to slice it in half using wind chakra alone. Naruto is surprised when he almost immediately tears the leaf almost in half, and Kakashi remarks that perhaps their training will not take very long after all.
56	3	"Squirm"; Transliteration: "Ugomeku" (Japanese: うごめく)	Hiroshi Kimura	Yasuyuki Suzuki	April 24, 2008	November 17, 2010
While Naruto continues training with his Shadow Clones, Asuma informs him of advice about the Wind Element. Naruto successfully slices a leaf in half. He and his friends, before leaving the village, recognize Asuma as Konohamaru's uncle, the Third Hokage's son, and former member of the Guardian Shinobi Twelve. Meanwhile on a hill near a destroyed village, four cloaked enemies discuss the awakening of the Fire Country against the Leaf Village.
57	4	"Deprived of Eternal Sleep"; Transliteration: "Ubawareta nemuri" (Japanese: 奪われた永眠り)	Masaki Takano	Yasuyuki Suzuki	May 8, 2008	December 1, 2010
Naruto finds one of the four protected hidden tombs and fights with a training monk named Sora who uses wind chakra technique, before Sakura Haruno, Yamato, Sai and the other monks arrive. They arrive and Naruto recognizes the Fire Temple from his nightmare.
58	5	"Loneliness"; Transliteration: "Kodoku" (Japanese: 孤独)	Eitaro Ano	Yasuyuki Suzuki	May 8, 2008	December 8, 2010
The monks converse with the team about the four tombs holding dead members of the Guardian Shinobi Twelve, who protected the feudal lord of the Land of Fire before some attempted a coup. After seeing all monks training to spar, Naruto challenges Sora in taijutsu and hand-to-hand combat, but the monk stops the fight. At the cave, Sora practices Beast Wave Palm and tells Naruto that he will avenge his father. Then two monks see another tomb being robbed.
59	6	"A New Enemy"; Transliteration: "Aratana teki" (Japanese: 新たな敵)	Masaaki Kumagai	Junki Takegami	May 15, 2008	December 15, 2010
Tsunade suspects and orders an investigation about Danzo's plot. As Chiriku, Sora and the group failed to intercept four coffins, Fudō, Fuen and Fūka trap the group at the canyon in a maze of pits and traps, where Yamato and Sai encounter Fudō and Fuen.
60	7	"Impermanence"; Transliteration: "Uitenpen" (Japanese: 有為転変)	Kiyomu Fukuda	Junki Takegami	May 22, 2008	December 22, 2010
While Yamato fights with Fudō, Yamato is impossible to kill by Fudō due to his earth attack. Sai escapes from Fuen and saves Sakura from a giant spider. Later Naruto found Fūka, she decides to fight Naruto and attempts to kill with him with a Reaper Kiss. Sora independently confronts Furido, while the ANBU members spy on Danzo.
61	8	"Contact"; Transliteration: "Sesshoku" (Japanese: 接触)	Atsushi Nigorikawa	Yasuyuki Suzuki	May 29, 2008	December 29, 2010
Furido offers Sora sweet potatoes and tells him that he plans to use four corpses to save the Land of Fire. Naruto continues to fight Fuka but she manages to Kiss him the Reaper Kiss in order to kill Naruto and steal his chakra, but the power of the Nine Tailed Fox is too much for Fuka to handle so she is forced to push him away. At the same time Sakura, Sai and Yamato are reunited with Naruto. The monks arrive before Furido's Four-Man Team flee.
62	9	"Teammate"; Transliteration: "Chīmumeito" (Japanese: チームメイト)	Shigeharu Takahashi	Yasuyuki Suzuki	June 5, 2008	January 5, 2011
Back at the Leaf Village, Naruto uncomfortably spends time with Sora, who Yamato requests is made a temporary member of Team Kakashi while Sai recovers. That night while practicing chakra blades with Naruto, Asuma tells Sora that his father Kazuma died for honor after being part of a coup attempt by the hardline faction of the Guardian Shinobi Twelve. Furido's team declare war and begin the attack on the Kohaku Clan.
63	10	"The Two Kings"; Transliteration: "Futatsu no gyoku" (Japanese: 二つの玉(ぎょく))	Yuki Kinoshita	Masahiro Hikokubo	June 19, 2008	January 12, 2011
Asuma trains Naruto and Sora to use wind chakra. Tsunade and Yamato learn from Chiriku that Sora inadvertently destroyed the Temple of Fire 10 years ago, so was ostracised, similar to how Naruto always felt. Asuma gets Sora's black claw weapon upgraded to harness wind chakra, like his own blades. Asuma remembers how he killed Kazuma – Sora's father – who saw the Hokage as superfluous and believed power should be concentrated with the feudal lord. Furido informs Sora that Asuma was responsible for killing Kazuma, and gives him two "king" pieces from the game of Shogi, to pass onto Asuma (a reference to Asuma protecting both the Hokage and feudal lord). Sora furiously throws a chakra-powered kunai through a tree and destroys the stone behind it in the training grounds. Meanwhile, Tsunade is furious, learning that Danzo is gone.
64	11	"Jet Black Signal Fire"; Transliteration: "Shikkoku no noroshi" (Japanese: 漆黒の狼煙)	Hiroshi Kimura	Yasuyuki Suzuki	July 3, 2008	January 19, 2011
The ANBU members capture Danzo and a rain ninja spy. The village elders chastise Tsunade. Sora, spying on the meeting before being discovered, blames and attacks Asuma with his demonic arm. Naruto saves Sora from an unknown individual from the Root. Furido orders Sora to kill Tsunade and Asuma, for revenge. Furido says that Asuma sided with the Leaf Village's King, and that Two Kings means instability. That night after saving Tsunade, Naruto pursues Sora while a mysterious lightning storm strikes and cuts off power from the village.
65	12	"Lockdown of Darkness"; Transliteration: "Ankoku no sejō" (Japanese: 暗黒の施錠)	Shinji Satou	Masahiro Hikokubo	July 3, 2008	January 26, 2011
The villagers see Furido's Four-Man Team sealing the Leaf Village behind a barrier. Tsunade orders the village to be locked down on high alert. Konohamaru's team evacuate the villagers to safety. Asuma catches up with Sora and Naruto, and learns that Furido's team are planning to annihilate the village with the lightning powers of the stolen corpses. Asuma holds off the attackers, while they escape.
66	13	"Revived Souls"; Transliteration: "Yomigaeru tamashii" (Japanese: 黄泉がえる魂)	Eitaro Ano	Yasuyuki Suzuki	July 10, 2008	February 2, 2011
The team revived Seito, Tōu, Nauma and Kitane, while the leaf ninjas, including Genma and Ebisu, fight off the revived zombies of the Kohaku Clan. Asuma learns that they are using Limelight Jutsu, a special four-person lightning technique to destroy the village. Naruto and Yamato fight against Fuka and Fudo. Later, while Asuma is fighting Kitane, Furido informs Sora that he will destroy the village.
67	14	"Everyone's Struggle to the Death"; Transliteration: "Sorezore no shitō" (Japanese: それぞれの死闘)	Masaaki Kumagai	Yasuyuki Suzuki Masahiro Hikokubo	July 24, 2008	February 9, 2011
Furido attacks Sora after he opposes Furido's plan, and tells Sora that Kazuma had a similar flaw. Shikamaru enters the front line where the zombies are, and begins his strategy. Naruto continues fighting Fuka. Kitane traps Asuma with the electric force field, Sakura counters the illusions to defeat Fuen, and Yamato kills Fudo to remove all zombies from the village.
68	15	"Moment of Awakening"; Transliteration: "Mezame no toki" (Japanese: 覚醒(めざ)めの刻(とき))	Kiyomu Fukuda	Yasuyuki Suzuki	July 31, 2008	February 16, 2011
After declining forgiveness to Furido, Sora learns that the former gathered traces of the Nine-Tails's chakra following its attack on the Leaf Village 15 years ago (when the Fourth Hokage sealed the Nine-Tails into Naruto) and implanted them on Sora's body, making him a simulated Jinchuriki. Meanwhile, Naruto faints, then Fuka tries to kiss him to steal his chakra and kill him, but she fails because Naruto counters and uses the Rasengan to kill her. Asuma breaks free from the electric barrier and defeats Kitane. Because of this, Furido stops the reanimation of the others. Furido removes the seal containing Sora's power of the pseudo-Jinchuriki, as this is his plan B.
69	16	"Despair"; Transliteration: "Zetsubō" (Japanese: 絶望)	Masaki Takano	Masahiro Hikokubo	July 31, 2008	February 23, 2011
While Sora suffers with the demonic fox power as a synthetic Nine-Tailed Fox Jinchuriki, Asuma confronts Furido (Who is revealed to be Kazuma's Alter Ego). As Naruto and his friends arrive, they fail to restrain Sora who transforms into the Three-Tailed Fox version of the Nine-Tails cloak, despite Naruto's attempts at empathising with Sora.
70	17	"Resonance"; Transliteration: "Kyōmei" (Japanese: 共鳴)	Shigeharu Takahashi	Yasuyuki Suzuki	August 7, 2008	March 2, 2011
Choji, Kiba, Shikamaru, Lee, and Yamato all attempt to stop Sora. Furido and Asuma continue fighting. While Naruto manages to reason with Sora, Sora touches Naruto and their Nine-Tailed Fox chakra resonates. This causes Naruto's real Nine-Tails cloak to appear. Yamato tells Sakura that he cannot control Naruto and he himself must fight against the 9 tails mentally, which Naruto successfully does. Sora regains his own consciousness and manages to resist against the demonic fox power.
71	18	"My Friend"; Transliteration: "Tomo yo" (Japanese: 友よ)	Atsushi Nigorikawa	Yasuyuki Suzuki	August 14, 2008	March 9, 2011
Sora's body cannot sustain the Nine-Tails any longer, so it leaves him and enters Naruto's body as a new host. Naruto gets through to Sora, who is greeted by his friends from the Hidden Leaf Village. Meanwhile, a recovered Sai and Asuma kill Kazuma. The next day, Sora leaves the Leaf Village to travel around the world. Asuma and Shikamaru philosophically discuss the metaphorical "king" of the village, while Hidan and Kakuzu confront Yugito Nii: Jinchuriki of the Two-Tailed Cat.

== Home media release ==
=== Japanese ===
Volume	Date	Discs	Episodes	Reference
1	September 3, 2008	1	54–57	
2	October 1, 2008	1	58–61	
3	November 5, 2008	1	62–66	
4	December 3, 2008	1	67–71	

=== English ===
Viz Media (North America, Region 1)
Box set	Date	Discs	Episodes	Reference
5	January 25, 2011	3	54–65	
6	April 26, 2011	3	66–77	

Viz Media (North America, Region 1 Blu-ray sets)
Volume	Date	Discs	Episodes	Ref.
3	May 14, 2024	4	56–82	

Manga Entertainment (United Kingdom, Region 2)
Volume	Date	Discs	Episodes	Reference
5	May 16, 2011	2	53–65	
6	July 11, 2011	2	66–77	

Madman Entertainment (Australia/New Zealand, Region 4)
Collection	Date	Discs	Episodes	Reference
5	February 16, 2011	2	53–65	
6	July 20, 2011	2	66–77	
