= Go! (Joe Inoue song) =

Single by Joe Inoue

from the album Dos Angeles
- Released: July 22, 2009
- Genre: Rock, J-Pop
- Length: 11:06
- Label: Ki/oon Records
- Songwriter: Joe Inoue
- Producer: Joe Inoue

Joe Inoue singles chronology
"Maboroshi" (2009)	"Go!" (2009)	"Kaze no Gotoku" (2010)

"Go!" (GO★) is Japanese-American recording artist Joe Inoue's fourth single, and the first off of his second album Dos Angeles. Inoue worked with producer Mine-Chang on the single, which is described as an electro-pop tune.

== Track listing ==
1. "Go!" (GO★) – 3:39
2. "What Is Your Name?" – 3:52
3. "Jinkō Eisei" (人工衛星; "Artificial Satellite") – 3:37
4. "Go!(Burning Bright Remix)" (GO★Burning Bright Remix) – 3:39
