= Closer (Joe Inoue song) =

Single by Joe Inoue

from the album Me! Me! Me!
- Released: December 17, 2008
- Genre: Pop-punk
- Length: 13:43
- Label: Ki/oon Records
- Songwriter: Joe Inoue
- Producer: Joe Inoue

Joe Inoue singles chronology
"Hello!" (2008)	"Closer" (2008)	"Maboroshi" (2009)

"Closer" (stylized in all caps) is the second single by Japanese-American recording artist Joe Inoue. The song was used as one of the opening themes of Naruto: Shippuden. "Closer" is the most successful of Inoue's singles, peaking at 22 on the Oricon Weekly Singles Charts and remaining on the charts for seven weeks. Both the title track and "Gravity" are included on Me! Me! Me!.

Inoue later digitally released an English language cover of the title track on May 19, 2010. This version was later included as a bonus track on Dos Angeles.

A subsequent digital EP of the song was also released to the American iTunes Store on October 5, 2010. The EP includes the three variations of "Closer" from the original CD release as well as the English version.

== Track listing ==
1. "Closer" – 3:26
2. "Gravity" – 3:09
3. "Kangaetakunai (Can a Guy Talk All Night?) (考えたくない～Can a guy talk all night?～; "I Don't Wanna Think About It (Can a Guy Talk All Night?)") – 2:15
4. "Closer (Naruto Opening ver.)" (CLOSER -NARUTO オープニング ver.-, CLOSER -NARUTO Ōpuningu ver.-) – 1:30
5. "Closer ('Kerioki' ver.) (Karaoke)" (CLOSER -"ケリオキ"ver.-(KARAOKE)) – 3:26
