= Me! Me! Me! =

- Standard CD cover

Studio album by Joe Inoue
- Released: April 8, 2009
- Genre: Alternative rock, J-pop, post-hardcore, pop-punk
- Length: 42:06
- Label: Ki/oon

Joe Inoue chronology
| In a Way (2007) | Me! Me! Me! (2009) | Dos Angeles (2010) |

Singles from Me! Me! Me!
- 1. "Hello!" Released: July 16, 2008; 2. "Closer" Released: December 17, 2008; 3. "Maboroshi" Released: February 18, 2009

Me! Me! Me! is the first full-length album by Japanese-American recording artist Joe Inoue, originally released as a standard release and a limited edition release containing a DVD of music videos on April 8, 2009. Me! Me! Me! peaked at number 86 on the Oricon Weekly Album Charts, remaining on the charts for only one week. As with all of Inoue's music, he mixes, arranges, and performs on every track.

== Track listing ==
All songs are written, composed, and performed by Joe Inoue.

1. "Closer (Royal Ver.)" – 3:24
2. "Reiji (Twenty Four)" (零時～TWENTY FOUR～, "Midnight (Twenty Four)") – 2:32
3. "Maboroshi (Illusion)" – 4:39
4. "Party Night (Odoritari Night)" – 2:48
5. "Into Oblivion" – 3:06
6. "One Man Band (Symphonicated Ver.)" – 3:35
7. "Hitomi (He Told Me)" (瞳～HE TOLD ME～, "Eyes (He Told Me)") – 3:11
8. "Hannah" – 3:26
9. "Gravity (Sunset Ver.)" – 3:06
10. "Kuruma" (車, "Car") – 2:51
11. "Afterglow" – 2:40
12. "Haru" (春, "Spring") – 3:09
13. "Hello! (Album Mix)" – 3:45
14. "Walking After You" (Acoustic)"

=== Limited edition DVD ===
1. "Nowhere" (Music Video)
2. "Hummingbird" (Music Video)
3. "Hello!" (Music Video)
4. "Closer" (Music Video)
5. "Maboroshi" (Music Video)
6. Inoue Joe Artist Documentary
7. Joe TV with Music Videos
