= Dos Angeles =

- Standard CD cover

Studio album by Joe Inoue
- Released: October 6, 2010
- Genre: Post-hardcore; pop-punk; j-pop
- Length: 34:57
- Label: Ki/oon Records

Joe Inoue chronology
Me! Me! Me! (2009)	Dos Angeles (2010)	Tenguboy (2013)

Alternative cover
- CD+DVD version cover

Singles from Dos Angeles
- 1. "Go!" Released: July 22, 2009; 2. "Kaze no Gotoku" Released: August 4, 2010

Dos Angeles is Japanese-American recording artist Joe Inoue's second full-length album, originally released as a standard and limited edition release on October 6, 2010. It peaked at 136 on the Oricon Weekly Album Charts, remaining on the charts for only one week.

The title of the album is a reference to Inoue's home town of Los Angeles, California, as well as symbolizing that it is his second album ("Dos" being the Spanish word for "two").

== Track listing ==
All songs are written, composed, and performed by Joe Inoue.

1. "Can you hear me?" – 1:27
2. "Kaze no Gotoku (B.B.B. ver.) (風のごとく -B.B.B. ver.-) – 3:40
3. "Home" – 3:58
4. "Futari de Hitori/The Journey" (ふたりでひとり / The Journey, "Two in One/The Journey") – 4:44
5. "Animal feat. Yoko Yazawa" – 4:16
6. "Kimigokoro" (キミゴコロ, "Your Heart") – 3:27
7. "Lights (Album ver.)" – 4:04
8. "Go! (Album ver.)" – 3:39
9. "Closer (English ver.)" – 3:29
10. "Hello Hello Goodbye" (ハロハログッバイ, Haro Haro Gubbai) – 2:21

=== Limited edition DVD ===
1. "Kaze no Gotoku" (Music Video)
2. "Go!" (Music Video)
3. "Home" (Music Video)
4. "Valentine's Day Special Acoustic Live"
5. Making of "Home"
