= Totalfat =

Japanese punk band

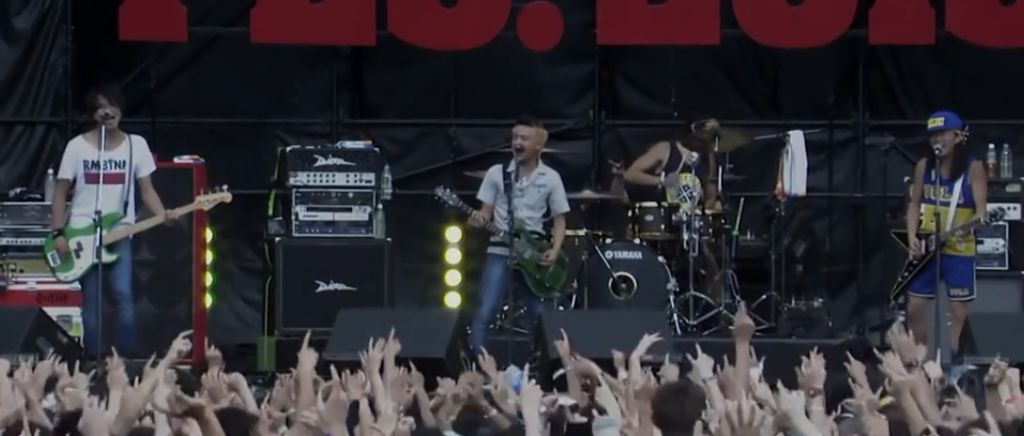
- Totalfat performing in 2013

Background information
- Origin: Hachiōji, Tokyo, Japan
- Genres: Punk rock; melodic hardcore; skate punk; pop punk; alternative rock
- Years active: 1999–present
- Labels: Catch All; ChAoS; Ki/oon; RX(2015–present)
- Members: José; Bunta; Shun
- Past members: Toshi; Yasushi; Kuboty
- Website: https://www.totalfat.net

Totalfat (stylized as TOTALFAT) is a Japanese melodic punk rock band formed in 1999. Totalfat consists of vocalist/guitarist José (ホセ, Hose), vocalist/bassist Shun, and drummer Bunta.

== Background ==
Totalfat started out playing NOFX songs in 2000. Their shows were mainly songs of Ten Foot Pole, Millencolin and Slick Shoes. In 2003, Totalfat released their first album entitled End of Introduction, from Japanese independent label Catch All Records. They embarked on a CD release Japan tour which included 41 shows. The first album sold 3,500 copies. In 2004, Totalfat released an EP entitled Get It Better from Catch All Records. Then, they had a CD release tour which included 48 shows around Japan. The EP sold about 3,000 copies. They also play plenty of festivals in Japan, such as Rock in Japan, Punk Spring, and always support Summer Sonic Festival from 2009 to present. Their major label debut was the album Overdrive.

"Place to Try" was the nineteenth ending song for Naruto Shippuden. The song lasted for 11 episodes starting at episode 231.

In April 2019, Totalfat announced via their website a concert on October 22, 2019, which will be the last one with Kuboty. The band will remain a three piece from there on.

== Band members ==
Current members

- José – lead vocals, rhythm guitar (1999–present)
- Shun – vocals, bass (1999–present)
- Bunta – drums (1999–present)

Former members

- Toshi – lead guitar (1999–2000)
- Yasushi – lead guitar (2000–2005)
- Kuboty – lead guitar (2004–2019)

Timeline

== Discography ==
=== Studio albums ===
Year	Album details	Oricon chart
2003	End of Introduction: Released: November 19, 2003	—
2008	All the Dreamer, Light the Dream: Released: April 2, 2008	92
2009	For Whom the Rock Rolls: Released: May 20, 2009	51
2010	Overdrive: Released: June 9, 2010	40
2011	Damn Hero: Released: May 25, 2011	27
2012	Wicked and Naked: Released: July 4, 2012	28
2015	Come Together, Sing With Us: Released: July 1, 2015	17
2017	Fat: Released: April 26, 2017	28
2018	Conscious+Practice: Released: October 3, 2018	31
2020	Milestone: Released: January 22, 2020	35
2024	PURE 40: Released: March 23, 2024	-
2025	Futures In Silhoute: Released: July 31, 2025	-

=== Mini albums ===
Year	Album details	Oricon chart
2005	Get It Better: Released: March 2, 2005	—
2007	Hard Rock Reviver: Released: January 11, 2007	—
2007	Hello & Goodnight: Released: April 25, 2007	195
2013	Seven Lives: Released: July 31, 2013	25

=== Compilation albums ===
Year	Album details	Oricon chart
2013	The Best Fat Collection: Released: December 11, 2013	32

=== Singles ===
Year	Title	Oricon chart
2011	"World of Glory" (with Joe Inoue): Released: May 4, 2011	73
2011	"Place to Try": Released: November 9, 2011	31
2012	"Good Bye, Good Luck": Released: January 18, 2012	49
2012	"Party Party": Released: April 25, 2012	73
2014	"Natsu no Tokage" (夏のトカゲ Summer Lizard): Released: July 30, 2014	43
2015	"Utage no Aizu" (宴の合図 Signs of the Party): Released: October 7, 2015	44

=== DVDs ===
Year	Title	Oricon chart
2013	Fat Alive 1: Released: July 31, 2013	25
