= In a Way =

EP by Joe Inoue
- Released: September 19, 2007
- Genre: Rock, J-pop
- Length: 17:23
- Label: Ki/oon Records
- Producer: J. Inoue

Joe Inoue chronology
In a Way (2007)	Me! Me! Me! (2009)

In a Way (stylized as IN A WAY) is the debut mini-album by Japanese-American recording artist Joe Inoue, originally released on September 19, 2007. The album only stayed on the Oricon Weekly Album Charts for one week, peaking at number 220.

== Track listing ==
All songs are written, composed, and performed by Joe Inoue.

1. "Nowhere" – 3:45
2. "Kakusei" (覚醒, "Wide Awake") – 3:26
3. "Pa! Pa! Pa!" (パッパッパ, Pappappa) – 3:22
4. "Shinkai" (深海, "Deep Sea") – 3:32
5. "Hummingbird" (ハミングバード, Hamingubādo) – 3:22
