= Naruto Shippuden the Movie: Bonds =

2008 Japanese anime film

- North American box art, showing Naruto (above) and Sasuke (below)
- Directed by: Hajime Kamegaki
- Written by: Junki Takegami
- Produced by: Mikihiko Fukazawa; Shoji Matsui
- Starring: Junko Takeuchi; Noriaki Sugiyama; Motoko Kumai; Unshō Ishizuka
- Cinematography: Atsuho Matsumoto
- Edited by: Yukie Oikawa; Seiji Morita
- Music by: Yasuharu Takanashi; Yaiba
- Production company: Studio Pierrot
- Distributed by: Toho
- Release date: August 2, 2008
- Running time: 93 minutes
- Country: Japan
- Language: Japanese
- Box office: ¥1.16 billion (US$10.6 million)

Naruto Shippuden the Movie: Bonds (Japanese: 劇場版 NARUTO(ナルト) 疾風伝 絆, Hepburn: Gekijō-ban Naruto Shippūden Kizuna) is a 2008 Japanese animated martial arts fantasy film based on Masashi Kishimoto's manga and anime series. Released on August 2, 2008, it was announced in Weekly Shōnen Jump along with the DVD release date for the first Naruto: Shippuden film. The trailer for the second film aired with episodes 40 and 41, and again with episode 66 and 67. In episodes 70 and 73 the opening sequence was replaced with footage from the film. Its English version was released on DVD and Blu-ray on October 25, 2011, in North America. The film's theme song "No Rain No Rainbow" is performed by Home Made Kazoku. The movie is set after the episode 71 of the Naruto: Shippuden anime series.

== Plot ==
Enemy ninjas from the Land of the Sky arrive in Konoha and quickly set about attacking the village by committing an act of vengeance for the Leaf Village's devastating attack on the Sky Country during the Second Great Ninja World War.

While Naruto Uzumaki, Sakura Haruno and Hinata Hyuga escort Amaru and Doctor Shinnō to Amaru's village, Sai and Shino Aburame destroy the sky ninja's ship base. Orochimaru, now suffering from expired body, orders Sasuke Uchiha to get a man who can help Orochimaru perfect Orochimaru's reincarnation. At the now burning village, Amaru searches for the villagers, with a trap seemingly killing Shinnō. After Amaru recovers herself and senses, the remaining allies continue trying to find the missing villagers.

After Hinata is separated from the team, Amaru is possessed by the Zero-Tailed monster, Reibi. Naruto nearly transforms into a Four-Tailed Fox state, but the seal suppresses the Nine-Tailed Fox's chakra within Naruto. Naruto helps Amaru resists the power of Reibi. At the floating fortress Ancor Vantian, Naruto learns that the recovered Shinnō had betrayed everyone, using Amaru to research the power of darkness fifteen years ago, as well as the village's secret scroll. After Shinnō temporarily activates Body Revival Technique, Naruto stops Amaru from committing suicide.

After a brief fight, Naruto powers up Rasengan to finish off Shinnō. Sasuke appears and intervenes, telling the weakened Shinnō to help Orochimaru, but Shinnō refuses, giving the reincarnation Jutsu scroll to Sasuke before falling into a trap door. Naruto and Sasuke confront Shinnō, revealing the giant cocoon to be the Zero-Tails and transforming into a chakra-absorbing monster. After Sasuke releases the curse mark and Naruto releases the fox's chakra, Shinnō is overloaded with chakra. Shinnō is destroyed with Chidori by Sasuke and Tornado Rasengan by Naruto. Amaru saves the captured villagers and Hinata. With the fortress no longer having power, Ancor Vantian falls. While several leaf ninjas attempt to infiltrate and destroy the fortress, Amaru, Hinata and the freed villagers prepare to leave.

After Naruto destroys the remaining fortress with the Rasengan (螺旋丸, lit. spiral sphere, English manga: "Spiral Chakra Sphere") and falls through the sky, Amaru rides on the glider to save Naruto. Naruto and Amaru then land safely on Gamabunta.

Returning to the hideout and giving the scroll to Orochimaru, Sasuke continues training, reflecting on Naruto's last words to Sasuke.

== Voice cast ==
Character	Japanese Voice	English Voice
Naruto Uzumaki	Junko Takeuchi	Maile Flanagan
Sasuke Uchiha	Noriaki Sugiyama	Yuri Lowenthal
Sakura Haruno	Chie Nakamura	Kate Higgins
Kakashi Hatake	Kazuhiko Inoue	Dave Wittenberg
Sai	Satoshi Hino	Ben Diskin
Neji Hyuga	Kōichi Tōchika	Steve Staley
Shino Aburame	Shinji Kawada	Derek Stephen Prince
Hinata Hyuga	Nana Mizuki	Stephanie Sheh
Shikamaru Nara	Showtaro Morikubo	Tom Gibis
Choji Akimichi	Kentarō Itō	Robbie Rist
Tsunade	Masako Katsuki	Debi Mae West
Shizune	Keiko Nemoto	Megan Hollingshead
Jiraiya	Hōchū Ōtsuka	David Lodge
Orochimaru	Kujira	Steve Blum
Kabuto Yakushi	Nobutoshi Canna	Henry Dittman
Yamato	Rikiya Koyama	Troy Baker
Amaru	Motoko Kumai	Michelle Ruff
Doctor Shinno	Unshō Ishizuka	Jamieson Price
