= Ayumikurikamaki =

Japanese idol group

- Origin: Japan
- Genres: Japanese idol
- Years active: 2012-2021
- Labels: id; DefSTAR; SME
- Members: Kurika; Maki; Ayumi
- Website: ayumikurikamaki.com

Ayumikurikamaki (あゆみくりかまき, stylized as "AYUMIKURIKAMAKI" or "AyumiKurikaMaki") are a Japanese idol group. It consists of singer "Ayumi", DJ "Kurika" and hype-woman "Maki". The three girls are managed by Id Entertainment agency.

== History ==
=== 2012: Origins and formation ===
Kurika and Maki met as high-school classmates in Kobe prefecture, and started out as a DJ unit Kurikamaki (くりかまき) in January, 2012. Since the Japanese abbreviation of their name makes the word "kuma", which means bear in Japanese, they dress up in bear costumes and claim to be 3-year-old bears. They posted their DJ performance on Niconico, which caught the management agency's attention. They officially started their activity in November 2012, performing as an opening DJ in over 20 events a month.

=== 2013-2014: Indie kuma era ===
They released their first CD single "アナログマガール" (Analoguma-girl) on August 21, 2013, ranking 136 in Oricon weekly chart. They released their second CD single "クマトナデシコ" (Kumatonadeshiko) on March 21, 2014, ranking 41 in the Oricon weekly chart. One of the CD's B-side tracks, ”春色ディスカバリー feat. ともだち” (Seishun Discovery featuring Tomodachi), featured Ayumi, a girl in the same management agency. Her singing caught Kurikamaki's attention, and they claim to have persuaded her to join their group for over 5 months. On May 5, 2014, Ayumi officially joined Kurikamaki, and the group's name was changed to Ayumikurikamaki, which is frequently abbreviated as Ayukuma. On July 22, 2014, they released their first CD single as Ayumikurikamaki "ジェットクマスター" (Jet kumastar) on July 22, 2014, ranking 23 in the Oricon weekly chart.

=== 2015-7/2016: Major kuma era ===
They debuted on a major record label with the single "鮭鮭鮭" ("Shakeh Shakeh Shakeh", which translates to "Salmon Salmon Salmon") on March 4, 2015, ranking 11 in the Oricon Singles Chart. They released their second major single "蜜蜜蜜" (Honey Honey Honey) on June 24, 2015. It reached number 9 on the Oricon chart, and it was their first single to rank in Oricon weekly chart's top 10. It was also an ending theme for the anime Punch Line. They released their third major single "心友フォーエヴァー" ("Shin-yuu Forever", which roughly means "Best Friend Forever") on November 25, 2015, ranking 17 in the Oricon Singles Chart.

On December 27, 2015, the members got involved in a car accident. The vehicle they were in rolled over due to a tire burst, leaving them with sprains and bruises bad enough to cancel several planned live events. However, they successfully restarted their activity with a live concert on January 31, 2016.

They released their first album "あゆみくりかまきがやって来る！クマァ！クマァ！クマァ！" (Ayumikurikamaki ga yattekuru! Kuma! Kuma! Kuma!) on April 13, 2016. Its title and art were inspired from The Beatles. It ranked 8 in the Oricon Albums Chart.

On May 12, 2016, the group announced that they can continue to perform as bears only until their solo live concert on July 8, 2016, after which they must perform as humans. They also announced that they can return to being bears only if they can announce until the end of 2017 a solo live concert at Nippon Budokan.

=== 7/2016-present: Major human era ===
On November 23, 2016, they released their fourth major single "旅立ちの唄" ("Tabidachi-no-Uta", which roughly means "Song of Departure"). It was their first release as humans, and ranked 27 in the Oricon Singles Chart.

== Live performance ==
Ayumikurikamaki's solo live concerts consist of a DJ part where they mix recorded music for an audience, and a second part where they perform their original songs. They sing "I Met A Bear" only in live concerts, and circle pit is sometimes formed. They announce beforehand the type of cheering to be done in the next concert: TTD, a moderate cheering, and DIM, an aggressive cheering. TTD stands for "To Tokyo Dome", and is mainly for a free live and in-store events where they want to attract new fans. DIM stands for "Donna Idol nimo Makenaizo", and is for their solo concerts, as well as idol and subcultural events.

== Original terminology and cheering ==
Matagi: They call their fans matagi, which means animal hunter in Japanese. It is sometimes abbreviated to MTG.
Nikukyuu Kecak: Raising both hands with all fingers bent at second joints. Nikukyuu means paw in Japanese.
Analoguma-tonton: Jumping with a hand raised diagonally that occurs during a performance of Analoguma-girl.

== Discography ==
=== CD singles ===
Release date	Label	Title	Group	Track listing	Peak ORICON weekly ranking
8/21/2013	id	アナログマガール (Analoguma-girl)	Kurikamaki	1. アナログマガール; (Analoguma-girl); 2. HELLO!! 3.Chap Chap	136
3/12/2014	id	クマトナデシコ (Kumatonadeshiko)	Kurikamaki	1. クマトナデシコ; (Kumatonadeshiko); 2. 春色ディスカバリー feat.ともだち (Seishun Discovery featuring Tomodachi); 3. My Sweet Darlin’	41
7/22/2014	id	ジェットクマスター (Jet kumastar)	Ayumikurikamaki	1. ジェットクマスター; (Jet kumastar); 2. ナキムシヒーロー (Nakimushi hero); 3. 恋のダイヤル6700 (Koi no dial 6700)	23
3/4/2015	DefSTAR	鮭鮭鮭 (Shake Shake Shake)	Ayumikurikamaki	1. 鮭鮭鮭; (Shake Shake Shake); 2. キミノモトヘ (Kiminomotoe); 3. 自分革命 (Jibunkakumei)	11
6/24/2015	DefSTAR	蜜蜜蜜 (Honey Honey Honey)	Ayumikurikamaki	1. 蜜蜜蜜; (Honey Honey Honey); 2. KILLLA TUNE; 3. アイノウタ (Ainouta)	9
11/25/2015	SME	心友フォーエヴァー (Shin-yuu Forever)	Ayumikurikamaki	1. 心友フォーエヴァー; (Shin-yuu Forever); 2. 森森森 (Mori Mori Mori); 3. 素敵な世界 (Suteki na Sekai)	17
11/23/2016	SME	旅立ちの唄 (Tabidachi-no-Uta)	Ayumikurikamaki	1. 旅立ちの唄; (Tabidachi-no-Uta); 2. 弾進GOOD!!! (DancinGOOD!!!); 3. SUGOROKU	27

=== CD albums ===
Release date	Label	Title	Group	Track listing	Peak ORICON weekly ranking
4/13/2016	SME	あゆみくりかまきがやって来る!クマァ!クマァ!クマァ! (Ayumikurikamaki ga yattekuru! Kuma! Kuma! Kuma!)	Ayumikurikamaki	1. スターライトジャンボリー; (Starlight Jamboree); 2. WAR CRY; 3. ジェットクマスター (Jet kumastar); 4. 蜜蜜蜜 (Honey Honey Honey); 5. 心友フォーエヴァー (Shin-yuu Forever); 6. KILLLA TUNE; 7. What's my name?: 8. アイノウタ; (Ainouta); 9. 森森森 (Mori Mori Mori); 10. 鮭鮭鮭 (Shake Shake Shake); 11. 自分革命 (Jibunkakumei); 12. ナキムシヒーロー (Nakimushi hero)	8
