= Little by Little (band) =

Japanese pop rock band

- Origin: Japan
- Genres: Pop rock
- Years active: 2000–2010
- Labels: Sony Music Entertainment Japan; Stardust Promotion
- Members: Hideco; Tetsuhiko

Little by Little (stylized as little by little) was a Japanese pop rock band, consisting of vocalist Hideco and Tetsuhiko. little by little's record label is Sony Music Entertainment Japan and they are attached to Stardust Promotion. They are known mainly for their contributions to anime, including "Kanashimi wo Yasashisa ni" (悲しみをやさしさに), the opening theme for the third season of Naruto, "Love & Peace", the second opening theme to Superior Defender Gundam Force, "Hummingbird", a closing theme for Yakitate!! Japan, and "Kimi Monogatari" (キミモノガタリ), the third closing theme of Naruto: Shippūden.

== Member Profiles ==
- Hideco (ヒデコ, Hideko; Real name: Eiko Satō (佐藤 英子 Satō Eiko)), vocals.
- Tetsuhiko (テツヒコ, Tetsuhiko; Real name: Tetsuhiko Suzuki (鈴木 哲彦 Suzuki Tetsuhiko), born July 31, 1968), composition.

== Discography ==
=== Albums ===
- Sweet Noodle Pop (July 20, 2005)

=== Singles ===
# - Single	Title	Date
1st	Kanashimi wo Yasashisa ni (悲しみをやさしさに, "Sadness into kindness") (3rd Opening to Naruto) 1."Kanashimi wo Yasashisa ni" 2."Ireland fortune market" 3."home town": 4. "Kanashimi wo Yasashisa ni Naruto Opening Mix" (悲しみをやさしさに NARUTO -ナルト- Opening MIX)	December 17, 2003
2nd	Love & Peace (Used as the second opening to SD Gundam Force) 1."Love & Peace" 2."Puzzle" 3."Astrodog" (アストロドッグ, Asutorodoggu) 4."Love & Peace (Instrumental)"	April 14, 2004
3rd	Ameagari no Kyūna Sakamachi (雨上がりの急な坂道, "A steep slope after the rain") (Used as the theme song to the drama 大好き！五つ子6 (Daisuki! Itsutsu ko 6) 1."Ameagari no Kyūna Sakamachi" 2."Hubble" (ハッブル Habburu) 3."Ninja Kids": 4. "Ameagari no Kyūna Sakamachi Instrumental (雨上がりの急な坂道 -instrumental-)	August 11, 2004
4th	Synchro (シンクロ, Shinkuro)(Used as the theme song of the film 恋は五・七・五！ (Koi wa go-shichi-go!)) 1."Synchro" 2."Namae no Nai Kyō" (名前のない今日, "Today without a name") 3."Synchro Instrumental" (シンクロ -instrumental-)	April 20, 2005
5th	Hummingbird (ハミングバード, Hamingubādo) (Used as the ending theme of Yakitate!! Japan) 1."Hummingbird" 2."Lonely Survivor" 3."Hummingbird Instrumental" (ハミングバード -instrumental-)	June 8, 2005
6th	Kimi Monogatari (キミモノガタリ, "Your story") (Third ending theme of Naruto: Shippūden) 1."キミモノガタリ" 2."Potato and Coke" (ポテトとコーク Poteto to kōku,) 3."Eden" 4."Kimi Monogatari Instrumental" (キミモノガタリ -Instrumental-)	December 5, 2007
7th	Pray 1."Pray" 2."Re:birth Day": 3. "Japanese Compact Girl 148" (ジャパニーズコンパクトガール148 "Japanīzu Konpakuto Gāru148); 4."Pray -Instrumental-"	May 28, 2008
