= Long Shot Party =

Japanese music group

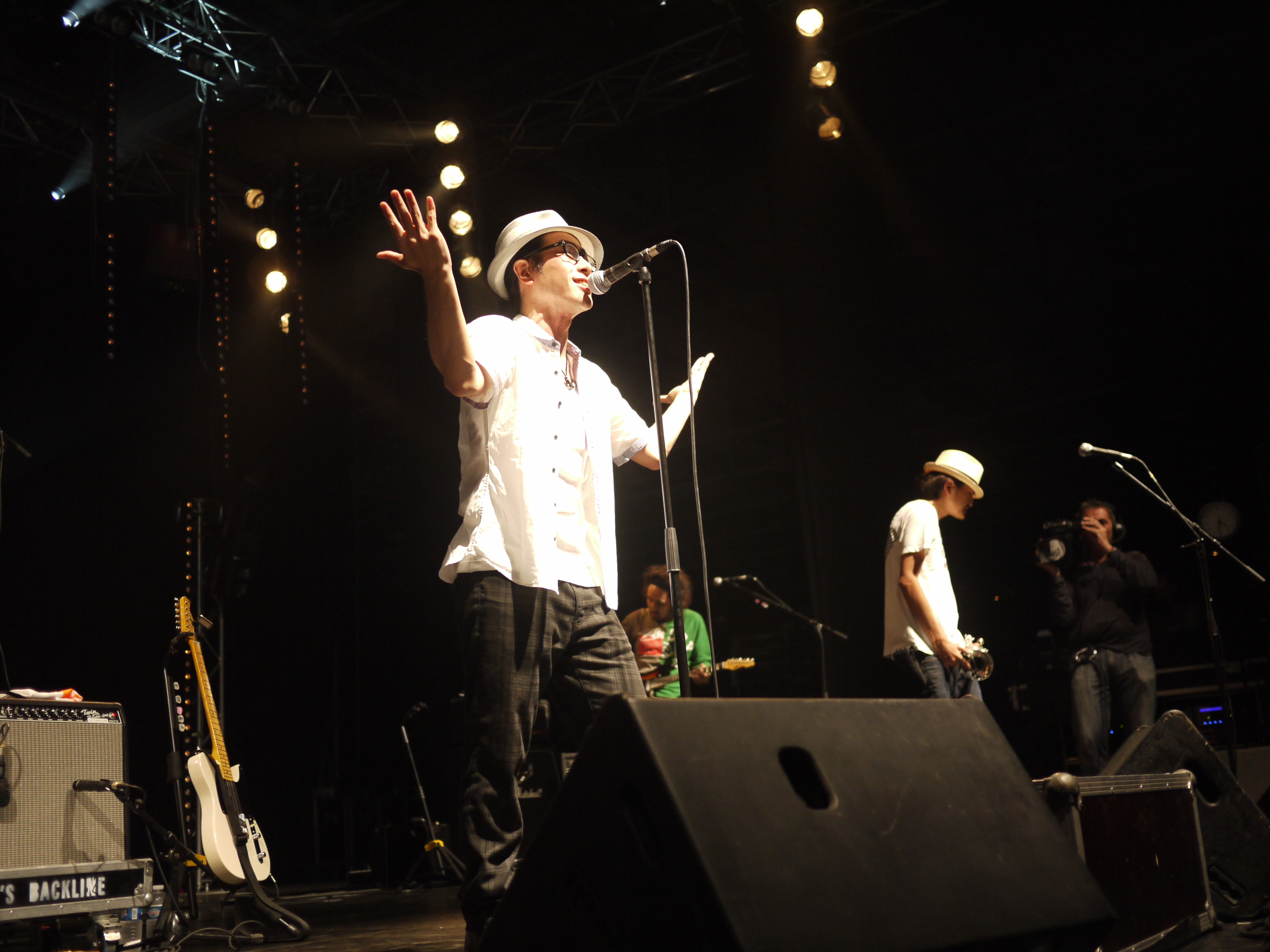
- The Band's performance at 2010 Japan Expo in Paris

Background information
- Origin: Sendai, Japan
- Genres: Ska; pop rock
- Years active: 1998–2010
- Labels: DefSTAR
- Past members: Sasaji; Shuichi; Saitaro; Ken Iikawa; KJ; PxOxN

Long Shot Party (often stylized as LONG SHOT PARTY) was a Japanese six-piece ska band, formed in Sendai, 1998. They released their first mini-album titled Making Ourself Understood in our Sounds in January 2000. And then, in October 2002, their first full album Delta Force released on the Indie Label.

In October 2007, they signed with a major label, DefSTAR Records, and released their first major single, "Distance", in January 2008, which was used as the second opening theme for the anime series Naruto Shippuden. Their single "Ano Hi Time Machine" was an opening theme of the anime television series Zoku Natsume Yūjinchō. The band announced their disbandment in December 2010.

== Discography ==
=== Singles ===
Information	Oricon peak
"Walkin' on the country road": Released: February 13, 2001; Format: CD5	-
"Swear": Released: March 13, 2002; Format: CD5"	69
"distance": Released: January 23, 2008; Format: CD5"	25
"My Way" (マイウェイ): Released: May 14, 2008; Format: CD5"	–
"Time Machine to That Day" (あの日タイムマシン, Ano hi Time Machine): Released: January 28, 2009; Format: CD5"	38
"Heart Beat" (ハートビート, Hāto Bīto): Released: August 5, 2009; Format: CD5"	158

=== Albums ===
Information	Oricon peak
Making Ourself Understood in our Sounds: Released: January, 2000; Format: CD5"	–
Delta Force: Released: October, 2001; Format: CD5"	43
sonic: Released: August, 2002; Format: CD5"	80
Razzoodock: Released: November, 2004; Format: CD5"	–
Gardens 13h: Released: April, 2005; Format: CD5"	–
Pointirhythm: Released: September, 2006; Format: CD5"	294
Long Shot Party: Released: July, 2010; Format: CD5"	-
