= Joe Inoue =

Joe Inoue 井上ジョー
- Born: August 30, 1985 (age 40); Los Angeles, California, U.S.
- Genres: Alternative rock; electronic; j-pop
- Occupation: Singer-songwriter
- Instruments: Vocals; guitar; drums; bass; piano; ukulele; synthesizer
- Years active: 2007–present
- Label: Ki/oon Records
- Website: joeinoue.com

Joe Inoue (井上ジョー, Inoue Jō; born August 30, 1985) is a Japanese-American rock musician signed to Sony Music Entertainment Japan's Ki/oon Records label.

== Background and career ==
He was born and raised in Los Angeles, California, to two Japanese immigrants. It was not until middle school that he became interested in music and that eventually led him to start his musical career in 2007. He was accepted to UCLA and UC Berkeley but had chosen music. Inoue performs every instrument on his recordings in addition to writing and composing the pieces on his own. He claims to have learned Japanese by reading manga and watching anime.

He gained prominence when his song "Closer" was used as the fourth opening theme for Naruto: Shippuden. His fifth single "Kaze no Gotoku" was used as the second theme song for the Yorinuki Gin Tama-san anime.

Inoue contributed to Tetsuya's 2011 solo album Come On! by rapping on the track "Eden" and later wrote and was featured on Totalfat's 2011 single "World of Glory".

== Discography ==
- In a Way (2007)
- Me! Me! Me! (2009)
- Dos Angeles (2010)
- JOEpop #1 (2016)
- JOEpop #2 (2016)
- Polyglot Musix #1 (2016)
- Hats On! Tunes (2017)
- Jiwa Jiwa LP (2018)

EP's

- The Wish That Never Came True (2020)
- Hip Hop Collection (2021)

== Songwriting contributions ==
- "Eden" by Tetsuya from the album Come On! – rap
- "World of Glory" by Totalfat from the album Damn Hero – songwriting
- "Adrenaline" by Yoko Yazawa from the album Give Me!!! – songwriting
- "Spinning World" from Naruto: Shippuden – songwriting
- "Rescue Rescue" by Kanjani 8 – songwriting
- "Chan-Chara-Chan" by Shiritsu Ebisu Chugaku – songwriting
- "Hankō Seimei" by Ayumikurikamaki from the album Dai Gyakushū – songwriting, credited as Tenguboy
- "Amagami Days" by Ayumikurikamaki from the album Dai Gyakushū – songwriting, credited as Tenguboy
- "Elevator Girl" (English ver.) by Babymetal from the album Metal Galaxy – lyrics, credited as Joemetal
