= Digimon Tamers =

2001 Japanese television anime

- デジモンテイマーズ
- Genre: Adventure, fantasy
- Created by: Akiyoshi Hongo
- Developed by: Chiaki J. Konaka
- Directed by: Yukio Kaizawa
- Music by: Takanori Arisawa
- Country of origin: Japan
- Original language: Japanese
- No. of episodes: 51 (list of episodes)

Production
- Producers: Hiromi Seki; Kyotaro Kimura
- Production companies: Fuji Television; Yomiko Advertising; Toei Animation

Original release
- Network: Fuji Television
- Release: April 1, 2001 – March 31, 2002

Related
- Manga
- Written by: Yu Yuen-wong
- Published by: Rightman Publishing
- English publisher: NA: Tokyopop; SEA: Chuang Yi
- Original run: April 2004 – October 2004
- Volumes: 4
- Film
- Digimon Tamers: Battle of Adventurers (2001); Digimon Tamers: Runaway Locomon (2002)
- Digimon franchise
- Digimon Adventure; Digimon Adventure 02; Digimon Adventure tri.; Digimon Tamers; Digimon Frontier; Digimon Data Squad (Savers); Digimon Fusion (Xros Wars); Digimon Universe: App Monsters; Digimon Adventure (2020); Digimon Ghost Game; Digimon Beatbreak

Digimon Tamers (Japanese: デジモンテイマーズ, Hepburn: Dejimon Teimāzu) is a Japanese anime television series and the third television series in the Digimon franchise, produced by Toei Animation. The series takes place in a new setting separate from the preceding series, Digimon Adventure and Digimon Adventure 02, where the characters utilize cards from the collectible card games. The series aired in Japan from April 2001 to March 2002.

The series was originally licensed in North America by Saban Entertainment, aired in the US from September 2001 to June 2002 as the third season of Digimon: Digital Monsters. A Hong Kong manhua adaptation of the series, by Yu Yuen-wong, was serialized from April to October 2004.

== Plot ==
Takato Matsuki, a fan of the Digimon card game, finds a Blue Card, which transforms his card reader into a D-Power Digivice. (Note: A D-Power (ディーアーク, Dī Āku; D-Ark) is a type of Digivice that allows a Digimon to Digivolve and includes a card reader.) His original Digimon creation, Guilmon, materializes into real life when his D-Power scans his drawings. Takato meets Henry Wong and Rika Nonaka, two other children who are partnered with Terriermon and Renamon respectively, as well as Calumon and Impmon. As wild Digimon begin roaming Shinjuku, the Tamers defeat them and defend the city. Using their D-Powers, the Tamers can enhance their Digimon partners by scanning cards to Digi-modify (Note: Digi-modification (カードスラッシュ, Kādo Surasshu; Card Slash) is the process by which a Tamer scans a card through a D-Power that allows a Digimon to access better battle abilities or Digivolution.) or help their partners Digivolve. (Note: Digivolution (進化, Shinka; Evolution) is the process by which a Digimon evolves into a higher-leveled, more powerful form.) After each Digimon is defeated, their Digimon obtains their data. Meanwhile, Hypnos, an intelligence agency led by Mitsuo Yamaki, has been capturing the Digimon and sending them back to the Digital World.

Yamaki's obsessive efforts to exterminate the Digimon brings the Devas, twelve extremely powerful Digimon, into the Real World. Henry's father, Janyu Wong, and his friends, the Monster Makers, are revealed to be responsible for creating the prototype digital forms that eventually evolved into Digimon. The Bio-Emergence of the enormous pig Deva, Vikaralamon, reveals the existence of Digimon to the general public and result in Calumon being captured and taken back to the Digital World. In hopes of saving Calumon, the Tamers enter the Digital World, with a remorseful Yamaki as their ally in the Real World. Impmon turns his back on the Tamers when he encounters the dog Deva Caturamon, and wishes to become strong, thus becoming Beelzemon. The Tamers confront Beelzemon, and Beelzemon kills Leomon, causing his partner Jeri Kato to fall into depression. After resolving conflicts with the Digimon Sovereigns, the Tamers learn that the Digimon are protecting themselves from humans and the Real World because the D-Reaper, a rogue clean-up program, has been destroying the Digital World.

As the Tamers return to the Real World, the D-Reaper kidnaps Jeri, manipulating and trapping her inside its body. The D-Reaper begins to materialize in the Real World and the Tamers fight back, with Yamaki assembling the Monster Makers to assist them. The Monster Makers develop a program targeting the D-Reaper's core programming, allowing the Tamers to defeat the D-Reaper and save Jeri. With both worlds restored, the Tamers discover the effects of the Monster Makers' program also have impacted the Digimon. The Tamers say goodbye to their Digimon partners as they forced to return to the Digital World. Some time later, Takato discovers a portal to the Digital World in Guilmon's old hideout in the park.

== Characters ==
=== Tamers ===
Takato Matsuki (松田 啓人, Matsuda Takato)
Voiced by: Makoto Tsumura (Japanese); Brian Beacock (English)
Takato is a 10 year old student. (Note: In the Japanese version, the main characters are 10 years old and in 5th grade. In the English version, the characters' ages were changed to 13 years old.) His parents run their own bakery. He plays the DigiBattle card game with his friends and draws his own Digimon, Guilmon, on paper, which he brings to life after finding a Blue Card and using it on a Digivice. Because Guilmon was a product of his imagination, Takato appears to be empathic with him and thus the two influence each other in every fight. Their bond is augmented when Takato biomerges with Guilmon into Gallantmon. After learning that Digimon are mysteriously appearing in their world, Takato becomes a Tamer and leader of the group fighting to stop rogue Digimon from causing chaos. He also appears in Digimon Fusion. To reflect the normalcy of the characters, Takato was imagined to be a "normal" boy who is "full of curiosity" and "fascinated by monsters and Digimon." To continue the tradition of naming the leading characters in the Digimon series, Takato's name began with the same sound as Tai and Davis' Japanese names, the leading characters from Digimon Adventure and Digimon Adventure 02.
Rika Nonaka (牧野 留姫, Makino Ruki)
Voiced by: Fumiko Orikasa (Japanese); Melissa Fahn (English)
Rika is a 10-year-old champion of the Digimon Card Tournament and known by the title "Digimon Queen." Her relationship with her mother is initially strained, as she is often too busy with work to spend time with her. She is partnered with Renamon. At first, she has a cold and lonely personality and believes in fighting Digimon to become the strongest. However, Takato helps her see that there is more to Digimon beyond fighting. She also appears in Digimon Fusion. Rika was designed with a "strong" image and character in an attempt to boost sales for products based on female characters, which traditionally did not perform well in the market. In early stages of her design, Konaka and Nakatsuru based her on Trinity from The Matrix. Fumiko Orikasa was cast to play her due to her clear, strong voice. Konaka decided not to give Rika a father figure to reflect how many Japanese children have grown up without fathers, and he did not intend it to be the cause of her "twisted personality" in spite of the events portrayed in the film Runaway Locomon (which he had no involvement in).
Henry Wong (李 健良, Rī Jenrya; Lee Jianliang)
Voiced by: Mayumi Yamaguchi (Japanese); Dave Wittenberg (English)
Henry is a 10-year-old student of half-Japanese and half-Hong Kong Chinese descent from Takato's school, though they are not in the same class. In the Japanese version, he is nicknamed Jian (ジェン, Jen) for short when he grows closer to his friends. Because Henry takes care of his younger sister, Suzie, he is patient and mature for his age. He is also experienced with computers and technology because his father is a computer engineer. Henry is partnered with Terriermon, and because he dislikes hurting others, he is reluctant to fight. He is also a tai chi practitioner. Throughout the series, he is unaware of his father's connection with the Monster Makers and Hypnos. Henry became the basis of the proposed non-Japanese or emigrant character Hiromi Seki had wanted for the main cast. Konaka decided to make him half-Chinese and half-Japanese based on the statistics of non-Japanese students in elementary schools. Originally, Henry was written as a foil to Takato, where he would offer "a difference in values" that contrasted with Takato's "child-like beliefs and values."

==== Other Tamers ====
Jeri Kato (加藤 樹莉, Katō Jūri)
Voiced by: Yoko Asada (Japanese); Bridget Hoffman (series), Philece Sampler (Runaway Locomon) (English)
One of Takato's classmates, a sweet-mannered girl who always tries to encourage her friends. Her family owns a tavern in Shibuya. Hoping to become stronger, she eventually becomes the partner of Leomon. Despite her cheerful demeanor, Jeri has a strained relationship with her father and stepmother and believes herself to be unworthy of love. When Leomon is killed by Beelzemon, Jeri's despair attracts the D-Reaper's attention and it abducts her, feeding off of her negative emotions to grow and invade the Real World.
Ryo Akiyama (秋山 遼, Akiyama Ryō)
Voiced by: Junichi Kanemaru (Japanese); Steve Staley (English)
A skilled Tamer who the Tamers encounter in the Digital World, which he arrived through unspecified means. Ryo is revealed to have been the only person to have previously defeated Rika in a DigiBattle Card tournament. His partner is Cyberdramon. His character had previously appeared in the Digimon Adventures timeline and was the protagonist of the Digimon games for the Wonderswan console.
Kazu Shiota (塩田 博和, Shiota Hirokazu)
Voiced by: Yukiko Tamaki (Japanese); Brad MacDonald (English)
One of Takato's friends and an avid player of the DigiBattle Card game, considered much better at the game than Takato and Kenta. Although he frequently brags about his superiority, he is still loyal and eager to help his friends. He accompanies Takato and the other Tamers to the Digital World in hopes of gaining a partner of his own, and eventually becomes the Tamer of Guardromon.
Kenta Kitagawa (北川 健太, Kitagawa Kenta)
Voiced by: Touko Aoyama (Japanese); Steve Blum (English)
One of Takato's friends, often seen with Kazu. He is meeker and more timid than his friends, but still excitable and eager to join in their adventures. After he becomes resigned that all his friends have gained Digimon partners except him, Kenta is thrilled when the mega-level Digimon MarineAngemon chooses him as its partner.
Suzie Wong (李 小春, Rī Shiuchon; Lee Shaochung)
Voiced by: Ai Nagano (Japanese); Peggy O'Neal (English)
Henry's younger sister, a playful and carefree girl who initially believes that Terriermon is a plush toy. She is pulled into the Digital World after Henry and the Tamers leave to rescue Calumon, and she ends up befriending the Rabbit Deva, Antylamon, who becomes Suzie's partner. Because Antylamon chose to protect Suzie from the other Devas, her master Zhuqiaomon punishes Antylamon by de-Digivolving her into her rookie form, Lopmon.
Ai (アイ) and Mako (マコト, Makoto)
Voiced by: Haruhi Terada and Miwa Matsumoto (Japanese); Rebecca Forstadt and Wendee Lee (English)
A pair of very young children who often squabble over both Impmon and their toys, they inadvertently drove Impmon away and led him to believe that Digimon did not need humans. After returning to the Real World, Impmon finds the children ashamed of their behavior and that they missed him deeply. They ask for his forgiveness, which he accepts. The renewed strength of their bond allows Impmon to become Beelzemon Blast Mode, and the siblings later jointly become his Tamer.

=== Partner Digimon ===
Guilmon (ギルモン, Girumon)
Voiced by: Masako Nozawa (Japanese); Steve Blum (English)
Guilmon is a reptilian Digimon that resembles a theropod dinosaur with a digital hazard symbol on his chest. He is created by Takato, who drew him and was brought to life soon after by the Blue Card which the DigiGnomes secretly placed among his card deck. Guilmon originally has the mentality of a child, unaware of the differences between humans and Digimon, often calling his partner "Takatomon". He stays in a shed of Shinjuku Park, learning to speak normally and develops a better understanding of the world around him. Guilmon possesses a taste for bread, often being distracted by the thought of food. Guilmon has a very keen sense of smell and possesses somewhat of a sixth sense to detect other Digimon in the vicinity, usually going feral in fights due to his virus-type nature. He is also loyal and protective. Guilmon's Champion form is the dinosaur-like Growlmon (グラウモン, Guraumon), his Ultimate form is the cyborg dinosaur-like WarGrowlmon (メガログラウモン, Megaroguraumon), and his Dark Mega Form is the snake-tailed dragon-like Megidramon (メギドラモン, Megidoramon). Guilmon and Takato can also Bio-Merge to become the knight-like Gallantmon (デュークモン, Dūkumon). When Guilmon reverts into Gigimon as a side effect of the Red Card, he says goodbye to Takato. Guilmon also appeared in Digimon Fusion. Guilmon was created by Chiaki J. Konaka, influenced by Ultraman and Kaiju films. Upon viewing the initial design sketches, he assumed that the character would be roughly the same size as Agumon. However, when he realized that Guilmon would be about the size of a human adult, he realized that "[h]e was nowhere near small enough for a child to hide in his room." Konaka realized that he could tailor the plot of the series to incorporate the problem.
Terriermon (テリアモン, Teriamon)
Voiced by: Aoi Tada (Japanese); Mona Marshall (English)
Terriermon is a small one-horned terrier-like Digimon with a laid-back personality, often using the word "Momantai" (written as 無問題 or 无问题), a Cantonese phrase meaning "take it easy/no problem". Terriermon was originally a wild Digimon living by the survival of the fittest rules in the Digital World. Henry chooses Terriermon, while playing a video game. When Terriermon Digivolves into the Galgo Español-like Gargomon (ガルゴモン, Garugomon), he goes on a rampage while fighting Gorillamon and loses control. Henry uses a Blue Card to send him out from the computer to the real world. Throughout the series, Henry hid Terriermon from his family, using him like a stuffed toy which Suzie plays with. His Ultimate Form is the poodle-like Rapidmon (ラピッドモン, Rapiddomon) which is different from the gold version. Henry can Bio-Merge with Terriermon to become the St. Bernard-like MegaGargomon (セントガルゴモン, Sentogarugomon). When Terriermon reverts into Gummymon as a side effect of the Red Card, he says goodbye to Henry.
Renamon (レナモン)
Voiced by: Yuka Imai (Japanese); Mari Devon (English)
Renamon is a yellow bipedal fox-like Digimon with a mature personality for a Rookie level. In a fight, she uses ninja-like skills, such as vanishing from view until called and moving at fast speeds. These traits mean that, unlike Guilmon and Terriermon, she can fend for herself when Rika is at school, and never gets into trouble like Guilmon. She has no memory of her life before meeting Rika, whom she first saw as nothing more than a means to become stronger. Her initial exchanges with the other Tamers and their Digimon cause her to question this belief, and Rika's obsession with battle. When Rika and Renamon part ways, they begin to understand each other, and reunite themselves for their apology. Renamon learns that Impmon is selfish, because he is desperate for Digivolution. Renamon's Champion form is the nine-tailed fox-like Kyubimon (キュウビモン, Kyūbimon) and the anthropomorphic fox/Onmyōji-like Taomon (タオモン). Rika can Bio-Merge with Renamon to become the fox-armored Sakuyamon (サクヤモン). When Renamon reverts into Viximon as a side effect of the Red Card, she says goodbye to Rika. Renamon also appeared in Digimon Fusion.
Impmon (インプモン, Inpumon)
Voiced by: Hiroki Takahashi (Japanese); Derek Stephen Prince (English)
Impmon is a small, purple Digimon resembling a demonic imp, sporting red gloves and a red bandana around his neck. Originally introduced as a troublemaker, Impmon develops a bond with the Tamers and their Digimon, albeit reluctantly due to his loner nature. Impmon initially boasts how strong he is, stating having a human Tamer is more of a hinderance than a help, eventually admitting to Renamon his desire to Digivolve. Through flashbacks, Impmon formerly had two Tamer partners, a pair of siblings named Ai and Mako, but left due to their constant fighting and arguing. After making a deal with the Devas, Impmon was given the power to Digivolve to his Beelzebub-like Mega form Beelzemon (ベルゼブモン, Beruzebumon), which he used to terrorize the Digital World and attack the Tamers and their Digimon, killing Jeri's partner Leomon in the process. After being shown mercy by Takato and Guilmon in their combined form Gallantmon, Beelzemon wandered off, reverting back into Impmon. Back in the real world, he reunites with Ai and Mako, who apologize to Impmon for their behavior. With their bond restored, Impmon is able to Digivolve into a stronger version of his Mega form Beelzemon Blast Mode (ベルゼブモン：ブラストモード, Beruzebumon: burastomōdo). Ai and Mako later joined Impmon into meeting up with the other Tamers where Jeri finally accepted Impmon's apology for what he did to Leomon. When Impmon reverts into Yaamon as a side effect of the Red Card, he says goodbye to Ai and Mako.
Leomon (レオモン)
Voiced by: Paul St. Peter
A lion-like Digimon. He first arrived in the Real World where he saved Jeri and Calumon from Kumbhiramon. Leomon officially became Jeri's partner when trying to save Calumon from Makuramon. When trying to reason with Beelzemon, he was fatally impaled by him. Before fully deleting, Leomon tells a saddened Jeri that a part of him will always remain with her.
Cyberdramon (サイバードラモン, Saibādoramon)
Voiced by: Ikkei Seta (Japanese); Lex Lang (English)
A cyborg dragonoid-like Digimon who is Ryo's partner. His Rookie form is the dragon-like Monodramon (モノドラモン, Monodoramon) who has bat-like wings on his arms. Ryo can Bio-Merge with Cyberdramon to become the Tokusatsu-like Justimon (Blitz Arm) (ジャスティモン ブリッツアーム, Jasutimon burittsuāmu)
Guardromon (ガードロモン, Gādoromon)
Voiced by: Kiyoyuki Yanada (Japanese); Richard Cansino (English)
A guard robot-like Digimon. Originally starting out as the android-like Andromon (アンドロモン, Andoromon) who was badly beaten trying to save a Gekomon village from Orochimon, he regressed back to Guardromon. Following Orochimon being destroyed by Leomon, Guardromon became Kazu's partner.
MarineAngemon (マリンエンジェモン, Marinenjemon)
Voiced by: Ai Iwamura (Japanese); Wendee Lee (English)
A bird-winged clione-like Digimon who was among the Mega level Digimon that responded to Calumon's Shining Digivolution. Becoming Kenta's partner, MarineAngemon became the first Mega level Digimon in the franchise to gain a human partner.
Lopmon (ロップモン, Roppumon)
Voiced by: Aoi Tada (Japanese); Michelle Ruff (English)
A Lagomorpha-like Digimon that resembles a three-horned brown Terriermon. Starting out as the rabbit-like Antylamon (アンティラモン, Antiramon) of the Devas, she befriended Suzie. Unlike its Virus counterpart, this version possesses a scarf. After helping to defend Suzie from Makuramon, she became Suzie's partner after Zhuqiaomon de-Digivolved Antylamon to Lopmon.

=== Hypnos ===
Hypnos (ヒュプノス, Hyupunosu) is a Japanese government organization

Mitsuo Yamaki (山木 満雄, Yamaki Mitsuo)
Voiced by: Susumu Chiba (Japanese); Steve Blum (English)
A government agent responsible for designing the Hypnos system to monitor Earth's electronic communications network and section chief of the Hypnos Network. He initially appears as an antagonist to Takato, Henry, and Rika, as he believes the Digimon emerging in the Real World are dangerous faulty programs that need to be exterminated. When he realizes his attempts to eradicate Digimon have only made the Real World more vulnerable, he becomes an ally to Takato and the Tamers.
Riley Ohtori (鳳 麗花, Ōtori Reika)
Voiced by: Ai Nagano (Japanese); Tifanie Christun (series), Philece Sampler (Runaway Locomon) (English)
The chief system operator of Hypnos. She is implied to be in a relationship with Yamaki and serves as his emotional counterweight.
Tally Onodera (小野寺 恵, Onodera Megumi)
Voiced by: Fumiko Miyashita (Japanese); Peggy O'Neal (English)
One of the Hypnos system operators, and friends with her fellow employee, Riley Ohtori.
Man in Black (黒衣の男, Kokui no otoko)
Voiced by: R. Martin Klein
A field operative for Hypnos.
Chief Cabinet Secretary (内閣官房長官, Naikaku kanbō chōkan)
Voiced by: Dave Mallow
A government official who sanctioned Hypnos.

=== Monster Makers ===
The Monster Makers (ワイルド・バンチ, Wairudo Banchi) are a group of programmers who went to college together. They were responsible for the creation of the original Digimon program. The Monster Makers were later reunited by Hypnos in order to learn more about the Digimon.

Janyu Wong (李 鎮宇, Rī Jan'yū; Lee Jiangyu)
Voiced by: Yoshiyuki Kaneko (Japanese); Jamieson Price (English)
Henry and Suzie's father, a computer engineer who is revealed to have been part of the Monster Makers, a group responsible for creating prototype digital beings that would later evolve into Digimon. Janyu learns of the existence of Digimon and becomes an ally to Henry and the Tamers, but also garners the attention of Yamaki and Hypnos, who seek to destroy the Digimon emerging in the Real World.
Gorou Mizuno (水野 悟郎, Mizuno Gorō)
Voiced by: Taro Suba (Japanese); Bob Glouberman (English)
A professor and introverted member of the Monster Makers with the codename "Shibumi". While using a special hospital project to project himself into the Digital World, he has since eluded the government agents. Before waking up in his hospital bed, Shibumi informed the Tamers about the D-Reaper. He later reunited with the rest of the Monster Makers during the D-Reaper threat.
Rob McCoy (ロブ・マッコイ, Robu Makkoi)
Voiced by: Masami Kikuchi (Japanese); Tom Fahn (English)
A Palo Alto University professor with the codename "Dolphin". He later appeared as an NPC in Digimon Masters.
Aishwarya Rai (アイシュワリャ・ライ, Aishuwarya Rai)
Voiced by: Yuko Matsuoka (Japanese); Dorothy Elias-Fahn (English)
An Indian professor from Miscatonic University, with the codename "Curly". She is an expert in quantum theory.
Babel (バベル, Baberu)
Voiced by: Kenji Nomura (Japanese); Neil Kaplan (English)
An African-American theoretical physics expert.
Daisy (デイジー, Deijī)
Voiced by: Asako Dodo (Japanese); Wendee Lee (English)
A robotics and software expert.
Johnny Beckenstein (ジョニー・ベッケンスタイン, Jonī Bekkensutain)
Voiced by: Tako Ishii (Japanese); Dave Wittenberg (English)
An American ally of the Monster Makers.

=== Digimon Sovereign ===
The Digimon Sovereign (四聖獣, Shi seijū; Four Holy Beasts) are four Mega level Digimon who are the guardians of the different parts of the Digital World.

Zhuqiaomon (スーツェーモン, Sūtsēmon)
Voiced by: Syuichiro Moriyama (Japanese); Tony Pope (English)
A Vermilion Bird-like Digimon who guards the southern parts of the Digital World. He was the one who sent the Devas to bring Calumon back to the Digital World. Extremely hostile to humans, Zhuqiaomon fights against the Tamers until Azulongmon persuades him to stand down.
Azulongmon (チンロンモン, Chinronmon)
Voiced by: Jūrōta Kosugi (Japanese); Michael McConnohie (English)
An Azure Dragon-like Digimon who guards the eastern parts of the Digital World and is the more wiser of the Digimon Sovereign. He was first seen when he saves the Tamers from Zhuqiaomon and gets him to stand down.
Ebonwumon (シェンウーモン, Shen'ūmon)
Voiced by: Joji Yanami (Japanese); Dave Wittenberg (English)
A two-headed Black Tortoise-like Digimon with a tree on its shell who guards the northern parts of the Digital World. Ryo and Cyberdramon encounter him while he was watching over Baihumon's land.
Baihumon (バイフーモン, Baifūmon)
Voiced by: Shinichi Kotani (Japanese); Steve Kramer (English)
A White Tiger-like Digimon who guards the western parts of the Digital World. He was fighting the D-Reaper in the chasms of his land before falling back.

==== Devas ====
The Devas (デーヴァ, Dēva) are the servants of the Digimon Sovereign who were created from the deleted data of the fallen Digimon. Each one is named after the Twelve Heavenly Generals and are modeled after the creatures of the Chinese zodiac.

Mihiramon (ミヒラモン)
Voiced by: Masahiko Tanaka (Japanese); Bob Papenbrook (English)
A winged tiger-like Digimon who was the first Deva to appear on Earth in light of Hypnos activating the Juggernaut program. He defeats Kyubimon and Gargomon before being destroyed by WarGrowlmon.
Sandiramon (サンティラモン)
Voiced by: Ikkei Seta (Japanese); Lex Lang (English)
An Indian cobra-like Digimon with a snake motif who manifests in the subway. Before being deleting upon his defeat at the hands of Growlmon, Kyubimon, and Gargomon, Sandiramon warns them that he is one of the Devas and the rest of his group will avenge him.
Sinduramon (シンドゥーラモン, Shindūramon)
Voiced by: Issei Futamata (Japanese); Richard Epcar (English)
An electrical chicken-like Digimon with a rooster motif who manifests in the country. At one point, he controls an owl to act as his herald. During a fight near the dam, Growlmon's Pyro Blaster knocks Sinduramon into the water, resulting in his deletion.
Pajiramon (パジラモン)
Voiced by: Masako Katsuki (Japanese); Mary Elizabeth McGlynn (English)
A sheep-like Digimon with a centaur-like build. She accompanied Vajramon in causing trouble downtown. Pajiramon is destroyed by Rapidmon.
Vajramon (ヴァジラモン, Vajiramon)
Voiced by: Unsho Ishizuka (Japanese); Michael McConnohie (English)
An ox-like Digimon with a centaur-like build. He accompanied Pajiramon in causing trouble downtown. Though Vajramon is hit by Rapidmon's attack which destroys Pajiramon, he manages to pull himself back together and entice Renamon into a parley. When the two of them meet again, Renamon reveals that she only used him to get information. During the fight against Vajramon, Kyubimon Digivolves to Taomon and destroys Vajramon.
Indramon (インダラモン, Indaramon)
Voiced by: Kenyu Horiuchi (Japanese); Neil Kaplan (English)
A bipedal horse-like Digimon who carries the Horn of Desolation on his back. In his initial appearance, he taunts and bests Impmon, and causes some difficulty for Growlmon, Kyubimon, and Gargomon, before seemingly disappearing. When he returns, significantly larger and more powerful, Indramon is destroyed by WarGrowlmon.
Makuramon (マクラモン)
Voiced by: Ryo Horikawa (Japanese); Joe Ochman (English)
A large-headed monkey-like Digimon who observes the Tamers. During to Vikaralamon's rampage, Makuramon sheds his disguise and demands that Jeri, Kazu, and Kenta hand over Calumon. Following Vikaralamon's destruction, Makuramon snatches Calumon and take him back to the Digital World. However, Calumon escapes, leaving Makuramon to search for him with Majiramon. While Makuramon tries to break up the fight between the Tamers and Beelzemon, Makuramon is destroyed by Beelzemon.
Kumbhiramon (クンビラモン, Kunbiramon)
Voiced by: Kouki Miyata (Japanese); Joshua Seth (English)
A winged rat-like Digimon who is the smallest of the Devas. He bio-emerges from a sewer and attacks Jeri and Calumon until Leomon shows up and fights him off. During the next fight, Kumbhiramon is destroyed by Gargomon and Leomon.
Vikaralamon (ヴィカラーラモン, Vikarāramon)
Voiced by: Masafumi Kimura (Japanese); Michael Sorich (English)
A boar-like Digimon who is the largest of the Devas. He causes a rampage throughout the city. Vikaralamon is nearly caught in Hypnos' Juggernaut program until Makuramon attacks Hypnos' headquarters. Afterwards, Vikaralamon is destroyed by WarGrowlmon.
Caturamon (チャツラモン, Chatsuramon)
Voiced by: Koji Ishii (Japanese); Tom Wyner (English)
A Shisa-like Digimon with a dog motif. He is first seen making contact with Impmon on wanting the power to Digivolve. When Impmon meets up with Caturamon, he opens a portal to a lava pool where Zhuqiaomon grants Impmon to Warp-Digivolve into Beelzemon. Caturamon later visits Beelzemon after his victory against a Kurisarimon swarm and Infermon. Following Beelzemon's failure to reclaim Calumon, Caturamon succeeds in capturing Calumon during a storm in the Digital World caused by someone activating the Juggernaut program. During Gallantmon's fight with Beelzemon, Caturamon is dispatched to dispose of the traitor Lopmon. He is destroyed by Gallantmon and his data was absorbed by Beelzemon.
Majiramon (マジラモン)
Voiced by: Kajima Kazunari (Japanese); Bob Papenbrook (English)
A Chinese dragon-like Digimon with a centaur-like build who accompanies Makuramon in reclaiming Calumon. When they run into the Tamers, Makuramon leaves Majiramon to fight the Tamers. He withstood the damages caused by the Champion level Digimon before being destroyed by Cyberdramon, after Ryo modified him with the Goliath card.
Antylamon (アンティラモン, Antiramon)
Voiced by: Aoi Tada (Japanese); Michelle Ruff (English)
The rabbit-like Deva and gatekeeper to Zhuqiaomon's fortress. Zhuqiaomon de-digvolves her into Lopmon as punishment for befriending Suzie. As Lopmon, she is the last and only surviving Deva.

=== Family members ===
Takehiro Matsuki (松田 剛弘, Matsuda Takehiro)
Voiced by: Nobuaki Kanemitsu (Japanese); Kirk Thornton (English)
The father of Takato. He is a baker and the co-owner of Matsuki Bakery.
Yoshie Matsuki (松田 美枝, Matsuda Yoshie)
Voiced by: (Japanese); Philece Sampler (English)
The mother of Takato and wife of Takehiro. She is a baker and the co-owner of Matsuki Bakery.
Kai Urazoe (浦添 海, Urazoe Kai)
Voiced by: Tomoe Seki (Japanese); Brian Donovan (anime), Yuri Lowenthal (in Battle of Adventurers) (English)
The cousin of Takato who lives in Okinawa. He first appeared in Digimon Tamers: Battle of Adventurers where he befriended Guilmon. He later appeared in the main series during the threat of the D-Reaper.
Wataru Urazoe (浦添 ワタル, Urazoe Wataru)
Voiced by: Ginzō Matsuo (Japanese); David Lodge (English)
The grandfather of Takato and Kai who lives in Okinawa.
Mayumi Wong (李 麻由美, Rī Mayumi)
Voiced by: Mari Adachi (Japanese); Dorothy Elias-Fahn (English)
The mother of Henry and Suzie and wife of Janyu.
Jaarin Wong (李 嘉玲, Rī Jaarin)
Voiced by: Mari Yoshikura (Japanese); Wendee Lee (English)
The 15-year-old sister of Henry and Suzie.
Rinchei Wong (李 連杰, Rī Rinchei)
The 17-year-old brother of Henry and Suzie.
Rumiko Nonaka (牧野 ルミ子, Makino Rumiko)
Voiced by: Yuko Imai (Japanese); Mary Elizabeth McGlynn (English)
Rika's mother, who works as a model.
Seiko Hata (秦 聖子, Hata Seiko)
Voiced by: Yuka Imai (Japanese); Barbara Goodson (English)
The grandmother of Rika.
Tadashi Kato (加藤 肇, Katō Hajime)
Voiced by: Haruo Sato (Japanese); Bob Papenbrook (English)
The father of Jeri who is a tavern owner.
Shizue Kato (加藤 静江, Katō Shizue)
Voiced by: Mari Adachi (Japanese); Bridget Hoffman (English)
The stepmother of Jeri.
Masahiko Kato (加藤 昌彦, Katō Masahiko)
Voiced by: (Japanese); Mary Elizabeth McGlynn in "Homeward Bound", Dina Sherman (other appearances) (English)
The 3-year-old half-brother of Jeri.
Hirofumi Shioda (塩田 博文, Shiota Hirofumi)
Voiced by: Lex Lang
The father of Kazu.
Takako Shioda (塩田 貴子, Shiota Takako)
Voiced by: Rieko Nakayama (Japanese); Michelle Ruff (English)
The mother of Kazu.
Shunsuke Kitagawa (北川 駿介, Kitagawa Shunsuke)
Voiced by: Dan Lorge
The father of Kenta.
Akemi Kitagawa (北川 明美, Kitagawa Akemi)
Voiced by: Tifanie Christun
The mother of Kenta.

=== Yodobashi Elementary ===
Nami Asaji (浅沼 奈美, Asanuma Nami)
Voiced by: Kaya Matsutani (Japanese); Lara Jill Miller (English)
A teacher at Yodobashi Elementary who has Takato, Jeri, Kazu, and Kenta as her students. She later appeared as an NPC in Digimon Masters.
Seiji Kurosawa (黒沢 清二, Kurosawa Seiji)
Voiced by: Jun'ichi Sugawara (Japanese); Tom Wyner (English)
The principal of Yodobashi Elementary.
Toshiaki Mori (森 聡明, Mori Toshiaki)
Voiced by: Susumu Chiba (Japanese); R. Martin Klein (English)
A teacher at Yodobashi Elementary who tries to impress Nami Asaji to no avail.

=== Other characters ===
Calumon (クルモン, Kurumon)
Voiced by: Tomoko Kaneda (Japanese); Brianne Siddall (English)
A mysterious Carbuncle-like Digimon that appears in the Real World, lacking the ability to Digivolve or attack, Calumon is friendly and loves to play. It soon befriends Guilmon, Terriermon, and Impmon, and becomes close to Jeri and Rika. Calumon is eventually revealed to be the "Catalyst"—the power of Digivolution—transformed by the Digimon Sovereigns into a Digimon in hopes of stopping the D-Reaper.
Chou (チョウ, Chō)
Voiced by: Kōichi Kitamura (Japanese); Michael McConnohie (English)
Henry's martial arts teacher. He is knowledgeable about the Deva legend. Chou would later come across Impmon and helps him figure out a message from Ai and Mako.
Sugai (菅井)
Voiced by: Yūsuke Oguri (Japanese); Lex Lang (English)
The agent of Rumiko.
Mizaki (土岐, Toki)
Voiced by: Fumiko Miyashita (Japanese); Tifanie Christun (English)
A reporter who covers the different D-Reaper incidents.

=== Digital World inhabitants ===
DigiGnome (デジノーム, Dejinōmu)
A race of non-Digimon that are evolved from the same data that created the Digimon race. They are known to grant wishes in both the Real World and the Digital World.
Mokumon (モクモン)
A group of smoke-like Digimon that worked with Shibumi in helping the Tamers.
Meramon (メラモン)
Voiced by: Kojimi Kuzanari (Japanese); Peter Spellos (English)
A fire spirit-like Digimon who the Tamers first encounter when they enter the Digital World. Assuming that they are enemy invaders, Meramon attacked them until he was subdued by Leomon and the Tamers cleared things up. During a Jagamon stampede, Meramon tried to stop the stampede and got trampled into deletion by them. The Tamers made a marker to memorialize him.
Jagamon (ジャガモン)
Voiced by: Yūsuke Oguri (Japanese); Joe Ochman (English)
A herd of potato-like Digimon.
Jijimon (ジジモン) and Babamon (ババモン)
Jijimon Voiced by: Masafumi Kimura (Japanese); Tom Fahn (English)
Babamon Voiced by: Dorothy Elias-Fahn
An old man-themed Digimon and an old lady-themed Digimon who lived in a valley with strong winds. They allowed Rika, Kazu, and Kenta to take refuge with them. When Calumon unleashed the Shining Digivolution, Jijimon and Babamon answered the call.
MudFrigimon (ツチダルモン, Tsuchidarumon)
Voiced by: Joey D'Auria
A village of bear/mud-like Digimon that resemble a brown version of Frigimon which was harassed by the motorcycle Behemoth. At least one MudFrigimon was killed during the rampage. The MudFrigimon Village was saved when Leomon broke Guilmon from Behemoth's control leading Behemoth to become the ride of Beezlemon. The MudFrigimon later get exposed to Calumon's Shining Digivolution.
MetalKoromon (チョロモン, Choromon)
Voiced by: Melodee Spevack
A computer mouse-like Digimon that was controlled by Behemoth. It was freed by Guilmon.
Clockmon (クロックモン, Kurokkumon)
Voiced by: Yūsuke Oguri (Japanese); R. Martin Klein (English)
A clock-themed Digimon with a humanoid emerging from its clock part. He resided in the clockwork cloud plane where he encountered Rika, Kazu, and Kenta restaring a clock that ended up freeing Megadramon until Ryo and Cyberdramon show up to undo the action.
Hagurumon (ハグルモン)
Voiced by: Beau Billingslea
A gear-themed Digimon that resided in the clockwork cloud plane with Clockmon. They encounter Rika, Kazu, and Kenta restarting a clock that ended up freeing Megadramon. One of Kyubimon's attacks which was deflected off of Megadramon hit Hagurumon enough for one of his gears to come out. After Ryo and Cyberdramon show up to undo the action, Ryo put the gear back into Hagurumon as he and Clockmon prase Ryo. When Calumon unleashed the Shining Digivolution, Hagurumon was exposed to it.
Megadramon (メガドラモン, Megadoramon)
Voiced by: Shibayama Yutaka
A dragon-like Digimon with a snake tail instead of legs that was sealed away in the clockwork cloud plane. When Rika, Kazu, and Kenta unknowingly restarted a clock, Megadramon was freed from its prison. Renamon Digivolved to Kyubimon to stop it to no avail. When Ryo and Cyberdramon showed up, Cyberdramon shoved Megadramon back into its prison as Ryo stopped the associated clock again.
Orochimon (オロチモン)
Voiced by: Lex Lang
A Yamata no Orochi-like Digimon that fell from another plane and enslaved a village of Gekomon, forcing them to make sake (changed to milkshakes in the English dub). One Andromon tried to fight it only to end up defeated and later de-Digivolved back into Guardromon. Jeri later used a LadyDevimon Digi-Modify card which enabled Leomon to destroy Orochimon with the Darkness Wave attack.
Gekomon (ゲコモン)
Voiced by: Dave Mallow
A village of frog-like Digimon that were enslaved by Orochimon. Their village was later saved by the Tamers. When Calumon unleashed the Shining Digivolution, the entire Gekomon Village was exposed.
Otamamon (オタマモン)
A group of pollywog-like Digimon that lived in an underwater cave plane.
Divermon (ハンギョモン, Hangyomon)
Voiced by: Yoshikazu Nagano (Japanese); Neil Kaplan (English)
A piscine humanoid-like Digimon that lived in an underwater cave plane. When Takato, Henry, and Terriermon encounter some Otamamon, they are attacked by Divermon. Terriermon defeated Divermon. It was then revealed to be a misunderstanding because Divermon thought that they were harming his Otamamon friends. They helped Takato, Henry, and Terriermon get up an electric pipe with a large bubble that the Otamamon created.

== Production ==
After the success of Digimon Adventure 02, Hiroyuki Kakudo and staff did not know what to do now that the series was finished. The team was satisfied with the release of Digimon Tamers, as Kakudo believed the setting could have also been applied in the previous anime. Chiaki J. Konaka was concerned that the portrayal of the Digimon as "kind-hearted creatures" in Digimon Adventure and Digimon Adventure 02 might affect the "monster-like spirit of Digimon." As a result, Konaka wanted to explore the primitive nature of Digimon, where they instinctively harm other creatures to become stronger and would learn morals from their partners. This aspect would be primarily explored through Guilmon.

Konaka was also worried about Digivolutions losing impact due to their repetitiveness. In order to solve this, the D-Power was designed as the new Digivice so that it could be used alongside cards and give the characters another "ace up sleeve." The writers wanted to limit the use of cards to one at a time. The main characters being more responsible of the evolutions and their adventures was another of Konaka's priorities as a message to children from modern society. For the last episodes of the series, Konaka believed the final enemy is the D-Reaper. While making the series, Konaka had conceptualized the idea of the Tamers combining with their Digimon to reach the highest level of evolution, Mega. Shinji Aramaki joined the design team in the CGI animation, which including the Bio-merge scenes.

Unlike the previous series, Konaka did not introduce the idea of Digimon being reborn after death, as he believed death should be portrayed realistically in a show for children, especially since the main characters were risking their lives. As a result, the staff decided to portray death as a shocking event by using Leomon like in Digimon Adventure, even though Konaka had doubts about it. While the series was presented as dark, Terriermon and Calumon balanced out the tone of the series.

The early storyline of Digimon Tamers was significantly influenced by an unused script for Gamera: Guardian of the Universe written by brothers Chiaki and Kazuya Konaka, alongside another draft by Yoshikazu Okada, which preceded the final version by Kazunori Itō. Concepts from the Konakas' script were later adapted for Digimon Tamers, as well as for Gamera the Brave, Gamera Rebirth, and Ultraman Tiga. Their draft itself was influenced by Daigoro vs. Goliath, a Tsuburaya Productions film under the influences from the Gamera franchise. Konaka, who had been an admirer of Ultraman since childhood, additionally cited Tsuburaya's Kaiju Booska—itself influenced by Ultra Q—and Hayao Miyazaki's Future Boy Conan as reference points for Tamers. The kaiju Kanegon from the Ultra Q and Ultraman franchises is also referenced in the spin-off prequel novel Digimon Tamers 1984.

=== Character design ===
The characters were designed by Katsuyoshi Nakatsuru and was based on the concept of "a normal elementary school student has a great adventure over the span of a year." Producer Hiromi Seki had wanted the three main characters to be of mixed genders and consist of an immigrant or someone not raised in Japan. Rika was designed with a "strong" image and character in an attempt to boost sales for products based on female characters, which traditionally did not perform well in the market. Henry became the basis of the proposed non-Japanese or emigrant character, and Konaka decided to make him half-Chinese and half-Japanese based on the statistics of non-Japanese students in elementary schools.

=== Sequel ===
In 2021, Konaka had posted on his blog that he originally had plans to create Digimon Tamers 2020, which would have been the continuation of an audio drama that was released with the 2018 limited edition Blu-ray box set of Digimon Tamers. However, Toei Animation had rejected the pitch; Konaka claimed it was due to casting problems, particularly in regards to having some voice actors reprise their roles or play older versions of their characters convincingly.

During DigiFes 2021, an official Digimon event taking place annually, a live reading featuring the original voice cast of an original audio drama that Konaka had written for Digimon Tamers' 20th anniversary. The script featured the Tamers fighting a villainous entity called "political correctness", which used an attack called "cancel culture." Konaka later clarified on his blog that he did not associate with any political ideology.

== Media ==
=== Anime ===
The series aired 51 episodes on Fuji TV from April 1, 2001, to March 31, 2002. The opening theme is "The Biggest Dreamer" by Kōji Wada, which peaked at #59 on the Oricon Weekly Singles Chart. The ending themes are performed by AiM. The ending theme for the first half of the series is "My Tomorrow" and for the second half, "Days (Love and the Ordinary)" (Days-愛情と日常-, Days ~Aijō to Nichijō~). "My Tomorrow" peaked at #70 on the Oricon Weekly Singles Chart, while "Days (Aijō to Nichijō)" charted at #68. Insert songs featured in the show include "Slash!!" by Michihiko Ohta as the Digi-modify theme, "Evo" by Wild Child Bound as the Digivolution and Matrix Digivolution themes, and "One Vision" by Takayoshi Tanimoto as the Biomerge Digivolution theme.

An edited English-language version was produced by distributor Saban Entertainment and aired on Fox Kids in the United States from September 1, 2001, to June 8, 2002, as the third season of Digimon: Digital Monsters. Saban's version received various changes to character names, music and sound effects, as well as edits pertaining to violence and cultural references. The show also began airing on ABC Family in 2002, after Disney had acquired the rights from Saban Entertainment, which later also included a package deal with Digimon Frontier. The show was released on Hulu with English subtitles in January 2011. New Video Group release the dubbed version as a DVD boxset in North America on June 11, 2013. Manga Entertainment released the series in the United Kingdom in 2018.

The series was added to the Netflix Instant Streaming service on August 3, 2013, in separate English dubbed and Japanese subtitled versions. The series was removed on August 1, 2015, after nearly two years on Netflix when Crunchyroll acquired streaming rights to the English dubbed versions and Funimation acquired rights to the English subtitled versions; the English dubbed version of Tamers later returned to Netflix while the English subtitled version of Tamers became exclusive to Funimation.

=== Films ===
Digimon Tamers: Battle of Adventurers (デジモンテイマーズ 冒険者たちの戦い, Dejimon Teimāzu: Bōkensha-tachi no Tatakai) was released on July 14, 2001, as part of Toei Animation Summer 2001 Animation Fair. The film was featured along with Mōtto! Ojamajo Doremi: The Movie: Kaeru Seki no Himitsu and Kinnikuman: Second Generations. The film takes place during the Tamers' summer vacation, where Mephistomon sends Digimon to invade the Real World through a virus called the "V-Pet." The film's ending theme song is "Moving On!" by AiM, which peaked at #95 on the Oricon Weekly Singles Chart. An insert song in the film, "Tomodachi no Umi" (トモダチの海), was performed by Sammy. The film's original soundtrack was released on December 5, 2001.

Digimon Tamers: Runaway Locomon (デジモンテイマーズ 暴走デジモン特急, Dejimon Teimāzu: Bōsō no Dejimon Tokkyū) was released on March 2, 2002, as part of Toei Animation Spring 2002 Animation Fair. The film was double-billed with One Piece: Chopper's Kingdom on the Island of Strange Animals. The film grossed ¥200 billion. The film's story is centered on the Tamers battling Locomon, who has been infected by Parasimon and led into the Real World. The film's ending theme song is "Yūhi no Yakusoku" (夕陽の約束) by AiM.

Both films will be released on Blu-ray in Discotek Media's second Digimon films collection.

=== CD dramas ===
Two CD dramas written by Chiaki J. Konaka were released. The voice cast from the series reprised their roles.

Digimon Tamers: Original Story: Message in the Packet (デジモンテイマーズ オリジナルストーリー メッセージ・イン・ザ・パケット, Dejimon Teimāzu: Orijinaru Sutōrī: Messeji in za Paketto) was released on April 23, 2003, and follows the lives of each Tamer after the events of Digimon Tamers.

Digimon Tamers: 2018 Days: Information and the Unordinary (デジモンテイマーズ 2018 Days -情報と非日常-, Dejimon Teimāzu: Ni-sen-jū-hachi Deizu: Jōhō to Hinichijō) was released on April 3, 2018, as a bonus with the first-press edition of the Digimon Tamers Blu-ray disc set.

=== Short story ===
Digimon Tamers 1984, written by Chiaki J. Konaka and illustrated by Kenji Watanabe, was published on July 5, 2002, in Volume 5 of SF Japan, a Japanese science fiction magazine. The story focuses on the creation of the original Digimon program by the Monster Makers at Palo Alto University and dealt largely with the philosophical and technological issues surrounding the creation of artificial intelligence. In 2018, Konaka uploaded an updated version of the story onto his website.

== Reception ==
Tim Jones of THEM Anime Reviews wrote that although Digimon Tamers had faults—such as slow character development, an abrupt change in new characters from the previous series, and a less exciting first half—viewers would enjoy it more the further they progressed. Compared with the first two series, Jones noted that Tamers displayed darker undertones in its plot. According to English-language dub voice actor Dave Wittenberg, the new series possessed an element of seriousness absent from the first two series, and some parts were more easily understood by older viewers owing to the introduction of more difficult concepts. In this regard, Konaka believed that Calumon and Terriermon were able to tone down the grim and serious atmosphere of the occasionally tough scenes throughout the series.
