= Digimon Tamers: Runaway Locomon =

2002 short film by Tetsuji Nakamura

- Theatrical release poster
- Japanese: デジモンテイマーズ 暴走デジモン特急
- Literal meaning: Digimon Tamers: Runaway Digimon Express
- Revised Hepburn: Dejimon Teimāzu Bōsō Dejimon Tokkyū
- Directed by: Tetsuji Nakamura
- Screenplay by: Hiro Masaki
- Based on: Digimon by Akiyoshi Hongo
- Starring: see below
- Edited by: Shigeru Nishiyama
- Music by: Takanori Arisawa
- Production company: Toei Animation
- Distributed by: Toei Company, Ltd.
- Release date: March 2, 2002
- Running time: 30 minutes
- Country: Japan
- Language: Japanese
- Box office: US$25.1 million

Digimon Tamers: Runaway Locomon (Note: Japanese: デジモンテイマーズ 暴走デジモン特急, Hepburn: Dejimon Teimāzu Bōsō Dejimon Tokkyū; lit. "Digimon Tamers: Runaway Digimon Express") is a 2002 Japanese animated adventure short film directed by Tetsuji Nakamura and written by Hiro Masaki; the short film is based on the Digimon franchise by Akiyoshi Hongo, and its third series, Digimon Tamers. Produced by Toei Animation and distributed by Toei Company, Runaway Locomon is the second film for Digimon Tamers series following Battle of Adventurers (2001), as well as the sixth film in the franchise. Set after the series finale, Tamers try to stop a train Digimon named Locomon on the Real World. Runaway Locomon was released in Japan on March 2, 2002, as part of Toei Animation Spring 2002 Animation Fair, double featuring with One Piece: Chopper's Kingdom on the Strange Island of Animals film.

== Plot ==
Six months after the D-Reaper's destruction, Rika is dismayed to learn that the Tamers are planning a surprise birthday party for her. An out-of-control train-Digimon, Locomon, appears and causes havoc as it begins racing around the tracks. In response, Takato has Guilmon digivolve into Growlmon to stop the train, but fails. Takato, Rika, and Renamon manage to board Locomon to find a way to slow it down. The remaining Tamers, except for Suzie, board a freight train to catch up to Locomon.

Mitsuo Yamaki takes command of the rail centre and realizes that Locomon's path is creating a distortion and forming an expanding digital field in the real world. He directs the rail workers to manually divert the tracks to redirect Locomon back to the Digital World. On board Locomon, Rika falls under the control of the train and attacks Takato as she has a vision of her estranged father. Takato discovers that Rika and Locomon are under the control of Parasimon. He and Guilmon biomerge into Gallantmon and destroy Parasimon to free Rika, but it manages to send out a signal to other Parasimon to begin their invasion.

Gallantmon, MegaGargomon, Sakuyamon, Justimon, Guardromon, MarineAngemon and Beelzemon Blast Mode fight back against the Parasimon, but are outnumbered. Gallantmon's determination allows them to change into Gallantmon Crimson Mode, giving them the power to destroy all the Parasimon at once. Locomon returns to the Digital World. All the Tamers attend Rika's birthday party. When Kazu asks Rika to sing after learning that she had been singing a song while under Parasimon's control, she leaves the party. As she watches the sunset, Rika sings the last line of her song in her head: "You promised me we'd stay for the sunset".

== Voice cast ==
Character	Japanese voice cast	English voice cast
Takato Matsuda (Takato Matsuki)	Makoto Tsumura	Brian Beacock
Guilmon	Masako Nozawa	Steve Blum
Lee Jianliang (Henry Wong)	Mayumi Yamaguchi	Dave Wittenberg
Terriermon	Aoi Tada	Mona Marshall
Ruki Makino (Rika Nonaka)	Fumiko Orikasa	Melissa Fahn
Renamon	Yuka Imai	Mari Devon
Culumon (Calumon)	Tomoko Kaneda	Brianne Siddall
Impmon	Hiroki Takahashi	Derek Stephen Prince
Juri Kato (Jeri Kato)	Yōko Asada	Philece Sampler (2005); Bridget Hoffman (2025)
Hirokazu Shiota (Kazu Shiota)	Yukiko Tamaki	Brad MacDonald
Guardromon	Kiyoyuki Yanada	Richard Cansino
Kenta Kitagawa	Tōko Aoyama	Steve Blum
MarineAngemon	Ai Iwamura	Mona Marshall
Ryo Akiyama	Jun'ichi Kanemaru	Steve Staley
Cyberdramon	Ikkei Seta	Lex Lang
Mitsuo Yamaki	Susumu Chiba	Steve Blum
Locomon	Yūta Mochizuki	Lex Lang
Parasimon	Kaneta Kimotsuki	David Lodge

== Production ==
The short film is directed by Tetsuji Nakamura at Toei Animation, with Hiro Masaki providing the screenplay, and Ken Ueno providing the animation direction for the film. The theme song for the film is titled "Yūhi no Yakusoku" (夕陽の約束; lit. "The Promise of the Setting Sun"), sung by AiM.

== Release ==
The film was released in Japan on March 2, 2002, as part of Toei Animation Spring 2002 Animation Fair, double featuring with One Piece: Chopper's Kingdom on the Strange Island of Animals film. The film premiered on Jetix in the United States on October 2, 2005.

Discotek Media released the film on Blu-ray as part of the 2nd film collection alongside the Digimon Adventure 02 movie, Revenge of Diaboromon, and the first Tamers movie, Battle of Adventurers.
