= The Great Detective Sherlock Holmes =

Hong Kong children's book series

- Author: Lai Ho (credited as the full author of some books, credited as the adapter of other books)
- Original title: 大偵探福爾摩斯
- Country: Hong Kong
- Language: Traditional Chinese
- Genre: Children's literature
- Publisher: Rightman
- Published: 2010
- Published in English: 2016

The Great Detective Sherlock Holmes
- Traditional Chinese: 大偵探福爾摩斯
- Simplified Chinese: 大侦探福尔摩斯
- Jyutping: daai6 zing1 taam3 fuk1 ji5 mo1 si1
- Literal meaning: Great Detective Holmes
Transcriptions
Standard Mandarin
- Hanyu Pinyin: Dà Zhēntàn Fú'ěrmósī
Yue: Cantonese
- Jyutping: daai6 zing1 taam3 fuk1 ji5 mo1 si1

The Great Detective Sherlock Holmes (Chinese: 大偵探福爾摩斯) is an illustrated children's book series written and adapted by Hong Kong author Lai Ho from 2010 to his 2026 death. It is published by Rightman. It is an adaptation of Arthur Conan Doyle's Sherlock Holmes books, featuring anthropomorphic animal versions of the characters. Initially a direct adaptation of Doyle's books, the series has since diverged to adapting detective works by other authors. Maria Kan translated the series to English. Yu Yuen-wong was the first illustrator for the series before others took over.

== Characters ==
- Sherlock Holmes (Note: Sherlock Holmes: traditional Chinese: 夏洛克·福爾摩斯; simplified Chinese: 夏洛克·福尔摩斯; Jyutping: haa6 lok6 hak1 fuk1 ji5 mo1 si1; pinyin: Xiàluòkè Fú'ěrmósī)
- Dr. John Watson (Note: John Watson: 約翰·華生; 约翰·华生; joek3 hon6 waa4 sang1; Yuēhàn Huáshēng)
- Gordon "Gorilla" Riller (Note: Gordon "Gorilla" Riller: 李大猩; lei5 daai6 sing1; Lǐ Dàxīng; 'Big Ape')
- Carlson Fox (Note: Carlson Fox: 狐格森; wu4 gaak3 sam1; Hú Gésēn)
- Bunny (Note: Bunny: 小兔子; siu2 tou3 zi2; Xiǎo Tùzi; 'Little Rabbit')

== Adaptations ==
The series' popularity in Hong Kong led to the release of a film adaptation, Sherlock Holmes and the Great Escape (The Great Detective Sherlock Holmes – The Greatest Jail Breaker), released in 2019 by Golden Scene.

== See also ==
- Adaptations of Sherlock Holmes
- Sherlock Hound, animated series with a similar premise that served as its inspiration
