= Sherlock Holmes and the Great Escape =

2019 Hong Kong animated children's film

- Theatrical release poster
- Traditional Chinese: 大偵探福爾摩斯：逃獄大追捕
- Simplified Chinese: 大侦探福尔摩斯：逃狱大追捕
- Jyutping: Daai⁶ Zing¹taam³ Fuk¹ji⁵mo¹si¹: Tou⁴juk⁶ Daai⁶ Zeoi¹bou⁶
- Literal meaning: Great Detective Holmes: Escape and Big Pursuing
Transcriptions
Standard Mandarin
- Hanyu Pinyin: Dà Zhēntàn Fú'ěrmósī: Táoyù Dà Zhuībǔ
Yue: Cantonese
- Jyutping: Daai⁶ Zing¹taam³ Fuk¹ji⁵mo¹si¹: Tou⁴juk⁶ Daai⁶ Zeoi¹bou⁶
- Directed by: Toe Yuen; Matthew Chow
- Based on: The Great Detective Sherlock Holmes by Lai Ho
- Release dates: 28 July 2019 (Hong Kong Children's Film International Film Festival); 1 August 2019
- Country: Hong Kong
- Language: Cantonese

Sherlock Holmes and the Great Escape, originally titled The Great Detective Sherlock Holmes – The Greatest Jail Breaker, is a 2019 Hong Kong animated film based on the children's book series The Great Detective Sherlock Holmes. Toe Yuen and Matthew Chow (Note: Matthew Chow: traditional Chinese: 鄒榮肇; simplified Chinese: 邹荣肇; Jyutping: zau1 wing4 siu6; pinyin: Zōu Róngzhào) co-directed this film. Some investments into the film came from the company Golden Scene. The film was released theatrically in 2019.

Shout! Factory released an English dub in Canada and the United States on DVD on 23 March 2021.

== Characters ==
Character name	Voice actor	
	Cantonese	English
Sherlock Holmes (Note: Sherlock Holmes: 夏洛克·福爾摩斯; 夏洛克·福尔摩斯; haa6 lok6 hak1 fuk1 ji5 mo1 si1; Xiàluòkè Fú'ěrmósī)	Ken Wong Kai-Cheong	Robbie Daymond
Dr. John Watson (Note: John Watson: 約翰·華生; 约翰·华生; joek3 hon6 waa4 sang1; Yuēhàn Huáshēng)	Monte Cho Kai-Him	David Errigo Jr.
Mack (Note: Mack: 馬奇; 马奇; maa5 kei4; Mǎqí)	Stephen Au	Greg Chun
Scarface (Note: Scarface: 刀疤熊; dou1 baa1 hung4; Dāobā Xióng; 'Scarred (from a knife) bear')	Jerry Ku Ming-Wah	Jason Marnocha
Alice (Note: Alice: 愛麗絲; 爱丽丝; oi3 lai6 si1; Àilìsī)	Joyce Chan Hoi-Ting	Lizzie Freeman
Gordon "Gorilla" Riller (Note: Gordon "Gorilla" Riller: 李大猩; lei5 daai6 sing1; Lǐ Dàxīng; 'Big Ape')	Louis Yuen Siu Cheung	Kevin M. Connolly
Carlson Fox (Note: Carlson Fox: 狐格森; wu4 gaak3 sam1; Hú Gésēn)	Pasu Leung Wai-Tak	
Little Rabbit/Bunny (Note: Little Rabbit/Bunny: 小兔子; siu2 tou3 zi2; Xiǎo Tùzi; 'Little Rabbit')	Leander Lau	Abby Trott
Skinny Monkey	Toe Yuen	

== Reception ==
Edmund Lee of the South China Morning Post gave the film three of five stars.

Elizabeth Kerr of The Hollywood Reporter wrote that the film "colorfully tackles" several social issues.

== See also ==
- Adaptations of Sherlock Holmes
