= Mari Devon =

American voice actress (born 1959)

- Born: October 10, 1959 (age 67); New York City, New York, U.S.
- Other name: Jane Alan
- Occupation: Voice actress

Mari Devon (born October 10, 1959) is an American retired voice actress, best known as the voice of Togemon from Digimon Adventure, Renamon from Digimon Tamers, Tammy Nobi from Doraemon 2005, Haruka Urashima from the Love Hina series, Yayoi Matsunaga from Nightwalker, Maria Tachibana from Sakura Wars, and Tokimi from Tenchi Muyo Ryo Oki. Devon reprised her role as Togemon in Digimon Adventure Tri, and Tammy in Stand by Me Doraemon.

== Filmography ==
=== Animation ===
Year	Title	Role	Notes
1992–1995	Batman: The Animated Series	Summer Gleeson	22 episodes
1996	Freakazoid!	Tammy	Episode: "Hero Boy"
1999	Batman Beyond	Miss Winston	Episode: "Black Out"
2002	The Zeta Project	Computer	Episode: "Quality Time"
2009	Batman: The Brave and the Bold	Woman	Episode: "Trials of the Demon!"

=== Anime ===
- 8 Man After – Sachiko Yokogawa
- A Little Snow Fairy Sugar – Anne, Ginger, Greta's Mother
- The Adventures of Mini-Goddess – Marller
- Ah My Buddha – Jotoku Kawahara
- Apocalypse Zero – Ponta
- Aquarian Age – The Movie – Stella Blavatsky
- Babel II – Juju
- Battle Athletes – Dorm Chief
- Battle B-Daman – B-DaMage
- Berserk – Serpico's Mother, Villagers
- The Big O – Vice-President (Ep. 17)
- Blue Exorcist – Shimei's Mother (Ep. 4)
- Cyborg 009 – Daphne, Rosa (Ep. 13)
- Detatoko Princess – Okuchuuru
- Digimon: Digital Monsters – Togemon (Adventure, Adventure 02 and Adventure tri.), Izzy's mom (Adventure and 02), Arukenimon (Adventure 02), Viximon/Renamon/Kyubimon/Taomon/Sakuyamon (shared with Melissa Fahn) (Tamers), Dokugumon (Adventure)
- Dog of Flanders – Mrs. Jestas
- Doraemon – Tammy (Tamako Nobi)
- Eiken – Teacher, Nigo
- El Hazard: The Wanderers – Demon God Ifurita
- eX-Driver – Rei Kazuma
- Fafner – Yoko Hazuma
- Fight! Iczer-One – Iczer-Two
- Flint the Time Detective – Jillian Gray
- Fushigi Yûgi – Kai-ka's Mother
- Gad Guard – Hilda F. Harmony, Linda
- Gate Keepers – Mrs. Shinamura
- Gate Keepers 21 – Saemi Ikeda
- Gankutsuou: The Count of Monte Cristo – Victoria
- Ghost in the Shell: Stand Alone Complex – Seymour
- Gurren Lagann – Cybela Coutaud, Nakim
- Howl's Moving Castle – Honey
- Hunter × Hunter 2011 series – Woman at Agency (Ep. 30)
- Kanokon - Tamamo
- Kyo Kara Maoh! – Sharon
- Love Hina/OVA (Again) – Haruka Urashima
- Magic Knight Rayearth – Presea
- Mars Daybreak – Anna Grace
- Mirage of Blaze – Yuiko
- Mouse – Scientist, Woof's boss, Rin Nyan
- Mobile Suit Gundam – The Movie Trilogy – Kamaria Ray
- Mobile Suit Gundam 0083: Stardust Memory – Mora Bascht
- Mobile Suit Gundam F91 – Leahlee Edaberry
- Moldiver – Agent Brooke
- Naruto – Katsuyu
- Nura: Rise of the Yokai Clan- Kagibiri Onna
- Nightwalker – Kasumi, Shinji, Yayoi Matsunaga
- Noozles – Kelly Brown, Olivia
- Paradise Kiss – Isabella
- Petite Cossette – Zenshinni of Shakado
- Rave Master – Lasage
- Rurouni Kenshin – Takani Megumi
- Saiyuki Reload – Dr. Huang
- Sakura Wars: The Movie – Maria Tachibana
- Scrapped Princess – Queen Elmyr
- Shinzo – Queen Bee-Ing, Pixie Kadrian
- Space Adventure Cobra – Catherine
- Stellvia – Najima Gabourg
- Teknoman – Maggie
- Tenchi Muyo! – Tokimi; Z's Mother (OVA 3)
- Twelve Kingdoms – Kaiko; Ritsuko Nakajima
- Vandread – Gascogne/Gasco Rheingau
- Windaria – Marie

=== Film ===
Year	Title	Role	Notes
1982	Space Adventure Cobra: The Movie	Catherine Flower	
1991	Mobile Suit Gundam F91	Leahlee Edaberry, Leah Mariba	
1998	Batman & Mr. Freeze: SubZero	Summer Gleeson	Direct-to-video
2001	Sakura Wars: The Movie	Maria Tachibana	
2001	Digimon Tamers: Battle of Adventurers	Renamon, Kyubimon, Taomon	
2002	Digimon Tamers: Runaway Locomon	Renamon	
2004	The Nutcracker and the Mouseking	Nanny	
2004	Howl's Moving Castle	Honey	
2012	A Turtle's Tale 2: Sammy's Escape from Paradise	Woman	
2013	Leo the Lion	Leo's Mother	
2013	The Magic Snowflake	Shaman	
2014	Stand by Me Doraemon	Tamako Nobi	
2015	Digimon Adventure tri.	Togemon	
2018	The Son of Bigfoot	Mildred, Reporter	
2019	The Queen's Corgi	Elizabeth II	US dub

=== Video games ===
Year	Title	Role	Notes
1996	The Adventures of Batman & Robin Activity Center	Summer Gleeson	
1996	Descent II	Computer	
1997	Carmen Sandiego Word Detective	Carmen Sandiego	
1998	Carmen Sandiego Math Detective	Carmen Sandiego	
1998	Cardinal Syn	Syn	
2002	Digimon Rumble Arena	Renamon, Sakuyamon	
2007	Digimon World Data Squad	Renamon, Kyubimon, Taomon	

=== Other ===
- Adventures in Voice Acting
