= Kuromajo-san ga Toru!! =

Japanese children's novel series

- Cover for first novel volume, featuring protagonists Chiyoko "Choco" Kurotori (right) and Gyubid (left), and Megu Shion (center)

黒魔女さんが通る!!
- Genre: Magical girl
- Novel series
- Written by: Hiroshi Ishizaki
- Illustrated by: Kaori Fujita
- Published by: Kodansha
- Imprint: Aoi Tori Bunko
- Original run: July 2005 – February 2012
- Volumes: 15
- Anime television series
- Directed by: Tetsuo Yasumi
- Written by: Kimiko Ueno
- Music by: Junichirō Kabayama
- Studio: Shin-Ei Animation
- Original network: NHK-E
- Original run: April 4, 2012 – February 19, 2014
- Episodes: 60

Kuromajo-san ga Toru!! (黒魔女さんが通る!!) is a Japanese children's novel series written by Hiroshi Ishizaki and illustrated by Kaori Fujita. The series was launched on Kodansha's Aoi Tori Bunko imprint between July 2005 and February 2012, releasing 15 volumes during its run. An anime television adaptation by Shin-Ei Animation was broadcast in Japan from April 4, 2012 to February 19, 2014.

== Plot ==
Whilst attempting to read her friends' love horoscopes, Chiyoko 'Choco' Kurotori attempts to summon the messenger of love, Cupid. However, due to having a stuffed nose at the time, she mispronounces the name and inadvertently summons a black witch named Gyubid instead. As such, Gyubid decides to train Chiyoko to become a black witch herself, learning various magic spells whilst facing off against various occult mysteries.

== Characters ==
Chiyoko Kurotori (黒鳥 千代子, Kurotori Chiyoko)
Voiced by: Fumiko Orikasa
A fifth grade schoolgirl who is nicknamed "Choco" (チョコ, Choko) due to the similarities with her name. She is trained by Gyubid to become a black witch after accidentally summoning her while trying to summon Cupid with a stuffy nose. Whenever she is involved with something pertaining to the occult, she is often required to wear a loli gothic outfit.
Gyubid (ギュービッド, Gyūbiddo)
Voiced by: Romi Park
A beautiful but rather mischievous black witch who was inadvertently summoned by Choco and decides to train her to become a black witch.
Tōka Blossom (桃花・ブロッサム, Tōka Burossamu)
Voiced by: Airu Sakuno
A former junior student at the Black Witch Public Academy and Gyubid's underclassman by two years.
Kyou Oogata (大形京, Oogata Kyou)
Voiced by: Junko Noda
A former student of Angolmois and Choco's rival. His magic was sealed by Angolmois (a stuff animal puppet), but there are times the seal falls off.
Meg Shion (紫苑 メグ, Shion Megu)
Voiced by: Maria Yamamoto
Chiyoko's friend since kindergarten.
Mai Ichiro (一路 舞, Ichiro Mai)
Voiced by: Yuki Matsuoka
Chiyoko's classmate and class representative.
Yuri Haruno (春野百合, Haruno Yuri)
Voiced by: Mariko Mizuno
A girl who loves cats.
Shou Sanjou (三条 ショウ, Sanjō Shō)
Voiced by: Megumi Matsumoto
Naoki Kojima (小島 直樹, Kojima Naoki)
Voiced by: Misuzu Togashi
Chiyoko's classmate whose perverted tendencies have earnt him the nickname "Ero-Ace" (エロエース, Ero Ēsu).
Daigorou Iwata (岩田 大五郎, Iwata Daigorō)
Voiced by: Tomo Muranaka
Mr. Matsuoka (松岡先生, Matsuoka-sensei)
Voiced by: Junji Majima
Angolmois (アンゴルモア, Angorumoa)
Voiced by: Yumi Hikita
A former classmate of Gyubid's in Black Witch Public Academy and her boss.
Chikako Kurotori (黒鳥 千香子, Kurotori Chikako)
Voiced by: Naoko Kouda / Fumiko Orikasa (Child Thika)
Chiyoko's grandma. Her real name is Thika. She knows her granddaughter is a black witch, but doesn't tell her so she isn't intruding her secret. Thika is very knowledgeable about things related to the Spirit World and tends to help Choco without her noticing. It was revealed later that she used to be a student of the Black Witch Public Academy and was friends with Melusine and Gyubid's grandma's old sister, Gyubad. She was expelled because she broke one of the school's rules.
Taiyō Hinata (日向 太陽, Hinata Taiyō)
Voiced by: Saeko Zōgō

== Media ==
=== Novels ===
The original novel series written by Hiroshi Ishizaki and illustrated by Kaori Fujita was released on Kodansha's Aoi Tori Denki imprint between July 2004 and February 2012. Released over 15 volumes, the series has managed to sell over 2.6 million copies.

=== Anime ===
An anime television adaptation by Shin-Ei Animation has been produced for NHK Educational TV. The first season aired between April 4, 2012 and July 11, 2012, with the second season aired between from September 13, 2012 and February 19, 2014. The opening themes are "Doki Doki Shichau no Oh Yeah!" (Doki Doki しちゃうの Oh yeah!, A Heart Pounding Situation's Oh Yeah!) by Ayumu Shinga from April 2012 until March 2013, "Festi-Party" (フェスティパーリー, Fesuti Pārī) by Antenna girl from April 2013.
