= Digimon Tamers: Battle of Adventurers =

2001 film by Tetsuo Imazawa

- Theatrical release poster
- Japanese: デジモンテイマーズ 冒険者たちの戦い
- Revised Hepburn: Dejimon Teimāzu Bōkensha-tachi no Tatakai
- Directed by: Tetsuo Imazawa
- Screenplay by: Yasuko Kobayashi
- Based on: Digimon by Akiyoshi Hongo
- Starring: see below
- Cinematography: Yumiko Kajiwara
- Edited by: Shigeru Nishiyama
- Music by: Takanori Arisawa
- Production company: Toei Animation
- Distributed by: Toei Company, Ltd.
- Release date: July 14, 2001
- Running time: 50 minutes
- Country: Japan
- Language: Japanese
- Box office: $13.4 million

Digimon Tamers: Battle of Adventurers (Japanese: デジモンテイマーズ 冒険者たちの戦い, Hepburn: Dejimon Teimāzu Bōkensha-tachi no Tatakai) is a 2001 Japanese animated adventure film directed by Tetsuo Imazawa and written by Yasuko Kobayashi; the film is based on the Digimon franchise by Akiyoshi Hongo, and its third series, Digimon Tamers. Produced by Toei Animation and distributed by Toei Company, Battle of Adventurers is the fifth film in the franchise, and takes place during the Tamers' summer vacation, where Mephistomon sends Digimon to invade the Real World through a virus called the "V-Pet". Battle of Adventurers was released in Japan on July 14, 2001, as part of Toei Animation Summer 2001 Animation Fair, featuring alongside Mōtto! Ojamajo Doremi: The Secret of the Frog Stone and Kinnikuman: Second Generation films.

The film marks the first film for Digimon Tamers, and was followed by Runaway Locomon (2002).

== Plot ==
As Takato and Henry arrive at Okinawa for their summer trip, they part ways as Takato stays with his cousin Kai and his grandfather, while Henry visits the underwater ruins offshore. Meanwhile, Rika, who is staying home in Tokyo, fights a Pteramon at an oil plant; she and Renamon become suspicious of Pteramon's motives for attacking. The next morning, Takato, Kai, and Guilmon save a girl named Minami from Tylomon. Minami explains to Takato that she was being chased by many Digimon because her laptop carries the original prototype V-Pet, which was modeled after her late puppy, Mei. Much later, Scorpiomon and Divermon try to capture Minami. Seasarmon appears from the laptop screen and saves her, but Mantaraymon escapes with Minami.

Meanwhile, V-Pets are causing technical viruses around the globe, and taking over entire computer systems. Takato and the others go to the island where Minami is held captive. They find Minami's father, who reveals that the prototype V-Pet carries a vaccine program, and Tameshiro, the head of the V-Pet manufacturing company, is revealed to be a Digimon named Mephistomon that sent the Digimon to capture Minami. As Seasarmon tries to attack Mephistomon, he is bested and devolves to Labramon, resembling Mei. Henry and Rika arrive via Omnimon's help, who reveals that it has been hunting for Mephistomon from the beginning.

Takato and the others fight and seemingly delete Mephistomon, while Minami tearfully acknowledging a dying Labramon as "Mei" activates the vaccine, which cures the computer systems over the world. However, Mephistomon evolves into Gulfmon and overpowers the partner Digimon. Calumon enables the partner Digimon to digivolve to Ultimate-level and defeat Gulfmon, setting everything back to normal.

== Voice cast ==
Character	Japanese voice cast	English voice cast
Takato Matsuda (Takato Matsuki)	Makoto Tsumura	Brian Beacock
Guilmon	Masako Nozawa	Steve Blum
Lee Jianliang (Henry Wong)	Mayumi Yamaguchi	Dave Wittenberg
Terriermon	Aoi Tada	Mona Marshall
Ruki Makino (Rika Nonaka)	Fumiko Orikasa	Melissa Fahn
Renamon	Yuka Imai	Mari Devon
Culumon (Calumon)	Tomoko Kaneda	Brianne Siddall
Kai Urazoe	Tomo Saeki	Yuri Lowenthal (2005); Brian Donovan (2025)
Wataru Urazoe	Ginzō Matsuo	David Lodge
Minami Uehara	Kotono Mitsuishi	Stephanie Sheh
Seasarmon	Kyousei Tsukui	Tom Wyner
Mephistomon	Jūrōta Kosugi	Richard Epcar
Omegamon (Omnimon)	Chika Sakamoto; Mayumi Yamaguchi	Kirk Thornton; Lex Lang

== Production ==
The film is directed by Digimon series episode director Tetsuo Imazawa, with Yasuko Kobayashi providing the screenplay, and Tadayoshi Yamamuro providing the character designs and animation direction for the film. The film's ending theme song is "Moving On!" by AiM, which peaked at #95 on the Oricon Weekly Singles Chart. An insert song in the film, "Tomodachi no Umi" (トモダチの海), was performed by Sammy and released as a single on September 29, 2001.

== Release ==
The film was released in Japan on July 14, 2001, as part of Toei Animation Summer 2001 Animation Fair, and was featured along with Mōtto! Ojamajo Doremi: The Secret of the Frog Stone and Kinnikuman: Second Generation films. The film premiered on Jetix in the United States on September 16, 2005.

Discotek Media released the film on Blu-ray as part of the 2nd film collection alongside the Digimon Adventure 02 movie, Revenge of Diaboromon, and the second Tamers movie, Runaway Locomon.
