= Masako Nozawa =

Japanese actress (born 1936)

- 野沢 雅子
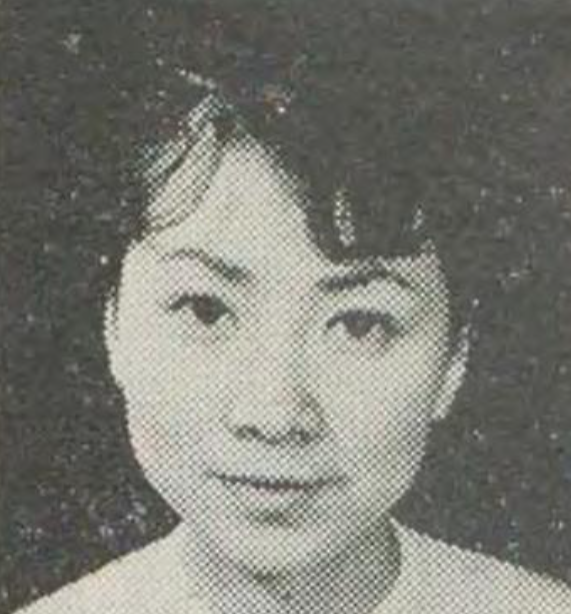
- Nozawa in 1962
- Born: October 25, 1936 (age 90); Arakawa, Tokyo, Empire of Japan
- Other name: Masako Tsukada (塚田 雅子)
- Occupations: Actress; voice actress
- Years active: 1939–present
- Agent: Aoni Production
- Notable work: Dragon Ball series as Son Goku, Son Gohan, Son Goten, Turles, Bardock, and Goku Black; GeGeGe no Kitarō as Kitarō; Galaxy Express 999 as Tetsurō Hoshino; Digimon Tamers as Guilmon
- Spouse: Masaaki Tsukada (died 2014)
- Children: 1
- Website: Official profile

Masako Nozawa (Japanese: 野沢 雅子, Hepburn: Nozawa Masako; born October 25, 1936) is a Japanese actress. Beginning work as a child actress at the age of three, by the time she became an adult, voice acting had inadvertently become her main occupation. Throughout her career, Nozawa has been affiliated with Production Baobab, 81 Produce, the self-owned Office Nozawa and Aoni Production. She is best known worldwide as the voice of Son Goku in the Dragon Ball franchise, beginning with its first animated adaptation in 1986. She also voices most of the character's male relatives, namely Son Gohan, Son Goten, and Bardock. Nozawa's other roles include Kitarō in GeGeGe no Kitarō (1968, 1971, 2008, 2017), Doraemon in the 1973 television series, and Tetsurō Hoshino in Galaxy Express 999 (1978, 1979).

A pioneer of voice acting in Japan, Nozawa is the first voice actor to be honored as a Person of Cultural Merit by the Japanese government and the first to win the Kikuchi Kan Prize. Her other accolades include an Animation Kobe Award, Tokyo Anime Award, Seiyu Award, Japanese Movie Critics Award and Japan Academy Film Prize. Her work voicing Goku in Dragon Ball video games has earned her two Guinness World Records, including for the longest video game voice acting career. Nozawa is a vice president of the Japan Actors Union. Her husband was fellow voice actor Masaaki Tsukada.

== Early life ==
Masako Nozawa was born on October 25, 1936, in the Nippori area of Arakawa, Tokyo, as the only child of painter Ryoshu Nozawa (the top disciple of Kawai Gyokudō) and housewife Tsuru (an orphaned daughter of a daimyo). Due to the influence of her aunt, Shochiku actress Kiyono Sasaki, Masako became a child actress at the age of three. Although she does not remember the titles of her earliest films, she said many depicted the love between a mother and her child. In 1944, the family moved to Numata, Gunma, to avoid the air raids of World War II. Nozawa lived in the city from the third grade of elementary school until she graduated high school.

Her first play was a school production of Umihiko Yamahiko in fifth grade, where she played the male role. Both of her parents loved kabuki and she studied Nihon-buyō, thus, Nozawa said she was never shy about being on stage. Despite her aunt's wishes, Nozawa pursued theater instead of film. When she obtained a copy of her family register to apply for high school, she learned that Tsuru was not her biological mother. Because Tsuru had had a miscarriage and could not give birth, her parents agreed to Ryoshu fathering a child with a woman he knew in order to continue the Nozawa family lineage. Upon this admission, Tsuru told Masako she had raised her as her own and would continue to do so, and likewise, Masako later said "There is no other mother for me than her."

== Career ==
In junior high school, Nozawa joined the Tougei Theater Company and worked as an actress in Tokyo during school holidays. She got in thanks to her aunt knowing a producer at NHK who gave a recommendation. Her first role was an elderly nurse in The Abortion Doctor, which the company gave her an award for. After graduating high school, she moved to Tokyo. She began voice acting in her late teens, in order to help support the struggling theater company. She said her first voice role was dubbing an Indian boy in a foreign film at 19. She explained, "It was the early days of television, and many foreign dramas were broadcast. At the time, voice dubbing was also done live, so using children to play boy roles was a concern. But adult men's voices have already changed, so women were chosen for child roles." Although she did not plan on it and had already done a lot of acting in television dramas, voice acting saw a boom and became Nozawa's main occupation. Her TV drama credits of the time include Akado Suzunosuke (1957) and Anmitsu Hime (1958).

Nozawa made her anime debut in Wolf Boy Ken (1963), and had a guest role on Astro Boy (1963). Her first regular role was in Uchuu Patrol Hopper (1965), and she went on to voice brothers Tonkichi and Kanta Hanamura in Sally the Witch (1966). Nozawa's first lead role was Kitarō in GeGeGe no Kitarō (1968), which she was selected for by series creator Shigeru Mizuki. It also marked the first time she did magazine interviews and her first fan event. For the 1973 adaptation of Doraemon, Nozawa took over the role of the title character from Kōsei Tomita, who had voiced the character for the first 13 episodes. She went on to voice Tetsurō Hoshino in Galaxy Express 999 (1978), again being selected by the work's original creator Leiji Matsumoto. Although she had reprised the role of Kitarō for the 1971 adaptation of GeGeGe no Kitarō, Nozawa did not do the same for its 1985 adaptation. This was due to Fuji TV having an unwritten rule that voice actors could not play more than one lead character at a time. However, she noted that this eventually resulted in her landing the role of Son Goku in Dragon Ball (1986), as otherwise she would not have even been allowed to audition. She was chosen to play Goku by Dragon Ball creator Akira Toriyama, who later stated that he would hear Nozawa's voice in his head when writing the original manga.

Nozawa led a lawsuit by 361 voice actors against Nippon Animation and its recording studio subsidiary Onkyo Eizo System in demand of unpaid royalties from DVD releases of anime series. After four years, a judge ruled in 2003 that Onkyo Eizo owed 87 million yen (US$796,000) to the actors, but dismissed the case against Nippon Animation as they deemed actor compensation to be the responsibility of the recording studio. Both parties appealed the decision. On August 25, 2004, the Tokyo High Court upheld the ruling against Onkyo Eizo and also found Nippon Animation liable, ordering both companies to pay the 87 million yen. The Supreme Court of Japan upheld the ruling in 2005. On April 1, 2006, Nozawa left 81 Produce to establish Office Nozawa. In 2012, she closed the self-owned talent agency. A number of voice actors who were affiliated with her agency went on to affiliate with Media Force.

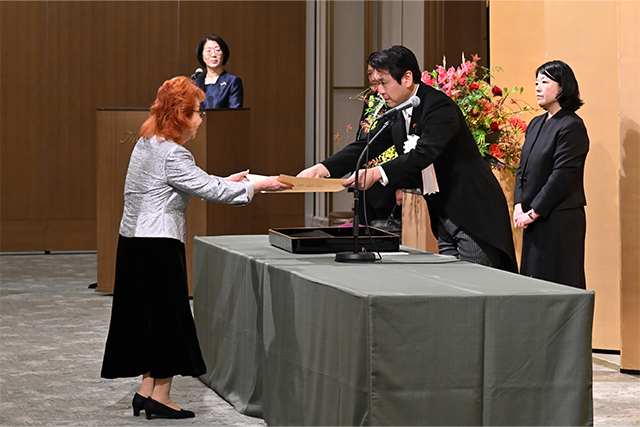
Nozawa receiving the Person of Cultural Merit certificate, 2025

In 2017, Guinness World Records presented Nozawa with two world records related to her voicing Son Goku in Dragon Ball video games for 23 years and 218 days; "longest video game voice acting career" and "voice actor who voiced the same character in a video game for the longest period". Two years later, Nozawa was included on Newsweek Japan's list of "100 Globally Respected Japanese People". In December 2023, Nozawa became the first voice actor to receive the Kikuchi Kan Prize in its 71-year history.

In October 2024, Aoni Production and artificial intelligence platform CoeFont announced that Nozawa was one of the voice actors that they would use vocal data from to create AI-replicated voices for use in virtual assistants, medical devices and robots. Planning to make it available in multiple languages, beginning with English and Chinese, the companies acknowledged the potential threat to actors' rights and livelihoods posed by AI, and promised not to use the data for performances in animation or similar works.

On October 17, 2025, she was selected as a Person of Cultural Merit by the Japanese government, becoming the first person in the voice acting profession to receive the distinction. In March 2026, she became the first voice actor to have a handprint added to the Star Handprints at Asakusa Public Hall. In April, Emperor Naruhito and Empress Masako recognized Nozawa's contributions in GeGeGe no Kitarō at the Imperial Garden Party by the Imperial Household Agency.

== Philosophy and technique ==
Nozawa said she initially preferred acting on stage because she could see the audience's reaction, but came to prefer voice acting in her 30s for "breathing life into things with only your voice." However, she noted she views the two jobs as essentially the same, only differing in name. Nozawa is extremely dedicated to her craft and is known for never being late. The only exception saw her show up to a morning recording session for Tiger Mask ten minutes late wearing ill-fitting clothing, and only afterwards explaining that her house had burned down that morning so she had to borrow clothes from a friend. Although she has sung some songs related to her acting roles, such as the theme to The Monster Kid, Nozawa said she is not a good singer and always tries to get out of it. In 2005, Nozawa said she had never turned an acting role down and had never regretted taking one either. Nozawa mainly plays young male characters. This originated in the early days of voice acting when the dubbing of foreign films was done live and actual boys could not be used; staff members would recommend and automatically cast her because they knew she had done it before. Nozawa also speculated this might be due to her childhood as a tomboy; she was the only girl having sword fights with the boys, and preferred that over playing with dolls.

When she goes to an audition, Nozawa does not create the character's voice beforehand, she improvises once she is in front of the microphone. However, after getting the role, she does think about the character's history and background and incorporates that into her acting. If it is an adaptation, she does not read the original work beforehand because she does not want to know what is going to happen so that the reactions in her performances are authenthic. She watches the works she is in when they air on television. For Dragon Ball specifically, she said she watches it twice; the first is simply as a fan for personal enjoyment, but the second is to critique her performance and see if there are adjustments that need to be made. During recording sessions, she avoids speaking with the actors who are playing enemy characters; "Of course, if someone talks to me, I respond, but I try not to initiate conversations myself."

In Dragon Ball, Nozawa is responsible for portraying Goku as well as his sons Gohan and Goten. When they have scenes together, she records the lines for all three in the same take, switching on the spot, rather than performing singular takes for each character. Her colleague Toshio Furukawa stated there is no one else who can do this, and Nozawa revealed that younger actors once asked her to stop because it gives the impression that anyone can. Nozawa helped create the unique way Goku speaks, which is known as "Goku language" (悟空語, Gokū-go). His famous phrase from anime adaptations, "Ossu! Ora Goku!" (オッス！オラ悟空！; 'Yo! I'm Goku!'), was ad-libbed by her during a recording session as a joke for the staff. However, she noted Toei Animation has somehow gone on to receive credit for creating it.

When asked about the voice acting industry in 2016, Nozawa said it had become formulaic and young actors lacked individuality, with everyone using the same "cute girl" voice for example. She speculated one of the reasons for this was due to voice acting schools. Although she had taught a few lessons before herself, Nozawa said those were largely reluctant on her part and she tries not to do it anymore because acting is not something that can be taught; "If you tell a rookie who doesn't know what to do, 'In this scene, you should act like this', everyone will act that way."

== Filmography ==
=== Television animation ===
1960s

- Wolf Boy Ken (1963)
- Astro Boy (1963) (Boy Robot)
- Obake no Q-tarō (1965) (Shin'ichi Ōhara)
- Sally, the Witch (1966) (Tonkichi Hanamura, Kanta Hanamura)
- GeGeGe no Kitarō (1968) (Kitarō)
- Star of the Giants (1968) (Baseball boy)
- Cyborg 009 (1968)
- Sabu to Ichi Torimono Hikae (1968)
- Attack No. 1 (1969) (Ryouko Higaki)
- Tiger Mask (1969) (Kenta)
- Marine Boy (1969)

1970s

- Inakappe Taishō (1970) (Daizaemon Kaze)
- Andersen Stories (1971) (Marco)
- GeGeGe no Kitarō (1971) (Kitarō)
- The Gutsy Frog (1972) (Hiroshi)
- Casshan (1973) (Māru)
- Dororon Enma-kun (1973) (Enma-kun)
- Doraemon (1973) (Doraemon, Botako)
- Calimero (1974) (Buta)
- Hoshi no Ko Poron (1974) (All Roles)
- Gamba no Bōken (1975) (Gamba)
- La Seine no Hoshi (1975) (Danton)
- Maya the Honey Bee (1975) (Willy)
- Combattler V (1976) (Ropet, Oreana, Kinta Ichinoki)
- Piccolino no Bōken (1976) (Pinocchio)
- Araiguma Rascal (1977) (Rascal)
- Ore wa Teppei (1977) (Teppei Uesugi)
- Galaxy Express 999 (1978) (Tetsurō Hoshino)

1980s

- The Adventures of Tom Sawyer (1980) (Tom Sawyer)
- The Monster Kid (1980) (Tarō Kaibutsu)
- Tsurikichi Sampei (1980) (Sampei)
- Beast King GoLion (1981) (Hiroshi Suzuishi, Honerva)
- Miss Machiko (1981) (Kenta Ikegami)
- Shin The Gutsy Frog (1981) (Hiroshi)
- Urusei Yatsura (1981) (Kintarō)
- The Mysterious Cities of Gold (1982) (Esteban)
- Ginga Hyōryū Vifam (1983) (Kentsu Norton)
- Igano Kabamaru (1983) (Sū Matsuno, Young Kabamaru Igano)
- Bumpety Boo (1986) (Bumbo)
- Dragon Ball (1986) (Son Goku)
- The Wonderful Wizard of Oz (1986) (Princess Ozma)
- Ai Shōjo Pollyanna Monogatari (1986) (Polly Harrington)
- Kamen no Ninja Akakage (1987) (Aokage)
- Let's Go! Anpanman (1988) (Shichū Obasan)
- Aoi Blink (1989) (Kakeru)
- Dash! Yonkuro (1989) (Yonkuro Hinomaru)
- Dragon Ball Z (1989) (Son Goku, Son Gohan, Bardock, Son Goten, Gotenks, Vegetto)

1990s

- Jungle Emperor (1990) (Gibo)
- Dragon Ball Z: Bardock – The Father of Goku (1990) (Bardock, Son Goku)
- Honō no Tōkyūji: Dodge Danpei (1991) (Chin'nen Kobotoke)
- Dragon Ball Z: The History of Trunks (1993) (Son Gohan)
- Dragon Ball GT (1996) (Son Goku, Son Gohan, Son Goten, Gogeta, Son Goku Jr.)
- Dual! Parallel Trouble Adventure (1999) (Urara Nanjōin)
- Alice SOS (1999)

2000s

- Trotting Hamtaro (2000) (Ohamuba-san, Roko-chan's Grandma)
- Love Hina (2000) (Hina Urashima)
- Kindaichi Case Files (2000) (Tomoyo Konta)
- One Piece (2001) (Dr. Kureha)
- Digimon Tamers (2001) (Guilmon, Dukemon, Narrator)
- Great Detective Conan (2001) (Furuyo Senma)
- Rockman EXE Beast+ (2002) (Electel Mama)
- Mirmo! (2003) (Kinta)
- Astro Boy (2004) (Anga)
- Digital Monster X-Evolution (2005) (Dukemon)
- Pokémon: Advanced (2005) (Masamune)
- Tsubasa Chronicle (2005) (Kaigyo)
- Kirarin Revolution (2006) (Grandmother)
- Love Get Chu (2006) (Takemiya-sensei)
- Naruto (2006) (Old Woman in Eps. 187–188)
- Digimon Data Squad (2007) (Dukemon)
- Hatara Kizzu Maihamu Gumi (2007) (Gaudi)
- Hakaba Kitarō (2008) (Kitarō)
- Cross Game (2009) (Nomo)
- Dragon Ball Kai (2009) (Son Goku, Son Gohan, Bardock, Son Goten, Gotenks, Vegetto)
- Marie & Gali (2009) (Marie Curie)
- Shugo Chara!! Doki- (2009) (Haruki Maruyama in Ep. 75)

2010s

- Yumeiro Patissiere (2010) (French Chairwoman)
- Keroro Gunso (2011) (Orara)
- Nichijou (2011) (Frill-necked lizard in Ep. 10)
- Tanken Driland (2012) (Bonny)
- One Piece (2013) (Son Goku, Son Gohan, Son Goten)
- Toriko (2013) (Son Goku, Son Gohan, Son Goten)
- Ping Pong (2014) (Obaba)
- Dragon Ball Super (2015) (Son Goku, Son Gohan, Son Goten, Gotenks, Goku Black, Vegetto)
- Seiyu's Life! (2015) (Herself)
- Rage of Bahamut (2017) (Ryuuzoku Zokuchou)
- Overlord (2018) (Rigrit in episode 15)
- GeGeGe no Kitarō (2018) (Medama-oyaji)
- Mr. Tonegawa: Middle Management Blues (2018) ("Zawa... Voice (001)" in Ep. 24)
- Shinya! Tensai Bakabon (2018) (Herself in Ep. 1)
- Hozuki's Coolheadedness (2018) (Magical Marin)

2020s

- Digimon Adventure (2020) (Narrator, YukimiBotamon)
- The Foolish Angel Dances with the Devil (2024) (Joe)
- Mysterious Disappearances (2024) (Station Attendant)
- Go! Go! Loser Ranger! (2024) (Draggie-kun)
- Dragon Ball Daima (2024) (Son Goku, Son Gohan, Son Goten)
- Sanda (2025) (Toyo Tetsudome)
- Baki-Dou (2026) (Sabuko Tokugawa)
- The 100 Girlfriends Who Really, Really, Really, Really, Really Love You (2026) (Yukiko Nozawa)
- Dragon Ball Super: Beerus (2026) (Son Goku, Son Gohan, Son Goten)
- Ranma ½ (2026) (Grand Master)
- Dragon Ball Super: The Galactic Patrol (TBA) (Son Goku)

=== Original video animation (OVA) ===
- The Hakkenden (1990) (Kamezasa)
- Dragon Ball Z Side Story: Plan to Eradicate the Saiyans (1993) (Son Goku, Son Gohan, Turles)
- Iczer Girl Iczelion (1995) (Iczel)
- Dragon Ball: Yo! Son Goku and His Friends Return!! (2008) (Son Goku, Son Gohan, Son Goten, Gotenks)
- Dragon Ball: Plan to Eradicate the Super Saiyans (2010) (Son Goku, Son Gohan, Turles)
- One Piece Film Strong World Episode: 0 (2010) (Dr. Kureha)
- Dragon Ball: Episode of Bardock (2011) (Bardock)

=== Original net animation (ONA) ===
- Super Dragon Ball Heroes (2018) (Son Goku, Son Goku Xeno)
- Star Wars: Visions (2021) (T0-B1)

=== Theatrical animation ===
- Flying Phantom Ship (1969) (Hayato)
- 30,000 Miles Under the Sea (1970) (Isamu)
- Galaxy Express 999 (1979) (Tetsurō Hoshino)
- Bōkenshatachi: Gamba to 7-biki no Nakama (1984) (Gamba)
- Dragon Ball: Curse of the Blood Rubies (1986) (Son Goku)
- Dragon Ball: Sleeping Princess in Devil's Castle (1987) (Son Goku)
- Dragon Ball: Mystical Adventure (1988) (Son Goku)
- Hare Tokidoki Buta (1988) (Yamada-san)
- Dragon Ball Z: Dead Zone (1989) (Son Goku, Son Gohan)
- Kiki's Delivery Service (1989) (Tombo's friend with pink shirt and red jacket)
- Dragon Ball Z: The World's Strongest (1990) (Son Goku, Son Gohan)
- Dragon Ball Z: The Tree of Might (1990) (Son Goku, Son Gohan, Tullece)
- Kim's Cross (1990) (Kim Sae-Fan)
- Dragon Ball Z: Lord Slug (1991) (Son Goku, Son Gohan)
- Dragon Ball Z: Cooler's Revenge (1991) (Son Goku, Son Gohan, Bardock)
- Dragon Ball Z: The Return of Cooler (1992) (Son Goku, Son Gohan)
- Dragon Ball Z: Super Android 13! (1992) (Son Goku, Son Gohan)
- Dragon Ball Z: Broly – The Legendary Super Saiyan (1993) (Son Goku, Son Gohan)
- Dragon Ball Z: Bojack Unbound (1993) (Son Goku, Son Gohan)
- Dragon Ball Z: Broly – Second Coming (1994) (Son Goku, Son Gohan, Son Goten)
- Dragon Ball Z: Bio-Broly (1994) (Son Goku, Son Goten)
- Dragon Ball Z: Fusion Reborn (1995) (Son Goku, Son Gohan, Son Goten, Gogeta, Gotenks)
- Dragon Ball Z: Wrath of the Dragon (1995) (Son Goku, Son Gohan, Son Goten, Gotenks)
- Dragon Ball: The Path to Power (1996) (Son Goku)
- Doraemon: Nobita Drifts in the Universe (1999) (Rogu)
- Ojarumaru (2000) (Semira)
- Digimon Tamers: Battle of Adventurers (2001) (Guilmon)
- Digimon Tamers: Runaway Locomon (2002) (Guilmon)
- Doraemon: Nobita in the Robot Kingdom (2002) (Kururimpa)
- Oshare Majo Love and Berry: Shiawase no Mahou (2007) (Headmistress Izabera)
- Asura (2012) (Asura)
- Doraemon: Nobita and the Island of Miracles—Animal Adventure (2012) (Young Nobisuke Nobi)
- Dragon Ball Z: Battle of Gods (2013) (Son Goku, Son Gohan, Son Goten, Gotenks)
- Dragon Ball Z: Resurrection 'F' (2015) (Son Goku, Son Gohan)
- Gamba: Gamba to Nakama-tachi (2015) (Tsuburi)
- Kaze no Yō ni (2016) (Sanpei)
- Kimi no Koe wo Todoketai (2017) (Nagisa's grandmother)
- Yo-kai Watch Shadowside: Oni-ō no Fukkatsu (2017) (Kitarō)
- Pokémon the Movie: The Power of Us (2018) (Hisui)
- Dragon Ball Super: Broly (2018) (Son Goku, Son Goten, Gogeta, Bardock)
- Weathering with You (2019) (Fortune-teller)
- Dragon Ball Super: Super Hero (2022) (Son Goku, Son Gohan, Son Goten, Gotenks)
- Birth of Kitarō: The Mystery of GeGeGe (2023) (Medama-oyaji)
- Me & Roboco (2025) (Roboco)

=== Video games ===
- Dragon Ball series (Son Goku, Son Gohan, Bardock, Son Goten, Turles, Vegetto, Gotenks, Gogeta, Goku Black)
- Digimon Park (Guilmon)
- Digimon Tamers Battle Evolution (Guilmon)
- Digimon Racing (Guilmon)
- Digimon Battle Chronicle (Guilmon)
- One Piece series (Dr. Kureha)
- Battle Stadium D.O.N (Son Goku, Son Gohan)
- Super Robot Wars series (Oreana, Ropet, Cyclaminos)
- Egg Monster Hero 4 (Four-Dimensional Empress)
- Final Fantasy Type-0 (Commissar, Eumgyeong)
- Kingdom Hearts series (Merryweather)
- League of Legends (Wukong)
- The Legend of Zelda: Skyward Sword (Old Woman)
- Majogami (Storyteller)
- PoPoRoGue (Gilda)
- J-Stars Victory VS (Son Goku)
- Jump Force (Son Goku)

=== Puppet shows ===
- Nobi Nobi Non-chan (1990–1996) (Tame-kun, Ana-chan's mother, Kitsune's granny)
- Zawa Zawa Mori no Ganko-chan (1996–) (Kero-chan)

=== Dubbing roles ===
==== Live-action ====
- Babe (2002 NTV edition) (Esmé Hoggett (Magda Szubanski))
- Babe: Pig in the City (2004 NTV edition) (Esmé Hoggett (Magda Szubanski))
- End of Days (2001 TV Asahi edition) (Mabel (Miriam Margolyes))
- The Goonies (1988 TBS edition) (Clark, a.k.a., "Mouth" (Corey Feldman))
- Indiana Jones and the Temple of Doom (Short Round (Ke Huy Quan))
- Last Action Hero (1996 Fuji TV edition) (Danny Madigan (Austin O'Brien))
- Little Fockers (Dina Byrnes (Blythe Danner))
- Meet the Fockers (Dina Byrnes (Blythe Danner))
- Meet the Parents (Dina Byrnes (Blythe Danner))
- Ordinary People (Beth Jarrett (Mary Tyler Moore))
- The Poseidon Adventure (Robin Shelby (Eric Shea))
- Richie Rich (Richie (Macaulay Culkin))
- Switch (Maggie Philbin (Sharon Gless))
- To Kill a Mockingbird (1972 NET edition) (Jem Finch (Phillip Alford))
- Vanishing on 7th Street (James Leary (Jacob Latimore))

==== Animation ====
- Sleeping Beauty (1995 Buena Vista edition) (Merryweather)
- Maya the Bee (2014) (Willy)
- Maya the Bee: The Honey Games (Willy)
- The Croods (Gran Crood)
- The Croods: A New Age (Gran Crood)
- Migration (Erin)
- Zootopia 2 (2025) (Judy's grandmother)

== Live-action ==
- Akado Suzunosuke (1957)
- Anmitsu Hime (1958)
- Ambassador Magma (1967) (Gam's voice in episodes 41 and 42)
- Robot 110-Ban (1977) (Gan-chan's voice)
- Ultraman Story (1984) (young Ultraman Taro's voice)
- Super Voice World: Yume to Jiyū to Happening (2001, DVD)
- Onward Towards Our Noble Deaths (2007, TV) (Kitarō's voice)
- Blue Fire (2014, TV) (Tetsurō Hoshino's voice)
- Sono Koe no Anata e (2022, film) (Herself)
- Toki ni wa Mukashi no Hanashi o (2022, film) (Herself)

== Audio ==
- Seishun Adventure: Fūshin Engi (NHK-FM) (Nataku)
- CD Theater: Dragon Quest (Merusera)
- Doraemon Ondō (King Records cover)

== Others ==
- Law of Ueki commercial for Shōnen Sunday (????) (Kousuke Ueki)
- Naruhodo! The World (????) (narration)
- NHK Kyōiku: Kagaku Daisukishi you Jaku (????) (narration)
- Dream 9 Toriko & One Piece & Dragon Ball Z Super Collaboration Special!! (2013) (Son Goku, Son Gohan and Son Goten)
- Himitsu Kessha Taka no Tsume EX (2014, home video extra) (All eight characters)
- Wakasa Seikatsu commercial (????) (narration)
- The Wide Friday Ranking (????) (narration)
- 76th NHK Kōhaku Uta Gassen (2025) (as a judge)

== Awards and accolades ==
Year	Award	Category	Result	Ref
1980	1st Anime Grand Prix	Best Female Voice Actor	4th place	
1980	2nd Anime Grand Prix	Best Female Voice Actor	6th place	
1981	3rd Anime Grand Prix	Best Female Voice Actor	10th place	
1982	4th Anime Grand Prix	Best Female Voice Actor	8th place	
1983	5th Anime Grand Prix	Best Female Voice Actor	13th place	
1987	9th Anime Grand Prix	Best Female Voice Actor	17th place	
1988	10th Anime Grand Prix	Best Female Voice Actor	14th place	
1989	11th Anime Grand Prix	Best Female Voice Actor	10th place	
1990	12th Anime Grand Prix	Best Female Voice Actor	7th place	
1991	13th Anime Grand Prix	Best Female Voice Actor	6th place	
1992	14th Anime Grand Prix	Best Voice Actor	4th place	
1993	15th Anime Grand Prix	Best Voice Actor	14th place	
1994	16th Anime Grand Prix	Best Voice Actor	18th place	
1997	2nd Animation Kobe Awards	Special Award	Won	
2012	8th Tokyo Anime Awards	Merit Award	Won	
2013	7th Seiyu Awards	Achievement Award	Won	
2016	Guinness World Records	World Record (Longest video game voice acting career)	Won	
2016	Guinness World Records	World Record (Longest period voicing the same character in video games)	Won	
2017	26th Japanese Movie Critics Awards	Best Voice Actor	Won	
2018	Minister of Health, Labour and Welfare Special Awards	Child Welfare Culture Award	Won	
2021	24th Japan Media Arts Festival	Distinguished Service Award	Won	
2022	45th Japan Academy Film Prize	Distinguished Service Award	Won	
2023	71st Kikuchi Kan Prize		Won	
2025	66th Mainichi Art Award	Special Award	Won	
2025	Person of Cultural Merit		Honored	
2026	77th NHK Broadcasting Culture Awards		Honored	
