= Dave Wittenberg =

South African actor

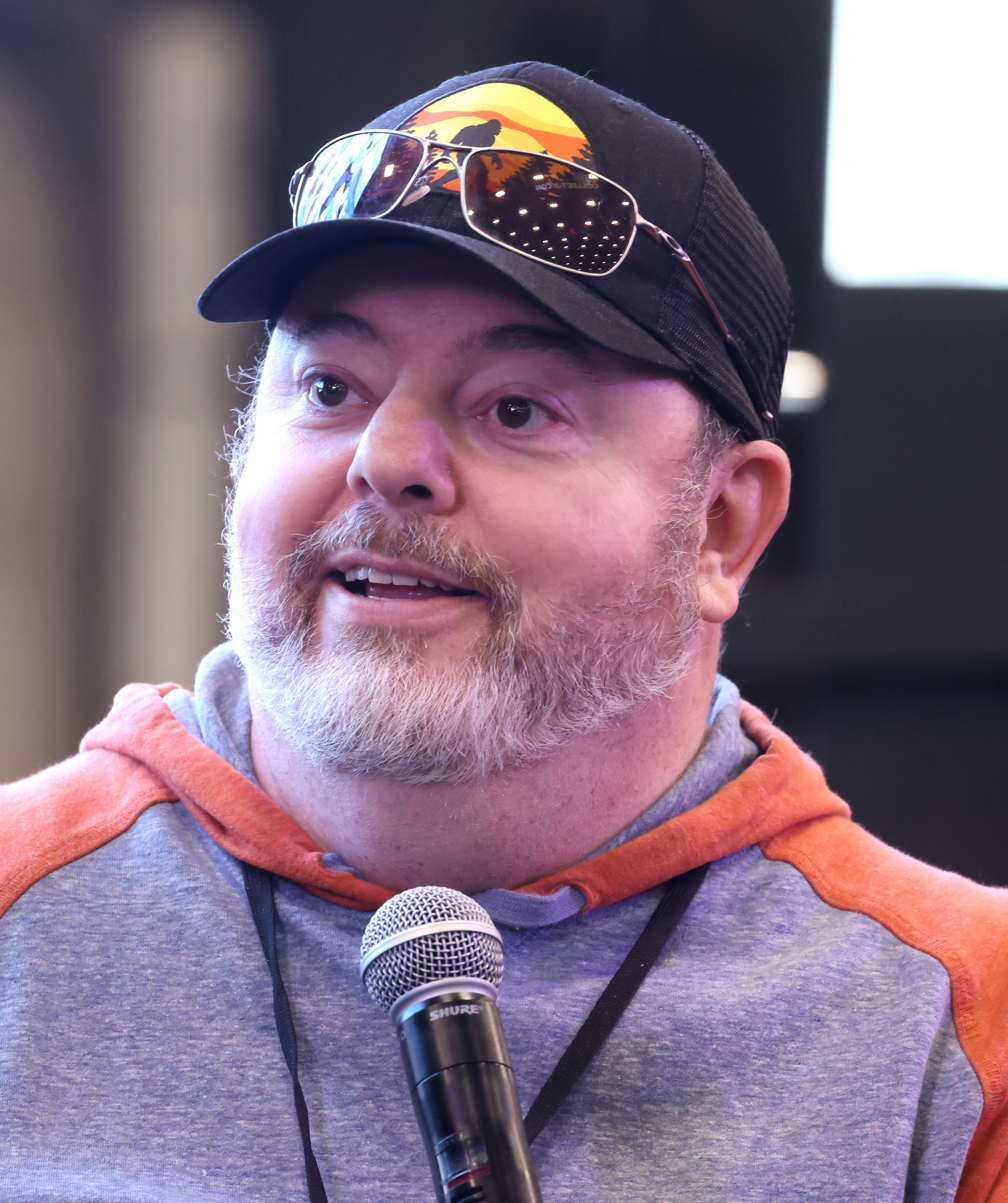
- Wittenberg in 2026
- Born: Johannesburg, South Africa
- Other name: Dave Lelyveld
- Occupations: Voice actor; scriptwriter
- Years active: 1997–present
- Website: davewittenberg.com

Dave Wittenberg is a South African voice actor. He is known for his voice acting in animated series and the English dub of anime.

== Early life ==
Wittenberg was born in Johannesburg, South Africa.

== Career ==
Wittenberg voices Kakashi Hatake in Naruto, Michael Lee in Witch Hunter Robin, Upchuck in the original Ben 10 series. Bash Johnson in Randy Cunningham: 9th Grade Ninja, Franz's singing voice in the Disney animated film Planes, Vision in Marvel Heroes, Lang Rangler in JoJo's Bizarre Adventure: Stone Ocean, and Time Baby in Gravity Falls. In video games, he voices Trigger Happy in the Skylanders series, Mad Doctor in Epic Mickey, and Buddy Alexander in Resident Evil: Damnation.

He is also an adaptive scriptwriter for English dubs of anime whose work includes episodes of Digimon. Wittenberg also narrates many documentaries and specials for the Travel Channel and Food Network.

== Filmography ==
=== Anime ===
List of English dubbing performances in anime
Year	Title	Role	Notes	Source
2001–02	Digimon Tamers	Henry Wong, MegaGargomon (shared with Mona Marshall), Sovereign Ebonwumon		
2002	Kurogane Communication	Kanato	As Dave Lelyveld	
2002	Babel II: Beyond Infinity	Koichi Kamiya / Babel II	As Dave Lelyveld	
2002	Digimon Frontier	Various characters		
2002	X	Subaru Sumeragi	As Dave Lelyveld	
2002	Fushigi Yûgi Eikoden	Taka Sukunami	As Dave Lelyveld	
2003	.hack//SIGN	Sora		
2003	Please Teacher!	Kei Kusanagi		
2003	The Twelve Kingdoms	Enki	As Dave Lelyveld	
2003	Android Kikaider: The Animation	Jiro / Kikaider	Also Kikaider 01 OVA as Dave Lelyveld	
2003–04	Ai Yori Aoshi series	Kaoru Hanabishi	As Dave Lelyveld	
2003–04	Initial D	Takumi "Tak" Fujiwara	Tokyopop dub	
2003–08	SD Gundam Force	Guneagle		
2004	Astro Boy	Various characters		
2004	Witch Hunter Robin	Michael Lee		
2004	.hack//Legend of the Twilight	Hotaru's Grunty		
2004	Gad Guard	Katana	As Dave Lelyveld	
2004	Here is Greenwood	Shinobu Tezuka	As Dave Lelyveld; Media Blasters dub	
2004	Stellvia	Masaru Odawara	As Dave Lelyveld	
2004	Submarine 707R	Senta Umino	As Dave Lelyveld	
2004	Please Twins!	Kei Kusanagi		
2004–05	Ghost in the Shell: Stand Alone Complex series	Saito	Also 2nd Gig	
2005	Zatch Bell!	Parco Folgore, Ponygon, Dufort	American Anime Award for Best Male Actor in a Comedy	
2005–06	Immortal Grand Prix	Jan Michael, Timma, Frank Bullitt		
2005–09	Naruto	Kakashi Hatake		
2006	Karas: The Prophecy	Kure		
2006–07	Eureka Seven	Woz, various		
2006–07	Haré+Guu	Uighur	As David Lelyveld	
2007	Digimon Data Squad	Kouki, BioThunderbirmon, BioDarkdramon		
2007–08	Blood+	Solomon and Karman		
2008–09	Code Geass	Gino Weinberg		
2009–19	Naruto: Shippuden	Kakashi Hatake		
2011	X-Men	Kick, Neuron		
2012–13	Tiger & Bunny	Doc Saito		
2019–24	Boruto: Naruto Next Generations	Kakashi Hatake		
2020	Marvel Future Avengers	Norman Osborn / Green Goblin		
2020–22	Ghost in the Shell: SAC 2045	Saito		
2021	JoJo's Bizarre Adventure: Stone Ocean	Lang Rangler		
2024	Code Geass: Rozé of the Recapture	Gino Weinberg		

=== Animation ===
List of voice performances in animation
Year	Title	Role	Notes	Source
2004	Stroker and Hoop	Various characters		
2004	Higglytown Heroes	The Musher		
2005	Duck Dodgers	Dodger's Id, Protectorate Agent	Episode: "A Lame Duck Mind"	
2005–07	The Grim Adventures of Billy & Mandy	Various characters		
2005–08	Codename: Kids Next Door	Numbuh 74.239, various characters		
2006–07	Ben 10	Upchuck, Harold, Road Rage	4 episodes	
2007	Legion of Super Heroes	Ferro Lad, Grullug	3 episodes	
2007	Family Guy	Various characters	Episode: "Road to Rupert"	
2007–10	Chowder	Gorgonzola, Larry Jingleberry, The Fly, various characters	6 episodes	
2008	Underfist: Halloween Bash	Bun-Bun		
2008–09	The Replacements	Dr. Scorpius	4 episodes	
2010	Generator Rex	The Instigator, Blue Collar Worker	Episode: "The Hunter"	
2010–12	Fish Hooks	Punt and Geckcoach		
2011	The Super Hero Squad Show	Miek, Korg	Episode: "Planet Hulk! (Six Against Infinity, Part 5)"	
2012	Motorcity	Cyborg Dan, Weekend Warriors Leader, various		
2012; 2014–15	Gravity Falls	Time Baby, Lolph	3 episodes	
2012–15	Randy Cunningham: 9th Grade Ninja	Bash Johnson		
2014–15; 2017	Clarence	Marty, Walt, Kevin		
2017	Transformers: Robots in Disguise	Wildbreak	4 episodes	
2017	Bunnicula	Ghost Pepper	Episode: "Ghost Pepper"	
2018	Be Cool, Scooby-Doo!	Northrup, Dad	Episode: "World of Witchcraft"	
2018	Guardians of the Galaxy	Pike, Announcer	Episode: "Money Changes Everything"	
2021	Monsters at Work	Fan Monster, additional voices		

=== Films ===
List of voice and English dubbing performances in direct-to-videos and television specials
Year	Title	Role	Notes	Source
2002	Gundress	Ryo	As Dave Lelyveld	
2002	Cowboy Bebop: The Movie	Lee Samson		
2003	Patlabor WXIII	Shinichiro Hata	As Dave Lelyveld	
2003	Cardcaptor Sakura Movie 2: The Sealed Card	Kerberos (big)	As Dave Lelyveld	
2004	Appleseed	Yoshitsune	As Dave Lelyveld	
2004	éX-Driver	Michael (movie), Toma (Danger Zone)	As Dave Lelyveld	
2004	Mobile Suit Gundam F91	Dorel Ronah	As Dave Lelyveld	
2005	Digimon Tamers: Battle of Adventurers	Henry Wong		
2005	Digimon Tamers: Runaway Locomon	Henry Wong		
2005	Digimon Frontier: Island of Lost Digimon	Takuya Kanbara		
2006	Final Fantasy VII: Advent Children	Yazoo		
2006	Codename: Kids Next Door - Operation Z.E.R.O.	Young Numbuh Zero/ Monty Uno, Sector Z Operative		
2007	Naruto the Movie: Ninja Clash in the Land of Snow	Kakashi Hatake		
2007	Ghost in the Shell: Stand Alone Complex - Solid State Society	Saito		
2007	Billy & Mandy: Wrath of the Spider Queen	Velma's dad, Spider		
2007	Ben 10: Secret of the Omnitrix	Upchuck, Alien #2		
2007	The Grim Adventures of the KND	Numbuh 74.239		
2008	Dragon Hunters	Hector		
2008	Naruto the Movie: Guardians of the Crescent Moon Kingdom	Kakashi Hatake		
2009	Naruto Shippuden the Movie	Kakashi Hatake, Gitai		
2011	Scooby-Doo! Legend of the Phantosaur	Cop, Grad Student, Policeman, miscellaneous bikers		
2011	Naruto Shippuden the Movie: Bonds	Kakashi Hatake		
2012	Resident Evil: Damnation	Buddy / Alexander "Sasha" Kozachenko		
2012	Naruto Shippuden the Movie: The Will of Fire	Kakashi Hatake		
2012	Delhi Safari	Hyena, Tortoise		
2013	Tiger & Bunny: The Beginning	Doc Saito		
2013	Naruto Shippuden the Movie: The Lost Tower	Young Kakashi		
2014	Naruto the Movie: Blood Prison	Kakashi Hatake		
2014	Road to Ninja: Naruto the Movie	Kakashi Hatake, Gamariki		
2015	Tiger & Bunny: The Rising	Doc Saito		
2015	The Last: Naruto the Movie	Kakashi Hatake		

=== Video games ===
List of voice and English dubbing performances in video games
Year	Title	Role	Notes	Source
2000–05	Tony Hawk's series	Various characters	Over 24 characters Pro Skater 2, 3, 4; Underground 1 and 2	
2002	Digimon Rumble Arena	Henry Wong		
2003	Xenosaga series	Allen Ridgeley		
2003	.hack series	Sora	Mutation – Quarantine	
2003	Castlevania: Lament of Innocence	Leon Belmont		
2003	Metal Arms: Glitch in the System	Glitch	Also script writer	
2003–05	The Lord of the Rings games	Goblin King, Warriors of Gondor, Orcs, Gollum (War of the Ring)		
2004	Seven Samurai 20XX	Matty		
2004	SD Gundam Force: Showdown!	Guneagle, Gundiver 02	as David Lelyveld	
2004	Medal of Honor: Pacific Assault	Tommy Conlin		
2004	EverQuest II	Various characters	Over 30 voices	
2004	Fight Club	Jack		
2004	Viewtiful Joe 2	Cameo Leon	Credited as Dave Whittenburg	
2005	Xenosaga Episode II	Allen Ridgeley, Luis Virgil, U-TIC Soldiers		
2005	Rave Master	Pasha		
2005	X-Men Legends II: Rise of Apocalypse	Angel / Archangel		
2005	Zatch Bell! series	Folgore, Ponygon		
2005	Gun	Soapy Jennings		
2005	Shin Megami Tensei: Digital Devil Saga & 2	Cielo		
2005	Ultimate Spider-Man	Various characters		
2006	Dead Rising	Sam Franklin	As Dave Wittenburg	
2006	Scooby Doo: Frights! Camera! Mystery!	Duncan Vibes, Terrance Patel		
2006	.hack//G.U. Vol. 1: Rebirth	Gaspard, Matsu	English Voice	
2006	Marvel: Ultimate Alliance	Gladiator, Balder, Wrecker, Wyatt Wingfoot		
2006–present	Naruto series	Kakashi Hatake	until Naruto Shippuden: Ultimate Ninja Storm 4, reprise his role in Naruto x Boruto: Ultimate Ninja Storm Connections	
2007	Armored Core 4	Zanni, Launch Site Staff Member		
2007	.hack//G.U. Vol. 2: Reminisce	Gaspard, Matsu, Osamu Kawaguchi	English Voice	
2007	Tomb Raider: Anniversary	Larson Conway		
2007	.hack//G.U. Vol. 3: Redemption	Gaspard, Matsu	English Voice	
2008	The Incredible Hulk	Special Forces Soldier, Vulcan Leader		
2008	Valkyria Chronicles	Welkin Gunther	English Voice	
2008	Destroy All Humans! Path of the Furon	Deep Naval, Murray		
2008	Persona 4	Teddie / Shadow Teddie		
2009	Eat Lead: The Return of Matt Hazard	Bill the Wizard, Yakuza Guard, Employee Artist		
2009	The Chronicles of Riddick: Assault on Dark Athena	Guard		
2009	Dissidia: Final Fantasy	Kefka Palazzo		
2009	Halo 3: ODST	Mike Branley		
2009	Prinny: Can I Really Be the Hero?	Prinny		
2009	Ratchet & Clank Future: A Crank in Time	Fongoid Male #3		
2009	Magna Carta 2	Igton Pin		
2010	Final Fantasy XIII	Lieutenant Amodar	English Voice	
2010	Valkyria Chronicles II	Welkin Gunther		
2010	Majin and the Forsaken Kingdom	Tepeu		
2010	Epic Mickey	The Mad Doctor		
2011	Bulletstorm	Ratface, Creeps		
2011	Dissidia 012: Final Fantasy	Kefka Palazzo		
2011	Transformers: Dark of the Moon: The Game	Mirage		
2011	Dead Island	Bobby, various characters		
2011-16	Skylanders series	Trigger Happy, Trigger Snappy, Hektore (3DS exclusive)		
2012	Final Fantasy XIII-2	Captain Cryptic, Amodar		
2012	Resident Evil 6	BSAA		
2012	Persona 4 Golden	Shadow Teddie (archival audio from Persona 4)		
2013	Marvel Heroes	Vision, Toad		
2013	Ratchet & Clank: Into the Nexus	Thug #2		
2015	Batman: Arkham Knight	Officer Denheen, Officer Lynch, B.P.D. Officers		
2015	Disney Infinity 3.0	Additional Voices		
2016	Mighty No. 9	Dr. Sanda, Seijiro Sanda		
2017	.hack//G.U. Last Recode	Gaspard and Matsu		
2018	Dissidia Final Fantasy NT	Kefka Palazzo		
2019	Judgment	Additional voices		
2020	Spider-Man: Miles Morales	Street Criminals		
2024	Like a Dragon: Infinite Wealth	Additional voices		
2024	The Legend of Heroes: Trails Through Daybreak	Citizens		

- .hack//INFECTION – Sora
- .hack//MUTATION – Sora
- .hack//OUTBREAK – Sora
- .hack//QUARANTINE – Sora
- Aliens versus Predator – All Narration
- Assassin's Creed Revelations – Additional voices
- Baroque – Coffin Man, Koriel Member (uncredited)
- Buffy the Vampire Slayer: Chaos Bleeds – Assorted Vampires
- Company of Heroes – Airborne (night), Various voices
- Command & Conquer 3: Tiberium Wars – Nod Shadow Team, Nod Raider Buggy, additional voices
- Command & Conquer 3: Kane's Wrath – Kane's assistant (live action performance), additional voices
- Dead Rising – Ed Deluca, James Ramsey, Sam Franklin, additional voices
- Diablo III – Additional voices
- Diablo III: Reaper of Souls – Additional voices
- Digimon Rumble Arena – Henry Wong
- Epic Mickey 2: The Power of Two – Additional voices
- Fight Club – Additional voices
- Final Fantasy Type-0 HD – Additional voices
- Ghost in the Shell: Stand Alone Complex – Saito
- God of War III – Civilians and Soldiers
- Lightning Returns: Final Fantasy XIII – Additional voices
- Mass Effect – Additional voices
- Medal of Honor: Rising Sun – Additional voices
- Prototype – Additional voices
- Prototype 2 – Additional voices
- Rage – Additional voices
- Rave Master – Pasha
- SOCOM U.S. Navy SEALs: Fireteam Bravo 3 – "RAVEN"
- Spider-Man: Shattered Dimensions – Additional voices
- Tangled: The Video Game – Additional voices
- The Incredible Hulk – Additional voices
- Tomb Raider: Anniversary – Larson Conway
- Tony Hawk's Pro Skater 2 – Additional voices
- Tony Hawk's Pro Skater 3 – Additional voices
- Tony Hawk's Pro Skater 4 – Additional voices
- Too Human – Frey, Hanz, Wolf Trooper, Patron
- X-Men Origins: Wolverine – Additional voices

=== Live-action ===
- Versus - Suit (English dub, credited as Dave Levyland)
- The Do's and Don'ts of Cruising - Narrator

== Other ==
- Cruising Do's and Dont's - Narrator
- I Didn't Know I Was Pregnant - Narrator
- Unbeatable Banzuke - Announcer (USA)
- Mystery ER - Narrator
- Ninja Warrior – Announcer (USA)
- WordGirl – Hosted (USA)
