= Hakaba Kitarō (TV series) =

2008 anime television series

- Genre: Drama; Horror; Animation; Satire
- Based on: Hakaba Kiratō by Shigeru Mizuki
- Written by: Yoshimi Narita
- Directed by: Kimitoshi Chioka
- Voices of: Masako Nozawa; Isamu Tanonaka; Chikao Ōtsuka
- Music by: Kaoru Wada
- Opening theme: "Mononoke Dance" by Denki Groove
- Ending theme: "Snow Tears" by Shoko Nakagawa
- Country of origin: Japan
- Original language: Japanese
- No. of episodes: 11

Production
- Producers: Atsuya Takase; Kosuke Hosomi; Atsutoshi Umezawa; Yoshiyuki Ikezawa
- Animator: Toei Animation
- Editor: Kenta Katase
- Production companies: Fuji Television; Toei Animation; Asmik Ace Entertainment; Dentsu; Sony Music Entertainment Japan; SKY Perfect Well Think; Yomiko Advertising

Original release
- Network: Fuji Television
- Release: January 10 – March 20, 2008

Hakaba Kitarō (墓場鬼太郎, Kitarō of the Graveyard) is a Japanese anime series adapted from the manga of the same name by Shigeru Mizuki, the manga which inspired the popular "Gegege no Kitarō" series in the late 60's. It was produced by Toei Animation and aired weekly between January 10, 2008, to March 20, 2008, on Fuji Television as part of Noitamina. According to Toei Animation, this adaptation is not considered part of "GeGeGe no Kitaro" franchise.

== Episodes ==
No.	Title	Directed by	Written by	Animation directed by	Art directed by	Original release date
1	"The Birth of Kitaro"; Transliteration: "Kitarō Tanjō" (Japanese: 鬼太郎誕生)	Directed by : Kōhei Hatano & Kimitoshi Chioka; Storyboarded by : Kimitoshi Chioka	Yoshimi Narita	Hidemi Kubo	Yumi Hosaka	January 10, 2008
2	"Yasha vs Dracula IV"; Transliteration: "Yasha tai Dorakyura Yonsei" (Japanese: 夜叉対ドラキュラ四世)	Hiroyuki Kakudō	Yoshimi Narita	Tateru Namikaze	Shōichirō Sugiura	January 17, 2008
3	"The Vampire Tree"; Transliteration: "Kyūketsu-ki" (Japanese: 吸血木)	Hidehito Ueda	Keiichi Hasegawa	Tatsuya Oka	Ryūtarō Masuda	January 24, 2008
4	"Neko"; Transliteration: "Neko" (Japanese: 寝子)	Tetsuji Nakamura	Ikuko Takahashi	Yūji Hakamada & Hidemi Kubo	Shōichirō Sugiura & Shinji Saitō	January 31, 2008
5	"The Fake Kitaro"; Transliteration: "Nise Kitarō" (Japanese: ニセ鬼太郎)	Directed by : Kōhei Hatano & Kimitoshi Chioka; Storyboarded by : Kimitoshi Chioka	Ikuko Takahashi	Takashi Hashimoto & Hidemi Kubo	Yoshiko Kitamura	February 7, 2008
6	"The Water God"; Transliteration: "Mizugami-sama" (Japanese: 水神様)	Iku Ishiguro	Yoshimi Narita	Masayuki Shimizu & Atsushi Soga	Takashi Kurahashi	February 14, 2008
7	"The Wolfman and the Ghost Train"; Transliteration: "Jinrō to Yūrei Resha" (Japanese: 人狼と幽霊列車)	Hiroki Shibata	Yoshimi Narita	Yoichi Onishi	Shōichirō Sugiura & Masanobu Ōtani	February 21, 2008
8	"The Bizarre Showdown"; Transliteration: "Kaiki Ichiban Shōbu" (Japanese: 怪奇一番勝負)	Unknown	Unknown	TBA	TBA	February 28, 2008
9	"Johnny in the Mist"; Transliteration: "Kiri no Naka Jonii" (Japanese: 霧の中のジョニー)	Unknown	Unknown	TBA	TBA	March 6, 2008
10	"Brigadoon"; Transliteration: "Burigadōn" (Japanese: ブリガドーン)	Unknown	Unknown	TBA	TBA	March 13, 2008
11	"A Foolish Man"; Transliteration: "Aho na Otoko" (Japanese: アホな男)	Unknown	Unknown	TBA	TBA	March 20, 2008

== Release ==
The series aired on Fuji TV from January 10 to March 20, 2008. It consists of 11 episodes, In Australia. Some episodes are available on DVD (which are they subtitled in English) and released by Siren Visual.
