= Fumiko Orikasa =

Japanese voice actress and singer (born 1974)

- 折笠 富美子
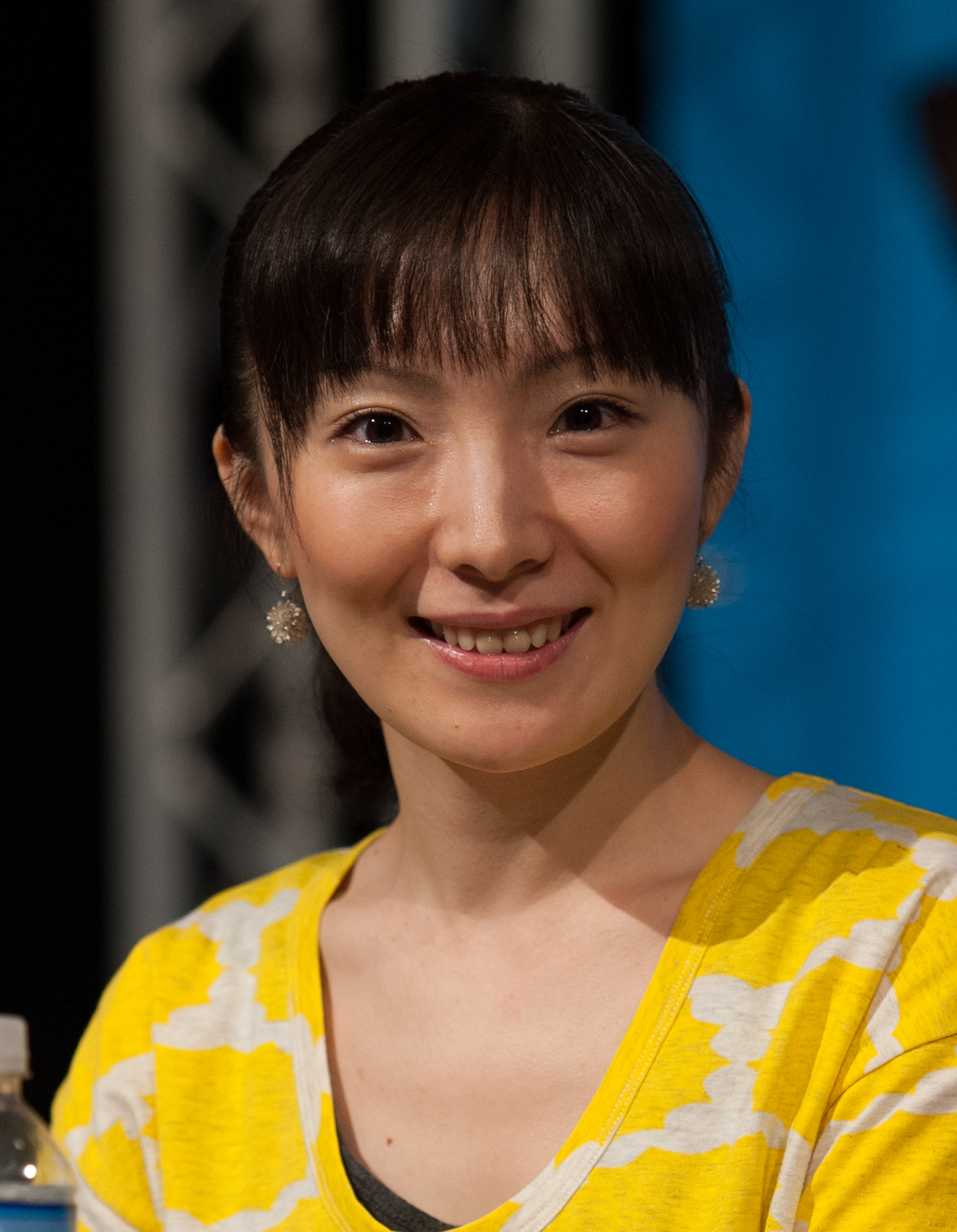
- Orikasa in 2012
- Born: December 27, 1974 (age 51); Edogawa, Tokyo, Japan
- Occupations: Actress; voice actress; singer
- Years active: 1999–present
- Agent: Atomic Monkey
- Notable work: Digimon Tamers as Ruki Makino (Rika Nonaka); Bleach as Rukia Kuchiki; Mobile Suit Gundam SEED Destiny as Meyrin Hawke; Suite PreCure as Kanade Minamino/Cure Rhythm; Kuroko's Basketball as Satsuki Momoi; Fullmetal Alchemist: Brotherhood as Riza Hawkeye; Street Fighter as Chun-Li; Little Witch Academia as Lotte Yanson; Den-noh Coil as Yūko "Yasako" Okonogi; Gintama as Yagyū Kyūbei
- Height: 157 cm (5 ft 2 in)

Fumiko Orikasa (折笠 富美子, Orikasa Fumiko; born December 27, 1974) is a Japanese actress, voice actress, and singer. She voiced Ruki Makino (Rika Nonaka) in Digimon Tamers, Rukia Kuchiki in Bleach, Meyrin Hawke in Mobile Suit Gundam Seed Destiny, Chun-Li in Street Fighter, Kanade Minamino/Cure Rhythm in Suite PreCure, Lotte Yanson in Little Witch Academia, and Riza Hawkeye in Fullmetal Alchemist: Brotherhood.

== Filmography ==
=== Anime series ===
Year	Title	Roles	Note
1998	Ojarumaru	Ajarimaru	
1999	Restol, The Special Rescue Squad	Mia	
1999	Great Teacher Onizuka	Azusa Fuyutsuki, Mikan, Kyoko Sasaki, Heroine (Ep. 27), Miyako Fujiyoshi (Ep. 29)	
1999	One Piece	Miss Valentine, Wanda	
2000	Boogiepop Phantom	Saki Yoshizawa	
2000–2002	Hajime no Ippo Rising	Yuki	
2000	Vandread	Meia Gisborn	
2001–2002	Digimon Tamers	Ruki Makino	
2001–2002	Figure 17 Tsubasa & Hikaru	Hikaru Shiina	
2001	I My Me! Strawberry Eggs	Seiko Kasuganomichi	
2001	Vandread: The Second Stage	Meia Gisborn	
2001–2002	Hellsing	Seras Victoria	
2002	Genma Taisen	Meena, Mimi	
2002	Chobits	Yuzuki	
2002–2003	Tokyo Mew Mew	Iruka	Ep. 19
2002–2009	Atashin'chi	Mikan Tachibana	
2002	Haibane Renmei	Hikari	
2002	Saishū Heiki Kanojo (Saikano)	Chise	
2002–2003	Petite Princess Yucie	Beth	
2002	RahXephon	Kim Hotal	
2003–2004	Ashita no Nadja	Sylvie Arte	
2003	Gad Guard	Arashi Shinozuka	
2003–2006	Zatch Bell!	Sherry Belmont	
2003	Scrapped Princess	Pacifica Casull, Celia (Ep. 22, 24)	
2003–2004	Battle Programmer Shirase	Yoriko Yunoki	
2003–2004	Kaleido Star	Marion Benigni	
2003	Shingetsutan Tsukihime	Ciel	
2003	Stellvia of the Universe	Yayoi Fujisawa	
2003	Stratos 4	Karin Kikuhara	
2004–2007	Kaiketsu Zorori	Princess Elzie	
2004	Fullmetal Alchemist	Lydia	
2004	Kyou Kara Maou!	Elizabeth	Ep.45
2004–2005	Agatha Christie's Great Detectives Poirot and Marple	Mabel West	
2004–2012	Bleach	Rukia Kuchiki, Hisana Kuchiki, Chappy, Ashisogi Jizo	
2004–2005	Mobile Suit Gundam SEED Destiny	Meyrin Hawke	
2004–2006	Kinnikuman II-Sei	Rinko Nikaidō	
2004	Samurai 7	Kirara	
2005	Jinki:EXTEND	Aoba Tsuzaki	
2005	Futari wa Pretty Cure	Katsuko Nagasawa	Season 2
2005	Onegai My Melody	Risu-kun, Konmi	
2005	Pani Poni	Himeko Katagiri	
2005	Ichigo Mashimaro	Matsuoka Miu	
2005–2006	Hell Girl	Inori Ujiie	
2005–2007	Saint Seiya Omega	Saori Kido	The Hades Chapter - Inferno (OAV)
2006–2021	Gin Tama	Kyūbei Yagyū, Kyuubei Pinko (Ep. 229)	Season 4, TV2 2011, TV3 3/2012, TV 4/2015, TV7 2018
2006	Higurashi When They Cry	Rumiko Chie	
2006	Tokko	Sakura Rokujo	
2006	Code Geass: Lelouch of the Rebellion	Shirley Fenette, Ayame Futaba	
2006	Fushigiboshi no Futagohime Gyu!	Sasha	
2006	Ayakashi Ayashi	Atoru	
2006	Kinnikuman II-Sei	Rinko Nikaidō	
2006	Nishi no Yoki Majo Astraea Testament	Firiel Dee	
2006–2007	Shōnen Onmyōji	Kazane	
2007	Skull Man	Maya Kuroshio	
2007	Dennō Coil	Yūko Okonogi	
2007	Devil May Cry: The Animated Series	Lady	
2007–2008	Jushin Enbu	Taki	
2007–2008	Saint Seiya Omega	Saori Kido	
2008–2009	The Tower of Druaga	Kaaya	
2008	Shigofumi	Haruno Kasai	
2008	Vampire Knight	Shizuka Hiou	
2008	Telepathy Shōjo Ran	Momoko Ōhara	
2008	Hyakko	Torako Kageyama	
2008–2009	Xam'd: Lost Memories	Haru Nishimura	
2009	Kawa no Hikari	Tata	Special
2009–2010	Kobato	Sayaka Okiura	
2009	Birdy the Mighty: Decode 02	Marina	Ep. 3
2009–2010	Fullmetal Alchemist: Brotherhood	Riza Hawkeye, Brosh's Little Sister (Ep. 49)	TV & OVA
2009–2010	Stitch! Itazura Alien no Daibōken	Sae	
2009	Tamagotchi!	Pianitchi	
2009	Ristorante Paradiso	Nicoletta	
2010–2011	HeartCatch PreCure!	Azusa Takagishi	
2010	Sgt. Frog	Kanae Tokiwa	Ep. 304
2010	Nurarihyon no Mago	Yukari	
2010–2011	Starry Sky	Tsukiko Yahisa	
2011	Marvel Anime: Wolverine	Mariko Yashida	
2011	Dog Days"	Leaf Lang de Shar Harva	
2011	Toriko	Koryou	Ep. 69
2011–2012	Suite PreCure	Kanade Minamino / Cure Rhythm	
2011–2012	Sket Dance	Yuuki Reiko	Ep. 5-6, 10, 15, 21, 32-33, 39, 45, 54, 56, 63-64, 71, 77
2011–2012	Digimon Xros Wars: The Boy Hunters Who Leapt Through Time	Ruki Makino	Season 3
2011–2012	Last Exile: Fam, the Silver Wing	Vasant	
2011	Natsume's Book of Friends	Murasaki	Season 3, Ep. 3
2011	Nurarihyon no Mago: Sennen Makyou	Yukari	
2012–2015	Kuroko's Basketball series as Satsuki Momoi	Satsuki Momoi	
2012–2013	Kuromajo-san ga Toru!!	Chiyoko "Choco" Kurotori	
2013	Inazuma Eleven GO: Galaxy	Powai Pichori	
2013	Kuromajo-san ga Toru!!	Chiyoko "Choco" Kurotori	
2013	Pokémon: XY	Diantha	
2014	Tokyo Ghoul	Ryoko Fueguchi	
2014	Mysterious Joker	Princess Paprika	Ep. 18
2015–2016	Ushio and Tora	Hizaki Mikado	
2016	Luck & Logic	Artemism	
2017	Little Witch Academia	Lotte Yanson	
2017	18if	Sono, Pot (Ep. 7)	
2017	Elegant Yokai Apartment Life	Haruka Aoki	
2017	Altair: A Record of Battles	Cecelia Brega	Ep. 8
2018	Junji Ito Collection	Risa	Ep. 8
2019	Meiji Tokyo Renka	Jane	Ep. 3
2019	Cop Craft	Cecil Epps	
2019	Beastars	Haru's Mother	
2019–current	Ascendance of a Bookworm	Effa	
2020	Appare-Ranman!	Sophia Taylor	
2020–2021	Higurashi: When They Cry – GOU	Rumiko Chie	
2021	Mars Red	Aoi Shirase	
2021	Higurashi: When They Cry – SOTSU	Rumiko Chie	
2022	Bleach: Thousand-Year Blood War	Rukia Kuchiki	
2022	Pokémon Ultimate Journeys: The Series	Diantha	
2023	Trigun Stampede	Ruida	
2024	My Hero Academia Season 7	Yuga Aoyama's Mother	
2024	Beastars Final Season	Seven	

=== OVA/ONA ===
Year	Title	Roles	Note
2002–2003	Saint Seiya: Hades – Chapter Sanctuary	Saori Kido/Athena	(OVA)
2004	Bleach: Memories in the Rain	Rukia Kuchiki	(OVA)
2004	Hourglass of Summer	Ligene/Lee Jane	(OVA)
2004	Stratos 4: Return to Base	Karin Kikuhara	(OVA)
2005	Mobile Suit Gundam SEED Destiny The Chosen Future	Meyrin Hawke	(OVA)
2005	Bleach: The Sealed Sword Frenzy	Rukia Kuchiki	(OVA)
2005	SaiKano: Another Love Song	Chise	(OVA)
2005–2007	Saint Seiya: Hades – Chapter Inferno	Saori Kido/Athena	Part 1 & 2(OVA)
2005–2006	Stratos 4: Advance	Karin Kikuhara	(OVA)
2006	Stratos 4: Advance Kanketsu Hen	Karin Kikuhara	(OVA)
2006–2012	Hellsing Ultimate	Seras Victoria	(OVA)
2008	Saint Seiya: Hades – Chapter Elysion	Saori Kido/Athena	(OVA)
2006	Mobile Suit Gundam SEED Destiny Special Edition	Meyrin Hawke	(OVA)
2007–2008	Higurashi no Naku Koro ni Kai: Ura☆Higu	Rumiko Chie	Ep. 19 (OVA)
2007	Strawberry Marshmallow	Miu Matsuoka	(OVA)
2009	Street Fighter IV: The Ties That Bind	Chun-Li	(OVA)
2009	Haykko Extra	Torako Kageyama	(OVA)
2011	Higurashi no Naku Koro ni Kira	Rumiko Chie	(OVA)
2013	Kamisama Kiss: Past Arc	Yukiji	(OVA)
2015	Little Witch Academia: The Enchanted Parade	Lotte Yanson	(OVA)
2019	Knights of the Zodiac: Saint Seiya	Saori Kido/Athena	(ONA)
2023	My Daemon	Kaoru Tachibana	(ONA)
2025	Devil May Cry	Lady	(ONA)

=== Film/Movie ===
Year	Title	Roles	Note
2001	Millennium Actress	young Chiyoko Fujiwara	
2001	Digimon Tamers: Battle of Adventurers	Ruki Makino	
2002	Digimon Tamers: Runaway Locomon	Ruki Makino	
2002	Pokémon Heroes	Bianca	
2004	Inuyasha the Movie: Fire on the Mystic Island	Asagi	
2006	Bleach: Memories of Nobody	Rukia Kuchiki	
2006	Dōbutsu no Mori	Sally the Elephant	
2007	Bleach: The Diamond Dust Rebellion	Rukia Kuchiki	
2007	Naruto: Shippūden the Movie	Miroku	
2008	Bleach: Fade to Black	Rukia Kuchiki, Hisana Kuchiki	
2009	Professor Layton and the Eternal Diva	Melina Whistler	
2010	Gintama: The Movie	Kyūbei Yagyū	
2010	Bleach: Hell Verse	Rukia Kuchiki	
2011	Children Who Chase Lost Voices from Deep Below	Asuna's Mother	
2011	Fullmetal Alchemist: The Sacred Star of Milos	Riza Hawkeye	
2011	Magic Tree House	Peanuts	
2011	Pretty Cure All Stars DX3: Deliver the Future! The Rainbow~Colored Flower That Connects the World!	Kanade Minamino / Cure Rhythm	
2012	Pretty Cure All Stars New Stage: Friend of the Future	Kanade Minamino / Cure Rhythm	
2013	Gintama: The Movie: The Final Chapter: Be Forever Yorozuya	Kyūbei Yagyū	
2017	Laughing Under the Clouds Gaiden	Koyuki Kumō	
2017	Kuroko's Basketball The Movie: Last Game	Satsuki Momoi	
2018	Doraemon the Movie: Nobita's Treasure Island	Sara	
2018	Waka Okami wa Shōgakusei!		
2018	Hugtto! PreCure Futari wa Pretty Cure: All Stars Memories	Kanade Minamino / Cure Rhythm	
2021	Gintama: The Very Final	Kyūbei Yagyū	
2024	Mobile Suit Gundam SEED Freedom	Meyrin Hawke	

=== Video games ===
Year	Title	Roles	Console	Source
2001	Inuyasha	Nazuna	PlayStation	
2002	Hourglass of Summer	Ligene/Lee Jane	PlayStation 2, Microsoft Windows	
2003	Cyber Troopers Virtual-On Marz	Jennifer Poison	PlayStation 2, PlayStation Network	
2004	Symphonic Rain	Liselsia Cesarini	Microsoft Windows	
2005	Critical Velocity	Hope	PlayStation 2	
2006	Dirge of Cerberus: Final Fantasy VII	Shelke the Transparent	PlayStation 2	
2006	Suikoden V	Miakis and Chisato	PlayStation 2	
2005–present	Bleach	Rukia Kuchiki	PlayStation 2, PlayStation 3, Xbox 360, iOS, Android, PlayStation 4, PlayStation 5, Xbox One, Xbox Series X/S	
2007	Luminous Arc	Cecille	Nintendo DS	
2007	Eternal Sonata	Princess Serenade	Xbox 360, PlayStation 3	
2008	Street Fighter IV series	Chun-Li	Arcade, PlayStation 3, Xbox 360, Microsoft Windows, iOS, Android, PlayStation 4, Xbox One	
2008	Tatsunoko vs. Capcom	Chun-Li	Arcade, Wii	
2010	Zangeki no Reginleiv	Idunn	Wii	
2011	Marvel vs. Capcom 3: Fate of Two Worlds	Chun-Li	PlayStation 3, Xbox 360	
2011	Ultimate Marvel vs. Capcom 3	Chun-Li	PlayStation 3, Xbox 360, PlayStation Vita, PlayStation 4, Microsoft Windows, Xbox One	
2012	Street Fighter X Tekken	Chun-Li	Shield Android TV, Shield Portable, Shield Tablet, PlayStation 3, PlayStation Vita, Xbox 360, Microsoft Windows, iOS	
2012	Project X Zone	Chun-Li, Lady	Nintendo 3DS	
2015	Devil May Cry 4: Special Edition	Lady	PlayStation 3, Xbox 360, Microsoft Windows, Android, iOS, PlayStation 4, Xbox One, Shield Android TV	
2015	Return to PopoloCrois	Sedona	Nintendo 3DS	
2015	Project X Zone 2	Chun-Li, Miyuki-chan	Nintendo 3DS	
2016	Street Fighter V	Chun-Li	PlayStation 4, Microsoft Windows, Arcade	
2016	World of Final Fantasy	Shelke the Transparent	PlayStation 4, PlayStation Vita, Microsoft Windows, Nintendo Switch, Xbox One	
2017	Another Eden	Shannon	Android, iOS, Nintendo Switch	
2019	Jump Force	Rukia Kuchiki	Microsoft Windows, PlayStation 4, Xbox One	
2019	Devil May Cry 5	Lady	Microsoft Windows, PlayStation 4, Xbox One	
2019	Teppen	Chun-Li	Android, iOS	
2021	Fist of the North Star Legends ReVIVE	Chun-Li	Android, iOS	
2021	Cookie Run: Kingdom	Black Raisin Cookie	Android, iOS	
2022	Arknights	Fiammetta	Android, iOS	
2022	The King of Fighters All Star	Chun-Li	Android, iOS	
2022	Alchemy Stars	Pollux	Android, iOS	
2023	Street Fighter 6	Chun-Li	Microsoft Windows, PlayStation 4, PlayStation 5, Xbox Series X, Xbox Series S	
2025	Genshin Impact	Ronova	Android, iOS, Microsoft Windows, PlayStation 4, PlayStation 5, Xbox Series X, Xbox Series S	
2025	Fatal Fury: City of the Wolves	Chun-Li	Microsoft Windows, PlayStation 4, PlayStation 5, Xbox Series X, Xbox Series S	
2025	Inazuma Eleven: Victory Road	Musubi Fukura	Microsoft Windows, PlayStation 4, PlayStation 5, Xbox Series X, Xbox Series S	

=== Tokusatsu ===
Year	Title	Roles	Note
2000	Mirai Sentai Timeranger	Time Robota	

== Dubbing ==
Year	Title	Roles	Note
1997	Home Alone 3 as Molly Pruitt	Voiceover dubbed of Scarlett Johansson – Molly Pruitt	
1998	All I Wanna Do	Voiceover dubbed of Rachael Leigh Cook – Abigail "Abby" Sawyer	Origin Title: Strike!, The Harry Bird
1998	Nicholas' Gift as Eleanor	Voiceover dubbed of Hallie Kate Eisenberg – Eleanor	
1998	She's All That as Laney Boggs	Voiceover dubbed of Rachael Leigh Cook – Laney Boggs	
2001	Zenon: The Zequel as Zenon Kar	Voiceover dubbed of Kirsten Storms – Zenon Kar	
2002	It's a Very Merry Muppet Christmas Movie	Voiceover dubbed of Judy Reyes – Nurse Carla Espinosa	
2003	CSI: Crime Scene Investigation	Voiceover dubbed of Evan Rachel Wood – Nora Easton	
2005	Venom	Voiceover dubbed of Laura Ramsey – Rachel	
2005	Barbie and the Magic of Pegasus	Princess Brietta	
2006–2011	High School Musical	Voiceover dubbed of Vanessa Hudgens – Gabriella Montez	TV movie series
2011	Happiness Is a Warm Blanket, Charlie Brown	Sally Brown	
2011	I Need Romance	Voiceover dubbed of Jo Yeo-jeong – Sunwoo In-young	
2014	Jungle Shuffle	Sacha	
2016–2018	Beat Bugs	Voiceover dubbed of Erin Mathews – Kumi	
2019	Parasite	Voiceover dubbed of Cho Yeo-jeong – Choi Yeon-gyo	
2026	Street Fighter	Voiceover dubbed of Callina Liang – Chun-Li	

== Discography ==
=== Singles ===
#	Information
1st	Rinne no Hate Ni... (輪廻の果てに…): Release date: November 6, 2003; Oricon weekly peak: #67; Weeks on charts: 3
2nd	Sweetie: Release date: May 24, 2006 (First song used for the Anime series, Animal Yokocho; Oricon weekly peak: #109; Weeks on charts: 1

=== Album ===
#	Information
1st	Lune: Release date: January 21, 2004
2nd	Flower: Release date: September 14, 2005; Oricon weekly peak: #64; Weeks on charts: 2
3rd	Uraraka easy (うららか easy): Release date: December 21, 2007; Oricon weekly peak: #248; Weeks on charts: 1
4th	Serendipity: Release date: March 25, 2009; Oricon weekly peak: #211; Weeks on charts: 1
