= Yukiko Tamaki =

Japanese voice actress

Yūki Tamaki 環有希
- Born: Yukiko Tamaki 玉木有紀子; February 10, 1980 (age 46); Chiba, Japan
- Occupation: Voice actress
- Agent: ToriTori Office

Yūki Tamaki (環有希, Tamaki Yūki; born February 10, 1980), also known by the stage name Yukiko Tamaki (玉木有紀子, Tamaki Yukiko), is a Japanese voice actress who was born in Chiba, Japan. She is part of ToriTori office.

== Filmography ==
=== Anime television ===
- Beet the Vandel Buster as Zeke
- Coyote Ragtime Show as May
- Digimon Tamers as Hirokazu Shiota
- Hunter × Hunter (1999) as Pokkle
- Konjiki no Gash Bell!! as Nicholas
- Onegai My Melody as Cat News
- Super GALS! Kotobuki Ran as Clerk (ep 26); Instructor (eps 7-8); Tan Face Red
- Transformers: Cybertron as Coby
- Transformers: Car Robots as Build Boy
- Demashita! Powerpuff Girls Z as Butch
- Ojamajo Doremi as Kenta Iizuka
