= Yu Yuen-wong =

Hong Kong manhua artist

- Traditional Chinese: 余遠鍠
- Simplified Chinese: 余远锽
- Jyutping: jyu4 jyun5 wong4
Transcriptions
Standard Mandarin
- Hanyu Pinyin: Yú Yuǎnhuáng
Yue: Cantonese
- Jyutping: jyu4 jyun5 wong4

Yu Yuen-wong (Chinese: 余遠鍠, born circa 1979) is a Hong Kong manhua artist.

According to Yu, he read Japanese manga in his youth. He created the manhua Digimon: Digital Monsters after Bandai contracted his work in 1999. He experienced prosperity to the point where he purchased a flat, but by the 2000s he received less work and sold the flat as a result of financial difficulties. As of 2019 he creates illustrations for books, including The Great Detective Sherlock Holmes.

== See also ==
- Hong Kong comics
