= Digimon Fusion season 3 =

Digimon Fusion
- Season 3
- No. of episodes: 25

Release
- Original network: TV Asahi
- Original release: October 4, 2011 – March 21, 2012

Season chronology
- ← Previous; Digimon Fusion (season 2) Next → App Monsters

The following is a list of episodes for the third arc of Toei Animation's Digimon Fusion series, known in Japan as Digimon Xros Wars: The Boy Hunters Who Leapt Through Time (デジモンクロスウォーズ 〜時を駆ける少年ハンターたち〜, Dejimon Kurosu Wōzu: Toki o Kakeru Shōnen Hantā-tachi). The story follows Taiki Kudō and his united friends attempting to protect both worlds from Quartzmon. The opening theme is "Stand Up" by Twill. The series also features original music by Kousuke Yamashita, as well as various insert songs sung by Kōji Wada and Psychic Lover. This season did not receive a localized English dub.

== Episode list ==
No. overall	No. in season	Title	Directed by	Written by	Original release date
55	1	("We, the Digimon Hunters!"); Transliteration: "Oretachi, Dejimon Hantā!" (Japanese: おれたち、デジモンハンター!)	Unknown	Riku Sanjo	October 4, 2011
It is a year since Taiki Kudō's (Mikey Kudo in english) adventure in the Digital World as he forms the "Xros Heart" (Fusion Fighters) basketball team together with Yū Amano (Ewan Amano), who became his junior at his school, and Tagiru Akashi, the new main character. However, on his way home from the game, Taiki sees a monstrous shadow within a space fluctuation before being confronted by three children. The leader of the trio recognizes Taiki and his potential but tells him not to meddle in their affairs before leaving. The next day after school, Tagiru hears a voice begging to be saved, and after seeing a spatial distortion, Tagiru gets dragged right into it and ends up in a Digital World like dimension called the DigiQuartz, where time flows differently from the real world. Tagiru sees the source of the voice, Gumdramon being attacked by a MetalTyranomon until the three children arrive and fight it with their Digimon, but it escapes from them. After being told they are Digimon Hunters, Tagiru wants to be one too as he is told to get a X Loader first. Teaming up with Gumdramon, Tagiru finds the Old Clock Store Owner and heads to his home and receives a crimson X Loader (Fusion Loader) from him. Taiki and Yū find out about the rampaging Digimon and when they see Tagiru warping into the DigiQuartz, they decide to follow him. Tagiru and Gumdramon fight a losing battle with MetalTyranomon until Tagiru learns to Super Evolve (Digivolve) Gumdramon into Arresterdramon and defeat it. After capturing MetalTyranomon's data into his Xros Loader, Tagiru sees Taiki and Yū, who are branding their own X Loaders, much to his surprise, but before they start to talk about the situation, Shoutmon contacts Taiki through his Loader. Gumdramon shivers and hides behind Tagiru at hearing Shoutmon's name as he explains to Tagiru that it is none other than the Digimon King himself.
56	2	("The Students Disappear! The Wavering Shadow of Sagomon"); Transliteration: "Seito-tachi ga Kieta! Yurameku Sagomon no Kage" (Japanese: 生徒たちが消えた！ゆらめくサゴモンの影)	Unknown	Riku Sanjo	October 11, 2011
After returning to the Real World, finding out that Digimon can be Reloaded outside of DigiQuartz, Tagiru learns of Taiki and Yū's past experience with the Digimon a year before. Inspired to be at Taiki's level, Tagiru returns to DigiQuartz to begin a new Hunt. The two encounter a mysterious shadow behind the abductions of students: Sagomon. Sagomon overwhelms Gumdramon before he and Tagiru are saved by one of the three children, Ryōma Mogami. As this occurred, going to the alley were Tagiru got his Xros Loader, Taiki meets the Old Clock Store Owner and his Digimon Clockmon. The Owner proceeds to warn Taiki not to interfere with the Hunts due to expertise having an effect that would upset the balance of the "game". Though not intending to take part, Taiki promises to interfere if any one gets hurt in the cross fire. Noting that Taiki has a strong will like Tagiru, the Old Clockmaker leaves, but not before giving Taiki the Hunter's Rulebook, which Tagiru forgot to get. With Yū following him to make sure he does not abuse Digimon like before, Tagiru finds Sagomon in the pool area, where the students are being held. Even after having Gumdramon Super Evolve and DigiXros with MetalTyrannomon to become Metal Arresterdramon, Tagiru still struggles until Taiki shows up with Shoutmon, who pushes back Sagomon with one punch before becoming OmegaShoutmon and DigiXrosing with Dorulumon to aid Arresterdramon. After defeating Sagomon and collecting his data, Tagiru, Taiki, and Yū return to the Real World with the missing students, who have no recollection of their time in "DigiQuartz". Soon after being yelled at by Shoutmon while also being praised him for finding a partner, Gumdramon vows to catch up to his rival before he and Tagiru run back to DigiQuartz and start a new Hunt.
57	3	("The Robot Club's Dream, Pinocchimon's Enticement"); Transliteration: "Robotto Bu no Yume, Pinokimon no Yūwaku" (Japanese: ロボット部の夢、ピノッキモンの誘惑)	Unknown	Shōji Yonemura	October 18, 2011
Tokio Hinoki and the members of the school's robotics club are frustrated because they keep failing to build a robot good enough to take part in the upcoming competition when they approached by Xros Heart's old friend, Puppetmon, who offers them a chance to take part in a greater project. The next day, while told to deliver a notice to the absent Tokio, Tagiru learns from Taiki that all other members of the robotics club are also absent from school, and fearing it to be Digimon related, he and Yū accompany him to Tokio's house, just to find him working on some machinery. Figuring that Tokio is deceiving his mother in thinking he is going to school to stay home, Xros Heart witnesses Tokio entering into the DigiQuartz through his computer. By following him there, they learn that Tokio and the other missing children have been building a GigaBreakdramon under Puppetmon's orders. Taiki and Shoutmon confront Puppetmon who seems to not remember them at all and launches GigaBreakdramon against them. Tagiru and the Digimon Hunters battle GigaBreakdramon without success. When Ryōma commands Astamon to attack Puppetmon instead, Taiki and Shoutmon risk getting hurt to protect Puppetmon enables him to come to his senses. By DigiXrosing Shoutmon with Puppetmon, Taiki manages to give Arresterdramon an opening to defeat GigaBreakdramon who is captured by Tagiru.
58	4	("The Targeted Honor Students! Blossomon's Smile"); Transliteration: "Yūtōsei ga Nerawareta! Burossamon no Bishō" (Japanese: 優等生が狙われた！ブロッサモンの微笑)	Unknown	Isao Murayama	October 25, 2011
Tagiru's classmate Miho Sudo has been 1st place Honor Student since Elementary, stresses out on improving her grades when she is at 8th place. Miho's desire for the top 7 students to disappear attracts the attention of a Digimon who offers to make it a reality for her. Later, feeling jealous of Tagiru and Gumdramon, Yū meets Miho. Soon after, news of the two top students in their grade, Mishima and Takahashi, being attacked and looking malnourished drives everyone in school in an uproar. Only Miho had no reaction to the event as Yū follows her while Tagiru enters the Digi Quartz and finds the school covered by a vine looking plant whose tendrils are wrapped around Mishima and Takahashi while draining them. Losing the vines' source, a flustered Tagiru and Gumdramon are encountered by Ren as he tells them that can not defeat vine Digimon unless they find its true form. Deciding to help for his own benefit, Ren has Dracmon bite into the vine to expose the Digimon. This not only causes the vine to go on rampage out of pain, but if affects Miho on a sympathetic level as she enters the DigiQuartz and merges with the Digimon: revealed to be Blossomon. Yū's good heart frees Miho from Blossomon's control, who was captured by Tagiru. In the end, Yū win a basketball match, while Tagiru has his nose broken.
59	5	("Cuteness Causion! Cute Hunter, Airu's Trap!"); Transliteration: "Kawaii Yōchūi! Kyūto Hantā, Airu no Wana!" (Japanese: かわいさ要注意！キュートハンター、アイルの罠！)	Unknown	Riku Sanjo	November 1, 2011
At a cute store called the Fancy Shop Dream, Airu Suzaki, along with her Digimon Opossumon, capture a bunch of other Digimon. Finding that all of them are "no good", Airu leaves the Digimon to her teammates. Still feeling down about not being able to reunite with Damemon, Cutemon appears in front of Yū to cheer him up but ends up being targeted by Airu, who wants to add him to her cute Digimon collection. While Yū returns home, with Tagiru and Gumdramon tagging along, Cutemon spots a bunch of pictures of Nene, who has since become an idol in Hong Kong. After falling asleep from their meal, Cutemon, Tagiru, and Gumdramon awake to find Yū gone. Finding Yū at the park where he and Damemon first met, Tagiru, Gumdramon, and Cutemon make just in time as Airu transports Yū to the DigiQuartz. Trying to force Yū to hand over Cutemon, Airu nearly succeeds, until her DigiXros of Opossumon and Candlemon allows them to escape. The next day, after explaining what's happened to Taiki, Yū realizes that Cutemon has snuck out of his Xros Loader when he tries to return him to Taiki. They all run back to the park, where Airu has captured Cutemon and plans on forcing him into her Xros Loader. She is soon joined by her teammates, who formally introduces themselves as Ryōma Mogami and Ren Tobari, before Ryōma Super Evolves Psychemon to Astamon to keep them from saving Cutemon. Both Taiki and Tagiru then Reload their Digimon and digivolve them to OmegaShoutmon and Arresterdramon respectively. While Taiki decides to face Ryōma and Ren alone, Tagiru and Arresterdramon go help Yū save Cutemon. By then, Airu Super Evolves Opossumon to Cho-Hakkaimon to force Cutemon into her Xros Loader. Airu is about to defeat Cutemon when Yū saves him and Damemon appears. Now with the power of digivolution, Damemon digivolves to Tsuwamon and easily overpowers Cho-Hakkaimon, trapping her and Airu in their own trap. After releasing Airu and Opossumon, Taiki, Tagiru, and Yū meet back at the rooftop with their Digimon, happy that Damemon has finally returned and Yū is finally reunited with his partner.
60	6	("Digimon Kendo Match! Approaching the Blade of Kotemon!"); Transliteration: "Dejimon Kendō Shōbu! Kotemon no Yaiba ga Semaru!" (Japanese: デジモン剣道勝負！コテモンの刃が迫る！)	Unknown	Shōji Yonemura	November 8, 2011
The Xros Heart boys join the school's kendo club for the regional tournament and after winning a match, they find that they are being observed by Musashi Kenzaki, a student from a rival school. Later, Musashi ends up in the DigiQuartz and meets Kotemon who takes him as his pupil. Some time later, a mysterious figure starts challenging members from adult kendo clubs throughout the city and beats them to the point of shredding up their clothes. Tagiru and the others figure out that this incident could be Digimon related and investigate by themselves until they find that the mysterious attacker is actually Musashi. Tagiru challenges Musashi for a match and he sees a second blade appearing on his other hand for an instant to block his attack. Musashi flees and Kotemon appears, offering himself to train Tagiru asking him to help bring Musashi to stop following the dark path he is taking. In the tournament, Tagiru challenges Musashi, again, but during their match, they get sucked into the DigiQuartz. Ren appears and Tagiru learns that the reason for Musashi's sudden change is because Dracmon is using him to create dark energy, which it uses to Digivolve into Yasyamon. Arresterdramon finds difficulty in fighting Yasyamon, but by Kotemon's request, Tagiru has Gumdramon DigiXros with him and together they defeat Yasyamon, forcing Ren to flee. Back in the human world, Musashi and Tagiru resume their battle, and Musashi wins fair and square, but Tagiru is not sad as both have given their best.
61	7	("The Okonomiyaki Panic! The Town Full of Pagumon"); Transliteration: "Okonomiyaki Panikku! Pagumon Darake no Machi" (Japanese: お好み焼きパニック！パグモンだらけの街)	Unknown	Reiko Yoshida	November 15, 2011
Tagiru, Yū and Taiki go to an okonomiyaki store after school. But the moment the three of them open the door, they go into the world where Digimon live in DigiQuartz, and encounter a Digimon named Pagumon, who loves Okinomiyaki. Tagiru wants to hunt Pagumon. The next day, Tagiru and the others heard about whoever ate the potato chips have either disappeared or flowing in the air. Then Pagumon says "It must be Jagamon's doing!" Tagiru wants to hunt Jagamon so he goes towards the closest convenient store. He stunks looking at the boys and girls who are holding the Potato Chips and flowing in the air, Tagiru goes into DigiQuartz, and plans to hunt Jagamon. However as Tagiru reloads Gumdramon, Pagumon starts to battle themselves. Jagamon notices Pagumon, he sends Gumdramon flying and runs away. They thought that they could find Jagamon, but due to Pagumon's "bad advices", they continue to lose the hunt. Because it's all Pagumon's fault, Gundramon is very angry, and demands Tagiru to reload him from the Xros Loader to capture Pagumon. However Tagiru defends Pagumon, and starts to argue with Gumdramon. Gumdramon is mad and goes into Ryoma's X-Loader. Tagiru and Gumdramon are separated from each other. Tagiru goes back home and starts worrying about Gumdramon. Paguman says he still misses Gumdramon but he doesn't admit it. He makes some okonomiyaki but Pagumon confesses that he has never eaten it before, he has just liked the smell. Pagumon decided to eat the okonomiyaki and starts to become strange. Pagumon starts multiplying and goes to every okonomiyaki store in the city. Taiki, Yū and Tagiru meet up at one of the stores. Tagiru tries to capture them with MetalTyrannomon but fails. At that moment, Ryoma comes along and reloads Gumdramon, saying that he doesn't want Gumdramon. Gumdramon thinks of a plan after Tagiru tells them what happened. He asks the chef to make the biggest okonomiyaki that he can. Gumdramon carries the okonomiyaki to the pool with all of the Pagumon chasing him. He puts the okonomiyaki inside the pool and the Pagumon start going in a circle. They eventually turn into okonomiyaki dough. Gumdramon says what if they were already okonomiyaki. Tagiru captures the Pagumon and the original Pagumon is confused and appears to have lost its memory. Gumdramon and Tagiru become friends again.
62	8	("Business is Booming For The Digimon Hunt! The Shopping District's Master Hunter!"); Transliteration: "Degimon Hanto Daihanjō! Shōtengai no Sugoude Hantā!" (Japanese: デジモンハント大繁盛！商店街の凄腕ハンター！)	Unknown	Isao Murayama	November 22, 2011
Soon learning that a new hunter named Hideaki with his partner Dobermon, uses Digimon hunting to earn profit, Tagiru and Gumdramon hunt Zenimon around the Shinonome Higashi Shopping District. Although while in Digi-Quartz, they stumble upon a Ganemon, who is searching for the Zenimon he said to be "lost". Tagiru and Hideaki agree to help them capture all the Zenimon. When both Hunters decide to take a break in the human world, Ganemon releases all the captured Zenimon to get small change for him. Which then leads to Ganemon growing bigger and stronger, betraying the hunters. They come back and work together, defeating Ganemon, and Hideaki doesn't hunt Digimon for a profit realizing he has to do it a more appropriate way.
63	9	("Taiki Is Targeted! The Super Celebrity Star's Brave Shout!"); Transliteration: "Nerawareta Taiki! Chō Serebu Sutā no Otakebi!" (Japanese: 狙われたタイキ！超セレブ・スターの雄たけび！)	Unknown	Riku Sanjo	November 29, 2011
Akari (Angie) returns to town to visit Taiki, oblivious to the Digimon Hunts. SuperStarmon decides to capture Taiki and add him to his collection of imprisoned celebrity dolls. He lures Taiki and Akari to a deluxe hotel where he traps them in the DigiQuartz. Tagiru, Yū and Ryouma join forces to save Taiki and Akari, and capture SuperStarmon. Yū and Tsuwamon successfully save Taiki and Akari, the latter suggesting Taiki and Yū DoubleXros Shoutmon, Ballistamon, Dorulumon and Starmon and the Pickmons into Shoutmon X4. Shoutmon X4 defeats SuperStarmon and he is captured by Yū. Akari offers her assistance to Taiki when she is available, and Zenjiro (Jeremy) bursts into Taiki's room demanding to know where the Clockmaker is. After the fight, Ryouma tells the Clock Owner about what just happened in DigiQuartz.
64	10	("Going to Hong Kong! Protect the Super Beauty Idol!!"); Transliteration: "Honkon Jōriku! Chōbishōjo Aidoru o Mamore!!" (Japanese: 香港上陸！超美少女アイドルを守れ！！)	Unknown	Shōji Yonemura	December 6, 2011
Tagiru, Taiki and Yū are taken by a Trailmon to an unknown location in DigiQuartz at the request of "a certain person" who needs to meet them. The trio Timeshifts back to the Human World and find themselves in Hong Kong. Yū guides the others around the city until they are picked up by a limo owned by the boy's older sister and fellow Xros Heart member Nene, now a well known idol. Revealing herself to be the one who sent the Trailmon to them, Nene explains that she is being stalked by a mysterious masked man with strange powers and suspects that a Digimon is behind this incident. Tagiru is the most enthusiastic to help Nene, but ends up causing more trouble by attacking and injuring a stage actor after mistaking him for the masked stalker and is forced to fill in. Just then Nene is about to shake Tagiru's hand after a job well done, when the masked man appears and attacks him. Nene's suspicions are confirmed when they find a Harpymon beside him, but the enemy proves itself too agile for them and flees. Taiki concludes that only JetMervamon's speed may cope with Harpymon's and after the masked man appears again, he and the others join forces to stall him until Nene takes a break from her concert to join the fight. However, JetMervamon is defeated by Harpymon and an enraged Tagiru asks Nene to let him borrow Sparrowmon. By DigiXrosing Arresterdramon with Sparrowmon, Tagiru defeats and captures Harpymon. The masked man is then revealed to be Nene's father, who fell under Harpymon's influence due to his anxiety of his daughter's decision to become an idol overseas. With the incident resolved, Tagiru and the others return to the Human World to watch the rest of Nene's concert.
65	11	("Tagiru Turns Soft?! Gumdramon's Big Crisis!!"); Transliteration: "Tagiru ga Funyafunya!? Gamudoramon Dai Pinchi!!" (Japanese: タギルがふにゃふにゃ!? ガムドラモン大ピンチ!!)	Unknown	Isao Murayama	December 13, 2011
Usually active and passionate students and teachers in Tagiru's school have become lifeless and short of energy. Tagiru suspects that a Digimon is behind this and investigates the DigiQuartz with Gumdramon. Upon investigation, he finds that FlaWizardmon is the one responsible. FlameWizardmon has been absorbing life energy from people to power himself up. Tagiru's passionate energy ends up being absorbed by FlaWizardmon and he himself becomes lifeless. Taiki and Yū find out and investigate the DigiQuartz themselves. Gumdramon stays behind to support Tagiru and eventually carries him to where Taiki and Yū are battling FlaWizardmon. Tagiru finally gains enough passionate energy back and gives his fiery passion of spirit to Gumdramon, Super Evolving him into Arresterdramon. FlaWizardmon is finally defeated and the students and teachers get their energy back.
66	12	("Delicious or Nasty? The Digimon Ramen Contest!"); Transliteration: "Oishii? Mazui? Dejimon Rāmen Shōbu!" (Japanese: おいしい？まずい？デジモン・ラーメン勝負！)	Unknown	Shōji Yonemura	December 20, 2011
Masaru Katsuji, a boy in Tagiru's class, seems to be down lately since his family's Ramen restaurant has been getting less customers since the opening of a nearby popular Ramen restaurant opposite them. Tagiru says he will help "Katsuji" to reclaim its popularity, and he and Yū challenge each other to come up with a solution. Later that night, while trying to find a way to improve his ramen, Mr Katsuji gets sucked and absorbed into DigiQuartz by the Digimon duo of Ogremon and Fugamon. Though they own a Ramen Restaurant of their own in DigiQuartz with their special hand-pounded noodles, the two oni Digimon offer to give some to Katsuji in return for his delicious soup so both restaurants can flourish. Feeling something is off when the sudden number of customers at Katsuji, Xros Heart learns of Katsuji's deal with Ogremon and Fugamon. After learning that Katsuji willing agreed to help them, despite the three of them working 24/7 taking its toll on the man, the gang decide not to meddle as the oni Digimon are doing no wrong. However, refusing to let his father change from a kind ramen maker to a one yelling angrily at their customers, Masaru challenges his father to a Ramen Contest in which if the boy wins, Katsuji must cut off all ties with Ogremon and Fugamon. With Xros Heart's help, Masaru prepared a soup while their Digimon partners made the noodles. Upon tasting his son's soup, recognizing it as his old recipe, Mr Katsuji realizes that attracting customers isn't as important as making a ramen that warms the hearts of those who eat it, accepting defeat. However, refusing to accept their loss, Ogremon and Fugamon attempt to detain Mr Katsuji and are defeated in the resulting battling against Shoutmon, Gumdramon and Damemon before being captured by Tagiru.
67	13	("The World Trip for Children only! The Digimon Train of Dreams"); Transliteration: "Kodomo dake no Sekai Ryokō! Yume no Dejimon Torein" (Japanese: 子供だけの世界旅行！夢のデジモントレイン)	Unknown	Reiko Yoshida	December 27, 2011
Kiichi who's in the same grade as Tagiru, shows everyone his pictures of visiting different places around the world. Though their classmates are half in doubt about it, Tagiru learns later that night that Kiichi is traveling via a Locomon. Kiichi invites Tagiru to ride on Locomon, and travel around the world together along with a bunch of other kids from their school. A few days after, the students begin to doze off as Kiichi admits to Tagiru that they been using Locomon to travel on a night basis. Deciding to put a stop to it for Kiichi's own good, Tagiru, Taiki and Yū board Locomon. However, Locomon is derailed by Ren on his Pteranomon before being added to the Digimon Hunter's collection. Kiichi asks Tagiru to bring him along, and get Locomon back with him, while Gumdramon beats Airu's Parasimon and the Hunters escape. In the end, Kiichi and Locomon promise to regulate their trips with the children and their time to sleep, and become allies for Tagiru and Gumdramon.
68	14	("Gather Hunters! Digimon Competition in the Southern Island!"); Transliteration: "Hantā Daishūgō! Minami no Shima no Dejimon Sōdatsusen!" (Japanese: ハンター大集合！南の島のデジモン争奪戦！)	Unknown	Riku Sanjo	January 3, 2012
Tagiru is excited about his success at being a Digimon Hunter before the mysterious clock shop owner gives him an invitation to a contest to determine the strongest Hunter. The invitation reveals a bar code which Wisemon read to discover the location of the contest, a distant island. Tagiru, Taiki, Yū and Hideaki all travel to the island where other Hunters are gathered, learning the objective is to capture a powerful Digimon named Volcadramon. However, Volcadramon proved to be too powerful, scaring off Haruki, Noburo, and Ken and overpowering Tagiru and his friends until Kiriha suddenly appears and grabs Taiki just as he falls when the ground began to open. Kiriha leaves Taiki a warning as Taiki speculates the Clock Shop owner's plan. Meanwhile, the old man comments about the hunters to some very familiar guests...
69	15	("Want Friends? Phelesmon, the Devil's Promise"); Transliteration: "Tomodachi Hoshii? Feresumon, Akuma no Yakusoku" (Japanese: 友達欲しい？フェレスモン悪魔の約束)	Unknown	Auichi Mio	January 10, 2012
On his way to school, Tagiru meets a transfer student named Makoto Tamura who somehow has the ability to make everyone he looks at become his friends. With Yuu also affected, Tagiru and Taiki suspect a Digimon to be behind it. However, when they attempt to reach DigiQuartz, the two boys, Gumdramon, and Shoutmon find the schoolyard in DigiQuartz blocked. As it turned out, Makoto's ability to make friends was arranged by Phelesmon in the guise of an angel, who intends to perform a "Sacred Ritual of Friendship".
70	16	("Heart Racing Fear Experience! The Spirit Hunter Bellows!!"); Transliteration: "Dokidoki Kyōfu Taiken! Shinrei Hantā ga Hoeru!!" (Japanese: ドキドキ恐怖体験！心霊ハンターが吠える！！)	Unknown	Shōji Yonemura	January 17, 2012
Near an abandoned hospital as the rumors have gone around, a mysterious phone booth is a clue to a mystery. Tagiru and Yuu along with their Digimon partners go to investigate only to meet a Spirit hunter named Kaoru. Following her to an abandoned power plant to seek out answers. While they are there they run into Airu, who set traps inside. She states that her Opposumon was taken control by a ghost. As Kaoru mysteriously vanishes in thin air the Hunters don't know what's ahead of them...
71	17	("Resemblance or None at All? The Disguised Phantom Thief Betsumon"); Transliteration: "Niteru? Nitenai? Hensō Kaitō Betsumon" (Japanese: 似てる？似てない？変装怪盗ベツモン)	Unknown	Riku Sanjo	January 24, 2012
Betsumon is a thief who uses cosplay costumes to resemble other Digimon, making him wanted in the Digital World regardless of his appearance. Wanting to capture Betsumon, Tagiru joins up with the Digimon Hunters who also have business with Betsumon. However, it turns out that Betsumon is an old friend of Gumdramon's though the Digimon does not remember him and goes on the offensive.
72	18	("UFO & Dinosaur Great Gathering! Ekakimon of Dreams"); Transliteration: "Yūfō Kyōryū Daishūgō! Yume no Ekakimon" (Japanese: UFO・恐竜大集合！夢のエカキモン)	Unknown	Isao Murayama	January 31, 2012
Various cryptids have been sighted in town. Tagiru and Gumdramon discover that Ekakimon has bonded with a lonely boy named Shouta and has brought his drawings to life.
73	19	("The Great Undersea Adventure! Find the Digimon Treasure of Dreams!"); Transliteration: "Kaitei Daibōken! Yume no Zaihō Dejimon o Sagase!" (Japanese: 海底大冒険！夢の財宝デジモンを探せ！)	Unknown	Shōji Yonemura	February 7, 2012
While out fishing, Xros Heart meets a female Digimon Hunter Mizuki and her partner Submarimon. Explaining her story, Mizuki is treasure hunter who heard of a treasure within a sunken ship under Tokyo's waters. However, to defend the beautiful sea, and to obtain riches, she became a Digimon Hunter to deal with Dragomon (who is also pursuing a Plesiomon). Asking for Tagiru's help, Mizuki leads Xros Heart (with Airu accompanying them) to Dragomon's location as he is also searching for something valuable. Tagiru helps to capture Dragomon while Mizuki manages to capture Plesiomon.
74	20	("Rare Card Vanished! The Invincible RookChessmon"); Transliteration: "Rea Kādo ga Kieta! Muteki no Rūkuchesumon" (Japanese: レアカードが消えた！無敵のルークチェスモン)	Unknown	Reiko Yoshida	February 14, 2012
Kids across town have had their rare cards stolen by a mysterious masked person. Taiki, Yu, and Tagiru discover that RookChessmon is behind this. By using a child's greed for more rare cards, he feeds upon it making him stronger and making the masked person get his wants.
75	21	("The Amusement Park of Dreams, Digimon Land!"); Transliteration: "Yume no Yūenchi, Dejimon Rando!" (Japanese: 夢の遊園地、デジモンランド！)	Unknown	Aiuchi Mio	February 21, 2012
Learning of a Digimon-themed amusement park, Tagiru and Gumdramon follow a pair of Bakomon into the DigiQuartz where the Digimon Land is located. There, confronting the manager Jokermon, Tagiru and company learn that the park is a front for its owner, Sakkakumon, to swallow the energy produced from children's happiness, becoming larger and more powerful for each child he consumes in conjunction to Digimon Land's mutual expansion. Unable to land a hit due to Sakkakumon's ability to absorb enemy attacks and reflect them back three times stronger, Xros Heart is forced to fall back as Jokermon intervenes and orders the Bakomons to capture the three Digimon Hunters. However, the brown Bakomon intervenes with the fight and seals Sakkakumon's openings on his body, causing Sakkakumon's power to fade as a result. Taking advantage of the situation, OmegaShoutmon, Tsuwamon and Arresterdramon defeat Sakkakumon before both Jokermon and him are captured by Tagiru. With that, the remaining Bakomons realize their mistakes and repent.
76	22	("The Golden Insect! The Mysterious MetallifeKuwagamon"); Transliteration: "Ōgon Konchū! Metarifekuwagāmon no Nazo" (Japanese: 黄金昆虫！メタリフェクワガーモンの謎)	Unknown	Riku Sanjo	February 28, 2012
Wanting to find out the full story behind the Digimon Hunt, Xros Heart finds a lead in a mythical Digimon named MetallifeKuwagamon. Tagiru's insect-collecting classmate Kaneda enters DigiQuartz with Tagiru and Hideaki. Later on, to Kaneda's dismay, the bug he caught is actually MetallifeKuwagamon who later on takes the boy as a hostage to cover his escape. Eventually, Tagiru and the others find MetallifeKuwagamon with Arresterdramon defeating him while Tagiru saves Kaneda. However, Tagiru realizes MetallifeKuwagamon cannot be captured as the Digimon reveals that his data belongs to an evil Digimon Hunter. Suddenly, before he can reveals his master's identity, an evil being with red eyes and mouth deletes MetallifeKuwagamon before attempting to suck the Digimon Hunters into it. But at the very last minute, Taichi Yagami (who arrives with WarGreymon) and Masaru Daimon (who arrives with ShineGreymon) arrive to the Hunters' aid. With the two youths' help, Tagiru remembers his bond with Gumdramon and that allows Arresterdramon to assume his Superior Mode and destroys the evil being. Taichi and Masaru take their leave, with the former explaining to a confused Tagiru that he will know them soon enough. Meanwhile, while trying to help Nene in Hong Kong's Digi Quartz, Kiriha encounters Mimi Tachikawa and Ruki Makino as they intend to help the two in relation to the final battle about to occur in Japan very soon.
77	23	("Now Revealed! The Secret of the Digimon Hunt"); Transliteration: "Ima Akasareru! Dejimon Hanto no Himitsu" (Japanese: 今明かされる！デジモンハントの秘密)	Unknown	Riku Sanjo	March 7, 2012
What seemed to be a normal day for Tagiru goes awry when his school is being absorbed into DigiQuartz before finding a Tsumemon that Digivolves into Keramon. When Ryoma arrives, Keramon Evolves into Chrysalimon as Arresterdramon and Astamon respectively Xros Up with Ogremon and Triceramon. However, Chrysalimon spreads DigiQuartz to Tagiru's house, making his mom and dad disappear among with other people. Hearing from Ryoma that the rest of the world would follow if this continues, revealing how he got caught up with Digimon, Taiki's group and Ryoma's group join forces to free the kidnapped victims and join the others as they demand answers from a non compliant Old Clock Store Owner. By that time, Chrysalimon Super Evolved to Infermon and overpowering the Hunters' Digimon until Tagiru and Ryoma execute a Double Xros between Arresterdramon and Astamon. With Astamon's fire power, Xros Up Arresterdramon battles Infermon until it turns into the same mysterious entity seen before and combines with others into a blob from which Diablomon emerges. With Yuu, Nene and Kiriha, Taiki forms Shoutmon X7 to aid Xros Up Arresterdamon and destroy Diablomon. However, the mysterious monster transforms into its true form: Quartzmon.
78	24	("Grand Gathering of the Legendary Heroes! The Play-offs of the Digimon All Stars!!"); Transliteration: "Densetsu no Hīrō Daishūketsu! Dejimon Ōru Sutā Kessen!!" (Japanese: 伝説のヒーロー大集結！デジモンオールスター決戦!!)	Unknown	Riku Sanjo	March 14, 2012
The Old Clock Store Owner explains that to defeat Quartzmon, one of the Digimon Hunters must prove him/herself stronger than all the others to obtain the Brave Snatcher, what remained of Bagramon, and infuse it with the powers of Taiki and the five Legendary Heroes from other time-space universes who saved their respective Digital Worlds. Before sending Tagiru, Ryouma and Noboru's teams, and a few other hunters to a separate dimension, the Old Clock Store Owner gives Akari and Zenjirou their own Xros Loaders so they and the reformed Xros Heart United Army can help keep Quartzmon at bay. Finding themselves fighting an army of Myotismon clones which emerged from Quartzmon, Xros Heart forms Shoutmon DX, XrosUpBallistamon with Deputymon, XrosUpDorulumon with PawnChessmon, XrosUpTsuwamon with SuperStarmon and XrosUpMervamon with Beelzemon. The fight takes turn for the worse when some of the Myotismon digivolve into MaloMyotismon and a group of VenomMyotismon. Just when the children are about to be defeated, Masaru and his Agumon appear with Taichi and Agumon, Daisuke and Magnamon, Takuya, Takato and Guilmon. From there, the two Agumons assume their Mega forms while Takato Biomerges with Guilmon to become Dukemon while Takuya becomes Aldamon. When Magnamon reverts to Veemon, reinforcements arrive as Yamato, Ken, Grani, and Takuya's team mates enable their leaders' Digimon to become Omegamon, Imperialdramon, Dukemon Crimson Mode, and Susanoomon. After having ShineGreymon assume Burst Mode, Masaru supports ΩShoutmon in fighting some of the MaloMyotismon while Imperialdramon assumes his Fighter Mode to finish off the VenomMyotismon. Meanwhile, the other hunters step down from the dispute of who is the ultimate hunter with Tagiru and Ryouma fighting for the position. After Ryouma emerges the victor, he successfully obtains the Brave Snatcher. However, just as the six heroes prepare to fight with Ryouma and Astamon to defeat Quartzmon, Ryouma suddenly knocks down Taiki and ΩShoutmon using the Brave Snatcher while revealing that he is actually allies with Quartzmon, whose true plan is mass genocide of humanity and making DigiQuartz the new human world.
79	25	("Now Burn Up Tagiru! The Glorious Digimon Hunt!"); Transliteration: "Moeagare Tagiru! Eikō no Dejimon Hanto!" (Japanese: 燃え上がれタギル！栄光のデジモンハント！)	Unknown	Riku Sanjo	March 21, 2012
Though it seemed Ryoma had betrayed the Hunters, Astamon reveals to Tagiru he is actually Quartzmon's Terminal and has been manipulating Ryouma the entire time. Once slide-evolving into his true form, Quartzmon reveals that he used Ryouma to obtain enough Digimon data to construct his main body before fusing into it and burrowing underground to digitize the Earth for asborbing. The Old Clock Store Owner has everyone gather around him to lend the power from their Xros Loaders, while having Clockmon temporarily freeze time to halt Quartzmon's digitizing of all life on Earth long enough for Tagiru to obtain the Brave Snatcher. Taiki then passes his goggles to Tagiru, then asks him to hunt Quartzmon using the combined strength of himself and their predecessors. While the others are digitized, Tagiru and Arresterdramon proceed to hunt down Quartzmon with the latter assuming Superior Mode and Digi-Xrossing with the Brave Snatcher to break Quartzmon's core at the root. With Quartzmon reduced to a DigiEgg and everything restored, the DigiDestined, Tamers, Legendary Warriors, and DATS agents return to their universes while the Xros Heart and Hunter Digimon return to their respective human and Digital worlds. However, a month later, Gumdramon returns to the real world and is reunited with Tagiru. The Old Clock Store Owner appears in front of Taiki and Yuu, cryptically revealing himself as a resurrected Bagramon (Lord Bagra) and that his reasons for helping them was to make up amends for his role in Quartzmon's creation. He also reveals that some Digimon have remained in their world and tells them to be on their guard.
