= Digimon Fusion season 2 =

Digimon Fusion
- Season 2
- No. of episodes: 24

Release
- Original network: TV Asahi
- Original release: April 5 – September 27, 2011

Season chronology
- ← Previous; Digimon Fusion (season 1) Next → Digimon Fusion (season 3)

The following is a list of episodes for the second arc of Toei Animation's Digimon Fusion anime series. It is known in Japan as Digimon Xros Wars: The Evil Death Generals and the Seven Kingdoms (デジモンクロスウォーズ 〜悪のデスジェネラルと七つの王国〜 Aku no Desu Jeneraru to Nanatsu no Ōkoku). The second arc started airing on TV Asahi in Japan on April 5, 2011.

At the 2014 Licensing Expo, Saban confirmed that Digimon Fusion season 2 would be dubbed into English. On March 8, 2015, Digimon Fusion season 2 aired in the U.S. on Nicktoons.

The opening theme for this arc is "New World" by Twill. The series also features original music by Kousuke Yamashita as well as various insert songs sung by Kōji Wada.

== List of episodes ==
No. overall	No. in season	English Title/Original Japanese title	Directed by	Written by	Original release date	American air date
31	1	"Back to the Digital World! Hot Time in Dragonland!" ("Towards a New World! The Blazing General of Dragon Land"); Transliteration: "Arata Naru Sekai e! Karetsu Shōgun no Doragon Rando" (Japanese: 新たなる世界へ！火烈将軍のドラゴンランド)	Tetsuya Endo	Riku Sanjo	April 5, 2011	March 8, 2015
Mikey Kudo and Shoutmon return to the Digital World and land in what they learn to be known as Dragonland from Shoutmon's old friend named Lilymon. Lilymon reveals that the Digital World has been formatted by Lord Bagra into seven lands with the Bagra Army's Dark Fortress in the center. The three see a faction of the Bagra Army under the command of Dorbickmon who is known as the Fire Fury. Dorbickmon is one of the seven Dark Generals overseeing the lands. Dorbickmon pursues a deserter named Dracomon. Mikey and Shoutmon use a pseudonym named Flowerymon. Mikey and Shoutmon attempt to save Dracomon before Shoutmon finds himself unable to Digivolve. Team Blue Flare arrives with Christopher Aonuma calling out Dorbickmon. Dorbickmon uses his power to manipulate the land against them. Dorbickmon appears in his Darkness Mode One form to defeat DeckerGreymon after force DigiFusing his Flarerizamon into a flaming sword. Dorbickmon finds that Christopher has escaped thanks to the help of Mikey and company. Dorbickmon cancels his DigiFusion with Huanlongmon to have him and the Salamandermon flush them out of the tunnels. Despite Christopher putting him down for being weak, Dracomon attempts to sacrifice himself to enable the others to escape from the magma. This causes Shoutmon to Digivolve to OmniShoutmon to save Dracomon before defeating Huanglongmon and his forces. Having learned of Mikey's real identity, Dorbickmon arrives to attack them. Dorbickmon subjects OmniShoutmon to his power.
32	2	"Take a Stand, Christopher! Fusion Fighters' Rescue Mission!" ("Stand Up, Kiriha! Xros Heart's Rescue Strategy"); Transliteration: "Tachiagare Kiriha! Kurosu Hāto Dakkai Sakusen" (Japanese: 立ち上がれキリハ！クロスハート奪回作戰)	Tetsuya Endo	Riku Sanjo	April 12, 2011	March 8, 2015
With OmniShoutmon trapped, Dorbickmon assumes his Darkness Mode One form to force the Digimon back to his rookie form. Mikey Kudo, OmniShoutmon, and Christopher Aonuma are saved by who they later learn is Nene Amano. Nene used special pollen that weakens dragon type Digimon. At Nene's camp, Nene reveals that she has been disguising herself so she and the Monitamon can gather information on Dragonland. Despite the advantage, Christopher believes Dorbickmon would counter this turn of events. Christopher's assumption is proven correct when Dorbickmon announces the public execution of Mikey and Shoutmon's Fusion Fighter teammates at the waterfall, where the petals would not be effective, and the area will be heavily defended on all fronts. After Nene gains Intel from a Crabmon and Betamon in the guise of an alligator, Mikey formulates a rescue plan revolving on Dracomon to Christopher's dismay. After talking to Nene in private about Mikey's new power, Christopher learns that Dracomon is motivated by his pride and notion that the strong should help the weak with Greymon and MailBirdramon wanting to join the fray. The next day, Mikey shows up in front of Dorbickmon to start the rescue strategy with Dracomon detonating a charge that floods the area so Sparrowmon can save their allies. Hi-VisionMonitamon fires a concentrated version of the Weeping Dragon pollen. An infuriated Dorbickmon DigiFuses all his minions to assume his winged Darkness Mode Two form to pursue the Fusion Fighters. After defeating Shoutmon ×5B, Dorbickmon attempts to crush Dracomon before he is stopped by Christopher. Christopher arrives with MetalGreymon. Standing tough, Christopher's pride and refusal to back down enables him to Digivolve MetalGreymon into ZekeGreymon who manages to wound Dorbickmon fatally. Dragonland becomes the dominion of both the Fusion Fighters and Team Blue Flare as Dorbickmon dies. Dorbickmon gloats that they will stand no chance against the remaining six Dark Generals. Before heading to the next land, Nene suggests that Christopher should join forces with the Fusion Fighters as they all have a common enemy now.
33	3	"Vampire Land and the Moonlight General" ("Feel a Chill Run Down your Spine! The Moonlight General's Vampire Land"); Transliteration: "Sesuji Zowazowa! Gekkō Shōgun no Vanpaia Rando" (Japanese: 背筋ゾワゾワ！月光将軍のヴァンパイアランド)	Tetsuya Endo	Shouji Yonemura	April 19, 2011	March 15, 2015
With Dorbickmon defeated, Mikey Kudo, Christopher Aonuma, and Nene Amano open the gate to the next land with Wisemon confirming that negative energy is also passing through the gate portal towards the Code Crown. Christopher takes another route. The Fusion Fighters arrive at another land where they managed to help a Lopmon escape from a red LadyDevimon and her two LadyDevimon aides when unable to destroy them. Lopmon reveals that the area is known as Vampire Land. Many Lopmon have been living as far as they could before the Vampire Land's Dark General placed the area in perpetual night with the LadyDevimon dispatched to capture any recently Digivolved Lopmon and bring them to the castle. After the group are joined by Christopher when they attempt to protect the Chocomon from the LadyDevimon, who were obliterated by MetalGreymon before given the chance to regenerate, Mikey and Nene decide to sneak into the castle disguised as LadyDevimon with Cutemon dressed as a Lopmon to disable the castle's barrier so Christopher can launch an attack. As Christopher and MailBirdramon are attacked by Devimon, Nene and Cutemon distract a LadyDevimon. Mikey encounters the Dark General named NeoMyotismon who is known as the Moon-Light King. Lopmon follows Mikey and manages to destroy the barrier. With Shoutmon ×5 unable to fight NeoMyotismon, Christopher has MetalGreymon take over the fight. Shoutmon ×5 and Beelzemon deal with the Devimon and LadyDevimon armies. NeoMyotismon uses his Darkness Loader to absorb his forces to assume Darkness Mode One form. NeoMyotismon Darkness Mode One form overwhelms MetalGreymon with his quick regenerative powers before executing another DigiFusion with MetalGreymon. This leaves the Fusion Fighters, especially Christopher, in shock.
34	4	"Hang on, Greymon! The Rise of Shoutmon DX" ("Don't Die Greymon! Shoutmon DX is Born"); Transliteration: "Shinu na Gureimon! Shautomon Dī Kurosu Tanjō" (Japanese: 死ぬなグレイモン！シャウトモンDX誕生)	Tetsuya Endo	Shouji Yonemura	April 26, 2011	March 15, 2015
As Mikey Kudo, Christopher Aonuma, and Nene Amano find themselves in a pinch, NeoMyotismon reveals that he had made himself immortal by absorbing all the Lopmon that his forces brought to him after absorbing MetalGreymon to assume Darkness Mode Two form. NeoMyotismon was about to absorb Shoutmon ×5 when he is spooked by Lopmon making himself glow white. This allows the Fusion Fighters to escape. The Fusion Fighters learn from Lopmon that NeoMyotismon fears the legendary White Lopmon as he agrees to take them to the underground shrine where the legendary Digimon is said to reside. Before they leave, Mikey assures Christopher that they will save MetalGreymon. As Christopher and DeckerGreymon hold off NeoMyotismon's Moonlight army, Mikey's group fight their way through the tunnel leading to the chamber with Nene holding their pursuers off. Once Mikey, Shoutmon, and Lopmon arrive, they find the White Lopmon nowhere to be seen as NeoMyotismon arrives and reveals the myth to be a false hope. When Shoutmon hears MetalGreymon's melody, he sees a chance to save MetalGreymon as he allows himself to be DigiFused by NeoMyotismon alongside Lopmon. Shoutmon and Lopmon find a partially deleted MetalGreymon and convince him to escape NeoMyotismon's body. Lopmon absorbs the energies of his kin to become the White Lopmon. White Lopmon enables Shoutmon and MetalGreymon to Digivolve into OmniShoutmon and ZeekGreymon. However, OmniShoutmon and ZeekGreymon are still at a disadvantage as NeoMyotismon attempts to destroy them before they can damage him from the inside instead. However, White Lopmon sacrifices himself to transfer his power to Mikey and Christopher so that they can perform a Double Fusion. The Double Fusion allows OmniShoutmon and ZeekGreymon to become Shoutmon DX. After breaking free from NeoMyotismon, Shoutmon DX learns that the White Lopmon's data have also left NeoMyotismon's body. Shoutmon DX destroys NeoMyotismon with Beelzemon taking out the remains. With Vampire Land claimed and purified, the Fusion Fighters now have a new reason to fight together.
35	5	"The Power Drain: The Hunters of Honeyland" ("The Power is Absorbed! The Hunters of Honey Land"); Transliteration: "Pawā ga Suwareru! Hanī Rando no Kariudo-tachi" (Japanese: パワーが吸われる！ハニーランドの狩人たち)	Tetsuya Endo	Reiko Yoshida	May 3, 2011	March 22, 2015
After destroying NeoMyotismon, Mikey Kudo, Christopher Aonuma, and Nene Amano arrive to Honey Land where they encounter a group of Digimon that had their energy drained. The Fusion Fighters discover that Lilamon is under attack by a swarm of Honeybeemon who drain her energy. The Fusion Fighters try to save her, but they are stopped in their tracks by a Digimon named Ignitemon. Ignitemon weakens the Fusion Fighters' Digimon under orders from the miniature Dark General named Zamielmon who is known as the Wood Spirit. However, the arrival of a Digimon freedom fighter named Mervamon enables the group to escape. The Fusion Fighters follow Mervamon back to her shelter and discover more Digimon including Stingmon are being stung by Honeybeemon with most of their energy being drained off to become DigiHoney. With the exception of Christopher and the arrogant impression Mervamon has made from Nene's perspective, the Fusion Fighters decide to help Mervamon storm Zamielmon's fortress. However, it turns out Mervamon has no actual plan and is outright charging while luring the Honeybeemon for the Fusion Fighters to deal with. Zamielmon has learned the Fusion Fighters are the ones who defeated Dorbickmon and NeoMyotismon. Zamielmon arrives with Ignitemon. Zamielmon reveals Ignitemon to be Mervamon's younger brother. Zamielmon uses his Darkness Loader to DigiFuse his best fighter named GrandisKuwagamon with the Honeybeemon to have Ignitemon support the newly formed GrandisKuwagamon Honeybee Mode. Feeling Mervamon's pain, as Mervamon could not harm her own brother despite her resolve to save Honey Land, Nene is unable to stand by to see the suffering between the siblings. Nene manages to get Ignitemon off GrandisKuwagamon with Sparrowmon's help. Mervamon and Sparrowmon are DigiFused by Nene into JetMervamon to destroy GrandisKuwagamon. Having only joined Zamielmon out of fear and seeing no other way out, Ignitemon comes to his senses after the battle and joins the Fusion Fighters. However, Zamielmon escapes and vows revenge.
36	6	"Sweet Revenge! The Horrors of Honeyland!" ("The Laughing Hunter! General Zamielmon the Wood-Spirit"); Transliteration: "Warau Kariudo! Mokusei Shougun Zamiērumon" (Japanese: 笑う狩人！木精将軍ザミエールモン)	Tetsuya Endo	Reiko Yoshida	May 10, 2011	March 22, 2015
After Zamielmon escaped during their fight against GrandisKuwagamon, Mikey Kudo, Christopher Aonuma, and Nene Amano discuss how to defeat such a small opponent. However, Ignitemon reveals that Zamielmon eats DigiHoney to shrink with Mikey having a plan to fight the Dark General at his true size before finding an arrow with a note. Seeing the note to be an invite to Zamielmon's Honey Land Amusement Park and knowing it will be a trap, Mikey sees it to be a good way to distract Zamielmon with Christopher dealing with the DigiHoney. After Christopher sees a boy while escaping a group of Blossomon, Christopher agrees to the plan with Ignitemon and Beelzemon sent to support him. Though the plan worked, holding out until then, the Fusion Fighters learn too late that Zamielmon only ate the DigiHoney to make things challenging for himself as he is revealed as a giant. Furthermore, Zamielmon still has his super speed as he dodges Shoutmon X4 and JetMervamon's attacks. Once Christopher arrives, Shoutmon DX is formed to fight against Zamielmon with Mikey realizing a pattern in Zamielmon's movement that allows them to destroy him and his lair with JetMervamon's assistance. With Honey Land no longer under the Bagra Army's control, Mervamon thanks the Fusion Fighters while stating her intention to join their group. However, Nene soon expresses worry when Christopher describes the boy he saw while escaping a group of Blossomon. Christopher's description of the boy he saw matches Nene's younger brother named Ewan Amano.
37	7	"Ewan and the Land of Illusion" ("Brother, Why!? The Nightmarish Enemy, General Yuu"); Transliteration: "Otōto yo, Naze!? Teki Jeneraru Yuu no Akumu" (Japanese: 弟よ、なぜ！？ 敵ジェネラル・ユウの悪夢)	Tetsuya Endo	Riku Sanjo	May 17, 2011	March 29, 2015
Having heard from Christopher Aonuma that he saw a boy who resembled her younger brother named Ewan Amano, Nene Amano is eager to search for Ewan with Mikey Kudo and Christopher searching for him too. However, the Fusion Fighters find Ewan on a bridge and see him with the Bagra Army's Damemon. Shoutmon recognizes Damemon when the Digimon assumes his Tuwarmon form. Ewan and Tuwarmon take their leave with Nene chasing after her younger brother as the bridge is destroyed with Sparrowmon following Nene. The other Fusion Fighters find a way to the other side. Tuwarmon unseals his subordinate named Doumon to help Ewan by catching Nene in an illusion of Tokyo. After Nene is captured, Nene remembers how she and Ewan ended up being sucked into the Digital World. Ewan explains that he is willingly helping Axeknightmon. Ewan believes he is only playing a game with no fatal consequences as he orders Tuwarmon to delete Nene. Mervamon is revealed to have been in Nene's Fusion Loader and saves Nene. MetalGreymon manages to dispel the illusion. However, matters get worst when Axeknightmon arrives with the newly demoted Laylamon. After Ewan uses Laylamon in a forced DigiFusion with Blastmon and his Vilemon, the battle begins with Doumon using his illusion to disorient the Fusion Fighters until he is destroyed by Mervamon using her Olympia Kai after Wisemon and Hi-VisionMonitamon were DigiFused into it. Tuwarmon is DigiFused onto Axeknightmon by Ewan for Axeknightmon to become MusoKnightmon to deliver the deathblow. OmniShoutmon and ZeekGreymon charge at MusoKnightmon. OmniShoutmon and ZeekGreymon grab his cannons with the clash causing a big bang. After MusoKnightmon and Ewan depart, the fight is revealed to hone Ewan's skills. Nene makes up her mind to open Ewan's eyes to the truth. Nene wants Ewan to join the Fusion Fighters.
38	8	"Psyche-Out in Cyberland!" ("The Mysterious Cyber Land! The Beauty of Fullmetal City"); Transliteration: "Nazo no Saibā Rando! Hagane no Machi no Bishōjo" (Japanese: 謎のサイバーランド！鋼の街の美少女)	Tetsuya Endo	Shoji Yonemura	May 24, 2011	March 29, 2015
Mikey Kudo, Christopher Aonuma, and Nene Amano arrive in a futuristic kingdom known as Cyber Land. The Fusion Fighters are attacked by an army of Andromon teleported from a flying Whamon. Upon defeating the Andromon, the Fusion Fighters realize their opponents are only puppet replicas as they disable Whamon's teleporter device and learn it is actually an airship. Dorulumon senses a Digimon nearby with the Fusion Fighters finding a strange girl hiding in an airshaft. Introducing herself as Luca, she explains that they are in Cyber Land while explaining she was captured by the Bagra Army when they invaded. Dorulumon expresses some distrust towards Luca. Dorulumon is forced to apologize to Luca by the Fusion Fighters. The Fusion Fighters welcome Luca warmly. The Fusion Fighters leave the airship with Luca guiding them to a warehouse where food is kept. Luca appeared to activate numerous booby traps before putting in the correct entry code. The Fusion Fighters are unaware that they have fallen into a trap. The actions of the Fusion Fighters are observed by Cyber Land's Dark General. Dorulumon's distrust for Luca unwillingly saves the Fusion Fighters twice despite their disappointment in him making Luca cry. When Dorulumon chases after Luca, she offers to scout for them. Dorulumon ends up being paralyzed by someone posing as Cutemon. Dorulumon learns that "Cutemon" is actually the shape shifting Dark General named Splashmon who is known as the Water Tiger. Furthermore, Luca is revealed as a puppet controlled by one of Splashmon's Splasher familiars as he absorbs the blob. Splashmon explains his intent to use Dorulumon's negative energy. Splashmon defeats Dorulumon. Splashmon spares Dorulumon to watch what he has planned for the Fusion Fighters. The Fusion Fighters find themselves facing replica Andromon and replica Sealsdramon before a second wave composed of MetalTyrannomon appear while led by what appears to be Dorulumon.
39	9	"The Water Tiger's Slippery Trap!" ("Xros Heart Break up Crisis! Water Tiger General's Despicable Trap"); Transliteration: "Kurosu Hāto Bunretsu no Kiki! Suiko Shōgun no Hiretsuna Wana" (Japanese: クロスハート分裂の危機！水虎将軍の卑劣なワナ)	Tetsuya Endo	Shoji Yonemura	May 31, 2011	April 5, 2015
Having captured Dorulumon, Splashmon assumes his captive's form to lead an attack on Mikey Kudo, Christopher Aonuma, and Nene Amano. After Splashmon's MetalTyrannomon are defeated, Splashmon creates a story as Dorulumon to claim he was feigning switching sides to find the Dark General. After Christopher takes his leave, Mikey allows "Dorulumon" to rejoin the Fusion Fighters after his attempt on their lives. Splashmon captures Nene and takes her Fusion Loader. Splashmon poses as Nene to lure Mikey, Shoutmon, and Ballistamon into a death trap before assuming Mikey's form to do the same thing to Christopher. Splashmon's deception is exposed when "Mikey" fakes an injury. Christopher realizes he is an impostor. Mikey arrives and reveals that he knew of Splashmon's deception the entire time since meeting Luca and played along while sending Cutemon and Deputymon to free Dorulumon and Nene. Splashmon is furious that his plan failed. The Fusion Fighters express a bit of pity for Splashmon's solitary lifestyle. Splashmon reveals he had the original occupants of Cyber Land kill each other. Splashmon absorbs his Splashers in a DigiFusion to assume his gigantic Darkness Mode before easily defeating MetalGreymon and being unharmed by Shoutmon ×4 and Jet Mervamon's attacks. After Splashmon reveals his true Water Tiger form, Splashmon Darkness Mode overpowers OmniShoutmon and ZeekGreymon before Mikey figures out Splashmon's weakness. OmniShoutmon and ZeekGreymon are DigiFused into Shoutmon DX. Shoutmon DX destroys Splashmon Darkness Mode via evaporation. Dorulumon expresses some respect of Mikey's sense of loyalty and friendship to him.
40	10	"Gold Land and the Irate Pirate!" ("Cheerful Pirates Appear! Set Sail for Gold Land!!"); Transliteration: "Yōki na Kaizoku, Arawaru! Gōrudo Rando no Kōkai!!" (Japanese: 陽気な海賊、現る！ゴールドランドの航海！！)	Tetsuya Endo	Riku Sanjo	June 7, 2011	April 5, 2015
After landing in the Gold Land, which contains a wide Golden Sea, Mikey Kudo, Christopher Aonuma, and Nene Amano find no traces of the Dark General's flag before a pirate ship rises from underwater. On the pirate ship is the Dark General named Olegmon who is known as the Gold Thief. Olegmon has heard of the Fusion Fighters. Olegmon wishes to have the Fusion Fighters join his crew. The Fusion Fighters refuse Olegmon's offer. The Fusion Fighters start attacking Olegmon's crew to take his ship. The Fusion Fighters find Lunamon, Spadamon, and Coronamon hypnotized as the Dark General's grunts. Olegmon proceeds to place Shoutmon, Greymon, Sparrowmon, Cutemon, Starmon, the Pickmonz, Knightmon, and the PawnChessmon under his chantey's spell. This forces the rest of the Fusion Fighters to escape with Ballistamon's help, as he is unaffected. Olegmon recognizes Ballistamon. The Fusion Fighters go into hiding as Olegmon sends his first mate named Mermaimon to hunt them down. The Fusion Fighters speculate that Olegmon's spell does not affect humans and machine type Digimon with Christopher seeing Cyberdramon to be ideal. The next day, Lilymon finds Ballistamon and thinks back to how she and Shoutmon met Ballistamon prior. The Fusion Fighters find themselves under attack as Olegmon manages to get Dorulumon and Cyberdramon under his control to the Fusion Fighters' shock. During the struggle between Ballistamon and Shoutmon, Olegmon's control over the Fusion Fighter Digimon is revealed that the source of Olegmon's spell is a sound wave emitted from his horns. After breaking free from the hypnosis, the enraged Shoutmon Digivolves into OmniShoutmon and battles against Olegmon before the Olegmon's crew grabs Ballistamon. Olegmon's crew proceeds to rewire Ballistamon's insides. Olegmon reveals Ballistamon to be his long lost secret weapon. Ballistamon is forced to transform back into his original form known as DarkVolumon.
41	11	"Ballistamon's Bad News Blast From the Past!" ("Olegmon the Gold Thief Laughs! Farewell Xros Heart!"); Transliteration: "Kinzoku no Orēgumon ga Warau! Saraba Kurosu Hāto!" (Japanese: 金賊のオレーグモンが笑う！ さらばクロスハート！)	Tetsuya Endo	Riku Sanjo	June 14, 2011	April 5, 2015
After his crew capture and rewire Ballistamon back into his original state, Olegmon reveals that he created DarkVolumon to aid him. DarkVolumon's attack somehow traversed him into the Forest Zone, where he was repaired by Shoutmon into Ballistamon. Despite Christopher Aonuma's intervention with Deckerdramon and MailBirdramon, they and OmniShoutmon are all sent flying into the ocean. Olegmon captures Mikey Kudo and enslaves the rest of the Fusion Fighter Digimon. Olegmon explains that he wants Mikey to join his crew. Olegmon decides to subject the captured Nene Amano to DarkVolumon's restored ultimate speaker attack after Mikey turned him down. After convincing Christopher to let him assist in the rescue, Shoutmon attempts to rewrite DarkVolumon as MailBirdramon and Dracomon save Nene. Christopher saves Mikey and uses Deckerdramon to damage the ship. Though Shoutmon attempts to reach Ballistamon via DigiFusion, it appeared to have no effect. Ballistamon comes to his senses at the last second. Ballistamon provides his speakers for Shoutmon to free all their allies from Olegmon's spell. While MetalGreymon and JetMervamon take out Olegmon's crew, Shoutmon ×4S has trouble fighting against Olegmon. In a gamble, Ballistamon cancels the DigiFusion to use his ultimate speaker attack on Olegmon. The dying Olegmon accepts his death. Olegmon praises the Fusion Fighters as they are joined by Spadamon, Lunamon, and Coronamon before they repair the pirate ship. The Fusion Fighters use the pirate ship to enter the next land.
42	12	"Deep Trouble in Canyon Land!" ("Whispering to Kiriha! Earth-god General of the Canyon, The Devil's Invitation!"); Transliteration: "Kiriha ni Sasayaku! Kyōkoku no Doshin Shōgun, Akuma no Yūi!" (Japanese: キリハにささやく！峡谷の土神将軍、魔の誘い！)	Tetsuya Endo	Shouji Yonemura	June 21, 2011	July 5, 2015
Mikey Kudo, Christopher Aonuma, and Nene Amano arrive in Canyon Land. The Fusion Fighters find the Dark General named Gravimon who is known as the Earth Spirit. Gravimon has his army of Hippogriffomon, Cerberumon, and Wendigomon stationed around his fortress in preparation for the Fusion Fighters' arrival. Christopher voices his intention to prove his strength. Christopher reveals his plan to take Gravimon's fortress by surprise. The Fusion Fighters serve as distractions to lure Gravimon's army outside the fortress. Despite all the other Fusion Fighters' objections, Mikey accepts the plan. The Fusion Fighters carry out Christopher's plan. Nene and JetMervamon deal with the Hippogriffomon. Dorulumon and Beelzemon hold off the Cerberumon. Mikey, Shoutmon, and Ballistamon distract the Wendigomon. Christopher acts on his own whim to take out the opposition with his allies caught in the crossfire. Christopher and MetalGreymon reach Gravimon. Christopher takes out Gravimon's forces as Mikey and his group arrives. Revealing he was a step ahead since MetalGreymon destroyed an illusion, Gravimon unveils his army of Centarumon and Sagittarimon. Despite JetMervamon helping the Fusion Fighters escape, Mikey learns that Christopher is captured by Gravimon. Furthermore, Gravimon reveals that Bagramon is the one who gave Christopher his Fusion Loader. Gravimon uses Christopher's shady past and desire to prove his strength to turn him into his pawn to defeat Mikey and the other Fusion Fighters.
43	13	"Great Fusion! The Power of Friendship" ("The Mighty Love! Deckerdramon's Final Scream!!"); Transliteration: "Tsuyoki Ai o! Dekkādoramon Saigo no Sakebi!!" (Japanese: 強き愛を！デッカードラモン最期の叫び！！)	Tetsuya Endo	Shouji Yonemura	July 4, 2011	July 5, 2015
Though tricked by Gravimon to attack Mikey Kudo and Nene Amano, Christopher Aonuma admits that he would have to confront Mikey even after they defeated Bagramon and his army. Despite Mikey's reluctance to fight, tensions run high as a battle between OmniShoutmon and ZeekGreymon breaks out with OmniShoutmon barely winning as both are loaded into their generals' Fusion Loaders to heal. Despite OmniShoutmon and ZeekGreymon being injured, Christopher refuses to stop. Christopher summons Cyberdramon and Golemon before Deckerdramon stops them. Deckerdramon reasons with Christopher while having the Fusion Fighters leave. Christopher considers Deckerdramon's attempt to convince him to be untwisted by his past as an act of betrayal. Christopher has Cyberdramon and Golemon mortally wound Deckerdramon before Mikey intervenes. Deckerdramon reveals Christopher's past to Mikey and Nene. Deckerdramon explains to Christopher that his father wanted him to be strong out of love. As Christopher begins to realize his father's intent and that true strength is from love and friendship, the Fusion Fighters are attacked by Gravimon with Deckerdramon fatally wounded when he shields Mikey, Christopher, and Nene from Gravimon's gravity ball. Deckerdramon dies due to the impact of Gravimon's attack. Deckerdramon's final action gave Christopher and the other Fusion Fighters the ability to Great Fusion OmniShoutmon and ZeekGreymon with Ballistamon, Dorulumon, Sparrowmon, Starmon, and the Pickmonz to form Shoutmon ×7.
44	14	"Regeneration Frustration!" ("The Bond of X7! The Sublime Battle with Gravimon!!"); Transliteration: "Kizuna no Kurosu Sebun! Gurabimon no Sōzetsu Batoru!!" (Japanese: きずなの×7！グラビモンとの壮絶バトル！！)	Tetsuya Endo	Reiko Yoshida	July 11, 2011	July 12, 2015
Fueled by Deckerdramon's death, Christopher Aonuma's restored bond with Mikey Kudo and Nene Amano allows them to form Shoutmon ×7 and wipe out a majority of Gravimon's army. Though Shoutmon ×7 manages to destroy Gravimon, Gravimon's hold over Canyon Land is still secure. Hi-VisionMonitamon is sent to investigate Gravimon's castle. Hi-VisionMonitamon witnesses Gravimon regenerating from a surviving cable. Hi-VisionMonitamon relays that Gravimon can regenerate himself as long as his DigiCore is safe. The Fusion Fighters witness the capture of Hi-VisionMonitamon by Anubismon. Anubismon relays Gravimon's challenge to the Fusion Fighters. As Mikey DigiFuses Cutemon with Dondokomon, Knightmon, PawnChessmons, Beastmon, ChibiTortomon, and Jijimon to form Greatest Cutemon to hold off Gravimon's army, Shoutmon ×7 battles Gravimon. Christopher and Nene sneak into Gravimon's castle to save Hi-VisionMonitamon. The rescue team finds no sign of Gravimon's DigiCore and regroups as Gravimon DigiFuses his remaining forces to assume Darkness Mode. Gravimon Darkness Mode reveals that he secretly transplanted his DigiCore into Mikey's left arm during the last battle. Agreeing to Gravimon's demands when he could not harm Mikey, Christopher relinquishes his Fusion Loader to save Mikey's life. When Gravimon attempts to kill Christopher, Mikey shields Christopher. Mikey tricks Gravimon to remove his Digicore so it can be heavily damaged by Shoutmon ×7. Christopher crushes Gravimon's core in his hand. Gravimon is finally defeated for good. All the Fusion Fighters have one more land to go to before they finally reach the Bagra Army's Headquarters.
45	15	"Dark Side of the Sun" ("The Final Kingdom, the Shining Sun of Bright Land!"); Transliteration: "Saigo no Ōkoku, Kagayaku Taiyō no Buraito Rando!" (Japanese: 最後の王園、輝く太陽のブライトランド！)	Tetsuya Endo	Riku Sanjo	July 18, 2011	July 12, 2015
Mikey Kudo, Christopher Aonuma, and Nene Amano arrive to the last kingdom in the Digital World known as Bright Land. The Fusion Fighters start heading towards Bright Land's tower. Sparrowmon informs the Fusion Fighters that a barrier has prevented her from reaching the top of the tower while finding Bright Land's Digimon that was pinned down to the ground by big spikes. One of the resident Digimon reveals that only the last Dark General named Apollomon can remove them. Apollomon's two captains named Marusumon and Sethmon appear with their army. The army of Marusumon and Sethmon commences a battle against the Fusion Fighters that ends in Sethmon's defeat. Seeing the Fusion Fighters' strength first hand, Apollomon grants them an audience with him on Bright Land tower's garden. Apollomon reveals he had only acted to protect his subjects. Apollomon asks the Fusion Fighters to help him stop Bagramon from executing D5 within a few days' time. Mikey believes the Fusion Fighters can trust Apollomon. Christopher and Nene only go along after seeing Apollomon risking his own life to protect Mikey during a battle the two instigated. Ewan Amano and Tuwarmon appear in front of the Fusion Fighters. Ewan reveals that Bagramon and Axeknightmon infected Apollomon with an evil virus program named Whispered that has activated. Apollomon Whispered killed Marusumon. Apollomon Whispered gives Ewan and Tuwarmon access to Bright Land's tower. Apollomon pleads the Fusion Fighters to destroy him before he is quickly subdued by Apollomon Whispered. Mikey finds himself devoid of the conviction to use his Fusion Loader to perform Great Fusion. The Fusion Fighters are sent into the Digital Underworld.
46	16	"The Dark Side of Bright Land" ("Dead or Alive, the Hellish General's Decisive Battle!"); Transliteration: "Shō ka Shi ka, Jigoku no Jeneraru Kessen!" (Japanese: 生か死か、地獄のジェネラル決戦！)	Tetsuya Endo	Riku Sanjo	July 25, 2011	July 19, 2015
Falling into the Digital Underworld below Bright Land, Mikey Kudo, Christopher Aonuma, and Nene Amano find themselves coming to a white castle with a crystal in the middle of the throne room. The crystal projects a hologram of Ewan Amano as he explains the Digital Underworld will be where his army will have a final battle against the Fusion Fighters. Ewan explains to the Fusion Fighters that the losing group's general would die upon defeat. Christopher makes the decision to accept Ewan's offer, which shocks Mikey and Nene. Christopher formulates a plan. Christopher explains to Mikey and Nene that Ewan needs to understand that his choices have consequences. As the battles take off, Knightmon and his PawnChessmon hold off the Sun Wheel army. Shoutmon ×5, Beelzemon, and Mervamon battle Axeknightmon and Laylamon. Christopher and Cyberdramon are intercepted en route by Apollomon Whispered and Sethmon. Though Ewan predicted this strategy, he did not realize that Christopher is using himself as a distraction for Mikey to use MetalGreymon to raid the black castle. As MetalGreymon holds off Tuwarmon, Mikey chases a terrified Ewan. Ewan gets a sword with the intent to settle things out in a sword duel by outright killing Mikey.
47	17	"The Battle of the Young Generals" ("Taiki VS. Yuu! Showdown of the Boy Generals!!"); Transliteration: "Taiki vs Yuu! Shōnen Jeneraru Taiketsu!!" (Japanese: タイキvsユウ、少年ジェネラル対決！！)	Tetsuya Endo	Riku Sanjo	August 9, 2011	July 19, 2015
Mikey Kudo ends up facing Ewan Amano in a sword fight before Apollomon Whispered appears. Apollomon Whispered reveals Christopher Aonuma's defeat. Axeknightmon splits into his components once victory is at hand. Axeknightmon and Laylamon have overwhelmed Shoutmon ×5, Beelzemon, and Mervamon. As Apollomon Whispered proceeds to assist Tuwarmon and Axemon against fighting MetalGreymon, Ewan reveals that all he wanted was a world where no one dies. Ewan found such a place in the Digital World. Mikey now understands Christopher's logic in sending him to face Ewan. Mikey proceeds to disarm Ewan before punching him in the face to explain to him that Axeknightmon lied to him. After Shoutmon ×5 defeats SkullKnightmon with Mervamon accompanying them, Beelzemon deals with Laylamon. Nene Amano arrives to the black castle to help further convince Ewan. Ewan refuses to believe in what Mikey and Nene are saying to him. Ewan orders Tuwarmon to DigiFuse with Axemon while absorbing Apollomon Whispered's minions and the energies of the Digital Underworld to become Tuwarmon Beast Mode. Christopher arrives to assist Mikey and Nene. Shoutmon ×7 causes a lot of damage on Tuwarmon as he is forced to cancel the DigiFusion. Tuwarmon escapes with Ewan. Axemon is crushed under the crumbling black castle. The Fusion Fighters know they need to find Ewan as they are rejoined by Beelzemon. Beelzemon conceals a mortal injury from all the Fusion Fighters. At the same time, Ewan begins to doubt his faith in Axeknightmon. Tuwarmon is revealed to be dying from his wounds.
48	18	"Beelzemon's Revenge" ("Beelzebumon, Fade into Light!"); Transliteration: "Beruzebumon, Hikari ni Kiyu!" (Japanese: ベルゼブモン、光に消ゆ！)	Tetsuya Endo	Riku Sanjo	August 16, 2011	July 26, 2015
Christopher Aonuma and Nene Amano search for Ewan Amano. A still wounded Beelzemon joins the search with Mervamon accompanying him. Mikey Kudo and Wisemon are working on a way to leave the Digital Underworld without Mikey or Ewan needing to die. Having been left for dead after Laylamon and Beelzemon gravely wounded each other, Laylamon refuses to accept defeat. Laylamon accepts Apollomon Whispered's offer to force DigiFuse her with Blastmon and the Digital Underworld's energies to assume her Evilbeast form to exact her revenge on Beelzemon. SkullKnightmon takes and protects a conflicted Ewan away when he and Damemon attempted to find Apollomon Whispered. Seeing the monstrous threat Evilbeast Laylamon poses as she creates a black hole, Beelzemon and Mervamon hold her at bay. Shoutmon ×7 protects the black and white castles after Wisemon reveals the black and white castles to be relays to open the digital portal to leave the Digital Underworld. Once Wisemon hacks the black and white castles to access the data command to open the digital portal, he explains to Mikey that he would need to risk himself to give false death data. The digital portal opens with Mikey collapsed from the strain. SkullKnightmon flees with the Fusion Fighters following him and Ewan. Though Evilbeast Laylamon's body is destroyed, her core digital data endures. Evilbeast Laylamon pursues Beelzemon before Beelzemon reveals his injuries are beyond Cutemon's ability to heal him. Beelzemon remains behind to sacrifice himself to finish Evilbeast Laylamon for good. Mikey comes to his senses after all the Fusion Fighters escape the Digital Underworld. Mikey realizes Beelzemon is dead.
49	19	"The Darkest Dark General of All!" ("Taiki's Decision! Surpass the Strongest Apollomon!"); Transliteration: "Taiki no Keddan! Saikyō no Aporomon o Koeru!" (Japanese: タイキの決断！最強のアポロモンを超えろ！)	Tetsuya Endo	Riku Sanjo	August 23, 2011	July 26, 2015
As SkullKnightmon takes Ewan Amano to the Bagra Army's base, Mikey Kudo, Christopher Aonuma, and Nene Amano know that they have to deal with Apollomon Whispered. Mikey is left with no choice but to destroy Apollomon and Apollomon Whispered together after learning from Wisemon that there is no way to separate the two of them. Apollomon Whispered believes the Fusion Fighters, Axeknightmon, and Ewan died in the Digital Underworld. Apollomon Whispered believes he will become Bagramon's second in command. Apollomon Whispered gave an opening for the Fusion Fighters to exploit when he sends his entire military forces to the ground level of Bright Land to slaughter the Bright Land residents. As ZeekGreymon and JetMervamon deal with the Sun Wheel army, Mikey and his group make their way to Apollomon's throne room. Apollomon Whispered attempted to pretend to be Apollomon to catch Mikey off guard. The ploy fails as the Fusion Fighters regroup to form Shoutmon ×7. An epic battle ensues before Apollomon Whispered traps Shoutmon ×7. Apollomon Whispered creates a miniature dark sun to incinerate Bright Land. Though a freed Shoutmon ×7 is unable to hold the attack off, Apollomon mustered enough strength to restrain Apollomon Whispered so that they can both be destroyed quickly. With Apollomon Whispered no more, a dying Apollomon uses his last breath to thank the Fusion Fighters. Apollomon warns all the Fusion Fighters to beware of Bagramon and his intent to turn all the Digimon into his slaves. Meanwhile, a reformed Axeknightmon learns of Apollomon's death. Axeknightmon plots his next move. Ewan finally accepts the truth before being powerless to stop Damemon from dying before his eyes.
50	20	"Prison Land" ("Resurrect! The Appearance of all Seven Death Generals!"); Transliteration: "Yomigaeru! Shichinin no Desu Jeneraru Sōtōjō!!" (Japanese: よみがえる！七人のデスジェネラル総登場！！)	Tetsuya Endo	Shouji Yonemura	August 30, 2011	August 2, 2015
After the defeat of all seven Dark Generals, Mikey Kudo, Christopher Aonuma, and Nene Amano head to the Bagra Army's Headquarters named Pandemonia. Bagramon has been expecting the Fusion Fighters to arrive at Pandemonia. Bagramon turns out to be an illusion with Axeknightmon dealing with them. Axeknightmon reveals the Dark Stone, which is the Code Crown that had been infused with the negative energy collected by all seven Dark Generals. Axeknightmon uses the Dark Stone to revive all the soulless seven Dark Generals. Shoutmon ×7 is formed to hold all the soulless seven Dark Generals off. Axeknightmon DigiFuses all the soulless seven Dark Generals into GrandGeneramon. GrandGeneramon is a destructive beast that cancels out Shoutmon's DigiFusion. Axeknightmon utilizes the Dark Stone to take away Shoutmon's soul, which is his DigiCore. Axeknightmon attempts to remove Mikey's soul with Dorulumon and Ballistamon sacrificing themselves to prevent Mikey's soul from being removed. However, Mikey is willing to let Axeknightmon have his soul removed. Mikey ends up in Prison Land. Mikey encounters the seven Dark Generals' DigiCores who want their revenge on him. Shoutmon, Dorulumon, and Ballistamon appear to protect Mikey. A rematch between Shoutmon, Dorulumon, and Ballistamon and the actual seven Dark Generals begins immediately.
51	21	"Rotten To The Digi-Core!" ("For the Future of the Digital World! The Friendship with the Death Generals!"); Transliteration: "Dejitaru Wārudo no Mirai no Tame ni! Desu Jeneraru to no Yūjō!" (Japanese: デジタルワールドの未来のために！デスジェネラルとの友情！)	Tetsuya Endo	Shouji Yonemura	September 6, 2011	August 2, 2015
In Prison Land, the seven Dark Generals defeated Shoutmon ×3 so easily. Moved by the act of sacrificing themselves, Olegmon switches sides to support Mikey Kudo against his former teammates. Apollomon is separated from Apollomon Whispered to settle their own battle. At the same time, Axeknightmon intends not to keep his word to Mikey to spare all his friends. Axeknightmon orders GrandGeneramon to defeat Christopher Aonuma and Nene Amano. Apollomon sacrifices himself to help Mikey and his Fusion Fighter Digimon along with Olegmon in restoring themselves. Olegmon died again in the process when the Fusion Fighter team destroyed the incomplete GrandGeneramon. The Fusion Fighters' fight against all seven Dark Generals is truly over. Mikey, Christopher, and Nene head to the actual Pandemonia to defeat Bagramon and Axeknightmon. All the Fusion Fighters are trying to rescue Nene's younger brother named Ewan Amano successfully.
52	22	"D5 and the Brotherhood of Evil" ("Bagra Brothers! The Bond of Evil"); Transliteration: "Bagura Kyōdai! Ankoku no Kizuna" (Japanese: バグラ兄弟、暗黒の絆)	Tetsuya Endo	Riku Sanjo	September 13, 2011	August 9, 2015
Ewan Amano is captured by Axeknightmon inside the Pandemonia. Ewan's power is collected by Axeknightmon. Mikey Kudo, Christopher Aonuma, and Nene Amano finally meet Lord Bagra and Axeknightmon outside the palace of Pandemonia. Lord Bagra has already absorbed the Dark Stone. Lord Bagra appears before the Fusion Fighters. Lord Bagra reveals the meaning behind D5. Lord Bagra uses Tactimon's sword known as Jatetsufūjinmaru that fell into the ocean after his battle with OmniShoutmon as a homing beacon. Lord Bagra opens a rift into the human world. Lord Bagra freezes everything near his extended arm. All the energy is drained by Lord Bagra's extended arm. Angie Hinomoto and Jeremy Tsurgi are saved by a mysterious voice. Mikey and Mervamon fall into the underground in the midst of all the chaos. Christopher orders OmniShoutmon and ZeekGreymon to battle against Lord Bagra. Axeknightmon takes advantage of the distraction. Axeknightmon stabs Lord Bagra from the back. Axeknightmon proceeds to force DigiFuse Lord Bagra. Axeknightmon wants to absorb his brother's power. Lord Bagra is Axeknightmon's older brother.
53	23	"The Darkness Before the Dawn" ("It Approaches! The Human World's Doomsday, D5"); Transliteration: "Semarikuru! Ningenkai no Saigo no Hi, Dī Faibu!!" (Japanese: 迫りくる！人間界の最期の日、D5！！)	Tetsuya Endo	Riku Sanjo	September 20, 2011	August 9, 2015
Axeknightmon absorbed his older brother who is known as Lord Bagra in a forced DigiFusion. Axeknightmon reveals that he unsealed the Darkness Loader. Axeknightmon used Nene Amano and Ewan Amano to overthrow Lord Bagra. Axeknightmon wants to become the new ruler of the Digital World. Mikey Kudo managed to rescue Ewan from the enlarged Tyutyumon. Tyutyumon was devoured by Beastmon. Mikey rejoins the other Fusion Fighters. Mikey brings Ewan back to Nene and Christopher Aonuma. Axeknightmon's new form is known as Darkest Axeknightmon. Darkest Axeknightmon is confronted by Shoutmon ×7. Lord Bagra metaphysically destroys Axeknightmon. Lord Bagra takes control of his younger brother's body. Lord Bagra reconfigures Axeknightmon's body into Megadarkness Bagramon. Megadarkness Bagramon deletes his surroundings. Megadarkness Bagramon heads into the human world. Megadarkness Bagramon had already turned everything into stone. In the process, Megadarkness Bagramon kills Shoutmon. Megadarkness Bagramon sends all the Fusion Fighters into a void. In the void, Mikey, Christopher, Nene, and Ewan were saved by Angie Hinomoto and Jeremy Tsurgi. Angie and Jeremy were transported by the power of two DigiMemories known as WarGreymon and Examon that came back to life. WarGreymon and Examon suggest to all the Fusion Fighters that there are ways to bring Shoutmon back to life. WarGreymon and Examon also suggest to all the Fusion Fighters that there may be a way save both the human and digital worlds.
54	24	"Final Fusion – The Fight for Earth!" ("Grab the DigiXros of Glory! Our Future!"); Transliteration: "Eikō no DejiKurosu, Tsukame! Oretachi no Mirai!!" (Japanese: 栄光のデジクロス、つかめ！おれたちの未来！！)	Tetsuya Endo	Riku Sanjo	September 27, 2011	August 16, 2015
Mikey Kudo, Christopher Aonuma, Nene Amano, Ewan Amano, Angie Hinomoto, and Jeremy Tsurgi are transported back to Earth by the DigiMemories of Examon and WarGreymon. Examon reveals Lord Bagra's plan. Examon also reveals the forming of all the DigiMemories. Ewan's Darkness Loader is transformed into a yellow Fusion Loader. Examon and WarGreymon's DigiMemories revive Omnimon's DigiMemory. A decisive battle begins between the Fusion Fighters United Army and the Bagra Army. Mikey, Angie, and Cutemon enter into Megadarkness Bagramon's body. Mikey, Angie, and Cutemon search for Shoutmon inside Megadarkness Bagramon's body. Mikey, Angie, and Cutemon encounter a metaphysical Bagramon. Mikey is nearly killed by the metaphysical Bagramon. The Dark Stone is purified into the Code Crown. The Code Crown brings every Digimon including Shoutmon back to life. The Code Crown sends Mikey and his team members out of Megadarkness Bagramon's body. The Code Crown guides the Fusion Fighters to execute a new DigiFusion. The Fusion Fighters execute a DigiFusion known as Final DigiFusion. Shoutmon is DigiFused with all the Digimon to form Shoutmon ×7 Superior Mode. Megadarkness Bagramon is destroyed for good. Everything is turned back to normal. All the Fusion Fighters say goodbye to Shoutmon and all the other Fusion Fighter Digimon. Every Digimon returns to the Digital World. Mikey has a feeling that his adventures are not over yet.
