= Trefle =

Japanese project group

- Origin: Japan
- Genres: Anison
- Years active: 2013–2016
- Labels: Second Shot (2013-2015); Feel Mee (2015-2016)
- Past members: Yui Kano; Yui Ishikawa; Chihiro Ikki; Nanami Kashiyama; Yukari Goto; Eri Suzuki; Minami Takahashi; Karin Takahashi; Ayumi Takamune; Marina Tanoue
- Website: trefle.secondshot.jp

Trefle (トレフル, Torefuru) was a Japanese project group formed by Second Shot in 2013. The group featured voice and stage actresses from various talent agencies and were promoted through the online radio program A&G Girls Project Trefle. The group's original line-up consisted of Yui Kano, Yui Ishikawa, Chihiro Ikki, Yukari Goto, Minami Takahashi, and Marina Tanoue. Nanami Kashiyama, Eri Suzuki, Karin Takahashi, and Ayumi Takamune were added as members in April 2014. The group disbanded on October 5, 2016.

== History ==
Trefle was created as a girl group featuring voice actresses Yui Kano, Yui Ishikawa, Chihiro Ikki, Yukari Goto, Minami Takahashi, and Marina Tanoue, who are all part of different talent agencies. The group was promoted through the online radio program A&G Girls Project Trefle. Trefle released their first album, Anison Kamikyoku + ChainChro on October 23, 2013, which also featured a collaboration with Chain Chronicle. In April 2014, Nanami Kashiyama, Eri Suzuki, Karin Takahashi, and Ayumi Takamune were added as members. On September 26, 2014, they released their second album, Anison Kamikyoku +.

Afterwards, Trefle changed labels from Second Shot to Feel Mee. On November 18, 2015, they released their first single, "Butter-Fly", a cover of Kōji Wada's 1999 debut single. On April 6, 2016, they released their second single, "Sakura."

On July 29, 2016, the official website announced that after discussion with the members, Trefle would disband after their final concert on October 5, 2016. They released their final album, Final Project, on September 28, 2016.

== Members ==
- Yui Kano (鹿野優以)
- Yui Ishikawa (石川由依)
- Chihiro Ikki (一木千洋)
- Nanami Kashiyama (柏山奈々美)
- Yukari Goto (後藤友香里)
- Eri Suzuki (鈴木絵理)
- Minami Takahashi (高橋未奈美)
- Karin Takahashi (高橋花林)
- Ayumi Takamune (高宗歩未)
- Marina Tanoue (田上真里奈)

== Discography ==
=== Studio albums ===
Title	Year	Details	Peak chart positions	Sales
Title	Year	Details	JPN	Sales
Anison Kamikyoku + ChainChro (アニソン神曲+チェンクロ)	2013	Released: October 23, 2013; Label: Second Shot; Format: CD; Track listing: 1. "Fight!"; 2. "Genesis of Aquarion" (創聖のアクエリオン); 3. "You Get to Burning"; 4. "Sora-iro Days" (空色デイズ); 5. "Seikan Hikō" (星間飛行); 6. "Blue Water"; 7. "Kizuna no Monogatari" (キズナの物語); 8. "Kizuna no Monogatari" (キズナの物語) (instrumental)	19	—
Anison Kamikyoku + (アニソン神曲+)	2014	Released: September 26, 2014; Label: Second Shot; Format: CD; Track listing: 1. "Aozora no Namida" (青空のナミダ); 2. "1/3 no Junjō na Kanjō" (1/3の純情な感情); 3. "Angel Night (Tenshi no Iru Basho)" (Angel Night～天使のいる場所～); 4. "Platinum" (プラチナ); 5. "Rondo-Revolution" (輪舞-revolution); 6. "Successful Mission"; 7. "Butter-Fly"; 8. "Zettai! Part 2" (絶対!Part2); 9. "Condition Green (Kinkyuu Hashin)" (コンディション・グリーン〜緊急発進〜); 10. "Soredemo Ashita wa Yattekuru" (それでも明日はやってくる); 11. "Eternal Wind (Hohoemi wa Hikaru Kaze no Naka)" (ETERNAL WIND〜ほほえみは光る風の中〜)	—	—
Final Project	2016	Released: September 28, 2016; Label: Feel Mee; Format: CD; Track listing: 1. "Butter-Fly"; 2. "Sing Sing"; 3. "Itsuka no Sora ni" (いつかの空に); 4. "The One Step Shining Star"; 5. "Shunka Shūtō" (春夏秋冬); 6. "Kimi no Yobu Namae" (君の呼ぶ名前); 7. "Guilty"; 8. "Sora Fuku Asa ni..." (風吹く朝に…); 9. "Sakura" (桜); 10. "One Time"; 11. "Naisho no Emprise" (内緒のエンペリーゼ)	157	—
"—" denotes releases that did not chart or were not released in that region.

=== Singles ===
Title	Year	Peak chart positions	Sales	Album
Title	Year	JPN	Sales	Album
"Butter-Fly"	2015	78	—	Anison Kamikyoku + ChainChro
"Sakura" (桜)	2016	82	—	Final Project
"—" denotes releases that did not chart or were not released in that region.
