= Michihiko Ohta =

Japanese singer, composer and arranger

Michihiko Ohta 太田 美知彦
- Occupations: Composer, arranger

Michihiko Ohta (太田 美知彦, Ōta Michihiko; November 23, 1964) is a Japanese singer, composer, and arranger who has worked for several anime series such as Bubblegum Crash, Captain Tsubasa J, and Digimon.

== Career ==
In the Digimon series, Ohta wrote three of the four opening themes: "Target ~Akai Shougeki~", "The Biggest Dreamer" and "FIRE!!" (all sung by Kouji Wada) - almost every Evolution theme - "brave heart", "Break Up!" (sung by Ayumi Miyazaki), "SLASH!!" (sung by himself) and others - several Image themes and other Digimon related songs. He also wrote and arranged some of the tracks on Kouji Wada's album All of My Mind.

Ohta wrote an insert song for the fifth Digimon series, Digimon Savers. The track, titled "Believer" and sung by Ikuo of Prince of Tennis fame, is used as the series evolution theme, and was released on June 28, 2006.
