= Butter-Fly =

1999 single by Kōji Wada

- Cover of the original 1999 single

Single by Kōji Wada

from the album All of My Mind
- B-side: "Seven"; "Seven" (10th Memorial Version; Strong Version)
- Released: April 23, 1999
- Genre: J-pop, anison
- Length: 4:14; 18:14 (Strong version)
- Label: Interchannel
- Songwriters: Hidenori Chiwata; Cher Watanabe

Kōji Wada singles chronology
"Butter-Fly" (1999)	"Target (Akai Shōgeki)" (2000)
"Hirari" (2007)	"Butter-Fly (Strong Version)" (2009)	"We Are Xros Heart!" (2010)
"Evolution & DigiXros" (2011)	"Butter-Fly (tri. Version)" (2015)	"Seven (tri. Version)" (2016)

"Butter-Fly" is a song recorded by Japanese singer Kōji Wada as the opening theme song to Digimon Adventure. The song was released as Wada's debut single on April 23, 1999.

== Background and release ==
"Butter-Fly" was the theme song to the 1999 film Digimon Adventure, performed as a ballad. "Butter-Fly" was later re-worked as a rock song, and its rock iteration became the opening theme song to the television series of the same name. It had been the first time Wada had performed a rock song.

Originally released on April 23, 1999, the single was re-released on August 1, 2004, with new CD artwork to commemorate Digimon Adventure's 5th anniversary. The success of the song gave Wada the title "Immortal Butterfly Anime Song Singer."

=== Other versions ===
"Butter-Fly (Strong Version)" was released on April 22, 2009, to commemorate the 10th anniversary of the Digimon franchise as well as the 10th anniversary of his debut with the song. It was his first single in three years after "Hirari" and charted on Oricon Weekly Singles for one week.

"Butter-Fly (tri. Version)" was released on November 25, 2015, as the theme song for the Japanese version of the anime film series Digimon Adventure tri., and the single was his last release before his death on April 3, 2016. A second version of "Butter-Fly (tri. Version)" was released as a tribute on May 1, 2018, as the ending theme to Digimon Adventure tri.: Chapter 6: Future, the final installment to the Digimon Adventure tri. film series, as well as the final part of the film. The song was performed by AiM, Ayumi Miyazaki, and the eighteen main cast members of tri., along with posthumous archive audio of Wada.

== Reception ==
"Butter-Fly" was ranked number 5 on NHK's list of Top 100 Best Anime Songs in 2017.

== Cover versions ==
The cast for the male characters in Digimon Adventure performed "Butter-Fly" and released it with the We Love Digimon Music CD box on December 25, 2002. The release was to commemorate the franchise's 100th CD release.

The song has also been covered by Masaaki Endoh in his album Enson.

Halko Momoi covered "Butter-Fly" on her 2008 cover album More & More Quality Red: Anime Song Cover.

Nagareda Project released a cover version on their album, Nagareda PPP, on August 8, 2012.

Idol group Sea*A released an English version of "Butter-Fly" on their eponymous debut album, Sea*A, on March 27, 2013.

Idol group Trefle performed a cover version of "Butter-Fly" and released it as their debut single on November 18, 2015, which charted at #78 on the Oricon Weekly Singles Chart. The song served as the opening theme song to the show Animemashite. They performed the song at Anison History Japan!!.

On September 2, 2019, Vocaloid Hatsune Miku released a cover, as part of a collaboration event with the Digimon franchise.

On August 15, 2025, YouTube channel The First Take released a cover by a unit named ANISAMA FRIENDS, composed of artists Masayoshi Ōishi, Masami Okui, as well as bands angela, TrySail and FLOW (selected for their importance in Animelo Summer Live).

== Track listing ==
All songs arranged by Cher Watanabe.

=== 1999 and 2004 versions ===
No.	Title	Writer(s)	Length
1.	"Butter-Fly"	Hidenori Chiwata	4:18
2.	"Seven"	Kouhei Koyama	4:17
3.	"Butter-Fly" (original karaoke)		4:18
4.	"Seven" (original karaoke)		4:17
Total length:			17:12

=== Strong version ===
"Butter-Fly (Strong Version)" single
No.	Title	Writer(s)	Length
1.	"Butter-Fly" (Strong Version)	Hidenori Chiwata	4:30
2.	"Seven" (10th Memorial Version)	Kouhei Koyama	4:37
3.	"Butter-Fly" (Strong Version; original karaoke)		4:30
4.	"Seven" (10th Memorial Version; original karaoke)		4:37
Total length:			18:13

=== tri. version ===
"Butter-Fly (tri. Version)" single
No.	Title	Writer(s)	Length
1.	"Butter-Fly" (tri. Version)	Hidenori Chiwata	3:45
2.	"Butter-Fly" (tri. Version; original karaoke)		3:45
Total length:			7:30

== Charts ==
=== 1999 version ===
Chart	Peak position
Billboard Japan Hot 100	39
Billboard Japan Hot Animation	8
Oricon Weekly Singles Chart	47

=== Strong Version ===
Chart	Peak position
Oricon Weekly Singles Chart	143

=== tri. Version ===
Chart	Peak position
Oricon Weekly Singles Chart	35
