= Yukari Goto =

- 後藤 友香里
- Born: January 14, 1988 (age 38); Tokyo, Japan
- Other name: Dancing Yukari
- Occupations: Singer; Voice actress; gravure model; television personality
- Years active: 2005-2017
- Musical career
- Genres: J-pop; anison
- Instrument: Vocals

Yukari Goto (後藤 友香里, Gotō Yukari; born January 14, 1988) is a former Japanese singer, voice actress, gravure model, and television personality. She debuted in 2005 as a member of the co-ed group AAA before leaving in 2007. She is also a former member of the groups Trefle and Emergency. In 2017, she retired from entertainment.

== Career ==
Goto was added as a member to the co-ed group AAA and debuted with them in 2005. She left the group on June 11, 2007, citing health problems. In 2009, Goto re-emerged as a gravure idol with the release of her first DVD, Revive. In 2011, she became the host of the online show Raibubu.

In 2013, Goto joined the girl group Trefle and was active on their online radio program, A&G Girls Project Trefle. In the same year, Goto also joined the group Emergency with Masaya Onosaka and Yū Kobayashi under the name Dancing Yukari.

On July 29, 2016, Trefle announced that they would disband after their final concert on October 5, 2016. On January 19, 2017, Goto announced that she was leaving Emergency and was retiring from entertainment.

== Filmography ==
=== Television ===
Year	Title	Role	Notes
2006	Lemon Angel Project	Yuki Kawanabe	Voice
2013	Tanken Driland: 1000-nen no Mahō	Cosmos	Voice
2014	Cardfight!! Vanguard G	Female announcer	Voice
2016	Mr. Nietzsche in the Convenience Store	Female guest	

=== Video game ===
Year	Title	Role	Notes
2015	Assault Suit Leynos	Mina Charlotte Alexia	PlayStation 4 re-release

=== Solo DVDs ===
List of solo DVDs, with selected chart positions, sales figures and certifications
Title	Year	Details	Peak chart positions	Sales
Title	Year	Details	JPN	Sales
Revive	2009	Released: June 25, 2009; Label: Saibunkan Shuppan; Formats: DVD	—	—
"—" denotes releases that did not chart or were not released in that region.
