= All of My Mind =

Studio album by Kōji Wada
- Released: December 5, 2001
- Genres: J-pop, rock
- Length: 54:20
- Label: King Records
- Producer: Cher Watanabe

Kōji Wada chronology
All of My Mind (2001)	The Best Selection~Welcome Back! (2007)

All of My Mind is the first album of Japanese singer Kōji Wada. The album was released on December 5, 2001, through King Records.

== Track listing ==
All lyrics are written by Kōji Wada.

No.	Title	Music	Arranger(s)	Length
1.	"Starting Over"	Kōji Wada, Hidenori Chiwata	Makoto Takō	4:27
2.	"Butter-Fly"	Hidenori Chwata	Cher Watanabe	4:14
3.	"Wind (風 Kaze)"	Kōji Wada, Kaoru Ōkubo, Hiroshi Yamada	Cher Watanabe	3:54
4.	"Smile (笑顔 Egao)"	Kōji Wada, Michihiko Ohta	Michihiko Ohta	5:14
5.	"Seven"	Kōhei Koyama	Cher Watanabe	4:13
6.	"Target (Red Crash) (ターゲット～赤い衝撃～ Tāgetto~Akai Shōgeki~)"	Yū Matsuki, Michihiko Ohta	Michihiko Ohta	4:26
7.	"Remaining a Girl (少女のままで Shōjo no Mama De)"	Kōji Wada, Michihiko Ohta	Michihiko Ohta	4:27
8.	"Because I'm Me (僕は僕だって Boku wa Boku Datte)"	Yū Matsuki, Michihiko Ohta	Cher Watanabe	4:13
9.	"Say Again"	Kōji Wada, Michihiko Ohta	Michihiko Ohta	4:21
10.	"The Future of Your Color (Dream) (君色の未来 (ゆめ) Kimi-iro no Mirai (Yume))"	Kōji Wada, Cher Watanabe	Cher Watanabe	4:18
11.	"The Biggest Dreamer"	Hiroshi Yamada, Michihiko Ohta	Michihiko Ohta	3:51
12.	"Modern Love"	halta, Makoto Takō	Makoto Takō	6:20
