= Twill (band) =

Japanese musical duo

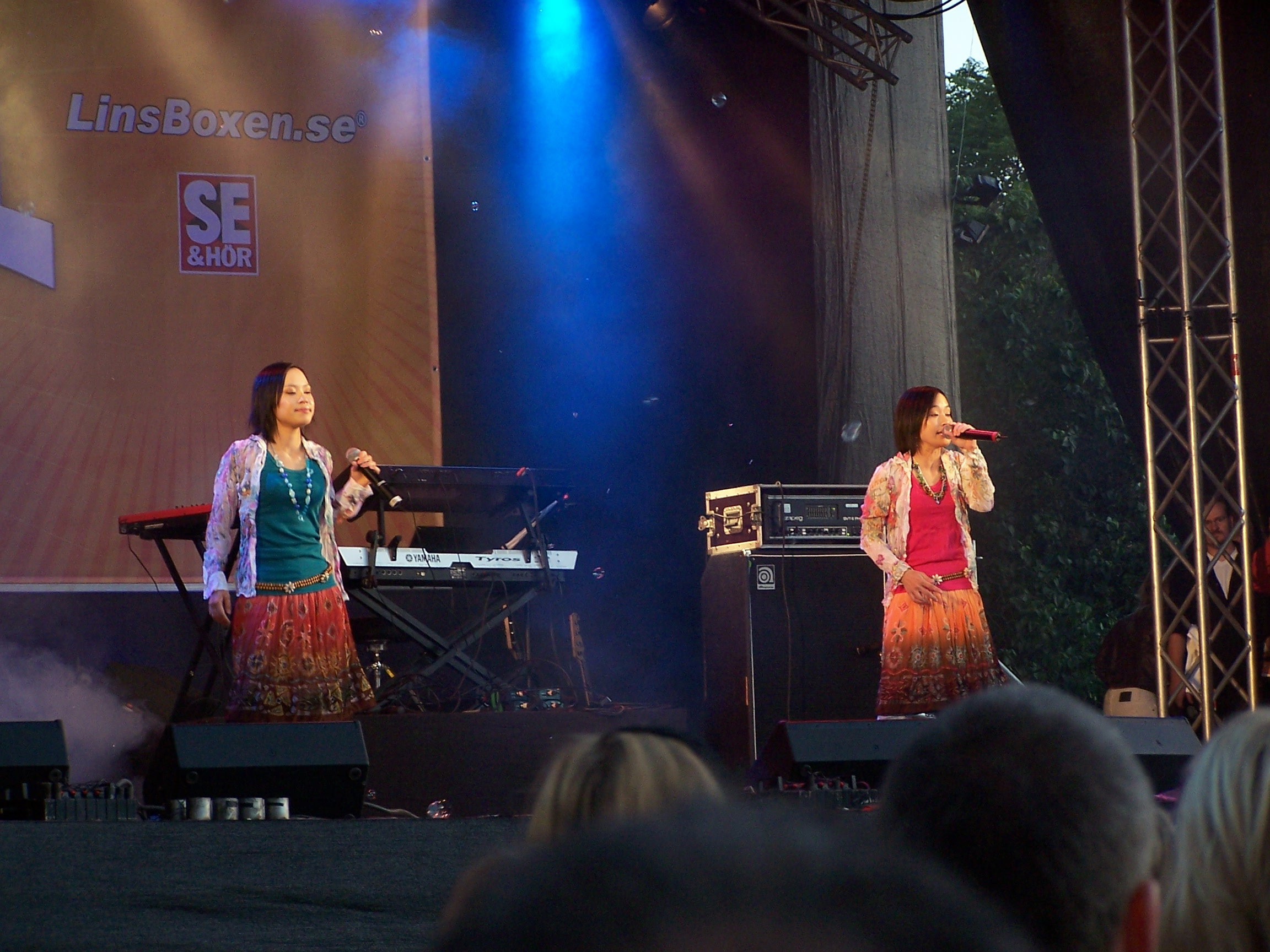
- Michiko and Yoko performing in Sweden (2005)

Background information
- Origin: Fukuoka Prefecture, Japan
- Genres: J-pop; R&B
- Years active: 2004–2009 (international); 2001–2004, 2009–present (Japan)
- Labels: Zomba Group of Companies (2001 – 2004); Bonnier Amigo Music Group (2004 – 2009); Nayutawave (2009-2012); Tokuma Japan Communications (2012 - Present)
- Members: Michiko; Yoko
- Website: Twill official site

Twill (トゥワイル, Tuwairu) is a Japanese duo composed of twins Michiko and Yoko (surname unknown). Their stage name is a portmanteau of English language words "twin" and "will". They are managed by TV Asahi Music.

They are also known in United States and Sweden. Two of their singles "New World" and "STAND UP" are used as opening themes for the Digimon Xros Wars anime series.

== Profile ==
- Michiko (elder sister)
- Yoko (younger sister)

Both were born on 14 November 1985. They were raised in Fukuoka, Japan.

== History ==
2001 - Signed with Zomba Records Japan

2002 - Released first single Before I Fall

2004 - Signed with BAMG

2009 - Went back to Japan and signed to UMG - Nayutawave Records

2012 - Left Nayutawave Records and signed up to Tokuma Japan.

== Discography ==
=== International singles ===
- Is It Love?
- One Step at a Time
- Story of My Life (ending theme for Sue Thomas: F.B.Eye)

All released under Bonnier Amigo

=== Japan singles ===
- Before I Fall (4 December 2002 - Zomba Japan)
- Love Friend (22 July 2009 - Nayutawave)
- My Step (30 September 2009 - Nayutawave)
- Close to You (5 May 2010 - Nayutawave)
- New World - "Digimon Xros Wars: The Evil Death General and the Seven Kingdoms" Opening Theme (8 June 2011 - Nayutawave)
- Stand Up - "Digimon Xros Wars: Time Traveling Hunter Boys" Opening Theme (7 March 2012 - Tokuma Japan Communications)
