= Digimon Fusion season 1 =

Digimon Fusion
- Season 1
- No. of episodes: 30

Release
- Original network: TV Asahi
- Original release: July 6, 2010 – March 8, 2011

Season chronology
- ← Previous; Digimon Data Squad Next → Digimon Fusion (season 2)

Digimon Fusion, known in Japan as Digimon Xros Wars (デジモンクロスウォーズ, Dejimon Kurosu Wōzu), is the sixth series of the anime series of the Digimon franchise, produced by Toei Animation. It aired in Japan on TV Asahi on July 6, 2010. Nickelodeon aired the series in the United States on September 7, 2013. Nicktoons aired the series on October 13, 2013, with a marathon of the first four episodes. Nickelodeon soon shifted the series to the sister network known as Nicktoons. The CW's Vortexx aired the series on January 25, 2014. It ran all 30 episodes of season 1 before leaving The CW on September 27, 2014, of that year following Vortexx's discontinuation. It is the only series in the franchise that has more than one season.

The opening theme for the first part is Sonar Pocket's "Never Give Up!" (ネバギバ!, Nebagiba!). The series also features original music by Kousuke Yamashita as well as various insert songs sung by Kōji Wada.

== Episodes ==
No.	English Title/Original Japanese title	Directed by	Written by	Original release date	American air date
1	"Mikey Goes to Another World!" ("Taiki, Go to Another World!"); Transliteration: "Taiki, Isekai e Yuku!" (Japanese: タイキ、異世界へ行く！)	Tetsuya Endō	Riku Sanjō	July 6, 2010	September 7, 2013
Mikey, a teenager, has a dream about leading a Digimon army. The next day, he faces some personal challenges with his friends Angie and Jeremy. However, things take a strange turn when Mikey encounters a dying red creature. He receives a Fusion Loader device from a mysterious voice, using it to save the creature. Suddenly, they are all transported to the Digital World. There, they are surrounded by hostile Digimon led by MadLeomon. They are saved by Shoutmon, the red creature, who wants to become the Digimon King. Together with Shoutmon and his companions, they face off against MadLeomon and his troops, leading to a battle in which they ultimately defeat MadLeomon. As a portal appears, they realize they're trapped in the Digital World, and Mikey, Angie, and Jeremy decide to assist Shoutmon and his friends.
2	"He is Shoutmon, Hear Him Roar!" ("Shoutmon, Roar!"); Transliteration: "Shautomon, Hoeru!" (Japanese: シャウ卜モン、吠える！)	Yukio Kaizawa	Riku Sanjō	July 13, 2010	September 14, 2013
More humans with Fusion Loaders join the fight against MadLeomon's forces. Mikey and his friends arrive at the Village of Light, learn about the Bagra Army, and fend off an attack by Pteramon. Angie encounters Cutemon and Dorulumon, sparking thoughts of returning to the human world. Shoutmon tries to persuade Mikey to stay by throwing a party but ends up causing a rift. Mikey decides to leave with Angie and Jeremy. When MadLeomon attacks, Shoutmon, Ballistamon, Starmon, and the Pickmonz come to their rescue. MadLeomon absorbs Orochimon, becoming MadLeomon Orochi Mode, but Mikey and Shoutmon reconcile and defeat him, forcing him to flee.
3	"A Rival Appears" ("Rival Kiriha, Appear!"); Transliteration: "Raibaru Kiriha, Arawaru!" (Japanese: 強敵キリハ、現る！)	Hiroyuki Kakudō	Riku Sanjō	July 20, 2010	October 5, 2013
Mikey, Angie, and Jeremy discover a disturbance in the Forest Zone as bamboo shoots rise around the Village of Light. They encounter a mysterious boy named Christopher, who wants Mikey to join his Blue Flare Army. However, their focus shifts to battling MadLeomon and his army of Apemon and Pteramon. Mikey refuses to join Christopher, leading to a battle in which MadLeomon absorbs the Apemon to become MadLeomon Final Mode. Despite their initial struggles, the Fusion Fighters, aided by Cutemon and Dorulumon, defeat MadLeomon. During the battle, Mikey recalls his dream, and they discover a Code Crown, meeting the mysterious girl Nene Amano.
4	"Island Zone in Chaos!" ("Island Zone, Upheaval!"); Transliteration: "Airando Zōn, Gekidō!" (Japanese: アイランドゾーン、激動！)	Masahiro Hosoda	Reiko Yoshida	July 27, 2010	October 13, 2013
Nene Amano introduces herself and explains that the Digital World is divided into Zones, each with its own Code Crown fragment. Collecting all the fragments would grant control over the Digital World. Mikey, Angie, and Jeremy, with Nene's guidance, arrive at the Island Zone. There, they save Archelomon from Gizamon searching for the Code Crown. Archelomon mentions the Code Crown is in a difficult-to-reach location and asks for Digibites for an upcoming festival.Meanwhile, the Bagra Army's commander Neptunemon learns about the Fusion Fighters' presence and sends a fleet of Mantaraymon and Divermon to stop them. To infiltrate the fleet, the Fusion Fighters go underwater. Neptunemon's forces attempt to sink the hijacked Mantaraymon and drown its occupants, but Shoutmon ×2 Plus M, formed with the help of ChibiTortomon, turns the tide. However, ChibiTortomon's bravery leads to Archelomon's capture by Neptunemon
5	"Thanks for the DigiCards!" ("Digimemory, Shine!"); Transliteration: "Dejimemori, Kagayaku!" (Japanese: デジメモリ、輝く！)	Hiroki Shibata	Reiko Yoshida	August 3, 2010	October 20, 2013
Neptunemon discovers the location of the Code Crown from Archelomon. Mikey, Angie, and Jeremy encounter Flymon on their quest for the Code Crown and face a unique guardian, KingWhamon, who is the island itself. When the Flymon attempt to steal the Code Crown and harm Shoutmon, Mikey and Shoutmon end up inside KingWhamon. With KingWhamon's help and a cure for Shoutmon, they obtain the Code Crown. Upon leaving KingWhamon, they are attacked by Neptunemon's Ebidramon. The battle proves challenging for Shoutmon ×2, leading them to seek the assistance of legendary Digimon data stored in DigiCards. Leviamon and Shoutmon ×2 work together to defeat Ebidramon. However, their victory is short-lived as Neptunemon sends an army of Seadramon to confront the Fusion Fighters in an attempt to take the Code Crown.
6	"Crisis or Conquest" ("X4, Crisis Breakthrough!"); Transliteration: "Kurosu Fō, Kiki Toppa!" (Japanese: ×4, 危機突破！)	Toshiaki Komura	Reiko Yoshida	August 10, 2010	October 27, 2013
Neptunemon uses Archelomon as leverage to obtain the Code Crown and DigiCards from the Fusion Fighters. Christopher Aonuma arrives on MailBirdramon and offers to deal with the Seadramon to retrieve the items, but Mikey declines. Instead, Mikey summons a group of MarineAngemon using MarineAngemon's DigiCard to subdue the Seadramon and Neptunemon. With the help of Shoutmon ×2, Jeremy, and a bridge of Syakomon, Mikey reaches Neptunemon and frees Archelomon. However, Neptunemon traps them on the frozen ocean surface. Dorulumon intervenes to rescue the Fusion Fighters and Archelomon. The three Digimon, Shoutmon, Ballistamon, and Dorulumon, DigiFuse into Shoutmon ×4 to face Neptunemon's powerful weapon. Shoutmon ×4 uses Neptunemon as a shield against his own weapon, defeating Neptunemon. KingWhamon saves the Fusion Fighters from the icy waters. Christopher departs, and ChibiTortomon officially joins the Fusion Fighters. Mikey fails to convince Dorulumon to join their team.
7	"Danger Erupts!" ("Volcano Digimon, Explosion!"); Transliteration: "Kazan Dejimon, Daibakuhatsu!" (Japanese: 火山デジモン、大爆発！)	Yutaka Tsuchida	Shōji Yonemura	August 17, 2010	November 3, 2013
The Fusion Fighters visit the Magma Zone and encounter an army of hostile Digimon. SkullMeramon and BlueMeramon lead the attack. Although they manage to defeat the enemy, SkullMeramon proves challenging for Shoutmon ×2. Cutemon, who is traveling with Dorulumon to find his parents, intervenes, leading to the enemy's retreat. Dorulumon refuses to join the Fusion Fighters, but they find a Digimon enslavement camp where they plan to free captive Digimon. They fall into a trap set by SkullMeramon but are later aided by Dorulumon. They DigiFuse into Shoutmon ×3 to defeat SkullMeramon. The episode ends with their encounter with AncientVolcanomon, a high-ranking Bagra Army officer.
8	"Meltdown in the Magma Zone!" ("Fierce General Tactimon, Close In!"); Transliteration: "Mōshō Takutimon, Semaru!" (Japanese: 猛将タクティモン、迫る！)	Kōhei Kureta	Shōji Yonemura	August 24, 2010	November 5, 2013
The Fusion Fighters realize that continuing their battle with AncientVolcanomon could lead to the cave's collapse and harm the prisoners. They decide to surrender and give AncientVolcanomon a fake Fusion Loader to gain access to the prisoners' cell. Mikey, Cutemon, and Dorulumon encourage the prisoners and start digging a way out. AncientVolcanomon discovers the fake Fusion Loader and sends SkullMeramon with an army of RedMeramon to recapture them. Shoutmon ×2 defeats SkullMeramon's group, but they face a tough challenge against AncientVolcanomon. Mikey instructs Shoutmon ×4 to plug the volcano on AncientVolcanomon's back, causing magma buildup and defeating him. As the sun rises, they encounter Tactimon, one of the Bagra Army's three generals. Tactimon reveals that Dorulumon was once part of the Bagra Army, serving as his right-hand man.
9	"Dorulumon's True Colors!" ("Dorulumon, Run Like the Wind!"); Transliteration: "Dorurumon, Kaze ni Kakeru!" (Japanese: ドルルモン、風に駆ける！)	Hiroyuki Kakudō	Shōji Yonemura	August 31, 2010	November 10, 2013
Tactimon separates Mikey and Dorulumon from the group, but Christopher's arrival creates a distraction. Angie and Jeremy free Mikey and Dorulumon with BlueMeramon's help. Dorulumon explains his past and why he left the Bagra Army. The group retrieves Mikey's Fusion Loader, and BlueMeramon sacrifices himself to save Dorulumon. They confront AncientVolcanomon and defeat Fused AncientVolcanomon with Dorulumon and Shoutmon ×3. Dorulumon decides to join the Fusion Fighters, and they obtain the Magma Zone's Code Crown before heading to the next zone.
10	"The Rival Champions!" ("Taiki, Become a Knight!"); Transliteration: "Taiki, Kishi ni Naru!" (Japanese: タイキ、騎士になる！)	Masato Mitsuka	Riku Sanjō	September 14, 2010	November 17, 2013
The Fusion Fighters arrive in the Lake Zone and help the local Digimon fend off an attack by the Bagra Army, led by IceDevimon. They meet Beastmon, the princess of the Lake Zone, who introduces them to Christopher Aonuma. Mikey becomes suspicious of Christopher but later realizes they need his help when the Bagra Army launches a distraction to kidnap Beastmon. During the battle, Christopher reveals his strength, and they manage to repel the attackers. Beastmon names Mikey her champion, and Christopher departs. Laylamon opens a gate to reveal a massive Digimon.
11	"Ice to See You, Angie!" ("Xros Heart, Burn!"); Transliteration: "Kurosu Hāto, Moeru!" (Japanese: クロスハート、燃える！)	Yukio Kaizawa	Riku Sanjō	September 14, 2010	November 24, 2013
Angie begins to doubt her role within the Fusion Fighters as she watches Mikey unconscious. Laylamon uses her powers to control Angie and tricks her into stealing the Code Crown from Beastmon. However, with the help of her friends, Angie breaks free from Laylamon's influence. Furious, Laylamon fuses IceDevimon and Daipenmon into a powerful Digimon, but the Fusion Fighters unite to defeat it. After the battle, Beastmon, Knightmon, and the PawnChessmon join the Fusion Fighters, and Nene Amano offers an alliance with Christopher Aonuma, revealing her black Fusion Loader and partner Digimon, Sparrowmon.
12	"Treasure, Traps and Trouble – Oh My!" ("Sand Zone, A Great Adventure in the Ruins!"); Transliteration: "Sando Zōn, Iseki de Daibōuken!" (Japanese: サンドゾーン、遺跡で大冒険！)	Tetsuya Endō	Shōji Yonemura	October 12, 2010	December 1, 2013
Mikey, Angie, and Jeremy travel to the Sand Zone, where they learn about the fractured Digital World Zones and the treasures within them. They encounter Blastmon, one of the Bagra Army generals, but he is more interested in the treasure than in fighting them. The Fusion Fighters work with Deputymon to reach the treasure and confront Pharaohmon, the ruler of the Sand Zone. However, they discover that Pharaohmon and Deputymon were testing their worth, and a battle is averted. Mikey receives the Sand Zone's Code Crown, while Blastmon faces off against Christopher and his partner Digimon.
13	"Mikey, Warrior of the Light!" ("Taiki, Warrior of the Goddess!"); Transliteration: "Taiki, Megami no Senshi!" (Japanese: タイキ、女神の戦士！)	Masahiro Hosoda	Mitsumi Ito	October 19, 2010	December 8, 2013
Blastmon continues his battle with Cyberdramon and Sparrowmon, while the Fusion Fighters are under fire from Reapmon. Reapmon reluctantly allows Mikey to retrieve his Fusion Loader after seeing a revealing statue. Blastmon eventually leaves the battle, exhausted. Mikey falls into a gorge and encounters Reapmon, who reveals the statue's connection to the Warriors of Light, led by Angemon. Reapmon explains that he was once a member of this order but was forced to kill them when they fell under a spell. He joined the Bagra Army to find the one responsible. As they reach the surface, they discover that several members of their team have fallen under the same spell. Laylamon arrives with her forces, and Reapmon reveals his true intentions to break the spell on the Digimon. In the end, Shoutmon ×4 successfully defeats Ebemon, but Laylamon injures Reapmon before retreating.
14	"Showdown in the Sand Zone" ("The Warrior Beelzebumon, Dances!"); Transliteration: "Senshi Beruzebumon, Mau!" (Japanese: 戦士ベルゼブモン、舞う！)	Yukio Kaizawa; Masato Mitsuka	Hitoshi Tanaka	October 26, 2010	December 15, 2013
Reapmon is fatally wounded by Laylamon, and Mikey is guided by Pharaohmon to use the Sand Zone's Code Crown to raise a protective pyramid. Mikey attempts to heal Reapmon using the power of the Warriors of Light, while Laylamon summons Machinedramon to break the barrier and devour the defeated Fusion Fighter Digimon to upgrade itself. Reapmon convinces Mikey to help his friends, and they form Shoutmon ×4K to face Machinedramon, who then upgrades into HiMachinedramon. Beelzemon, formerly Reapmon, sacrifices himself to save the Fusion Fighters. He is accepted as a Warrior of Light, reincarnates into Beelzemon, and helps defeat HiMachinedramon. Laylamon, in her anger, sends the Fusion Fighters to a perilous Digital Zone.
15	"Trouble in Paradise" ("Heaven Zone, The Trap of Paradise!"); Transliteration: "Hebun Zōn, Rakuen no Wana!" (Japanese: ヘブンゾーン、楽園の罠！)	Hiroki Shibata	Reiko Yoshida	November 9, 2010	December 22, 2013
The Fusion Fighters find themselves in the Sky Zone, a floating city. They are initially captivated by the beautiful surroundings but quickly get into trouble for unintentionally breaking various laws set by SlushAngemon, the zone's president. They meet Lucemon, who explains SlushAngemon's oppressive rule and his intent to become the new president to change the laws. The Fusion Fighters are falsely accused of vandalism and obstruction of justice. While facing execution in an arena, they are saved by Beelzemon, who helps them confront SlushAngemon. A confession from Kyupimon leads to a change of heart among the citizens, and Lucemon becomes the new president, with Shoutmon ×4B defeating SlushAngemon in battle. Shakkoumon observes these events from a distance.
16	"A Dark Cloud Over the Sky Zone" ("The Dark Knight Digimon Arrives!"); Transliteration: "Kurokishi Dejimon, Sanjō!" (Japanese: 黒騎士デジモン、参上！)	Hiroyuki Kakudō	Kenta Ishii	November 16, 2010	February 17, 2014
Lucemon is set to pass his presidency to Lucemon but is revealed to be the electoral administrator overseeing Lucemon's worthiness. Lucemon deceives everyone, revealing his allegiance to Laylamon and unleashes the corruptive Phantom Mist to obtain its Code Crown. He Digivolves into Lucemon Chaos Mode, working with Axeknightmon. Nene and Sparrowmon join them, aiming to absorb the Phantom Mist. Lucemon attacks, injuring Shoutmon. However, the Fusion Fighters unite and defeat Lucemon Chaos Mode with Shoutmon ×4B, obtaining the Sky Zone's Code Crown. Nene gets consumed by the dark energy alongside Lucemon, signifying the dangerous power of the Phantom Mist.
17	"Clash in the Clouds" ("The Miraculous DigiXros! Shoutmon X5 Flies!"); Transliteration: "Kiseki no Dejikurosu! Shautomon Kurosu Faibu Tobu!" (Japanese: 奇跡のデジクロス！シャウトモン×5飛ぶ！)	Yutaka Tsuchida	Daisuke Kihara	November 23, 2010	February 17, 2014
Lucemon becomes Lucemon Shadowlord Mode, trapping Nene in the Blazing Orb Gehanna. Sparrowmon tries to save her. The Fusion Fighters and Beelzemon battle Lucemon Shadowlord Mode, but he absorbs Phantom Mist, growing stronger. Mikey, Angie, and Jeremy plan to defeat him but Sparrowmon initially refuses help. Eventually, they form Shoutmon ×5 to fight Lucemon Shadowlord Mode. They succeed, restoring the Sky Zone to normal. The Fusion Fighters get the Code Crown. Sparrowmon rejoins Nene, and Axeknightmon commends Nene for fulfilling her mission as they prepare for the next zone.
18	"Welcome to the Jungle Zone!" ("Stingmon, the Great Digimon Forest's Hero"); Transliteration: "Sutingumon, Dejimon Dai Mitsurin no Yūsha" (Japanese: スティングモン、デジモン大密林の勇者)	Yōko Ikeda	Riku Sanjō	November 30, 2010	February 23, 2014
The Fusion Fighters fall into the Jungle Zone, with Mikey expressing concern for Nene and Axeknightmon. Angie, Jeremy, Cutemon, and Beelzemon get separated and are attacked by Stingmon but are rescued by Lilamon. They all reach a sacred temple where the Jungle Zone's guardian resides. Meanwhile, Dorulumon, Deputymon, Nene, and Christopher meet and search for the others.The rest of the Fusion Fighters, led by Shoutmon ×2 and supported by Knightmon and the PawnChessmon, are attacked by Kongoumon and his army of MegaKabuterimon, with Tactimon later joining the battle. Dorulumon, Deputymon, and Beelzemon arrive, and Shoutmon ×4B defeats the MegaKabuterimon army, forcing Tactimon to retreat. In the sacred temple, Christopher orders MetalGreymon to attack Stingmon and Lilamon, horrifying Angie, Jeremy, and Cutemon. Nene demands that Christopher extract information from the Digimon, but he refuses. Axeknightmon appears from Nene's Fusion Loader, urging Christopher to reconsider. Mikey and Shoutmon ×4B intervene to prevent MetalGreymon from killing Stingmon, and the guardian Digimon levitates Stingmon into the temple, with Axeknightmon trying to follow.
19	"Rumble in the Jungle Zone!" ("The Legendary Deckerdramon, Moves!"); Transliteration: "Densetsu no Dekkādoramon, Ugoku!" (Japanese: 伝説のデッカードラモン、動く！)	Masato Mitsuka	Riku Sanjō	December 7, 2010	March 2, 2014
Nene and Axeknightmon chase Stingmon into a sacred temple, where Deckerdramon heals him. Mikey and his team, along with Christopher's help, perform a ritual to gain access to the temple. They engage Axeknightmon in battle but learn that Nene is helping him to find her brother. Deckerdramon joins forces with Christopher, granting him the Jungle Zone's Code Crown. After a confrontation with Kongoumon, Nene retreats to the Dust Zone, and Mikey is separated from his team by dark energy.
20	"Train of Terror!" ("Dust Zone, Grand Locomon's Big Scrap City!"); Transliteration: "Dasuto Zōn, Gurandorocomon no Dai Sukurappu Toshi!" (Japanese: ダストゾーン、グランドロコモンの大スクラップ都市！)	Yukio Kaizawa	Shouji Yonemura	December 14, 2010	March 9, 2014
Mikey, Angie, and Jeremy are ambushed and have Mikey's Fusion Loader stolen by Garbagemon and his gang. They find themselves in the Dust Zone, a wasteland ruled by GranLocomon. They meet Puppetmon, a resident of the Dust Zone, who initially helps them recover the Fusion Loader. However, GranLocomon threatens to destroy the Dust Zone, so the Fusion Fighters stop him with Puppetmon's aid. But the peace is short-lived, as Axeknightmon and Christopher, supported by SkullGreymon and SkullSatamon, launch a surprise attack after touching the Blazing Orb.
21	"Disaster in the Dust Zone!" ("Decisive Battle! DarkKnightmon VS Xros Heart!"); Transliteration: "Kessen! Dākunaitomon VS Kurosu Hāto!" (Japanese: 決戦！ダークナイトモンVSクロスハート！)	Hiroyuki Kakudō	Shouji Yonemura	December 21, 2010	March 16, 2014
Mikey, Angie, and Jeremy escape from Axeknightmon and Christopher with Puppetmon's help. Laylamon agrees to an alliance with Axeknightmon, but she plans to betray him. Sparrowmon reveals Nene's true motive for assisting Axeknightmon – to save her younger brother. Mikey's group tries to rescue Nene and teams up with Christopher to battle Axeknightmon and Laylamon's forces. They save Nene and defeat their enemies with Shoutmon ×5. However, Axeknightmon unveils the Darkness Loader and destroys the Dust Zone. Nene joins the Fusion Fighters, and Bagramon personally appears in the Digital World.
22	"Lost in Digital Space" ("Wisemon, the Secrets of the Digital World!"); Transliteration: "Waizumon, Dejitaru Wārudo no Himitsu!" (Japanese: ワイズモン、デジタルワールドの秘密！)	Toshiaki Komura	Riku Sanjō	January 11, 2011	March 23, 2014
Nene's Fusion Loader stops working, and she collapses from exhaustion. Mikey, Angie, and Jeremy decide to take her to the Monitamons' home in the Warrior Zone for help. On their way, they are attacked by the legendary Digimon Arukadhimon, who separates them from their friends and Fusion Loaders. Mikey ends up in digital space and meets Wisemon, who initially plans to dissect him but later decides to help. Mikey learns more about the Digital World and the impending threat of Bagramon collecting all the Code Crowns. Wisemon aids Mikey in rescuing his friends, and they ultimately defeat Arukadhimon. As Laylamon arrives, she is furious to find Arukadhimon defeated. Wisemon joins the Fusion Fighters as they reach the Warrior Zone and are greeted by a clan of Monitamon.
23	"Laughing All the Way to the Code Crown" ("Shinobi Zone, The Comical Ninja Battle!"); Transliteration: "Shinobi Zōn, Owarai Ninja Batoru!" (Japanese: シノビゾーン、お笑い忍者バトル！)	Masahiro Hosoda	Reiko Yoshida	January 18, 2011	March 30, 2014
Nene's Fusion Loader malfunctions, causing her to collapse from exhaustion. Mikey, Angie, and Jeremy decide to seek help in the Warrior Zone, and while en route, they encounter Arukadhimon, a formidable Digimon who separates them from their Fusion Loaders and friends. Mikey ends up in a digital space and encounters Wisemon, who initially has sinister intentions but eventually decides to assist him. Mikey gains insights into the Digital World and the impending threat of Bagramon collecting the Code Crowns. With Wisemon's help, they rescue their friends and defeat Arukadhimon. As Laylamon arrives, she is displeased to find Arukadhimon defeated, and Wisemon joins the Fusion Fighters as they reach the Warrior Zone and are welcomed by a group of Monitamon.
24	"Monitamission Impossible!" ("Dropout Monitamons, Do Your Best!); Transliteration: "Ochikobore Monitamonzu, Ganbaru!" (Japanese: 落ちこぼれモニタモンズ、がんばる！)	Hiroki Shibata	Reiko Yoshida	January 25, 2011	April 6, 2014
Nene's Monitamon report an impending attack by Musyamon's forces on the Monitamon Village to claim the Warrior Zone Code Crown. The Fusion Fighters shift their focus to defend the village instead of rescuing the Monitamon princess. Jeremy, aiming to impress Nene, sneaks into Musyamon's castle with the Rare Star Sword and a group of less-skilled red Monitamon. Nene transforms her Fusion Loader, and her Monitamon allies combine into Hi-Vision Monitamon to defeat Musyamon. Nene offers to join the Fusion Fighters full-time once she finds her younger brother, Ewan Amano. The Monitamon princess, who falls for Jeremy, surprises the team.
25	"Showdown in Shaky Town!" ("Zone Collapses! Sparks Fly Between Taiki and Kiriha!"); Transliteration: "Zōn Hōkai! Hibana Chiru Taiki to Kiriha!" (Japanese: ゾーン崩壊！火花散るタイキとキリハ！)	Yutaka Tsuchida	Riku Sanjō	February 1, 2011	June 1, 2014
Mikey, Angie, and Jeremy find Christopher in the Disc Zone, where he is battling Blastmon. The fight causes the zone to break apart, and Mikey tries to stop it with Shoutmon ×4K. However, they end up separated from Shoutmon, Greymon, and MailBirdramon. Shoutmon reflects on his inability to maintain the DigiFused state. Christopher reveals his desire to create a world for strong Digimon and shows no concern for his lost allies. Mikey persuades Christopher to let him handle the fight, and Shoutmon ×4K defeats Bulbmon with Greymon's unexpected help. The Disc Zone starts to collapse, and despite Mikey's plea for coexistence, Christopher leaves them stranded as the zone disintegrates.
26	"Shoutmon – Bogus King or the Real Thing?" ("Shoutmon, Proof of a King!"); Transliteration: "Shautomon, Kingu no Akashi!" (Japanese: シャウトモン、キングの証！)	Hiroyuki Kakudō	Riku Sanjō	February 8, 2011	June 1, 2014
Mikey realizes the Disc Zone is beyond saving and quickly transfers all Digimon to the Warrior Zone. Shoutmon befriends a Disc Zone resident named Lunamon but begins to doubt his abilities. Wisemon reveals that Blastmon's fragments formed a replica. With Beelzemon's help, Shoutmon ×4 destroys the replica, and the Monitamon prevent new replicas from forming. Mikey notices Shoutmon's strange behavior and learns he's been receiving training to get stronger. A mysterious Digimon helps Shoutmon as they prepare to fight Blastmon, and Nene arrives to DigiFuse with Sparrowmon, creating Shoutmon ×5B to defeat Blastmon. Meanwhile, Mikey hears a dying Digimon's melody, and Blastmon's remains are chastised by Tactimon. A mysterious Digimon, Tuwarmon, is revealed as Axeknightmon's spy within the Bagra Army, using the guise of Damemon.
27	"Sweet Zone Bake-Off!" ("Sweets Zone, Sweet Tooth Digimon Battle"); Transliteration: "Suītsu Zōn, Amatō Dejimon Batoru" (Japanese: スイーツゾーン, 甘党デジモンバトル)	Masato Mitsuka	Shouji Yonemura	February 15, 2011	June 8, 2014
Mikey and the Fusion Fighters rescue Spadamon, who informs them about the Sweet Zone being controlled by the Bagra Army's Matadormon. Angie pretends to be an expert pastry chef to gain access to Matadormon, who only appears before chefs. While Nene and the Monitamon rescue imprisoned chefs, Angie enters an Iron Chef contest against the top Digimon chef, WaruMonzaemon, Matadormon's private chef. The loser is sent to the dungeon, and despite Angie's doubts about baking, the Fusion Fighters help her create a sweet potato cake. Matadormon is pleased with the cake's unusual taste. When Nene frees the chefs, they reveal themselves to Matadormon and WaruMonzaemon. WaruMonzaemon absorbs the Monzaemon and becomes GigaWaruMonzaemon, overpowering Shoutmon ×4. Spadamon DigiFuses with Shoutmon ×4S and helps defeat GigaWaruMonzaemon. Cutemon learns that his parents and other Sweet Zone residents are in the underground. Matadormon's attack sends the Fusion Fighters tumbling into the underground
28	"Battle in the Digital Depths" ("The Ultimate Weapon Active! Hang in there Cutemon!"); Transliteration: "Saishū Heiki Hatsudō! Ganbare Kyūtomon!" (Japanese: 最終兵器発動！がんばれキュートモン！)	Yukio Kaizawa	Shouji Yonemura	February 22, 2011	June 8, 2014
Mikey, Angie, Jeremy, and Nene are in the Sweets Zone's underground, searching for Cutemon's parents and the Sweet Zone residents. They encounter Raremon, who are transformed prisoners. After a daring escape from Raremon, they discover that the prisoners' data is being transferred into Breakdramon, a legendary Digimon. Shoutmon ×5 battles Breakdramon, but Matadormon appears, revealing that Cutemon's parents are hostages. Matadormon uses their power to restore Breakdramon and attempts to defeat Shoutmon ×5. However, Cutemon's parents send a telepathic plea for help, inspiring Cutemon to heal Shoutmon ×5. Mikey and Spadamon save Cutemon's parents, and Shoutmon ×5 defeats Matadormon, restoring the Sweet Zone residents. The Fusion Fighters obtain the Sweet Zone's Code Crown, and Cutemon decides to continue traveling with them.
29	"Fall of the Final Code Crown" ("Taiki & Kiriha VS the Bagra Army, a Complete Showdown!"); Transliteration: "Taiki Kiriha VS Bagura Gun, Zenmen Kessen!" (Japanese: タイキ・キリハVSバグラ軍、全面決戦！)	Masahiro Hosoda	Riku Sanjō	March 1, 2011	June 15, 2014
Mikey, Angie, Jeremy, and Nene arrive in the Sword Zone, where they find Grademon attacking. Mikey eventually obtains the Sword Zone Code Crown, and Grademon turns good, leaving to seek a rematch with Jeremy. Meanwhile, Christopher informs Mikey that all the Code Crowns have been found, signaling an impending war for control of the Digital World. Tactimon appears and tries to take their Code Crowns, using his Sword of Storms to overpower them. However, Grademon returns, sacrificing himself to help the Fusion Fighters and Blue Flare teams escape from Tactimon. Bagramon arrives and absorbs all the Code Crowns, becoming the Digital World's ruler and revealing himself as Axeknightmon's older brother. With Mikey, Angie, and Jeremy sent back to the Human World, Bagramon and Axeknightmon plan to reshape the Digital World.
30	"When Worlds Collide" ("Brand New Journey!! Tokyo Showdown!!"); Transliteration: "Arata Naru Tabidachi!! Tōkyō Daikessen!" (Japanese: 新たなる旅立ち！！東京大決戦！！)	Masato Mitsuka	Riku Sanjō	March 8, 2011	June 15, 2014
Mikey Kudo, Angie Hinomoto, and Jeremy Tsurgi are forced by Bagramon to return to the Human World. Shoutmon is invisible to all the humans except to Mikey, Angie, and Jeremy. Mikey, Angie, and Jeremy learn that all the time spent in the Digital World was about half a day in the human world with no other human believing in them. Mikey later hears the voice who had granted him the red Fusion Loader. Mikey is unable to find the voice. The next day, Mikey meets up with Angie and Jeremy. Mikey tells Angie and Jeremy of his intention to go back to the Digital World to save their friends over there. The voice eventually responds to Mikey's words. Mikey follows the voice to the alley where he and his friends first entered the Digital World. The voice is revealed as the DigiCard of Omnimon. After fully materializing Shoutmon and explaining the origin of the DigiCards, Omnimon reveals he can use what power he has remaining to return Mikey and Shoutmon to the Digital World. Angie and Jeremy must stay behind in the human world. Tactimon is trapped in the human world. Tactimon attacks the city as he uses the electricity to enlarge himself while fully bio emerging. Tactimon proceeds to chase after Mikey. Tactimon defeats the Darkdramon DigiCard before taking Angie and Jeremy hostage to force Mikey to hand over the red Fusion Loader. Angie and Jeremy's passionate emotions become energy that enters Mikey's Fusion Loader. This allows Shoutmon to Digivolve into OmniShoutmon. OmniShoutmon manages to destroy Tactimon. Mikey and Shoutmon return to the Digital World. Angie and Jeremy hold on to the powerless Omnimon DigiCard. Angie and Jeremy promise Mikey to join his team in the Digital World once they find a way back to the Digital World. At the Bagra Army's reformatted base named Bagra Pandemonium, Nene Amano's younger brother named Ewan Amano learns of Mikey's return to the Digital World. Ewan expresses joy to Axeknightmon that he will finally get to fight Mikey.
