= Kōji Wada =

Japanese singer (1974–2016)

Kōji Wada 和田 光司

Background information
- Born: January 29, 1974; Fukuchiyama, Kyoto, Japan
- Died: April 3, 2016 (aged 42) Tokyo, Japan
- Genres: J-pop; anime song; rock
- Occupation: Singer
- Instrument: Vocals
- Years active: 1999–2016
- Label: Lantis
- Website: www.wadakoji.com

Kōji Wada (和田 光司, Wada Kōji; January 29, 1974 – April 3, 2016) was a Japanese pop singer. He was best known for performing theme songs for several installments of the Digimon anime television series, including his recording debut in 1999 with his first and most famous single, "Butter-Fly", the theme song of the anime Digimon Adventure. He was signed with the Lantis recording label. His nickname is "Immortal Butterfly Anisong Singer" (不死蝶のアニソンシンガー).

== Life and career ==
Wada was born in Fukuchiyama, Kyoto, Japan. In 2003, Wada released his first original album, All of My Mind, which included many of his previous works. He also collaborated in Michihiko Ōta's self-cover album Mirai e no Message: Ōta Michihiko Self-Cover, featuring in two tracks – a cover version of "Hontō no Tsuyosa" (本当の強さ) (Ken & Wormmon's Theme) and in "3 Primary Colors" (the Tamers theme), along with AiM. Later, he released an album called The Best Selection: Welcome Back!. It contains several of his earlier works as well as two new songs, titled "Pierce" and "Kimi no Keshiki." On August 1, 2008, he debuted a mini-album titled Ever, which contained five brand new songs. An album titled Kazakami no Oka Kara (風上の丘から), was sold at his live concerts in Japan throughout the end of 2009 in commemoration of his 10th anniversary in music, and it was released worldwide on January 11, 2010.

Wada had contributed songs to six of the seven Digimon anime series (with one of his songs reused for the seventh, to which he contributed no new songs), including opening themes for the first five of them. He also performed two songs used as ending themes for Digimon Frontier, "Innocent: Mujaki na Mama de" (イノセント～無邪気なままで～) and "an Endless Tale" (with AiM). He starred in various other songs for the series, such as "Bokura no Digital World" (the "memorial" theme for the Adventure series), "Yūki o Uketsugu Kodomo-tachi e" and also several Christmas songs. He also performed the theme song for Transformers: Robots in Disguise.

=== International appearances ===
In July 2007, Wada made his first show in Brazil, doing a solo presentation and singing along other invited Japanese singers at the "Anime Friends" convention. This happened one year after Ayumi Miyazaki visited Brazil in another convention "ExpoAnime Brasil". He also visited the Brazilian state of Rio Grande do Sul on October 14, 2007, during the Anima Weekend event. On December 15–16, 2007, he made a live presentation in the "Anime Festival XL" event in Santiago, Chile. In August 2008, he released a mini-album named ever, which contains five original songs, with four of them composed and written by himself. In December 2008 he was performing in the "Animeku 08", in February the "AniCon", and in July the "Anime Friends" (both in 2010) Events from "Yamato", in Brazil and Argentina. On June 5–6, 2010, he did two concerts in Monterrey, Mexico in the Santa Lucia Arena at the "Dengeki Live", a J-pop event and anime convention. In response to his metastasized cancer in 2011, he cancelled two appearances planned for Chile and Peru.

== Death ==
On October 4, 2011, Wada announced via his blog that he was putting his career on hold to deal with a sudden metastasized cancer, which was previously treated in 2003.

On April 3, 2016, Wada died suddenly from complications related to nasopharynx cancer. His last single, "Seven〜tri. Version〜", was released five days prior to his death.

=== Tribute ===
A CD tribute for Kōji Wada was released in Japan on July 31, 2016, under the name of "Digimon Song Best of Koji Wada". The CD includes a total of eleven tracks by him. Additionally, the cover features Angemon, Wada's favourite Digimon character. Another compilation, "Koji Wada Digimon Memorial Best", was released on January 25, 2017.

The butterfly-like Digimon Hudiemon and the hacker group Hudie, who appear in the 2017 video game Digimon Story: Cyber Sleuth – Hacker's Memory, were created in tribute to Wada, with Hudie being Chinese for "butterfly".

== Discography ==
=== All of My Mind ===
- Starting Over
- Butter-Fly (April 23, 1999) (Digimon Adventure)
- Seven (April 23, 1999)
- Target: Akai Shōgeki (ターゲット～赤い衝撃～) (Target ~Red Crash~) (April 26, 2000) (Digimon Adventure 02)
- The Biggest Dreamer (April 2, 2001) (Digimon Tamers)
- Kaze (風)
- Egao (笑顔)
- Boku wa Boku Datte (僕は僕だって) (c/w "Target ~Akai Shōgeki~")
- Modern Love
- Kimi-iro no Mirai -Yume- (君色の未来-ゆめ-) (c/w Honō no Overdrive)
- Kimi no Keshiki

=== Kazakami no Oka Kara ===
- billow
- Hikari Sasu Basho e (光り射す場所へ) (Towards the Place Where Light Shines)
- Ai no Kishi (愛の騎士) (Knight of Love)
- Dai・Jou・Bu (ダイ・ジョウ・ブ☆) (It's Alright)
- cogito, ergo sum ~Aishuu~ (cogito.ergo sum ~哀愁~) ( I Think, Therefore, I am ~Sorrow~)
- cogito, ergo sum (I Think, Therefore, I am)
- Kimi ga Ita Kara (君がいたから) (Because You Were Here)
- Anata no Soba de (あなたの傍で) (By Your Side)
- Kakusei (覚醒) (Awakening)
- Natsu no Kaze ni Hukarete (夏の風に吹かれて) (Blowing In the Summer Wind)
- Sem Barreiras: Kegarenaki Jidai e ( SEM BARREIRAS ~汚れなき時代へ~) (Without Barriers: Towards an Era Without Dishonor) (with Ricardo Cruz)
- Always
- Eien no Takaramono II (永遠の宝物 II) (Eternal Treasure II)
- Kazakami no Oka Kara (風上の丘から) (From the Windward Hill)

=== Other songs ===
- Butter-Fly (strong version)
- Eien no Takaramono (永遠の宝物) (Eternal Treasure) (September 2006)
- Grace
- Pierce
- Shōjo no mama de (少女のままで) (Remaining a Girl)
- Starting Over / Say Again (November 7, 2001)
- bravery (August 1, 2008)
- sketch (August 1, 2008)
- Hanabi Jack (ハナビジャック) (August 1, 2008) (Fireworks Jack)
- Kami Hikōki (紙飛コウキ) (August 1, 2008) (Paper Airplane)
- Kimi to Kisetsu to Hidamari to (キミと季節と陽だまりと) (August 1, 2008) (You, the Seasons, and the Sunshine)
- Honō no Overdrive ~Car Robot Cybertron~ (炎のオーバードライブ～カーロボットサイバトロン～) (Transformers: Car Robots Opening Theme) (May 24, 2000)
- Fire!! / With the Will (April 24, 2002) (Digimon Frontier)
- Innocent: Mujaki na mama de (イノセント～無邪気なままで～) (May 22, 2002)
- An Endless tale (November 22, 2002) (featuring AiM)
- Hirari (ヒラリ) (November 5, 2006) (Digimon Savers)
- Miracle Maker (February 2003) (feat. AiM & Takayoshi Tanimoto as "Spirit of Adventure")
- Daybreak (c/w "Innocent ~Mujaki na Mama de~")
- for the future (c/w "Hirari")
- Haruka na Okurimono (遥かな贈りもの) (A Faraway Gift) (c/w "an Endless tale") (featuring AiM)
- Yūki o Uketsugu Kodomo-tachi e (勇気を受け継ぐ子供達へ) (with AiM, Michihiko Ohta, Ayumi Miyazaki, Takayoshi Tanimoto, Sammy, and Hassy)
- Mirai e no Tobira ~Ano Natsu no Hi Kara~ (未来への扉～あの夏の日から～) (with AiM, Michihiko Oota, Takayoshi Tanimoto, Sammy, and Hassy)
- Days (with Hassy, AiM, Kanako Ito, and Sammy)
- We are Xros Heart (August 1, 2010) Digimon Xros Wars
- The Hero who Dances in the Sky! X5! (December 1, 2010) Digimon Xros Wars
- Evolution & DigiXros/We are Xros Heart ver. X7 (June 9, 2011) Digimon Xros Wars
- Butter-Fly〜tri. Version〜 (November 25, 2015) Digimon Adventure tri.
- Seven〜tri. Version〜 (March 30, 2016) Digimon Adventure tri.
