= List of Digimon Frontier episodes =

Digimon Frontier
- No. of episodes: 50

Release
- Original network: Fuji TV
- Original release: April 7, 2002 – March 30, 2003

Season chronology
- ← Previous; Digimon Tamers Next → Digimon Data Squad

The 50-episode anime series Digimon Frontier, produced by Toei Animation in 2002, is the fourth series in the Digimon franchise. It does not follow the plot of any of its three predecessors, Digimon Adventure and Digimon Adventure 02 and Digimon Tamers. Instead, the story features five children who are prompted by unusual phone messages to go to a subway station and take a train to the Digital World. After two Digimons, Bokomon and Neemon, reveal that the Digital World is in danger due to Kerpymon and his henchmen, the children gain the power to transform into Digimon in order to stop the evil forces seeking to destroy the Digital World. The series was directed by Yukio Kaikawa and written by Sukehiro Tomita and Akatsuki Yamatoya, featuring music by Takanori Arisawa.

The season aired 50 episodes on Fuji TV in Japan from April 7, 2002, to March 30, 2003. Unlike the previous three series, Digimon Frontier aired on UPN and ABC in the United States, beginning on September 9, 2002, to July 14, 2003, and later re-aired on ABC Family. In Canada, the series aired on YTV. The series was also scheduled to air in the United Kingdom on Fox Kids UK, though the scheduling plans were eventually cancelled and never aired on the programming block, being instead taken over by Transformers Armada. On 27 February 2007, this series of Digimon was first aired in Australia on Toasted TV despite that it was already shown on Cheez TV in 2003. The Latino American version was first aired from March to June 2003 on weekdays at 8:30 p.m. (-4 GMT) on Fox Kids. The first four episodes were aired on Sunday during the Digimon Tamers marathon.

Kōji Wada's song "FIRE!!" was used as the opening theme for the series. The two ending themes were "Innocent ~Mujaki na Mama de~", by Kōji Wada, and "an Endless tale" by Kōji Wada and Ai Maeda.

The fourth season of Digimon: Digital Monsters (aka Digimon Frontier) was formerly licensed by Disney's Sensation Animation in North America, and was also formerly distributed by Buena Vista Television and BVS Entertainment, also in North America, when it aired on Disney's Animation Weekdays on UPN, Toon Disney, and ABC Family. After the first four seasons of Digimon, Disney and BVS Entertainment had lost the rights to continue dubbing Digimon, the rest of Digimon was handled and dubbed in English by Studiopolis before Saban Brands's acquisition of Digimon. The four previously undubbed Digimon movies were dubbed by Studiopolis: Revenge of Diaboromon (DA02), Battle of Adventurers (DT), Runaway Locomon (DT) and Island of the Lost Digimon (DF) in 2005 and the fifth TV season, Digimon Data Squad in 2007.

== Episode list ==
No.	English Title (Original Japanese title translated to English) Original Japanese title	Original release date	US air date
1	"All Aboard!" ("The Legendary Warrior! Agnimon of Fire"); Transliteration: "Densetsu no Tōshi! Honō no Agnimon" (Japanese: 伝説の闘士! 炎のアグニモン)	April 7, 2002	September 9, 2002
Takuya Kanbara, who is guided by a mysterious cell phone message, boards a train to the Digital World with three other children, J.P. Shibayama, Zoe Orimoto, and Tommy Himi. Tommy, reluctantly joining, nearly meets danger chasing a Trailmon. A threat emerges when Cerberumon hunts the Human Spirit of Flame, but Takuya transforms into Agunimon, defeating Cerberumon effortlessly, establishing his newfound heroic role.
2	"Lobomon: Warrior of Light" ("Wolfmon of Light, The Underground Labyrinth Battle!"); Transliteration: "Hikari no Vorufumon Chikameikyū no Tatakai!" (Japanese: 光のヴォルフモン 地下迷宮の戦い！)	April 14, 2002	September 16, 2002
J.P. and Tommy, stranded in the Digital World, attract the attention of a group of Pagumon, who pursue them. Their escape leads them into an underground labyrinth, where they encounter Koji Minamoto. However, one Pagumon transforms into the formidable Raremon. Takuya transforms into Agunimon but reverts before finishing Raremon, inadvertently sending Koji tumbling into a hole where Koji finds the Human Spirit of Light, becoming Lobomon.
3	"Kumamon Baby, Light My Fire" ("Bullying is Unforgivable! Evolve, Chakukmon of Ice"); Transliteration: "Ijime wa Yurusanai! Kōri no Chakkumon Shinka" (Japanese: いじめは許さない！氷のチャックモン進化)	April 21, 2002	September 23, 2002
The group, excluding Koji, en route to the Forest Terminal, is ambushed by a swarm of Candlemon. Agunimon's fire attacks prove ineffective, but Tommy's bravery summons the Human Spirit of Ice, Kumamon.
4	"Kazemon Kicks It" ("My Kick is Painful! Female Warrior Fairymon"); Transliteration: "Watashi no Kikku wa Itai wa yo! Onna Tōshi Fearimon" (Japanese: 私のキックは痛いわよ！女闘士フェアリモン)	April 28, 2002	September 30, 2002
Takuya, Tommy, Zoe and J.P. follow a rail-road track to the Forest Terminal. The track eventually splits; Zoe and J.P. go left while Takuya and Tommy go right. Zoe and J.P. meet a village full of Floramon who are constantly harassed by the Mushroomon. Zoe receives the Human Spirit of Wind, Kazemon, allowing her to fight the Mushroomon. However, she's overpowered when they evolve into Woodmon, who are defeated with the sudden arrival of Koji.
5	"Ladies and Gentlemen: The Beetlemon" ("Thunder Power Shaking the Ground, Blitzmon!"); Transliteration: "Daichi o Yurugasu Ikazura Pawā, Burittsumon!" (Japanese: 大地を揺るがす雷パワー ブリッツモン！)	May 5, 2002	October 7, 2002
The group, with Koji absent once more, stumbles upon a wind factory operated by Kokuwamon, Goblimon, and Minomon. Hoping to find food, they tour the factory, only to discover that the Goblimon has enslaved the Kokuwamon under the command of the malevolent Snimon. The team hatches a plan to liberate the Kokuwamon by destroying the factory, though J.P. is unable to participate due to not yet having his spirit. The plan goes awry, and they face defeat until J.P. locates his Human Spirit of Thunder at the heart of the factory, transforming into Beetlemon.
6	"A Molehill Out of a Mountain" ("The Five Legendary Warriors VS The New Warrior!"); Transliteration: "Denetsu no Gotōshi tai Aratanaru Tōshi!" (Japanese: 伝説の5闘士VS新たなる闘士!)	May 12, 2002	October 14, 2002
While searching for food, Takuya, Tommy, Zoe, and J.P. encounter KaratsukiNumemon, who promises them sustenance in exchange for assistance. Accepting the challenge, they embark on a train journey up a cliff to the KaratsukiNumemon's abode. During their stay, they reunite with Koji and collaborate to free the female KaratsukiNumemon. However, their plans are disrupted when Grumblemon, the sinister Legendary Warrior of Earth, intervenes. A fierce battle ensues with Grumblemon transforming into Gigasmon, his powerful Beast Warrior form, which the group has not seen before.
7	"Island of Misfit Boys" ("Town Floating in the Sky! Toy Country of ToyAgumon"); Transliteration: "Sora ni Ukabu Machi! Toiagumon no Omocha no Kuni" (Japanese: 空に浮かぶ街! トイアグモンのおもちゃの国)	May 19, 2002	October 21, 2002
The group is split into two after a fall. Takuya, Koji, and Tommy find themselves on a moving toy island inhabited by WaruMonzaemon, Pandamon, and malevolent ShadowToyAgumon. WaruMonzaemon kidnaps Tommy, prompting Takuya and Koji to embark on a mission to rescue him, with Pandamon's assistance. In a team effort, Agunimon and Lobomon confront the ShadowToyAgumon, successfully defeating and purifying them, transforming them back into benign ToyAgumon.
8	"Odd One Out" ("Save Everyone! Evolve Tsunomon"); Transliteration: "Minna o Sukue! Shinka surun da Tsunomon" (Japanese: みんなを救え! 進化するんだツノモン)	May 26, 2002	October 28, 2002
Zoe, J.P., Bokomon and Neemon come across a Digimon School run by a Togemon. One of the pupils, Tsunomon, is having a hard time fitting in because he can digivolve to Gabumon. When a flash flood heads straight for the school, Kazemon and Beetlemon make a barrier, but Kapurimon is thrown into the water. Tsunomon digivolves to Gabumon to save him and becomes a role model for all the other students.
9	"Welcome to My Nightmare" ("Chakumon is the Enemy!? The Mysterious TV Forest"); Transliteration: "Teki wa Chakumon!? Nazo no Terebi no Mori" (Japanese: 敵はチャックモン!? 謎のテレビの森)	June 2, 2002	November 11, 2002
The group reunites in the enigmatic TV Forest, where their peaceful gathering is disrupted by an evil Bakumon, who has been corrupted by Cherubimon's influence. Bakumon turns Tommy against the others, creating discord within the group. Koji receives a message on his D-Tector, signaling the presence of his Beast Spirit nearby, setting the stage for new developments in their journey.
10	"Can't Keep a Grumblemon Down" ("Uncontrollable Beast Spirit! Garmmon's Evolution"); Transliteration: "Bīsuto Supiritto wa Seigyo Funō!? Garumumon Shinka!" (Japanese: ビーストスピリットは制御不能!? ガルムモン進化!)	June 9, 2002	November 12, 2002
Koji looks for his Beast Spirit while the children come across a Gotsumon village, which is terrorized by Grumblemon. Lobomon confronts Grumblemon and a battle ensues. With the help of a Gotsumon, Koji gets his Beast Spirit and he transforms into KendoGarurumon, whom he is unfortunately unable to control. Ultimately, both he and Gigasmon fall off a cliff, but Gotsumon saves Koji.
11	"A Hunka Hunka BurningGreymon" ("Defeat Me! Legendary Warrior Vritramon Runs Wild"); Transliteration: "Ore o Taose! Densetsu no Tōshi Vuritoramon Bōsō" (Japanese: 俺を倒せ! 伝説の闘士ヴリトラモン暴走)	June 16, 2002	November 13, 2002
The group visits a fortune-telling village and meets Shamanmon, but Grumblemon arrives with Golemon, trapping Koji. Agunimon, Beetlemon, and Kumamon team up to defeat Golemon, but Tommy loses his spirit to Gigasmon. Possessed by the Beast Spirit of Fire, Shamanmon attacks. As BurningGreymon, Shamanmon defeats Golemon and drives off Gigasmon. Realizing Shamanmon is possessed, Agunimon takes him on but struggles. Shamanmon briefly regains control, allowing Agunimon to defeat him and free Shamanmon. However, Takuya loses control over the Beast Spirit, leading to a showdown between KendoGarurumon and BurningGreymon.
12	"Fear and Loathing in Los Arboles" ("Roar, Vritramon! Defeat Gigasmon!"); Transliteration: "Hoero Vuritoramon! Taose Gigasumon!" (Japanese: ほえろヴリトラモン! 倒せギガスモン!)	June 23, 2002	November 14, 2002
Takuya loses control of his Beast Spirit, BurningGreymon, and endangers everyone. However, Tommy's pleas help him regain control, though he becomes afraid to use his Beast Spirit again. Grumblemon attacks again, capturing the others, and kidnaps Tommy. Takuya initially transforms into Agunimon, but he is overpowered by Gigasmon. Desperate to save Tommy, Takuya takes a chance and transforms into BurningGreymon, this time with full control. With Grumblemon repelled, Ranamon, Mercurymon, Arbormon, and Duskmon, the remaining Legendary Warriors, make their appearance, setting the stage for new challenges.
13	"Better an Egg than an Egg Shell" ("Seraphimon Awakens! Secret of the Ten Warriors"); Transliteration: "Mezameyo Serafimon! Jū Tōshi no Himitsu" (Japanese: 目覚めよセラフィモン! 十闘士の秘密)	June 30, 2002	November 15, 2002
The team reaches the Forest Terminal and encounters Sorcerymon, who guides them to a frozen Seraphimon. Seraphimon shares the prophecy of the Legendary Warriors and reveals the existence of the benevolent Celestial Digimon, Ophanimon. However, Mercurymon, Arbormon, Ranamon, and Grumblemon arrive and engage in a fierce battle with Seraphimon. Tragically, Mercurymon reflects Seraphimon's attack, leading to his destruction and the capture of his Fractal Code. The DigiDestined escapes with Seraphimon's egg, at the cost of Sorcerymon's sacrifice, as they now set out on a mission to locate Ophanimon.
14	"No Whamon" ("Rock Breaking Thunder! Bolgmon's Do-or-Die Challenge""); Transliteration: "Kaminari yo! Iwa o mo Kudake! Borugumon Kesshi no Charenji" (Japanese: 雷よ! 岩をも砕け! ボルグモン決死のチャレンジ)	July 14, 2002	November 18, 2002
The kids are led by Trailmon to an underwater cave where they encounter a Whamon, who was trapped by Grumblemon. Grumblemon, aided by Arbormon's transformation into Petaldramon and a group of Golemon, battles the kids. Whamon's attack also releases J.P.'s Beast Spirit, leading to his transformation into MetalKabuterimon. Initially uncontrollable, MetalKabuterimon inadvertently brings down the cave on them, defeating Petaldramon. However, he regains control and confronts Grumblemon. In a single shot, MetalKabuterimon defeats Grumblemon and the last Golemon, then transforms back into Beetlemon to reclaim Grumblemon's remaining Spirit.
15	"Beastie Girl" ("Cool Beast Evolution! Calmaramon"); Transliteration: "Ikashita Bīsuto Shinka! Karumāramon" (Japanese: イカしたビースト進化! カルマーラモン)	July 21, 2002	November 19, 2002
The group finds themselves on an idyllic island managed by four adoring Toucanmon, who also happen to be fans of Ranamon, and steal their D-Tectors, except for Zoe's. Ranamon appears, and Zoe transforms into Kazemon to confront her. Unfortunately, Kazemon is outmatched, and matters worsen when Ranamon acquires her Beast Spirit and transforms into Calmaramon. With the Toucanmon missing, the group rushes after them to recover their stolen D-Tectors.
16	"The Swiss Family Digimon" ("Strength Does Not Matter! The Beautiful Warrior, Shutumon"); Transliteration: "Tsuyoi Dake ja Dame na no yo! Utsukushiki Tōshi Shūtsumon" (Japanese: 強いだけじゃだめなのよ! 美しき闘士シューツモン)	July 28, 2002	November 20, 2002
The Toucanmon absconds with the boys' D-Tectors to an island. The group encounters a group of Gomamon, who warn them about treacherous whirlpools preventing access to Goma Island. Determined to return home, they construct a raft to bypass the whirlpools. However, Ranamon arrives, having gained control of her Beast Spirit through intense training. Zoe evolves into Kazemon, but she is once again outmatched by Ranamon. However, she discovers her Beast Spirit, transforming into Zephyrmon. With the boys' assistance, Zephyrmon distracts Calmaramon long enough to counter her, and Calmaramon loses control of her Beast Spirit and flies away. The team, along with the Gomamon, reaches Goma Island and celebrate being home. They discover the Toucanmon have left for the Autumn Leaf Fair on a nearby continent to sell the D-Tectors.
17	"Bizarre Bazaar" ("Blizzarmon, Blow the Snow, Call the Glaciers!"); Transliteration: "Burizāmon Fukeyo Yuki, Yobeyo Hyōga!" (Japanese: ブリザーモン 吹けよ雪、呼べよ氷河!)	August 4, 2002	November 21, 2002
The group arrives at the Autumn Leaf Fair in search of their D-Tectors. Tommy earns the trust of Datamon and wins a game for him, eventually securing the D-Tectors. The Toucanmon initially takes them back, but Datamon returns them to Tommy, revealing he programmed Tommy's new Beast Spirit into it. Arbormon's attempt to trade for the D-Tectors fails when Datamon refuses, having witnessed Tommy's bravery. Arbormon digivolves into Petaldramon, and a battle ensues. With the help of Datamon, Tommy regains his D-Tector and Beast Spirit, transforming into Korikakumon.
18	"Trailmon vs. Trailmon" ("Choo-Choo! The Great Trailmon Race"); Transliteration: "Chikichiki! Toreirumon Mō Rēsu" (Japanese: チキチキ! トレイルモン猛レース)	August 11, 2002	November 22, 2002
A Trailmon race is disrupted by ShadowWereGarurumon and Dogmon, causing a shortage of partners for the other Trailmon, so the group are filling in as replacements. Note: This episode is a parody of the 1968 cartoon Wacky Races.
19	"You Want Fries with That?" ("Save the Burgermon! Tomoki's Pure Heart!"); Transliteration: "Bāgamon o Sukue! Tomoki no Pyua na Kokoro" (Japanese: バーガモンを救え! 友樹のピュアな心)	August 18, 2002	December 16, 2002
Petaldramon, aided by Chamelmon, attacks a Burgermon village and captures the head chef. The group tries to rescue him by making the perfect burger, so the kids plan to rescue the chef. With the Burgermon kids' help, they trap and defeat Chamelmon.
20	"From Dawn to Duskmon" ("Mystery Warrior Hidden in Darkness, Duskmon!"); Transliteration: "Yami ni Hisomu Nazo no Tōshi Dasukumon!" (Japanese: 闇にひそむ謎の闘士 ダスクモン!)	August 25, 2002	December 17, 2002
The group is expelled from their Trailmon as it fears the Continent of Darkness. Cherubimon's Evil Legendary Warriors surrender the collected Fractal Code, except for Seraphimon's, which Cherubimon allows Mercurymon to keep for now. He orders Arbormon to destroy the kids. Arbormon attacks and evolves into Petaldramon, growing to a colossal size. The kids Beast Spirit evolve and, through teamwork, overpower Petaldramon. However, Duskmon appears, destroys Arbormon as he is now useless, and prepares to face the Legendary Warriors himself.
21	"Darkest Before Duskmon" ("Total Destruction of 5 Fighters!? Terrifying Dark Power"); Transliteration: "Go Tōshi Zenmetsu!? Osorerubeki Yami no Pawā!" (Japanese: 五闘士全滅!? 恐るべき闇のパワー!)	September 1, 2002	December 18, 2002
Duskmon defeats all Legendary Warriors with most in their Beast Spirit forms, so they decide to regroup and plan out their attack. Takuya gets cocky and believes they are unstoppable despite Koji's warnings. In the battle, Takuya as Agunimon tries to restrain Duskmon and allow the others in their Beast forms to defeat them, but the attack fails. Agunimon is nearly killed, but KendoGarurumon leaps in and takes the blow instead, leaving Koji severely wounded. Upon hearing Takuya scream his name, Duskmon seemingly recognizes Koji and screams out in anguish, releasing a dark cloud. Despondent, Takuya hops on a Trailmon and returns home.
22	"Home Again, Takuya Returns" ("My home! Takuya's Lonely Return"); Transliteration: "Wagaya e! Takuya Tatta Hitori no Kikan" (Japanese: 我が家へ! 拓也たった一人の帰還)	September 8, 2002	December 19, 2002
Takuya unexpectedly travels back to the past, to the day he first arrived in the Digital World. He reverts to a Digimon, Flamemon, and is haunted by the image of Duskmon. Takuya realizes that his friends and the Digital World still need him, and he passionately urges his past self to continue his journey. This act helps him regain his spirit and a Dark Trailmon offers him a ride back to the Digital World, which Takuya accepts, ultimately evolving back into Agunimon during the journey.
23	"Sockit Takuya" ("Feel the Power of Digimon! Takuya's Full-Body Strategy"); Transliteration: "Kanjiro Dejimon no Chikara! Takuya Konshin no Sakusen" (Japanese: 感じろデジモンの力! 拓也渾身の作戦)	September 15, 2002	February 10, 2003
Takuya returns to the Digital World as Agunimon, only to return to a crater where the previous battle with Duskmon occurred. He eventually rescues Bokomon and Neemon from Sepikmon, and they learn that their friends, except Koji, have been captured by Mercurymon and Ranamon, so Agunimon sets out to free them.
24	"Alone but Never Alone" ("Confrontation, Volcamon! Junpei's Battle with his Past""); Transliteration: "Taiketsu Borukēmon! Junpei, Kako to no Gekitō" (Japanese: 対決ボルケーモン! 純平、過去との激闘)	September 22, 2002	February 11, 2003
On their journey to the Rose Morning Star, the group are drawn into a massive structure composed of ten orbs, revealing the Beast Warrior of Steel, Sakkakumon. Inside Sakkakumon, J.P. is pushed into the Sphere of Earth and faces Volcamon, who preys on his fears about his friends. J.P. transforms into Beetlemon and defeats Volcamon, but is then confronted by an evil version of his own shadow. J.P. overcomes his fear and defeats his shadow just before he and the others are pushed into various portals and separated once more.
25	"The Dark Heart of Friendship" ("Tomoki's Lonely Battle – Asuramon's Trap"); Transliteration: "Tomoki no Kodoku na Tatakai, Ashuramon no Wana" (Japanese: 友樹の孤独な戦い アシュラモンの罠)	September 29, 2002	February 12, 2003
In the Fire Sphere, Tommy is initially deceived by Asuramon, who claims to be his friend, but only wants his Spirits. Tommy realizes the importance of true friendship and defeats Asuramon, evolving into Korikakumon. In the Wind Sphere, Koji confronts Karatenmon, who mocks him for avoiding friendships. Koji's past pain is linked to his mother, causing his reluctance to form bonds. He transforms into KendoGarurumon, outmaneuvering Karatenmon and defeating him.
26	"Zoe's Unbeelievable Adventure" ("Ranamon's Tenacity! Female Digimon Personal Combat"); Transliteration: "Rānamon no Shūnen! Onna Dejimon Ikki Uchi" (Japanese: ラーナモンの執念! 女デジモン一騎撃ち)	October 6, 2002	February 13, 2003
Zoe is stuck in the Water Sphere, where she has a flashback about being teased and finding a new friend. The Honeybeemon sets various traps for her, but they fall into them and Zoe has to rescue them each time. She earns their friendship in doing so, but a jealous Ranamon has the Honeybeemon give her a poisoned apple to make her hallucinate her troubling friendships. However, this increases Zoe's desire to be a better friend in the future, and when Ranamon insults her, Zoe's determination to be a better friend prevails, and she transforms into Kazemon, eventually defeating Ranamon as Zephyrmon with the Honeybeemon's support. Meanwhile, In the Wood Sphere, J.P. faces Cherrymon, swiftly transforming into Beetlemon to defeat it. In the Thunder Sphere, Takuya confronts Parrotmon and easily defeats it as Agunimon.
27	"Stuck in Sakkakumon with You" ("Double Spirit Miracle! Beowulfmon is Born"); Transliteration: "Kiseki no Daburu Supiritto! Beourufumon Tanjō" (Japanese: 奇跡のダブルスピリット! ベオウルフモン誕生)	October 13, 2002	February 14, 2003
To rescue their friends, J.P., Zoe, and Tommy attempt to break into Sakkakumon, but ultimately fail. Duskmon, driven by his curiosity about his reactions to Koji's pain, manages to enter the Darkness Sphere to confront Koji. The group communicates with Takuya, explaining that they're trapped inside Sakkakumon and must defeat their opponents to escape, but Koji is in trouble. Duskmon explores Koji's memories, learning about Koji's distant relationship with his stepmother and his desire to make amends. Koji transforms into Lobomon, and then KendoGarurumon, but is defeated by Duskmon. However, Seraphimon's Digi-Egg grants him the power to Fusion Evolve into Beowolfmon. During the fight, both of their true forms are briefly revealed, revealing that Duskmon is actually the boy who looks like Koji, whom Takuya had briefly seen on his return to the human world. Their fight causes an explosion that blows them out of Sakkakumon just before Agunimon reaches them.
28	"Darkness Before the Dawn" ("Takuya's Fusion Evolution – Aldamon's Explosive Attack"); Transliteration: "Takuya no Yūgō Shinka Arudamon Waza Sakuretsu!" (Japanese: 拓也の融合進化 アルダモン技炸裂!)	October 20, 2002	February 17, 2003
Agunimon enters the Steel Sphere and faces a manifestation of Mercurymon, who has the ability to reflect attacks and appear in mirrors. Agunimon is outmatched and follows Mercurymon to the Light Sphere, where Mercurymon holds Seraphimon's Fractal Code. Using this code, Mercurymon evolves into ShadowSeraphimon and easily defeats Agunimon and BurningGreymon. Bokomon's pleas lead Seraphimon's Digi-Egg to grant Takuya the power to Fusion Evolve into Aldamon. As Aldamon, Takuya proves more than a match for ShadowSeraphimon, retrieves Seraphimon's Fractal Code, and returns it to Seraphimon's Digi-Egg. Aldamon tracks Mercurymon back to the Steel Sphere, defeats him, and collects the Human Spirit of Steel, although Mercurymon survives in the form of Sakkakumon. Takuya reunites with the others in time for Seraphimon's Digi-Egg to hatch into Patamon.
29	"Phantasmagoric Sakkakumon" ("Escape! The Phantasmagoric Sefirotmon"); Transliteration: "Tōsō! Hengen Jizai Serufirotomon" (Japanese: 逃走! 変幻自在セフィロトモン)	October 27, 2002	February 18, 2003
After Mercurymon returns in his Beast Spirit form as Sakkakumon, the group finds themselves unable to defeat him as he reflects their attacks. Utilizing their Digimon senses and combining their attacks, they manage to weaken Sakkakumon. They discover that the central sphere, the Sphere of Darkness, never moves or attacks. They halt the movement of Sakkakumon's spheres. Then, Aldamon attacks on the central sphere, leading to Sakkakumon's destruction. With Sakkakumon (and Mercurymon) eliminated, Duskmon remains as the last of the evil Legendary Warriors.
30	"O, Brother, Who Art Thou?" ("Soaring! Warrior of Darkness Velgmon"); Transliteration: "Hishō! Yami no Tōshi Berugumon" (Japanese: 飛翔! 闇の闘士ベルグモン)	November 3, 2002	February 19, 2003
Duskmon and Beowolfmon continue their intense battle. Meanwhile, Patamon guides the rest of the group to Koji, but Cherubimon traps them, and they eventually escape by digging their way out. Duskmon, struggling, receives the Beast Spirit of Darkness from Cherubimon, transforming into Velgemon. Velgemon easily overpowers Beowolfmon, and Koji narrowly escapes a potentially fatal attack. Before Velgemon can deliver a final blow, Ophanimon intervenes through Koji's D-Tector, reminding Velgemon of his past in the human world. It turns out that Velgemon is Koji's long-lost twin brother, Koichi, who discovered his familial connection just before entering the Digital World. His confusion leads Velgemon to fly away, leaving Koji alone.
31	"Workin' on the Train Gang" ("Sleep in Darkness – The Trailmon's Graveyard"); Transliteration: "Yami ni Nemuru Toreirumon no Hakaba" (Japanese: 闇に眠る トレイルモンの墓場)	November 10, 2002	February 20, 2003
The gang reunites, but Koji decides to chase after Duskmon to uncover their connection, with Takuya following him. J.P. chooses not to wait and seeks out a Digimon who might know about the Rose Morning Star. They find Angler, a dying Trailmon, in a graveyard, who claims to have information but manipulates them into helping him by pretending to know more than he does. After Angler's apparent demise and renewal, the group initially prepares to confront him in their Beast Spirit forms but ultimately decides he's not worth the trouble. Angler eventually reveals that he was forced to carry a container to a castle at the Rose Morning Star shortly after the battle between the three Celestial Digimon. The group deduces that the container must hold Ophanimon.
32	"My Brother in Spirit" ("The Revealed Past! Duskmon's Secret"); Transliteration: "Akasareta Kako! Dasukumon no Himitsu" (Japanese: 明かされた過去! ダスクモンの秘密)	November 17, 2002	March 24, 2003
Duskmon is reluctant to fight Koji after recognizing him as his brother, but he is manipulated by Cherubimon to exploit his anger about their father abandoning their sick mother. In a confrontation as Beowolfmon, Duskmon reveals the truth to Koji about their twin relationship, and overpowers Beowolfmon, nearly defeating Koji as Velgemon, but Takuya saves him. Koji remains hesitant to fight, and Takuya evolves into Aldamon to battle Velgemon alone, but he is outmatched. However, Koji finally decides to step up, evolving into Beowolfmon, and with Aldamon's help, they manage to weaken Velgemon and ultimately defeat him. Koji's actions purify the Spirits of Darkness, freeing Koichi.
33	"Ne'er the Twins Shall Meet" ("The New Warriors of Darkness! Löwemon & JägerLöwemon"); Transliteration: "Aratanaru Yami no Tōshi! Rēbemon to Kaizāreomon" (Japanese: 新たなる闇の闘士! レーベモンとカイザーレオモン)	November 24, 2002	March 25, 2003
Koichi reveals his backstory as Koji's twin brother and his struggles, and chooses to remain distant from the group due to his guilt. As they journey toward the Rose Morning Star, Cherubimon attacks, overpowering the other five kids, and offers Koichi the chance to rejoin him, but Koichi rejects darkness and obtains a D-Tector, becoming the true holder of the Spirits of Darkness. Transforming into Löwemon and JägerLöwemon, Koichi defeats Cherubimon, but it is revealed to be a projection.
34	"Operation: Free Ophanimon" ("Decisive Battle!! Rose of the Morning Star – Ophanimon's Rescue Plan""); Transliteration: "Kessen! Bara no Myōjō Ofanimon Kyūshutsu Sakusen" (Japanese: 決戦! バラの明星 オファニモン救出作戦)	December 1, 2002	March 26, 2003
The group finally arrives at the Rose Morning Star and encounters a castle where data is being drawn to it. Koichi explains that Cherubimon is collecting data for an unknown purpose. They spirit evolve to enter the castle, only to be attacked by Phantomon at the gate. Löwemon manages to free the others by defeating the Phantomon. Inside the castle, they meet Oryxmon, who leads them to an imprisoned Ophanimon. Ophanimon reveals the history of a war between Human and Beast Digimon, Lucemon's rise and fall, and Cherubimon's corruption. Cherubimon wounded Seraphimon, and Ophanimon surrendered herself to save Seraphimon. Cherubimon turned evil, created the Evil Legendary Warriors, and aimed to use the children's spirits and the collected data to conquer the Digital World. Cherubimon confronts them, revealing that their arrival was part of his plan to acquire their Spirits. The Spirits start reacting, creating tension among the kids.
35	"Takuya and Koji's Evolution Revolution" ("Turn the Spirits Into One! Takuya and Kouji's Ultimate Evolution!"); Transliteration: "Supiritto o Hitotsu ni! Takuya to Kōji no Kyūkyoku Shinka" (Japanese: スピリットを一つに! 拓也と輝二の究極進化)	December 8, 2002	March 27, 2003
Cherubimon destroys Oryxmon, revealing that he used Duskmon (Koichi) to ensure that all the Spirits reached his castle for his evil plan. Löwemon attacks Cherubimon but is weakened in the room full of light, and his efforts are in vain. Takuya and Koji transform into Aldamon and Beowolfmon and take the fight outside, while the others work on freeing Ophanimon. Aldamon and Beowolfmon are eventually defeated by Cherubimon, who takes their D-Tectors and attacks the rest of the group. Ophanimon breaks free at the last moment and retrieves the D-Tectors from Cherubimon and returns them to the kids before teleporting them outside. She instructs them to combine their Spirits to defeat Cherubimon before sacrificing herself. With Ophanimon upgrading Takuya and Koji's D-Tectors, the group splits the Spirits between them, allowing Takuya to become EmperorGreymon and Koji to become MagnaGarurumon.
36	"Ice Ice Baby" ("The Flight Towards Victory! Confrontation at Cherubimon's Castle"); Transliteration: "Shōri e no Hishō! Taiketsu Kerubimon no Shiro" (Japanese: 勝利への飛翔! 対決ケルビモンの城)	December 15, 2002	March 28, 2003
Takuya and Koji, now EmperorGreymon and MagnaGarurumon, battle Cherubimon after ensuring their friends' safety in Cherubimon's castle. They eventually defeat Cherubimon, but he disappears, and his castle is destroyed. The group then engages in a battle with IceDevimon, but he is too strong for them, and quickly freezes Takuya and Koji's D-Tectors, rendering them unable to fight. IceDevimon defeats the others, but Koichi transforms into Löwemon, and with a combination of their Digivolutions and teamwork, they manage to weaken and defeat IceDevimon. They discover that Cherubimon is still collecting data in the ruins of his castle, indicating an ongoing threat.
37	"Cherubimania" ("Decisive Battle! As Long as There is Life – Get Back the Digital World"); Transliteration: "Kessen! Inochi Aru Kagiri Dejitaru Wārudo o Torimodose" (Japanese: 決戦! 命ある限り デジタルワールドを取り戻せ)	December 22, 2002	May 11, 2003
Takuya and Koji, as EmperorGreymon and MagnaGarurumon, engage Cherubimon in a final battle at his castle. Cherubimon absorbs a vast amount of data and transforms himself into a colossal form. The two warriors face Cherubimon but are initially overpowered. However, they use a strategy in which MagnaGarurumon absorbs Cherubimon's attacks to allow EmperorGreymon to get close and land a fatal blow to Cherubimon's forehead, purifying him. Cherubimon dies, and his release of data travels to the Dark Area, partially breaking the seal containing Lucemon. Lucemon's data summons the Royal Knights to continue Cherubimon's mission of freeing him.
38	"It Can't Be! Lucemon Reappears" ("The Endless Death Match! Prelude of Lucemon's Revival"); Transliteration: "Owaranai Shitō! Rūchemon Fukkatsu no Jokyoku" (Japanese: 終わらない死闘! ルーチェモン復活の序曲)	January 5, 2003	May 12, 2003
Despite defeating Cherubimon, the land is not restored, and Baromon warns the team of Lucemon's return and takes them to the Tunnel of History to show how Lucemon's corruption led to Cherubimon's fall and the gathering of data from the Digital World. He explains that Lucemon is still a threat, and his two unknown minions are carrying out his work. The group decides to stay and prevent Lucemon's return. However, the Royal Knights, Dynasmon and Crusadermon, arrive and prove too powerful, defeating the group and even destroying Baromon to protect their mission. The Royal Knights launch a devastating attack, sending the group to the moon, while Lucemon demands more data collection.
39	"The Man in the Moon is You" ("This is the Digital World?! Escape from the Moon!"); Transliteration: "Kore ga Dejitaru Wārudo!? Tsuki kara Dasshutsu" (Japanese: これがデジタルワールド!? 月からの脱出!)	January 12, 2003	May 13, 2003
The group is transported to the Digital World's Blue Moon after a battle with Dynasmon and Crusadermon, leaving them injured and unconscious. Koichi seeks help from Starmon, and with their assistance, the others recover. Meanwhile, Dynasmon and Crusadermon collect data for Lucemon's plan to return to the human world. The gang attempts various methods to return to the Digital World but discovers an electromagnetic stream blocking their way. With the aid of Starmon and Burgermon, they launch a rocket and successfully cross the stream.
40	"The Bully Pulpit" ("The Chosen Ones! The Children who Manipulate Digital Egg!"); Transliteration: "Ebareshimono!? Digital Egg o Ayatsuru Shōnen!" (Japanese: 選ばれし者!? 數碼蛋を操る少年!)	January 19, 2003	May 14, 2003
Dynasmon and Crusadermon collect more data while the main group returns to the Digital World in Steel Town, where they encounter Sagittarimon and are saved by four children named Katsuharu, Teppei, Teruo, and Chiaki, along with Angemon. Katsuharu and Teppei, previously who bullied Tommy, attempt to force him to leave the Digital World. The newcomers decide to stay, which leads to a conflict with Sagittarimon and Centarumon, but Tommy's bravery and the group's Digivolution help protect the newcomers.
41	"Jerks and the Beanstalk" ("Don't Let Them Scan! The Beanstalk of Friendship"); Transliteration: "Sukyan Saseru na! Yūjō no Mamenoki" (Japanese: スキャンさせるな! 友情の豆の木)	January 26, 2003	May 15, 2003
The Royal Knights capture Katsuharu, his friends, and Tommy, believing they know the location of a key to remove a giant beanstalk in Beanstalk Village, but the beanstalk blocks their data scanning efforts. The kids get locked up with the Mamemon villagers, and the rest of the kids venture out to rescue them. Mamemon reveals the key's location – a golden bean pod at the top of the beanstalk. When the pod is destroyed, the Royal Knights can scan the area, while the kids, Mamemon, Bokomon, Neemon, and Patamon escape. Katsuharu offers to take the Mamemon back to the human world, but they decide to plant a new bean to grow another beanstalk. Katsuharu and his friends return home, but not before reconciling with Tommy.
42	"Glean Eggs and Scram" ("Protect the DigiEggs! The Miracle of Disappearing Life"); Transliteration: "Dejitama o Mamore! Kieyuku Inochi no Kiseki" (Japanese: デジタマを守れ! 消えゆく命の奇跡)	February 2, 2003	May 16, 2003
The DigiDestined visits the Village of Beginnings, where new Digimon are born, and meet Swanmon, the caretaker who shares her struggles in transporting babies to their families because the Trailmon are afraid. The Royal Knights arrive, seeking to scan the Village. Takuya and Koji attempt to fight but hesitate due to the babies. Eventually, they are overpowered, and Zoe convinces the Trailmon to assist. In the battle, the babies help fend off the Royal Knights' attack. The purified Spirits of the other Warriors appear, and the group spirit evolves to defend the Village. They drive off the Royal Knights, who manage to scan the Village before leaving. The Village is saved as the babies are transported home. Although they do not win, the team remains determined to restore the Digital World.
43	"Bad to the Bones" ("Annihilation of the Hometown! Messenger of Hell Forest Village"); Transliteration: "Furusato Shōmetsu! Jigoku no Shisha Forest Village" (Japanese: 故郷消滅! 地獄の使者スカルサタモン)	February 9, 2003	July 6, 2003
The team worries about their chances of victory after their previous defeat against Dynasmon and Crusadermon. Poyomon warns them about the Village of Flames, which is under attack. They rush to the village and find SkullSatamon scanning the forest for data, sending it to Lucemon. The villagers lose faith in the kids, but they rally them to defend their homes. EmperorGreymon and MagnaGarurumon fight the SkullSatamon brothers but are overwhelmed. The villagers' attack helps them recover and counterattack, eventually defeating and purifying the SkullSatamon brothers. Crusadermon arrives and takes the data, but the fight restores the villagers' faith in the kids.
44	"Now You See It, Now You Don't" ("Fight together~ Kouji's Vow"); Transliteration: "Tomoni Tatakae! Kōji no Chikai" (Japanese: 共に戦え! 輝二の誓い)	February 16, 2003	July 7, 2003
The Royal Knights scan another area in the Digital World, and the kids help protect the statues, releasing the Beast Spirit of Light from Knightmon. The Royal Knights arrive, sacrifice their own Knightmon to scan the area before heading to the Forest Area. Koji's Gotsumon friend joins the group to save the world. They reach Seraphimon's Castle in the Forest Area, where they confront the Royal Knights and try to break through the energy barrier protecting the place. Dynasmon eventually breaks the barrier, and the Castle is destroyed. They are shielded by Sorcerymon's spirit as Dynasmon gains the data.
45	"All Aboard the Tag Team Express" ("The Data of Operation! Defend Akiba Market"); Transliteration: "Dēta Kakuran Sakusen! Akiba Māketto o Bōei Seyo" (Japanese: データかく乱作戦! アキバマーケットを防衛せよ)	February 23, 2003	July 8, 2003
The Royal Knights are on their way to the Autumn Leaf Fair in the Ice Area to scan data. The gang prepares for the upcoming showdown: Tommy, Koichi, and the Toucanmon build a snow catapult, while the others evacuate the town's residents. An army of Digimon attempts to stop the Royal Knights but is quickly defeated. EmperorGreymon and MagnaGarurumon battle the Royal Knights while the others assist with the catapult. EmperorGreymon struggles against Dynasmon until he draws power from the town's furnace. Crusadermon reveals important information about the Fractal Code and physical form, but she is defeated by MagnaGarurumon. Dynasmon and Crusadermon collect scattered data, which forces the kids to regroup. EmperorGreymon blows away the Knights, but they escape with the data. The gang heads to the Light Area to protect Ophanimon's Castle, the last area in the Digital World.
46	"To Make the World Go Away" ("Annihilation of the Digital World!? Lucemon's Rule of Darkness""); Transliteration: "Dejitaru Wārudo Shōmetsu!? Rūchemon Ankoku Shihai" (Japanese: デジタルワールド消滅!? ルーチェモン暗黒支配)	March 2, 2003	July 9, 2003
The kids arrive at the Light Area and Ophanimon's Castle to find its data before the Royal Knights, who then arrive and reveal their intention to scan the area. EmperorGreymon and MagnaGarurumon engage in combat, but they are overwhelmed by Lucemon's energy beams. The Knights destroy Nefertimon, scan the data, and free Lucemon. To everyone's surprise, Lucemon appears as a child-like Digimon with the goal of creating a new Digital World and unleashes a powerful blast, but the kids are saved by an Angler Trailmon who transports them to the Yellow Moon. Despite the Digital World's destruction, the team remains determined to stop Lucemon and save their world.
47	"When Knights Fall..." ("The Royal Knights Disperse – And then...!!"); Transliteration: "Roiyaru Naitsu Chiru, Soshite..." (Japanese: ロイヤルナイツ散る そして...!!)	March 9, 2003	July 10, 2003
The group reaches the Yellow Moon, where most of them lose hope for the Digital World and Koichi is troubled by Crusadermon's revelation about his existence as just a spirit. Lucemon meets the Royal Knights and is irritated by their demands for the key to the human world and Crusadermon's lack of faith in his promise. On the moon, they discover Digimon hatched from Dig-Eggs, including Lopmon and Salamon, who turn out to be Cherubimon and Ophanimon reborn. Their reconciliation inspires the group to restore the Digital World. Takuya and Koji evolve into EmperorGreymon and MagnaGarurumon, engaging in battle with the Knights. This time, the two prove more powerful and manage to defeat Crusadermon and Dynasmon. However, Lucemon arrives and absorbs the Knights' Fractal Code, becoming Lucemon: Chaos Mode. EmperorGreymon and MagnaGarurumon are ineffective against Lucemon, who retaliates by attacking and causing the moon to explode.
48	"The Brothers Yin and Yang" ("Turn Light and Darkness into One! Kouichi's Last Wish"); Transliteration: "Hikari to Yami o Hitotsu ni! Kōichi Saigo no Negai" (Japanese: 光と闇を一つに! 輝一最後の願い)	March 16, 2003	July 11, 2003
The Yellow Moon explodes, leading to a chain reaction that destroys the other moons and kills all of the Digimon on them. Lucemon departs, satisfied with his actions, not realizing the gang's survival. Patamon, Lopmon, and Salamon rescue Takuya and Koji, bringing them back to the despairing group. The Celestial Digimon explain that combining Light and Darkness is the key to defeating Lucemon, although they are unsure how to achieve it. Lucemon starts building a portal to the human world in the Dark Area. The group observes the data streams sent by Lucemon into space, creating a portal that shows Shibuya. Realizing the chaos that Digimon in the human world would cause, they spirit evolve into various forms and attack Lucemon in the Dark Area. However, their attacks prove futile, and Löwemon sacrifices himself to intercept the Darkness in Lucemon's attack. Koichi becomes a spirit, apologizes to his friends, and transfers the Spirits of Darkness to Koji before being scanned by Lucemon. Koji mourns his brother's loss, and their combined spirits, along with the Legendary Warrior Spirits, merge with Takuya and Koji to create Susanoomon.
49	"Lucemon on the Loose" ("Fight, Susanoomon – Lucemon Reaches the Human World"); Transliteration: "Tatakae Susanoomon, Rūchemon Ningenkai Tōtasu!!" (Japanese: 戦えスサノオモン ルーチェモン人間界到達!!)	March 23, 2003	July 13, 2003
Takuya and Koji fuse their Ten Legendary Warrior Spirits to become Susanoomon and they confront Lucemon, leading to a fierce battle, where Lucemon is defeated and purified by Susanoomon. However, his dark side remains and hatches into the malevolent Lucemon: Shadow Lord Mode. Unfazed, the group follows Lucemon to Earth and reflects on their personal growth during the journey, while Lucemon threatens the human world through electronic devices. The team attacks, but it proves ineffective and Lucemon strikes back with his "Tide of Despair."
50	"End of the Line" ("Go Beyond Time! A New Legend's Start"); Transliteration: "Toki o Koete! Arata na Densetsu no Hajimari" (Japanese: 時を越えて! 新たな伝説の始まり)	March 30, 2003	July 14, 2003
In the final battle against Lucemon, the group is initially overpowered. However, they are reminded of their unity and personal growth. With the support of their Digimon spirits and the guidance of Ophanimon, Seraphimon, and Cherubimon, they evolve into the formidable Susanoomon. The team identifies a vulnerability in Lucemon and reveals another form, Lucemon Larva, controlling him. They confront Lucemon, break his control, and destroy him, restoring the Digital World. With the Digital World stabilized, the group is forced to return home through a closing portal. Upon returning, they find Koichi in critical condition, but their D-Tectors heal him. The gang applies the lessons that they learned in the Digital World to lead better lives, and they vow to become better individuals.

== Volume DVDs ==
=== North American Release ===
New Video Group released a complete DVD box set release of Frontier on September 10, 2013. Like previous releases, it is an 8-disc, English dub collection.

== See also ==
- Digimon
