= List of Digimon Data Squad episodes =

Digimon Data Squad
- No. of episodes: 48

Release
- Original network: Fuji TV
- Original release: April 2, 2006 – March 25, 2007

Season chronology
- ← Previous; Digimon Frontier Next → Digimon Fusion (season 1)

This is a list of episodes from the anime series Digimon Data Squad. As it currently stands, Digimon Data Squad is the shortest series in the franchise to date, and ends with 48 episodes. The series ran in Japan on Fuji TV from April 2006 to March 2007, and in the United States on Jetix from October 2007 to November 2008.

This series uses two opening themes in the original and first and main Japanese version. "Gou-ing! Going! My Soul!" is used as the opening theme of the first half and the second opening song, "Hirari", is used in the remaining episodes.

== Episode list ==
No.	Title	Original release date	English air date
1	"There Are Monsters Among Us" ("I am Masaru! Cockatrimon Strikes"); Transliteration: "Ore ga Masaru da! Kokatorimon Shūrai" (Japanese: 俺が大だ!コカトリモン襲来)	April 2, 2006	October 1, 2007
Marcus Damon meets a dinosaur-like creature, Agumon. Yoshino Fujieda, a member of a government agency called DATS, is dispatched to capture Agumon. Marcus and Agumon hide in Tokyo Tower, but Yoshino finds them and takes Marcus to Commander Sampson. Commander Sampson explains that Agumon is a wild creature that can go out of control. Despite the risks, Marcus decides to take responsibility for Agumon's actions. A burger joint is attacked in the area where Agumon was hiding, but it turns out to be the work of Kokatorimon, not Agumon. Marcus becomes furious and punches Kokatorimon after discovering his incredible strength. A mysterious old fisherman gives Marcus a Digivice to channel his DNA and make Agumon stronger. Agumon Digivolves into GeoGreymon, defeating Kokatorimon and reverting him into a DigiEgg. Commander Sampson is impressed by Marcus and Agumon's capabilities.
2	"Marcus' Inner Strength" ("Burn, the Digisoul of Anger - The Flymon that Lurks in Darkness"); Transliteration: "Moero Ikari no Deji-sōru, Yami ni Hisomu Furaimon"" (Japanese: 燃えろ怒りのデジソウル 闇にひそむフライモン)	April 9, 2006	October 5, 2007
Marcus and Agumon are brought to DATS HQ by Yoshino, where they learn about the process of sending wild Digimon back to the Digital World using a teleporter. Marcus and Agumon escape from DATS HQ and decide to hide Agumon at Marcus's home. However, Agumon quickly befriends Marcus's family. Meanwhile, Marcus is annoyed to find out that Yoshino is keeping an eye on them. They investigate animal attacks at Kristy's school and discover that a Kunemon is responsible. During the battle, Marcus unlocks Agumon's DNA potential, leading to their victory. An old man tells Marcus about the Digital World, and he later joins DATS as a new member.
3	"The Return of Thomas!" ("Genius Tohma has Returned! Beat Meramon"); Transliteration: "Kaette Kita Tensai Tohma! Meramon wo Buttobase" (Japanese: 帰ってきた天才トーマ!メラモンをぶっとばせ)	April 16, 2006	October 8, 2007
Marcus and Agumon are called to deal with a DemiMeramon attack, but they struggle to defeat it due to its small size. Thomas H. Norstein returns from the Austria branch of DATS and captures DemiMeramon. Marcus and Thomas clash in both personality and a physical fight. They later discover that DemiMeramon's flames are causing problems around the city, and Thomas, with his partner Gaomon, defeats some of them. However, a few DemiMeramon are left at a chemical plant. Marcus finds inspiration from an old fisherman and has Agumon use his fire to merge and digivolve into Meramon. With this newfound strength, Marcus and GeoGreymon defeat the remaining DemiMeramon. In the end, Marcus and Thomas are assigned to work together, despite their differences
4	"The New Team of Marcus and Thomas!" ("The New Team's First Outing! Pursuit Drimogemon!"); Transliteration: "Shin-Chīmu Hatsu-shutsudō! Dorimogemon wo Oe!" (Japanese: 新チーム初出動!ドリモゲモンを追え!)	April 23, 2006	October 15, 2007
Marcus and Thomas are ordered to work together, but they aren't able to do so, which becomes clear during the pursuit of a group of Numemon. Suddenly a Drimogemon appears and helps two burglars steal money. Marcus and Thomas try to capture him, but because of their quarreling, he escapes to the Digital World. To capture him, Thomas decides to follow him, even against the orders of Commander Sampson.
5	"Digital World, Here We Come!" ("Rushing into the Digital World! Drimogemon's Trap"); Transliteration: "Dejitaru-wārudo Totsunyū! Dorimogemon no Wana" (Japanese: デジタルワールド突入! ドリモゲモンの罠)	April 30, 2006	October 22, 2007
Marcus and Thomas, together with their Digimon partners, enter the Digital World to capture Drimogemon. They fall into a large underground labyrinth, Drimogemon's home, and escape seems impossible. Thanks to Marcus' unconventional methods, they manage to leave the labyrinth on Drimogemon's back, but then, the wild Digimon evolves to Digmon.
6	"The Ultimate Team No More?" ("The Masaru-Agumon Combo Terminated?! Gale, Garurumon"); Transliteration: "Masaru Agumon Konbi Kaishō!? Shippū Garurumon" (Japanese: 大・アグモンコンビ解消!? 疾風ガルルモン)	May 7, 2006	October 29, 2007
Although Agumon and Marcus work well together to defeat a Tortomon, Agumon gets angry at Marcus after a comment of his and now hides in his Digivice. Meanwhile, an Elecmon wreaks havoc in the city, causing car crashes. Marcus tries to defeat him alone, but Elecmon Digivolves to a black Garurumon, which even Sunflowmon and Gaogamon can't defeat. Marcus and Agumon must work together again to beat this new threat.
7	"A Birthday Kristy Will Never Forget...." ("Tohma's Day off - Explosion, Bomber Nanimon"); Transliteration: "Tohma no Kyūjitsu, Bonbā-nanimon" (Japanese: トーマの休日 爆裂ボンバーナニモン)	May 14, 2006	November 5, 2007
It's Kristy's birthday and Marcus must attend supplementary exams to save his grades. Unable to be by his sister's side on this day, he asks Thomas to take his place. A Citramon, however, threatens to ruin everything.
8	"The Singer's Secret" ("Yoshino Gets Her Cinderella Story?! Chrysalimon's Shadow"); Transliteration: "Yoshino Tama-no-koshi Getto!? Kurisarimon no Kage" (Japanese: ヨシノ玉の輿ゲット!? クリサリモンの影)	May 21, 2006	November 12, 2007
Yoshi is dating a famous musician, Neon Hanamura, who is also her childhood friend. The real reason for her to approach him is because he is suspected of hiding a Keramon (who later digivolves into Kurisarimon), using him to bolster his career.
9	"Never Meet Your Heroes" ("Tohma's Inglorious Battle - Secret Maneuvers, Togemon"); Transliteration: "Tohma Eikō Naki Tatakai, An'yaku Togemon" (Japanese: トーマ栄光なき戦い 暗躍トゲモン)	May 28, 2006	November 19, 2007
A famous boxer has a fantastic comeback after being absent for some years because of an injury. Thomas is a great fan of his, and when rumors of him using a Digimon to help him in his fights start to spread, he investigates, determined to prove his innocence.
10	"Curse This Curse: Marcus' Bad Day" ("Masaru's Worst Day in His Life - Prankster Soulmon"); Transliteration: "Masaru Jinsei Saiaku no Hi, Itazura Sōrumon" (Japanese: マサル人生最悪の日 いたずらソウルモン)	June 4, 2006	November 26, 2007
Thomas invites Kristy, Marcus, and Agumon to his mansion for lunch. Marcus becomes the unfortunate victim of strange unexplained accidents. Agumon sees the culprit is a Soulmon, who is invisible to everybody else except for him. Marcus and the others do not pay attention to Agumon's warnings, and the pranks become more frequent and more dangerous.
11	"The Vile of Vilemon!" ("Recover the Bond between Parent and Child - Evilmon's Bewitchment"); Transliteration: "Oyako no Kizuna wo Torimodose, Ibirumon no Genwaku" (Japanese: 親子の絆を取り戻せ イビルモンの幻惑)	June 18, 2006	December 3, 2007
The owner of a store that specializes in baking white buns suddenly becomes addicted to gambling. For unknown reasons, he has consecutive winning streaks in every bet, all thanks to the prayers he has paid to a mysterious shrine. As the man sinks in his obsession for gambling, he neglects both his business and his own son. Touched by the boy's relationship with his father, Marcus sets out to speak reason to the man and discovers that he's under the influence of Vilemon and his DemiDevimon henchmen.
12	"The Digi-egg That Fell to Earth" ("I Will Protect Chika! Biyomon's Resolve"); Transliteration: "Chika wa Boku ga Mamoru! Piyomon no Ketsui" (Japanese: 知香はボクが守る! ピヨモンの決意)	June 25, 2006	December 10, 2007
Kristy's made a new friend, a Digimon called Biyomon. Although Marcus feels optimistic for his sister and consents to let Biyomon stay, he's later told that people can't keep a Digimon they've made a relationship with if they aren't DATS members!
13	"The Rise of RiseGreymon" ("Masaru's New Power - Evolve! RiseGreymon"); Transliteration: "Masaru Aratanaru Chikara, Shinka! Raizu-gureimon" (Japanese: マサル新たなる力 進化!ライズグレイモン)	July 2, 2006	December 17, 2007
Merukimon appears in the real world to prevent Falcomon from being defeated, defeating easily the DATS Digimon and reverting Biyomon to a Digi-egg in the process. In a desperate attempt to find his way back to Kristy after Merukimon revives him, Biyomon loses control and quickly evolves to Aquilamon and then into Garudamon, wreaking chaos over the city. The DATS and their Digimon feel helpless before the overwhelming power of the Ultimate Digimon. Frustrated at not being strong enough to protect the smiling faces of both his family and friends, Marcus lets out a cry that awakens the birth of a new DNA Charge that allows GeoGreymon to digivolve into his Ultimate form, RizeGreymon.
14	"The Wild Boy of the Digital World" ("Digimon Boy Ikuto - Forest Guardian, Jureimon"); Transliteration: "Dejimon Shōnen Ikuto, Mori no Ban'nin Jureimon" (Japanese: デジモン少年イクト 森の番人ジュレイモン)	July 9, 2006	January 7, 2008
To stop Merukimon's further assaults on the human world, DATS authorizes Yoshi, Thomas, and Marcus to be dispatched into the Digital World. Unfortunately, their presence does not go unnoticed by Merukimon and a mysterious shadow, who quickly ambushes the DATS after their arrival. The attacker turns out to be a ten-year-old boy named Keenan, who harbors an intense hatred for humans.
15	"The Gorge of Deception!" ("Recollections of my Mother - Howl, MachGaogamon"); Transliteration: "Kāsan no Omoide, Hoero Mahha-gaogamon" (Japanese: 母さんの想い出 吠えろマッハガオガモン)	July 23, 2006	January 14, 2008
As they wander further into the Digital World, the DATS stumble upon a ghost city which is home to a nest of Dokugumon. Without warning, the spider Digimon quickly trap the DATS and their partner Digimon, dragging them all into the depths below where their lord MetalPhantomon dwells. He casts the DATS into a world of endless nightmares and despair where their greatest fears take shape. After reliving a painful memory about his mother, Thomas' DNA awakens, granting Gaomon the power to digivolve into his Ultimate form, MachGaogamon.
16	"Falcomon: Friend or Foe?" ("The Ally is Falcomon?! Violent! Blossomon"); Transliteration: "Nakama wa Farukomon!? Mōretsu! Burossamon" (Japanese: 仲間はファルコモン!? モーレツ! ブロッサモン)	July 30, 2006	January 28, 2008
Yoshi's struck by a contagious virus which seemingly affects humans, though Digimon remain immune to its effects. With Marcus and Thomas gone for supplies and Lalamon alone nursing Yoshi, Keenan and Falcomon take advantage of the opportunity to get rid of the crippled DATS agent, only for the boy to become infected as well. Worried for the sake of Keenan, Falcomon strikes a deal with the other DATS to lead them to the whereabouts of a vaccine that lies in Wanderer's Cape that can counter the effects of the virus. Meanwhile, Gotsumon sends Blossomon to prevent the vaccine from being obtained.
17	"Yoshi's Biggest Battle: The One With Herself" ("The Singing Voice that Calls Upon a Miracle - The Lilamon Evolution"); Transliteration: "Kiseki wo Yobu Utagoe, Rairamon Shinka" (Japanese: 奇跡を呼ぶ歌声 ライラモン進化)	August 6, 2006	February 4, 2008
Yoshi has lost her battle confidence, feeling like she's always dragging down her companions. The group is caught up in an avalanche caused by Mammothmon, and Yoshi, Thomas, and Lalamon fall down to the bottom of a valley. To protect Yoshi and the wounded Thomas, Lalamon faces off against Mammothmon, not losing her fighting spirit. Yoshi swirls in despair until Lalamon sings a song to tame the beast that triggers an old memory from Yoshi's childhood of the time she and Lalamon met. Having restored faith in herself, Yoshi calls out her own DNA Charge to digivolve Lalamon to her Ultimate form, Lilamon.
18	"The Clash With Merukimon!" ("The DATS Team Annihilated?! Clash, Mercurimon"); Transliteration: "Dattsu-chīmu Zenmetsu!? Gekitotsu Merukurimon" (Japanese: DATSチーム全滅!? 激突メルクリモン)	August 13, 2006	February 11, 2008
After overcoming difficult hardships along their trek, the DATS finally arrive at Infinity Ice Ridge. To their surprise, the old man, Homer Yushima, is waiting for them near the entrance, leading them to a cave shortcut. Once inside, they make their way through a swarm of Tsumemon, and then against Keenan, who is bound to defeat the humans once and for all. However, Gotsumon betrays Keenan and takes the whole group hostage, except for Marcus, delivering them all before Merukimon. Saving Keenan from certain death, Marcus and Agumon hurry to Merukimon's palace for a final showdown.
19	"The Truth About Keenan" ("The Target is Ikuto!? Gotsumon's Plot"); Transliteration: "Hyōteki wa Ikuto!? Gotsumon no Takurami" (Japanese: 標的はイクト!?ゴツモンの企み)	August 20, 2006	February 18, 2008
Yushima's true identity as the commander of the Digital World exploration party, as well as the DATS chief, is revealed. With Yushima's help, Marcus, Keenan, and the others are able to return to the real world. However, they are forced to leave Yushima behind in the Digital World. Marcus makes a big uproar, trying to do all it takes to go save him, but the Digital Dive is frozen over. Sampson tells Marcus and Keenan about the incident that occurred ten years ago. To make matters worse, Merukimon's Gotsumon appears in the real world with three Okuwamon to target Keenan.
20	"The Crier Family Reunion" ("Rescue Mother, Ikuto - Hagurumon's Cage"); Transliteration: "Hahaoya wo Sukue, Ikuto, Hagurumon no Ori" (Japanese: 母親を救え、イクト ハグルモンの檻)	August 27, 2006	February 25, 2008
The DATS arrive at Dr. Crier's home, but Keenan runs away in shock and denial at the sight of his human mother. Drowned in his sorrowful thoughts, Keenan recalls his memories of Frigimon's death, which bring him grief. At the Crier's home, the Professor explains that his wife, Michelle, went into shock and a partially catatonic state after the search for Keenan in the Digital World confirmed his disappearance. Suddenly, an anomalous thunderstorm strikes the house, causing the digital gate to open up, and Hagurumon comes from it. He immediately takes over the house and transforms it into a bizarre, toy-robot-like creature with Michelle trapped inside.
21	"The Digimon Army Makes Its Move" ("Big Panic in the Human World - The Digimon Army Advances"); Transliteration: "Ningen-kai Dai-panikku, Dejimon Gundan Shingeki" (Japanese: 人間界大パニック デジモン軍団進撃)	September 3, 2006	March 3, 2008
Enraged that Merukimon has not taken proactive action to deal with the human problem, SaberLeomon dispatches a Digimon armada consisting of hundreds of Pteramon and Boarmon, led by Gotsumon, to the human world to destroy it. The DATS step in to contain the threat but are overwhelmed in numbers by the enemy, until the rest of the DATS staff enters the battlefield to help them in the fight. However, both sides are unaware that an unseen third party, lurking in the shadows, has had them all set up in a trap. (Note that Miki and Megumi's PawnChessmon digivolve to KnightChessmon in this episode.)
22	"The Wrath of SaberLeomon" ("Defeat the Ultimate Level! The Anger Wave of Saber Leomon"); Transliteration: "Taose Kyūkyoku-tai! Dotō Sāberu-reomon" (Japanese: 倒せ究極体! 怒涛サーベルレオモン)	September 10, 2006	March 10, 2008
The Digimon invasion was temporarily halted due to the efforts of a single man, Kurata, who Sampson knows and who gained the approval of Chief Hashiba. Understanding that Keenan has no place to go, Marcus invites him and Falcomon to stay at his home. Meanwhile, SaberLeomon himself realises in the human world and rampages at an oil refinery as a challenge to the DATS.
23	"One More Digital Dive" ("Once More, To the Digital World - Insekimon's Great Rampage"); Transliteration: "Futatabi, Dejitaru-wārudo e, Insekimon Ōabare" (Japanese: 再び、デジタルワールドへ インセキモン大暴れ)	September 17, 2006	March 24, 2008
Due to the widespread destruction that the Digimon caused in the city, DATS, acting on orders from the government ministry, dispatches the DATS agents, along with a troop unit, into the Digital World to defeat Merukimon once and for all. Thomas' suspicions about Kurata grow stronger when it is made known that the latter has been appointed leader of the mission. Meanwhile, Keenan still cannot gather himself to reconcile his Digimon feelings with his human identity, until Sarah's kind words encourage him and build his resolve to go into the Digital World and stop the war between Merukimon and DATS.
24	"The Past Revealed" ("The Revealed Past - Heartless! Gizmon: AT"); Transliteration: "Akasareru Kako, Hijō! Gizumon Ē-Tī" (Japanese: 明かされる過去 非情!ギズモン: ΑT)	September 24, 2006	March 31, 2008
Ten years ago, Frigimon found an abandoned human baby, Keenan, and took him as her son. An expedition led by Dr. Spencer Damon embarked into the Digital World to search for the lost baby but found itself threatened by wild Digimon. After a brief feud, Merukimon realized that Spencer was an honest man and they made a promise that both races would cooperate with each other in the future. However, Kurata became consumed with hatred for Digimon, deeming them all evil due to the attack. Merukimon recalls and denounces him as the man responsible for the deaths of Frigimon and many other Digimon.
25	"Kurata's Revenge" ("Smash Kurata's Ambition - Flight, Yatagaramon"); Transliteration: "Kurata no Yabō wo Kudake, Hishō Yatagaramon" (Japanese: 倉田の野望をくだけ 飛翔ヤタガラモン)	October 1, 2006	April 7, 2008
Kurata's true ambition is the total annihilation of the Digimon race, making it come about with the aid of his artificially made puppet Digimon Gizumon AT. The DATS and their Digimon partners fight back to no avail; however, Marcus refuses to give up. Fed up with Marcus' stubbornness, Kurata evolves Gizumon into its Ultimate form, Gizumon XT, to finish the DATS. As a dying act of courage, Merukimon sacrifices himself to teach Keenan that a world where humans' and Digimons' hearts become one is possible. Taking Merukimon's words and the happy memories spent with Marcus and the others to heart, Keenan's DNA explodes, allowing Falcomon to access his Ultimate digivolution, Crowmon.
26	"Memory Is The First Thing To Go!" ("Masaru's Memory is Erased - The Lost Bond"); Transliteration: "Masaru Kioku Shōkyo, Ushinawareta Kizuna" (Japanese: マサル記憶消去 失われた絆)	October 8, 2006	April 14, 2008
The DATS team returns to the real world, only to find that Sampson and the others are missing. Chief Hashiba surrounds them and dismisses them from DATS, since Kurata lied to the government, and the memories of Marcus, Thomas, and Yoshi are erased. The Digimon are held captive in a jail cell. The rest of the team are also in cells. Marcus, Thomas, and Yoshi live a normal life, until the Digimon escape and persuade them that they used to be a team. Marcus and the others don't believe this at first, but later regain their memories. Meanwhile, Keenan and the others escape from the cells and try to destroy Kurata, but to no avail. They group together again to defeat another Gizumon that Kurata had sent to attack Marcus. Afterwards, they head over to DATS headquarters to find that it's being destroyed.
27	"The Beginning of the End!" ("Chase Kurata - The Operation of Digimon Extermination Begins!"); Transliteration: "Kurata wo Oe, Dejimon Sen'metsu Sakusen Kaishi!" (Japanese: 倉田を追え・デジモン殲滅作戦開始!)	October 15, 2006	April 21, 2008
With DATS HQ destroyed and Kurata on his way to the Digital World, the DATS seek out Dr. Crier to ask him to reactivate his digital gate. When they go through, they end up running into Kurata's henchmen: Kouki, Nanami, and Ivan. When their Bio Digimon forms prove too powerful for the DATS to handle, Sampson and Kudamon appear to help out.
28	"Digivice Meltdown!" ("Evolution is Impossible! The Digivices Break Down"); Transliteration: "Shinka Fukanō! Dejivaisu Hōkai" (Japanese: 進化不可能!デジヴァイス崩壊)	October 22, 2006	April 28, 2008
The gang appears in the Digital World and head towards Cherrymon's forest for an information gathering. However, a swarm of Gizumon XT appear and overwhelm them. But the DATS members are saved by BanchoLeomon. He tells the group to "Search for power" and disappears. When they reach Cherrymon's forest, Kouki, Nanami, and Ivan attack.
29	"How to Fix a Broken Digivice" ("Resurrecting Digivices - A New Brilliance"); Transliteration: "Yomigaeru Dejivaisu, Aratanaru Kagayaki" (Japanese: よみがえるデジヴァイス・新たなる輝き)	October 29, 2006	May 5, 2008
Searching for Dr. Spencer Damon in hopes he can repair their Data Link Digivices, the Data Squad members stumble upon a gym where BanchoLeomon separates the humans from their Digimon partners to train them on the use of their D.N.A. Charges. However, Kouki, Nanami, and Ivan attack the Digimon in the meantime, while they are unable to advance past the Rookie level. Marcus, Thomas, and Yoshi must master their D.N.A. Charges in time to rescue their Digimon from destruction.
30	"Journey to the Sacred City" ("An Imprisoned Masaru - The Holy City's Trap"); Transliteration: "Toraware no Masaru, Seinaru To no Wana" (Japanese: とらわれの大 聖なる都の罠)	November 5, 2006	May 12, 2008
The DATS arrive at the Holy Capital, but once inside are quickly captured and placed in an arena for execution. There, they meet once again with an old acquaintance who they thought missing. Thankfully, the moment that Marcus displays his DNA, the Digimon set them free, as they realize Marcus is Spencer Damon's son who all remember him for his heroic deeds to them. Unfortunately, celebrations are short-lived when a squad of Gizumon comes to raid the city, but catastrophe is prevented thanks to the timely arrival of Keenan and Falcomon who return with allies.
31	"Showdown Between Geniuses: Thomas vs. Nanami!" ("Genius Showdown! Tohma vs. Nanami"); Transliteration: "Tensai Taiketsu! Tōma tai Nanami" (Japanese: 天才対決!トーマVSナナミ)	November 12, 2006	May 19, 2008
Both the DATS and the inhabitants of the Holy Capital are preparing for the impending battle. When news arrive that Kurata's camp has been discovered, Marcus takes the initiative to strike a head on assault, but Thomas disagrees since it may be a trap. However, Thomas feels underappreciated witnessing how all the Digimon support Marcus. The forces split with Marcus and Keenan going to engage Kurata while Yoshi and Thomas stay to protect the city. Nanami bio hybrid digivolves into BioLotusmon and makes her presence known to Thomas, seducing him in order to make him go astray from his mission.
32	"The Sacred City's Last Stand!" ("Fiercely Attack Kurata's Army Corps - Protect the Holy City"); Transliteration: "Mōkō Kurata Gundan, Seinaru To o Mamore" (Japanese: 猛攻倉田軍団 聖なる都を守れ)	November 19, 2006	June 16, 2008
Nanami managed to accomplish to drain all the water in the lake, where ElDoradimon rests, drained thus preventing any means of mobility to the Holy Capital. With the fortress's defenses down, Ivan directs a frontal assault but is soon detained by Yoshi and Rosemon. However, the two of them are in for a surprise when they witness that Ivan can bio hybrid digivolve further into BioSpinomon.
33	"The Final Bio-Hybrid Battle!" ("The Final Decisive Battle! Kouki, Ultimate Evolution"); Transliteration: "Saigo no Kessen! Kōki, Kyūkyoku Shinka" (Japanese: 最後の決戦!聖、究極進化)	November 26, 2006	June 23, 2008
By incapacitating ElDoradimons' movements, Kurata opened up a massive digital gate that sucks the titanic Digimon along with all his inhabitants to realise into the human world. Once more in the human world, Kouki challenges both Marcus and Agumon for a final showdown to determine the stronger fighter between both. Kouki surprises them by bio-digivolving into BioDarkDramon. Meanwhile, the other DATS and the Digimon citizens are busy fending off the Holy Capital from the intruding Gizumon. However, Kurata again outsmarts his foes ordering the Gizumon to initiate Operation Digital Hazard.
34	"The Norstein Family Secret" ("The Day of Parting - The Strongest Enemy: Tohma!"); Transliteration: "Ketsubetsu no Hi, Saikyō no Teki Tōma!" (Japanese: 訣別の日 最強の敵・トーマ!)	December 3, 2006	June 30, 2008
ElDradimon was annihilated by Kurata's Gizumon Javelin, and to complicate matters more, Thomas and Gaomon have mysteriously vanished. In fact, Thomas returned to his estranged father and sister, Relena, but the welcome is cold when Thomas' father presents his benefactor none other than Kurata. In exchange for treating Relena's illness, Kurata "persuades" Thomas to seal an agreement. The remaining DATS are desperately searching for any Digimon survivors, until Thomas appears and much to Marcus' shock and dismay, Thomas orders MirageGaogamon to fight against ShineGreymon.
35	"Kurata's Real Plan" ("The Power of Destruction - ShineGreymon Runs Wild"); Transliteration: "Hametsu no Pawā, Shaingureimon Bōsō" (Japanese: 破滅のパワー シャイングレイモン暴走)	December 10, 2006	July 7, 2008
Because Thomas has pledged allegiance to Kurata, Marcus' fueled with a feeling of deep rage in his heart to destroy his opponent at any cost that causes him to invoke a Dark-DNA Charge triggering on ShineGreymon to digivolve into Ruin Mode. Fortunately, Kristy arrives to stop Marcus, and he sees the error of his ways but is too late to stop ShineGreymon's rampage. Feeling hopeless, Marcus sheds tears streaming onto his digivice causing ShineGreymon to come into his senses and revert to a digi-egg.
36	"Awaken Belphemon" ("Demon Lord Belphemon Revives"); Transliteration: "Maō Berufemon Fukkatsu" (Japanese: 魔王ベルフェモン復活)	December 17, 2006	July 14, 2008
Kurata unleashes Belphemon on the city, causing Yoshi, Keenan, Miki, and Megumi to confront him. Thomas double-crosses Kurata, forcing him to become a pure DNA, and fires himself at Belphemon, who in turn transforms into Rage Mode. As Marcus races off with Agumon's Digi-egg in hand, can he make it time to assist the others?
37	"The Battle With Belphemon" ("Awaken, Agumon - Defeat Belphemon!"); Transliteration: "Mezameyo Agumon, Berufemon o Taose!" (Japanese: 目覚めよアグモン ベルフェモンを倒せ!)	December 24, 2006	July 21, 2008
The DATS team continues the fight against Kurata, who has merged himself with Belphemon Rage Mode, but the battle is going badly. From inside Belphemon, Kurata sneers and tells DATS that Digimon are lifeless bits of data without hearts or feelings. This enrages Keenan, and unlocks the power of his DNA charge. Falcomon digivolves to his Mega form Ravemon, but it is still not enough to stop Belphemon, whose true instincts emerge. Meanwhile, Marcus arrives with Agumon's Digi-egg and watches helplessly as his friends fight on. As Marcus watches helplessly, Belphemon regained his control over his body and attacks in a fury. He shoots straight at Marcus with his attack, only to be protected from the attack by Keenan and Ravemon who are badly injured by the attack. After this Marcus gains frustration at his friends getting hurt and Agumon decides to come in with a dramatic entrance.
38	"The Power of the Burst Mode" ("Burst Mode - The Power that Exceeds Ultimate"); Transliteration: "Bāsuto Mōdo, Kyūkyoku o Koeru Chikara" (Japanese: バーストモード 究極を超える力)	January 7, 2007	July 28, 2008
Kurata is alive within Belphemon, and he's filled with contempt for Marcus, Spencer, and their family. Kurata absorbs the city's electricity and plans to destroy everything. He swallows space-oscillation bombs to open a rift that could destroy both the human and digital worlds. Despite the bleak situation, Marcus inspires the DATS team, reminding them of their shared purpose. They launch a powerful attack on Belphemon, but it seems ineffective. When Marcus witnesses his Digimon friends protecting him, he gains the determination to defeat Kurata and Belphemon. This newfound determination triggers the miraculous digivolution of ShineGreymon into Burst Mode. They successfully destroy Belphemon, but Kurata triggers an explosion, creating a larger digital gate that ultimately consumes him. The collision between the Digital World and the Human World intensifies.
39	"King Drasil's Fatal Decision" ("Human World Terminated! Yggdrasil's Decision"); Transliteration: "Ningenkai Shōmetsu! Igudorashiru no Ketsudan" (Japanese: 人間界消滅!イグドラシルの決断)	January 14, 2007	August 4, 2008
Craniamon is briefed by King Drasil about all the events that occurred up to now while Marcus and the others protect the citizens from the onslaught of lightning from the Digital World. In addition, BanchoLeomon makes the ultimate sacrifice...
40	"The Royal Knights Assemble" ("The Strongest Order of Knights - The Royal Knights Gather"); Transliteration: "Saikyō Kishidan: Roiyaru Naitsu Shūketsu" (Japanese: 最強騎士団・ロイヤルナイツ集結)	January 21, 2007	August 11, 2008
As Marcus and the others make their way to the Digital World, they end up crashing into a shoreline. To their surprise, they find Gotsumon there, reborn and without his old memories. Gotsumon agrees to lead them to King Drasil, but along the way, they are attacked by Craniamon. He easily defeated ShineGreymon, MirageGaogamon, Ravemon, and Rosemon, showing them how powerful a Royal Knight is. ShineGreymon then evolved into his Burst Mode, but Gallantmon and the other Royal Knights show up and defeat him. King Drasil reveals himself, but Marcus, determined to not give up, throws a punch at him, only to find the shock of King Drasil's true identity: his own father, Spencer Damon.
41	"Father and Son Destiny" ("Confirm it with a Fist! Thoughts of My Father"); Transliteration: "Kobushi de Tashikamero! Tōsan no Omoi" (Japanese: 拳でたしかめろ!父さんの想い)	January 28, 2007	August 18, 2008
The DATS team arrives back in the human world, thanks to Sleipmon, who is none other than Commander Sampson's Kudamon. Gallantmon attacks the human world and makes short work of MirageGaogamon, Rosemon, Ravemon, RookChessmon, and BishopChessmon. Even armed with the Geo Grey Sword, ShineGreymon proves no match for the Royal Knight either. It is then that a badly injured Kentaurusmon challenges Gallantmon, but at what cost?
42	"Thomas Bursts on the Scene!" ("Toma's Determined Burst Mode"); Transliteration: "Tōma Ketsui no Bāsuto Mōdo" (Japanese: トーマ決意のバーストモード)	February 4, 2007	October 4, 2008
In order to learn Spencer's true intentions, Marcus and ShineGreymon head once again to the Digital World. However, Thomas and the others stay in the human world to fend off the Royal Knights' ongoing attack with LoadKnightmon this time directing the assault. In the battle, MirageGaogamon can't even touch the Royal Knight. Thomas must reconcile himself with his past in order to digivolve MirageGaogamon into his Burst Form.
43	"Justice Equals Power!" ("Indeed Strength is Justice! Beast Knight Duftmon"); Transliteration: "Chikara Koso Seigi! Jūkishi Dufutomon" (Japanese: 力こそ正義!獣騎士ドゥフトモン)	February 11, 2007	October 5, 2008
Biyomon returns to the Damon household with numerous Fresh and In-Training Digimon in tow. Yoshi and Keenan help out in taking care of them, despite all of the headache-inducing antics of the childish Digimon. Leopardmon, under the orders of King Drasil, attacks the real world nearby the Damon household. Rosemon and Ravemon do their best to stop the Royal Knight but fail. However, both go through Burst Digivolution and defeat Leopardmon once and for all.
44	"Human Potential" ("Break! Craniummon's Strongest Shield"); Transliteration: "Kudake! Kureniamumon no Saikyō no Tate" (Japanese: 砕け!クレニアムモンの最強の盾)	February 25, 2007	October 11, 2008
On their way to the Digital World's Mystic Tree where King Drasil resides, Marcus and Agumon are intercepted by Craniamon. He challenges Marcus to one last match, calling forth his true power in the form of his "Omni Shield," a defense mechanism that cannot be broken. As ShineGreymon Burst Mode and Marcus lay powerless to stop Craniammon, he is about to deal the final blow, the other DATS and their Digimon come to save them and join in the fight. They destroy Craniamon's shield by Marcus using his "human potential". Marcus proves to Craniamon that humans really do have potential. Craniamon lets them pass, knowing now that King Drasil's decision might not be the best one.
45	"A Family Quarrel!" ("The One-on-One Match Between Men! Masaru vs. Suguru"); Transliteration: "Otoko to Otoko no Taiman Shōbu! Masaru tai Suguru" (Japanese: 男と男のタイマン勝負!大VS英)	March 4, 2007	October 12, 2008
The DATS team climb King Drasil's headquarters, confronting odd crystals that repel their attacks. Leaving the others behind, Marcus, Agumon, and Gotsumon confront King Drasil. Meanwhile, Craniamon heads to the real world and confronts Garudamon and Kristy, who end up helping him out. Back in the Digital World, Marcus confronts King Drasil but is repelled by a force field. It is then that through the revelation of all his friends supporting him, Marcus overpowers King Drasil. Just as King Drasil lies defeated, Marcus tries to approach it but is interrupted by the sudden arrival of an old friend. With a twist of fate, BanchoLeomon was freed from the stone hold up, but Craniamon took its place. Then the most surprising news of all comes: King Drasil is just impersonating his father, BanchoLeomon is Marcus's father!
46	"The Truth About BanchoLeomon" ("Impact! The Truth About Bantiyou Leomon"); Transliteration: "Shōgeki! Banchōreomo no Shinjitsu" (Japanese: 衝撃!バンチョーレオモンの真実)	March 11, 2007	October 25, 2008
Craniamon freed BanchoLeomon and took over his place to hold the Digital World from falling onto the Human world. It is BanchoLeomon who stops Marcus from getting closer to King Drasil and reveals the stunning truth that it is in fact Spencer in the Digimon's body while his body is taken over by King Drasil. Spencer-BanchoLeomon tells the DATS team how during his past exploits in the Digital World, he met BanchoLeomon, both who become friends with their fists, and the truth about King Drasil's intentions because of Kurata's cruel actions. But King Drasil won't go down easily, so Spencer-BanchoLeomon holds him in place and asks Marcus to sacrifice him along with King Drasil to save the Human world. Marcus does so. Although it turns out that Spencer-BanchoLeomon's sacrifice was in vain, as King Drasil reappears in his true form.
47	"The Data Squad's Final Battle!" ("Protect the Future! DATS' Final Battle"); Transliteration: "Mirai o Mamore! Dattsu Saigo no Tatakai" (Japanese: 未来を守れ! DATS最後の戦い)	March 18, 2007	October 26, 2008
After BanchoLeomon and Spencer's destruction, King Drasil changes to a fighting mode and heads to the Real World to eliminate it. The DATS team follows and engages it in a furious clash, but King Drasil easily overpowers them all even at their Burst Digivolution stages. Fueled by their strong bond to protect their beloved ones, regardless of being Human or Digimon, the DATS all together rise their DNAs into the sky with a cry that is answered by the rest of the Digimon on earth and the Royal Knights. The Royal Knights rebel against King Drasil after doubting the motives of their god. In a shocking twist, King Drasil discloses that it is the computer which designs and controls all lifeforms in the Digital World at its will. Suddenly, he starts turning all the Digimon to digi-eggs. Then the Royal Knights try to help Craniamon hold up the Digital World. Everyone is about to go into the hardest battle they will face.
48	"The Ultimate Farewell!" ("A Complete Conclusion! Farewell, Leader of Fights"); Transliteration: "Kanzen Ketchaku! Saraba Kenka Banchō" (Japanese: 完全決着!さらばケンカ番長)	March 25, 2007	November 1, 2008
People from all over town, both adults and children, unite with Digimon to answer DATS' call for help. With their collective will, Marcus and Agumon activate Burst Mode, delivering the decisive blow to defeat King Drasil. King Drasil concedes defeat, recognizing the potential for growth in humans and Digimon as long as they work together. The collision between the human and digital worlds comes to a halt thanks to the power of everyone's combined DNA charges. However, the Digimon must return to help rebuild the Digital World, leading to a bittersweet parting. Marcus, determined not to be separated from Agumon, decides to accompany him to the Digital World. Five years later, Kristy and Keenan are attending middle school together, Thomas receives the Nobel Prize for curing Relena's illness, and Yoshi becomes a police officer along with Megumi, Miki, and Commander Sampson. Marcus and Agumon have taken on the role of peacemakers in the Digital World.

== Volume DVDs ==
=== North American Release ===
New Video Group released a complete DVD box set release on March 11, 2014. Like previous releases, it is an 8-disc, English dub collection.

== Notes ==
- Starting from episode 30, a new opening sequence is used. This is the first time, in any Digimon series, that a second, completely different, opening sequence is used. The second opening features the DATS in their new attire, the Digivice Burst using the Air Signal, Ikuto and Falcomon, the Royal Knights, Masaru's father, BanchoLeomon, Masaru's dogtag enlarged, and heavily features the Mega leveled Digimon in action.
