= Digimon Frontier =

2002 Japanese television series

- デジモンフロンティア
- Genre: Adventure, fantasy
- Created by: Akiyoshi Hongo
- Developed by: Sukehiro Tomita
- Directed by: Yukio Kaizawa
- Music by: Takanori Arisawa
- Country of origin: Japan
- Original language: Japanese
- No. of episodes: 50 (list of episodes)

Production
- Production companies: Fuji Television; Yomiko Advertising; Toei Animation

Original release
- Network: Fuji Television
- Release: April 7, 2002 – March 30, 2003

Related
- Film
- Digimon Frontier: Island of Lost Digimon (2002)
- Digimon franchise
- Digimon Adventure; Digimon Adventure 02; Digimon Adventure tri.; Digimon Tamers; Digimon Data Squad (Savers); Digimon Fusion (Xros Wars); Digimon Universe: App Monsters; Digimon Adventure (2020); Digimon Ghost Game; Digimon Beatbreak

Digimon Frontier (Japanese: デジモンフロンティア, Hepburn: Dejimon Furontia) is the fourth anime television series in the Digimon franchise, produced by Toei Animation. Unlike the previous series, the main characters can merge with ancient spirits known as the "Legendary Warriors" to become Digimon themselves.

The series aired in Japan from April 2002 to March 2003. An English-language version, produced by Sensation Animation, was broadcast in North America from September 2002 to July 2003 as the fourth and final season of Digimon: Digital Monsters.

== Synopsis ==
=== Setting ===
In the events prior to the series, ten Digimon creatures from the "Digital World", a parallel universe originated from Earth's various communication networks, sacrificed themselves to seal Lucemon. These Digimon, collectively known as the "Ten Legendary Warriors", created artifacts from their data: the twenty "Spirits" (ten Human and Beast Spirits for the elements of fire, light, wind, ice, thunder, earth, wood, water, metal and darkness), before leaving the Digital World in the care of three Celestial Digimon, Ophanimon, Cherubimon and Seraphimon. When Cherubimon betrays them, Ophanimon summons six children from the human world into the Digital World to become the "DigiDestined".

=== Plot ===
Takuya, Koji, Zoe, J.P., and Tommy are among several children who receive a text message inviting them to board a train at Shibuya Station. The train brings them to the Digital World. While exploring, the five gain the ability of Spirit Evolution, where they are able to transform into ancient Digimon warriors and meet two guided Digimon named Bokomon and his dim witted sidekick, Neemon. In addition, their cell phones have turned into a type of Digivice (digital device) known as a D-Tector, which they can also purify defeated Digimon by scanning them.

While exploring, the Legendary Warriors learn from Seraphimon that he, Ophanimon, and Cherubimon once maintained order among the human and beast-type Digimon, until Cherubimon became corrupted and urged the rest of the beast-type Digimon to engage with the human-type Digimon in a war. During this time, the Legendary Warriors are forced to fight five other ancient Digimon warriors, one of which Koji learns is his estranged twin brother, Koichi, who was corrupted into Duskmon. Koji manages to purify Koichi, allowing him to join them on their quest to defeat Cherubimon. They rescue Ophanimon while Cherubimon attacks them, but she sacrifices herself to save them and upgrades Takuya and Koji's D-Tectors with the last of her strength to allow them the ability of Unity Spirit Evolution.

After defeating Cherubimon, the DigiDestined learn that Lucemon is sealed within the Digital World's core, and a guide named Baronmon, warns the six Digidestined that the prophecy is that Lucemon will be revived. Two Royal Knights, Dynasmon and Crusadermon, are summoned by Lucemon, and steal all of the world's data to awaken him. The kids attempt to stop the evil knights from scanning the entire digital world, but they fail as they finally free Lucemon. After Takuya and Koji defeat the knights, Lucemon kills them for their failure and absorbs their data to Digivolve into his Chaos Mode. Koichi is revealed to be a digital shade - his physical body is unconscious in the real world after a dangerous fall. Lucemon destroys Koichi's digital form and absorbs his data, which enrages Takuya and allows all the spirits to combine into the ultimate Legendary Warrior Digimon Susanoomon. Though initially defeated, Lucemon Digivolves into his Shadowlord Mode, and arrives in the real world. After reviving Ophanimon, Cherubimon and Seraphimon, Susanoomon successfully destroys Lucemon, restoring the data and the Digital World. The children return to the real world and realize that an hour has not passed since their original departure, and save Koichi by using the power of their D-Tectors, which then revert into cell phones. Takuya and his friends then embrace their future.

== Characters ==
=== Main characters ===
Takuya Kanbara (神原 拓也, Kanbara Takuya)
Voiced by: Junko Takeuchi (Japanese); Michael Reisz (TV series, episodes 1–50), Dave Wittenberg (Island of the Lost Digimon) (English)
The leader of the group who uses the Human Spirit of Fire to become salamander-armored Agni-themed Agunimon (アグニモン, Agunimon), the Vritra-inspired bird of prey/dragon-themed Beast Spirit of Fire to become BurningGreymon (ヴリトラモン, Vuritoramon), and the Hybrid Spirit of Fire to become Aldamon (アルダモン, Arudamon). The combined spirits allow him to transform him into EmperorGreymon (カイゼルグレイモン, Kaizerugureimon). Takuya also appeared in the third and final season of Digimon Fusion.
Koji Minamoto (源 輝二, Minamoto Kōji)
Voiced by: Hiroshi Kamiya (Japanese); Steve Staley (English)
A loner and one of Takuya's friends who uses the Human Spirit of Light to become the wolf-armored Lobomon (ヴォルフモン, Vorufumon), the Beast Spirit of Light to become the Garmr-themed KendoGarurumon (ガルムモン, Garumumon), and the Hybrid Spirit of Light to become BeoWolfmon (ベオウルフモン, Beōrufumon). The combined spirits allow him to transform him into MagnaGarurumon (マグナガルルモン, Magunagarurumon).
Zoe Orimoto (織本 泉, Orimoto Izumi)
Voiced by: Sawa Ishige (Japanese); Michelle Ruff (English)
The only female member of the group who uses the Human Spirit of Wind to become the fairy-themed Kazemon (フェアリモン, Fearimon), and the Beast Spirit of Wind to become the Zephyrus/bird woman-themed Zephyrmon (シューツモン, Shūtsumon).
J.P. Shibayama (柴山 純平, Shibayama Junpei)
Voiced by: Masato Amada (Japanese); Steven Blum (English)
The oldest of the group who uses the Human Spirit of Thunder to become the Hercules beetle-themed Beetlemon (ブリッツモン, Burittsumon), and the Beast Spirit of Thunder to become the Hercules beetle/tank-themed MetalKabuterimon (ボルグモン, Borugumon).
Tommy Himi (氷見 友樹, Himi Tomoki)
Voiced by: Kumiko Watanabe (Japanese); Brianne Siddall (English)
The youngest of the group who uses the Human Spirit of Ice to become the small polar bear-themed Kumamon (チャックモン, Chakkumon), and the Beast Spirit of Ice to become the bear-faced Yeti-themed Korikkakumon (ブリザーモン, Burizāmon).
Koichi Kimura (木村 輝一, Kimura Kōichi)
Voiced by: Kenichi Suzumura (Japanese); Crispin Freeman (English)
Koji's twin brother, whose existence was kept from one another after their parents' divorce. After arriving at the Digital World, he is manipulated by Cherubimon. He uses a Human Spirit to transform into Duskmon (ダスクモン, Dasukumon) and a Beast Spirit to transform into the Hræsvelgr-themed Velgemon (ベルグモン, Berugumon). Once Koichi reforms, he uses the Human Spirit of Darkness to become the black lion-armored Löwemon (レーベモン, Rēbemon), and the Beast Spirit of Darkness to become the black lion-themed JägerLöwemon (カイザーレオモン, Kaizāreomon).
Bokomon (ボコモン, Bokomon)
Voiced by: Kazuko Sugiyama (Japanese); Brian Beacock (English)
A Digimon befriended by the DigiDestined that wears a haramaki. He would carry a book that contains information on different Digimon and locations.
Neemon (ネーモン, Nēmon)
Voiced by: Masami Kikuchi (Japanese); Michael Sorich (English)
A yellow rabbit-themed Digimon in baggy pants who serves as the group's comedy relief.

=== Trailmon Family ===
The Trailmon (トレイルモン, Torērumon) Family are a group of train-themed Digimon that serve as a mode of transportation across the Digital World. There are different kinds of Trailmon and most of them occasionally partake in the Great Trailmon Race. The following Trailmon are listed in order of appearance:

Trailmon (Worm) (トレイルモン（ワーム）, Torērumon (wāmu))
Voiced by: Eiji Yanagisawa, Takashi Nagasako (Japanese); Dave Wittenberg (English)
An earthworm/train-themed Digimon who was the first Trailmon seen.
Trailmon (Angler) (トレイルモン（アングラー）, Torērumon (angurā))
Voiced by: Hitoshi Bifu, Daisuke Ishikawa (Japanese); Dave Wittenberg (English)
An anglerfish/train-themed Digimon.
Trailmon (Franken) (トレイルモン（フランケン）, Torērumon (furanken))
Voiced by: Yoshikazu Nagana (Japanese); Dave Wittenberg (English)
A Frankenstein's monster/train-themed Digimion.
Trailmon (Buffalo) (トレイルモン（バッファロー）, Torērumon (baffarō)
Voiced by: Tomoyuki Shimura (Japanese); Dave Wittenberg (English)
A buffalo/train-themed Digimon.
Trailmon (Kettle) (トレイルモン（ケトル）, Torērumon (ketoru))
Voiced by: Daisuke Sakaguchi (Japanese); Dave Wittenberg (English)
A kettle/train-themed Digimon.
Trailmon (Mole) (トレイルモン（モール）, Torērumon (mōru))
Voiced by: Romi Park, Satomi Arai (Japanese); Dave Wittenberg (English)
A Japanese mole/train-themed Digimon.
Trailmon (Raccoon Dog) (トレイルモン（ラクーンドッグ）, Torērumon (rakūndoggu))
Voiced by: Masaaki Ishikawa (Japanese); Dave Wittenberg (English)
A raccoon dog/train-themed Digimon.
Dark Trailmon (闇のトレイルモン, Yami no torērumon)
Voiced by: Kouji Ishii (Japanese); Dave Wittenberg (English)
A dark and mysterious train-themed Digimon with red lights.
Trailmon (Ball) (トレイルモン（ボール）, Torērumon (bōru))
A ball-shaped train-themed Digimon whose arms are attached to the cranks. It only appeared in "Island of the Lost Digimon".

=== Antagonists ===
Cherubimon (ケルビモン, Kerubimon)
Voiced by: Ryūzaburō Ōtomo (Cherubimon), Rumi Shishido (Lopmon) (Japanese); Paul St. Peter (Cherubimon), Michelle Ruff (Lopmon) (English)
A Celestial rabbit/cherub-themed Digimon alongside Seraphimon and Orphanimon. He was corrupted by Lucemon. The Digidestined are called to the Digital World to stop Cherubimon and restore peace to the land. In a final battle with the Digidestined, Takuya Kanbara as EmperorGreymon defeats Cherubimon. He is later reborn as the rabbit-themed Lopmon (ロップモン, Roppumon) near the end of the series. In the final episode, the redeemed Cherubimon helps the DigiDestined by joining Ophanimon and Seraphimon in giving them the motive to destroy Lucemon.
Lucemon (ルーチェモン, Rūchemon)
Voiced by: Kumiko Nishihara, Ryusei Nakao (Japanese); Mona Marshall (English)
A prideful, evil Lucifer-themed Digimon and the main antagonist of the series. Lucemon was once a benevolent ruler who brought peace to the Digital World, but became corrupted by his own power and turned into a tyrant. The Ten Legendary Warriors came together to defeat Lucemon and locked him away in the core of the Digital World. Lucemon was able to corrupt Cherubimon and used him to gather the data of the Digital World so that he could be released. Revealed as the true antagonist after Cherubimon's defeat, Lucemon released the Royal Knights to finish his work. Upon his release, Lucemon proved to be more than a match for the DigiDestined until Takuya and Koji formed Susanoomon and apparently destroyed Lucemon. However, Lucemon rose again, but as the fallen angel-themed Lucemon Chaos Mode with both bird and bat-like wings on either side of his body. That is because Susanoomon only succeeded in scanning his good data. During the fight, Lucemon Chaos Mode assumed the form of the dragon-themed Lucemon Shadowlord Mode. With the encouragement of their friends, the DigiDestined formed together into Susanoomon who destroyed Lucemon Shadowlord Mode. However, the larva-themed Lucemon Larva, which contained Lucemon's consciousness and resided in the dark energy sphere carried in Lucemon Shadowlord Mode, survived and attempted a sneak attack. The spirits of the Ten Legendary Warriors emerged from Susanoomon to destroy Lucemon Larva once and for all with the core sword of Susanoomon's cannon. Lucemon has no form of a DigiEgg.
Murmukusmon (ムルムクスモン, Murumukusumon)
Murmukusmon Voiced by: Ken Yamaguchi (Japanese); Bob Papenbrook (English)
Darcmon Voiced by: Takako Uehara (Japanese); Tara Platt (English)
HippoGryphonmon Voiced by: Hikaru Midorikawa (Japanese); Wally Wingert (English)
A murmur-themed Digimon who is the main antagonist of "Island of the Lost Digimon". When fooling the Lost Island's human-based Digimon and beast-based Digimon upon having been banished there, Murmukusmon posed as Joan of Arc-themed Darcmon (ダルクモン, Darukumon) who led the Human Digimon and the Hippogriff-themed HippoGryphonmon (ヒポグリフォモン, Hipogurifomon) when leading the Beast Digimon. When the Legendary Warriors ended up on the Lost Island, they grew suspicious when neither Darcmon and HippoGryphonmon weren't seen together. When this was exposed, Murmukusmon sheds his disguise and uses the Fractal Codes from the different battles to revive Ornismon. He was destroyed by Agunimon.
Ornismon (オニスモン, Onisumon)
An ancient bird-themed Digimon who was sealed away on the Lost Island by AncientGreymon and AncientGarurumon. When he was banished to the Lost Island, Murmukusmon set the Human Digimon and Beast Digimon against each other to harvest the Fractal Codes needed to revive Ornismon. Once that was done, Murmukusmon used Ornismon as a mount. The spirits of AncientGreymon and AncientGarurumon appear upon answering Kotemon's prayers as they destroy Ornismon.

==== Corrupted Legendary Warriors ====
These are the Human Spirits and the Beast Spirits of the other Legendary Warriors that were possessed by Cherubimon and given to his unknown minions. Duskmon was originally part of this group. Each one was defeated by the DigiDestined and freed Cherubimon's control. During the fight against the Royal Knights, the DigiEggs that were originally associated with these Human and Beast Spirits were briefly reunited and helped to fight off the Royal Knights. The Human and Beast Spirits were part of Susanoomon's final attack on Lucemon Larva.

Grumblemon (グロットモン, Gurottemon)
Voiced by: Tomohiro Nishimura (Japanese); Derek Stephen Prince (English)
A troll/gnome-themed Digimon who is the Human Spirit of Earth. His Beast Spirit form is the troll/giant-themed Gigasmon (ギガスモン, Gigasumon). After losing his Gigasmon form to BurningGreymon, Grumblemon was slain by MetalKabuterimon.
Arbormon (アルボルモン, Aruborumon)
Voiced by: Kenji Nomura (Japanese); Richard Cansino (English)
A wooden cyborg-themed Digimon who is the Human Spirit of Wood. His Beast Spirit form is the plant dragon-themed Petaldramon (ペタルドラモン, Petarudoramon). After the DigiDestined combine their attacks to defeat Petaldramon with Lobomon claiming that Beast Spirit, Duskmon arrived and slew Arbormon while absorbing his Human Spirit.
Ranamon (ラーナモン, Rānamon)
Voiced by: Haruhi Nanao (Japanese); Peggy O'Neal (English)
A Naiad-themed Digimon with fish fin-like ears who is the Human Spirit of Water. Her Beast Spirit form is the sea witch-themed Calmaramon (カルマーラモン, Carumāramon), who possesses a squid-like lower body. She is vain and has admirers of her Human Spirit form, but is upset by the repulsiveness her Beast Spirit. Ranamon becomes Zoe's rival in battle. During the final battle in Sakkakumon, she is slain in her Calmaramon form by Zephyrmon.
Mercurymon (メルキューレモン, Merukyūremon)
Voiced by: Yasunori Masutani (Japanese); Daran Norris (English)
A humanoid mirror-themed Digimon with mirror shields who is the Human Spirit of Steel. His Beast Spirit form is the sefirot-themed Sakkakumon (セフィロトモン, Sefirotomon) who has a pocket dimension in each of his spheres with the head being where Mercurymon operates. When fighting Takuya in the Light Sphere, Mercurymon merged with Seraphimon's data to become ShadowSeraphimon (ブラックセラフィモン, Burakkuserafimon) who sports ten purple demonic wings. Takuya's Aldamon form was able to defeat ShadowSeraphimon in the Light Sphere and Mercurymon in the Steel Sphere. His Sakkakumon form was slain by Aldamon, Kazemon, Beetlemon, and Kumamon when they attacked the Light Sphere that turned out to be his weak spot.

==== Cherubimon's Army ====
The following Digimon are Digimon that were corrupted by Cherubimon into serving him:

Cerberumon (ケルベロモン, Keruberomon)
Voiced by: Fumihiko Tachiki (Japanese); Steve Kramer (English)
A Cerberus-themed Digimon that attacked by the Flame Terminal. Defeated by Agunimon who purified him as Cerberumon regressed to a DigiEgg that flew off. The Fractal Code claimed by Takuya restored the Flame Terminal.
Mushroomon (マッシュモン, Masshumon)
Mushroom Voiced by: Yoshikazu Nagano, Masahito Yabe (Japanese); Brian Donovan, Neil Kaplan, Paul St. Peter (English)
Woodmon Voiced by: Hiroaki Ishikawa (Japanese); Neil Kaplan (English)
Three mushroom-themed Digimon that used to reside in the Breezy Village until they were corrupted by Cherubimon and caused trouble for the local Floramon. When Zoe first became Kazemon, she held her ground against the Mushroomon until they stood on each other and merged into one giant wood-themed Woodmon (ウッドモン, Uddomon). Despite Kazemon's best efforts, she was defeated by Woodmon and Lobomon took over. Woodmon was defeated by Lobomon and took its Fractal Code enough to purify the Mushroomon.
ShadowToyAgumon (トイアグモン（黒）, Toiagumon (kuro))
Voiced by: Makikoo Omoto (Japanese); Bob Papenbrook (Lead ShadowToyAgumon), Derek Stephen Prince (ShadowToyAgumon), Dave Mallow (ToyAgumon (English)
The ShadowToyAgumon are Tyrannosauridae/construction set-themed Digimon that were originally ToyAgumon (トイアグモン, Toiagumon) until they were corrupted by Cherubimon. They took over Toy Country and their leader turned a Monzaemon into WaruMonzaemon. Once the ShadowToyAgumon are purified back into their ToyAgumon form by Agunimon and Lobomon, their spell on Monzaemon was undone and one ToyAgumon piloted a toy airplane to drop Takuya, Koji, and Tommy to the Forest Terminal.
Bakumon (バクモン, Bakumon)
Voiced by: Hiroomi Sugino (Japanese); Crispin Freeman (English)
A tapir/Baku-themed Digimon corrupted by Cherubimon and lacking its holy rings. It caused trouble for the Legendary Warriors in the TV Forest by giving them nightmares. Agunimon defeated Bakumon and purified him. Afterwards, Bakumon thanked the Legendary Warriors and gave them good dreams.
Golemon (ゴーレモン, Gōremon)
Voiced by: Michael McConnohie
Grumblemon can open a special container to enable a spell to create an army of golem-themed Digimon. One Golemon was created and accompanied Grumblemon in his attack on the Fortuneteller Village. It was destroyed by BurningGreymon. When he and Arbormon followed the Legendary Warriors into a Blue Cave, Grumblemon made more Golemon to attack them. While most of the Golemon were defeated, the remaining ones and Grumblemon were defeated when J.P. became MetalKabuterimon for the first time.
Toucanmon (トーカンモン, Tōkanmon)
Voiced by: Yūsuke Oguri, Ryō Naitō, Norihisa Mori, Nobuaki Kanemitsu (Japanese); Jerry Gelb, R. Martin Klein, Brad MacDonald, Mona Marshall (English)
Four toucan-themed Digimon that are members of Ranamon's fan club and proprietors of a beach front called the Toucan Paraside. While the boys were swimming in the ocean, the Toucanmon stole their D-Tectors where they are unable to make off with Zoe's D-Tector. When Ranamon fought Kazemon and became Calmaramon for the first time, the Toucanmon were disgusted by Calmaramon's appearance and fled. After briefly landing on Goma Island, two of the Toucanmon continued on to the Autumn Leaf Fair where they sold the D-Tectors to Datamon. After interrogating the two Toucanmon that fled back to the Toucan Paradise, Arbormon caught the other two Toucanmon that fled Tommy after they were ejected from a Trailmon and took them prisoner when confronting Datamon. During Tommy's fight with Arbormon the moment he reclaimed his D-Tector, the two Toucanmon fled. Sometime later, all four Toucanmon were at the Autumn Leaf Fair where they turned over a new leaf and aided the Legendary Warriors in constructing a snow catapult. They were later evacuated.
Chameleonmon (カメレモン, Kameremon)
Voiced by: Daisuke Ishikawa (Japanese); Richard Epcar (English)
A group of chameleon-themed Digimon that work for Petaldramon and raided the Hamburger Village to claim its hamburgers. One Burgermon was taken captive to make hamburgers for Petaldramon. When the Chameleonmon liked Tommy's hamburgers, they took him, J.P. and Zoe captive. A fight broke out between the Chameleonmon and Kumamon, Beetlemon, and Kazemon. After being frozen by Kumamon, they were purified by him and regressed back to the armadillo-themed Armadillomon (アルマジモン, Arumajimon) who fled.
Volcamon (ボルケーモン, Borukēmon)
Voiced by: Kensuke "Pile Volcano" Ōta (Japanese); Tom Wyner (English)
A volcano-themed Digimon who was the guardian of Sakkakumon's Earth Sphere. When fighting Beetlemon, he sews the seeds of doubt. Upon Volcamon being defeated by Beetlemon and disappearing upon his Fractal Code being scanned, his words affect Beetlemon enough for ShadowBeetlemon to appear.
Asuramon (アシュラモン, Ashuramon)
Voiced by: Kiyoyuki Sanada (Japanese); Bob Papenbrook (English)
A three-faced Asura-themed Digimon who was the guardian of Sakkakumon's Fire Sphere. When he attacked Tommy, he quickly assumed a hooded robe when masquerading as someone who fought off Asuramon. Asuramon acted overfriendly and wanted Tommy to give him his Spirits in recompense. When the ruse was exposed, Tommy became Kumamon and fought Asuramon before Slide-Evolving into Korikakumon. Upon him being defeated and having his Fractal Code claimed by Tommy, Asuramon shifted to his yellow happy face before disappearing.
Karatenmon (カラテンモン, Karatenmon)
Voiced by: Hiroshi Takahashi (Japanese); Kirk Thornton (English)
A karasu-tengu-themed Digimon who was the guardian of Sakkakumon's Wind Sphere. A master tactician, he messed with Koji upon reading his heart. After some difficulty fighting Karatenmon as Lobomon, he Slide-Evolved into KendoGarurumon and defeated Karatenmon. As his Fractal Code was being scanned, Karatenmon quoted "You forced yourself to be alone" and then disappeared.
Honeybeemon (ハニービーモン, Hanībīmon)
Voiced by: Yūsuke Oguri, Norihisa Mori, Ryō Naitō (Japanese); Richard Cansino, R. Martin Klein, Derek Stephen Prince (English)
A trio of honey bee-themed Digimon who are members of Ranamon's fan club who assisted her in Sakkakumon's Water Sphere. They became enamored with Zoe, but reluctantly remained loyal to Ranamon out of fear, despite being repulsed by Calamaramon, the latter's B-spirit form. The Honeybeemon defected upon Ranamon's defeat and flew Zoe out of Sakkakumon where they planned to make a fan club dedicated to her.
Parrotmon (パロットモン, Parottomon)
Voiced by: Beau Billingslea
A humanoid parrot-themed Digimon who was the guardian of Sakkakumon's Thunder Sphere. He was easily defeated by Agunimon and had its Fractal Code scanned before disappearing.
Cherrymon (ジュレイモン, Jureimon)
Voiced by: Dave Wittenberg
A cherry tree-themed Digimon who was the guardian of Sakkakumon's Wood Sphere. He was easily defeated by Beetlemon and had its Fractal Code scanned before disappearing.
IceLeomon (パンジャモン, Panjamon)
Voiced by: Paul St. Peter
A lion man-themed Digimon that resembles a white version of Leomon who was the guardian of Sakkakumon's Ice Sphere. Agunimon tries to reason with IceLeomon that he is being controlled to no avail leading to Agunimon to defeat IceLeomon and scan his Fractal Code before disappearing.
Phantomon (ファントモン, Fantomon)
Voiced by: Keijin Okuda, Kazunari Kojima (Japanese); Michael Sorich, Dave Wittenberg (English)
Two phantom/Grim Reaper-themed Digimon who served as the gatekeepers of Cherubimon's Castle. They trapped the Legendary Warriors in their crystal before they were tricked into crashing into each other by Löwemon. Once Löwemon had defeated the Phantomon and scanned their Fractal Code enough for them to regress back to DigiEggs, his teammates were freed enabling them to enter Cherubimon's Castle.

==== Royal Knights ====
The Royal Knights are servants of Lucemon who collect and send data to order to free him from his imprisonment. They are motivated by the belief they will be rewarded with the key to the human world, which they intend to conquer and rule. Though both of them were slain by EmperorGreymon and MagnaGarurumon, their data is absorbed by Lucemon before they could be purified.

Crusadermon (ロードナイトモン, Rōdonaitomon)
Voiced by: Ryōtarō Okiayu (Japanese); Melodee Spevack (English)
A crusader-themed Digimon and member of the Royal Knights.
Dynasmon (デュナスモン, Dyunasumon)
Voiced by: Kenta Miyake (Japanese); Derek Stephen Prince (English)
A humanoid dragon/wyvern-themed Digimon.

=== Ancient Legendary Warriors ===
The Ancient Legendary Warriors were a group of Digimon who fought Lucemon in the past and sealed him away in the Digital World's core. Their spirits were split into the different H-Spirits and B-Spirits that help make up their modern counterparts.

AncientGreymon (エンシェントグレイモン, Enshentogurēmon)
A quadrupedal dragon/bird of prey-themed Digimon who was the source of Agunimon and BurningGreymon. He was briefly revived in "Island of the Lost Digimon" to help fight Ornismon.
AncientGarurumon (エンシェントガルルモン, Enshentogarurumon)
A humanoid wolf-themed Digimon who was the source of Lobomon and KendoGarurumon. He was briefly revived in "Island of the Lost Digimon to help fight Ornismon.
AncientKazemon (エンシェントイリスモン, Enshentoirisumon)
An Iris-themed Digimon who was the source of Kazemon and Zephyrmon.
AncientBeetlemon (エンシェントビートモン, Enshentobītomon)
A Japanese rhinoceros beetle-themed Digimon emerging from the back of a red stag beetle who was the source of Beetlemon and MetalKabuterimon.
AncientMegatheriummon (エンシェントメガテリウモン, Enshentomegateriumon)
A multi-legged Pelorovis-themed Digimon with long braided fur who was the source of Kumamon and Korikakumon.
AncientSphinxmon (エンシェントスフィンクモン, Enshentosufinkumon)
A Sphinx-themed Digimon who was the source of Löwemon and JägerLöwemon.
AncientVolcamon (エンシェントボルケーモン, Enshentoborukēmon)
A humanoid volcano-themed Digimon who was the source of Grumblemon and Gigasmon.
AncientTroiamon (エンシェントトロイアモン, Enshentotoroiamon)
A cannon-covered Trojan Horse-themed Digimon who was the source of Arbormon and Petaldramon.
AncientMermaidmon (エンシェントマーメイモン, Enshentomāmēmon)
A blue mermaid-themed Digimon who was the source of Ranamon and Calmaramon.
AncientWisemon (エンシェントワイズモン, Enshentowaizumon)
A large ornamental mirror-themed Digimon who was the source of Mercurymon and Sakkakumon.

=== Other Digimon ===
Ophanimon (オファニモン, Ofanimon)
Voiced by: Rika Fukami (Ophanimon), Yoko Asada (Salamon) (Japanese); Mary Elizabeth McGlynn (both) (English)
An Ophanim-themed Digimon and one of the three Celestial Digimon. To stop Cherubimon after her imprisonment, she sent out messages to the human world in hopes of finding children brave enough to inherit the spirits of the Legendary Warriors. She guides the DigiDestined through messages sent through their D-Tectors. Ophanimon sacrifices herself after a failed attempt to purify Cherubimon, while gifting Takuya and Koji the ability to spirit evolve into EmperorGreymon and MagnaGarurumon respectively. She is later reborn as the Plott Hound-themed Salamon (プロットモン, Purottomon) towards the end of the series.
Seraphimon (セラフィモン, Serafimon) / Patamon (パタモン, Patamon)
Voiced by: Nobuyuki Hirami (Seraphimon), Kae Araki (Patamon) (Japanese); Jamieson Price (Seraphimon), Bridget Hoffman (Patamon) (English)
A Seraphim-themed Digimon and one of the three Celestial Digimon. When Cherubimon was corrupted and led a Beast Digimon uprising, Seraphimon was defeated. His servant Sorcermon was able to save Seraphimon and place him in stasis. This lasted until the Legendary Warriors arrived at Seraphimon's palace and freed them. Grumblemon attacked with Ranamon, Arbormon, and Mercurymon. Seraphimon was able to defeat Grumblemon, Ranamon, and Arbormon before being defeated by Mercurymon, who stole his fractal code. After Mercurymon was defeated, the fractal code he stole from Seraphimon went to his egg and he was reborn as the flying guinea pig-themed Digimon Patamon, who wears a waistband like Bokomon. While most of his divine power was used up as a DigiEgg to provide Koji and Takuya the ability to Fusion Evolve, Patamon retains some ability to detect power. Although he is Seraphimon reborn, he is still a child and acts as such, and views Bokomon as a parental figure.
Floramon (フローラモン, Furōramon)
Voiced by: Mamiko Noto, Nao Koyama (Japanese); Philece Sampler, Dorothy Elias-Fahn (English)
A plant/reptile-themed Digimon that were inhabitants of the Breezy Village where they are being attacked by three Mushroomon.
Gotsumon (ゴツモン, Gotsumon)
Voiced by: Yasuhiro Takato (Japanese); R. Martin Klein (English)
A humanoid rock-themed Digimon that lived in a Gotsumon Village and admired the Legendary Warriors. As the local archaeologist, he was the one who uncovered the B Spirit of Light during Grumblemon's attack which enabled Koji to become KendoGarurumon who fought him off. Gotsumon did managed to get Koji to overcome his instincts. Sometime later, the same Gotsumon joined the Legendary Warriors when his village was destroyed by Crusadermon, Dynasmon, and their army of Knightmon. During the fight at Seraphimon's Castle, Gotsumon suddenly Digivolved passed his Champion Level and became Meteormon (インセキモン, Insekimon) who defeated the remaining Knightmon army. Though Meteormon was wounded enough to De-Digivolve back to Gotsumon. Following Seraphimon's Castle being scanned by Dynasmon, Gotsumon was evacuated.
Sorcermon (ソーサリモン, Sōsarimon)
Voiced by: Kazunari Kojima (Japanese); Dave Wittenberg (English)
Sorcermon is a sorcerer-themed Digimon that resembles a white-clothed version of Wizardmon. He served as Sorcermon's retainer and property caretaker. When the Legendary Warriors arrived at Seraphimon's Castle, Sorcermon took them to where Seraphimon's body was. When Grumblemon, Ranamon, Arbormon, and Mercurymon attack, Sorcermon tries to fight them off and is defeated. Following Seraphimon's defeat, Sorcermon sacrificed his life to buy the Legendary Warriors time to get away from Grumblemon, Ranamon, Arbormon, and Mercurymon. Though his DigiEgg was not seen. His ghost later helped to protect the Legendary Warriors from Dynasmon's attack before disappearing.
Datamon (ナノモン, Nanomon)
Voiced by: Yūichi Nagashima (Japanese); Tom Fahn (English)
A small robot-themed Digimon that has a shop in the Autumn Leaf Fair. Tommy encountered Datamon after the Toucanmon sold him the D-Tectors they stole from the Legendary Warriors. During Arbormon's attack, Datamon was revealed to have placed the B Spirit of Ice in Tommy's D-Tector enabling him to become Korikakumon and fight him off. Later on, Datamon helps with the defenses of the Autumn Leaf Fair and is later evacuated.
Sepikmon (セピックモン, Sepikkumon)
Voiced by: Satoshi Taki (Japanese); Michael McConnohie (English)
A monkey/Aborigine-themed Digimon. He originally attacked Neemon and Bokomon on the Continent of Darkness until Agunimon rescued them. After clearing up the misunderstanding where he wanted to make friends with them, Sepikmon directs Agunimon, Neemon, and Bokomon to where Ranamon and Mercurymon have Agunimon's captive friends. Later on, Sepikmon was at the Autumn Leaf Fair. Later on, Sepikmon helps with the defense of the Autumn Leaf Fair. His boomerang helped him report to the Legendary Warriors that the Legendary Warriors were about to be engaged by a Zanbamon, a Gryphonmon, a Pteramon, a GranKuwagamon, and 5 Airdramon. Sepikmon was later evacuated.
Oryxmon (ゴートモン, Gōtomon)
Voiced by: Keiichi Sonobe (Japanese); Derek Stephen Prince (English)
A goat-themed Digimon who worked as the caretaker of Cherubimon's Castle and was not corrupted by him. He was the one who took the Legendary Warriors to where Ophanimon was imprisoned after Löwemon defeated the Phantomon guards. Cherubimon planned for this to happen and destroyed Oryxmon after he served his purpose.
Swanmon (スワンモン, Suwanmon)
Voiced by: Mari Adachi (Japanese); Wendee Lee (English)
A swan-like Digimon who is the caretaker of the Village of Beginnings for the baby Digimon and the DigiEggs, she was then attacked by the Royal Knights. She is successfully evacuated along with the children and eggs on the Trailmon.
Nefertimon (ネフェルティモン, Neferutimon)
Voiced by: Ai Nagano (Japanese); Bridget Hoffman (English)
Nefertimon is a sphinx-themed Holy Beast Digimon who serves as the caretaker of Ophanimon's castle, which contains an enormous library. When the DigiDestined arrive at the castle to protect the last area from the Royal Knights' rampage, Nefertimon allows them to search the castle freely in hopes of finding the area's key and prevent it from being scanned. When the Royal Knights arrive, they reveal that Nefertimon herself is the key; she pleads for the DigiDestined to kill her so the area is permanently protected, but they refuse and attempt to fight the Royal Knights. Lucemon intervenes during the battle, resulting in the DigiDestined's defeat and allowing the Royal Knights to scan Nefertimon's data and destroy the final area of the Digital World.

==== Lost Island inhabitants ====
The film Island of the Lost Digimon featured the Lost Island which is inhabited by both Human Digimon and Beast Digimon.

The following Human Digimon live on the Lost Island and make use of the Pinocchi and Tacos tanks:

Kotemon (コテモン, Kotemon)
Voiced by: Taeko Kawata (Japanese); Debi Mae West (English)
A kendo/reptile-themed Digimon from the Human Digimon part of the Lost Island. Before being reduced to a DigiEgg by Ornismon, Kotemon prayed for the spirits of AncientGreymon and AncientGarurumon to come help. During the credits, Kotemon was reborn.
Dinohyumon (ディノヒューモン, Dinohyūmon)
Voiced by: Yuji Ueda (Japanese); Doug Erholtz (English)
A dinosauroid-themed Digimon and Kotemon's older brother who answered to Murmukusmon's Darcmon form and leads the Human Digimon army. He would later learn about Murmukusmon's plot to revive Ornismon.
Yasyamon (ヤシャモン, Yashamon)
Voiced by: Yoshikazu Nagano
A group of Yaksha/dragon-themed Digimon that makes up Dinohyumon's army.
Bucchiemon (プッチーモン, Putchīmon)
Voiced by: Miwa Matsumoto
A group of fairy-themed Digimon that makes up Dinohyumon's army.
FlameWizardmon (フレイウィザーモン, Furēwizāmon)
Voiced by: Katashi Ishizuka
A group of fire wizard-themed Digimon that make up Dinohyumon's army.
Nohemon (ノヘモン, Nohemon)
Voiced by: Yūsuke Oguri
A group of scarecrow-themed Digimon that make up Dinohyumon's army.

The following Beast Digimon live on the Lost Island and wield the Arca, Tortoise, and Yubo tanks:

Bearmon (ベアモン, Beamon)
Voiced by: Akemi Okamura (Japanese); Wendee Lee (English)
A bear cub-themed Digimon from the Human Digimon part of the Lost Island who is friends with Kotemon.
Grizzlymon (グリズモン, Gurizumon)
Voiced by: Kenta Miyake (Japanese); Peter Spellos (English)
A bear-themed Digimon and Bearmon's older brother who answers to Murmukusmon's HippoGryphonmon form, leads the Human Digimon army, and is Dinohyumon's rival. He would later learn of Murmukusmon's plot to revive Ornismon.
Boarmon (ボアモン, Boamon)
An army of fiery boar-themed Digimon that make up Grizzlymon's army.
Bullmon (ブルモン, Burumon)
Voiced by: Kazuhiko Nishimatsu
An army of bull-themed Digimon that make up Grizzlymon's army.
Moosemon (ムースモン, Mūsumon)
Voiced by: Eiji Itou
An army of moose-themed Digimon that make up Grizzlymon's army.
Oryxmon (ゴートモン, Gōtomon)
An army of goat-themed Digimon that make up Grizzlymon's army.
Prairiemon (プレイリモン, Purērimon)
Voiced by: Nobuaki Kanemitsu
An army of prairie dog/rabbit-themed Digimon that make up Grizzlymon's army.
Rabbitmon (ビットモン, Bittomon)
An army of rabbit-themed Digimon that make up Grizzlymon's army.

== Production ==
Toei Animation announced the production of a fourth Digimon series in February 2002 and was set to start in April, after Tamers. Digimon Frontier was conceived by Fuji TV's Go Haruna, Yomiko Advertising's Kyōtarō Kimura, and Hiromi Seki. The series was directed by Yukio Kaizawa, who had previously worked on some Bikkuriman shows and certain One Piece episodes. It was chiefly written by Sukehiro Tomita, while character designs were done by Katsuyoshi Nakatsuru.

Digimon Frontier aired in Japan on Fuji TV from April 7, 2002, to March 30, 2003. The show's opening theme song is "Fire!!" by Kōji Wada, which peaked at #75 on the Oricon Weekly Singles Chart. The ending theme songs are "Innocent (Mujaki na Mama de)" (イノセント〜無邪気なままで〜, Inosento ~Mujaki na Mama de~) by Wada for the first half and "An Endless Tale" by Wada and AiM for the second half. The insert songs featured in the show are "With the Will" by Kōji Wada, which served as the Spirit Evolution theme, and "The Last Element" by Ayumi Miyazaki, which was the theme song for Unified Spirit Evolution.

Certain scenes involving sexuality were censored for the North American release.

An English-language version, produced by Sensation Animation, aired in North America as the final season of Digimon: Digital Monsters. It aired on UPN's Disney's Animation Weekdays block and Canada's YTV between September 9, 2002, and July 14, 2003. Frontier was part of a package deal with Digimon Tamers from when Disney had acquired the rights from Saban Entertainment. UPN aired the show until late August 2003, when they severed their ties to Disney. As with previous "seasons", the English version of Frontier featured an original soundtrack and sound effects, character name changes, and content edits pertaining to scenes deemed too inappropriate for young audiences. The theme song of the English version was produced by Chris Horvath. In addition to the theme song, the show also featured music by Deddy Tzur and Inon Zur.

== Media ==
=== Home releases ===
New Video Group released a complete DVD box set of the English-language version on September 10, 2013, in the US, and a DVD collection of the complete English run of Digimon: Digital Monsters, bundling Frontier with the previous three anime series, on October 22, 2013. Manga Entertainment released the series in the United Kingdom on October 29, 2018.

The series was released on Blu-ray in Japan on April 2, 2019, featuring all 50 episodes remastered in high definition. The first-edition box set included a newly recorded drama CD titled A Train Named Hope, which features the original Japanese voice cast and depicts the main characters during their high school years.

=== Film ===
A film companion, Digimon Frontier: Island of Lost Digimon was produced with the same writer, composer and character designer from the TV show, but was directed by Takahiro Imamura. The film premiered at Toei's Summer Anime Fair on July 20, 2002, along with three other productions. Although the fair was deemed a box office failure, earning 800 million yen (US$6.8m)—whereas last edition earned 2 billion yen—, the film alone grossed half of it, 460 million yen. The film aired on Jetix in the United States on November 27, 2005, and reruns were broadcast on Toon Disney in 2007.

=== Drama CD ===
A drama CD titled Digimon Frontier: Original Story: What I Want to Tell You (デジモンフロンティア オリジナルストーリー 伝えたいこと, Dejimon Furontia: Orijinaru Sutōrī Tsutaetai Koto) was released on April 23, 2003, and is centered on each of the Legendary Warriors sending messages to each other. The cast from the television series reprised their roles.

=== Video game ===
A video game adaptation, Digimon Battle Spirit 2, was released for the WonderSwan Color and the Game Boy Advance in 2002 and 2004, respectively.

== Legacy ==
On July 30, 2022, the original Japanese voice cast reunited at DigiFes 2022 to celebrate the series's 20th anniversary. The event featured an original live dramatic reading written by producer Hiromi Seki and screenwriter Akatsuki Yamatoya. Set two years after the conclusion of the television series, the story followed the protagonists during their first summer of middle school.
