= New Video =

American digital content distributor

- Company type: Subsidiary
- Industry: Entertainment
- Predecessor: Gaiam Vivendi Entertainment
- Founded: July 27, 1990; 35 years ago
- Founders: Susan Margolin; Steve Savage
- Headquarters: New York City, United States
- Services: Digital distribution
- Parent: Cineverse
- Divisions: Docurama Films; Flatiron Film Company
- Website: www.newvideo.com

New Video (stylized as NEWVIDEO) is an American independent entertainment distributor and collector of independent digital content owned by Cineverse. The company works with independent producers, filmmakers and television networks to curate content for many types of distribution platforms, including digital, cable, video on demand, Blu-ray, DVD, and theatrical releases.

Until 2012, New Video marketed and distributed television series and films for A&E Home Entertainment, which included A&E, History Channel, and Lifetime. New Video's library includes Major League Baseball games, films from Tribeca Film and storybook content from Scholastic and Weston Woods. New Video also previously distributed films for Arthouse Films and Plexifilm.

== History ==
In 2011, New Video partnered with China Lion to distribute Chinese-language films across North America via various platforms. New Video was named as the exclusive aggregation partner to digital platforms for the Sundance Institute's Artist Services Initiative.

Co-presidents of New Video, Susan Margolin and Steve Savage, received the 2011 Digital 25 Award by the Producers Guild of America and Variety. The award recognizes individuals who have contributed to the advancement of digital entertainment and storytelling.

New Video was purchased by Cinedigm in early 2012.

In 2013, Cinedigm (now Cineverse) purchased Gaiam Vivendi Entertainment $51.5M, and became the successor to GoodTimes Entertainment.

== Services ==
New Video Digital is the world's largest independent digital video distributor. It provides over 10,000 hours of film and television to download and to streaming platforms, such as iTunes, Netflix, and Hulu.

== Select releases ==
Year	Title	Awards	Notes
2011	Bobby Fischer Against the World	Official Selection 2011 Sundance Film Festival	DVD
2011	Hell and Back Again	Winner Grand Jury Prize 2011 Sundance Film Festival, Winner Cinematography Prize 2011 Sundance Film Festival	Theatrical release
2011	The Last Mountain	Official Selection 2011 Sundance Film Festival	DVD & Digital
2011	Hot Coffee	Official Selection 2011 Sundance Film Festival; Winner Grand Jury Prize Best Documentary 2011 Seattle International Film Festival	DVD
2011	GasLand		DVD
2008	Dr. Horrible's Sing-Along Blog		DVD & Digital
2007	Purple Violets		Digital
2004	Super Size Me		Digital
1967	Bob Dylan: Don't Look Back		DVD

== Divisions ==
Docurama Films is a distributor of home video documentaries and has expanded to digital and theatrical platforms. In 2009, Docurama Films celebrated its tenth anniversary by screening special series at the IFC Center in New York City.

Select Docurama Films releases include:

- The Atomic Cafe (1982)
- Best Boy (1979)
- Blue Vinyl (2002)
- Bob Dylan: Don't Look Back (1990)
- Gasland (2010)
- Genghis Blues (1999)
- Hell and Back Again (2011)
- Hot Coffee (2011)
- The Last Mountain (2011)
- Lost Boys of Sudan (2003)
- Southern Comfort (2001)
- The Weather Underground (2002)
- The Wild Parrots of Telegraph Hill (2005)

Flatiron Film Company is a distributor of next-generation Indian and foreign films, as well as web titles from Mondo Media, such as Happy Tree Friends. Flatiron distributed Mondo's first feature-length animated film, Dick Figures: The Movie. The company also handles US theatrical distribution for Elite Squad: The Enemy Within, Brazil's highest-grossing film.

Select Flatiron Film Company releases include:

- Digimon
- Dr. Horrible's Sing-Along Blog (2008)
- The Guild (Season 1–4)
- Red vs. Blue (Season 1–16)
- RWBY (Volume 1–6)
- The Secret of Kells (2009)
- Yu-Gi-Oh!
