= Digimon Fusion =

Japanese anime television series

- Promotional poster
- デジモンクロスウォーズ
- Genre: Adventure, fantasy
- Created by: Akiyoshi Hongo
- Developed by: Riku Sanjo (season 1)
- Directed by: Tetsuya Endo (#1–54); Yukio Kaizawa (#55–79)
- Music by: Kousuke Yamashita
- Country of origin: Japan
- Original language: Japanese
- No. of episodes: 79 (list of episodes)

Production
- Producers: Tomoharu Matsuhisa; Hiroyuki Sakurada
- Production companies: TV Asahi; Toei Animation

Original release
- Network: ANN (TV Asahi)
- Release: July 6, 2010 – March 25, 2012

Related
- Manga
- Written by: Yuki Nakashima
- Published by: Shueisha
- Magazine: V Jump
- Original run: June 21, 2010 – March 21, 2012
- Volumes: 4
- Digimon franchise
- Digimon Adventure; Digimon Adventure 02; Digimon Adventure tri.; Digimon Tamers; Digimon Frontier; Digimon Data Squad (Savers); Digimon Universe: App Monsters; Digimon Adventure (2020); Digimon Ghost Game; Digimon Beatbreak

Digimon Fusion, known in Japan as Digimon Xros Wars (デジモンクロスウォーズ, Dejimon Kurosu Wōzu; pronounced "Cross Wars") and also titled as Digimon Fusion Battles, is the sixth anime television series in the Digimon franchise, produced by Toei Animation. The series aired on TV Asahi from July 2010 to March 2012.

Its storyline follows the adventures of Mikey Kudo, who utilizes the power to fuse any of his Digimon partners. The series is divided into three arcs, with the latter two given the subtitles of The Evil Death Generals and the Seven Kingdoms (悪のデスジェネラルと七つの王国, Aku no Desu Jeneraru to Nanatsu no Ōkoku), and The Boy Hunters Who Leapt Through Time (時を駆ける少年ハンターたち, Toki o Kakeru Shōnen Hantā-tachi) respectively.

The series was licensed outside of Asia by Saban Brands for an English-language adaptation, which was produced by Studiopolis; the third and final arc did not receive an English localization. The series was also adapted into a manga series and multiple video games.

== Plot ==
=== Season 1 ===
Mikey Kudo receives the Fusion Loader, creates his own team (Fusion Fighters) and recruits some Digimon partners in the Digital World. There, he learns that Lord Bagramon is attempting to conquer the world by collecting 108 Code Crown fragments and wields the Darkness Loader. Mikey collects some fragments from each zones, but Bagramon steals them and recruits AxeKnightmon. Mikey, Angie Hinomoto and Jeremy Tsurugi are sent back to the human world, but Mikey returns to the Digital World, leaving his friends behind.

=== Season 2 ===
When Bagramon creates an empire divided into seven kingdoms, Mikey, Christopher Aonuma and Nene Amano defeat each general. They learn that Bagramon is using Ewan to oppose them, while they gathered negative energy from those which transformed fragments into a Dark Stone (D5). After Mikey saves Ewan and retrieves all fragments, Shoutmon defeats Bagramon and plans to bring peace to both worlds.

=== Season 3 ===
One year later, Mikey discovers an unstable realm between both worlds and learns that Quartzmon is absorbing data. The DigiQuartz is where Digimon Hunters capture Digimon for leaving any world and feeding negative emotions on anyone. The Clock Store Owner (a revived and regretful Bagramon in disguise) unites all heroic characters from different parallel universes. Tagiru and Gumdramon wield Bagramon's lost arm "Brave Snatcher", in order to defeat Quartzmon. With both worlds restored, all humans and their partners are separately return to their own universe. The series ends with Mikey, Tagiru and their friends planning their future.

== Characters ==
=== Fusion Fighters ===
The Fusion Fighters (known as Xros Heart in Japan) are the primary protagonist group in Digimon Fusion. The group is led by Mikey Kudo, who gains the Fusion Loader, a device that allows Digimon to combine through a process known as DigiXros. Using this ability, the team travels throughout the Digital World to oppose the Bagra Army and prevent it from gaining control by collecting the different scattered fragments of the Code Crown

Mikey Kudo (工藤 タイキ, Kudō Taiki)
Voiced by: Minami Takayama (Japanese); Nicolas Roye (English)
Mikey Kudo is an upbeat middle school teenager who helps anyone in need. He excels in all sports and has a charming personality that wins over humans and Digimon alike, though he has a tendency to overexert himself. Receiving his red Fusion Loader from Omnimon, one of the Legendary Digimon, Mikey founded the Fusion Fighters alongside his partner Shoutmon. Aside from his charisma, Mikey has proven himself to be an excellent strategist, able to see through the plans of his enemies and counter them accordingly, making his presence a necessity for the team. Unlike other members, Mikey can hear the melody of Digimon that are in life-threatening danger. When Bagramon steals all 108 Code Crown fragments, he sends Mikey, Angie, Jeremy and Shoutmon back to Earth. There, Mikey learns that time on Earth is far slower than in the Digital World before he attempts to find a way back to the Digital World to save it. By then, the one who gave him his Fusion Loader is revealed to be Omnimon, who reveals the origin of the DigiCards as well as the history of the Digital World and tells them how he ended up on Earth as a DigiCard and has been searching for someone who could hear him, which turns out to be Mikey, as only he can hear the Digital Melody. After enabling Shoutmon to digivolve into OmniShoutmon, in order to do battle, defeat and ultimately destroy Tactimon, Mikey returns to the Digital World to liberate it from Bagramon.
Shoutmon (シャウトモン, Shautomon)
Voiced by: Chika Sakamoto (Japanese); Benjamin Diskin (English)
Shoutmon is a dragon/musician-like Digimon with extremely high aggressiveness due to hot-blooded enthusiasm, yet friendly towards his comrades. He enjoys singing and wields a microphone for leisure and to help in combat, his chances of winning depending on the amount of passion he has. When wounded while protecting the Village of Light from the Bagra Army's invasion of the Forest Zone, Shoutmon met Mikey as the two eventually join forces to save his home from the invaders. Becoming Mikey's main Digimon partner, Shoutmon's goal is to become Digimon King in order to better protect others, seeing the Code Crown fragments as a mean to fulfill his selfless desire. He acts as the core component of all the Fusion Fighters' primary DigiFusions and is the only member of the Fusion Fighters able to digivolve by himself naturally as well.
Angie Hinamoto (陽ノ本 アカリ, Hinomoto Akari)
Voiced by: Ryoko Shiraishi (Japanese); Colleen O'Shaughnessey (English)
Angie is a kind student, a year younger than Mikey, who often ends up taking care of him when he tires himself out. She has proven herself to be strong-willed and courageous, such as when she overcame Laylamon's mind control by slashing her in the face with the Lake Zone's Code Crown fragment. Angie lives with her family, taking care of her three younger siblings. She stated to play shooting games with one of them, which helped in the Island Zone sub-arc. At one point, she and Mikey became close friends. She acts as the Fusion Fighters' peacemaker, often cheering on the backup members of the team in battle and forming a special bond with Cutemon. While fighting Quartzmon, Angie receives an orange Fusion Loader, and has Cutemon and Dorulumon as partners for the Fusion Fighters United Army.
Dorulumon (ドルルモン, Dorurumon)
Voiced by: Takahiro Sakurai (Japanese); Kyle Hebert (English)
Dorulumon is a lion-maned wolf-like Digimon with drills on his body and Cutemon's guardian. He once served with the Bagra Army as Tactimon's right-hand man, until leaving the organization due to its cruel methods, which involved sacrificing some of his own troops. Though he rejected repeated offers from Mikey to join the Fusion Fighters, preferring to travel alone, while aiding Cutemon in finding his parents, Dorulumon became a Fusion Fighter to honor his fallen friend BlueMeramon.
Cutemon (キュートモン, Kyūtomon)
Voiced by: Houko Kuwashima (Japanese); Benjamin Diskin (English)
Cutemon is a mischievous and peppy but timid pink rabbit-like Fairy Digimon, whose ears allow him to sense nearby Digimon. Being the only one of his village to have escaped from the Bagra Army, Cutemon was found by Dorulumon as the two search for his abducted parents. Cutemon encountered Angie while in the Village of Light, taking a liking to her and her friends before eventually joining the team as their healer. In the process, Cutemon manages to find his parents but remains with the Fusion Fighters.
Jeremy Tsurugi (剣 ゼンジロウ, Tsurugi Zenjirō)
Voiced by: Daisuke Kishio (Japanese); Derek Stephen Prince (English)
Jeremy Tsurugi is Mikey's classmate, considering himself to be his rival and demanding a rematch since the then-amateur he defeated him at a kendo championship competition. An exceedingly sensible person, he insists on troublesome things like how etiquette in a duel should be properly implemented. Because of this, Mikey feels awkward around his presence and Angie very obviously tries to chase him away. On the other hand, he grows familiar with the enemy's mentality and becomes a supporter for Mikey and the other Fusion Fighters. His parents run a mechanic-type business. Thanks to this, he is knowledgeable about machines and does repairs to Ballistamon.
Ballistamon (バリスタモン, Barisutamon)
Voiced by: Takeshi Kusao (Japanese); Kyle Hebert (English)
Ballistamon is Shoutmon's best friend and a noble, taciturn warrior, who resembles a robotic rhinoceros beetle. He was originally DarkVolumon (ダークボリューモン, DākuBoryūmon), a robotic stag beetle equipped with powerful gatling cannons and a large loudspeaker who was created by Olegmon as a superweapon. A test of his sonic powers went awry and sent him into the Forest Zone, causing him to shut down. DarkVolumon was found by Shoutmon, who repaired and reconfigured him. With most of his memories lost, DarkVolumon was rechristened "Ballistamon" by Shoutmon and became his friend. Though Olegmon later restores his minion's memory, Shoutmon snaps Ballistamon to his senses.
Starmon (スターモン, Sutāmon)
Voiced by: Bin Shimada (Japanese); Patrick Seitz (English)
Starmon is a small, star-shaped Digimon with sunglasses, who serves as the Pickmon leader and sees Shoutmon as their boss. Unlike the original Starmon, this Starmon is just a mobile star-shape. Normally forming the hilt of the Star Sword, Rare Star Sword and Star Axe, Starmon can become the gunsight of the Meteor Cannon when DigiFused with Beelzemon and several silver Pickmon. In the manga, Starmon and Pickmon can DNA Digivolve into ShootingStarmon (シューティングスターモン, ShūtinguSutāmon).
Pickmonz (ピックモンズ, Pikkumonzu)
Voiced by: Kokoro Kikuchi (Japanese); Mary Elizabeth McGlynn, Colleen O'Shaughnessey (English)
The Pickmonz are a group of small guitar pick-themed Digimon who view Starmon as their leader. The Pickmon come in three varieties: yellow, silver and red. The yellow Pickmon DigiFuse with Starmon to form the Star Axe (スターアックス, Sutā Akkusu) and release Chibickmon (チビックモン, Chibikkumonzu) from their mouths, with whom they can telepathically communicate. Several silver Pickmon can DigiFuse into the Digimon Slingshot (デジモンパチンコ, Dejimon Pachinko) and can also DigiFuse with Starmon to form the Star Sword (スターソード, Sutā Sōdo). The silver Pickmon can DigiFuse with the single red Pickmon to form the Rare Star Sword (レアスターソード, Rea Sutā Sōdo), a special sword which is wielded by either Jeremy or Shoutmon.
Dondokomon (ドンドコモン, Dondokomon)
Voiced by: Takahiro Sakurai (Japanese); Joe Ochman (English)
Dondokomon is a small Digimon shaped like a taikō drum with drum sticks for arms. Living with his kind in the Village of Light, Dondokomon chooses to travel with the Fusion Fighters.
Jijimon (ジジモン, Jijimon)
Voiced by: Bin Shimada (Japanese); Christopher Corey Smith (English)
Jijimon is an elderly man-themed Digimon who serves as a sage-like figure in the Village of Light. He accompanies the Fusion Fighters and acts as their guide.
Lilymon (リリモン, Ririmon; Lilimon)
Voiced by: Kokoro Kikuchi (Japanese); Laura Bailey (English)
Lilymon is a plant fairy-themed Digimon and Shoutmon's childhood friend in the Village of Light, helping him in his attempt to convince Mikey in staying. She assists Mikey and Shoutmon when they returned to the Digital World, updating them on what occurred in their absence and rescuing the other Fusion Fighters from Dorbickmon.
ChibiTortomon (カメモン, Kamemon)
Voiced by: Ryoko Shiraishi (Japanese); Cindy Robinson (English)
ChibiTortomon is a small turtle/computer mouse-themed Digimon who lived in the Island Zone and admired the Fusion Fighters when they came to his home with a desire to be as strong as them. After some inspiring words from Shoutmon to follow his dream, ChibiTortomon helps the Fusion Fighters against Octomon before joining the group. As a member of the Fusion Fighters, ChibiTortomon serves as an underwater scout and enables Digimon he is Digifused with to breathe and swim freely underwater.
Beastmon (バステモン, Basutemon; Bastemon)
Voiced by: Tomomi Kasai (Japanese); Laura Bailey (English)
Beastmon is a Bastet/Nekomata-themed Digimon and the princess of the Lake Zone, who has a habit of sleeping. She also developed a crush on Mikey, whom she refers to as "Lord Mikey" (タイキ様, Taiki-sama), much to the annoyance of Angie.
Knightmon (ナイトモン, Naitomon)
Voiced by: Masaki Terasoma (Japanese); Travis Willingham (English)

Knightmon is a knight-themed Digimon who is loyal to Beastmon. He was saved by Mikey when the Fusion Fighters came to the Lake Zone following his army's fight with IceDevimon. Knightmon refers to Mikey as "Master Mikey" (タイキどの, Taiki-dono) and Beastmon as "Lady Beastmon" (バステモン様, Basutemon-sama).

PawnChessmon (ポーンチェスモンズ, Pōnchesumon)
Voiced by: Masaki Terasoma (Japanese); Mary Elizabeth McGlynn, Colleen Villard (English)
Eight pawn-themed Digimon who are under Knightmon's leadership, also join the Fusion Fighters once they save the Lake Zone. In the Japanese version, they tend to say "Chess" at the end of their sentences, and refer to Knightmon as "Lord Knightmon" (Naitomon-sama).
Deputymon (リボルモン, Riborumon; Revolmon)
Voiced by: Junko Minagawa (Japanese); Michael Sorich (English)
Deputymon is a deputy sheriff/revolver-themed Digimon that the Fusion Fighters met in the Sand Zone. He was looking for a treasure in a diamond mine when he ran into the Fusion Fighters. Deputymon later gave the Sand Zone's Code Crown fragment and four DigiCards to Mikey. When Laylamon forcibly teleported the Fusion Fighters out of the Sand Zone, Deputymon was taken with them, officially making him a part of the team, with the main role of tracker. In the English dub, Deputymon speaks in a Western accent and his gun parts were recolored to blue.
Beelzemon (ベルゼブモン, Beruzebumon; Beelzebumon)
Voiced by: Daisuke Kishio (Japanese); Matthew Mercer (English)
He was originally Reapmon (バアルモン, Baarumon, Baalmon; 1–14), an elusive rifle-wielding Baal-themed Digimon who lived in the Sand Zone's city of Silica and was raised by the Warriors of Light under the guidance of their leader, Angemon. However, the actions of Laylamon, via Ebemon, led to the sect's downfall and Silica's ruin, with Reapmon joining the Bagra Army to find the one responsible to avenge his friends. Reapmon sacrifices himself to protect Shoutmon from HiMachinedramon. This causes his order's goddess to finally accept him as her warrior and reincarnate him into the Beezlebub-themed Beelzemon. Beelzemon is armed with a large gun attached to his right arm and the ability to move through Zones on his own.
Puppetmon (ピノッキモン, Pinokimon; Pinochimon)
Voiced by: Keiichi Nanba (Japanese); Todd Haberkorn (English)
A marionette-themed resident of the Dust Zone, Puppetmon's nose grows longer when he lies. Originally a moody and distrusting figure due to the lifestyle in the Dust Zone, Puppetmon desired to leave it and saw a chance when he steals Mikey's Fusion Loader to give to GrandLocomon. However, GrandLocomon goes back on their deal and Puppetmon sides with the Fusion Fighters to get back the Fusion Loader.
Wisemon (ワイズモン, Waizumon)
Voiced by: Shō Hayami (Japanese); Dan Woren (Season 1), Steve Kramer (Season 2) (English)
A sage-themed researcher of the Digital World who Mikey encounters upon colliding with his book (which is immune to the effects of the Digital Space) after being separated from the Fusion Fighters by Arukadhimon. Wisemon wanted to research Mikey in various ways. He assists Mikey in saving the rest of the Fusion Fighters from Arukadhimon at the cost of his book. Mikey discovered, upon arrival in the Warrior Zone, that Wisemon had joined up with them. Wisemon serves as the Fusion Fighters' advisor and researcher and possesses telekinetic abilities.

=== Blue Flare ===
Christopher Aonuma (蒼沼 キリハ, Aonuma Kiriha)
Voiced by: Takeshi Kusao (Japanese); Vic Mignogna, Kathryn Feller (young) (English)
Christopher Aonuma is a blond teenager who conquers others by coldly eliminating them. Before coming to the Digital World, he is the son of the CEO of the Aonuma Group and head of the Aonuma Clan, who is mistreated to mold him into a successor by sending him to an elite school. The time Christopher was twelve after his strict parents died in an accident, Christopher's estate was taken away by the authorities and it caused his personality to turn ruthless. By the time Bagramon learned of this when he sensed his negative emotions and the desire to become as strong as his father reached its peak, he gave him his blue Fusion Loader in secret, thus letting Christopher selling his soul to him. Soon after, Christopher formed Team Blue Flare, a group that reflects his ambition to be strong and undisputed. After MegaDarknessBagramon's defeat, regaining some of his parents' fortune, Christopher moved to America to atone for his sins and pay for what he has done due to his deeds with the devil.
Greymon (グレイモン, Gureimon)
Voiced by: Takeshi Kusao (Japanese); Kyle Hebert (English)
Greymon is a gray-skinned dinosuar-themed Digmon with the horn of a Ceratosaurus, a black rhinoceros beetle-like skull on its head, and a bayonet-tipped tail who is Christopher's main partner and primary Digimon in Team Blue Flare. Like his human partner, Greymon valued strength above everything else and had no respect for Shoutmon as he tends to insult his size.
MailBirdramon (メイルバードラモン, MeiruBādoramon)
Voiced by: Daisuke Kishio (Japanese); Patrick Seitz (English)
A metal bird of prey-themed Digimon who serves as Christopher's primary vehicle of transportation. He forms the armor of MetalGreymon.
Cyberdramon (サイバードラモン, Saibādoramon)
Voiced by: Takeshi Kusao (Japanese); Neil Kaplan (English)
A fearsome cyborg dragonoid-themed with a lance as his weapon. This version of Cyberdramon is much different from the original one. Cyberdramon can transform into the Cyber Crusher (サイバーランチャー, Saibā Ranchā; Cyber Launcher) to be used by MetalGreymon.
Deckerdramon (デッカードラモン, Dekkādoramon)
Voiced by: Kōji Yada (Japanese); Michael Sorich (English)
The Jungle Zone's former guardian. A metallic alligator/dragon-themed Digimon armed with powerful weaponry, including his Crocodile Cannons. He was sought out by SkullKnightmon for the purpose of allying, but chose to join Christopher and Blue Flare instead. He forms the tank treads and arm-mounted cannon of DeckerGreymon. Deckerdramon can also transform into Deckerdramon Float Mode (デッカードラモン フロートモード, Dekkādoramon Furōto Mōdo) for water transportation.
Dracomon (ドラコモン, Dorakomon)
Voiced by: Megumi Urawa (Japanese); Johnny Yong Bosch (English)
A small dragon-themed Digimon encountered by Mikey and Shoutmon in Dragonland after deserting the Bagra Army, as his ideal meaning of strength differs from Dorbickmon's. After meeting with and talking to Christopher, having idolized the human and played in a role in him able to digivolve MetalGreymon to ZekeGreymon, Dracomon decided to join him upon leaving Dragonland.
Golemon (ゴーレモン, Gōremon)
A bunch of golem-themed Digimon who make up the foot soldiers of Blue Flare.
Gaossmon (ガオスモン, Gaosumon)
A bunch of Gasosaurus-themd Digimon who make up Blue Flare's foot soldiers.
Volcdramon (ヴォルクドラモン, Vorukudoramon)
A dragon/volcano-themed Digimon who is the target of a special Digimon Hunter gathering, organized by the Clock Store Owner. Christopher and ZekeGreymon manage to capture Volcdramon, who would cause catastrophic damage if left unchecked.

=== Midnight ===
Nene Amano (天野 ネネ, Amano Nene)
Voiced by: Houko Kuwashima (Japanese); Melissa Fahn (English)
Nena Amano is a figurehead leader of Team Midnight after receiving the black Fusion Loader from SkullKnightmon after he promised to reunite with her brother Ewan in his agenda. On SkullKnightmon's orders, Nene continuously spies and assists, Mikey and Christopher, forming an alliance with the latter in the Lake Zone. Though she travels separately from them, using the Monitamon to stay in touch, Nene uses her intelligence gathering to help the Fusion Fighters, while looking for her brother. While in Honey Land, gaining Mervamon as an ally, Nene finally finds her brother Ewan, as well as learns that he is deceived by SkullKnightmon into believing that the Digital World and its inhabitants are all part of a virtual game where killing Digimon and humans alike will bear no consequences. Upon learning of this, Nene vowed to make Ewan realize the truth and bring him back home. After MegaDarknessBagramon's defeat, Nene travels to Hong Kong to become an idol.
Sparrowmon (スパロウモン, Suparōmon)
Voiced by: Kokoro Kikuchi (Japanese); Michelle Ruff (English)
Sparrowmon is a mechanical yellow sparrow/fighter aircraft-themed Digimon with a trigger-happy personality who is Nene's main partner.
Mervamon (メルヴァモン, Meruvamon)
Voiced by: Ryoko Shiraishi (Japanese); Tara Platt (English)
Mervamon is a Minerva-themed Warrior Digimon, armed with the "Olympia Kai" blade and the snake-headed "Medullia" shield, who has the habit of rushing into battle without a plan of attack. She resides in Honey Land as a rebel fighter, defending the land from its Dark General, Zamielmon, and his forces, whereas her brother Ignitemon was among his minions. After she meets the Fusion Fighters United Army in Honey Land, she decides to align with Nene.
Monitamons (モニタモンズ, Monitamonzu)
Voiced by: Yūko Maruyama (Japanese); Colleen O'Shaughnessey (English)
A group of green, computer monitor/ninja-themed Digimon originally from the Warrior Zone who are helping Nene as her spies. Despite their bumbling and comedic behavior, they are considered elites among Monitamon. Three red Monitamon encountered the Fusion Fighters in the Warrior Zone, joining Mikey to serve as a link to Monitamon.
Monimon (モニモン, Monimon)
A small green television-themed Digimon with a leaf-like antenna who is carried by Nene. It has the power to teleport itself and others short distances.
Ewan Amano (天野 ユウ, Amano Yuu)
Voiced by: Kanae Oki (Japanese); Cindy Robinson (English)
Ewan Amano is Nene's younger brother who is held hostage by SkullKnightmon. In reality, Ewan is a willing member of Team Midnight and is its true General, having used the black Fusion Loader Nene currently possesses and then receiving the Darkness Loader from SkullKnightmon to assume his place in the Bagra Army as the leader of the Midnight strikeforce. He had met his future partner Damemon for the first time on the day his grandmother died. Having been against playing with others in fear of hurting them, he was deceived by SkullKnightmon, under the notion that the Digital World is just a virtual game and destroying Digimon and humans alike have no real consequences. As a result, under the delusion that it is a game with no consequences, Ewan fettered out his hostility and became a sadist, who fights with no holds barred, even against his own sister. During the events in the Underworld battleground under Bright Land, Mikey manages to convince Ewan that SkullKnightmon is using him and tricked him into hurting others. However, SkullKnightmon abducts Ewan and imprisons him before he is saved by Mervamon. Ewan later aligned with Mikey and the rest of the Fusion Fighters United Army in the final battle against DarknessBagramon and his Darkness Loader changed into a yellow Fusion Loader.
Damemon (ダメモン, Damemon)
Voiced by: Masami Kikuchi (Japanese); Michael Sorich (Damemon), Richard Epcar (Tuwarmon) (English)
Damemon is a robotic feces-based Digimon who was originally a member of Team Midnight, recruited alongside Ewan. Accompanied by the mouse-themed ChuuChuumon (チューチューモン, Chūchūmon), he served as SkullKnightmon's third-in-command and spy within the Bagra Army by playing the role of Lalyamon's pet to occasionally sit in on meetings with Bagramon and the Three Generals, criticizing them constantly. After the Bagra Army succeeded in conquering the Digital World, Damemon is reassigned to be Ewan's personal bodyguard, but starts to care for Ewan's safety to the point of considering the idea that he must tell the boy the truth behind SkullKnightmon's lie. Tuwarmon (ツワーモン, Tsuwāmon) is Damemon's fighting form, a powerful ninja-like Digimon possessing formidable battle power, equipped with the sickle-like Mantis Arm (マンティスアーム, Mantisuāmu).
SuperStarmon (スーパースターモン, SūpāSutāmon)
Voiced by: Yūji Mitsuya
A golden star/superstar-themed Mutant Digimon and the strongest among the Starmon type Digimon, sometimes using English words in his speech. Just as Mikey's Starmon has Pickmon, SuperStarmon has his own Star Army, the members of which could combine into different shapes, which resemble the Starmon on Mikey's side.
RookChessmon (ルークチェスモン, RūkuChesumon)
A rook-themed Puppet Digimon that digivolved from a KnightChessmon that appeared on Earth by manipulating several kids in a card game. He was eventually defeated by the combined efforts of Gumdramon, Damemon and Shoutmon, and captured by Ewan.

=== Tagiru Akashi ===
Voiced by: Marina Inoue

Tagiru Akashi (明石 タギル, Akashi Tagiru) is Ewan's classmate. He owns a crimson Fusion Loader, received by the Old Clock Store Owner. His Digimon partner is Gumdramon. Tagiru is a teammate in Mikey and Ewan's Xros Heart basketball team. He is energetic and reckless and always does things without thinking, but despite his rash behavior, he risks anything to protect his friends. He holds Mikey on high regards and is determined to become as strong and reliable as him. He is hinted to have a crush on Nene. After defeating Quartzmon, he became the strongest Hunter and the seventh Legendary Hero in the Digimon Multiverse.

==== Gumdramon ====
Voiced by: Kumiko Watanabe

Gumdramon (ガムドラモン, Gamudoramon) is a tiny purple dragon-like Digimon and Tagiru's partner. While having to use him merely to obtain the power provided by a human partner, they become friends. He calls himself the Digital World's "number one wild child". Tagiru and Gumdramon are very similar as both are overly enthusiastic and reckless: just like Tagiru aims to one day surpass Mikey, Gumdramon aims to become stronger than Shoutmon.

==== Tagiru Akashi's collection ====
MetalTyrannomon (メタルティラノモン, Metarutiranomon)
Voiced by: Daisuke Kishio
A cyborg Tyrannosaurus-themed Digimon hunted by Ryouma after Gumdramon lured him into the domain. MetalTyrannomon is defeated by Arresterdramon and captured by Tagiru.
Sagomon (サゴモン)
Voiced by: Shigeru Chiba
A Kappa-like Digimon who kidnapped several insecure students from Tagiru's school, using their negative emotions to power himself in battle. He was weakened by the DigiFuse of OmniShoutmon and Dorulumon and defeated by the DigiFuse of Arresterdramon and MetalTyrannomon.
GigaBreakdramon (ギガブレイクドラモン, GigaBureikudoramon)
Voiced by: Daisuke Kishio
A massive mechanical dragon Digimon modeled after Breakdramon that was created by the robotics club at Tagiru's school with the assistance of Puppetmon. He was weakened by the DigiFuse of Shoutmon and Puppetmon and defeated by Arresterdramon, then captured by Tagiru.
Blossomon (Pink) (ブロッサモン (ピンク), Burossamon (Pinku))
Voiced by: Takeshi Kusao
A rare pink flowe-themed Digimon who offers to aid Miho Suto by getting rid of the top ten students in her class while creating a symbiotic link between them. Eventually, once exposed, Blossomon Biomerges Miho into her body. After Miho is removed from the Digimon with her hold over the girl broken, Tagiru captures Blossomon.
Kotemon (コテモン, Kotemon)
A kendo/reptile-themed Digimon whom Tagiru DigiFused onto with Gumdramon for kendo skills.
Pagumon (パグモン, Pagumon)
A deceptive in-training Digimon with a love for human food.
Harpymon (ハーピモン, Hāpimon)
Voiced by: Takahiro Sakurai
A Harpy-themed Digimon appeared before Nene's father amid his anxiety over her decision of becoming an idol in Hong Kong claiming to help him protect her but feeding off his negative emotions instead.
FlameWizardmon (フレイウィザーモン, Fureiwizāmon)
Voiced by: Daisuke Sakaguchi
A fire wizard-themed Digimon with mastery over fire-based magic, FlameWizarmon took the desires and energy from various humans including Tagiru. After Tagiru freed himself from the spell, he captures FlameWizarmon.
Ogremon (オーガモン, Ōgamon)
Voiced by: Ryūzaburō Ōtomo
An ogre-themed Digimon who loves to make ramen with Fugamon, yet is unable to create a delicious soup to keep their ramen business afloat. As a result, the two make a deal with Mr. Katsuji to supply him with their noodles if he gives them his soup for their use.
Fugamon (フーガモン, Fuugamon)
Voiced by: Yasuhiro Takato

A red Oni-themed Digimon who loves to make ramen with Ogremon (who Fugamon resembles), yet is unable to create a delicious soup to keep their ramen business afloat. As a result, the two make a deal with Mr. Katsuji to supply him with their noodles if he gives them his soup for their use.

Phelesmon (フェレスモン, Feresumon)
Voiced by: Ryō Horikawa
A Mephistopheles-themed Digimon who appear in the Human World by brainwashing several students in Taigiru's class.
Betsumon (ベツモン, Betsumon)
Voiced by: Daisuke Kishio
A cosplay-type puppet-themed Digimon who is usually wearing a Gatomon suit, Betsumon is Gumdramon's former comrade. In the past, he and Gumdramon were bandits that steal from other Digimon who are criminals. However, he ran away when Gumdramon got caught.
Ekakimon
Voiced by: Kappei Yamaguchi
A colored pencil-themed Digimon with the power to bring drawings to life, bonding with a lonely art student and bringing his drawings of cryptids to life. When the student's drawing of "The Ultimate UMA", a hybrid cryptid, started to attack them, Ekakimon realized the error of his ways and helped Tagiru and Arresterdramon stop his greatest creation before voluntarily joining them.
Dragomon (ダゴモン, Dagomon)
Voiced by: Shōzō Iizuka
A Cthulhu-themed Digimon who chased after Plesiomon.
Sakkakumon (セフィロトモン, Sefirotomon)
Voiced by: Daisuke Kishio
A sefirot-themed collaborated with Jokermon to swallow the happiness of the children that visit Digimon Land.
Jokermon (ジョーカーモン, Jōkāmon)
Voiced by: Wataru Takagi
A jester-themed worked with Sakkakumon in a plot to swallow the happiness of the children that visit Digimon Land.

=== Bagra Army ===
The Bagra Army (バグラ軍, Bagura Gun) is an evil legion of Digimon who serve as primary antagonists for the first series.

Bagramon (バグラモン, Baguramon)
Voiced by: Takeshi Kusao (Japanese); Neil Kaplan (English)
Bagramon is a Samael-themed Demon Lord Digimon who replaced half of his body with one made of a ghastly wood and a magical ruby eye that allows him to see everything in the Digital World. Bagramon attempts to keep all Code Crown fragments, in order to change the Digital World in his image. However, he is defeated by Shoutmon. At the end of the series, it is revealed that the Clock Store Owner is Bagramon's reincarnation.
Clockmon (クロックモン, Kurokkumon)
Voiced by: Yuko Maruyama
Clockmon is Bagramon's only Digimon companion while posing as his human self's Digimon partner. Resembling a traditional alarm clock, Clockmon brings together the heroes of previous series in order to aid the Fusion Fighters United Army and Digimon Hunters.
AxeKnightmon (ダークナイトモン, DākuNaitomon; DarkKnightmon in Xros Wars)
AxeKnightmon Voiced by: Jūrōta Kosugi (Japanese); Kirk Thornton (English)
Skullknightmon Voiced by: Jūrōta Kosugi (Japanese); Matthew Mercer (English)
Axemon Voiced by: Kirk Thornton
AxeKnightmon is a large, powerful black knight-themed Digimon armed with the dual-bladed Twin Lance, the younger brother of Bagramon. He is composed of the death knight-themed Digimon SkullKnightmon (スカルナイトモン, Sukarunaitomon) and the quadrupedal axe-themed Digimon Axemon (デッドリーアックスモン, Dedorīakkusumon).

==== Three Generals ====
The Three Generals (三元士, Sangenshi; Three Head Officers in Xros Wars) are three mighty Digimon that work under Bagramon and are in charge of the Zone Battalion Commanders.

Tactimon (タクティモン, Takutimon)
Voiced by: Bin Shimada (Japanese); Kirk Thornton (English)
Tactimon is an armored samurai-themed Digimon who keeps 26 Code Crown fragments. His personal weapon, Sword of Sworms (Jatetsufūjinmaru), cannot be removed from the sheath, which Bagramon sealed. He was destroyed by OmniShoutmon.
Laylamon (リリスモン, Ririsumon)
Voiced by: Houko Kuwashima (Japanese); Cindy Robinson (English)
Laylamon is a Lilith-themed Digimon and the most skilled manipulator of the Three Generals, possessing 24 Code Crown fragments. She has proved to be merciless and cunning, often using her servants to do the attacking while she stands on the sidelines. She was ultimately destroyed by Shoutmon X7 and Beelzemon.
Blastmon (ブラストモン, Burasutomon)
Voiced by: Daisuke Kishio (Japanese); Patrick Seitz (English)
Blastmon is a crystal-themed Mineral Digimon and the toughest of the Three Generals, often accompanied by a trio of Vilemon. While armed with a club-tipped tail and powerful punching and kicking attacks, Blastmon can create clones of himself out of his fragments and transfer his consciousness to them

==== Minions of the Generals ====
Troopmon (トループモン, Torūpumon)
Voiced by: Richard Epcar
The Troopmon are a group of humanoid Digimon in gas masks that serve as the basic foot soldiers of the Bagra Army, carrying bazookas in battle.
Vilemon (イビルモン, Ebirumon; Evilmon)
Vilemon #1 Voiced by: Kenji Akabane (Japanese); Liam O'Brien (English)
Vilemon #2 Voiced by: Tomohisa Hashizume (Japanese); Neil Kaplan (English)
Vilemon #3 Voiced by: Keita Toide (Japanese); Travis Willingham (English)
Three imp-like Digimon serve as the servants and messengers of Blastmon. The Vilemon are killed while protecting Laylamon during their battle with the Fusion Fighters United Army.
Ebemon (イーバモン, Ībemon)
Voiced by: Neil Kaplan

Ebemon is a cyborg alien-themed Digimon that works for Laylamon, using his beam to alter anyone's mind to think everyone around is an enemy to kill. Ebemon was destroyed by Shoutmon X4.

Machinedramon (ムゲンドラモン, Mugendoramon; Mugendramon)
Voiced by: Michael Sorich

Machinedramon is a machine dragon-themed Digimon that is summoned to the Sand Zone by Laylamon. He is destroyed by Beelzemon and Shoutmon X4K.

Arukadhimon (Ultimate) (アルカディモン完全体, Arukadimon Kanzentai)
Voiced by: Michael Sorich

Arukadhimon is an archdemon-themed Digimon that works for Lalyamon, a mythical Digimon who made a hidden nest in the Digital Airspace connecting zones together and captures whoever passes by with the intent on eating them. He is destroyed by Shoutmon.

==== Zone Battalion commanders ====
The following Digimon of the Bagra Army answer directly to the Three Generals:

MadLeomon (マッドレオモン, MaddoReomon; 1–3, 29)
Voiced by: Nobuo Tobita (Japanese); Vic Mignogna (English)
MadLeomon is an undead lion-themed Digimon who is one of Tactimon's Zone Battalion Commanders, the conqueror of the Forest Zone and the first of the Bagra Army's oppressors to encounter the Fusion Fighters. MadLeomon was originally Leomon (レオモン, Reomon), the Forest Zone's kind-hearted guardian, before being corrupted by Bagramon. MadLeomon is able to absorb other Digimon to gain new abilities and power. MadLeomon is destroyed by Shoutmon X3, but is resurrected as his original self Leomon after all the Code Crown fragments are gathered.
Neptunemon (ネプトゥーンモン, Neputūnmon; 4–6, 29)
Voiced by: Mitsuaki Madono (Japanese); Liam O'Brien (English)
Neptunmon is a Neptune/merman-like God Man Digimon who is one of Tactimon's Zone Battalion Commanders. He was killed by Shoutmon X4 using his King's Bite trident. When all the Code Crown fragments are claimed, Neptunemon is resurrected and purified, becoming the guardian of the Island Zone.
AncientVolcanomon (エンシェントボルケーモン, EnshentoBorukēmon; Ancient Volcamon) 7–9, 29
Voiced by: Kiyoyuki Yanada (Japanese); JB Blanc (English)
AncientVolcanomon is an Ancient Mineral Digimon, whose back-mounted volcano erupts whenever he is angry. When his Meramon army is defeated, AncientVolcanomon absorbs them, transforming his volcano into a chest-mounted cannon. AncientVolcanomon is destroyed in battle by Shoutmon X3. AncientVolcanomon is later resurrected and purified, becoming the guardian of the Magma Zone.
IceDevimon (アイスデビモン, AisuDebimon)
Voiced by: Yasuhiro Takato (Japanese); Patrick Seitz (English)
IceDevimon is an icy devil-themed Digimon who is one of Laylamon's Zone Battalion Commanders out of fear and assists her in attacking the Lake Zone with an army of Icemon, Pteramon, and ice bazooka-wielding Troopmon.
SkullScorpionmon (スコピオモン, Scorpiomon)
Voiced by: Neil Kaplan
SkullScorpiomon is a scorpion-themed Digimon. A gray SkullScorpiomon acted as the captain of the squadron of his species that served Blastmon as his Zone Battalion Commander in the Sand Zone. The gray SkullScorpiomon was later killed by Lalyamon, while the other SkullScorpiomon were eaten by Machinedramon.
Lucemon (ルーチェモン, Rūchemon)
Voiced by: Taiki Matsuno (Japanese); Michael Sinterniklaas (English)
Lucemon is a Lucifer-themed Digimon who is one of the Zone Battalion Commanders of Laylamon and is sent to the Sky Zone to obtain the Code Crown fragment. As only the president of the Sky Zone can access the Code Crown fragment from the shrine hidden deep within the Sky Zone, Lucemon sets up an alliance with Nene where she is promised the corruptive Phantom Mist that is sealed in the shrine. From there, assuming his childlike angel rookie form, Lucemon presents himself as one wanting to better life for everyone. Through the Phantom Mist poisoning SlushAngemon and the Fusion Fighters supporting him, Lucemon receives the adoration of all Sky Zone inhabitants needed for him to become president. However, once made president of the Sky Zone, Lucemon revealed his true nature as the Demon Lord Digimon Lucemon Chaos Mode (ルーチェモンフォールダウンモード, Rūchemon Fōrudaun Mōdo; Lucemon Falldown Mode). After absorbing the Phantom Mist, Lucemon becomes the draconic Demon God Digimon Lucemon Wild Mode (ルーチェモンサタンモード, Rūchemon Satan Mōdo; Lucemon Satan Mode). Lucemon becomes a mindless beast and consumes the Sky Zone, only to be destroyed by Shoutmon.
Kongoumon (コンゴウモン, Kongōmon)
Voiced by: Tetsu Inada (Japanese); Matthew Mercer (English)
Kongoumon is a gold beetle-themed Insect Digimon who is the Zone Battalio Commander of the Bagra Army within the Jungle Zone and a servant of Tactimon.
Musyamon (ムシャモン, Mushamon)
Voiced by: Takashi Nagasako (Japanese); Travis Willingham (English)
Musyamon is a samurai-themed Wizard Digimon who serves Blastmon and is the Zone Battalion Commander of the Bagra Army within the Warrior Zone. Musyamon, alongside Shurimon, Asuramon, and Samudramon, are destroyed by Shoutmon.
Matadormon (マタドゥルモン, Matadurumon; Matadrmon)
Voiced by: Hiroaki Hirata (Japanese); Matthew Mercer (English)
Matadormon is an Undead matador/Flamenco-themed Digimon who is the Zone Battalion Commander of the Sweets Zone and a subordinate of Tactimon, using his army of Monzaemon to subjugate the zone and sending the populace underground while keeping the chefs in his dungeon to bake for him. But Matadormon's true objective in the zone is to awaken Breakdramon, the Digimon responsible for the Digital World's current state.
Grademon (グレイドモン, Gureidomon)
Voiced by: Ryōtarō Okiayu (Japanese); Christopher Corey Smith (English)
A corrupted knight-themed Warrior Digimon who once served as the Bagra Army's Zone Battalion Commander of the Sword Zone. He attacked the Fusion Fighters with an army of Dinohyumon and Troopmon after Mikey found the Sword Zone's Code Crown fragment. After suffering a near-fatal defeat at the hands of Shoutmon X4, he was healed and purified by Mikey's Code Crown fragments.

==== Dark Generals ====
The Dark Generals (デスジェネラル, Desu Jeneraru; Death Generals in Xros Wars) are the seven most powerful Digimon in the Bagra Army and the Digital World, and are the rulers of the seven kingdoms surrounding the Bagra Fortress, serving under Bagramon and SkullKnightmon. The Dark Generals are assigned the task of collecting a large supply of negative emotion from the Digimon they terrorize to fuel the Code Crown in preparation for D5, a future day of destruction.

Dorbickmon the Fire-fury (火烈のドルビックモン, Karetsu no Dorubikkumon)
Voiced by: Hideyuki Hori (Japanese); Grant George (English)
A Welsh Dragon-themed Digimon and the ruler of Dragon Land (ドラゴンランド, Doragon Rando), able to freely manipulate the environment to his advantage. He was destroyed by ZekeGreymon.
NeoMyotismon the Moonlight (月光のネオヴァンデモン, Gekkou no NeoVandemon; NeoVandemon the Moonlight in Xros Wars)
Voiced by: Takaya Kuroda (Japanese); Neil Kaplan (English)
NeoMyotismon is a vampire-themed Digimon and the ruler of Vampire Land (ヴァンパイアランド, Vanpaia Rando). Using his army of Devimon and LadyDevimon to gather Lopmon in his domain, NeoMyotismon has been using his Darkness Loader to absorb them to make himself immortal. He was destroyed by Shoutmon DX.
Zamielmon the Wood-spirit (木精のザミエールモン, Mokusei no Zamiērumon)
Voiced by: Kazuki Yao (Japanese); Derek Stephen Prince (English)
Zamielmon is a hunter-themed Demon Man Digimon with arrow-themed armor and the ruler of Honey Land (ハニーランド, Hanī Rando). He has the title of Lord. He was destroyed by Shoutmon DX with JetMervamon's assistance.
Splashmon the Water Tiger (水虎のスプラッシュモン, Suiko no Supurasshumon)
Voiced by: Hikaru Midorikawa (Japanese); Christopher Corey Smith (English)
Splashmon is a humanoid liquid-themed Aquatic Beast Man Digimon in a metallic bodysuit and the ruler of Cyber Land (サイバーランド, Saibā Rando). Splashmon is a shapeshifter who used his abilities along with his familiars, called Splashers (ドリッピン, Dorippin; Drippins), to stir mistrust among the original occupants of Cyber Land before tricking them into destroying each other. Splashmon can DigiFuse with his Splashers to become the muscular Splashmon Darkness Mode (スプラッシュモンダークネスモード, Supurasshumondākunesumōdo) and can also assume Splashmon Darkness Mode #2 (スプラッシュモンダークネスモード, Supurasshumondākunesumōdo) which resembles a large watery tiger. He was destroyed by Shoutmon DX.
Olegmon the Gold Pirate (金賊のオレーグモン, Kinzoku no Orēgumon; Olegmon the Gold-thief in Xros Wars)
Olegmon Voiced by: Kōzō Shioya (Japanese); Patrick Seitz (English)
Surtr Voiced by: Daisuke Kishio (Japanese); Neil Kaplan (English)
Jormungand Voiced by: Takahiro Sakurai (Japanese); Richard Epcar (English)
Olegmon is a Viking-based Sea Animal Digimon and the ruler of Gold Land (ゴールドランド, Gōrudo Rando). Armed with his Dual Tomahawk battleaxes (Twin Broadswords in the English dub), Olegmon is a super-heavyweight Digimon whose body is clad in golden-steel armor with the treasure chests on his shoulders holding the happy shadow Surtr (スルト, Suruto) and the gloomy shadow Jormungand (ヨルムンガンド, Yorumungando). He overpowered Shoutmon X4S, but was eventually destroyed by Ballistamon.
Gravimon the Earth Spirit (土神のグラビモン, Doshin no Gurabimon; Gravimon the Earth-god in Xros Wars)
Voiced by: Shigeru Nakahara (Japanese); Brian Beacock (English)
Gravimon is the disproportional humanoid ruler of Canyon Land (キャニオンランド, Kyanion Rando). He is a strategist who manipulates gravity and tends to be a step ahead of his opponents, transplanting his DigiCore into an opponent to have the advantage to regenerate indefinitely as long as his core is unharmed. He was destroyed by Shoutmon X7 and Christoper.
Apollomon the Sun (日輪のアポロモン, Nichirin no Aporomon; lit. Apollomon the Sun-wheel)
Apollomon Voiced by: Hideyuki Tanaka (Japanese); Kirk Thornton (English)
Whispered Voiced by: Hideyuki Tanaka (Japanese); Keith Silverstein (English)
Apollomon is an Apollo/fire lion-based God Man Digimon and who believes in justice before he was forced into serving Bagramon and SkullKnightmon as the seventh Dark General and the ruler of Bright Land (ブライトランド, Buraito Rando).Whispered (ウィスパード, Wisupādo) is a virus program created by Bagramon to control Apollomon as he attempts to resist it. He was destroyed by Shoutmon X7.
GrandGeneramon (グランドジェネラモン, Gurandojeneramon)
GrandGeneramon is a Gestalt-themed Unique Digimon, whom is the combined forms of all seven Dark Generals. Called by AxeKnightmon to be the strongest and most evil of destructive gods, GrandGeneramon has the head and chest of Dorbickmon, the wings and left arm of NeoMyotismon, the abdomen and tail of Zamielmon, the body of Splashmon Darkness Mode #2 as its lower half, the right arm of Olegmon, the right arm of Gravimon with its chest and tentacles as the shoulder, and the crest and left arm of Apollomon.

==== Bagra Army soldiers ====
Besides the Troopmon, among the soldiers of the Bagra Army are:

Pteramon (プテラノモン, Puteranomon; 1–3, 10, 54)
A group of Pteranodon/fighter aircraft-themed Digimon that serve as the air force of the Bagra Army.
Rhinomon (ライノモン, Rainomon)
A group of rhinoceros-themed Digimon that serve as the steeds for the Bagra Army.
Tankmon (タンクモン, Tankumon)
A tank-themed Digimon first appeared in Mikey's dream of his army fighting the Bagra Army. Lilithmon and Damemon later brought an army of Tankmon to attack the Fusion Fighters and Team Blue Flare in the Dust Zone.
Chikurimon (チクリモン, Chikurimon)
A group of spore-like Digimon that serve as the foot soldiers of the Bagra Army.
Mammothmon (マンモン, Manmon)
A group of mammoth-themed Digimon who serve as the steeds for the Bagra Army.
Minotarumon (ミノタルモン, Minotarumon; 1–2, 54)
A Minotaur-themed Digimon who was seen in Mikey's dream of his army fighting the Bagra Army. Four of them pushed the cage containing Orochimon. Several Minotarumon serve the Bagra Army.
Bulbmon (バルブモン, Barubumon)
A valve-themed Digimon who was first seen in Mikey's dream where his army was fighting the Bagra Army. A Bulbmon is later summoned to the Disc Zone by Blastmon to battle against Mikey and Christopher.
Sealsdramon (シールズドラモン, Shīruzudoramon)
A dragon/SEAL-themed Digimon who first appeared in Mikey's dream of his army fighting the Bagra Army. Robotic duplicates of Sealsdramon make up Splashmon's army.
Coelamon (シーラモン, Shīramon)
Voiced by: Tomohisa Hashizume
An Earth-swimming coelacanth-themed Digimon that tried to attack Angie and Cutemon, but was deleted by Dorulumon.
Orochimon (オロチモン)
A Yamata no Orochi-themed Digimon that was used by MadLeomon to eliminate the Fusion Fighters.
Drimogemon (ドリモゲモン, Dorimogemon)
A drill-nosed mole-themed Digimon that was unleashed by Tactimon and MadLeomon to burrow under the Village of Smiles and awaken a dormant bamboo root that sprouted bamboo all over the Village of Smiles. Once Drimogemon was destroyed by Jeremy using the Star Sword, the bamboo withdrew.
Apemon (ハヌモン, Hanumon)
Several ape-themed Digimon that accompanied MadLeomon in his attack on the Village of Smiles.
Mantaraymon (マンタレイモン, Mantareimon; 4–6)
Several manta ray-themed Digimon larger than normal are shown to have been modified with armor resembling aircraft carriers. They make up Neptunemon's fleet.
Gizamon (ギザモン, Gizamon; 4–6)
Voiced by: Ichitarō Ai (Japanese); Joe Ochman (English)
Several frog-themed Digimon who make up Neptunemon's army. One serves as Neptunemon's right-hand man.
Divermon (ハンギョモン, Hangyomon)
Voiced by: Masato Obara (Japanese); Patrick Seitz (English)
Several piscine humanoids who make up Neptunemon's army.
Octomon (オクタモン, Okutamon)
Voiced by: Neil Kaplan
An octopus-themed Digimon that was unleashed by Neptunemon after the Fusion Fighters hijacked one of the Mantaraymon. It was destroyed by Shoutmon X2.
Flymon (フライモン, Furaimon)
Voiced by: Yūsuke Numata (Japanese); Derek Stephen Prince (English)
A swarm of bee-fly-themed Digimon that were unleashed by Neptunemon in order to get into KingWhamon.
Ebidramon (エビドラモン, Ebidoramon)
Voiced by: Patrick Seitz
A lobster/dragon-themed Digimon that was unleashed by Neptunemon to claim the Island Zone's Code Crown fragment from Mikey. When it had Shoutmon X2 trapped in its claws, Mikey activated the Leviamon DigiCard to free Shoutmon, who destroyed Ebidramon.
Seadramon (シードラモン, Shīdoramon; 5–6)
Several sea dragon-themed Digimon were summoned by Neptunemon to attack the Fusion Fighters.
SkullMeramon (デスメラモン, DesuMeramon; DeathMeramon; 7-9)
Voiced by: Tomohisa Asō (Japanese); Doug Erholtz (English)
A humanoid fire-themed Digimon that serves as one of AncientVolcanomon's lieutenants. After destroying BlueMeramon, SkullMeramon was destroyed by Shoutmon.
BlueMeramon (ブルーメラモン, BurūMeramon; 7–9)
Voiced by: Hiroaki Miura (Japanese); Sam Riegel (English)
A blue fire spirit-themed Digimon that resembles of Meramon. BlueMeramon serves as one of AncientVolcanomon's lieutenants. He knew Dorulumon back when he was a member of the Bagra Army three years ago, owing his life to him for saving him from being sacrificed in Tactimon's plan to conquer a zone that was neighboring the Magma Zone. He later helps the Fusion Fighters to free Mikey and Dorulumon from AncientVolcanomon and dies after taking an attack from SkullMeramon that was meant for Dorulumon.
RedMeramon (シードラモン, Shīdoramon; 7–9)
Voiced by: Kenji Akabane (Japanese); Benjamin Diskin, Kyle Hebert, Neil Kaplan, R. Martin Klein, Matthew Mercer, Christopher Corey Smith (English)
Several fire spirit-themed Digimon who make up AncientVolcanoamon's army. Most of the Meramon were destroyed during their fight with the Fusion Fighters. The remaining Meramon were absorbed by AncientVolcamon.
Frigimon (ユキダルモン, Yukidarumon; 7 and 8)
Several Snowman/bear-themed Digimon were used by SkullMeramon to cool down AncientVolcanomon when he overheats in anger.
Icemon (アイスモン, Aisumon)
Voiced by: Joe Ochman, Patrick Seitz
Several ice-themed Digimon that resemble a recolored Gotsumon who make up IceDevimon's army during his attack on Persiamon's palace. Some Icemon were absorbed by IceDevimon to become IceDevimon-Daipenmon Enhancement.
Daipenmon (ダイペンモン, Daipenmon)
A gigantic penguin/kakigōri machine-themed with a popsicle mixer on its head and wields two popsicles as weapons. Daipenmon was fused with IceDevimon to become IceDevimon-Daipenmon Enhancement. The hybrid was destroyed by Shoutmon X4K.
MegaKabuterimon Blue (アトラーカブテリモン 青, AtorāKabuterimon ao)
Several blue Japanese rhinoceros beetle-themed Digimon that comprise Kongoumon's army.
GranKuwagamon (グランクワガーモン, GuranKuwagāmon)
Many Dorcus grandis-themed Digimon that comprise the aerial fleet of Kongoumon's army.
Shurimon (シュリモン, Shurimon)
Voiced by: Steve Kramer
A blue and brown ninja/shuriken-themed Digimon serves as Musyamon's second-in-command. He was destroyed by Shoutmon.
Etemon (エテモン, Etemon)
Voiced by: Yoshiyuki Kuono (Japanese); Richard Epcar (English)
Ultimate Level monkey-suited chimpanzee-themed Puppet Digimon, a group of Ninja Etemon work under Shurimon as his eyes and ears to oversee the Monitamon.
Kotemon (コテモン, Kotemon)
A kendo/reptile-themed Digimon serves as one of the guards of Musyamon's palace, defeated by Jeremy using the Rare Star Sword.
Asuramon (アシュラモン, Ashuramon)
Voiced by: Derek Stephen Prince
An Asura-themed Digimon is seen as a member of Musyamon's army. He was destroyed by Shoutmon.
Samudramon (ガイオウモン, Gaiōmon)
Voiced by: Neil Kaplan
A dragon/samurai-themed Digimon is seen as a member of Musyamon's army. He was destroyed by Shoutmon.
Ninjamon (イガモン, Igamon)
Voiced by: Tomohisa Hashizume
Several ninja-themed make up Musyamon's foot soldiers, some aiding in the attack on the Fusion Fighters while the rest assisted Kabukimon in fighting Dorulumon.
Kabukimon (カブキモン)
Voiced by: Kenji Akabane (Japanese); Kirk Thornton (English)
A Kabuki/flower-themed digimon serves as one of the guards of Musyamon's palace.
Caturamon (チャツラモン, Chatsuramon)
Voiced by: Derek Stephen Prince
A Shisa-themed Digimon serves as one of the guards of Musyamon's palace.
Monzaemon (もんざえモン, Monzaemon)
Voiced by: Haruo Satou (Japanese); Kyle Hebert (English)
A horde of teddy bear-themed Digimon make up Matadormon's army and was led by eyepatch-wearing Monzaemon. They are all absorbed by WaruMonzaemon to form GigaWaruMonzaemon.
WaruMonzaemon (ワルもんざえモン, WaruMonzaemon)
Voiced by: Osamu Ryūtani (Japanese); Neil Kaplan (English)
A wicked teddy bear-themed Digimon with claws on its left hand who serves as Matadormon's pastry chef. Under Matadormon's orders, he fuses with the Monzaemon Patrol to form GigaWaruMonzaemon which resembles a giant version of WaruMonzaemon with serrated claws. He was destroyed by Shoutmon X4S.
Breakdramon (ブレイクドラモン, Bureikudoramon)
Voiced by: Kōhei Fukuhara
A giant mechanical dragon-themed Digimon that is found in slumber below the Sweets Zone. It was destroyed by Shoutmon
Raremon (レアモン, Reamon)
Several undead flesh blob-themed make up Matadormon's army. Some of them were actually transformed prisoners of Matadormon and were restored to their normal forms following the destruction of Matadormon and Breakdramon.
Dinohyumon (ディノヒューモン, Dinohyūmon)
Several dinosauroid-themed Digimon make up Grademon's army.
Huanglongmon (ファンロンモン, Fanronmon)
Voiced by: Kentarō Itō (Japanese); Travis Willingham (English)
A Yellow Dragon-themed serves as Dorbickmon's second-in-command. Dorbickmon can combine with Huanglongmon to become Dorbickmon Darkness Mode which has a Nuckelavee-like build and serves as Dorbickmon's mode of transportation.
Devidramon (デビドラモン, Debidoramon)
Voiced by: Tomohisa Hashizume (Japanese); Richard Epcar (English)
Two devil/dragon-themed Digimon who serve in Dorbickmon's army.
Megadramon (メガドラモン, Megadoramon)
Several dragon-themed Digimon with snake tails instead of back legs who make up Dorbickmon's army.
Flarizamon (フレアリザモン, Furearizamon)
Several fiery lizard-themed Digimon who make up Dorbickmon's army.
Brachiomon (ブラキモン, Burakimon)
Several Brachiosaurus-themed Digimon who make up Dorbickmon's army.
DarkTyrannomon (ダークティラノモン, Dākutiranomon)
Several Tyrannosaurus-themed Digimon who make up Dorbickmon's army. Destroyed by OmniShoutmon.
Salamandermon (サラマンダモン, Saramandamon)
Several salamander-themed Digimon make up Dorbickmon's army. Destroyed by OmniShoutmon.
Gigadramon (ギガドラモン, Gigadoramon)
Several dragon-themed Digimon with snake tails instead of back legs who make up Dorbickmon's army.
LadyDevimon (レディーデビモン, Redīdebimon)
Voiced by: Kazue Ikara, Miho Saiki, Yuka Saitō (Japanese); Erin Fitzgerald, Mary Elizabeth McGlynn, Cindy Robinson (English)
Several female devil-themd Digimon who make up NeoMyotismon's army.
Devimon (デビモン, Debimon)
Several devil-themed Digimon who make up NeoMyotismon's army.
GrandisKuwagamon (グランディスクワガーモン, GurandisuKuwagāmon)
Voiced by: Daisuke Kishio (Japanese); Christopher Corey Smith (English)
A humanoid dorcus grandis-themed Digimon who is Zamielmon's second-in-command. He was the one who told Zamielmon that the Fusion Fighters United Army were responsible for defeating Dorbickmon and NeoMyotismon. Zamielmon DigiFused him with the Honeybeemon to form GrandisKuawagamon Honeybee Mode, who is destroyed by JetMervamon.
Honeybeemon (ハニービーモン, Honībīmon)
Voiced by: Kenji Akabane, Tomohisa Hashizume
Several honey bee-themed Digimon who make up Zamielmon's army.
Blossomon (ブロッサモン, Burossamon)
Voiced by: Tomohisa Hashizume
Several flower-themed Digimon who make up Zamielmon's army.
Flybeemon (フライビーモン, Furaibīmon)
Several dragonfly/Ichneumonidae make up Zamielmon's army.
Mermaimon (マーメイモン, Māmeimon)
Voiced by: Yuka Shioyama (Japanese); Laura Bailey (English)
A mermaid-like Seabeast Digimon who serves as Olegmon's first mate and second-in-command, armed with an anchor as her weapon. Mermaimon was destroyed by JetMervamon.
Scorpiomon (アノマロカリモン, Anomarokarimon)
Voiced by: Kenji Akabane, Tomohisa Hashizume
A bunch of Anomalocaris-themed Digimon make up Olegmon's crew. Several of them are destroyed by Cyberdramon.
MarineDevimon (マリンデビモン, Marindebimon)
A bunch of marine devil/squid-themed Digimon who make up Olegmon's crew.
Depthmon (デプスモン, Depusumon)
Voiced by: Michael Sorich
A bunch of dragon/merman-themed Digimon who make up Olegmon's crew.
Anubismon (アヌビモン, Anubimon)
Voiced by: Kenji Akabane (Japanese); Neil Kaplan, Michael Sorich (English)
Several Anubis-themed Digimon who serve as Gravimon's bodyguards and soldiers.
Centarumon (ケンタルモン, Kentarumon)
Voiced by: Kenji Akabane, Tomohisa Hashaizume (Japanese); Patrick Seitz (English)
A group of centaur-themed Digimon who make up the reserve forces of Gravimon's army.
Cerberusmon (ケルベロモン, Keruberomon)
A group of Cerberus-themed Digimon who make up the initial forces of Gravimon's army.
Hippogriffomon (ヒポグリフォモン, Hipogurifomon)
A group of Hippogriff-themed Digimon who make up the initial forces of Gravimon's army.
Sagittarimon (サジタリモン, Sajitarimon)
Voiced by: Hiromu Miyazaki
A group of dragon/centaur-themed Digimon who make up the reserve forces of Gravimon's army.
Wendigomon (ウェンディモン, Wendimon)
Voiced by: Keiji Hirai (Japanese); Johnny Yong Bosch (English)
A group of Wendigo-themed Digimon who make up the initial forces of Gravimon's army.
Eaglemon (クロスモン, Kurosumon)
A group of humanoid eagle-themed Digimon who make up part of Gravimon's army.
Thunderbirdmon (サンダーバーモン, Sandābāmon)
A group of Thunderbird-themed Digimon who make up a part of Gravimon's army.
Marusumon (マルスモン)
Voiced by: Eiji Takemoto
Marusumon is a Mars-themed God Man Digimon who is one of Apollomon's captains, escorting the Fusion Fighters United Army to have an audience with Apollomon. Marusumon is later killed by Whispered.
Sethmon (セトモン, Setomon)
Voiced by: Ryūzaburō Ōtomo (Japanese); Todd Haberkorn (English)

Sethmon is a Set animal-themed Digimon who is one of Apollomon's captains, though his loyalties were more to Whispered.

Dobermon (ドーベルモン, Dōberumon)
A group of Dobermann-themed Digimon who make up part of Apollomon's army.
Grizzlymon (グリズモン, Gurizumon)
A group of grizzly bear-themed Digimon who make up part of Apollomon's army.
Reppamon (レッパモン)
A group of Kamaitachi-themed Digimon who make up part of Apollomon's army.
Gorillamon (ゴリモン, Gorimon)
Voiced by: Keiichirou Yamamoto
A group of gorilla-themed Digimon who make up part of Apollomon's army.
Oryxmon (ゴートモン, Gōtomon)
A group of goat-themed Digimon make up part of Apollomon's army.
Bullmon (ブルモン, Burumon)
A group of bull-themed Digimon make up part of Apollomon's army.
RookChessmon (ルークチェスモン, Rūkuchesumon)
The RookChessmon served as the lines of defense for the Fusion Power Plant.
KnightChessmon Black (ナイトチェスモン 黒, Naitochesumon kuro)
The KnightChessmon served as the lines of defense for the Fusion Power Plant.
BishopChessmon (ビショップチェスモン, Bishoppuchesumon)
A black BishopChessmon is one of the lines of defense for the Fusion Power Plant.

=== Other characters ===
==== Ally Digimon ====
Various Digimon who aided the Fusion Fighters throughout their travels.

Archelomon (アーケロモン, Ākeromon)
Voiced by: Tomomichi Nishimura (Japanese); R. Martin Klein (English)
A large Archelon-themed Digimon who is the elder of an island in the Island Zone, and an old friend of Jijimon.
Shakomon (シャコモン)
Voiced by: Kokoro Kikuchi (Japanese); Laura Bailey (English)
A clam-themed Digimon who is one of the inhabitants of the Island Zone.
Pukamon (プカモン)
Voiced by: Ichitarō Ai (Japanese); R. Martin Klein (English)
A seal-type Digimon who is one of the inhabitants of the Island Zone.
KingWhamon (キングホエーモン, KinguHoēmon)
Voiced by: Unknown (Japanese); JB Blanc (English)
A gigantic whale Digimon whose face and back makes up the entire Island Zone.
Pharaohmon (ファラオモン, Faraomon)
Voiced by: Chō (Japanese); JB Blanc (English)
Pharaohmon is the ruler of the Sand Zone. He is a Pharaoh-themed Digimon and curses any intruder who enters his tomb.
Shakkoumon (シャッコウモン, Shakkōmon)
Voiced by: Yuko Maruyama (Japanese); Mary Elizabeth McGlynn (English)
A human-sized Dogū-like Digimon who is the Commissioner of Elections in the Sky Zone. Shakkoumon initially presented himself a shady enigma to the Fusion Fighters when he first saves Mikey's life and warns him and his friends of unseen dangers before later seen observing various events from a distance.
SlushAngemon (スラッシュエンジェモン, Surasshuenjemon)
Voiced by: Nobuyuki Hiyama (Japanese); Christopher Corey Smith (English)
SlushAngemon is a bladed-armed angel-themed Digimon who is the chief of the Sky Zone's Angel Police and the Sky Zone's former President who was briefly succeeded by Lucemon.
Gargoylemon (ガーゴモン, Gāgomon)
Voiced by: Masaharu Satō (Japanese); Liam O'Brien (English)
Gargoylemon is a gargoyle-themed inspector working for the Sky Zone's Angel Police. He is prone to jumping to conclusions.
Stingmon (スティングモン, Sutingumon)
Voiced by: Yūsei Oda (Japanese); Christopher Corey Smith (English)
A green insectoid-like Digimon who lives in the Jungle Zone and is the sworn guardian of Deckerdramon, becoming the Zone's protector after Deckerdramon joins Blue Flare.
Lilamon (ライラモン, Rairamon)
Voiced by: Rumi Kasahara (Japanese); Cindy Robinson (English)

A lilac/fairy-themed Digimon who lives in the Jungle Zone. She aids Stingmon out of love and proclaims herself as the Battle Cry Forest's Warrior of Love.

Garbagemon (ガーベモン, Gābemon)
Voiced by: Keiichi Kuwabara (Japanese); Kirk Thornton (English)
A waste-themed resident who leads a gang of MetalMamemon, ShadowToyAgumon, and a Trailmon Kettle.
Monitamon Elder (モニタモン長老, Monitamon Chōrō)
Voiced by: Masami Kikuchi (Japanese); Michael Sorich (English)
A Monitamon that is the leader of the Monitamon in the Warrior Zone.
Karatenmon (カラテンモン)
Voiced by: Jōji Yanami (Japanese); Travis Willingham (English)
A Karasu-tengu-themed Digimon that resides in the mountains of the Warrior Zone.
Lunamon (ルナモン, Runamon)
Voiced by: Hiromi Konno (Japanese); Cindy Robinson (English)
A tiny rex rabbit-themed Digimon who lives in Disc Zone.
Spadamon (スパーダモン, Supādamon)
Voiced by: Asami Sanada (Japanese); Michelle Ruff (English)

An armored lion-themed Digimon living in Sweets Zone.

Coronamon (コロナモン, Koronamon)
Voiced by: Fumiko Inoue (Japanese); Bryce Papenbrook (English)
A fire lion-themed Digimon who resides in the Sweets Zone.
Cutemon's Mom and Dad
Cutemon's Dad (キュートモン パパ, Kyūtomon Papa) Voiced by: Keisuke Baba (Japanese); Benjamin Diskin (English)
Cutemon's Mom (キュートモン ママ, Kyūtomon Mama) Voiced by: Fumiko Inoue (Japanese); Melissa Fahn (English)
Cutemon's parents, who were captured by the Bagra Army, but Cutemon frees them.
Ignitemon (イグニートモン, Igunītomon)
Voiced by: Daisuke Sakaguchi (Japanese); Brianne Siddall (English)
An iguana-armored resident of Honey Land, Mervamon's brother, and Zamielmon's soldier. During Zamielmon's fight with Mervamon, Ignitemon rode GrandisKuwagamon Honeybee Mode until he was forcefully dragged off it by Nene and Sparrowmon. He has since returned to Mervamon's side.

=== Legendary Digimon ===
Fifteen powerful warriors attempted to stop the Digital World from being split into pieces. Upon their defeat, their spirits were imprisoned in tiny memory cards, called DigiCards or DigiMemories, which could be harnessed by a Fusion Loader and used to summon the warrior for one attack. While the others were scattered across the Digital World's Zones, the DigiCards holding Examon and WarGreymon were trapped in the space between dimensions, while Omnimon ended up on Earth, where he played a role in Mikey gaining his Fusion Loader. After Mikey reclaims the Code Crown from DarknessBagramon, the Legendary Digimon within the DigiCards are all revived and help in the final battle against DarknessBagramon. The DigiCards are made up of them.

Omnimon (オメガモン, Omegamon)
Voiced by: Bin Shimada (Japanese); Matthew Mercer (English)
The knight-themed leader of the Legendary Digimon that attempted to prevent the splitting of the Digital World, his DigiCard ended up in Kyoto. Though he retained sentience as a DigiCard, Omnimon can project his spirit at will for short periods of time without the usage of a Fusion Loader. Though he hid himself away, Omnimon is the one who gave Mikey his Fusion Loader and later revealed himself to Mikey and Shoutmon before sending them back to the Digital World after the final battle with Tactimon. His attack is said to be Omni Blast.
Leviamon (リヴァイアモン, Rivaiamon)
Voiced by: Unknown (Japanese); Kirk Thornton (English)

A leviathan/crocodile-themed Digimon. Regarded as the most dangerous and powerful of the Legendary Digimon, Leviamon can use his Shell Shock attack when summoned. Mikey first activated Leviamon's DigiCard to free Shoutmon X2 from Ebidramon.

MarineAngemon (マリンエンジェモン, Marin'Enjemon; MarinAngemon)
Voiced by: Laura Bailey
A group of clione-themed Digimon who use their Kahuna Wave attacks. Mikey first activated their DigiCard to distract Neptunemon's Seadramon troops.
3 Agumon (アグモン)
Three Tyrannosauridae-themed Digimon use their Triple Baby Flame attack. Mikey first activated this DigiCard in order to distract AncientVolcanomon so that Shoutmon X4 can land the final blow on him.
Garurumon (ガルルモン)
A wolf-themed Digimon uses its Fox Fire attack. Mikey first activated its DigiCard in order to save Dorulumon from Fused AncientVolcanomon.
MagnaAngemon (ホーリーエンジェモン, HōrīEnjemon; HolyAngemon; 12, 54)
An angel-themed Digimon. Using Great Golden Gate attack when summoned, Mikey first activated MagnaAngemon's DigiCard to send Blastmon's SkullScorpionmon army out of the Sand Zone's ruins.
Veemon (ブイモン, Buimon; V-mon; 12, 54)
A dragon-themed Digimon uses his Veemon Cluster Head attack. It was never used, but Beastmon managed to hold on to it.
Guilmon (ギルモン, Girumon)
A therapod dinosaur-themed uses its Quake-A-Lator attack. Mikey first activated its DigiCard to bring down a wall in the Silica Ruins.
3 Patamon (パタモン)
Three bat-winged guinea pig-themed Digimon who use their Breeze Blaster attacks. Mikey first activated their DigiCard to help Shoutmon X4 get up to Lucemon Wild Mode without the need of flight.
MetalGarurumon (メタルガルルモン, MetaruGarurumon)
A cyborg wolf-themed Digimon uses its Metal Wolf Claw attack. Mikey first activated its DigiCard to freeze the Tankmon that came with Laylamon.
Darkdramon (ダークドラモン, Dākudoramon)
Voiced by: Joe Ochman
A dark dragon-themed uses its Gigastick Lance attack. Mikey first activated its DigiCard to help Shoutmon destroy Arukadhimon and, later, to attack Tactimon while on Earth.
Impmon (インプモン, Inpumon)
An imp-themed Digimon uses its Pillar of Fire attack. Mikey first activated its DigiCard to hold off Musyamon's soldiers led by Shurimon, his second-in-command.
Gatomon (テイルモン, Teirumon; Tailmon; 32, 54)
A cat-themed Digimon who uses its Neko Scratch attack. Mikey first activated its DigiCard in order to get out of a cave that Dorbickmon's Salamandermon flooded with lava.
Examon (エグザモン, Eguzamon)
A Welsh Dragon-themed Digimon with large wings. His DigiCard alongside WarGreymon's DigiCard ended up adrift in Digital Space.
WarGreymon (ウォーグレイモン, WōGureimon).
A dinosauroid-themed Digimon. His DigiCard alongside Examon's DigiCard ended up adrift in Digital Space.

==== Returning characters ====
Originally from the previous Digimon series, they were rounded up by the Old Clock Shop Man by using his Clockmon for the final battle with Quartzmon.

Taichi "Tai" Kamiya (八神 太一, Yagami Taichi; Taichi Yagami)
Voiced by: Toshiko Fujita
Tai Kamiya appears in Digimon Adventures as the primary protagonist and the de facto leader of the DigiDestined during their summer adventure in 1999. Being happy-go-lucky and adventurous, yet naïve, Tai often acts on impulse without realizing the consequences of his actions. However, he does whatever is necessary to rectify it and protect those dear to him. To counter Quartzmon, the Old Clock Shop Man summons Tai, from a moment of time prior to sacrifice his crest after the events of his adventure, alongside the other team leaders during his challenge to the Digimon Hunters.
Agumon (アグモン, Agumon)
Voiced by: Chika Sakamoto
Agumon is a Tyrannosauridae-like Digimon and Tai's companion.
Matt Ishida (石田ヤマト, Ishida Yamato; Yamato Ishida)
Matt Ishida is a loner from Digimon Adventure who is regarded as "cool" by his peers and seen as a "born rebel" who "prefers to do things his own way." Behind his façade, Matt has an "introspective, sensitive side" that comes through around his younger brother T.K. Takaishi. Though he clashed with Tai over the series, Matt manages to overcome his personal demons prior to joining Tai in the final fight with Piedmon. Matt is one of the legendary Generals in Digimon Xros Wars: Super Digicard Battle.
Gabumon (ガブモン, Gabumon)
Gabumon is a reptile Digimon in a wolf-like pelt who is very loyal to Matt, giving him free rein to find himself but trying to reason with him whenever Matt falls too far. His utter devotion to help Matt on his journey of self-discovery led to him going against the rest of the DigiDestined. He later saves Matt from going down the spiral of self-destruction.
Tentomon (テントモン, Tentomon)
Voiced by: Takahiro Sakurai
Tentomon is a ladybug-themd Insect Digimon who is the witty partner of Izzy Izumi, whose intelligence he admires. When Angie and Jeremy mistake Omnimon, Imperialdramon, and Susanoomon for DigiFuses, Tentomon corrects them about their Digivolution methods.
Mimi Tachikawa (太刀川 ミミ, Tachikawa Mimi)
Voiced by: Ai Maeda
Mimi Tachikawa is a girly girl from Digimon Adventure who is very blunt and outspoken despite her complaining and self-centeredness. Despite being horribly out of touch with reality at points, Mimi was the more effected of the DigiDestined to the point of refusing to fight out of seeing their Digimon friends getting killed because of them. However, she ultimately realizes her duty to save the Digital World and played a role in the destruction of Piedmon with the army of Digimon friends she gathered. She makes her appearance in this series where she and Rika Nonaka meet Nene and Christopher in Hong Kong's DigiQuartz before going to Greece.
Palmon (パルモン, Parumon)
Palmon is a plant/reptile-themed Digimon with reptile features, one of the few who see the good in Mimi, helping her appreciate what she has and to deal with what life gave her.
Joe Kido (城戸 丈, Kido Jō; Jou Kido)
Voiced by: Kikuchi Masami
Joe Kido is from a family of doctors from Digimon Adventure. He uses his expertise to as both medic and a leader while he and Mimi separated from the others, but finally reunited with them just in time for the battle against Piedmon and later Apocalymon. He and Gomamon are sent to safeguard Mexico from DigiQuartz expansion.
Gomamon (ゴマモン, Gomamon)
Voiced by: Junko Takeuchi
Gomamon is a sea lion/sea otter-themed Sea-Animal Digimon with purple markings and spots all over his body as a design as well as some orange hair on the back of his head. Being the opposite of Joe in personality, Gomamon helped him open up and go with the flow during their adventure.
Davis Motomiya (本宮 大輔, Motomiya Daisuke; Daisuke Motomiya)
Voiced by: Reiko Kiuchi
Davis Motomiya appears in Digimon Adventure 02 as the primary protagonist, he is extremely stubborn in personality and the leader of the DigiDestined during their year-long adventure in 2002. To counter Quartzmon, the Old Clock Shop Man summons Davis and the other team leaders during his challenge to the Digimon Hunters involving Volcdramon.
Veemon (ブイモン, Buimon; V-mon)
Veemon is a dragon-themed Digimon who is Davis' partner. Like Davis, Veemon is impulsive in personality. Though he could only Armor Digivolve during the first half of Digimon 02, Veemon is later able to naturally Digivolve into ExVeemon.
Ken Ichijouji (一乗寺 賢, Ichijōji Ken)
Voiced by: Romi Park
Ken Ichijouji is the final member of the Digimon Adventure 02 DigiDestined, partnered with Wormmon and holder of the Crest of Kindness. Unlike the other 02 DigiDestined, he lives in Tamachi which is next to Odaiba. Originally, due to a series of unfortunate events, Ken became the Digimon Emperor and enslaved Digimon with mind-controlling Dark Rings (which worked on In-Training, Rookie, and Champion Level Digimon) and Dark Spirals (which worked on Ultimate Level Digimon and the occasional Champion Level Digimon). It took Davis and Wormmon's sacrifice to make Ken realize the evil he committed upon Kimeramon's destruction.
Wormmon (ワームモン, Waamumon)
Wormmon is a small green caterpillar-themed creature who cares for Ken's well being to point of allowing his human to cause trouble before the events of Kimeramon's creating forced him to sacrifice himself to stop the monster while snapping Ken out of his madness. Wormmon eventually revives and is reunited with Ken.
Takato Matsuki (松田 啓人, Matsuda Takato; Takato Matsuda)
Voiced by: Makoto Tsumura
Takato Matsuki appears in Digimon Tamers as the primary protagonist, a cheerful, happy, carefree person whose loves for Digimon resulted in the creation of his partner Guilmon from a Blue Card he found among his cards. Due to Guilmon being product of his imagination, Takato appears to empathic with his Digimon and thus the two influence each other in their fights, by swiping Digimon Battle Cards to his Digivice giving Guilmon an extra boost for power. Though the two parted ways in the series finale, Takato was last seen witnessing a portal to the Digital World opening up. As the rest of the Tamers battle Quartzmon around the world, Takato aids the Fusion Fighters United Army in Japan.
Guilmon (ギルモン, Girumon)
Guilmon is a therapod dinosaur-themed Digimon who bears the Digital hazard mark on his chest. Guilmon was created by Takato as a drawing and was brought to life soon after by the Blue Card which the DigiGnomes secretly placed among Takato's card deck. Though a rookie, Guilmon originally has a childish mindsight and mentally matured overtime as he gained more experience.
Rika Nonaka (牧野 留姫, Makino Ruki; Ruki Makino)
Voiced by: Fumiko Orikasa
Rika Nonoka is a tomboyish girl from Digimon Tamers who first saw Digimon as nothing more than data, but eventually forged an equal partnership with Renamon. She makes her appearance in this series where she and Mimi Tachikawa meet Nene and Christopher in Hong Kong's DigiQuartz before going to Greece.
Renamon (レナモン, Renamon)
Renamon is a fox-themed Digimon who is very mature in both form and mentality, using a ninja-type fighting state. Though she saw Rika as nothing more but a means to become stronger, Renamon began to care for her partner's well being.
Takuya Kanbara (神原 拓也, Kanbara Takuya)
Voiced by: Junko Takeuchi
Takuya Kanbara appears in "Digimon Frontier" as the primary protagonist. Receiving a mysterious SMS message on his mobile phone one afternoon during his brother's birthday, Takuya arrives to a subway station, where a Trailmon took him to the Digital World where he obtained the Spirits of AncientGreymon and used them to battle the forces of Cherubimon and later Lucemon. Takuya aids the Fusion Fighters United Army in Japan as Aldamon before his team's arrival allows him to become Susanoomon. Takuya is one of the legendary Generals in Digimon Xros Wars: Super Digicard Battle.
Tommy Himi (氷見 友樹, Himi Tomoki; Tomoki Himi)
Voiced by: Kumiko Watanabe
Tommy Himi is the youngest member of the Legendary Warriors, chosen to wield AncientMegatheriumon's power through the Spirits of ice. Originally a shy crybaby, Tommy became a stronger person from his adventure.
Marcus Damon (大門 大, Daimon Masaru; Masaru Daimon)
Voiced by: Soichiro Hoshi
Marcus Damon is the hot headed fourteen-year-old primary protagonist in Digimon Data Squad. He loves to fight and, in his own way, considers himself to be an "ultimate fighter". Throughout his adventure, Marcus learns of his father's connections to both the DATS organization he himself works for and the Digimon which he encounters and learns that some of them have been provoked into invading the human world. Eventually, after restoring peace between the human and Digital Worlds, Marcus decides to stay in the Digital World and help Agumon keep the peace. To counter Quartzmon, the Old Clock Shop Man summons Marcus and the other team leaders during his challenge to the Digimon Hunters involving Volcdramon. He and Agumon reveal themselves to Xros Heart in a collaboration with Tai Kamiya and his Agumon to help Mikey fight off an embodiment of Quartzmon. As the rest of his team battle Quartzmon around the world, Marcus aids the Fusion Fighters United Army in Japan.
Agumon (アグモン, Agumon)
Voiced by: Taiki Matsuno
Different from Tai's Agumon, Marcus's Agumon is larger with bound red leather belts on his arms. Ending up in the real world, Agumon became Marcus's partner, calling him "boss" (兄貴, aniki).
ShineGreymon (シャイングレイモン, ShainGureimon): Agumon's Mega Level, a Light-Dragon Digimon whose armor is made of Red Digizoid and fights with both accumulated solar energy and the GeoGrey Sword. ShineGreymon can assume Burst Mode (バーストモード, Bāsuto Mōdo).

== Release ==
Digimon Xros Wars was first publicly revealed in the June 2010 issue of Shueisha's V Jump magazine, including the name of the series and brief descriptions of the series and several main characters. It was directed by Tetsuya Endo and written by Riku Sanjo. A number of staff and voice actors for the anime were selected from those from Gegege no Kitarō (2007) and Hakaba Kitarō (2008), including Riku Sanjo and Minami Takayama. A third season was decided suddenly, with Yukio Kaizawa as the main writer for the first episode. In order to retain the series' popularity, Mikey Kudo remained as a returning character, while Christopher and Nene were removed from the main cast. Instead, Ewan remained as a protagonist due to his character still needing growth. The series was the first to air in widescreen 16:9 and in HD 1080i, and aired on TV Asahi from July 6, 2010, to March 25, 2012. Crunchyroll began streaming the original Japanese version of the series outside of Japan, with English subtitles in November 2011.

In September 2012, it was announced that Saban Brands had acquired licensing rights to the Digimon brand and secured global rights to localize Digimon Fusion outside Asia, with Marvista Entertainment handling international sales. Saban Brands contracted Studiopolis to dub the series into English and hiring Noam Kaniel to compose the music for the series. In February 2013, Saban Brands pre-sold the series to Nickelodeon in the United States where it began airing on September 7, 2013, before being moved to Nicktoons after three episodes, and later began airing on The CW's Vortexx programming block from January 25 to September 27, 2014. The first season became available for streaming on Netflix starting September 13, 2014, while the second season became available on March 8, 2016.

In the United Kingdom, Saban Brands and Marvista Entertainment pre-sold the series to CITV in October 2013, and secured ITV Studios Global Entertainment as the exclusive UK licensing agent. The series premiered on CITV on February 24, 2014. YTV began airing the series on February 28, 2014. In the Philippines, it began airing on Yey! after the end of Digimon Frontier, but it ended on July 1, 2020 (due to ABS-CBN's franchise renewal controversy).

=== Home media ===
The series was released on DVD with nineteen volumes by Bandai Visual in Japan from April 22, 2011, to August 24, 2012. A DVD box was released on November 22, 2016. Part I was released in the US on February 10, 2015, via Cinedigm; Part II was released on March 1, 2016. In Australia, the first season was released by Roadshow Entertainment on June 11, 2014.

=== Theme songs ===
Kosuke Yamashita composed the music for the series. A total of three CD soundtracks under the label of Music Code were released in Japan on September 29, 2010, March 23, 2011, and January 18, 2012.

Opening theme songs (Japan)

- "Never Give Up!" (ネバギバ!, Neba Giba!) by Sonar Pocket (1-30)
- "New World" by Twill (31–54)
- "STAND UP" by Twill (55–79)

Insert songs (Japan)

- "WE ARE Xros Heart!" (WE ARE クロスハート!, WE ARE Kurosu Hāto!) by Kōji Wada
- "Blazing Blue Flare" by Hideaki Takatori
- "X4B The Guardian!" by Kōji Wada
- "Sora Mau Yūsha! X5" (空舞う勇者!×5, Sora Mau Yūsha! Kurosu Faibu; "Whirl Through the Sky! X5") by Kōji Wada
- "Dark Knight ~Fujimi no Ōja~" (DARK KNIGHT～不死身の王者～; "Dark Knight (The Immortal Ruler)") by Takayoshi Tanimoto
- "Evolution &Digixros ver.TAIKI" by Kōji Wada and Takayoshi Tanimoto
- "Evolution &Digixros ver.KIRIHA" by Kōji Wada and Takayoshi Tanimoto
- "WE ARE Xros Heart! ver. X7" (WE ARE クロスハート! ver. X7, WE ARE Kurosu Hāto! ver. X7) by Kōji Wada, Takayoshi Tanimoto and Ayumi Miyazaki
- "Tagiru Chikara!" (タギルチカラ!; "Overflowing Power!") by Psychic Lover
- "Shining Dreamers" by Takafumi Iwasaki
- "Legend Xros Wars" (レジェンド・クロスウォーズ, Rejendo Kurosu Wōzu) by YOFFY and Takafumi Iwasaki

Theme song (US / International - Outside Asia)

- "Act as One (Digimon Fusion Theme)" by Noam Kaniel (Noam) and Frederic Jaffre (1-54)

== Related media ==
A manga adaptation, illustrated by Yuki Nakashima, was serialized in Shueisha's V Jump magazine from June 21, 2010, to March 21, 2012. Its twenty-one chapters were collected in four tankōbon volumes, released from December 29, 2010, to May 2, 2012.

Two arcade machines, Digimon X Arena (デジモンクロスアリーナ, Dejimon Kurosu Arīna) and Super Digicard Battle (超デジカ大戦, Sūpā Dejika Taisen), have been released, which utilise special cards. A video game based on the series, Digimon Story: Super Xros Wars (デジモンストーリー超クロスウォーズ, Dejimon Sutōrī Sūpā Kurosu Wōzu), was released in Red and Blue versions for the Nintendo DS on March 3, 2011. Together, Super Xros Wars serves as the fourth game in the Digimon Story series. Bandai released a series of card games in North America.

== Reception ==
On its Japanese premiere, Digimon Fusion had a rating of 4.1 viewers. Digimon Xros Wars: The Boy Hunters Who Leapt Through Time was nominated for the 2012 International Emmy Kids Awards for Kids: Animation. Famicom Tsūshin scored Digimon Story: Super Xros Wars 32 out of 40. Early responses by Anime News Network praised the pilot, stating nostalgic Digimon fans would enjoy it based on its new approach to power-ups within the main cast and compared it to the highly acclaimed mecha series Gurren Lagann despite suffering from cliches often seen in other anime. Voice actor Kyle Hebert said he enjoyed working in the English dub of the series as his two characters, Dorulumon and Balistamon, offered diverse characterization. Fellow actor Ben Diskin shared similar feelings, commenting he had been a fan of Fusion ever since its Japanese premiere and thus was glad to be voicing both Shoutmon and Cutemon, another pair of characters whose personalities differ greatly.

General critical reception has also been positive. Mediaverum enjoyed the early episodes from Fusion and recommended it to fans of both the first two Digimon Adventure series. While noting the series was aimed at a young audience, DVDCorner wrote that the series still had deep themes which might attract older viewers despite its flaws. ICv2 recommended the series for a young audience when checking the English DVDs. CulturedVultures left it up to the viewers to watch it or not, also recommending it to an audience that has knowledge of the franchise, while Metro stated it retained the appeal of its predecessors which overshadowed the famous Pokémon back in the 1990s. DVDTalk found mixed feelings when reviewing Fusion. While he lamented the series' focus on Digimons rather than humans, he still praised the show for its animation and recommended it to fans of the series. Capsule Monster commented that despite the apparent attempts of the series to expand marketing, Fusion offers an appealing story, as rather than focusing on friendship, it also contains dark themes rarely seen in children's shows which might attract other audiences.
