= List of Digimon Fusion episodes =

The following is a list of episodes for Digimon Fusion (known in Japan as Digimon Xros Wars), which is the sixth anime television series in Toei Animation's Digimon franchise. The series aired in Japan on TV Asahi between July 6, 2010, and March 21, 2012. The series was licensed in North America by Saban Brands. The series began airing on Nickelodeon on September 7, 2013, and later moved to Nicktoons on October 13, 2013, after the first three episodes. Reruns would begin airing on The CW's Vortexx block on January 25, 2014.

== Series overview ==
Season	Episodes	Originally released		
Season	Episodes	First released	Last released	Network
1	30	July 6, 2010	March 8, 2011	TV Asahi
2	24	April 5, 2011	September 27, 2011	TV Asahi
3	25	October 4, 2011	March 21, 2012	TV Asahi

== Episode list ==
=== Season 1 (2010–11) ===
No.	English Title/Original Japanese title	Directed by	Written by	Original release date	American air date
1	"Mikey Goes to Another World!" ("Taiki, Go to Another World!"); Transliteration: "Taiki, Isekai e Yuku!" (Japanese: タイキ、異世界へ行く！)	Tetsuya Endō	Riku Sanjō	July 6, 2010	September 7, 2013
2	"He is Shoutmon, Hear Him Roar!" ("Shoutmon, Roar!"); Transliteration: "Shautomon, Hoeru!" (Japanese: シャウ卜モン、吠える！)	Yukio Kaizawa	Riku Sanjō	July 13, 2010	September 14, 2013
3	"A Rival Appears" ("Rival Kiriha, Appear!"); Transliteration: "Raibaru Kiriha, Arawaru!" (Japanese: 強敵キリハ、現る！)	Hiroyuki Kakudō	Riku Sanjō	July 20, 2010	October 5, 2013
4	"Island Zone in Chaos!" ("Island Zone, Upheaval!"); Transliteration: "Airando Zōn, Gekidō!" (Japanese: アイランドゾーン、激動！)	Masahiro Hosoda	Reiko Yoshida	July 27, 2010	October 13, 2013
5	"Thanks for the DigiCards!" ("Digimemory, Shine!"); Transliteration: "Dejimemori, Kagayaku!" (Japanese: デジメモリ、輝く！)	Hiroki Shibata	Reiko Yoshida	August 3, 2010	October 20, 2013
6	"Crisis or Conquest" ("X4, Crisis Breakthrough!"); Transliteration: "Kurosu Fō, Kiki Toppa!" (Japanese: ×4, 危機突破！)	Toshiaki Komura	Reiko Yoshida	August 10, 2010	October 27, 2013
7	"Danger Erupts!" ("Volcano Digimon, Explosion!"); Transliteration: "Kazan Dejimon, Daibakuhatsu!" (Japanese: 火山デジモン、大爆発！)	Yutaka Tsuchida	Shōji Yonemura	August 17, 2010	November 3, 2013
8	"Meltdown in the Magma Zone!" ("Fierce General Tactimon, Close In!"); Transliteration: "Mōshō Takutimon, Semaru!" (Japanese: 猛将タクティモン、迫る！)	Kōhei Kureta	Shōji Yonemura	August 24, 2010	November 5, 2013
9	"Dorulumon's True Colors!" ("Dorulumon, Run Like the Wind!"); Transliteration: "Dorurumon, Kaze ni Kakeru!" (Japanese: ドルルモン、風に駆ける！)	Hiroyuki Kakudō	Shōji Yonemura	August 31, 2010	November 10, 2013
10	"The Rival Champions!" ("Taiki, Become a Knight!"); Transliteration: "Taiki, Kishi ni Naru!" (Japanese: タイキ、騎士になる！)	Masato Mitsuka	Riku Sanjō	September 14, 2010	November 17, 2013
11	"Ice to See You, Angie!" ("Xros Heart, Burn!"); Transliteration: "Kurosu Hāto, Moeru!" (Japanese: クロスハート、燃える！)	Yukio Kaizawa	Riku Sanjō	September 14, 2010	November 24, 2013
12	"Treasure, Traps and Trouble – Oh My!" ("Sand Zone, A Great Adventure in the Ruins!"); Transliteration: "Sando Zōn, Iseki de Daibōuken!" (Japanese: サンドゾーン、遺跡で大冒険！)	Tetsuya Endō	Shōji Yonemura	October 12, 2010	December 1, 2013
13	"Mikey, Warrior of the Light!" ("Taiki, Warrior of the Goddess!"); Transliteration: "Taiki, Megami no Senshi!" (Japanese: タイキ、女神の戦士！)	Masahiro Hosoda	Mitsumi Ito	October 19, 2010	December 8, 2013
14	"Showdown in the Sand Zone" ("The Warrior Beelzebumon, Dances!"); Transliteration: "Senshi Beruzebumon, Mau!" (Japanese: 戦士ベルゼブモン、舞う！)	Yukio Kaizawa; Masato Mitsuka	Hitoshi Tanaka	October 26, 2010	December 15, 2013
15	"Trouble in Paradise" ("Heaven Zone, The Trap of Paradise!"); Transliteration: "Hebun Zōn, Rakuen no Wana!" (Japanese: ヘブンゾーン、楽園の罠！)	Hiroki Shibata	Reiko Yoshida	November 9, 2010	December 22, 2013
16	"A Dark Cloud Over the Sky Zone" ("The Dark Knight Digimon Arrives!"); Transliteration: "Kurokishi Dejimon, Sanjō!" (Japanese: 黒騎士デジモン、参上！)	Hiroyuki Kakudō	Kenta Ishii	November 16, 2010	February 17, 2014
17	"Clash in the Clouds" ("The Miraculous DigiXros! Shoutmon X5 Flies!"); Transliteration: "Kiseki no Dejikurosu! Shautomon Kurosu Faibu Tobu!" (Japanese: 奇跡のデジクロス！シャウトモン×5飛ぶ！)	Yutaka Tsuchida	Daisuke Kihara	November 23, 2010	February 17, 2014
18	"Welcome to the Jungle Zone!" ("Stingmon, the Great Digimon Forest's Hero"); Transliteration: "Sutingumon, Dejimon Dai Mitsurin no Yūsha" (Japanese: スティングモン、デジモン大密林の勇者)	Yōko Ikeda	Riku Sanjō	November 30, 2010	February 23, 2014
19	"Rumble in the Jungle Zone!" ("The Legendary Deckerdramon, Moves!"); Transliteration: "Densetsu no Dekkādoramon, Ugoku!" (Japanese: 伝説のデッカードラモン、動く！)	Masato Mitsuka	Riku Sanjō	December 7, 2010	March 2, 2014
20	"Train of Terror!" ("Dust Zone, Grand Locomon's Big Scrap City!"); Transliteration: "Dasuto Zōn, Gurandorocomon no Dai Sukurappu Toshi!" (Japanese: ダストゾーン、グランドロコモンの大スクラップ都市！)	Yukio Kaizawa	Shouji Yonemura	December 14, 2010	March 9, 2014
21	"Disaster in the Dust Zone!" ("Decisive Battle! DarkKnightmon VS Xros Heart!"); Transliteration: "Kessen! Dākunaitomon VS Kurosu Hāto!" (Japanese: 決戦！ダークナイトモンVSクロスハート！)	Hiroyuki Kakudō	Shouji Yonemura	December 21, 2010	March 16, 2014
22	"Lost in Digital Space" ("Wisemon, the Secrets of the Digital World!"); Transliteration: "Waizumon, Dejitaru Wārudo no Himitsu!" (Japanese: ワイズモン、デジタルワールドの秘密！)	Toshiaki Komura	Riku Sanjō	January 11, 2011	March 23, 2014
23	"Laughing All the Way to the Code Crown" ("Shinobi Zone, The Comical Ninja Battle!"); Transliteration: "Shinobi Zōn, Owarai Ninja Batoru!" (Japanese: シノビゾーン、お笑い忍者バトル！)	Masahiro Hosoda	Reiko Yoshida	January 18, 2011	March 30, 2014
24	"Monitamission Impossible!" ("Dropout Monitamons, Do Your Best!); Transliteration: "Ochikobore Monitamonzu, Ganbaru!" (Japanese: 落ちこぼれモニタモンズ、がんばる！)	Hiroki Shibata	Reiko Yoshida	January 25, 2011	April 6, 2014
25	"Showdown in Shaky Town!" ("Zone Collapses! Sparks Fly Between Taiki and Kiriha!"); Transliteration: "Zōn Hōkai! Hibana Chiru Taiki to Kiriha!" (Japanese: ゾーン崩壊！火花散るタイキとキリハ！)	Yutaka Tsuchida	Riku Sanjō	February 1, 2011	June 1, 2014
26	"Shoutmon – Bogus King or the Real Thing?" ("Shoutmon, Proof of a King!"); Transliteration: "Shautomon, Kingu no Akashi!" (Japanese: シャウトモン、キングの証！)	Hiroyuki Kakudō	Riku Sanjō	February 8, 2011	June 1, 2014
27	"Sweet Zone Bake-Off!" ("Sweets Zone, Sweet Tooth Digimon Battle"); Transliteration: "Suītsu Zōn, Amatō Dejimon Batoru" (Japanese: スイーツゾーン, 甘党デジモンバトル)	Masato Mitsuka	Shouji Yonemura	February 15, 2011	June 8, 2014
28	"Battle in the Digital Depths" ("The Ultimate Weapon Active! Hang in there Cutemon!"); Transliteration: "Saishū Heiki Hatsudō! Ganbare Kyūtomon!" (Japanese: 最終兵器発動！がんばれキュートモン！)	Yukio Kaizawa	Shouji Yonemura	February 22, 2011	June 8, 2014
29	"Fall of the Final Code Crown" ("Taiki & Kiriha VS the Bagra Army, a Complete Showdown!"); Transliteration: "Taiki Kiriha VS Bagura Gun, Zenmen Kessen!" (Japanese: タイキ・キリハVSバグラ軍、全面決戦！)	Masahiro Hosoda	Riku Sanjō	March 1, 2011	June 15, 2014
30	"When Worlds Collide" ("Brand New Journey!! Tokyo Showdown!!"); Transliteration: "Arata Naru Tabidachi!! Tōkyō Daikessen!" (Japanese: 新たなる旅立ち！！東京大決戦！！)	Masato Mitsuka	Riku Sanjō	March 8, 2011	June 15, 2014

=== Season 2 (2011) ===
No. overall	No. in season	English Title/Original Japanese title	Directed by	Written by	Original release date	American air date
31	1	"Back to the Digital World! Hot Time in Dragonland!" ("Towards a New World! The Blazing General of Dragon Land"); Transliteration: "Arata Naru Sekai e! Karetsu Shōgun no Doragon Rando" (Japanese: 新たなる世界へ！火烈将軍のドラゴンランド)	Tetsuya Endo	Riku Sanjo	April 5, 2011	March 8, 2015
32	2	"Take a Stand, Christopher! Fusion Fighters' Rescue Mission!" ("Stand Up, Kiriha! Xros Heart's Rescue Strategy"); Transliteration: "Tachiagare Kiriha! Kurosu Hāto Dakkai Sakusen" (Japanese: 立ち上がれキリハ！クロスハート奪回作戰)	Tetsuya Endo	Riku Sanjo	April 12, 2011	March 8, 2015
33	3	"Vampire Land and the Moonlight General" ("Feel a Chill Run Down your Spine! The Moonlight General's Vampire Land"); Transliteration: "Sesuji Zowazowa! Gekkō Shōgun no Vanpaia Rando" (Japanese: 背筋ゾワゾワ！月光将軍のヴァンパイアランド)	Tetsuya Endo	Shouji Yonemura	April 19, 2011	March 15, 2015
34	4	"Hang on, Greymon! The Rise of Shoutmon DX" ("Don't Die Greymon! Shoutmon DX is Born"); Transliteration: "Shinu na Gureimon! Shautomon Dī Kurosu Tanjō" (Japanese: 死ぬなグレイモン！シャウトモンDX誕生)	Tetsuya Endo	Shouji Yonemura	April 26, 2011	March 15, 2015
35	5	"The Power Drain: The Hunters of Honeyland" ("The Power is Absorbed! The Hunters of Honey Land"); Transliteration: "Pawā ga Suwareru! Hanī Rando no Kariudo-tachi" (Japanese: パワーが吸われる！ハニーランドの狩人たち)	Tetsuya Endo	Reiko Yoshida	May 3, 2011	March 22, 2015
36	6	"Sweet Revenge! The Horrors of Honeyland!" ("The Laughing Hunter! General Zamielmon the Wood-Spirit"); Transliteration: "Warau Kariudo! Mokusei Shougun Zamiērumon" (Japanese: 笑う狩人！木精将軍ザミエールモン)	Tetsuya Endo	Reiko Yoshida	May 10, 2011	March 22, 2015
37	7	"Ewan and the Land of Illusion" ("Brother, Why!? The Nightmarish Enemy, General Yuu"); Transliteration: "Otōto yo, Naze!? Teki Jeneraru Yuu no Akumu" (Japanese: 弟よ、なぜ！？ 敵ジェネラル・ユウの悪夢)	Tetsuya Endo	Riku Sanjo	May 17, 2011	March 29, 2015
38	8	"Psyche-Out in Cyberland!" ("The Mysterious Cyber Land! The Beauty of Fullmetal City"); Transliteration: "Nazo no Saibā Rando! Hagane no Machi no Bishōjo" (Japanese: 謎のサイバーランド！鋼の街の美少女)	Tetsuya Endo	Shoji Yonemura	May 24, 2011	March 29, 2015
39	9	"The Water Tiger's Slippery Trap!" ("Xros Heart Break up Crisis! Water Tiger General's Despicable Trap"); Transliteration: "Kurosu Hāto Bunretsu no Kiki! Suiko Shōgun no Hiretsuna Wana" (Japanese: クロスハート分裂の危機！水虎将軍の卑劣なワナ)	Tetsuya Endo	Shoji Yonemura	May 31, 2011	April 5, 2015
40	10	"Gold Land and the Irate Pirate!" ("Cheerful Pirates Appear! Set Sail for Gold Land!!"); Transliteration: "Yōki na Kaizoku, Arawaru! Gōrudo Rando no Kōkai!!" (Japanese: 陽気な海賊、現る！ゴールドランドの航海！！)	Tetsuya Endo	Riku Sanjo	June 7, 2011	April 5, 2015
41	11	"Ballistamon's Bad News Blast From the Past!" ("Olegmon the Gold Thief Laughs! Farewell Xros Heart!"); Transliteration: "Kinzoku no Orēgumon ga Warau! Saraba Kurosu Hāto!" (Japanese: 金賊のオレーグモンが笑う！ さらばクロスハート！)	Tetsuya Endo	Riku Sanjo	June 14, 2011	April 5, 2015
42	12	"Deep Trouble in Canyon Land!" ("Whispering to Kiriha! Earth-god General of the Canyon, The Devil's Invitation!"); Transliteration: "Kiriha ni Sasayaku! Kyōkoku no Doshin Shōgun, Akuma no Yūi!" (Japanese: キリハにささやく！峡谷の土神将軍、魔の誘い！)	Tetsuya Endo	Shouji Yonemura	June 21, 2011	July 5, 2015
43	13	"Great Fusion! The Power of Friendship" ("The Mighty Love! Deckerdramon's Final Scream!!"); Transliteration: "Tsuyoki Ai o! Dekkādoramon Saigo no Sakebi!!" (Japanese: 強き愛を！デッカードラモン最期の叫び！！)	Tetsuya Endo	Shouji Yonemura	July 4, 2011	July 5, 2015
44	14	"Regeneration Frustration!" ("The Bond of X7! The Sublime Battle with Gravimon!!"); Transliteration: "Kizuna no Kurosu Sebun! Gurabimon no Sōzetsu Batoru!!" (Japanese: きずなの×7！グラビモンとの壮絶バトル！！)	Tetsuya Endo	Reiko Yoshida	July 11, 2011	July 12, 2015
45	15	"Dark Side of the Sun" ("The Final Kingdom, the Shining Sun of Bright Land!"); Transliteration: "Saigo no Ōkoku, Kagayaku Taiyō no Buraito Rando!" (Japanese: 最後の王園、輝く太陽のブライトランド！)	Tetsuya Endo	Riku Sanjo	July 18, 2011	July 12, 2015
46	16	"The Dark Side of Bright Land" ("Dead or Alive, the Hellish General's Decisive Battle!"); Transliteration: "Shō ka Shi ka, Jigoku no Jeneraru Kessen!" (Japanese: 生か死か、地獄のジェネラル決戦！)	Tetsuya Endo	Riku Sanjo	July 25, 2011	July 19, 2015
47	17	"The Battle of the Young Generals" ("Taiki VS. Yuu! Showdown of the Boy Generals!!"); Transliteration: "Taiki vs Yuu! Shōnen Jeneraru Taiketsu!!" (Japanese: タイキvsユウ、少年ジェネラル対決！！)	Tetsuya Endo	Riku Sanjo	August 9, 2011	July 19, 2015
48	18	"Beelzemon's Revenge" ("Beelzebumon, Fade into Light!"); Transliteration: "Beruzebumon, Hikari ni Kiyu!" (Japanese: ベルゼブモン、光に消ゆ！)	Tetsuya Endo	Riku Sanjo	August 16, 2011	July 26, 2015
49	19	"The Darkest Dark General of All!" ("Taiki's Decision! Surpass the Strongest Apollomon!"); Transliteration: "Taiki no Keddan! Saikyō no Aporomon o Koeru!" (Japanese: タイキの決断！最強のアポロモンを超えろ！)	Tetsuya Endo	Riku Sanjo	August 23, 2011	July 26, 2015
50	20	"Prison Land" ("Resurrect! The Appearance of all Seven Death Generals!"); Transliteration: "Yomigaeru! Shichinin no Desu Jeneraru Sōtōjō!!" (Japanese: よみがえる！七人のデスジェネラル総登場！！)	Tetsuya Endo	Shouji Yonemura	August 30, 2011	August 2, 2015
51	21	"Rotten To The Digi-Core!" ("For the Future of the Digital World! The Friendship with the Death Generals!"); Transliteration: "Dejitaru Wārudo no Mirai no Tame ni! Desu Jeneraru to no Yūjō!" (Japanese: デジタルワールドの未来のために！デスジェネラルとの友情！)	Tetsuya Endo	Shouji Yonemura	September 6, 2011	August 2, 2015
52	22	"D5 and the Brotherhood of Evil" ("Bagra Brothers! The Bond of Evil"); Transliteration: "Bagura Kyōdai! Ankoku no Kizuna" (Japanese: バグラ兄弟、暗黒の絆)	Tetsuya Endo	Riku Sanjo	September 13, 2011	August 9, 2015
53	23	"The Darkness Before the Dawn" ("It Approaches! The Human World's Doomsday, D5"); Transliteration: "Semarikuru! Ningenkai no Saigo no Hi, Dī Faibu!!" (Japanese: 迫りくる！人間界の最期の日、D5！！)	Tetsuya Endo	Riku Sanjo	September 20, 2011	August 9, 2015
54	24	"Final Fusion – The Fight for Earth!" ("Grab the DigiXros of Glory! Our Future!"); Transliteration: "Eikō no DejiKurosu, Tsukame! Oretachi no Mirai!!" (Japanese: 栄光のデジクロス、つかめ！おれたちの未来！！)	Tetsuya Endo	Riku Sanjo	September 27, 2011	August 16, 2015

=== Season 3 (2011–12) ===
No. overall	No. in season	Title	Directed by	Written by	Original release date
55	1	("We, the Digimon Hunters!"); Transliteration: "Oretachi, Dejimon Hantā!" (Japanese: おれたち、デジモンハンター!)	Unknown	Riku Sanjo	October 4, 2011
56	2	("The Students Disappear! The Wavering Shadow of Sagomon"); Transliteration: "Seito-tachi ga Kieta! Yurameku Sagomon no Kage" (Japanese: 生徒たちが消えた！ゆらめくサゴモンの影)	Unknown	Riku Sanjo	October 11, 2011
57	3	("The Robot Club's Dream, Pinocchimon's Enticement"); Transliteration: "Robotto Bu no Yume, Pinokimon no Yūwaku" (Japanese: ロボット部の夢、ピノッキモンの誘惑)	Unknown	Shōji Yonemura	October 18, 2011
58	4	("The Targeted Honor Students! Blossomon's Smile"); Transliteration: "Yūtōsei ga Nerawareta! Burossamon no Bishō" (Japanese: 優等生が狙われた！ブロッサモンの微笑)	Unknown	Isao Murayama	October 25, 2011
59	5	("Cuteness Causion! Cute Hunter, Airu's Trap!"); Transliteration: "Kawaii Yōchūi! Kyūto Hantā, Airu no Wana!" (Japanese: かわいさ要注意！キュートハンター、アイルの罠！)	Unknown	Riku Sanjo	November 1, 2011
60	6	("Digimon Kendo Match! Approaching the Blade of Kotemon!"); Transliteration: "Dejimon Kendō Shōbu! Kotemon no Yaiba ga Semaru!" (Japanese: デジモン剣道勝負！コテモンの刃が迫る！)	Unknown	Shōji Yonemura	November 8, 2011
61	7	("The Okonomiyaki Panic! The Town Full of Pagumon"); Transliteration: "Okonomiyaki Panikku! Pagumon Darake no Machi" (Japanese: お好み焼きパニック！パグモンだらけの街)	Unknown	Reiko Yoshida	November 15, 2011
62	8	("Business is Booming For The Digimon Hunt! The Shopping District's Master Hunter!"); Transliteration: "Degimon Hanto Daihanjō! Shōtengai no Sugoude Hantā!" (Japanese: デジモンハント大繁盛！商店街の凄腕ハンター！)	Unknown	Isao Murayama	November 22, 2011
63	9	("Taiki Is Targeted! The Super Celebrity Star's Brave Shout!"); Transliteration: "Nerawareta Taiki! Chō Serebu Sutā no Otakebi!" (Japanese: 狙われたタイキ！超セレブ・スターの雄たけび！)	Unknown	Riku Sanjo	November 29, 2011
64	10	("Going to Hong Kong! Protect the Super Beauty Idol!!"); Transliteration: "Honkon Jōriku! Chōbishōjo Aidoru o Mamore!!" (Japanese: 香港上陸！超美少女アイドルを守れ！！)	Unknown	Shōji Yonemura	December 6, 2011
65	11	("Tagiru Turns Soft?! Gumdramon's Big Crisis!!"); Transliteration: "Tagiru ga Funyafunya!? Gamudoramon Dai Pinchi!!" (Japanese: タギルがふにゃふにゃ!? ガムドラモン大ピンチ!!)	Unknown	Isao Murayama	December 13, 2011
66	12	("Delicious or Nasty? The Digimon Ramen Contest!"); Transliteration: "Oishii? Mazui? Dejimon Rāmen Shōbu!" (Japanese: おいしい？まずい？デジモン・ラーメン勝負！)	Unknown	Shōji Yonemura	December 20, 2011
67	13	("The World Trip for Children only! The Digimon Train of Dreams"); Transliteration: "Kodomo dake no Sekai Ryokō! Yume no Dejimon Torein" (Japanese: 子供だけの世界旅行！夢のデジモントレイン)	Unknown	Reiko Yoshida	December 27, 2011
68	14	("Gather Hunters! Digimon Competition in the Southern Island!"); Transliteration: "Hantā Daishūgō! Minami no Shima no Dejimon Sōdatsusen!" (Japanese: ハンター大集合！南の島のデジモン争奪戦！)	Unknown	Riku Sanjo	January 3, 2012
69	15	("Want Friends? Phelesmon, the Devil's Promise"); Transliteration: "Tomodachi Hoshii? Feresumon, Akuma no Yakusoku" (Japanese: 友達欲しい？フェレスモン悪魔の約束)	Unknown	Auichi Mio	January 10, 2012
70	16	("Heart Racing Fear Experience! The Spirit Hunter Bellows!!"); Transliteration: "Dokidoki Kyōfu Taiken! Shinrei Hantā ga Hoeru!!" (Japanese: ドキドキ恐怖体験！心霊ハンターが吠える！！)	Unknown	Shōji Yonemura	January 17, 2012
71	17	("Resemblance or None at All? The Disguised Phantom Thief Betsumon"); Transliteration: "Niteru? Nitenai? Hensō Kaitō Betsumon" (Japanese: 似てる？似てない？変装怪盗ベツモン)	Unknown	Riku Sanjo	January 24, 2012
72	18	("UFO & Dinosaur Great Gathering! Ekakimon of Dreams"); Transliteration: "Yūfō Kyōryū Daishūgō! Yume no Ekakimon" (Japanese: UFO・恐竜大集合！夢のエカキモン)	Unknown	Isao Murayama	January 31, 2012
73	19	("The Great Undersea Adventure! Find the Digimon Treasure of Dreams!"); Transliteration: "Kaitei Daibōken! Yume no Zaihō Dejimon o Sagase!" (Japanese: 海底大冒険！夢の財宝デジモンを探せ！)	Unknown	Shōji Yonemura	February 7, 2012
74	20	("Rare Card Vanished! The Invincible RookChessmon"); Transliteration: "Rea Kādo ga Kieta! Muteki no Rūkuchesumon" (Japanese: レアカードが消えた！無敵のルークチェスモン)	Unknown	Reiko Yoshida	February 14, 2012
75	21	("The Amusement Park of Dreams, Digimon Land!"); Transliteration: "Yume no Yūenchi, Dejimon Rando!" (Japanese: 夢の遊園地、デジモンランド！)	Unknown	Aiuchi Mio	February 21, 2012
76	22	("The Golden Insect! The Mysterious MetallifeKuwagamon"); Transliteration: "Ōgon Konchū! Metarifekuwagāmon no Nazo" (Japanese: 黄金昆虫！メタリフェクワガーモンの謎)	Unknown	Riku Sanjo	February 28, 2012
77	23	("Now Revealed! The Secret of the Digimon Hunt"); Transliteration: "Ima Akasareru! Dejimon Hanto no Himitsu" (Japanese: 今明かされる！デジモンハントの秘密)	Unknown	Riku Sanjo	March 7, 2012
78	24	("Grand Gathering of the Legendary Heroes! The Play-offs of the Digimon All Stars!!"); Transliteration: "Densetsu no Hīrō Daishūketsu! Dejimon Ōru Sutā Kessen!!" (Japanese: 伝説のヒーロー大集結！デジモンオールスター決戦!!)	Unknown	Riku Sanjo	March 14, 2012
79	25	("Now Burn Up Tagiru! The Glorious Digimon Hunt!"); Transliteration: "Moeagare Tagiru! Eikō no Dejimon Hanto!" (Japanese: 燃え上がれタギル！栄光のデジモンハント！)	Unknown	Riku Sanjo	March 21, 2012
