= Love Pop =

- Digital and CD-only edition cover

Studio album by Ai Otsuka
- Released: December 8, 2021
- Recorded: 2018–2021
- Genre: J-pop
- Label: Avex Trax

Ai Otsuka chronology
Ai Inutsuka One on One Collaboration (2021)	Love Pop (2021)	Marble (2023)

Singles from Love Pop
- 1. "Dracaena" Released: September 5, 2018; 2. "Chime" Released: September 4, 2019; 3. "Aibiki" Released: May 12, 2021 (digital); 4. "Nandakke" Released: June 30, 2021 (digital); 5. "Go" Released: September 9, 2021 (digital); 6. "Santa ni Kiss wo Shite" Released: November 17, 2021 (digital)

Love Pop (stylized in all caps) is the ninth studio album by Japanese singer-songwriter Ai Otsuka. It was released on December 8, 2021, through Avex Trax.

== Background ==
After the release of her eighth studio album, Love Honey, Otsuka did not release new material throughout 2017. In February 2018, she released an EP entitled Aio Piano, in which she self-covered some of previous songs with just piano and vocals. This was followed by the sequel to her first greatest hits album Ai am Best, entitled Ai Am Best, Too, released in January 2019. During 2018 and 2019, she also released two physical singles, "Dracaena" and "Chime", which were used as theme songs in the TV anime series Pikachin Kit and Fruits Basket, respectively. After the release of "Chime", Otsuka began collaborating with different electronic musicians and released a series of new remixes on digital platforms throughout 2020, which were ultimately included on her first remix album, Ai Inutsuka One on One Collaboration, released in February 2021. In April 2021, Otsuka began releasing new music again and exclusively on digital platforms, starting with "Aibiki", a collaborative single with Akko Gorilla, followed by "Nandakke", her first original solo song in two years. This was followed by the release of another new song, "Go", on September 9, 2021, the day of Otsuka's 39th birthday. The release of the then-untitled album was first announced on Otsuka's official website a week prior to the release of "Go", on September 1, 2021, while its title was announced on October 5, 2021.

Love Pop became Otsuka's first studio album in approximately four and a half years since Love Honey. It was preceded by the singles "Dracaena" and "Chime" (the only two songs that were previously released on physical formats), as well as the songs “Aibiki” with Akko Gorilla, “Nandakke”, “Go”, "Santa wo Kiss wo Shite", and "Koifull", which were previously released on digital platforms.

This album was conceived around the theme of “excitement” (tokimeki) and, regarding its title, Otsuka commented that it reflected on her acceptance of the Pop label that’s often attached to her persona. She explained that, in the early days of her career, she had a strong resistance to external perceptions of her as “cute” or “pop.” and rebelled against such labels. However, Otsuka declared that upon hearing Yoshiki Mizuno (from Ikimonogakari) state: “No matter what others think, I love Pop music and I will keep doing it,” she felt deeply moved and shifted her perception about the Pop concept. Gradually, she declared that she came to think, “So what if I am Pop?” and began wanting to say it with confidence. As she experienced childbirth and grew older, her mindset also changed, stating “I realized I no longer needed to act edgy, and I began to think - Everything I have done and my existence itself is nothing but Pop".

The album was released in four different formats: CD+2DVD, CD+Blu-ray, CD only, and a CD+Goods edition (limited to fan club members). The DVD and Blu-ray editions include footage of all the songs performed at Otsuka's birthday live show Love is Born 18th Anniversary 2021, held on September 9, 2021, at Line Cube Shibuya in Tokyo, as well as the six music videos filmed for this record.

The album cover features elements like a reversed title, and two versions of Otsuka appearing as reflecting images. By flipping the logo of the title, the word Pop can also be read as 909, which is a nod to Otsuka's birthday, September 9.

== Track listing ==
All tracks are written by Aio, except where noted.

Love Pop - CD, digital release
No.	Title	Writer(s)	Arranger(s)	Length
1.	"Chime"		Aio; Hiroo; Gen Ittetsu (strings)	5:33
2.	"Santa ni Kiss wo Shite" (サンタにkissをして)		Aio; Hiroo; Mio (strings)	4:13
3.	"Koifull" (恋フル)		Aio; Cap	3:19
4.	"Hoshizora Record" (星空レコード)		Aio; Cap	3:58
5.	"Nureru Hana" (濡れる花)		Aio; Mio (strings)	4:03
6.	"Mr. Lover"		Aio; Hiroo	3:41
7.	"Aibiki" (あいびき) (with Akko Gorilla)	Aio; Akko Gorilla	HirasawondeR	3:27
8.	"Demeneko Paradise" (デメネコパラダイス)	Aio; Chūya Koyama	Aio; Hiroo	1:56
9.	"Nandakke" (なんだっけ)		Aio; Hiroo	3:29
10.	"Dracaena" (ドラセナ)		Aio; Hiroo; Mio (strings)	5:42
11.	"Go"		Aio; Hiroo	3:21
Total length:				42:42

BD/DVD: Love Is Born: 18th Anniversary 2021 + Music Videos
No.	Title	Length
1.	"Nandakke"	3:30
2.	"QueeN"	4:10
3.	"More More"	3:51
4.	"Kingyo Hanabi" (Animal Hack Remix)	5:08
5.	"Kuroge Wagyu Joshio Tanyaki 680-en" (with Harami-chan)	5:25
6.	"Planetarium" (with Harami-chan)	6:48
7.	"Momo no Hanabira"	5:54
8.	"High Navi" (with Akko Gorilla)	3:10
9.	"Matatabi" (with Akko Gorilla)	3:29
10.	"Aibiki" (with Akko Gorilla)	4:02
11.	"Hey! Bear"	5:09
12.	"End and And ~10,000 Hearts~"	5:15
13.	"Nureru Hana"	4:25
14.	"Amaenbo"	3:48
15.	"RounD" (with Shiori Tomita)	5:00
16.	"Dame Dame da" (with Shiori Tomita)	3:25
17.	"Rocket Sneaker"	4:17
18.	"Chu-Lip"	3:46
19.	"Frienger"	3:47
20.	"Sakuranbo"	4:39
21.	"Go"	3:35
22.	"Dracaena" (Music Video)	5:41
23.	"Chime" (Music Video)	4:12
24.	"Aibiki" (Music Video)	3:27
25.	"Nandakke" (Music Video)	3:29
26.	"Go" (Music Video)	3:21
27.	"Santa ni Kiss wo Shite" (Music Video)	4:13
Total length:		116:56

== Charts ==
Weekly chart performance for Love Pop
Chart (2021)	Peak position
Japanese Albums (Oricon)	31
Japanese Top Albums Sales (Billboard Japan)	25
