= Nandakke =

Single by Ai Otsuka

from the album Love Pop
- Language: Japanese
- Released: June 30, 2021
- Genre: J-pop
- Length: 3:27
- Label: Avex Trax
- Songwriter: Aio

Ai Otsuka singles chronology
| "Aibiki" (2021) | "Nandakke" (2021) | "Go" (2021) |

Music video
- "Nandakke" on YouTube

"Nandakke" (なんだっけ, lit. 'What was that again?') is a song by Japanese singer-songwriter Ai Otsuka. The song was released as a digital single on June 30, 2021, through Avex Trax.

It marked her first new release under her own name since the 2019 single "Chime", nearly two years prior.

== Background ==
"Nandakke" is a reflective pop song that explores themes of uncertainty in daily life and the human search for meaning, encapsulated in the repeated question-like phrase “nandakke” (Japanese for "what was it again?"). The song aims to resonate with listeners facing emotional fatigue and mental strain, particularly during the COVID-19 pandemic.

The inspiration for "Nandakke" came from Otsuka’s personal experience caring for a young girl who was struggling with severe emotional and physical exhaustion. During the summer prior to the song's release, Otsuka spent time with this person, who had become withdrawn due to various life challenges, including an inability to attend school or eat properly. Despite engaging in simple, comforting activities and offering emotional support, Otsuka felt that her efforts were not fully reaching this person. Reflecting on this experience, Otsuka channeled her feelings of helplessness and her desire to provide comfort into the creation of "Nandakke." She composed the song with the intention of offering it as a safe emotional space—not only for the girl she had cared for, but also for others experiencing similar feelings of anxiety, disconnection, or uncertainty.

The single's cover art features a prominent question mark, which according to Otsuka symbolizes the song's core theme of ambiguous emotions and unanswered questions.

In a public statement, Otsuka commented:

It’s my first new song in about two years. I hope that a day will come soon when everyone can sing together again. Until then, I hope this song can help you cope with the stress and hardships you're facing.

— Ai Otsuka, Billboard

== Promotion ==
To support the release, a live session video featuring Ai Otsuka performing "Nandakke" alongside keyboardist Emi Nishino was published. This video was made available for a limited time until July 5, 2021.

On July 15, 2021, an animated lyric video for the song premiered on YouTube at 8:00 PM JST. The animation was created by Japanese illustrator Nanaki Pantz. The video combines expressive imagery with the song’s lyrics to portray everyday emotions such as frustration, anxiety, and restlessness. Otsuka also participated in the YouTube live chat during the premiere, interacting directly with fans.

Ahead of its official release, the lyrics for "Nandakke" were made available on Uta-Net, a popular Japanese lyric database, on June 25, 2021, where it quickly rose to the top of the site's real-time ranking chart.

== Track listing ==
Nandakke - Digital release
| No. | Title | Writer(s) | Length |
|---|---|---|---|
| 1. | "Nandakke" | Aio | 3:27 |
