= Dame Dame da =

2014 single by Shiori Tomita

- Standard edition cover

Single by Shiori Tomita

from the album Moshimo World
- Language: Japanese
- Released: December 10, 2014
- Genre: J-pop; pop rock
- Length: 3:57
- Label: Epic Records Japan
- Songwriter: Aio
- Producer: Aio

Shiori Tomita singles chronology
"Happy and Happy" (2014)	"Dame Dame da" (2014)	"Jūnana-sai no Uta" (2015)

"Dame Dame da" (だめだめだ, lit. 'No Good, No Good') is a song by Japanese singer Shiori Tomita, written by singer-songwriter Ai Otsuka. The song was released as Tomita's fourth single on December 10, 2014, through Epic Records Japan.

== Background and release ==
Similar to her previous single "Happy and Happy", the title track of this single was written and produced by Ai Otsuka, becoming the second time she provides a song for Tomita.

The single was released on two formats: a limited edition and a standard edition, with the limited edition including a bonus DVD with two versions of the song's music video.

The song was subsequently included on Tomita's debut album Moshimo World.

== Composition and themes ==
Upon its release, the song was described as a "cool, negative rock number" that diverged from Tomita's established public image, offering a fresh and edgier sound, and has a fast-paced, energetic feel, defying the seemingly pessimistic tone suggested by its title.

Its title, written in hiragana, is a palindrome in Japanese, which can be read the same forwards and backwards.

== Music video ==
The music video for "Dame Dame da", directed by Masakazu Fukatsu, was shot in a single take and focuses on Tomita's facial expressions as she performs the song.

== Promotion ==
The song served as ending theme for the anime series Naruto: Shippuden, which began airing on TV Tokyo on October 2, 2014. This became the first time that Tomita was appointed to perform a theme song for an anime series.

== Cover versions ==
In 2019, Otsuka recorded two self-cover versions of the song with English and Japanese lyrics. The English version of the song was retitled "XOX" and was included on Otsuka's single "Chime", while the version with Japanese lyrics was included as a bonus track on the single's digital edition.

== Chart performance ==
The song peaked at number 48 on the Oricon Singles chart, where it charted for one week.

== Track listing ==
Dame Dame da - CD single, digital download
No.	Title	Lyrics	Music	Arranger(s)	Length
1.	"Dame Dame da"	Aio	Aio	Aio; Ikoman	3:57
2.	"Meguri Meguru" (めぐりめぐる)	Shiori Tomita	Makoto Wakatabe	Wataru Akizuki	4:51
3.	"Happy and Happy" (TeddyLoid Happy Lucky Remix)	Aio	Aio	TeddyLoid	4:12
4.	"Dame Dame da" (Naruto ver.)				1:32
5.	"Dame Dame da" (Instrumental)				3:57
Total length:					18:29

Dame Dame da - Limited edition DVD
No.	Title	Length
1.	"Dame Dame da" (Music Video)
2.	"Dame Dame da" (Music Video - Director's Cut)
3.	"Dame Dame da" (Making of)
