= Aibiki =

Single by Ai Otsuka & Akko Gorilla

from the album Love Pop
- Language: Japanese
- Released: May 12, 2021
- Genre: J-pop
- Length: 3:25
- Label: Avex Trax
- Songwriter: Aio

Ai Otsuka singles chronology
"Chime" (2019)	"Aibiki" (2021)	"Nandakke" (2021)

Ako Gorilla singles chronology
"Don't Push Me" (2021)	"Aibiki" (2021)	"I'm Here" (2021)

Music video
- "Aibiki" on YouTube

"Aibiki" (あいびき, lit. 'Rendezvous' or 'Minced Meat') is a song by Japanese singer-songwriter Ai Otsuka and rapper Akko Gorilla. The song was released as the lead track of their first collaborative digital single on May 12, 2021, through Avex Trax.

== Background ==
The collaboration between Otsuka and Akko Gorilla originated from their meeting at the online music festival Live Human in June 2020. Akko Gorilla, who served as host for a live-streamed program covering the festival’s behind-the-scenes content, connected with Otsuka, who appeared as a guest after her performance. Their instant rapport led to discussions about a potential musical collaboration, culminating in the creation of three distinct tracks.

The project was revealed to the public during Otsuka’s Instagram Live held on April 23, 2021, when Akko Gorilla unexpectedly joined the stream to announce the release of "Aibiki" and the forthcoming digital single. The collaboration was described as a “mixed martial arts match” of musical styles, highlighting the unique chemistry between Otsuka’s melodic pop and Akko Gorilla’s energetic rap.

On the collaborative experience, Otsuka expressed profound admiration for Akko Gorilla’s vocal presence, describing her voice as possessing a “unique blend of immense strength and poignancy” that she found unparalleled. Reflecting on their collaboration across the three tracks, Otsuka admitted to feeling outmatched by Akko Gorilla’s talent, stating that she could not surpass her in any aspect of the work. However, she viewed this as a positive aspect of their partnership, noting that working together was rewarding and allowed her to confidently present the songs to listeners. On the other hand, kko Gorilla expressed disbelief and excitement at the opportunity to collaborate with Otsuka, whom she had long admired and sung at karaoke. She described the experience as surreal, questioning “what kind of world line” allowed her to work with such an iconic artist. Akko Gorilla was particularly impressed by Otsuka’s ability to transform any idea into something “instantly catchy,” marveling at her songwriting and production skills. She noted that collaborating with Otsuka inspired her to experiment with creating more “space” in her music to enhance its pop appeal, though she humorously admitted to largely sticking to her usual style.

== Composition and themes ==
The digital single comprises three tracks, each with a distinct musical and thematic identity. "Aibiki" uses a double entendre in its title, which can mean both “rendezvous” (逢い引き) and “minced meat” (合い挽き). The song metaphorically likens a romantic relationship to making a hamburger, exploring the challenges and beauty of two people trying to connect despite differences. Otsuka described it as a song about the “wonderful ‘I love you’” that emerges when two people deeply understand each other, resulting in the “strongest hamburger.” Secondly, "High Navi" aims to empower women to overcome daily societal pressures and embrace self-affirmation. Otsuka commented on the song: "We created this song with Akko-chan to help many women release the unavoidable constraints they face daily. It was crafted with the idea of how far one can navigate with high energy in the personal space of their own home and how much they can affirm themselves." Lastly, "Matatabi" was inspired by the theme of “a cat playing with catnip,”. This track is a relaxed, sweet, and dreamy song that explores the tension between rationality and emotional surrender. Otsuka described it as expressing tender feelings of love and the bittersweet pleasure of letting go. The song’s mellow tone contrasts with the high energy of “High Navi,” showcasing the versatility of the collaboration.

== Music video ==
The music video, was published on YouTube on May 7, 2021. The video was directed by Mani Kato, and filmed at an actual location of the family restaurant chain Big Boy, featuring Otsuka and Akko Gorilla humorously preparing and eating hamburgers in a stylish yet comedic setting.

An animated lyric video of "High Navi" was published on May 14, 2021. It was designed by illustrator Give Me! Tomotaka (ギブミ～！トモタカ) and depicts cartoon versions of Otsuka and Akko Gorilla reveling in a lively, pop-art-inspired setting.

== Track listing ==
All tracks are written by Aio & Akko Gorilla.

Aibiki - Digital release
No.	Title	Length
1.	"Aibiki" (あいびき)	3:25
2.	"High Navi" (ハイナビ; Hainabi)	3:07
3.	"Matatabi" (またたび)	3:28
