= Go (Ai Otsuka song) =

Single by Ai Otsuka

from the album Love Pop
- Language: Japanese
- Released: September 9, 2021
- Genre: J-pop
- Length: 3:20
- Label: Avex Trax
- Songwriter: Aio

Ai Otsuka singles chronology
"Nandakke" (2021)	"Go" (2021)	"Santa ni Kiss wo Shite" (2021)

Music video
- "Go" on YouTube

"Go" is a song by Japanese singer-songwriter Ai Otsuka. The song was released as a digital single on June 30, 2021, through the Japanese record label Avex Trax.

== Background and release ==
"Go" was written and composed by Ai Otsuka, marking her return to music creation after a two-year period of writer's block. In a statement, Otsuka shared that the song was inspired by her gradual recovery from a time when she felt emotionally and creatively lost. She described "Go" as a pivotal work that "brought [her] back to creating," expressing hope that it would serve as a "tailwind" for listeners. The track was released just two months after her previous single, "Nandakke," showcasing a rapid creative output. "Go" is described as an upbeat, guitar-pop number with a strong, positive energy. The song's lyrics and melody reflect Otsuka's signature style of blending emotional depth with catchy, accessible pop elements. Its theme of "restarting" resonates with listeners, drawing from Otsuka's personal experience of rediscovering her creative drive.

The digital single was released through Avex Trax on September 9, 2021, the day of Otsuka's 39th birthday. It was accompanied by a jacket photo taken by Otsuka herself. The artwork features an everyday urban scene bathed in sunlight, evoking a sense of optimism and forward momentum. The song premiered on J-Wave's radio program "Groove Line" on August 30, 2021, ahead of its official release.

== Promotion ==
To celebrate the release of "Go" and her birthday, Otsuka held her annual anniversary and birthday live event, Love is Born: 18th Anniversary 2021, on September 9, 2021, at Line Cube Shibuya (Shibuya Public Hall) in Tokyo. The concert featured performances of "Go" alongside other hits from her career.

Additionally, a fan engagement campaign titled the "Go Another MV Submission Campaign" was launched. Fans were invited to share their favorite photos or videos from Otsuka's 18-year career on Twitter with the hashtag #大塚愛GO. Selected submissions were used to create an alternative music video for "Go," which was later shared on Otsuka's official social media accounts.

On September 16, 2021, Otsuka participated in a special online event hosted by Japanese music streaming service AWA in their "Lounge" platform. The hour-long event featured Otsuka interacting with fans via chat, playing "Go" and other popular songs, and taking song requests, further promoting the single.

== Track listing ==
Go - Digital release
No.	Title	Writer(s)	Length
1.	"Go"	Aio	3:20
