= Chime (Ai Otsuka song) =

- Digital and CD+BD/DVD edition cover

Single by Ai Otsuka

from the album Love Pop
- Language: Japanese
- Released: September 4, 2019
- Genre: J-pop, anime song
- Length: 3:55
- Label: Avex Trax
- Songwriter(s): aio

Ai Otsuka singles chronology
"Dear, You" (2018)	"Chime" (2019)	"Aibiki" (2021)

Music video
- "Chime" on YouTube

"Chime" is a song by Japanese singer-songwriter Ai Otsuka. The song was released as her 26th single on September 4, 2019, through Avex Trax.

== Background ==
"Chime" was used as opening theme for the second half of TV Tokyo anime series Fruits Basket, which began airing July 5, 2019. The song was described as a positive and upbeat track aimed at “ringing a starting bell for those who want to change but find it hard to take that first step.”

Otsuka revealed that she actually had written the song four years prior, but adapted its lyrics to reflect on the anime series. The theme she wanted to convey with the song was that "it’s okay not to be perfect, that’s why people meet and connect with others." Otsuka co-arranged the song with Hiroo Yamaguchi (under pen name "hiroo").

The single’s b-sides include “Kit Palette,” which was previously released on digital platforms and used as the theme song for KitKat's "Everyday Nuts & Cranberry" in Japan, and “XOX,” an English self-cover of the 2014 song “Dame Dame da”, which was originally written by Otsuka for Shiori Tomita, and used as ending theme for TV anime series Naruto: Shippuden. The self-cover of “Dame Dame da” with Japanese lyrics is included on the Chime digital EP.

The single was released in four formats: CD only, CD+DVD, CD+Blu-ray disc, and a Fan Club/mu-mo/Event-limited edition. The accompanying DVD and Blu-ray include footage from Ai Otsuka’s Ai am Best, Too Tour 2019 concert held on May 2, 2019, at Zepp DiverCity, as well as the music video for “Chime.” The Fan Club/mu-mo/Event-limited edition comes as a deluxe box set including an A4-sized photo card collection from the aforementioned tour.

== Chart performance ==
"Chime" peaked at number 35 on the Oricon Weekly Singles chart, and charted for 2 weeks.

== Track listing ==
Chime - CD single
No.	Title	Writer(s)	Length
1.	"Chime"	Aio	3:55
2.	"Kit Palette"	Aio	3:55
3.	"XOX"	Kate Beck, mpl, Aio	3:21
4.	"Chime" (Instrumental)		3:55
5.	"Kit Palette" (Instrumental)		3:55
6.	"XOX" (Instrumental)		3:20
Total length:			22:21

Chime - digital EP
No.	Title	Writer(s)	Length
1.	"Chime"		3:55
2.	"Kit Palette"		3:54
3.	"XOX"		3:20
4.	"Dame Dame da" (だめだめだ)	Aio	3:19
Total length:			14:28

== Charts ==
Weekly chart performance for Chime
Chart (2019)	Peak position
Japanese Singles Chart (Oricon)	35
Japanese Top Singles Sales (Billboard Japan)	37
