= Santa ni Kiss wo Shite =

Single by Ai Otsuka

from the album Love Pop
- Language: Japanese
- Released: November 17, 2021
- Genre: J-pop, Christmas music
- Length: 4:14
- Label: Avex Trax
- Songwriter: Aio

Ai Otsuka singles chronology
"Go" (2021)	"Santa ni Kiss wo Shite" (2021)	"Smily 2" (2022)

Music video
- "Santa ni Kiss wo Shite" on YouTube

"Santa ni Kiss wo Shite" (サンタにkissをして, lit. 'Kissing Santa') is a song by Japanese singer-songwriter Ai Otsuka. The song was released as a digital single on November 17, 2021, through Avex Trax.

== Background and release ==
"Santa ni Kiss o Shite" is Otsuka's first Christmas song, officially described as "a nostalgic song that will allow you to enjoy Christmas with your loved ones (...) no matter where you are." Otsuka revealed that the song was originally written seven or eight years prior to its release, but declared the song initially did not have a proper shape. She decided to perfect it during the creation of the Love Pop album, making it one of the cornerstones of that project.

The digital single's cover artwork, painted by Otsuka herself in oil, features a distinctive reindeer antler motif, blending artistic flair with festive charm. The design has been praised for its unique and eye-catching aesthetic, complementing the song's nostalgic and celebratory tone.

== Music video ==
The music video for "Santa ni Kiss o Shite" was filmed in April 2021 in the mountains of Niigata Prefecture, fulfilling Otsuka's desire to shoot in a wintery setting (despite opposition from her staff due to extreme conditions). Otsuka insisted on creative control, stating that the song's long development deserved a freely crafted video. Scenes of Otsuka painting this artwork are also featured in the music video, highlighting her multifaceted talents.

== Promotion ==
To celebrate the release of "Santa ni Kiss o Shite," a Line Music-exclusive campaign titled "Christmas Present from Ai Otsuka" (大塚 愛からのクリスマスプレゼント) was launched. Fans could participate for a chance to win special prizes chosen by Otsuka herself, with further details provided on her official website.

== Track listing ==
Santa ni Kiss wo Shite - Digital release
No.	Title	Writer(s)	Length
1.	"Santa ni Kiss wo Shite"	Aio	4:14
