= Naruto: Shippuden season 18 =

Naruto: Shippuden
- Season 18
- DVD cover for the Shippuden story arc titled The Fourth Great Ninja War: Obito Uchiha
- No. of episodes: 21

Release
- Original network: TV Tokyo
- Original release: August 21 – December 25, 2014

Season chronology
- ← Previous; Season 17 Next → Season 19

The eighteenth season of the anime television series Naruto: Shippuden is based on Part II of Masashi Kishimoto's Naruto manga series. The season continues the battle between the ninja alliance and Obito Uchiha. The episodes are directed by Hayato Date, and produced by Pierrot and TV Tokyo. The season aired from August to December 2014.

The season would make its English television debut on Adult Swim's Toonami programming block and aired from January 30 to June 5, 2022.

The DVD collection was released on April 1, 2015, under the title of The Fourth Great Ninja War: Obito Uchiha (忍界大戦・うちはオビト, Ninkai Taisen: Uchiha Obito).

The season contains four musical themes between two openings and two endings. The opening theme songs are "Guren" (紅蓮; "Crimson") performed by Does (used until episode 379) and "Silhouette" performed by Kana-Boon (used for episode 380 onwards). The ending theme songs are "Never Change" performed by Shun feat. Lyu:Lyu (used until episode 379) and "Dame Dame da" (だめだめだ; "It's Absolutely No Good") performed by Shiori Tomita (used from episode 380 onwards).

== Episodes ==
No. overall	No. in season	Title	Directed by	Written by	Animation directed by	Original release date	English air date
The Fourth Great Ninja War: Obito Uchiha
373	1	"Team 7, Assemble!"; Transliteration: "Dainanahan, Shūketsu!!" (Japanese: 第七班、集結!!)	Directed by : Takuma Suzuki; Storyboarded by : Hisashi Ishii	Yuka Miyata	Min-Seop Shin & Yūko Ishizaki	August 21, 2014	January 30, 2022
As the newly reformed Team 7 mobilizes to battle, the Ten-Tails creates an army of monsters to defend itself from the attack. Sakura Haruno recalls her previous missions, where she felt she was being left behind due to the immense competition of Naruto Uzumaki and Sasuke Uchiha, and endeavored to become capable like them. Her training with Tsunade made her stronger, and she learned one of Tsunade's jutsu. Back at the battle with the monsters of Ten-Tails, Teams 8 and 10 resolve to become stronger as well, but, as Hashirama notes, Ten-Tails constantly creates bigger and more powerful monsters. Sai, who is also determined to become capable and stronger, decides to attack Ten Tails' head by himself but is unsuccessful and quickly saved by Naruto. Sai discloses his worries about having to cover too much ground between the alliance and the main body of the Ten Tails, and in response, Naruto, Sasuke, and Sakura summon Gamakichi, Aoda, and Katsuyu, respectively, to help on the battlefield.
374	2	"The New Three-Way Deadlock"; Transliteration: "Aratanaru Sansukumi" (Japanese: 新たなる三竦み)	Directed by : Naoki Horiuchi; Storyboarded by : Yukihiro Matsushita	Yasuyuki Suzuki	Naoki Takahashi & Shinichi Suzuki	August 28, 2014	January 30, 2022
While Sakura uses Katsuyu to heal the injured members of the alliance, Naruto and Gamakichi jump over the Ten-Tails's army of monsters while Sasuke and Aoda push through it. Combining two of their strongest techniques into one attack, the two manage to deal a powerful blow to the Ten-Tails. Meanwhile, Orochimaru, Suigetsu, and Karin arrive at the battlefield where Madara fought the five Kage, where Tsunade is using Katsuyu to heal the other Kage but is too weak from her own injuries to make much progress. Suigetsu and Karin reluctantly help Tsunade recover, and Tsunade is shocked to learn that his former teammate Orochimaru is alive and helping to save her life. Orochimaru, Suigetsu and Karin leave to join the main battle, while Tsunade stays behind to revive the remaining Kage.
375	3	"Kakashi vs. Obito"; Transliteration: "Kakashi tai Obito" (Japanese: カカシVSオビト)	Hiroyuki Yamashita	Yasuyuki Suzuki & Shin Yoshida	Hiroyuki Yamashita	September 4, 2014	February 6, 2022
As Allied Shinobi Forces watch the Ten-Tails burn, Naruto wants to extract the Tailed Beasts from it, and Sasuke reveals his intention to completely destroy the Ten-Tails. But the monster severs the burning part of its body to escape death. Back in the other dimension, after his battle with Kakashi Hatake ends with them impaling each other with their attacks, Obito warps back to the battlefield. Seeing Obito return to their reality, lamenting not fighting Hashirama prior and that his apprentice outlived his purpose, Madara forces Obito to use the Art of Rinne Rebirth so he can be resurrected and become the Ten-Tails Jinchuriki. Producing a Shadow Clone to help Naruto and Sasuke stop Obito while Hashirama and Tobirama deal with Madara, Minato learns his former apprentice was the masked ninja from the night of his death with his wife Kushina Uzumaki. But matters worsen when Obito reveals he regained control of himself as he frees the Ten-Tails before absorbing it to become a Jinchuriki.
Extra edition
376	4	"The Directive to Take the Nine-Tails!"; Transliteration: "Kyūbi Gōdatsu Shirei" (Japanese: 九尾強奪指令)	Directed by : Kazuya Iwata; Storyboarded by : Shinji Satō	Yasuyuki Suzuki	Daiki Handa	September 11, 2014	February 13, 2022
Months prior to Sasuke defeating him, Orochimaru conducts an experiment where he used lightning to bring a robotic being to life. But he and Kabuto were forced to evacuate when the robot goes berserk and begins to destroy the building. The following day, the robot is found by Itachi and Kisame with Pain repairing it before he instructs Itachi to use the robot to capture Naruto. Sent into Konoha, the robot begins its search for Naruto while attacking several villagers and defeating Team Guy. Naruto himself shows up to stop the robot so that he can get back to training, his clones easily repelled yet manages to force the robot's cloak off. The robot is then revealed to be a mechanical replica of Naruto, whom is named Mecha-Naruto. Mecha-Naruto begins siphoning Naruto's Nine-Tails chakra, causing Naruto to lose his strength. Kakashi and Yamato arrive with the former distracting Mecha-Naruto with his Lightning Blade, giving Yamato the opportunity to save Naruto. The trio manages to escape using a secret tunnel and Mecha-Naruto responds by destroying the village in an effort to find Naruto. In the Hokage's office, Tsunade devises a plan to lure Mecha-Naruto away from the village: Naruto rides away from the village in a palanquin with Yamato while Choji, Kiba, Neji, and Shikamaru act as bearers and Kakashi as backup. The plan is put into action and Mecha-Naruto starts pursuing the palanquin. Shino, not wanting to be left behind like last time, attempts to distract Mecha-Naruto before being defeated. The group decides to escape into the forest with Shikamaru switching places with Kakashi in a futile attempt to defeat Mecha-Naruto. Back at Konoha, Tsunade orders Shizune to request assistance from the Hidden Sand.
377	5	"Naruto vs. Mecha Naruto"; Transliteration: "Naruto tai Meka Naruto" (Japanese: ナルト対メカナルト)	Directed by : Kazunori Mizuno; Storyboarded by : Shinji Satō	Yasuyuki Suzuki	Yūri Ichinose & Masaya Onishi	September 11, 2014	February 20, 2022
After Mecha-Naruto defeats Shikamaru, it intercepts the group by firing missiles, forcing them to take a detour into the forest again with Choji and Kiba each attempting to take out the robot but are defeated when their strongest attacks countered. Eventually, the palanquin falls over since no one was holding it in front, Mecha-Naruto attacks with Neji fending off the robot with his Eight Trigrams Palm Rotation. But Mecha-Naruto uses its amassed speed to counter Neji's defense while knocking him and Yamato out. Though Kakashi decides to battle Mecha-Naruto, he finds himself at a disadvantage against an enemy he cannot copy and quickly defeated. With no more in its way, Mecha-Naruto proceeds to extract the Nine-Tails from Naruto before Gaara appears. However, Deidara appears and mocks Gaara into pursuing him to settle things. But things worsen when Orochimaru summons a snake's stomach around Naruto and his opponent, revealing himself as Mecha-Naruto's creator while reprograming the robot to obey him. But Jiraiya and Gamabunta arrive to free Naruto before Orochimaru takes the two out. Things appeared hopeless until Naruto states that he will not give in until he saves Sasuke, activating a program that Itachi secretly inserted into Mecha-Naruto. Now aiding Naruto, Mecha-Naruto turns on Orochimaru before his creator bisects him in half. Orochimaru then proceeds to activate a switch, summoning a giant robot version of the Nine-Tails to destroy Konoha. Mecha-Naruto encases itself onto Naruto like a suit and both of them fly to Konoha to defeat the Mecha Nine-Tails, but their attacks have no effect. However, ejecting Naruto prior, Mecha-Naruto decides to sacrifice itself to destroy the Mecha Nine-Tails by using the leftover Nine-Tails chakra to fire its Tailed Beast Cannon which destroys both robots. The villagers celebrate Naruto's victory and the side story ends with the village being comically drowned in Gaara's Sand Tsunami.
The Fourth Great Ninja War: Obito Uchiha
378	6	"The Ten Tails' Jinchuriki"; Transliteration: "Jūbi no Jinchūriki" (Japanese: 十尾の人柱力)	Directed by : Takuma Suzuki; Storyboarded by : Yukihiro Matsushita	Shin Yoshida	Min-Seop Shin & Yūko Ishizaki	September 18, 2014	February 27, 2022
As the other Allied Shinobi wonder about the Ten-Tails's sudden disappearance, Hinata explains to Sakura that the monster's body and chakra were completely absorbed by Obito who became a Jinchuriki rather than perform the Rinne Rebirth for Madara. With him and Tobirama noting the new threat, Hashirama attempts to pin Obito. However, Hashirama's restraints prove useless against Obito as he destroys the Hokages' barrier with his chakra arms. As Minato tries to call out to his former student, and Hashirama unable to avoid an inpatient Madara, the other reanimated Hokage starts attacking the enemy by using their indestructible bodies to study Obito's power such as his ability to blend multiple chakra natures to produce a multipurpose substance. Minato goes on the offensive trying to exploit Obito's inability to suppress the Ten-Tails, only for Obito to dodge and grab Naruto and Sasuke by their necks. Luckily, Naruto uses his chakra arms to enable Minato to teleport him and Sasuke to safety as Obito begins to suffer the side effects of the Ten-Tails inside his body. Realizing Obito is open to attack, Minato decides to make his move with Naruto and Sasuke following. However, though his consciousness is being ripped apart by the Ten-Tails, Obito uses his memories of Rin and Team Minato to assert full control and assume a new form similar to the Sage of the Six Paths. Now in full control of himself, Obito forces Minato to teleport back after ripping the Fourth Hokage's arm off. But Sasuke and Naruto then noticed that Obito had attached some of the mysterious substance in place of Minato's missing arm, which is about to detonate.
379	7	"An Opening"; Transliteration: "Toppakō" (Japanese: 突破口)	Atsushi Nigorikawa	Katsuhiko Chiba	Kumiko Horikoshi	September 25, 2014	March 6, 2022
Before Minato could teleport away, Tobirama uses a shadow clone to take the detonating Truth Seeking Ball back to Obito who shields himself from the explosion. Meanwhile, the Allied Shinobi are intimidated while witnessing the god-like battle between Madara and Hashirama until Shikamaru uplifts their morale while telling them that because no matter how little power they have in comparison to the legendary ninja, even the smallest opening could be exploited. After readjusting their plan of attack, Naruto and Sasuke combine their techniques to create an opening but Tobirama and Minato strategically use their Flying Raijin techniques so that the Scorch Style Nimbus Tempest instead hits Obito. But Obito emerges from the flames, unscathed as it is revealed that the Truth Seeking Balls contain Yin-Yang chakra that negates the regenerative abilities of the reanimated ninja. Matters are worsened when Naruto's Nine-Tails Chakra Mode runs out while Gamakichi makes an attack on Obito with his Starch Syrup Gun before the Summoning Jutsu expires. From there, Obito berates the title of Hokage. But having seen the effect of Gamakichi's attack on Obito's barrier while angered by Obito's words, Naruto, with the help of Tobirama, successfully lands a senjutsu Rasengan on Obito's back. Minato amazes on Naruto becoming a Sage Mode like Jiraiya before being suddenly contacted by Yin-Kurama, who reminds him that Naruto did manage to befriend his other Yang half.
380	8	"The Day Naruto Was Born"; Transliteration: "Naruto ga Umareta Hi" (Japanese: ナルトが生まれた日)	Directed by : Masayuki Yamada; Storyboarded by : Shinji Satō	Yasuyuki Suzuki	Ik-Hyun Eum	October 2, 2014	March 13, 2022
Yin-Kurama asks Minato whether he intended to let Naruto clean up after him, telling him not to blame himself for his wife's death and that making his son the jinchuriki of Kurama's Yang half turned out good. Now seeing that he could not be careless now that Naruto found a means to injure him, Obito decides to casually begin Project Tsuki no Me by creating a giant flowering tree to wipe out the remaining Allied Shinobi with four Tailed Beast Balls. Furthermore, with Hashirama giving the Shinobi Alliance a plan through a wood clone as he cannot talk Madara into a momentary ceasefire to help them directly, everybody is fenced in by Obito's barrier so that they would not escape. Luckily, on a gambit, Naruto comes up with his own plan and asks Minato to bump fists with him so their respective Kuramas can connect through them. Obito wraps himself in a protective cloak, still berating Minato by reminding him that tomorrow is the anniversary of both his death and that of Kushina. But Naruto injects that the day is their birthday while Minato marvels at his grown-up son's courage. Once Naruto and Minato fist-bump, the Allied Shinobi chakra cloaks are rekindled by Kurama's chakra in its entirety. After Naruto provides Sasuke and Jugo with chakra cloaks, Tobirama sees the boy's chakra dispersal similar to the Shadow Clone Jutsu that he created in his lifetime, Minato uses his son's connection to everyone to teleport them all outside of the barrier. When Minato uses this reprieve so he can tell Naruto his feelings, the youth explains it is not necessary as both his father and Kushina already conveyed their feelings to him through their chakra imprints.
381	9	"The Divine Tree"; Transliteration: "Shinju" (Japanese: 神樹)	Directed by : Yoshihiro Yanagiya; Storyboarded by : Jun Kamiya	Yuka Miyata	Seiko Asai & Zenjirou Ukulele	October 9, 2014	March 20, 2022
With the Allied Shinobi teleported to safety, Yang-Kurama allows Naruto to use Sage Mode with his chakra and assumes Tailed Beast Mode as he and Minato attack Obito with renewed vigor. Under both Kuramas's advice, Naruto and Minato fully manifest the foxes as they use a senjutsu Rasengan on Obito. But the attack has no effect as Obito releases the Ten-Tails and has it assume its true form: a giant tree whose roots fatally drain caught shinobi of their chakra. Shocked that Obito is actually carrying out Project Tsuki no Me, Madara reveals to Hashirama that the Ten-Tails was originally the source of all chakra in the world: The Shinju. Madara proceeds to explain a legend of a princess named Kaguya Otsutsuki eating the chakra-rich fruit of the Shinju to end an epic war ages ago and that the once neutral tree transformed into an embodiment of its wrath after the birth of Kaguya's son: The first human born with chakra who would become the Sage of the Six Paths. As Naruto is saved from the Shinju's roots by Hiruzen, Madara tells Hashirama that he learned the legend from the stone tablet while explaining that the Shinju will could bring the Uchiha Clan's future as its time of blooming will be the moment the Infinite Tsukuyomi begins.
382	10	"A Shinobi's Dream"; Transliteration: "Shinobi no Yume" (Japanese: 忍の夢)	Directed by : Takuma Suzuki; Storyboarded by : Hisashi Ishii	Masahiro Hikokubo	Min-Seop Shin & Yūko Ishizaki	October 16, 2014	March 27, 2022
On Gaara's sand as they make towards the battlefield, the Kage see the Shinju and Katsuyu proceeds to explain the current situation. As the medical ninja come to Shikamaru's aid after barely surviving the Shinju and all of Katsuyu's extensions have been killed off, Naruto mourns the numerous deaths as Obito attempts to break his will once again while offering to spare those among the surviving Allied Ninja who would no longer resist the Infinite Tsukiyomi. But as his wood clone tells the Allied Ninja not to give in as Orochimaru arrives alongside Suigetsu and Karin, Hashirama continues battling Madara as the Uchiha, intending to take Obito's place once the time comes, reveals that the Shinju will bloom within fifteen minutes. Hashirama then relays the information to everyone via Ino's Mind Transmission to booster the allied ninjas' morale and not to give up. After a Susanoo-clad Sasuke asks him if he had reached his limit while cutting off one of the Shinju's branches, Naruto enters Sage Tailed Beast Mode and his thoughts of not losing anyone else ever again are conveyed to everyone through Ino's jutsu. Not wanting to be outdone, Sasuke has Jugo infuse his Susanoo with natural energy to join Naruto in fighting Obito. But when Hashirama notices the Allied Ninja still having doubts, he has Ino show everyone his memories of the first summit of the five Kage where he told the Kage of his time of his dream – to unite the shinobi world. With Hashirama renewing their determination, the allied ninja prepare themselves for battle as the five Kage arrives on the battlefield, all standing as a united front as the First Hokage's dream is realized.
383	11	"Pursuing Hope"; Transliteration: "Saki o Ou" (Japanese: 希望(さき)を追う)	Directed by : Masaaki Kumagai; Storyboarded by : Yukihiro Matsushita	Katsuhiko Chiba	Tatsuya Koyanagi, Yūri Ichinose & Kumiko Horikoshi	October 23, 2014	April 3, 2022
As the five Kage arrive to the battlefield, they see that this is no battle to be lost. Meanwhile, Naruto and Sasuke clash against Obito. As Sakura continues to heal Shikamaru, his treatment progresses little but Sakura promises not to let him die. Just then, Naruto's Version 1 cloak encases Shikamaru which Ino notes was being done subconsciously as an extension of Naruto's will. Shikamaru finally regains some strength and Tsunade arrives completely healing Shikamaru while praising Sakura that she has done well. After speaking briefly with her grandfather, Tsunade and the other Kage rally all the troops around them. Elsewhere in Kamui's dimension, Kakashi is almost ready to return to the battlefield once more. The Alliance then move out to destroy the Ten-Tails' tree form. Responding to his sensei's question, Orochimaru decides to take part as well and proceeds to attack the Ten-Tails with his snakes while Hiruzen destroys one of its branches with Enma's staff form. Tsunade and Sakura attempt to summon one-tenth of Katsuyu to aid in the recovery of the Alliance by using their seals together. Naruto and Sasuke continue their clash with Obito who easily evades all of their attacks. Noting it's time for them to sleep, Obito grabs the duo using chakra arms. Naruto and Sasuke are forced out of their Sage Tailed Beast Mode and Susanoo completely. As Obito demands to know why Naruto still fights, he proudly states that never going back on his word is his nindō. Naruto declares that he will sleep tomorrow and dream on his own as Sasuke's Susanoo encases Naruto's Tailed Beast Mode. Elsewhere in Kamui's dimension, while realizing that Obito still possesses his Will of Fire despite his hatred, Kakashi prepares to return to their reality.
384	12	"A Heart Filled With Comrades"; Transliteration: "Nakama de Michita Kokoro" (Japanese: 仲間で満ちた心)	Directed by : Naoki Horiuchi; Storyboarded by : Toshihiko Masuda	Yasuyuki Suzuki	Naoki Takahashi & Shinichi Suzuki	October 30, 2014	April 10, 2022
Connected to Obito through his Sharingan, Kakashi indirectly witnesses Sasuke's Susanoo equipping itself onto Naruto's Sage Chakra-enhanced Yang-Kurama construct. Obito responds by manifesting a gigantic shield and the Sage of the Six Paths's legendary Sword of Nunoboko. Naruto counters by creating nine Rasengan in Yang-Kurama's tails, instructing Sai, Lee, Tenten, Team Asuma and Team Kurenai to enter the tails where they manifest their own Tailed Beast Mode Mantles. As the nine ninja launch the Rasengan at him, Obito begins to have strange visions before the Susano-Armored Yang-Kurama inflicts the final blow so the tailed beast and Naruto can start freeing the sealed tailed beasts. However, Obito struggles against Naruto in a tug-of-war as Gaara and Killer Bee assist Naruto to pull out the chakra of their respective tailed beasts. The remainder of the Konoha 11, Sasuke, and the Allied Shinobi Forces also join in the effort to pull out the tailed beasts with the Shinju losing its power. Within his subconscious, seeing himself alone against the entire Alliance, Obito begins to contemplate his life choices and what could have been while grappling to what he believed to be regret. Against Yang-Kurama's discretion, an empathic Naruto uses the connection to reach Obito's consciousness with the intent to unmask the real Obito Uchiha.
385	13	"Obito Uchiha"; Transliteration: "Uchiha Obito" (Japanese: うちはオビト)	Kazunori Mizuno	Junki Takegami & Shin Yoshida	Shiro Kudaka & Masaya Onishi	November 6, 2014	April 17, 2022
As Naruto reaffirms Obito's existence, the Uchiha says it does not matter anymore as he had transcended into the "Second Six Paths". Refusing to accept Obito's insistence, Naruto tells him they are very similar in many ways yet explains to Obito that no one will accept him because his dream would rob others of their freedom. Obito retorts that it was because of the similarities that he wanted Naruto to see the world as he does and abandon his ideals before suffering from them. Obito also explains, despite Naruto saying he simply running away from life, that he is acting like Hokage to achieve true peace via a short cut. Still adamant in his beliefs, Naruto tells Obito that there was no shortcut to the dream of being Hokage who was a person who was supposed to go before everyone and make the way easier for them to follow.
386	14	"I'm Always Watching"; Transliteration: "Chanto Miteru" (Japanese: ちゃんと見てる)	Kazuya Iwata	Junki Takegami & Shin Yoshida	Daiki Handa	November 13, 2014	April 24, 2022
As Naruto remains determined to convince him to see the error of his ways, Obito begins to reminisce more of his past with Team Minato and how Rin always looked after and truly cared for him. Naruto believes Obito still has bonded with his friends, proven when he remembered his old teammates to maintain control of his consciousness when the Ten-Tails attempted to consume his mind. Obito is seemingly hesitant whether or not he is doing the right thing. Naruto notes that he won't allow Obito to drag everyone onto his path and continue his plan any longer. Naruto then reaches his hand out to Obito while telling him to accept himself as a Shinobi of the Leaf once more and atone for his crimes.
387	15	"The Promise That Was Kept"; Transliteration: "Mamorareta Yakusoku" (Japanese: 守られた約束)	Atsushi Nigorikawa	Yuka Miyata	Chiyuki Tanaka	November 20, 2014	May 1, 2022
The tree was starting to bloom. Despite Naruto reaching out to him, Obito attempts to strangle the youth while claiming he has no regrets for the path he has chosen. Frustrated while breaking out of the Uchiha's hold, Naruto punches Obito while telling him not to underestimate the power of everyone. As Naruto forcibly pulls Obito's hand to his side within the Uchiha's mind, the Allied Shinobi Forces succeed in freeing the tailed beasts from the Uchiha's body. Lying on the ground, a defeated Obito looks up to the moon while grieving that he could not fill the hole in his heart. As the tailed beasts thank Naruto while regaining their corporeal forms. the Allied Shinobi Forces decide to kill the weakened Obito before Kakashi returns to their reality to kill his former friend. However, Kakashi is stopped at the last second by Minato who reveals Obito's sudden change of heart. However, Minato tells Naruto that Kakashi is the only person who understands Obito's despair as Naruto understands Sasuke's solitude then Naruto began to wonder if Obito was more similar to Sasuke and if he is similar to Kakashi. Meanwhile Kakashi puts down his kunai as he tells a doubtful Obito that Naruto would have never ended up like him because he had friends who would help him whenever he faltered. At that time, Naruto proceeds to locate Madara and Hashirama in order to help in sealing the Uchiha. Standing atop the Shinju, Naruto starts to produce a Massive Rasenshuriken - one large enough to illuminate the footprints of his comrades.
388	16	"My First Friend"; Transliteration: "Saisho no Tomo" (Japanese: 最初の友)	Directed by : Yoshihiko Iwata; Storyboarded by : Shinji Satō	Masahiro Hikokubo	Min-Seop Shin & Yūko Ishizaki	November 27, 2014	May 8, 2022
As Obito lies down, he watches on as Naruto uses his Massive Rasenshuriken to weaken Madara enough for Hashirama to immobilize the Uchiha with Wood Dragons while siphoning his chakra. With Naruto throwing his attack, with Sai escorting him soon after, the Shinobi Alliance march towards Madara's location to help in sealing him away. Meanwhile, Gaara asks Shukaku to aid in the sealing with the One-Tailed only agreeing to prove his superiority over Kurama. As the sand-manipulating duo prepares to head out, Son Goku questions the young Kazekage if he is a friend of Naruto. As the tailed beasts begin to move towards the trapped Madara, Gaara recalls his painful childhood as a One-Tailed Jinchuriki feared by his people and how that all changed when Naruto became his first friend.
Standalone side story
389	17	"The Adored Elder Sister"; Transliteration: "Akogare no Nē-sama" (Japanese: 憧れの姉さま)	Maki Odaira	Yuka Miyata	Kumiko Horikoshi	December 4, 2014	May 8, 2022
While still attending the Ninja Academy at the Hidden Leaf, Hinata is passionately welcomed home by her younger sister Hanabi. Though Hanabi wanted to play with her, Hinata told her she needs to train with their father. The next morning while walking with her caretaker Natsu through the village, they witness Naruto scolding the merchant. Natsu tells Hanabi to leave Naruto alone before returning home to finish her work. Afterwards, she peeks on Hinata's training session with Neji before witnessing their father using Byakugan on Neji from activating his curse seal. The Hyuga Clan's Elder, noticing that Hanabi was peeking earlier, approaches his granddaughter and explains what happened as well as the destiny of the Branch Family to protect the Byakugan. The next day, Hiashi becomes Hinata's sparring partner as it eventually becomes clear to the Elder that Hinata is not fit to be the clan's heiress. When Hanabi's own talents are realized by the Hyuga Elder and fearing Hinata's inability, Hiashi arranges a fight between the two sisters to determine which one of them would be the future heiress. The battle ends with Hanabi defeating Hinata and being declared as the clan's new heiress by their father.
390	18	"Hanabi's Decision"; Transliteration: "Hanabi no Ketsui" (Japanese: ハナビの決意)	Directed by : Kiyoshi Murayama; Storyboarded by : Yukihiro Matsushita	Yuka Miyata	Takayoshi Hayashi, Hiroki Abe, Shigeki Awai & Hae-Ran Shin	December 4, 2014	May 15, 2022
As Hanabi continues her training with her father after Hinata is left in the care of Kurenai, she thinks to herself that she is destined to be stronger than her sister. A year later, Hanabi is informed by Natsu that Hinata will be participating in the Chunin Exams but notes that it is a waste of time. Later learning her older sister got heavily injured after her match with Neji, Hanabi rushes to the Hospital. Asking why she did not withdraw, Hinata responds that she is not willing to give up and her ninja way of not going back on her word. Hanabi later attends the Chunin Exams's semifinals with her father to witness Neji's defeat by Naruto. She is later seen training to use the Eight Trigrams Palm Rotation under her father's supervision but fails to master it. When Hanabi watches Hinata train with Neji, she wonders why her sister is so confident despite being deemed a failure by their father. Later upon returning to the village from a trip years later, Hanabi and her father are informed of the Akatsuki's assault on Konoha and that Hinata stood her ground against Pain. Upon realizing Hinata's confidence and determination, Hanabi begins to admire her sister once more and is eager to train with her father to grow stronger herself.
The Fourth Great Ninja War: Obito Uchiha
391	19	"Madara Uchiha Arises"; Transliteration: "Uchiha Madara, Tatsu" (Japanese: うちはマダラ、立つ)	Masaaki Kumagai	Yasuyuki Suzuki	Yūri Ichinose & Daisuke Tsumagari	December 11, 2014	May 22, 2022
Though trapped by Hashirama with the Shinobi Alliance approaching to seal him, a grinning Madara attacks. With Yin-Kurama explaining to Minato that Obito will survive the extraction process as he still linked to the Gedo Statue inside his body, Obito lies down in defeat, nothing but Rin was his only light and hope in life and that the world began to change after her demise. After remembering Nagato's act of betrayal towards him in reviving Konoha's people, Obito finally understands Nagato's reasons for helping Naruto are tied to the teachings of Jiraiya that gave them, hope for a better future. Obito, noting his mentor was also a student of Jiraiya's, resolves to sacrifice himself to revive those who died in the Great Ninja War with the Samsara of Heavenly Life. But Black Zetsu emerges from the ground and grabs Obito, engulfing the Uchiha's body to force him focus the technique on solely Madara as Sai fails to seal him. Though Madara is ecstatic to truly enjoy the thrills of war, his eyes crumble as their living counterparts were not present at the time of his death. Removing his armor after emerging unscathed from the flames of Sasuke's Amaterasu, Madara turns his attention to Hashirama as he activates the stakes he placed on his rival during their fight and siphons the First Hokage's sage chakra. Though Sasuke resorts fighting Madara with his katana, he is easily overwhelmed by the eyeless Uchiha who considers taking the youth's eyes before offering an alliance between them. But Sasuke refuses and Madara attacks him and the others before setting his sights on the approaching Tailed Beasts. Elsewhere, Kakashi and Minato question just what had happened, and Tobi Zetsu and White Zetsu explain that Madara has been fully resurrected.
392	20	"The Hidden Heart"; Transliteration: "Ura no Kokoro" (Japanese: 裏の心)	Directed by : Masayuki Yamada; Storyboarded by : Shinji Satō	Katsuhiko Chiba	Ik-Hyun Eum	December 18, 2014	May 29, 2022
As the Shinobi Alliance fall back when the tailed beasts proceed to fighting Madara head on, Gaara supports Shukaku by immobilizing Madara with their Grand Sand Mausoleum Seal. But Madara escapes with his sussano before the sealing is complete and the sealing is complete. But Naruto and Yang Kurama leads the counterattack on the Gedo statue with the tailed beasts using their tails as whips, forcing Madara to fall back while losing his right arm. A White Zetsu then emerges, giving Madara his original right eye as Madara loops off the entity's arm to serve as a replacement limb while his injuries heal. After inserting his right eye back into its socket, Madara controls the Gedo Statue. Kakashi attempts to stop the statue but only manages to amputate one of its arms. Standing atop the statue Obito uses his Rinnegan to repel the tailed beasts before having the Gedo Statue unleash its chains to restrain them with the intent to extract Gyūki and Yang Kurama first. Attempting to fight the restraints alongside Killer Bee, Naruto finds he cannot cancel his Tailed Beast Mode. Deeming Naruto's efforts to suppress Yang Kurama's chakra futile, Madara redirects his focus on Shukaku at the White Zetsu's inquiry. But Gaara attempts to use his Desert Hands to save Shukaku to the tailed beast's shock after what he put his former Jinchuriki through. This causes Shukaku to remember his previous Jinchuriki host, Bunpuku and realizes that Gaara is the person whom the One-Tail was told would teach him the meaning of "heart" and "acceptance". Seeing Madara about to use his Susanoo to kill Gaara, Shukaku deflects the attack with his Absolute Defense. But Madara breaks the chain Gaara was holding and reattaches them to resume sealing Shukaku.
393	21	"A True Ending"; Transliteration: "Hontō no Owari" (Japanese: 本当の終わり)	Directed by : Kazunori Mizuno; Storyboarded by : Yukihiro Matsushita	Shin Yoshida	Masaya Onishi & Mai Toda	December 25, 2014	June 5, 2022
Shukaku stops Susanoo's Sword but Madara sends it towards Gaara who is saved by his sand, which leads Shukaku to tell him not to overdo it but Gaara continues to fight to declare he is now the One-Tail's equal. The tailed beasts are then dragged into the Gedo Statue, Killer Bee severing one of Gyuki's tentacles while Yang Kurama ejects Naruto after telling Gaara to catch the unconscious youth. After the tailed beasts have been sealed into the Gedo Statue, White Zetsu reports that preparations are done at their end, Madara faces Tobirama as Gaara flies Naruto away from the fight. As Madara overpowers Tobirama, Sasuke prepares to join the fray after Hashirama infuses a bit of his chakra in the young Uchiha along with a "technique" to counter Madara's Sage chakra. Though Sasuke attempts his attack with Tobirama providing a distraction, the young Uchiha finds himself suspended in midair before Madara impales him. Elsewhere, Tobi Zetsu appears to assault the Shinobi Alliance using a small version of Hashirama's Wood Style: Several Thousand Hands with Hiruzen fending off the attack. Meanwhile, Orochimaru and Taka take cover to plan a surprise attack while Karin bursts into tears after sensing Sasuke's predicament. At the same time, Gaara brings Naruto to Tsunade with Sakura attempting to keep Naruto alive. However, Tobi Zetsu and White Zetsu reveal that Naruto is on the verge of death since Yang Kurama was extracted from him. As grief overtakes both Sakura and Karin, the two realize that Naruto and Sasuke will both die if things continue like this.

== Home media release ==
=== Japanese ===
Volume	Date	Discs	Episodes	Reference
Volume 1	April 1, 2015	1	373–375, 378	
Volume 2	May 13, 2015	1	379–382	
Volume 3	June 3, 2015	1	383–386	
Volume 4	July 1, 2015	1	387–390	
Volume 5	August 5, 2015	1	391–393	

=== English ===
Viz Media (North America – Region 1/A)
Box set	Date	Discs	Episodes	Reference
30	April 4, 2017	2	375–388	
31	June 27, 2017	2	389–402	

Manga Entertainment (United Kingdom and Ireland – Region 2/B)
Volume	Date	Discs	Episodes	Reference
30	November 27, 2017	2	375–387	
31	February 26, 2018	2	388–401	

Madman Entertainment (Australia and New Zealand – Region 4/B)
Collection	Date	Discs	Episodes	Reference
30	June 7, 2017	2	375–387	
31	September 6, 2017	2	388–401	
