= Fruits Basket (2019 TV series) =

Japanese anime television series

The 2019 anime series Fruits Basket is the second anime based on the manga series of the same name by Natsuki Takaya, adapted from all 23 volumes of the story. The new anime adaptation was announced in November 2018, featuring a new cast and staff, with TMS Entertainment handling the 63 episodes-long productions from April 2019 to June 2021. The show was divided into three seasons. Yoshihide Ibata directed the series, Taku Kishimoto served as a screenwriter, and Masaru Shindou designed the characters. The reboot is a co-production of Funimation, who released the series through the Crunchyroll-Funimation partnership plus the study of the anime series

The first season adapted the manga's first 5 volumes and parts of volumes 6 and 7. It ran for 25 episodes from April 6 to September 21, 2019, on TV Tokyo, TV Osaka, and TV Aichi. The first opening theme for episodes 1–13 is "Again" by Beverly. The second opening theme for episodes 14–25 is "Chime" by Ai Otsuka. The first ending theme for episodes 1–13 is "Lucky Ending" by Vickeblanka. The second ending theme for episodes 14–25 is "One Step Closer" by INTERSECTION.

The second season adapted the rest of volumes 6 and 7 and all content from volume 8 to the beginning of volume 17. It aired from April 7 to September 22, 2020. The third opening theme for episodes 26–38 is "Prism" by AmPm ft Miyuna. The fourth opening theme for episodes 39 onwards is "Home" by Toki Asako. The third ending theme for episodes 26–38 is "ad meliora" by THE CHARM PARK. The fourth ending theme for episodes 39 onwards is "Eden" by Monkey Majik.

The third and final season adapted from the rest of volume 17 up to the end of the series. It aired from April 6 to June 29, 2021, titled Fruits Basket: The Final. The fifth opening theme is "Pleasure", by WARPs UP, and the fifth ending theme is "Haru Urara" by GENIC.

Funimation licensed the 2019 remake anime for a simulcast in partnership with Crunchyroll and produced an English version as part of their simuldub program. Unlike the Japanese version, a good majority of the English dub's cast reprised their roles from the original anime. Funimation's English dub of the remake series began airing on ABC Me in Australia starting on June 19, 2020, Episode 19 was skipped in ABC Me's broadcast run, likely due to the episode's content.

== Series overview ==
Season	Episodes	Originally released	
Season	Episodes	First released	Last released
1	25	April 6, 2019	September 21, 2019
2	25	April 7, 2020	September 22, 2020
3	13	April 6, 2021	June 29, 2021

== Episodes ==
=== Season 1 (2019) ===
No.	Title	Original release date	English air date
1	"I'm Going"; Transliteration: "Ittekimasu" (Japanese: 行ってきます)	March 16, 2019 (theater); April 6, 2019	June 19, 2020
Tohru Honda, a high school girl living in a tent in the woods, passes by a nearby house where she has an encounter with her classmate Yuki Sohma and meets the house's owner, Yuki's cousin Shigure Sohma. Yuki then accompanies Tohru to school, where she is harassed by some of Yuki's admirers until she is saved by her friends Arisa Uotani and Saki Hanajima. Later at night, Yuki and Shigure see Tohru returning to the tent and learn that she was originally living with her grandfather after her parents died, but her grandfather's house is currently under renovations and she does not want to impose herself on her other relatives or friends. After the tent is hit by a landslide, Tohru accepts Yuki and Shigure's offer to live temporarily with them, when Yuki is attacked by his cousin Kyo Sohma, who suddenly appears to challenge him to a fight. Amidst the commotion, Tohru ends up accidentally embracing Yuki, Kyo and Shigure, who turn into a rat, a cat and a dog respectively, much to her surprise.
2	"They're All Animals!"; Transliteration: "Minasan ga dōbutsuna ndesu!" (Japanese: みなさんが動物なんです！)	March 16, 2019 (theater); April 13, 2019	June 26, 2020
Shigure explains to the surprised Tohru that apart from himself, Yuki and Kyo, 10 other members of the Sohma family would transform into an animal of the Chinese zodiac whenever they feel weak, stressed or being embraced by someone of the opposite gender. Tohru promises to keep the Sohmas' family secret. Yuki is concerned that her memory would be erased by the order of the family head Akito Sohma but Shigure does not believe the situation is the same as the previous incident when a younger Yuki had turned into a rat while playing with friends. Shigure also has an angry Kyo transferred to Tohru and Yuki's school after the former had been training for four months instead of attending his previous school. The next day at school, Yuki is touched by Tohru's request that he remains to be a friend to her if her memory is to be erased, while Kyo's awkwardness around girls leads him to yell angrily at Tohru, sending her into a depression. In an act of atonement, after Shigure's encouragement, he escorts Tohru back home from her part-time job.
3	"Let's Play Rich Man-Poor Man!"; Transliteration: "Dai hinmin o yarimashou" (Japanese: 大貧民をやりましょう)	April 20, 2019	July 3, 2020
In preparation for the school cultural festival, the class decides to establish a rice ball stand. Kyo walks out of the class when his idea is rejected (and is suddenly surrounded by kittens) but admits later to Tohru that Yuki will ensure everything runs smoothly. Kyo soon gets baited into playing Rich Man-Poor Man by Tohru's friends and eventually loses. At the same time Yuki turns down a female student and sees Kyo getting along with others quite well with envy. While Yuki and Tohru tend to the vegetable garden due to an unexpected typhoon storm, Yuki confesses his jealously of Kyo being able to interact easily while Yuki feels more isolated from others. Tohru encourages him to be more socially interactive to everyone, following her mother's words to be positive with other people. The next day Tohru begins making rice balls in preparation for the festival when she sees a shy girl outside the front door asking for Kyo.
4	"What Year Is She?"; Transliteration: "Nanidoshi no Katana nodesu ka?" (Japanese: なにどしの方なのですか？)	April 27, 2019	July 10, 2020
The shy girl, named Kagura Sohma, arrives at the house and finds Kyo, then begins to aggressively pummel him for making her worry. Kagura claims that she is Kyo's fiancée, though Kyo points out that it was under duress when Kagura brandished a knife when they were kids. Believing Tohru to be a rival for Kyo's affections, she challenges her, but Kyo shuts her mouth when she mentions his "true form". To prove her love, Kagura insists on cooking dinner. The magnificent feast she cooks, however, is ruined when Kagura gets too violent at Kyo's refusal to join. Kyo's irritation leaves her hurt and runs off to buy more food, but is accompanied by Tohru on the way back to the house. Kagura realizes that Tohru loved the Cat in the zodiac story, hence why she likes Kyo. The two girls start cooking hamburgers together, while later on Kyo tells Tohru his excitement in learning martial arts. The next day, Kagura became upset that Kyo was being mean to her, but accidentally get embraced by a paperboy in the rush and she was turned into a boar, though Yuki stopped him from seeing her. Tohru then tells Kagura that she wanted to be someone like her who can see great things about the person she likes. As Kagura goes home, Tohru receives a call from her grandfather about some unexpected news.
5	"I've Been Fooling Myself"; Transliteration: "Kanchigai o shite imashita" (Japanese: 勘違いをしていました)	May 4, 2019	July 17, 2020
Tohru announces that the renovations at her grandfather's house have been completed, and would be moving back in the next day. Her decision leaves the Sohmas seemingly in agreement that her stay with them was only a temporary circumstance. The next day, Tohru arrives back at her grandfather's place and is greeted by her relatives whom he was staying with. Later, Tohru's aunt reveals that she had known about Tohru's living arrangement with the Sohmas, thanks to a private detective and is concerned that this (including Kyoko's violent past) would negatively affect her son's ambitions to become a police officer. The discussion comes to a head stop when Tohru's grandfather slaps the son following his jeers at her, and the grandfather allows Tohru to live freely (as her parents had done) if she wants. Tohru breaks down as she truthfully reveals that she wants to spend more time with the Sohmas. Yuki and Kyo, who were both listening in from the outside after being bothered by Tohru's parting, arrive to take Tohru back to their home. Yuki tells off the aunt's son for his slander to Tohru, while Kyo tells Tohru that it is alright to be selfish once in a while, causing Tohru to remember her mother giving her the exact same advice when she was young. Thus, Tohru joyfully moves back in with the Sohmas.
6	"Perhaps We Should Invite Ourselves Over"; Transliteration: "Oshama sa sete moraō kashira" (Japanese: お邪魔させてもらおうかしら)	May 11, 2019	July 24, 2020
The rice ball stand at the school festival is a success, mainly due to Yuki reluctantly cross-dressing at the third years' insistence. Momiji Sohma and Hatori Sohma also visit the stand. Momiji causes chaos when he hugs Tohru and transforms into a rabbit, though Yuki is able to distract the potential witnesses. On the school rooftop, Hatori cunningly takes a picture of Yuki and Kyo at Akito's request and leaves with Momiji. As they leave, Yuki warns Tohru not to be alone with Hatori as he is the doctor who wipes people's memories. After the festival ends, Tohru's best friends Arisa and Saki confront her about their suspicions of her close relationship with Yuki and Kyo, which Tohru inadvertently reveals that she is living with them. To confirm for themselves, Arisa and Saki invite themselves to a sleepover at the Sohmas' house. That night, the pair find that Tohru is living quite comfortably and happily with the Sohmas, while Yuki and Kyo assuage their concerns that Tohru is the type of person who would never ask for her friends' help even though she deserves it. Tohru herself later recounts to Arisa and Saki how she was saved by a young boy in guiding her back home after getting lost, and had kept the boy's cap as a memento, with Kyo listening in. The next morning, Arisa and Saki give the Sohmas their blessing to look after Tohru, albeit in a manner resembling parents giving away their bride. The episode ends as Tohru answers a phone call from Hatori, asking her to come over to the Sohma family residence and see him alone.
7	"Spring Comes"; Transliteration: "Haru ni narimasu ne" (Japanese: 春になりますね)	May 18, 2019	July 31, 2020
Tohru is summoned to the Sohma family estate where she is greeted by Hatori and Momiji. Hatori advises Tohru to stop associating with the Sohma family lest she becomes burdened by the family curse. When Hatori leaves the room to answer the visiting Shigure, Momiji states that Hatori had to wipe the memory of his relationship with a woman. Later, Tohru accompanies Hatori when Tohru's mis-step causes him to instinctively catch her, turning him into a seahorse (a sign of the Dragon zodiac). While Tohru attempts to help the unconscious Hatori, he flashes back to when he first met his assistant, Kana Sohma, two years previously. The pair were soon in a relationship for two months, even after Kana found out Hatori's secret. It ended, however, when Akito threw into a violent temper that caused Hatori to nearly go blind in his left eye and then blamed Kana. Kana soon became mentally ill, forcing Hatori to wipe her memories of their relationship at Akito's suggestion. Hatori wakes up and soon hears a passing Kana being engaged with someone else, making him happy that she has moved on. When Hatori asks Tohru what happens to snow when melted, Tohru simply replies "Spring comes", the same answer Kana gave. Hatori later leaves Tohru with Shigure. After she catches a glimpse of Akito and Kureno, Tohru asks Shigure about the curse, who declined to answer for the time being.
8	"See You When You Get Back"; Transliteration: "Itterasshai" (Japanese: 行ってらっしゃい)	May 25, 2019	August 7, 2020
Arisa and Saki ask Tohru if she can spend the New Year's Eve at either of their houses, but Tohru declines and goes back to the Sohmas' house. The next day, after Tohru and the Sohmas clean the house, Shigure informs Tohru that the Sohmas will be spending the New Year's Eve at the Sohmas' family estate for the banquet, though Kyo and Yuki refuse to go (as both are afraid of Kagura and Akito respectively). Tohru insists that Kyo and Yuki go with Shigure to celebrate at the family estate while she stays in the house all by herself. However, on their way there, the Sohmas encounter Saki, where she points out that Tohru will truly feel alone as it would be the first time she will spend the New Year without her mother. This causes Yuki and Kyo to rush back home, where Tohru is tearfully happy that they're back. Meanwhile, Shigure meets Hatori and Hatsuharu Sohma, who notice that Kyo and Yuki are not coming. Back at Shigure's house, Tohru, Kyo, and Yuki climb up to the rooftop to watch the sunrise to start their new year together.
9	"Yuki Was My First Love"; Transliteration: "Yūki wa ore no Hatsukoidakara" (Japanese: ゆきはおれの初恋だから)	June 1, 2019	August 14, 2020
The third term begins, but despite Tohru wishing for them to get along, Kyo and Yuki are still at odds with each other. Later that night, Yuki catches a cold, but he insists on going to school for a long-distance run event, especially when Kyo challenges him to a race. The next day, during the long-distance run, Tohru meets Hatsuharu, who interrupts the race between Kyo and Yuki by tripping up the former. Hatsuharu then challenges Kyo to a fight to make up for Kyo's absence in New Year's, where his personality switches to "Black Haru". However, the fight stops when Yuki collapses from the fever, and, after hugging Tohru, Hatsuharu transforms into an ox to take Yuki back home. Back at Shigure's house, Tohru is worried about Yuki and decides to watch over him with Hatsuharu while Shigure and Kyo went back to school to pick up their belongings. Hatsuharu then explains to Tohru that when he, Kyo, and Yuki were kids back then, he used to hate Yuki, but when Yuki smiled at him, he fell in love with him. Yuki wakes up from the fever, but then he turns back to a rat when Hatsuharu told Tohru to call him by his given name. After playing poker with Saki at school, Kyo and Shigure both catch a cold and turn into their animal forms by the episode's end.
10	"It's Valentine's, After All"; Transliteration: "Datte, Barentainda mon" (Japanese: だって、バレンタインだもん)	June 8, 2019	August 21, 2020
Kyo wakes up from a nightmare he had and goes to school without eating breakfast. Learning that day is the day before Valentine's Day, Kyo unsuccessfully attempts to flee from school. After school, Tohru and Kyo meet Kagura again, the girl being the main reason for Kyo's worry of Valentine's. Back at Shigure's house, Kagura invites Kyo on a date at Valentine's Day. When he refuses so she invites Tohru and Yuki too and make it a double date. When Kagura leaves, Shigure pushes Kyo too far when he states that, even though he hates Yuki, Kyo is afraid of getting to know him, forcing Kyo to run away. Worrying about him, Tohru catches up to Kyo, encouraging him that he does not have to get along with Yuki if he does not want to. On Valentine's Day, Tohru and Yuki accompany Kyo and Kagura for their double date, while Shigure delivers the chocolates to Hatori and the other Sohma members for Tohru. After arriving at Hatori's house, Shigure discusses with Hatori about Tohru, their dreams when they were kids, and Shigure's manipulation of Tohru for his own ends. He then visits Akito for a while before returning home. As night falls, Tohru and the Sohmas meet Mitsuru, Shigure's editor, who is concerned about Shigure's laziness.
11	"This Is a Wonderful Inn"; Transliteration: "Tottemo sutekina o yadodesu" (Japanese: とってもステキなお宿です)	June 15, 2019	August 28, 2020
After the end-of-term tests, Momiji invites Tohru, Yuki and a reluctant Kyo to a hot springs inn owned by the Sohma family for White Day. When Shigure asks Tohru about her financial situation, she evades the question, causing the Sohmas to realize that she used all her part-time earnings from the previous month buying Valentines chocolates for them. As she bathes, Momiji compares her to a traveler in a story who was duped into giving everything away to strangers, and eventually eaten by demons taking advantage of her kindness. The next day Tohru and the Sohma boys visit the inn and spend the night there. In the hot spring, the hostess hopes that Tohru will meet her child, who is the Monkey of the zodiac, and become friends. Meanwhile, Yuki presents a ribbon to Tohru as his return gift afterward. The next morning, Momiji reveals that he and Hatsuharu will be joining her high school as first years, though Tohru is more shocked that Momiji is a year younger than her despite his young appearance.
12	"You Look Like You're Having Fun"; Transliteration: "Tanoshi-sōda ne" (Japanese: 楽しそうだね)	June 22, 2019	September 4, 2020
The second school year begins with Tohru looking forward to meet Hatsuharu and Momiji as first years, with Kyo reluctantly accompanying her. However, Kyo is shocked that Momiji is wearing a girl's uniform and Hatsuharu is wearing jewelry and having two different hair colors, which they got scolded by the student council president Takei Makoto. Hatsuharu then aggressively defend Momiji by beating up Takei, and also prove why he has two different hair colors before Takei leaves. Later, Tohru meets Akito Sohma, the current head of the Sohma family and the one Momiji warns Yuki and Kyo not to cross paths with. When Yuki sees Tohru with Akito, he rushes towards them, and after watching Yuki quivering in fear when Akito confronts him for skipping the New Year's celebration, Tohru pushes Akito away. Akito then leaves the school grounds as Kyo watches from the distance. Back at the Sohma family estate, Shigure discusses with Hatori of Akito's low opinion of Tohru, the time where Akito psychologically tortured Yuki in the past, and the fact that Tohru may be the one person who can soothe the pain, something that Akito does not understand. After playing badminton until the sun sets, Tohru speaks with her mother in her thoughts, wondering what kind of zodiac is Akito, despite being a little afraid of him, though after spending time with her friends, that fear feels worlds away. Hatsuharu in turn thanks Tohru for cheering Yuki up after the confrontation with Akito.
13	"How Have You Been, My Brother?"; Transliteration: "Genkide ita ka na? Waga otōto yo" (Japanese: 元気でいたかな？我が弟よっ)	June 29, 2019	September 11, 2020
A few days after Tohru meeting Akito, Yuki's older brother Ayame Sohma, the Snake of the zodiac, visits the house, much to Yuki's displeasure. Ayame takes an instant liking to Tohru and rushes her to a gyoza restaurant for lunch. He confides in her that the brothers are not close for years partly due to Yuki's childhood isolation and wishes to reconcile with Yuki, particularly after hearing Akito confronting Yuki at school and is concerned it would depress him. Tohru comforts him that her mother only learned about a parent's worries when she became a parent herself but never forgotten the memories of being a child. Although Ayame is unsuccessful in getting closer with Yuki, he does not leave Shigure's house until the afternoon next day, when Hatori arrives to take him back at Hatsuharu's request. Afterwards, Yuki acknowledges his brother wanting to bond with him.
14	"That's a Secret"; Transliteration: "Himitsudayo" (Japanese: ヒミツだよ)	July 6, 2019	September 18, 2020
One year has passed since the death of Tohru's mother Kyoko. After school, during Tohru's part-time job, Momiji tells her about his mother, his father, and his little sister, Momo. However, Tohru notices that Momiji's mother does not remember him. Momiji recites how on the day he was born, his mother rejected him after finding out he turned into rabbit when embracing him, an effect of the Sohma curse. When the mother stabbed herself, Momiji's father suggested that it would be better if she would forget about him. Thus, Hatori wiped her memories of Momiji so she would not regret giving birth to "that creature". As a result, Momo does not realize that Momiji is her older brother while he watches them from afar. Tohru is saddened about what his mother did, especially when the story reminded her of the day Kyoko died, but someday like Momiji, she wants to embrace all of her memories and consider those memories precious. The next day, Tohru, Yuki, and Kyo went to visit Kyoko's grave with Arisa (wearing the "Crimson Butterfly" biker coat Kyoko once owned) and Saki, although they discover Tohru's grandfather visited before them. Yuki notices that despite the deaths of her parents, Tohru still manages to smile. Saki meanwhile talks to Kyo and he is shocked when she tells him his thoughts are filled with regret and "chaos". As the sun sets, Yuki notices and seems to recognize the baseball cap in Tohru's room, while Kyo gets closer to a sleeping Tohru and whispers "I'm sorry".
15	"I Wouldn't Say That"; Transliteration: "Sōde mo nai sa" (Japanese: そうでもないさ)	July 13, 2019	September 25, 2020
Shigure brings Tohru, Yuki, Kyo and Hatori to the Sohmas' lakeside house for a short vacation. Though Hatori deduces that Shigure wants to tease his editor, it is revealed that Shigure wants Hatori to move on from Kana, whose wedding to another man happened very recently. Meanwhile Yuki and Kyo remain silent since visiting Kyoko's grave, causing Tohru to worry. Unable to handle the awkwardness any longer she apologizes to them but slips and causing the boys to turn into their respective animals. The boys reassure Tohru that they were preoccupied and not at all angry at her, though when they started arguing, Tohru is happy that they are back to normal. Ayame crashes the vacation the next day, and advises Hatori that he should not shoulder the burdens of his memories with Kana alone and be left behind while she moves on happily with her life. Moreover, Hatori should also move on with his own life. The episode ends with Tohru's homeroom teacher, Mayuko Shiraki, gazing at the photo of herself and Kana at the wedding.
16	"She Said Don't Step on Them!"; Transliteration: "Fumu nattsu tte ndaroga!" (Japanese: 踏むなっつってんだろが！)	July 20, 2019	October 2, 2020
Exasperated that Tohru is still using her school swimsuit at the pool, Arisa and Saki decide to buy a new swimsuit for her. Yuki and Kyo are forced to come along but their input was made moot when the girls decided to get a pink swimsuit. While having soba for lunch, Arisa recalls how she first met Tohru in middle school. Back when she was still in a violent street gang, her idol was the Crimson Butterfly who had since become a mother and had a daughter who goes to the same school as Arisa. However she was shocked that the Butterfly's daughter turned out to be a plain, strange, spaced out girl, and Kyoko (the Crimson Butterfly) became a doting parent. It is at their home that Tohru first calls Arisa "Uo-chan" after Kyoko first suggested it. The love displayed between Tohru and Kyoko leads Arisa to be reminded of the neglect from her single father, and she rejected them both. The meeting and her past circumstances causes Arisa to break down as she realizes that she may become permanently stuck in her situation. In a post-credits scene, a group of female delinquents try to intimidate a passerby, but run away when Momiji begins speaking German to them.
17	"This is for Uo-chan!"; Transliteration: "Uo-chan no Bun de su~tsu!！" (Japanese: うおちゃんの分ですっ！)	July 27, 2019	October 9, 2020
Continuing from the previous episode, Tohru saves Arisa from getting beaten by her fellow gang members and takes her back to her house. Gradually embracing the loving environment that she has never had, Arisa starts to spend more time with Tohru and Kyoko. Others around them, however, constantly think that Arisa is bullying Tohru due to their contrasting personalities. One night, however, Arisa decides to quit the gang, and is saved from nearly being killed by Kyoko, who rescues her at Akimoto's (the lone gang member sympathetic to Arisa) request. Kyoko then explains her theory of life that there are feelings that she does not understand until she gets hurt and makes trouble, and when she hits rock bottom, then she will understand, and finally, she needs gentleness to feel the pain and not let this be for nothing. Arisa emotionally declares that she wants to become Tohru's best friend. From that point on, Arisa and Tohru become best friends, eventually reaching 8th grade and befriending Saki, hanging out with each other before Kyoko's untimely death. Back to the present, a group of female delinquents attempt to threaten Arisa and pick a fight with her, but Arisa then teaches one of those delinquents that there are other ways to show off. As the sun sets, even though Kyoko died, her words, feelings, and Tohru herself have nourished Arisa to grow. The episode ends with Arisa happily cooking food and scolding her father for drinking more alcohol, contrasting their non-existent relationship prior to meeting Tohru. In a post-credits scene, two of the female delinquents tried to imitate Arisa with a new appreciation of her, much to the third delinquent's discomfort.
18	"What's Important Is..."; Transliteration: "Taisetsuna no Wa......" (Japanese: 大切なのは......)	August 3, 2019	October 16, 2020
Hatsuharu brings over an exhausted Kisa Sohma, who is the Tiger of the Zodiac, to Shigure's home. He reveals how Kisa ran away from home after being constantly bullied at school and has since been unable to speak. After biting him, she runs off, prompting Tohru to follow her. Kisa's situation also forcefully reminds Yuki of his own earlier suffering from Akito. Tohru soon finds Kisa and meets her mother. With Yuki eavesdropping out of sight, Tohru tells of her own experiences of being bullied and unable to tell anyone but felt relief when Kyoko found out and comforted Tohru. Kisa is moved by this and embraces Tohru after transforming back into a young girl. To allow time for both mother and daughter to heal, Kisa stays at Shigure's house for three days, never leaving Tohru's side but still mute. At school, Momiji believes that Kisa's bullying is due to her physical appearance as an effect of the Sohma curse. That afternoon after school, Hatsuharu brings a note from Kisa's homeroom teacher, stating that she needs to find the good in herself in order to recover and move on. Yuki disagrees, believing that one can recover only when someone else accepts them for who they are, referring to Tohru's acceptance of him. Kisa finally speaks in agreement, and resolves to better herself by returning to school. Yuki also resolves to move forward; unwilling to consider the offer earlier, he now accepts becoming the next student council president.
19	"I'm So Sorry!"; Transliteration: "Gomen'nasai" (Japanese: ごめんなさいーっ)	August 10, 2019	N/A
While returning to Shigure's house, Tohru meets Ritsu Sohma, the Monkey of the Zodiac and the hostess' child. However, Ritsu panics easily whenever anything goes wrong and is apologetic. Shigure wants Ritsu to have some confidence and talk without panicking, though it didn't work when Yuki and Kyo returned, and when Tohru accidentally embraces Ritsu, she was shocked that Ritsu is a boy instead of a girl due to wearing a kimono. Ritsu then explains that ever since he wore Kagura's dress in the past, wearing girl's clothes makes him feel calmer. Then, Mitsuru rushes to Shigure's house for his manuscript, even after Shigure tricked her into going to a sushi restaurant. He then secretly tricks Ritsu into sending Mitsuru away, though Ritsu believes that she is a stalker to Shigure. But, when he sees her making a suicide note for not getting the manuscript from Shigure, Ritsu is starting to feel bad for her. Soon after, though, Shigure finally gives his manuscript to Mitsuru. The manuscript that was already done, however, is ruined when Ritsu accidentally spills a cup of coffee on it, forcing Mitsuru to pass out and he ran away to the rooftop. Believing that he caused trouble for the last time, Ritsu was about to commit suicide to avoid making further mistakes, especially when he remembers that his parents were apologizing because of his clumsiness. However, Tohru stops Ritsu and encourages him that even though no one is born with a reason to be alive, he can just find a reason to live, like the time Tohru found her reason to live, to become someone who can live for the sake of the others, and that he might meet with someone who wants to be with him. Feeling touched by her words, Ritsu agrees with her and he should live for someone else's sake. Later that night, after buying takoyaki while Shigure re-finishes his manuscript, Ritsu relates to Mitsuru about causing trouble for others and not having a reason to live, but after hearing his words about finding a reason to live for someone else, Mitsuru felt that she can keep going. Soon after, Ritsu and Mitsuru became friends, though they both still panic easily and they both apologized to each other.
20	"I Can't Believe You Picked It Up"; Transliteration: "Nani majide hirotte'n no Sa" (Japanese: 何マジで拾ってんのさ)	August 17, 2019	October 23, 2020
When Kisa begins spending more time with Tohru, a young jealous boy, Hiro Sohma, meets Tohru in person. He immediately belittles the older girl and takes Tohru's notebook, which contains the photo of Kyoko. With the help of Kyo, Momiji, and Kisa, Hiro gives back Tohru's notebook. As punishment, Tohru hugs the boy, which turns him into a sheep. Despite his dislike and jealously of Tohru, Hiro still brings Kisa to Shigure's house to watch an anime show. Hiro then demands Tohru to take him and Kisa out somewhere. At the park, it is revealed that some time prior, Hiro had admitted his love for Kisa to Akito, who later physically harmed the young girl resulting in her hospitalization. Hearing of this, Hiro subsequently began to ignore Kisa to prevent any further harm coming to her. Kisa's bullying occurred soon after, and Hiro was unable to help after ignoring her so suddenly. Thus Hiro became angry at himself and took that anger out on Tohru, who was able to help Kisa recover. Tohru, however, comforts him that it takes courage to admit that he is still a kid but he should be able to protect Kisa in the future.
21	"I Never Back Down from a Wave Fight"; Transliteration: "Ura reta denpa wa kawanakucha" (Japanese: 売られた電波は買わなくちゃ)	August 24, 2019	October 30, 2020
Motoko Minagawa and two members of the "Prince Yuki" fan club come up with an elaborate plan to rid Yuki of Tohru by finding out the weakness of "demon queen" Saki. Saki invites them over to her house after school so the trio can search for her weakness under the pretense of asking her about her waves ability. Surprised at how normal Saki's place is despite her personality, the trio begin searching for clues in her room, but discover Megumi Hanajima, Saki's younger brother, hiding behind a closet. The awkward tension between the group is broken when Saki deduces their real reason for coming, and she and Megumi call out their actions in spite of their jealousy of Tohru's closeness with Yuki. The trio run off after Megumi recites their names (having been warned by Saki earlier to not say their names so carelessly should they wish to be cursed). Saki does admit to being a little jealous that Tohru is spending more time with the Sohmas, but is happily reassured when Arisa and Tohru drop by on her place out of concern for her. The next morning, Motoko and the two girls, having had the same nightmare about Saki and Megumi, are further teased when Saki states the curse will take effect after three days.
22	"Because I Was Happy"; Transliteration: "Datte ureshikatta no Yo" (Japanese: だって嬉しかったのよ)	August 31, 2019	November 6, 2020
The episode recounts Saki's backstory prior to the start of the series. Born with powers that other people will never understand, she was bullied at elementary school by boys who claimed that she is a witch. This culminated into an incident when one of the bullies was knocked unconscious and nearly died after Saki was thrown onto the classroom floor. Since then, the other kids began to prejudice her, accusing her of being the perpetrator when one kid got injured. Her brother Megumi comforts her and prays for someone to end her suffering. The situation did not improve even after a few years when some girls burned Saki's arm and framed her for playing with matches, while she desperately tries to avoid repeating the incident. Saki was later transferred to a new high school out of her parents' concern for her well-being. She meets Tohru and Arisa during lunchtime, but unlike the others, Tohru and Arisa are being friendly to her, so she steadily begins to hang out with them. Two seasons pass when two girls ask Saki about the earlier incidents. The memories cause Saki to use her powers on them and runs off. But Tohru caught up to her and consoles Saki to not distance herself, while Arisa tells her to not assume things. Saki emotionally became firm friends with Tohru and Arisa as a result. After some time has passed, Saki can no longer hear the voices in her head, although she can still use her waves to "chastise" people a bit. As the sun sets, Kyoko explains that people cannot live without others and that no matter what happens, she wants to be accepted by them, and even if Saki, Tohru, and Arisa go to their separate ways, some part of the relationship will always stay with her.
23	"You Look Well..."; Transliteration: "Genki-sōda na......" (Japanese: 元気そうだな......)	September 7, 2019	November 13, 2020
Tohru is devastated that she failed the final exam, but Yuki, Arisa, and Saki cheered her up when they tell her that she can pass the make-up exam. But while walking home with Kyo, Tohru suddenly caught a fever and fell to the ground. Shigure suggested that she should stay home and rest until she gets better, as he calls Momiji to remind him that she is sick and can't work. Kyo makes some dinner for Tohru to eat, but when he sees her crying about not doing anything better, he tells her that she needs to get better soon, with his own way of saying it. Tohru smiled as she eats the dinner that he made. Hatori, Momiji, and Kisa then visit Tohru, and after Hatori injects Tohru with the medicine, Yuki handed her the notebook with the notes for her to study for the make-up exam. After Tohru passed the make-up exam and walking home with Kyo and Yuki, they met Kagura again, even though Kyo tried to run away from her again. Shigure forced Kyo to go shopping with Kagura. While on a "date", Kagura asked Kyo about hiding his "true form" from Tohru, but then he shuts her mouth for mentioning it. But then, after getting back home, Kyo suddenly met someone familiar to him in the front door.
24	"Let's Go Home"; Transliteration: "Kaerimashō" (Japanese: 帰りましょう)	September 14, 2019	November 20, 2020
Kyo's foster father Kazuma Sohma visits Shigure's house to see Kyo. Overjoyed at his return, Kyo reminds Kazuma of his promise that he can return to the dojo. Kazuma however believes that it would be beneficial for Kyo to continue living at Shigure's house because of Tohru's positive influence. He thus confides in Shigure his plan to confront Kyo and expose his true cat form in the belief that Tohru will save him, which Kagura overhears. That night Kazuma removes the rosary from Kyo's wrist and exposes his true form in front of Tohru, with Kagura and Yuki watching from behind the scenes. Frightened of ultimately losing her, he runs away from the house but Tohru follows him. She catches up to him but Kyo turns her away. Although initially repulsed at the sight, Tohru does not back away but instead clings to Kyo and vows to never leave his side. The embrace reminds Kyo of his mother before her death, and briefly turns back to normal before transforming into the cat, as Tohru carries him back to the house.
25	"Summer Will Be Here Soon"; Transliteration: "Mōsugu natsu ga yattekimasu" (Japanese: もうすぐ夏がやってきます)	September 21, 2019	November 27, 2020
Kazuma leaves the house with Tohru without saying his goodbyes to Kyo. He confesses to her that he took Kyo in as atonement for the horrible things he said in his only meeting with his grandfather, Kyo's predecessor as the Cat spirit. Before long however, Kazuma grew to love Kyo as his son. Kyo manages to catch up to the pair, and apologizes for being a burden to Kazuma. Now knowing each other's feelings, Kyo and Kazuma firmly reconcile their relationship as Kyo vows to become stronger. Meanwhile Kagura leaves early while Yuki himself is unsure of his feelings. This attracts Hatsuharu's attention and brings it up with Tohru, who is also worried about Yuki. Hatsuharu later tells Yuki that it is alright to stay silent on his feelings but he should not make Tohru worry. Yuki soon reassures her that he strives to better himself gradually. After school, most of the Zodiac members are invited to dinner at Shigure's house. The episode ends with Hiro visiting Rin at the hospital, and Shigure himself at Akito's side, sensing that change is coming and the family curse might finally break.

=== Season 2 (2020) ===
No. overall	No. in season	Title	Original release date
26	1	"Hello Again"; Transliteration: "Ohisashiburidesu" (Japanese: お久しぶりです)	March 30, 2020 (theater; canceled); April 7, 2020
Motoko Minagawa looks through a window down at Yuki as she confesses her love for him and dislike at Tohru for getting close to him and changing him as she wishes she was the one by his side. Tohru recaps the first season to explain her current circumstances and it is revealed it has been almost a full year since she started living with Shigure and the others. She confesses that she hopes to help and uncover the true nature of the curse. Tohru and Shigure are all talking of summer break as Yuki leaves early for his new student council duties. Yuki's fan club storms into the President's office to find out the names of the other students on the student council board, mostly to see if there's any girls. Yuki meets Machi and Manabe as he enters the meeting room which appears to be a mess with papers and files scattered around. Manabe introduces himself as the Vice President and Machi as treasurer before he drags Yuki as he departs. Manabe makes a rude remark and Yuki realizes he's being made fun of, something that never happens to him. Motoko remembers when she first met Yuki a year ago and how she's doted on him and fell in love since then. She and Rika Aida devise a plan to break into the Student Council Room and find to their surprise that it's unlocked and Yuki is in there alone. Yuki and Tohru are washing dishes as he shares what he's learned from his encounters with the board members and his senpais.
27	2	"Eat Somen With Your Friends"; Transliteration: "Min'na de sōmen tabe tari shite ne" (Japanese: みんなで素麺食べたりしてね)	March 30, 2020 (theater; canceled); April 14, 2020
The school students are reminded to submit their career plans and that there will be a parent teacher meeting after the summer breaks. Saki, Arisa, Yuki, Kyo and Tohru all decide to have lunch together on the school ground, when Arisa suggests to Tohru could marry either Yuki or Kyo instead of starting a career plan. The next day, Tohru and Kyo are invited for lunch at Kyo's master Kazuma's house, when suddenly Kazuma gets a call from Kyo's father. Kazuma informs the pair that he needs to go out urgently and will be back soon. He meets with Kyo's father who is disgusted by Kyo since he is possessed by the Cat zodiac. Kyo's father suggests that Kyo be put away in a pitch-black room as the cursed cat deserves, though Kazuma stands up for Kyo, claiming that the boy is changing for the better and that he will protect him at all costs. While leaving from work, Momiji tells Tohru he has decided his career but he may face some difficulty and it may not be possible. Yuki comes to pick up Tohru from work where they talk about their career plans as well. When Tohru gets home, she goes to the kitchen and finds Kyo making a late somen snack. The two have a deep conversation about the future where Kyo expresses that as the cat of the zodiac, the Sohma family may not approve of him to take up Kazuma's dojo or any other job, as well as that Tohru's focus should be on her own future since her mother died. Upon this, Tohru starts to cry, realizes that she actually worried about getting a job and making it on her own in the future, but pretends that everything is okay so that she doesn't have to deal with such feelings. Shigure pops in and advises she focus on the present, as the future will eventually arrive in time. Tohru invites Yuki to come enjoy the snacks so that they can enjoy it as a family.
28	3	"Shall We Go and Get You Changed?"; Transliteration: "O kigae shimashō ka.....❤" (Japanese: お着替えしましょうか・・・・・❤)	March 30, 2020 (theater; canceled); April 21, 2020
Yuki wakes from a dream that has his mother telling him that he is just a tool to be used. When Ayame visits Shigure's house, Yuki makes a surprise announcement to visit his shop as a way to get to know his brother better. On a Sunday, he and Tohru come to Ayame's shop which turns out to be a clothes shop that caters to the fantasies of men. His assistant Mina Kurume takes Tohru away to dress her upon a costume but also to give the brothers some private time. Ayame brings up the upcoming parent-teacher conference and offers to accompany Yuki, though the latter wants to bring their parents despite not having been in contact for a long time. Privately noting that he also acted indifferently towards Yuki so that he could live freely, Ayame advises that regardless of what their parents think, Yuki should follow his own feelings, that he is not a tool for others and that he is not alone to help him, using his shop and Mina as examples. Both brothers though acknowledge the need to accept their differences and move on from them, something that Yuki confesses to Tohru when she returns in a cute dress outfit.
29	4	"I Got Dumped..."; Transliteration: "Fura reta nda~a....." (Japanese: ふられたんだぁ・・・・・)	April 28, 2020
During a hospital visit, Hatsuharu gets dumped by Isuzu "Rin" Sohma. Shocked, he becomes moody until eventually snapping and "Dark Haru" trashes the classroom. At Momiji's plea for help, Yuki, Kyo and Tohru rush to the scene. Each tries to calm Hatsuharu, though when Kyo and Haru nearly come to blows, their homeroom teacher Shiraki pours cold water on them. After cooling down, Hatsuharu is temporarily suspended from school and tells Yuki that Rin dumped him but not explaining the reason for it. During his suspension, Yuki resolves to return to the Sohma estate to visit Hatsuharu with great courage though he thinks he sees Rin as well in spite of supposing to be at the hospital. Hatsuharu tells Yuki that despite the situation, he will never stop loving Rin. Yuki leaves the estate satisfied with his decision, while Rin looks on from behind.
30	5	"Wait for Me, Tororo Soba!"; Transliteration: "Mattero Tororo Sobā!" (Japanese: 待ってろとろろソバー！)	May 5, 2020
With the start of the summer break, Tohru and the Sohma boys head to the department store for shopping and to check out a new attraction at Momiji's behest. It turns out to be a haunted house, though Tohru is the only one to be terrified at all the contraptions. Meanwhile Arisa meets up with Kureno Sohma by coincidence, the pair having previously met once before at the convenience store she works at. They head to a diner for some tororo soba to catch up, though Arisa's feelings for Kureno become twisted when he remarks their first meeting happened only because he was in the area unnecessarily. She loses her temper and storms out though Kureno catches up to her and quickly apologies. He leans in as if to embrace her, before leaving her hanging. Stumped and confused, Arisa confides to Saki that she will not chase after him and let him come to her. Kureno meanwhile regrets that he may have to forget about Arisa as he arrives in Akito's room.
31	6	"Are You Really This Stupid?"; Transliteration: "Baka kai? Kimi wa" (Japanese: 馬鹿かい？君は)	May 12, 2020
Momiji invites Tohru to a summer getaway along with most of the Sohmas. While initially excited, she forgot to complete her homework, but Yuki helped her finish the work. The next day, Momiji, Kyo, Yuki, and Tohru leave for the getaway but Shigure stays behind. In that moment, Rin shows up and presumably seduces him. At the beach, Hiro, Kisa, and Hatsuharu join up with Tohru and the others. Yuki briefly thinks about Akito's trauma and gets sullen, but Hatsuharu calms him down. After the time at the beach, Hiro asks Tohru why she always talks about her mother. Before she could answer, she is called away by Momiji. Noticing Tohru's discomfort, Kisa berates Hiro for assuming that Tohru was okay with his question before running to her. Hiro feels guilty about Tohru and Kisa, and attempts to empathize with the former's feelings. At night, Kisa apologizes to Hiro for berating him and Hiro apologizes for not understanding Tohru and Kisa's feelings. Meanwhile, Tohru thinks back to Hiro's question and briefly has a breakdown before calming down. The next day, Hiro notices that Tohru seems more cheerful but Kyo lets him know that she is still a bit down. Shigure and Akito have a conversation how the summer getaway is bothering the latter and wants to teach the kids a lessons, while the former supports the idea. That same night, Yuki lets Tohru know that someday he'll tell her the truth about his pent up feelings of Akito's trauma and the fact that he was the boy whose cap Tohru had kept for so long.
32	7	"Let the Watermelon Splitting Contest Begin!"; Transliteration: "Suika-wari taikai o hajimeru no Yō" (Japanese: スイカ割りコンテストを始めましょう！)	May 19, 2020
Yuki thinks about how Tohru made his life better with the trauma he went -- and continues to go -- through. Shigure shows up to the beach when Hiro notes that his mom is pregnant, with Kisa and Tohru giving congratulations. Excluding Shigure, the three of them join up with Momiji, Kyo, Yuki, and Hatsuharu for a watermelon splitting contest in honour of the eventual birth of Hiro's sibling. Most of the Zodiacs remark how parents embrace their children since they can't experience that. Tohru thinks back to Hiro's question and wonders if it's insensitive to talk about her mom since she doesn't know what their parents are like. After the contest, Yuki thinks back to Akito's mental torture and goes for a walk. Tohru and Kyo have a conversation about their parents, where it is revealed that his mom died in an accident when he was four or five years old. Kyo lets her know that she doesn't need to be considerate about their parents while talking about her mom. Hatori and Shigure meet up at the resort and talks about things getting twisted for the benefit of the latter, and notes that Akito came as well. While walking, Yuki coincidentally meets Akito. That evening, Shigure takes the Zodiacs to meet Akito, leaving Kyo and Tohru behind, while the Zodiacs worry about Tohru and returning as soon as possible. Hatori, Shigure, and Akito talk about Yuki's trauma and Akito's desire for Yuki to come back, then Akito leaves to meet the rest of the Zodiacs. The two men remarks Yuki's gradual change. Feeling impatient, Tohru leaves to the beach to wait for the Zodiacs to come back where she sees Yuki. He recounts his past and trauma because of Akito and thanks Tohru for saving him and for being someone dear to him.
33	8	"It's True, Isn't It?"; Transliteration: "Datte honto no Koto daro" (Japanese: だってホントのことだろ)	May 26, 2020
Rin leaves Kagura's house and tells her to stop pretending to love everyone. Kagura's mom talks about how Akito showed up at the resort and tells her to not go, in fear of Kagura's safety. Elsewhere, Tohru recounts last night where Yuki let out his feelings and what happened after the Zodiacs came back. The Zodiacs left to meet Akito again, but Hatori stays behind because he and most of the Zodiacs are worried about Tohru and vice versa, but reassures that she is fine as Hatori leaves. Yuki and Shigure briefly have a conversation about what Akito said to the former. Hatsuharu meets with Akito and talks about Tohru to meet Kureno, but Akito laughs at the idea. Tohru and Kyo are at the beach when the rest of the Zodiacs show up. Yuki lets her know that he'll tell her more of his pent up feelings some day, and warns Kyo to not lash out at Akito -- if he sees them someday. -- That same night, Rin arrives at the resort without anyone's knowledge. The next day, Akito and Kureno go out for a walk where the former discusses their disdain for Tohru and the long-term plan of getting the Zodiacs back and leaving Tohru lonely. Kyo and Tohru are back at the beach to kill time, and Kyo talks about the bracelet on his hand is made from the bones of a monk that was sacrificed. Feeling distraught, Tohru stops him from continuing on. Akito and Kureno watches them from afar, while Yuki watches all four of them from afar and notices Rin walking on the road. Later that same day, Tohru was doing laundry when a misplaced sheet lands near Rin, in her transformed form as the Horse spirit. Yuki shows up and notes that she may have transformed due to being unwell and Tohru suggests to bring Hatori over when Rin nearly kicks her at the suggestion. While Tohru goes to bring new clothes, Rin tells Yuki to not tell anyone that she came; when Tohru comes back, Rin leaves with Yuki leaving after to Akito's place. That evening, Rin takes out her anger at the beach, and Akito tells Hatori and Shigure to bring Kyo over tomorrow.
34	9	"So Precious..."; Transliteration: "Taisetsuna ore no....." (Japanese: 大切な俺の・・・・・)	June 2, 2020
Kyo is summoned to join Akito at the annex, and Tohru is ecstatic that he's being acknowledged. At the annex, Kyo notes that Tohru will be left alone and Yuki warns him to not lash out at Akito. The two nearly come to blows but Kyo stops himself and enters Akito's room. The two recount the time when they made a bet that Kyo must defeat Yuki before they graduate high school or else he'll be locked up for the rest of his life, such is the fate of the Cat spirit. Kyo retaliates and assures that he will beat Yuki, when Akito goes on a tirade of emotional blackmail: blaming Kyo for his mother's suicide and saying that everyone would have been happy if "the monster" didn't exist. Akito then wonders if Tohru is the reason that Kyo is able to rebel against Akito and calling her a "monster" like Kyo. Kyo remembers when Tohru accepted his true form and the fact that her existence brings joy for him and affirms his love for her. Noticing that Kyo is tearing up, Akito continues the emotional blackmail by talking down on Tohru and manipulates him into believing that he doesn't love Tohru. After Kyo leaves, Yuki and Akito talk about today with Kyo's affirmation that he doesn't love Tohru which Yuki believes is impossible. Kyo is in despair after recounting the events of his life and Akito's emotional blackmail, but slowly gains faith after remembering the times when Kazuma told him to stay strong as his hope will come one day and when Kyoko took care of him. Finally finding his hope in Tohru, Kyo wishes to stay by her side with the remaining time he has left and internally assures his love for her.
35	10	"Who Are You?"; Transliteration: "Anata wa....."dare" desu ka?" (Japanese: あなたは・・・・・『誰』ですか？)	June 9, 2020
Tohru and the kids decide to end their summer getaway with fireworks. She thinks about how everyone is gradually changing and overcoming the trauma caused by Akito. Momiji and Kyo have a discreet conversation about how everyone is trying to protect Tohru from Akito and how they want to make time for Tohru; Tohru thinks about wanting to do more just as everyone is doing for her. Elsewhere, Akito and Shigure talk about how Shigure was nicer to Akito in the past and wonders if Tohru is also influencing Shigure as well. Just then, Kureno lets Akito know of an emergency and the two prepare to leave, however Akito goes to the summer resort to talk to Tohru. Momiji tries to calm Akito down but ends up getting punched by Akito, where in that moment Tohru shows up to defend Momiji. Akito lets Tohru know that the Zodiacs will not be saved by Tohru and one day, they will return to the Sohma family and live forever in "an eternal banquet." Tohru retaliates by defying Akito's beliefs and understands that Akito isn't the Rooster but a being equal to God and "the ruler of the their souls." Akito scratches Tohru's face, when Kureno is introduced as the Rooster and has come to pick Akito up. Hatori and Shigure tend to Momiji's and Tohru's injuries while Hatsuharu, Yuki, and Kyo witnessed everything that happened. The next evening, the kids go down to the beach for lighting fireworks while Rin watches them from afar. The kids end their summer getaway with fireworks, and Tohru internally resolves to protect the Zodiacs from Akito and eventually break the curse.
36	11	"All Mine"; Transliteration: "Watashi dake no Monoda yo" (Japanese: 私だけのものだよ)	June 16, 2020
Kagura decides to confess her love for Kyo and why she fell in love. Back from the summer getaway, Tohru, Kyo, Yuki, and Shigure return to find Ayame at their house. While the men joke around, Tohru goes to make a call to Kazuma and asks to see him. There, Kazuma states that he went to pay respects to his grandfather's grave but was not in the Sohma family cemetery, given that his grandfather was shunned for harboring the spirit of the cat. Tohru inquires to Kazuma more of the Zodiac curse and requests his help in breaking it. He lets her know that the Zodiacs sees Akito as a God and the curse is essentially the bond of family (a bond in blood.) While neither of them can do much, the best thing that Tohru can do is give the Zodiacs hope that one day, they'll create new bonds. Kagura and Kyo meet up and both have something important to say so decide to go on a date, at Kagura's behest. As Tohru leaves Kazuma's dojo, she bumps into Rin where the latter tells her to stop her association with the Sohmas. That night, Kyo lets Shigure and Yuki know that he's going out with Kagura. On the day of, Kagura notices Kyo's gradual emotional maturity and recalls the time when she met Kyo, alone in a playground. In the present, they end up going to the same playground when Kagura recounts the time she saw Kyo's true form. Kagura finally confesses that she has always looked down on Kyo because of the social differences as a result of their Zodiac spirits, but does feel guilty that she reacted the same way that everyone else had and wishes for a do-over, which eventually spurred her love in order to negate that guilt. She apologises for being selfish. Kyo confesses that he will never love her and saw her as a sister and thanks Kagura for associating with him when no one else would, giving the two closure.
37	12	"You Cried for Me"; Transliteration: "Ore no Kawarini kimi ga naita" (Japanese: 俺の代わりに君が泣いた)	June 23, 2020
Mayuko Shiraki thinks about the time when Hatori and Kana were happy. Just then, Shigure shows up to her bookstore for a book, by whom was Mayuko's fling. Mayuko continues reminiscing about when she met Hatori through Kana and unknowingly caught feelings for him. Slowly, her love for Hatori grew deeper which made her feel guilty for Kana. Through Hatori, Mayuko met Shigure and Ayame, where one day she decides to go out with Shigure to alleviate the loneliness of not having a boyfriend. However, Mayuko and Shigure were essentially in a loveless relationship, just acknowledging each other's existence. Things took a turn for the worse when Kana eventually became mentally ill after the incident with Akito. Later that year, Kana completely forgot about her relationship with Hatori and Mayuko broke up with Shigure, when Kana suggests to get with Hatori which Mayuko ends up tearing since she wanted Kana to be happy with Hatori. In the present, Shigure lies to Mayuko about the fact that Hatori has a girlfriend which Mayuko ends up believing. He leaves, when Hatori shows to pick up the same book as Shigure (which Mayuko believes was a ploy to set her and Hatori up); the two have a brief conversation before he leaves. The next day, Hatori shows up to pick up the book but Mayuko takes him far from the store (out of embarrassment of her mom.) The two talk about Hatori's emotional barrier, where he notes that he doesn't deserve happiness; upon hearing that, Mayuko bawls her eyes out and Hatori calms her down, relieving both of them and dispelling the fact that he has a girlfriend. Now free from her lonesomeness, Mayuko hopes to bring happiness to herself and Hatori.
38	13	"Sure Thing"; Transliteration: "Īssuyo" (Japanese: いいっスよー)	June 30, 2020
The new term begins with Arisa and Kyo measuring their heights and Saki recounting that Arisa never saw Kureno again. Motoko and the Prince Yuki fanclub members asks Yuki about his summer when an overly friendly girl drags him away, to the shock of Motoko. Kakeru shows up, where he introduces that girl -- whose name is Kimi Todo -- and Naohito Sakuragi as new members of the student council. After giving a speech to his new council, Yuki expresses his impressions on the new council, and goes around helping fellow students. Given that his and Kakeru's personalities contrast, Yuki believes that he must do a good job in order to have a better personality. The next day, the student council acquires a new whiteboard on the back of Kimi's presumable seduction, and they decide to assign each other colors which ends up failing. At the end of the day, Yuki helps out a school club when Kakeru catches up with him and asks if Yuki likes Tohru when Yuki loses it and the boys yell at each other; when Yuki realizes that he is being arrogant and pretends to know everyone's feelings, Kakeru and Yuki make up, saying they are jealous of the other, and attempts to empathize with themselves and the students better. Yuki remarks how he will understand others to slowly breaking out of his shell.
39	14	"I Might as Well Die, Then..."; Transliteration: "Ore mō shin datte ī ya....." (Japanese: 俺もう死んだっていいや・・・・・)	July 7, 2020
Yuki thinks about his initial memories about Rin. Tohru receives a call that her grandfather gets injured and cannot take her to parent-teacher conference when Shigure decides to attend with her. Yuki thinks about asking his parents for the conference and clearing everything up. The next day, Hatsuharu and Yuki discuss about the former's breakup with Rin as Hatsuharu decides what to do next to get over it. Later that day, Yuki returns to the Sohma estate to tell his mother about the conference; as he leaves, he runs into Kagura and asks for Rin. Yuki then talks about if anything happened between Kagura and Kyo, given the fact that Kyo has been sullen after the confession; Kagura simply answers that she'll get over it in time, which makes Yuki jealous of Kyo for liking someone. After the talk with Kagura, Yuki runs into Rin, asking her if she was serious with the breakup. Rin tells Yuki to stop being ignorant and be aware of how he was able to get away from Akito, where in that moment, Hatsuharu shows up to passionately kiss Rin. After the kiss, Hatsuharu tries to calm down Rin and remember the happier times before she slaps him and runs away. The boys talk about overcoming their struggles and supporting each other along the way. Tohru goes to her grandfather's to check up, when he talks about wanting to see Kyoko and Katsuya one more time. On the way home, Tohru has an emotional breakdown about her parents and grandfather, when Kyo manages to calm her down and the two go home. Hatsuharu is at Shigure's, and asks him if Rin ever came there; Shigure brushes off the question and instead asks Hatsuharu to ask her himself, while also telling the young ones to keep overcoming their struggles.
40	15	"See You Later"; Transliteration: ".....Ittekimasu" (Japanese: ・・・・・行ってきます)	July 14, 2020
Parent-teacher conferences to discuss career plans are underway, beginning with Arisa wanting to become a model and Saki to just graduate. Shigure shows up with Tohru, where the latter talks about her future plans to work straight after graduating; Mayuko tells her to let loose since Tohru has time to decide. After Tohru is excused, Shigure and Mayuko have a discussion on his twisted personality and how he should be nicer to others. Tohru is once again having inner thoughts about her parents, when Arisa and Saki manages to calm her down and tells her to focus on the present. Kazuma tells Kyo that he still has time to decide on his future, which Kyo has decided on staying at Tohru's side before graduating but does not let anyone else know. Yuki's mother shows up to the conference, where he is being emotionally held hostage by her: never paying attention to him, making decisions for him, and disregarding Akito's influence over Yuki. Ayame arrives to defuse the situation and telling off his mother to understand Yuki more, where then she leaves. Yuki chases after her and states that he wants independence from her but still cares for her, in spite of everything happening. Yuki gives silent thanks to Tohru for his gradual independence from his mother and Akito.
41	16	"Ask Him For Me"; Transliteration: "Dakara tsutaete" (Japanese: だからつたえて)	July 21, 2020
Tohru takes it upon herself to venture into the Sohma Estate to meet Kureno, after Arisa is stuck up on him ever since their encounter. The night before, Tohru asks Kyo about Kureno, but gets no information since Kureno doesn't associate with any of the Zodiacs. Returning to the present, Tohru hears a violin in the distance, and then bumps into Momo, Momiji's younger sister; Momo leads Tohru to Momiji who's playing the violin. Given that Momo isn't aware that Momiji is her brother, she asks Tohru to relay a wish to Momiji. After Momo leaves, Tohru goes to Momiji's and appears very sullen. Momiji reveals that he quit his violin lessons because Momo wanted to learn from Momiji's teacher, therefore their dad made him quit in order to preserve the façade. Tohru tearfully admits that Momo has been watching him this whole time and relays Momo's wish: ask Momiji to be her brother, and Momiji admits that he wants to become a violinist to make his family listen. Tohru tells Momiji the reason she came, and he offers to take her to Kureno's -- in case Akito catches her -- but Tohru declines the offer. After several circumstances, Tohru finally finds Kureno; she tells him about how Arisa is stuck up on him and gives him Arisa's contact in case he wants to contact her. After that, she returns to Momiji's who offers to play a concert for her someday and relays a song for him to play, then goes home. That same night, Tohru spends time with Kyo and tears up that she wants hers and everyones wishes fulfilled someday.
42	17	"You Will, I'm Sure"; Transliteration: "Arimasu, kitto....." (Japanese: あります、きっと・・・・・)	July 28, 2020
Tohru and her classmates are in Kyoto for their school trip. Before the trip, Kyo and Tohru nearly forgot about the trip, and Shigure jokes about how the trip is a perfect opportunity for students to start relationships. In the present: Tohru hasn't told Arisa about Kureno yet, Kinoshita and the Prince Yuki fan club members are watching over him, and Kyo is getting asked out. Arisa, Saki, and two of their classmates watch the rejection happen and then catches up with Yuki and Tohru. After some time, Tohru spends time with Kyo and believes that she's slowly falling in love with Kyo. The next day, Tohru and the others continue their trip, with Tohru buying Zodiac figurines as souvenirs; Yuki gives silent thanks to Tohru for staying by his side in spite of everything happening. After spending time with Kakeru and Kimi, Yuki thinks about the value of having memories with his friends. After the trip, Yuki gives Machi a maple leaf as a souvenir, and Tohru shows Kyo the souvenirs and makes the Cat figurine in honour of him.
43	18	"Wanna Kiss?"; Transliteration: "Kisu shiyokka" (Japanese: キスしよっか)	August 4, 2020
Hiro, Kisa, and Hiro's mother discusses the eventual birth of Hiro's sibling, when in that moment Hiro sees Rin. He asks about Rin's wellbeing, but she tells off Hiro; after she leaves, Hiro believes that Rin is trying a way to break the Zodiac curse. She looks back at the time she went to Shigure's for his knowledge in breaking the curse, going as far as offering herself to him. He tells her to stop thinking highly of him, as he manipulates others for his benefit. Rin goes to find more evidence and starts to feel sick, eventually passes out. During that time, she thinks about her love for Hatsuharu and breaking the curse for his sake. After waking up, she's in a delirious state as she sees Akito embracing Hatsuharu; she goes to Shigure's for more information, where she suffers a panic attack and passes out. As a child, Rin was loved by her parents, but when she asked if they were truly happy, they neglected her and abused her. One day, she collapses and Hatsuharu and Kazuma come to her aid by taking her to the hospital; there, her parents essentially disown her but Hatsuharu defends her, eventually establishing their relationship. However, when Akito finds out about it, Rin claims full responsibility to protect Hatsuharu, and to punish her Akito pushes Rin out a balcony, with Hiro watching in terror. In the present, Tohru is taking care of the passed out Rin.
44	19	"There's Just No Way!"; Transliteration: "Nainda, doko ni mo!" (Japanese: 無いんだ、どこにもっ！)	August 11, 2020
Rin wakes up and Tohru gets Hatori to check up on her. However, when Hatori suggested to go back to the hospital, Rin nearly jumps out a window, only stopped when she regained control of her emotions. Hatori and Shigure have a discussion about how Rin came for information on breaking the Zodiac curse and if there's a way to actually break it. Yuki lets Rin know that Hatsuharu still loves her a lot; Rin recalls how Hatsuharu praised Tohru for being a kind girl. Rin declares there is no way to break it. She breaks down since she wants a motherlike kindness from Tohru and is scared of being independent, and the girls calm each other down. Hatsuharu checks up on Rin and is glad she's doing better; Kimi and Kakeru broadcast a student council meeting to Yuki over the PA, with the latter finding him. Back at home, Yuki briefly discusses about the upcoming school festival; Tohru made fruit jelly for everyone in honor of Rin. Tohru recalls how pained Rin was after carrying the weight of her emotions, trauma, and desire. The next day, Tohru visits Rin at the hospital and the two discuss how the curse works; when Rin asks why Tohru wants to break the curse, Tohru struggled to answer but Rin establishes their friendship. Later that night, Tohru has a nightmare of the morning of her mother's accident, and Rin wishes for Tohru to find someone to love her and save her from the eventual despair, just like how Hatsuharu did for Rin.
45	20	"Are You Okay?"; Transliteration: "Daijōbu desu ka" (Japanese: 大丈夫ですか)	August 18, 2020
Tohru's class is performing Cinderella for the school festival. Kakeru and Yuki discuss their relationships with their parents and are going to the student council meeting. However, Machi trashed the student council room and is in a state of shock; Kakeru convinces Yuki, Naohito, and Kimi to care of the mess and Machi. Meanwhile, Yuki thinks about what Kakeru's relationship with Machi is and why she messed up the room. After the meeting, Kakeru and Yuki discuss about Machi, who is Kakeru's younger half-sister: it is revealed that their father had an affair with Kakeru's mother, while being married to Machi's mother. The mothers had a severe feud about which child should be the successor of the family; eventually Kakeru gained independence, prompting his mother to terminate his successorship, but realizes that Machi hasn't gained independence yet. That afternoon, Yuki goes to his mother for a new cellphone and is shocked when his mother expressed parent-like concern for the first time. The next day, the student council discuss about the upcoming school festival, and Yuki attempts to understand Machi's destruction. The roles of Cinderella have been chosen: Saki as Cinderella, Kyo as the Prince, Minami and Tohru as the evil stepmother and stepsister respectively, and Yuki as the Fairy Godmother. Afterwards, Yuki returns to the student council room; he ends up getting locked from the inside in a closet, and while in there he recalls his meeting with Akito at the summer resort. Machi eventually breaks down the closet door, and offers her his gratitude. Yuki tells Kakeru about some painful memories that were triggered while the former was locked in the closet.
46	21	"There Was, Definitely"; Transliteration: "Attanda. Tashika ni" (Japanese: あったんだ。確かに)	August 25, 2020
Yuki recalls his childhood life and the time he first met Akito. Yuki was completely isolated from the other Zodiacs and always stayed at Akito's side. One day, Akito changed: berating Yuki at every instance, and mentally degraded Yuki by calling him useless and worthless. He later meets Kyo, but the latter blames Yuki for everything in his life given the exclusion of the Cat spirit. Each day, Akito would mentally degrade Yuki until Yuki accepted his fate: that no one cares for him and everyone around him disregards the situation. One day during school, he finally makes some friends, however it wouldn't last long since one of his female friends accidentally bumped into him and transformed into a rat, thus they had their memories erased. When he was returning from school, Yuki tries to return Kyo his cap, but the latter no longer wanted it so Yuki kept it as his own. Thrown into despair from Akito's relentless emotional abuse and the ignorance of everyone around him, Yuki runs away from his home. It was that certain morning when Tohru got lost from her home, with Kyoko frantically looking for her; Yuki eventually leads Tohru back to her house and gives her the cap, feeling fulfilled that he was able to be useful. In the present, Yuki expresses his longing to be friends with Kyo, and also Yuki's gratitude for Tohru, treating him with utmost respect and whom he views as a mother.
47	22	"That Isn't What I Want!"; Transliteration: "Ore wa, Iya nanda!" (Japanese: 俺は、嫌なんだ!)	September 1, 2020
Yuki continues his gratitude for Tohru, how she made him feel a mother's love since he nor the younger Zodiacs never experienced that. He realized that he never viewed her as lover, although he tried to make it feel like that for his mental reassurance. He thought that it was wrong to view Tohru as a lover, and instead views her as a mother. Kakeru wonders if Yuki gave up on Tohru as a lover to Kyo; Yuki believes that Kyo and Tohru have every right to love each other, and instead Yuki wants to find his own purpose in life and move forward with the guidance and gratitude Tohru has given him. After discussing his thoughts with Kakeru, Yuki feels a lot better and affirms that someday he will tell Tohru about his feelings for her. That night, Tohru struggles to learn her lines for the play; Kyo is shocked when Yuki tells him that Tohru has the cap now. The next day at school, Tohru continues to struggle to learn the play but wants to persevere since Yuki arranged for Ayame and Mine to make the costumes for the play. However, the class decides to change up the play to fit the actors rather than the characters, with Tohru asking permission to change the Prince's role to fit Kyo more given that he ditched rehearsal. Yuki goes to look for Kyo and the two argue about how Yuki always lived a high life and never had to struggle; their conversation ends with Kyo walking away after remembering that having someone to hate gives him purpose. At the end of the day, Tohru gives Kyo the revised script; Kyo embraces Tohru much to her surprise, and the two go home to continue practice their lines.
48	23	"It's Cinderella-ish"; Transliteration: "Shinderera ppoi mono!" (Japanese: シンデレラっぽいもの！)	September 8, 2020
Tohru's class puts on an unconventional retelling of Cinderella at the festival. Cinderella (Saki) lives a decent life and loves her stepsister (Tohru) despite the former being tormented by her stepmother (Minami). Cinderella is to make the dresses for the Prince's ball in order for the stepmother to marry off her daughter; to force Cinderella, the stepmother separates the sisters for the time being. Now, Cinderella wonders what to do for the ball when the Fairy Godmother (Yuki) comes to assist her and grant her one wish; in that moment, the stepmother comes back to finds the finished dresses, on the back of the Godmother's help. The stepmother leaves with her daughter for the ball, with Cinderella following on with the help of the Fairy Godmother. At the ball, the sullen Prince (Kyo) rejects everyone including the stepsister, but his friend (Arisa) urges the Prince to talk to Cinderella; as the clock struck midnight, Cinderella simply gives the Prince the glass slipper before leaving. The Prince comes to Cinderella's to ask the sisters' hand in marriage, however Cinderella reveals that her wish is to open a yakiniku store with her sister, and thus the play ends. After the play, Saki introduces herself to Kazuma -- who came at Hatsuharu's behest, much to Kyo's chagrin -- with whom she is attracted to. Kyo wonders if Tohru likes him, evident by Tohru's out-of-character near-confession during the play. Tohru meets up with Kisa, Hiro, Hatsuharu, and Momiji; Tohru asks Momiji if he could give her and Kureno a copy of the recording of the play. Hatsuharu makes a joke that Hiro likes Rin, with Kisa taking it to heart. Elsewhere, Yuki sees his fan club picking on Machi; Kakeru stops him from interfering but Yuki convinces him and the former goes away. Machi says that Yuki seems very lonely even while surrounded by so many people; the altercation stops when Kakeru and Kimi announces a school photoshoot with Yuki. Tohru and Kyo think about their feelings for each other and vows that thinking such thoughts will jeopardize their friendship.
49	24	"Here You Are"; Transliteration: "Machi ga ita" (Japanese: 真知がいた)	September 15, 2020
Machi thinks about how Yuki is starting to acknowledge her existence when no one has. The student council decides to go to a restaurant to celebrate the efforts of their year; Yuki becomes more and more considerate of Machi, which she is surprised by. Back at her home, she receives a call from her mom, who berates Machi for being a dull person and how she hasn't changed; Machi herself thinks that, and falls asleep while thinking about how Yuki changed from being lonely to being more friendly. The next day, Machi continues to think of herself objectively: whether her existence has any meaning to anyone or to the world for that matter. She meets with Yuki, and the two discuss about the maple leaf he gave her, and how he's very happy that she kept it; Machi bashfully denies that she treasures the leaf, but is glad when Yuki remembers that she likes the colour red. Given that Shigure and Yuki are returning to the Sohma estate for the New Years banquet, Tohru is staying over at Kazuma's dojo along with Kyo and Rin. At the estate, Yuki talks about how he's no longer blaming others for his misfortunes and will change by understanding his faults; upon hearing that, Akito smashes a glass vase on Yuki's head and then leaves in a fit of rage. Hatori tends to Yuki's injury, when the latter apologizes for holding inner guilt for the fact that Hatori erased Yuki's friends' memories. Hatsuharu leaves the banquet to meet Rin at Kazuma's. Momiji discretely gives Kureno a recording of the class play. Tohru wishes for the curse to be broken and everyone to live happily.
50	25	"I'm Different Now"; Transliteration: ".....Ore wa mō, chigau nda" (Japanese: ・・・・・俺はもう、違うんだ)	September 22, 2020
Akito apologizes to Kureno for being cruel to him at times and asks Kureno if he will stay by Akito's side; Kureno affirms his loyalty. Meanwhile, Tohru recalls to when she and Rin briefly talked about Hatsuharu and his and Rin's relationship; Yuki drops by and tells Tohru as how he got injured and how he has gotten braver; Momiji tells Tohru that he gave Kureno the recording of the play, and the two pray that Arisa's feelings will reach Kureno. In the present, Hatori and Shigure discusses Akito's declining health; how Shigure was yelled at for not immediately consoling Akito after Yuki's defiance; the two speculate that Kureno may be free from the Zodiac curse. Kureno watches the recording while thinking about his feelings for Arisa and the time when Akito pleaded Kureno to stay. The next day, Kureno phones Shigure and asks for Tohru, and Shigure asks him if Kureno is freed from the curse. As soon as Tohru comes back from school, Shigure sends her to meet Kureno, under the pretext of an errand. While at the park, Tohru notices some sparrows and then sees Kureno. At the same time, Akito frantically searches for Kureno; Kureno hugs Tohru to confirm that he is freed from the curse. He continues talking about how the curse broke suddenly and how he finally felt human; he talks about how he really wants to see Arisa and says he loves her. Kureno recalls the day his curse broke: Akito had a breakdown as to how the curse broke so suddenly and pleads to Kureno to stay. Kureno swears that he will stay by Akito's side, and continued pretending that he was still a part of the Zodiac. In the present, Kureno thinks back to his conversation with Shigure earlier about whether he feels pity for Akito; Kureno affirms his loyalty and will never abandon Akito until the day he is no longer needed, and he finally reveals that Akito is a woman, much to Tohru's shock.

=== Season 3 (2021) ===
No. overall	No. in season	Title	Directed by	Written by	Original release date
51	1	"I'll Hold Another Banquet"; Transliteration: "Mata Utage o Hirakō" (Japanese: また宴を開こう)	Takatoshi Suzuki	Taku Kishimoto	April 6, 2021 (Note: This episode was pre screened on March 13, 2021, and aired on April 6, 2021, at 1:35 a.m. JST, 5 minutes after the original air time on TV Tokyo.)
Tohru is shocked that Akito is revealed to be a woman. Kureno states that Akito has been raised as a male since birth, as decreed by Akito's mother, Ren Sohma. Around the same time, Akito and Ren have a violent confrontation when Ren berates Akito for having bonds with the Zodiacs, noting them as fake. Ren retaliates by stating that her bond with Akito's father, Akira Sohma, was real; Akito remembers the time when Akira told her that she was born to be loved. Kureno talks about how when he was young, he, Shigure, Ayame, and Hatori all had the same dream about how the God of the Zodiac, rather Akito, told the four boys how they were going to see them soon, noting that their Zodiac spirits rejoiced and to never betray Akito; only those four are aware that Akito is a female. Kureno talks about how he can't abandon Akito due to her emotional volatility and feels guilty that he can't see Arisa while caring for another girl. Kureno leaves after he apologizes for burdening Tohru, as she is in a state of shock. Saki arrives at the park and takes Tohru to her home for the night. At Saki's home, Tohru breaks down about how she asked Kureno to see Arisa, and talks about Kureno's situation while berating herself for being unable to help others when others helped her. Saki listens to her and worries that Tohru will be depressed someday for burdening everyone's feelings, given that she puts others before herself. Arisa arrives and apologizes to Tohru for burdening her with the former's feelings for Kureno; Megumi, Saki's younger brother, tells Arisa to give it time. Meanwhile, Isuzu is sneaking around the Sohma estate when Ren catches her. The next morning, Tohru returns to Shigure's and thinks about digesting Kureno's revelations one step at time.
52	2	"That's an Unwavering Truth"; Transliteration: "Sore Koso ga, Yuruginai Jijitsu" (Japanese: それこそが、揺るぎない事実)	Yoshihisa Matsumoto	Yūichirō Kido	April 13, 2021 (Note: This episode aired at 1:35 a.m. JST, 5 minutes after the original air time on TV Tokyo.)
Akito dreams about the time in their childhood when she asked Shigure if he loves her, to which he said yes. While Tohru was making flowers for the graduation ceremony, she hesitated to ask Shigure about Akito's gender. The next day at school, Tohru isn't sure who to talk to or how many secrets to keep, then returns to her classroom where two groups of girls stole Kyo's and Yuki's flowers, so Arisa, Saki and some of their classmates go to confront them. While Yuki was patrolling the school, he is startled by a tired Machi -- who ran around the entire school to talk to Yuki. He is content, then Machi leaves after she bashfully hands him a flower. Tohru asks Kyo on how he would feel if someone in the Zodiac already had their curse broken; Kyo shuts down the question, but then feels guilty when he assumes that Tohru is hurt by his answer, to which he amends by giving her a flower. Meanwhile, Shigure goes to Akito to which she asks if she remembers the time in her dream. Later, Tohru thinks to go see Rin and talk about Kureno's conversation. Mitsuru, Shigure's editor, is at a restaurant with Shigure when Akito and some of the Sohma members show up for dinner. Kureno recalls his and Shigure's conversation about Akito and the curse: Shigure understands why she wants to keep Kureno close, then explicitly tells Kureno that he hates him for that reason. Kureno tells him to not hate Akito and implies that she loves Shigure. In the present, Shigure returns to Akito's after the dinner. Akito yells at Shigure for sleeping with her mother, of which he did to get back at Akito for sleeping with Kureno. Shigure talks remembers about that time (Akito's dream), which surprises her, then the two sleep together for the night. He has always been waiting for her love, even to this day. Tohru asks some of Rin's classmates of her whereabouts, to which they are unsure of.
53	3	"I Hope It Snows Soon"; Transliteration: "Fureba Ii no ni" (Japanese: 降ればいいのに)	Tomoko Hiramuki; Takahiro Kawakoshi	Taku Kishimoto	April 20, 2021
The student council tease each other while waiting for Machi to show up. Some girls in her class show up to the room and gossip about the fact that she tried to kill her own brother. Machi shows up but then runs away home. After school, Kakeru does tell Yuki that the rumor isn't far off from the truth: her baby brother is set to be the new successor of the family so Machi tried to kill him out of jealousy, thus her parents sent her to live alone. Kakeru recalls a time when Machi was walking on a snowy street for no reason. The two decide to check up on Machi. At Machi's -- after some shenanigans from Kakeru, -- Yuki helps to clean up her room. She wonders if he came here to ask about the rumor, then says to believe whatever he wants. Yuki wonders if she's scared of perfection, upon which she breaks down and answers him. As a child, her mother wanted her to be perfect at everything, which overwhelmed Machi. After her baby brother was born, her mother ignored her for being boring, which broke Machi. Yuki praises Machi for persevering, which she is very grateful for. She then talks about the incident with her brother: she was putting a blanket on him, but her parents believed that she was trying to kill him. Yuki promises to walk with Machi the next time it snows. During a council meeting, Machi is unsettled by a new box of chalk; to calm her down, Yuki breaks one of the chalks. Motoko Minagawa meets with Yuki before she graduates. In a bittersweet confession, she prays for Yuki's happiness and thanks him for making her school year enjoyable. The seniors graduate. Before Motoko leaves for good, Nao comes up to her and does a similar confession her as she did to Yuki; Motoko is touched by the gesture. Hiro's mother gives birth to her daughter, Hinata Sohma. Kagura is worried about Rin's disappearance. Akito exits a building with a pair of scissors and strands of long, black hair.
54	4	"I'm ... Home"; Transliteration: "......Tadai ... ma" (Japanese: ......ただい...ま)	Hironori Aoyagi	Yūichirō Kido	April 27, 2021
Akito shows Kureno a box that supposedly holds her father. The Sohma family becomes increasingly worried about Rin's whereabouts. Yuki asks Hatsuharu about Rin for Tohru's sake, to which even he is unsure of which unsettles the two boys, then Haru leaves. Kisa and Hiro meet up, where the latter expresses his need to grow up and protect Hinata as a big brother should. Haru also shows up at the Sohma estate, and asks Hiro about Rin; he believes that she was suffering a lot. Hiro then tells Haru the truth that Akito pushed Rin out of a balcony because she found out about their relationship. Hiro apologizes to Kisa for the fact that he was the reason that Akito abused Kisa; Hiro also apologizes to Haru for keeping quiet about the two incidents, then Haru leaves to confront Akito. Kisa accepts Hiro's apology and calms him down. Meanwhile, Kureno notices a maid going to the Cat's prison; noticing something is fishy, he asks the maid for the key who begs him to save whoever is in there. Haru confronts Akito about the incident; she denies it at first then scolds Haru for coming at her despite knowing the consequences. Kureno arrives to reveal that the prisoner was Rin, who had been taken to the hospital. Things escalate when Hatsuharu tries to punch Akito, but then stops; Akito begs for Haru to come back and he does nearly come back, but then Kureno orders him to leave and go see Rin. Akito has a breakdown where she believes that everyone is starting to betray her. Rin wakes up at the hospital but then runs away from there. An older Sohma maid berates Kureno for betraying Akito, and he is shocked that she knew about Rin's imprisonment. Isuzu recalls that night -- the day of Kureno and Tohru's conversation -- when she was caught by Ren for sneaking around the estate. Ren ordered her to steal the aforementioned box in exchange for any secret about breaking the curse. Isuzu complies but then is caught by Akito, who imprisons her and cuts off her hair. Isuzu collapses on the street, but Haru finds her and takes her to the hospital and states that she is home, making Haru happy.
55	5	"I Mean ... You Know, Right?"; Transliteration: "Datte ... Wakaru Deshō?" (Japanese: だって...わかるでしょう？)	Takatoshi Suzuki	Yūichirō Kido	May 4, 2021
Ayame, Hatori, and Yuki go through their emotions about the curse. Everyone at school is shocked that Momiji has had a growth spurt. He and Hatsuharu decide to go to Shigure's for the afternoon, with Kisa and Hiro already being there. At the Sohma estate, Hatori tells Shigure to be kinder to Akito, as she is genuinely getting hurt by Shigure's comments. Shigure responds by stating that he wasn't built for kindness as he is twisted; he ends the conversation by cryptically saying that he's not looking to be like her father. At Shigure's, the kids decide to have curry for dinner. Momiji tells Kyo to not give up on anything and riles him up by saying that Momiji may steal Tohru from Kyo should he give up. Shigure returns home and tells Tohru that she could be the person to save him from emotional despair whilst hoping that Akito matures since she is getting left behind. At night, Akito dreams of the time her father told her that she was born to be special and loved, where at that moment Momiji's curse suddenly breaks. Akito rushes to his place and begs him to stay, and he responds by saying that he'll talk to her later in order to process his emotions. The next day, the kids are worried that Momiji seems different; Kyo finds Momiji on top of the school rooftop where the latter says that Tohru will be happy once Kyo's curse is broken. Later that evening, Momiji confronts Akito and lets out his inner feelings: how he feels free from the curse but laments that he doesn't have a family to return to whilst remaining hopeful about his own future and gaining independence; he ends the conversation by telling Akito to grow up and hopes the best for her.
56	6	"It Was So Foolish"; Transliteration: "Nante, Oroka Nandarō" (Japanese: なんて、愚かなんだろう)	Yoshihisa Matsumoto	Taku Kishimoto	May 11, 2021
Tohru is overjoyed that Rin is safe. Kazuma, Hatsuharu, and Yuki talk about Rin's imprisonment and grows concerned about Kyo's future. Back at Shigure's, Yuki offers to accompany Tohru to the cemetery -- in the event of her mother's death anniversary, but Kyo says that he can't come. The next day, Shigure goes to see Isuzu, who is shocked to learn that she was being duped by Ren and was used as a pawn in her war against Akito. Shigure then tells her that the curse will be broken eventually, which Tohru sadly overhears. Rin is further shocked when she learns that Kureno's curse has been broken, and Shigure continues that curse is slowly reaching its endpoint. He then shocks Tohru that the Zodiacs are aware of Kyo's situation but won't do anything about it since they look down on the Cat; Shigure suspects that she loves Kyo, upon which Tohru tearfully runs away. Tohru reminisces her mother's death and when she swore that her mother should come before anyone else, but panics when she realizes that Kyo is lingering in her mind as her number one. Kyo finds Tohru crying and tells her that she should take her time to decide on what to do in the future. On the day of Kyoko's death anniversary, Kyo finds Tohru's grandfather at the cemetery, who then tells him that the reason that he mistakenly calls her Kyoko is to show proof that her mother existed, or else she would be forever broken. He then tells Kyo about the reason that Tohru speaks the way she does is because of her father's habit. Kagura is at Kazuma's dojo, watching over Tohru, and then tells him that Tohru loves Kyo. Rin asks why Tohru loves Kyo and asks if she pities him. Kazuma hopes that she really does love Kyo, and not just out of pity. Tohru tearfully admits that she really does want the curse broken for Kyo and no one else and confesses her love. Tohru's grandfather continues about how Tohru became exceedingly worried for her mother after Katsuya's death and how they both seemed lonely. Back from the cemetery, Kyo and Tohru talk about her father: she was scared that she would lose her mom after Katsuya's death, thus she decided to pick up her father's speaking habit to keep his memory alive. Kyo calms her down and tells her to believe that that small habit had helped Kyoko a lot. After seeing the cap, Kyo has a breakdown when he remembers that Kyoko said that she'll never forgive him.
57	7	"That's Right, It's Empty"; Transliteration: "Sō da yo, Karappo da" (Japanese: そうだよ、空っぽだ)	Nao Umakawa; Takahiro Kawakoshi	Taku Kishimoto	May 18, 2021
Kyo has a nightmare about his mother and Kyoko, which ends with seeing the sight of Tohru's bleeding body. Ren talks with Shigure about how Isuzu failed to get the box and how Shigure cannot get the box either. Ren remembers the time she seduced Akira into loving her and subsequently marrying her, which was met with disapproval from many. Shigure remembers how he, Kureno, Ayame, and Hatori knew that Akito is to be raised as a male, and noted that Ren is someone to be pitied. Shigure shuts down Ren's seduction and then leaves while Ren berates him for believing in Akito's bonds. Akito reminisces the day of her father's death when Ren berated Akito that no one else was deserving of Akira's love except Ren; Akito responded by stating that she was born to be loved and is special when Ren retaliates by telling her that she'll learn that the bonds were fake someday. Kureno enters her room, and Akito continues reminiscing how she did everything to show off to Ren about the Zodiacs; the two got on a wager about the bonds and said that if Akito loses, she will leave the Sohma family. Akito continues that she believed that she'd win the wager, but now realizes that everyone is starting to leave her behind. Ren storms into Akito's room with a knife and demands the box, to which Akito complied. She continues reminiscing about her father's dying words, hoping that her birth will reconcile his relationship with Ren. After his death, Akito's caretaker gave Akito the box in hopes to make her believe that Akira loved her more than anyone else. In the present, Ren is shocked that the box is empty which Akito knew. Akito grabs the knife, ready to attack Ren when at that moment, Hiro's curse breaks; reeling from the cluster of emotions, Hiro's mother calms him down. Akito goes outside and yells at Kureno for not teaching her right or wrong. Kureno embraces her and tells her that she can start from scratch, but Akito says that it's too late and stabs him and then runs away. Kureno enlists the help of a Sohma maid to find Akito then collapses. Kyo steps out, but Tohru stops him to say something important.
58	8	"I'm Disappointed in You"; Transliteration: "Sonnan ... Genmetsu da ..." (Japanese: そんなん...幻滅だ...)	Hironori Aoyagi	Yūichirō Kido	May 25, 2021
Kyo asks Tohru if he loves her, to which he is shocked and overwhelmed since he believed that he was selfish to spend his remaining time on the outside with her. Tohru chases after him, and he reveals that he was there on the day of the accident and that he knew her mom as a kid. One day after school, Kyoko finds him on a bed of pipes and he reveals his fraught relationship with his parents, then the two become close. On the day of Tohru's disappearance, Kyo promised to protect Tohru for life; but since Yuki brought her home first, Kyo angrily tells Kyoko that Yuki is a bad person to which Kyoko tells him that he should live his life how he wants to; Kyo never went back to see her again. On the day of the accident, Kyo was the only person closest to Kyoko but realized that he'd transform if he saved her and so she died. Kyo continues about how his mother committed suicide and his father blamed him for it. Kyo hates himself that he chose himself, believing it's his fault they died. After being rejected his whole life, Kyo thought Kyoko and Tohru were his hope and he wanted them to live a happy life, which is why he feels guilty that he gave up on them after Tohru's disappearance. Kyoko said that she'll never forgive him -- in her dying words, so he believed that all his shortcomings were because of Yuki, in order to suppress Kyoko's death in Kyo's memory which got triggered again after he saw the cap. Akito summoned Kyo, and the two made a wager that if Kyo loses -- in beating Yuki in a fight before they graduate, -- he would be locked up for the rest of his life. Kyo finally asks if Tohru can forgive him, to which she replies that she doesn't believe her mother would say such harsh words, but Tohru would continue to love Kyo regardless, to which he replies that he's disappointed in her before running away with Yuki following him soon after. Akito shows up at Shigure's with a knife in her hand.
59	9	"What's Your Name?"; Transliteration: "Anata no ... Onamae wa?" (Japanese: 貴方の...お名前は？)	Takatoshi Suzuki	Taku Kishimoto	June 1, 2021
Tohru recounts how Kyo looked very sad, which hurt her even more than her mom's death. Akito approaches Tohru with severe disdain for ruining her bonds with the Zodiacs and notes that Tohru won. Because of her compassion, Tohru feels guilty for ruining Akito's eternal bonds and notes that she is also lonely because of her status. Tohru continues thinking about she is ready to move on from her mom's death and tells Akito that she should be ready to move on from her bonds or else she'll be left behind. Akito breaks down and then runs away with Tohru giving chase; Akito continues how she is scared of getting left behind, and Tohru offers to become her friend. As Akito as reaches for Tohru's hand and accepts her friendship, the ground below Tohru gives away, falling off the cliff. Akito begs for help from Shigure and Yuki, with him overhearing; Kyo Yuki find Tohru's unconscious body, while the former screams and says this isn't what he wanted. Tohru senses that Kyo or Akito are nearby, and thinks about how much she loves Kyo -- from the time they met and how she came to love him. Tohru, believing that she's dying, hopes that Kyo continues to move forward even if she isn't at his side when in that moment, she wakes up and Kyo kisses her to calm her down. The Sohmas learn of Kureno's and Tohru's accidents. At the hospital, Akito complains that neither person is blaming her for their incidents, but does feel very guilty for hurting people that cared for her; Momiji calms her down and tells her to treasure them. Shigure and Hatori talk about how Tohru impacted Akito, and the two girls become closer at the hospital.
60	10	"I Just Love Her"; Transliteration: "Suki Nanda, Tada ..." (Japanese: 好きなんだ、ただ...)	Yoshihisa Matsumoto	Yūichirō Kido	June 8, 2021
Yuki wishes that he lived in a straightforward and kinder world. At school, the student council hears of Tohru's accident and suspects that she is Yuki's girlfriend. Arisa and Saki go to the hospital and see Akito; she apologizes to Arisa for stabbing Kureno, to which she responds by hugging Akito whilst Saki figured out that Akito is a female. Arisa visits Kureno and he tells her that he needs to get away from Akito and start a new life; Arisa responds by saying that she'll go with him and will wait as long as it takes for them to be fully reunited. Hatsuharu visits Shigure while Yuki and Kyo fight for their emotions. The two talk about how they admired and wanted to be like one another, but Yuki ends the fight by saying they have their own lives and tells Kyo to be there for Tohru. He decides to go to his father's before going to the hospital. There, his father spews hateful words at Kyo: blaming Kyo for his father's despair and blaming Kyo for his mother's suicide. He calls Akito to imprison Kyo -- after Kyo said it was his fault, but Kyo learns that his father blamed his wife for giving birth to Kyo which made her commit suicide. Kyo gains independence and says that he will live his life. News of Kyo's "confession" reaches Akito and says that he's free to live outside and that everyone is ready to move forward. Yuki receives a call from Machi and rushes to go meet her. After she is discharged from the hospital, Tohru sprints away at the sight of Kyo and he chases after her while thinking how he loves her.
61	11	"Goodbye"; Transliteration: "Sayōnara" (Japanese: さようなら)	Takatoshi Suzuki; Takahiro Kawakoshi	Taku Kishimoto	June 15, 2021
Tohru continues sprinting while thinking about how Kyo's response has affected her, to the point that she struggles to hear the sound of his name. To combat this, she vowed to be happy when she sees him but ends up sprinting away while continuing to think about how life without Kyo is unbearable. Kyo catches up to her and apologizes for making her cry and vows to never do so; he then confesses his love for her. Tohru reciprocates her love as well, and as the two embrace, Kyo doesn't transform. Akito recounts her conversation with Tohru at the hospital on how she's jealous of Tohru however Tohru says that she isn't a good person but still wants to be Akito's friend. The origin of the curse is revealed. A long time ago, a godlike person lived in seclusion given that they are different from everyone else. One day, a cat came to visit and it implored to stay at God's side, to which they complied. This gave God the idea to invite animals to be his companions and so 12 other animals accepted the offer. God and his animals held moonlight banquets, but at one such event, the cat started to die which gave God a reality check that nothing lasts forever; God then created a spell on a cup to keep their bonds eternal, no matter how many times they are reborn. After all the animals drank from the cup, the cat protested that it didn't want eternity and accept that everything comes to an end, which came out as a betrayal to God and the other animals. After some time, the animals died and God too did die but vowed to keep their eternal promise. In the present, Ayame's curse broke -- to which he embraced Mine and confessed their love, followed by the rest of the Sohmas, and finally to Kyo, wherein he ripped off his rosary. Tohru is overjoyed that each of the Sohmas finds liberation from the curse, all the while God looks over, recounts how the cat's hopes came true, and thanks them for keeping such a promise despite it becoming a curse.
62	12	"You Fought Well"; Transliteration: "Ganbatta ne" (Japanese: がんばったね)	Yoshihide Ibata; Nao Umakawa	Taku Kishimoto	June 22, 2021
Yuki meets with Machi, and the two talk about how they are grateful that they chose the other to love and how they want to make one another happy. Yuki reacts to his curse being broken, wherein he starts tearing up and then hugs Machi; she calls him by his first name and the two kiss. The Zodiacs -- excluding Shigure -- are back at the estate for their final banquet. Akito walks in a female kimono, revealing herself as a woman. She apologizes for the constant torture and hatred she gave the Zodiacs and is atoning for her sins by reinventing herself as a woman. Akito got the kimono as a gift from Shigure, who kept pushing away Akito's love. He did this in order to make her exasperated that she is deserving of no one else but him. After the banquet, Akito finds Shigure and thinks about how much she wants to love and only have him. She says that she will continue to live on the estate and fulfill her duties as the family head, but the two reconcile and confess their love to each other. Later on at Kyoko's grave, Kyo tells Tohru that he'll be leaving the town and living his life as a normal human with Tohru. He'll be going far away from everyone to train in a dojo and offers Tohru to come, to which she immediately accepts because she says that it will be hard for her to say goodbye to everyone and leave town, but it will be harder for her to live without Kyo and always wants to stay at his side. Kyo affirms the same belief and kept the promise he kept to Kyoko a long time ago. In her dying thoughts, Kyoko frets over who will take care of Tohru if she dies and begs for someone to protect her when Kyoko is gone. She sees Kyo in the crowd and begs him to remember their promise and protect Tohru or else she'll never forgive him, but Kyo only heard the last bit. As he runs away, Kyoko dies after she prays that Tohru will be happy in life and is deserving praise after going through hardships. She is reunited in heaven with her husband, Katsuya.
63	13	"See You Again Soon"; Transliteration: "Itte Kimasu" (Japanese: いってきます)	Yoshihide Ibata	Taku Kishimoto	June 29, 2021
Tohru, Kyo, Arisa, and Saki are at the zoo for a date. Kyo remembers when Tohru picked up the beads of his broken rosary to keep a memory of their past selves in order to move towards the future. Yuki tells Kakeru that he applied to a college far away and he too will be leaving the city which Machi knows about. Near the end of their date, Arisa and Saki tell Kyo to protect and cherish Tohru since everyone will be losing a vital piece of themselves because she's leaving. Tohru and the others graduate high school and are ready to begin the next chapter of their life. Tohru recounts the first time she encountered the Sohmas: how Yuki and Shigure found her living in a tent, how the abrasive Kyo tried to fight Yuki, and how she discovered the curse. She laments about how fun the times were and is sad that they are over; Kyo calms her down by saying that she'll get to see the Sohmas again and says that everyone loves her. Yuki is at Machi's and gives her a key to his new place, and he too is sad about Tohru and Kyo leaving. Ritsu, now having cut his hair short, discusses with Kagura about everyone's new beginning and how they want everyone to be happy. Kisa and Hiro talk about how no one will be living at Shigure's house anymore and she begins to cry since Tohru's leaving. Momiji talks about how he's jealous of Kyo for having Tohru but also vows that he'll find his significant other someday. Rin begins tearing up at the fact that everyone is pretending that they forgot about Akito's trauma, but she struggles to do so. Kazuma and Saki talk about how someday everyone will move on from Akito's trauma. Arisa talks to Kureno, on the phone, about how she is ready to be with him when the time comes. Akito talks to Shigure about how she is grateful that she became friends with Tohru. Yuki and Tohru have a heart-to-heart where he tells her that she was like a mother to him and thanks her for changing and being a part of everyone's lives. A flashforward shows that Tohru is married with Kyo and has a grandchild.

== Home media ==
=== Region 1 (North America) ===
Title	Date	Ref.
Fruits Basket Season One, Part 1	November 19, 2019	
Fruits Basket Season One, Part 2	February 11, 2020	
Fruits Basket Season Two, Part 1	January 12, 2021	
Fruits Basket Season Two, Part 2	March 23, 2021	
Season One The Complete Series	June 8, 2021	
Fruits Basket The Final Season	November 29, 2022	

=== Region 2 (Japan) ===
Title	Date	Ref.
Fruits Basket 1st Season Vol. 1	June 21, 2019	
Fruits Basket 1st Season Vol. 2	July 19, 2019	
Fruits Basket 1st Season Vol. 3	August 23, 2019	
Fruits Basket 1st Season Vol. 4	September 20, 2019	
Fruits Basket 1st Season Vol. 5	October 18, 2019	
Fruits Basket 1st Season Vol. 6	November 22, 2019	
Fruits Basket 2nd Season Vol. 1	June 26, 2020	
Fruits Basket 2nd Season Vol. 2	August 28, 2020	
Fruits Basket 2nd Season Vol. 3	September 25, 2020	
Fruits Basket 2nd Season Vol. 4	October 30, 2020	
Fruits Basket 2nd Season Vol. 5	November 27, 2020	
Fruits Basket 2nd Season Vol. 6	December 25, 2020	
Fruits Basket The Final Vol. 1	June 25, 2021	
Fruits Basket The Final Vol. 2	July 30, 2021	
Fruits Basket The Final Vol. 3	August 27, 2021	

== See also ==
- Fruits Basket (2001 TV series)
