= Naruto: Shippuden season 21 =

Naruto: Shippuden
- Season 21
- The first DVD volume cover for the Shippuden story arc titled The Origins of Ninshū: The Two Souls, Indra and Ashura
- No. of episodes: 21

Release
- Original network: TV Tokyo
- Original release: May 5 – October 13, 2016

Season chronology
- ← Previous; Season 20 Next → Season 22

The twenty-first and penultimate season of the Naruto: Shippuden anime television series is based on Part II of Masashi Kishimoto's Naruto manga series. The season focuses on Naruto Uzumaki, Sasuke Uchiha, Sakura Haruno and Kakashi Hatake attempting to defeat Kaguya Ōtsutsuki after Madara Uchiha's activation of the Infinite Tsukuyomi and his ultimate betrayal by Zetsu, which is revealed to be a part of Kaguya. The season also depicts Naruto and Sasuke's respective reincarnate connection to Ashura and Indra and their destined and unavoidable final showdown in the Valley of the End. The episodes are directed by Hayato Date, and produced by Pierrot and TV Tokyo. The season aired from May to October 2016.

The season would make its English television debut on Adult Swim's Toonami programming block and premiere on October 8, 2023, to March 3, 2024.

The DVD collection was released on January 11, 2017, under the title The Origins of Ninshū: The Two Souls, Indra and Ashura (忍宗の起源～二つの魂インドラ・アシュラ, Ninshū no Kigen ～ Futatsu no Tamashī Indora・Ashura) and April 5 under the title The Chapter of Naruto and Sasuke (ナルトとサスケの章, Naruto to Sasuke no Shō).

The season contains three musical themes, including one opening and two endings. The opening theme song for the season is "Blood Circulator" (ブラッドサーキュレーター) performed by Asian Kung-Fu Generation. The first ending theme song, "Ao no Lullaby" (青のララバイ, lit. 'Blue Lullaby') performed by Kuroneko Chelsea, is used from episodes 459–466. The second ending theme song, "Pino to Amélie" (ピノとアメリ, lit. 'Pino and Amélie') performed by Huwie Ishizaki, is used from episodes 467–479.

== Episodes ==
No. overall	No. in season	Title	Directed by	Written by	Animation directed by	Original release date	English air date
The Origins of Ninshū: The Two Souls, Indra and Ashura
459	1	"She of the Beginning"; Transliteration: "Hajimari no Mono" (Japanese: はじまりのもの)	Hisashi Ishii	Masahiro Hikokubo	Min-Seop Shin & Yūko Ishizaki	May 5, 2016	October 8, 2023
After being revived by Black Zetsu, Kaguya senses the Yin and Yang chakra in Sasuke and Naruto before flinging them away with her long hair. She confirms with her Byakugan that they are the reincarnations of her grandsons Indra and Ashura. Kakashi, preoccupied with Obito's seemingly lifeless body, asks Kaguya of her intentions, but she refuses to answer to an "insignificant ant" like him. Deciding to kill all of Team 7, Kaguya teleports them to a lava-filled dimension with Sasuke summoning his hawk to save himself and Naruto while leaving Kakashi to save the others. Sasuke chides Naruto by saying that they are more important than the others, as only they can seal Kaguya away again. As Naruto saves Kakashi and Sakura, Kaguya kills Garuda with some of her hair needles. Naruto and Sasuke proceed to fight Kaguya before she manages to grab them from behind. As Kaguya prepares to kill them both, Black Zetsu manifests from her arms and begins covering Naruto and Sasuke in order to absorb their chakra. Black Zetsu then reveals that all of ninja history has been manipulated by him and Kaguya in order to ensure the latter's unsealing.
460	2	"Kaguya Ōtsutsuki"; Transliteration: "Ōtsutsuki Kaguya" (Japanese: 大筒木カグヤ)	Kazunori Mizuno	Shin Yoshida	Emi Miyaji, Mariko Emori & Masaya Onishi	May 12, 2016	October 8, 2023
As Black Zetsu drains Naruto and Sasuke of their chakra, he reveals Kaguya's backstory to them. Many ages ago in what would become the Land of So, a tree grew from a meteorite that crashed onto the world. Years later, the people of So see a glowing object landing off in the distance. The young So emperor Tenji sends his soldiers and they return with a mysterious woman who, after wiping away the memories of those present, introduces herself as Kaguya and claims herself as protector of the God Tree while requesting an attendant. Soon after falling in love with Kaguya as they both desire peace in the world, Tenji finds himself at odds with representatives from the Land of Ka who seek to expand their territory by any means from false documents to war. Even learning that Ka is starting to stir conflict, Tenji decrees to his subjects they are not to attack Ka on any reason. But when men from Ka attempt to abduct Kaguya, she effortlessly slaughters them and a Ka representative named Suzaku later exposes her actions during peace negotiation. This forces Tenji, unaware that she was pregnant with their twin sons, to order Kaguya's death to keep the peace. Betrayed, Kaguya makes her way to the God Tree while her attendant sacrificed herself to protect her from arrow fire. Kaguya eats the God Tree's fruit and uses her newly gained powers to invoke the Infinite Tsukuyomi, binding Tenji and those caught in its light within the God Tree's roots.
461	3	"Hagoromo and Hamura"; Transliteration: "Hagoromo to Hamura" (Japanese: ハゴロモとハムラ)	Directed by : Naoki Horiuchi; Storyboarded by : Yukihiro Matsushita	Shin Yoshida	Naoki Takahashi, Shinichi Suzuki & Yūko Fuji	May 19, 2016	October 15, 2023
After being born in the aftermath of their mother's Infinite Tsukiyomi, Hagoromo and his twin brother Hamura lived in ignorance of their Kaguya's amoral nature and habit of looking up towards the sky. One day while resolving a conflict over water between farmers, the brothers meet a toad named Gamamaru who points them toward the mountains around the God Tree, and asks them if they know it. The two identify it as the Peak of Demise which their mother told them was off-limits, but Gamamaru reveals the land is weakening because the God Tree and the truth of a ritual practice Kaguya placed for the people to follow. Though Gamamaru told them to see the truth beyond the peak for themselves, the brothers instead encounter a fraud medicine salesman with Hagoromo learning of their mother is viewed as a tyrant in other lands. When Hagoromo notices a girl he cared for named Haori leaving to participate in the God Tree ritual to become its servant, he and his brother confront Kaguya over answers to the ritual. But Kaguya explains that the ritual should not concern them and this it is to prepare for coming of "the others." This forces the brothers to go to the Peak of Demise, Hagoromo awakens the Sharingan upon finding Haori and several others lifeless and bonded to the God Tree's roots. The brothers later meet Gamamaru as he takes them to Mount Myoboku where he uses a Memory Stone to explain the origins of the God Tree and their mother's arrival to the world. Gamamaru revealed that Kaguya revived some of the people she put under the Infinite Tsukuyomi, wiping their memories while having the God Tree draining the land of its natural energy. Deciding that they needed more power to confront Kaguya should she turn hostile, Hagoromo begins training under Gamamaru in use Sage Jutsu. Though Hamura lied of his brother's whereabouts, Kaguya soon caught on to her sons' scheme.
462	4	"A Fabricated Past"; Transliteration: "Tsukurareta Kako" (Japanese: 造られた過去)	Directed by : Ayataka Tanemura; Storyboarded by : Toshihiko Masuda	Shin Yoshida	Tetsurō Taira & Eiichi Tokura	May 26, 2016	October 15, 2023
After Hagoromo completed his training under the Toad Sage, unable to contact Hamura via messenger toad, he decides to confront his mother. But before Hagoromo leaves, Gamamaru gives him a special seal tag instilled with great sage power refined over the centuries in case he must replenish. Hagoromo confronts Kaguya about her actions, the latter beyond reason as she deems her son an ungrateful brat before having a brain-washed Hamura attack his brother. While forced to fight his brother to the death, Hagoromo's Sharingan evolves into the Rinnegan and uses the seal tag to restore Hamura's free will. With both sons against her, a livid Kaguya merges herself into the God Tree and transforms into the Ten-Tails to siphon their chakra. The battle lasted for months before the brothers were able to defeat Kaguya, their mother sealed inside Hagoromo's body. Researching the Infinite Tsukiyomi, Hagoromo was able to free most of the people bound in the God Tree and later extracts his mother's chakra and divides it into the tailed beasts before sealing the now-powerless Gedo Statue within the moon. Hamura, understanding their mother's reason, departs to the moon with his family to watch over her while his brother, revered as the Sage of Six Paths, works to spread Ninshu across the world. However, revealed to have been created by Kaguya seconds before she was sealed, Black Zetsu explains that his purpose was to shape events to enable Kaguya's return.
463	5	"The No. 1 Most Unpredictable Ninja"; Transliteration: "Igai-sei Nanbāwan!" (Japanese: 意外性ナンバーワン!)	Fujii Toshiro	Masahiro Hikokubo	Fujii Toshiro	June 2, 2016	October 22, 2023
Kaguya voices her hatred for her sons. Outraged by Black Zetsu's claims, Naruto frees himself and Sasuke, disagreeing with him about those who shape shinobi history and how mothers should feel about their children. Sasuke surmises they need to create an opening to seal Kaguya, Naruto decides to use a certain jutsu, and starts filling Sasuke in on it. Black Zetsu dismisses them, pointing out Kaguya can absorb all jutsu. From afar, Sakura observes them, relaying the information to Kakashi, who is still in awe of Kaguya's power. Naruto's shadow clone heals Obito. Sasuke is dubious about Naruto's strategy involving a jutsu he practiced in secret even more than the Rasengan, but agrees to try it. He engulfs Kaguya with Amaterasu, which she effortlessly absorbs. Naruto moves in and transforms into a group of naked men, stunning Kaguya. Sakura is irate that Naruto would try that on someone so powerful, but is shocked when Naruto lands a hit on Kaguya. Kakashi wonders if Jiraiya is watching Naruto save the world with perverted ninjutsu. Sasuke teleports Kaguya between himself and Naruto, almost making physical contact, but Kaguya teleports everyone to her ice dimension, locking them in place with ice. Naruto's shadow clone, Sakura, and Kakashi discuss Kaguya's jutsu. Kaguya escapes the ice, and moves in to absorb their chakra again. Sasuke frees himself and Naruto with Amaterasu and Kagutsuchi. At Black Zetsu's suggestion, Kaguya splits them up, throwing Sasuke in her desert dimension. Naruto tries to keep the portal open, to no avail. Naruto evades Kaguya, who causes the surrounding landscape to attack Naruto. Obito wakes up, and is brought up to speed on the situation. They decide to assist in the battle. Sasuke wanders through the desert dimension. Naruto's clone finishes explaining the situation to Obito. They watch the original Naruto dodging the terrain, before finally allowing himself be captured to draw Kaguya out. Obito notices Kaguya's use of Space–Time Ninjutsu, and is certain that he can sync his Kamui with it, and bring Sasuke back if he is in another dimension. Due to the great chakra cost it would require, Sakura volunteers her stored chakra. Obito is prepared to die if he has to. In the real world, the four Hokage converge on Madara's severed lower half, and discuss what has happened and how to proceed. Hagoromo's chakra manifests itself from Madara's lower half, and introduces himself to the four.
464	6	"Ninshū: The Ninja Creed"; Transliteration: "Ninshū" (Japanese: 忍宗)	Directed by : Kiyoshi Murayama; Storyboarded by : Yukihiro Matsushita	Shin Yoshida	Seung Hee Yoo & Aya Tanaka	June 9, 2016	October 22, 2023
Hagoromo explains to the four Hokage that Naruto and Sasuke are his sons' reincarnations, and that they're battling his mother. So the four can fully understand the situation, Hagoromo explains the origins of Ninshū. After Kaguya was sealed, Hagoromo began wandering the world, to restore the land ravaged by the fight against the Ten-Tails, and to find homes for the tailed beasts. Gamamaru gives Hagoromo another prophecy, about the tailed beasts and a "blue-eyed youth" and bids him farewell. Hagoromo comes across a broken bridge, and decides to repair it, against the protests of Futami, a thief who uses the broken bridge to scam and steal from people. Hagoromo warns a would-be victim about him, enraging him. After days watching Hagoromo restoring the bridge, Futami himself starts to help, so Hagoromo can leave sooner, intending to destroy the restored bridge again after he leaves. Seeing the two rebuilding the bridge, others begin to help. After the bridge is done, Futami leaves with Hagoromo, having changed his way. After getting to know each other more, Hagoromo shares his chakra with Futami, who asks to become his apprentice. Hagoromo discovers another purpose for his journey, bonding people through chakra. The two come across another broken bridge, with another thief, and the situation repeats itself. Hagoromo begins amassing more followers, and finds places where he could release the tailed beasts. Hagoromo's followers scatter, spreading Ninshū across the world. On his deathbed, Hagoromo releases the tailed beasts to the places he found. After his journey was done, Hagoromo returned to the Land of Ancestors, where he married and had two children, though his wife died after giving birth to Ashura. Unnoticed by Hagoromo, Black Zetsu set his sights on his sons.
465	7	"Ashura and Indra"; Transliteration: "Ashura to Indora" (Japanese: アシュラとインドラ)	Maki Odaira	Shin Yoshida	Chiyuki Tanaka & Kumiko Horikoshi	June 16, 2016	November 12, 2023
At night, Ashura and Indra read about Ninshū, Indra effortlessly covering volumes of Hagoromo's writings while Ashura struggles. The next day, the two fish together, Indra catching a big fish, and Ashura only getting a piece of driftwood. Indra transforms the driftwood into a fish. Indra showcases his talent at manipulating chakra to his father, brother, and other ninshū followers, calling the hand formations used to shape the chakra "seals" and the effects "jutsu". Indra's innovations change ninshū, giving it practical, everyday uses. From the shadows, Black Zetsu observes Indra. Indra shares his concerns about the potential applications of jutsu with Hagoromo, who argues that if Indra had not had such a breakthrough, someone else would have. Indra and Ashura spar. Futami mentions to Hagoromo he believes the future of ninshū would be safe under Indra's leadership. Ashura goes to play with his friends, who decide to go hunt a wild boar that has been damaging the fields, confident Ashura's Ninshū will save them if necessary. Having previously only detected its presence, Indra meets Black Zetsu, who talks about a power he can awaken if he loses someone he loves. Indra fears for Ashura. Asura and his friends are attacked by the wild boar, which kills their dog Shiro. Ashura struggles to perform Ninshū, but Indra arrives in time to save him. Ashura notices a change in Indra's eyes, which have awakened the Sharingan. Indra confronts Black Zetsu, who tells him to use those eyes to see the truth. Indra grows harsher, more isolated, and more focused on performing jutsu. Black Zetsu continues to influence him.
466	8	"The Tumultuous Journey"; Transliteration: "Shiren no Tabi" (Japanese: 試練の旅)	Directed by : Masayuki Yamada; Storyboarded by : Yukihiro Matsushita	Shin Yoshida	Yūri Ichinose, Masaya Onishi & Zenjirou Ukulele	June 30, 2016	November 19, 2023
Ashura worries that Indra's demeanor will alienate others. Taisō asks him to clear a few trees to make a path between fields, making a shortcut for his mother. However, it was a lie. Later, Taisō is restrained, Indra finding him guilty of having the trees cleared without others' consent, and Ashura gullible for having believed him. Taisō confesses he wanted a path to get medicine for his mother. Ashura asks why he didn't tell the truth, as he would have used Ninshū to heal her, but Taisō reveals his mother hates it. As Ashura was deceived into clearing the path, Indra will not punish him. Hagoromo intervenes, suggesting Indra is being too strict, and that everyone makes mistakes. Indra is adamant that crimes should be punished to deter future crimes. At night, Ashura breaks Taisō out, but they're discovered by Indra, who chastises Ashura and defeats him. From afar, Hagoromo watches the two. At the anniversary of Shiro's death, Ashura and Hagoromo discuss Indra, his eyes, and the differences between him and Asura. The day comes when Hagoromo is to decide his successor as the leader of Ninshū. Hagoromo hands them scrolls, each one with a location that was damaged by the fight against the Ten-Tails. Hagoromo wants each to go to a location, and solve whatever problem remains. He will pick his successor based on the results. Ashura is baffled by Hagoromo's decision, having neither the skill nor the desire to take over Ninshū, willing to simply aid Indra. Hagoromo discusses the two with Gamamaru as the two depart. Ashura notices Taisō following him. Taisō explains that after telling his mother of what Ashura did for him, she told him to go aid him in his journey. The two journey to where the God Tree used to be, finding a village there. The two are attacked by the villagers, fearful they're more robbers. While avoiding one of their attacks, one of the attackers hurts another. Ashura heals her injury. Ashura and Taisō are welcomed into the village. The next day, the two grow suspicious when they're not allowed to go where Ashura senses the God Tree. The woman who Ashura healed, Kanna, wishes him to heal her mother. Ashura notices something with strong chakra connected to her, but can't heal her. Taisō finds graves of several others who perished to the same illness. Ashura decides to go to the God Tree, and is aided by Taisō and Kanna. The three venture down a cave among the God Tree's roots.
467	9	"Ashura's Decision"; Transliteration: "Ashura no Ketsui" (Japanese: アシュラの決意)	Directed by : Atsushi Nigorikawa; Storyboarded by : Yukihiro Matsushita	Shin Yoshida	Mariko Emori, Emi Miyaji & Huang Chengxi	July 7, 2016	November 26, 2023
Ashura feels his chakra reacting to the location. He comes to the conclusion that the sap of the God Tree is what is making people sick. It acts as a fertilizer to the land, and when people eat food grown in that land, the sap builds up on them. Ashura and Taizō suspect that because the village elder had the place under guard, he is aware of this. Ashura, Taizō, and Kanna talk the village elder about the God Tree, Asura explaining he was sent to do something about it. The elders explain how dire their situation was before the God Tree started nourishing the land, with yearly droughts, and countless deaths due to starvation. Kanna is resigned to continue living there and endure what comes. Ashura tells the villagers about the dangers of the God Tree, but the villagers turn against him when they learn he's from the village of Ninshū. Hagoromo and Gamamaru discuss Indra and Ashura's missions, both having been sent to villages with the same problem. In the village he was sent to, Indra is certain all the villagers together won't be able to reach a decision. Thinking back to Hagoromo's words, Ashura decides to help the village without destroying the God Tree, even if it takes him years. Indra returns from his journey. Kanna finds Ashura and Taizō digging a well. Hagoromo wants to wait for Ashura's return before making his decision. Indra meets with Black Zetsu, who continues to influence him. After a year has passed, Ashura returns to the Land of Ancestors with some of the villagers. Gamamaru informs Hagoromo what he learned watching the two from afar. In the village Ashura visited, after learning his plan to dig a well, the villagers helped him, and Ashura taught them Ninshū. Working together, they managed to find water, allowing them to safely destroy the God Tree. Hagoromo reaches a decision.
468	10	"The Successor"; Transliteration: "Kōkeisha" (Japanese: 後継者)	Kazuya Iwata	Shin Yoshida	Eiichi Tokura & Tetsurō Taira	July 21, 2016	December 3, 2023
Hagoromo chooses Asura as his successor to everyone's surprise and Indra questions his decision. Hagoromo reveals that chose Asura because Indra's way of saving the village he went to almost caused its destruction. Later that night, a feast is held to celebrate Asura's appointment however Indra attacks it and reveals to have awaken his Mangekyō Sharingan. Asura is able to withstand Indra's attacks and with help from Hagoromo and the other Ninshū followers, Asura defeats his brother with Sage Art Wood Release: True Several Thousand Hands. Indra then escapes vowing to never acknowledge Asura or Ninshū. Hagoromo recounts how Indra began a sect that emphasizes power and Black Zetsu tampering with the Stone Tablet he left behind to warn about the Sharingan. As he dies, Hagoromo tells Asura of Indra's visit the night before when he vowed to reincarnate until love led Ninshū ceases to be. Hagoromo finishes his story to the four Hokage.
Standalone side story
469	11	"A Special Mission"; Transliteration: "Tokubetsu Ninmu" (Japanese: 特別任務)	Masayuki Kouda	Shuto Tanaka	Masayuki Kouda & Anna Yamaguchi	July 28, 2016	December 10, 2023
Team 7 finishes a mission early in the morning and are dismissed for the rest of the day. Wishing for a higher-rank mission, Naruto suggests finding out Kakashi's true face. Sakura is initially dismissive of the idea, but changes her mind when Sasuke expresses interest in it. Sakura points out their previous failed attempts at discovering Kakashi's face. Naruto believes there should be a photo of Kakashi unmasked, though Sakura reveals she already searched it, and only found masked photos. They are approached by a man named Sukea, who having overheard them, tells them Kakashi's ninja registration photo should show him unmasked. Sukea introduces himself as a photographer interested in getting a big scoop. Sukea joins their mission. That night, the four manage to break into a secret documents' storage unit, and even find Kakashi's registration photo, but are apprehended by Anbu before they can look at it. The next day, they are scolded by the Third Hokage, and when talking to Kakashi, Sukea tries blaming the situation on Team 7. Team 7 calls him out on it, and he offers to photograph Kakashi's face himself while he eats. Team 7 points out they've tried that before, and something always interrupts them when Kakashi has a meal. Naruto tries offering Kakashi dango, but Kiba comes by with Akamaru, who jumps on some pigeons. In Sukea's photos, Kakashi's face is blocked by a pigeon, Akamaru or leaves. Team 7 is about to give up when they're approached by Teams 8 and 10. Later, Hinata runs to Kakashi, saying a woman has drowned in the river. She takes him to her, in reality a disguised Naruto drugged by Sakura. They intend to expose Kakashi's face by having him perform mouth-to-mouth resuscitation, but he decides to take the disguised Naruto to the hospital instead. Hinata reports the plan's fail. On his way to the hospital, Kakashi is attacked by Chōji, distracting him and causing him to land on Shino's kikaichū, leaving him immobilized. Ino tried body switching with Kakashi, but a frog leaps in front of her jutsu as Shino calls back his insects. Shikamaru traps Kakashi with his shadow, and Naruto gets out of his disguise, calling out for Sukea. Shikamaru begins forcing Kakashi to unmask himself, but Team Guy comes around, Neji running away from Lee, who wants to spar with him, followed by Tenten. Neji and Lee kick up some dust running around, while Tenten ends up tripping Shikamaru, breaking his hold on Kakashi. Kakashi vanishes, revealing he was a shadow clone all along. Sukea bids the genin farewell, while Kakashi watches from afar with Team Guy, who are actually transformed shadow clones. When Team 7 moves walk their way, Kakashi and his disguised clones are also released. Sukea grows apprehensive when he walks past Guy, who asks him if there was any trouble, having heard about the earlier commotion with Kakashi and the genin. Guy asks Sukea if they've met before, which Sukea denies. Guy leaves, sure he's met Sukea before. In his apartment, Sukea begins removing his disguise, revealing himself to have been Kakashi all along, and going to shower. Kakashi thinks back to earlier, and concludes his team's team-work is improving, and that he won't be able to pull something like this again many more times.
The Chapter of Naruto and Sasuke
470	12	"Connecting Thoughts"; Transliteration: "Tsunagaru Omoi" (Japanese: 繋がる想い)	Masaaki Kumagai	Katsuhiko Chiba	Kumiko Horikoshi	August 4, 2016	December 17, 2023
Kaguya separates Naruto and Sasuke at Black Zetsu's suggestion. Naruto's clone, Obito, Sakura and Kakashi watch Naruto fighting Kaguya. Obito is certain that he can synchronize his Kamui with Kaguya's Space–Time Ninjutsu to retrieve Sasuke. Kaguya notices them, but keeps focused on the real Naruto. Kaguya attacks the real Naruto, who uses Kokuō's chakra to enhance his taijutsu, and the two clash. Kaguya is pressured by Naruto's clones, and opens another rift. Obito syncs with it, and Naruto follows Kaguya through it. Black Zetsu notices Naruto followed them to Kaguya's main dimension. Black Zetsu urges Kaguya to kill Naruto, despite her wish to absorb his chakra. Kaguya strikes Naruto with her bones. Believing to have killed the original, Kaguya returns to her ice dimension. Obito and Sakura appear from Kamui's dimension, intent on finding Sasuke. Kaguya and Black Zetsu are surprised that Naruto's clones are still in the ice dimension. Sakura channels her stored chakra into Obito, who begins looking for Sasuke through Kaguya's dimensions. Black Zetsu determines the original Naruto has Truth-Seeking Balls. Obito and Sakura find Sasuke, who manages to cross the opening created by Obito's Kamui with his Amenotejikara.
471	13	"The Two of Them... Always"; Transliteration: "Futari o Chanto" (Japanese: 二人をちゃんと)	Directed by : Naoki Horiuchi; Storyboarded by : Yukihiro Matsushita	Yuka Miyata	Naoki Takahashi & Yūko Fuji	August 11, 2016	January 7, 2024
Hagoromo explains Team 7's current situation to the four Hokage, and how it was possible for his spirit to manifest from Madara's severed half. He mentions a jutsu he can no longer perform, having given much of his chakra to Naruto and Sasuke. Obito suffers from the intense chakra he used to find Sasuke, and thinks back to Rin, his old dreams of being Hokage, and his rivalry with Kakashi. Obito focuses on getting the three of them back to the others. Kaguya and Black Zetsu focus their efforts in attack the Naruto with Truth-Seeking Balls on his back, several shadow clones protecting it. Kakashi worries about being of little use in the fight. Obito returns with Sasuke and Sakura. Kaguya ensnares Naruto with her hair and strikes him down, only for it to be a clone as well, the real Naruto having passed it the Truth-Seeking Balls. Kaguya shifts to a high-gravity dimension, bringing everyone, including Kaguya herself, to the ground. Kaguya attacks them with her bones, but the high gravity interferes with her aim. She strikes again, compensating for it, but Obito and Kakashi throw themselves in front of it, thinking of Rin. Obito sends the bone that would have hit Kakashi away with Kamui, while he himself is struck. Obito tells Kakashi to stay a little longer.
472	14	"You Better..."; Transliteration: "Omae wa Kanarazu" (Japanese: お前は必ず)	Kazunori Mizuno	Yuka Miyata	Masaya Onishi & Retsu Okawara	August 18, 2016	January 14, 2024
Obito is struck by Kaguya's bone and begins turning into ash. He explains to Kakashi that the latter still needs to guide his students and the new generation while the former has nothing. Naruto tries to heal Obito to no avail and Black Zetsu mocks Obito for being a traitor, much to Naruto's anger. Obito talks to Naruto that Black Zetsu is right because of his years as a criminal and thinks about his dream of being Hokage. Sasuke tries to attack Kaguya but she diverts them all to another dimension and he goes to fight her while Naruto and Kakashi bid farewell to Obito. Before he dies, Obito credits Naruto for opening his eyes about his mistakes and how much he truly wanted to be Hokage. Seconds before he dies, Obito tells Naruto that he better become Hokage and Naruto vows to do so. After Black Zetsu continues to mock Obito after his death, the enraged Naruto severs Kaguya's left arm, where Black Zetsu is, declaring that Obito was an awesome person. Obito reunites with Rin in the Afterlife.
473	15	"The Sharingan Revived"; Transliteration: "Sharingan, Futatabi" (Japanese: 写輪眼、再び)	Directed by : Kiyoshi Murayama; Storyboarded by : Yukihiro Matsushita	Yuka Miyata	Jae Weon Lee, Seung Hee Yoo, & Aya Tanaka	August 25, 2016	January 21, 2024
Obito meets Rin in the afterlife where she tells him that she was always watching over him and is now happy for him, where all the memories of Rin came flowing to Obito. Obito asks Rin to wait a little longer to help Kakashi, he doesn't want Kakashi to interfere in their time alone. Obito uses Kamui to appear in Kakashi's conscious and tells him he came back to help him and that he wants him to become the Sixth Hokage and Naruto to become the Seventh Hokage. Kakashi opens his eyes and becomes Kakashi of the Sharingan once again, but this time with the Sharingan in both eyes. Naruto and Sasuke continue to attack Kaguya with Naruto using nine Rasenshurikens, each having the nature of all nine tailed beasts, and attacks Kaguya with their fury. The tailed beast chakra inside Kaguya becomes unstable and starts reacting to the tailed beasts inside Naruto. Kaguya then starts attacking everywhere aimlessly, becomes a rabbit like creature, and one of her arms touches Naruto's clone. Naruto says that it will suck all the chakra if it touches anyone. When one of the attacks start approaching Sakura, Naruto asks Sasuke to save her using his left eye's ability, but they see her rescued by another Susano. Both of them wonder who it was, which turns out to be Kakashi who uses Kamui Shuriken and severed many of Kaguya's arms. Naruto starts attacking Kaguya on both sides using shadow clone. With the clone coming from Kaguya's right side, and the original from her left side, she launches an Ash Bone from the right, striking clone Naruto, which was then replaced by Sasuke, using his left eye's ability. Just when Kaguya fears and decides to shift dimensions, Sakura arrives and punches her in the back of her head, silently telling Kaguya not to mock her. Kakashi becomes happy to see their teamwork and remembers about the time when he first met them. Caught off guard by the surprise attack, Kaguya remains there, giving Naruto and Sasuke enough time to approach her and place their sealing jutsu on Kaguya at last.
474	16	"Congratulations"; Transliteration: "Omedetō" (Japanese: おめでとう)	Masahiko Murata	Masahiro Hikokubo	Emi Miyaji, Yūri Ichinose & Anna Yamaguchi	September 1, 2016	January 28, 2024
Naruto and Sasuke perform the Sealing Six Paths - Planetary Devastation on Kaguya to seal her away. She reverts to the Gedo Statue and the tailed beasts are freed. Son Goku compliments that Yin-Kurama's Jinchuriki really gets it done and Yang-Kurama agrees. Kaguya is imprisoned in a levitating satellite as Sasuke tells Sakura and Kakashi that Naruto still had something to do but they needed to get far away. Black Zetsu says he will still find a way to revive Kaguya again and calls Naruto and Sasuke "fools". Naruto tells Black Zetsu to "shut up" before throwing him into the satellite, sealing him with Kaguya and ensuring that she will never be revived in the future. With the sealing complete, Team 7 wonders how they can escape the time-space. Hagoromo and all the previous Kage bring Team 7 and the tailed beasts back, and Hagoromo congratulates them for saving the world. Hashirama forgives Madara for everything and Naruto shares a final goodbye with his father Minato, who wishes him a happy 17th birthday and promises to tell his wife Kushina everything that his son Naruto has told him. All the Reanimated Kage return to the Pure Land.
475	17	"The Valley of the End"; Transliteration: "Shūmatsu no Tani" (Japanese: 終末の谷)	Yoshihiro Sugai	Katsuhiko Chiba	Tsunetoshi Takahashi	September 8, 2016	February 4, 2024
All the previous Kage have returned to the Pure Land and the Tailed Beasts discuss what they plan to do since that now they are free. Gyuki decides to return to Killer B and Yang-Kurama to Naruto and fused with Yin-Kurama to regain his original form. Hagoromo tells the Tailed Beasts that Naruto will serve as a meeting place between them due to them sharing their chakra with him and he asks Naruto and Sasuke if their answers changed after fighting Kaguya. Naruto says no and Hagoromo gives them instructions on how to undo the Infinite Tsukuyomi. However, Sasuke suddenly reveals that he intends to kill the Five Kage and puts the Tailed Beasts under a genjutsu so he can eliminate them as well. Sasuke tells a shocked Kakashi and Sakura that he plans to destroy all of ninja society, starting with his final goal to kill Naruto. Naruto realizes that he will likely have no choice but to kill Sasuke now. As Sasuke starts to leave, a tearfully Sakura tells him that she still loves him but can't do anything for him and pleads with him to not leave if he ever loved her. Calling her "pathetic", Sasuke grabs Sakura by the throat and uses Itachi's Tsukuyomi genjutsu on her, causing her to suffer a violent seizure and fall to the ground. Sasuke says he never loved Sakura and regards her as useless, but Kakashi retorts that only hate needs a reason and Sakura loving him is making her suffer. Thinking of his late family, Sasuke considers her love to be from their failed past and leaves with Naruto to have their final battle. Hagoromo says he is disappointed, but believes Naruto can still save Sasuke. Arriving at the Valley of the End where they fought five years ago, Naruto says he will stop Sasuke from destroying everything and bring back to the village. Sasuke laughs at him and declares that, once he kills Naruto, he will take over the world as the real "Hokage".
476	18	"The Final Battle"; Transliteration: "Saigo no Tatakai" (Japanese: 最後の戦い)	Hiroyuki Yamashita	Yuka Miyata	Hiroyuki Yamashita	September 29, 2016	February 11, 2024
Sasuke explains to Naruto that, based on Itachi's way to protect the village from the shadows, the "Hokage" is an individual who takes on the world's hatred for the greater good. Sasuke decides to kill Naruto in order to completely destroy all of his past, but Naruto refuses to let him do so. They begin their final battle with taijutsu before Naruto enters Tailed Beast Mode and Sasuke uses Susanoo to go on the offensive. As they trade blows and mentally connect, Naruto points out that the Kage are finally united, but Sasuke retorts that is because they had common enemies and will go back to bickering now that it's over, and he will be able to control the world as he sees fit. Gaining the upper hand, Sasuke mocks Naruto for being defensive and lacking killing intent, but Naruto says he doesn't want to kill him. As Hagoromo starts to disappear, Kakashi asks what he should do and Hagoromo asks him to continue having faith in his students. Declaring himself the strongest shinobi in the world, Sasuke uses chakra from the imprisoned tailed beasts and draws it into his Perfect Susanoo similar to the Gedo Statue.
477	19	"Naruto and Sasuke"; Transliteration: "Naruto to Sasuke" (Japanese: ナルトとサスケ)	Hiroyuki Yamashita	Yuka Miyata	Hiroyuki Yamashita	September 29, 2016	February 18, 2024
Naruto uses shadow clones to distract Sasuke while one clone amasses nature energy to fight back against Sasuke's Perfect Susanoo. Once ready, the clones merge into a single avatar and create two Massive Rasenshuriken. Sasuke is delighted that Naruto is finally getting serious but Naruto shouts that he wants to win against Sasuke fairly. Naruto's Massive Rasenshurikens and Sasuke's Indra's Arrow collide, creating a titanic explosion and hurricane-like vortex that devastates the valley and its surrounding forest, including decapitating the Hashirama and Madara's statues. Drained of chakra, they resort to taijutsu. Sakura finally regains consciousness and learns from Kakashi that Naruto and Sasuke are fighting each other to the death. The final battle between the two boys continues on until they are both so exhausted and injured that they can barely stand. Despite being exhausted, Sasuke uses his Rinnegan's power to absorb the chakra Yin-Kurama amassed for Naruto and prepares to kill him, but Naruto counterpunches him due to Sasuke running out of enough energy to keep his Sharingan active. Sasuke prepares a Blaze Release Chidori to end the final battle and Yin-Kurama hands over the last of his chakra by fist-bumping with Naruto and remembers when Naruto vowed to eliminate Sasuke's hatred once and for all. As he and Sasuke race towards each other, Naruto creates a Rasengan while imagining all of his family and friends helping him. Their final attacks collide and the resulting explosion destroys the Hashirama and Madara's remaining statues and engulfs Naruto and Sasuke.
478	20	"The Unison Sign"; Transliteration: "Wakai no In" (Japanese: 和解の印)	Toshiyuki Tsuru	Yasuaki Kurozu	Toshiyuki Tsuru & Hiroto Tanaka	October 6, 2016	February 25, 2024
Thinking they are dead, Naruto and Sasuke have flashbacks of their childhood and how they both felt pain as orphans. Sasuke thinks about what it means to be Hokage and remembers his brother and the Uchiha massacre. Both wake up to find they have both lost an arm after the final clash. Sasuke asks Naruto why he continues pursuing him and is dissatisfied with Naruto's reply they are friends. Naruto explains he feels pain when Sasuke is going through a tough time. Sasuke admits he feels the same way and has always been jealous of Naruto. Sasuke sees Naruto's memories of Itachi explaining the true meaning of Hokage and realizes his newfound desire to return to his friends. The next morning, both are still unable to move, and Sasuke is amused at Naruto for still wanting to continue the fight and admits defeat. He asks Naruto to use his Rinnegan to undo the Infinite Tsukuyomi after his death, but Naruto refuses because he wants Sasuke to work with everyone else. Sasuke is moved to tears by Naruto's words. The ruined hands of the statues and blood flowing out from their amputated arms then depict the unison seal, signifying Naruto and Sasuke's reconciliation.
479	21	"Naruto Uzumaki!!"; Transliteration: "Uzumaki Naruto!!" (Japanese: うずまきナルト！！)	Hayato Date	Yasuaki Kurozu	Yasuhiko Kanezuka & Hirofumi Suzuki	October 13, 2016	March 3, 2024
Kakashi and Sakura arrives and she begins healing Naruto and Sasuke, who apologizes to Sakura. Naruto and Sasuke release the Infinite Tsukuyomi and Sasuke frees the Tailed Beasts. A mass funeral for Neji and the ninjas war dead is held and Naruto becomes World Hero. Sasuke is sent to prison while the Five Kage determine his fate. Naruto is visited by Gaara and the Fourth Raikage Ay, along with Killer B, who congratulate him. Kakashi is chosen as the Sixth Hokage and Shikamaru becomes his assistant. Naruto meets with Iruka and Kakashi at the Academy and Kakashi says he is finally promoting Naruto to Jonin rank. However, because he never completed the Chunin Exams years ago, Naruto has to complete two years of studies, much to his dismay. However, Naruto is cheered up as Iruka helps him and treats him to ramen afterwards. Naruto credits Iruka for being the first person to accept him, and a sentimental Iruka decides to treat Naruto with as much ramen as he wants. Months pass when Sasuke is pardoned for his actions and crimes and decides to wander the Earth. Sakura asks him to wait for his artificial arm to be ready, but he declines, seeing the loss of his arm as punishment for his actions. She then asks him to let her go with him, but he again refuses by kissing her on the forehead on insteant of poking her on the forehead like Itachi did, promise to see her again. Sasuke meets with Naruto, who returns Sasuke's damaged forehead protector, and Sasuke thanks Naruto for teaching him what being a true shinobi really means.

== Home media release ==
=== Japanese ===
The Origins of Ninshū: The Two Souls, Indra and Ashura
Volume	Date	Discs	Episodes	Reference
1	January 11, 2017	1	459–462, 466	
2	February 8, 2017	1	463–465	
3	March 1, 2017	1	467–469	

The Chapter of Naruto and Sasuke
Volume	Date	Discs	Episodes	Reference
1	April 5, 2017	1	470–473	
2	May 10, 2017	1	474–477	
3	June 7, 2017	1	478–479	

=== English ===
Viz Media (North America – Region 1/A)
Box set	Date	Discs	Episodes	Reference
36	December 4, 2018	2	459–472	
37	March 26, 2019	2	473–486	

Manga Entertainment (United Kingdom, Region 2)
Volume	Date	Discs	Episodes	Reference
36	April 29, 2019	2	459–472	
37	July 15, 2019	2	473–486	

Madman Entertainment (Australia and New Zealand – Region 4/B)
Collection	Date	Discs	Episodes	Reference
36	March 6, 2019	2	459–472	
37	June 5, 2019	2	473–486	
