= Naruto: Shippuden season 20 =

Naruto: Shippuden
- Season 20
- DVD cover for the Shippuden story arc titled Infinite Tsukuyomi: The Invocation
- No. of episodes: 45

Release
- Original network: TV Tokyo
- Original release: May 28, 2015 – April 28, 2016

Season chronology
- ← Previous; Season 19 Next → Season 21

The twentieth season of the anime television series Naruto: Shippuden is based on Part II for Masashi Kishimoto's Naruto manga series. The season focuses on Naruto Uzumaki, Sasuke Uchiha, Sakura Haruno and Kakashi Hatake attempting to defeat Madara Uchiha and Zetsu, the ones behind the activation of the Infinite Tsukuyomi. There is also anime original episodes featuring characters inside their own Infinite Tsukuyomi dream and a side story revolving around Itachi Uchiha's life in the Leaf Village and his early days in the Akatsuki. The episodes are directed by Hayato Date, and produced by Pierrot and TV Tokyo. The season aired from May 2015 to April 2016.

The season would make its English television debut on Adult Swim's Toonami programming block and premiere on October 16, 2022, to October 1, 2023.

The DVD collection was released on February 3, 2016, under the title of Infinite Tsukuyomi: The Invocation (無限月読・発動の章, Mugen Tsukiyomi・Hatsudō no Shō), June 8, under the title of Jiraiya Shinobi Handbook: The Tale of Naruto the Hero (自来也忍法帳〜ナルト豪傑物語, Jiraiya Ninpōchō ~ Naruto Gōketsu Monogatari), and November 2, under the title of Itachi Shinden: Book of Light and Darkness (イタチ真伝篇～光と闇～, Itachi Shinden-hen ~ Hikari to Yami ~).

The season contains seven musical themes, including two openings and five endings. The first opening theme song, "Kaze" (風; lit. 'Wind') performed by Yamazaru, is used from episodes 414–431. The second opening theme song, "Line" performed by Sukima Switch, is used from episodes 432–458. The first ending theme song, "Kotoba no Iranai Yakusoku" (言葉のいらない約束; lit. 'A Promise That Needs No Words') performed by Sana, is used from episodes 414–417. The second ending theme song, "Niji no Sora" (虹の空; lit. 'Rainbow's Sky') performed by Flow, is used from episodes 418–431. The third ending theme song, "Troublemaker" (トラブルメイカー) performed by Kanikapila, is used from episodes 432–443. The fourth ending theme song, "Sonna Kimi, Konna Boku" (そんな君、こんな僕; lit. 'Like You, Like Me') performed by Thinking Dogs, is used from episodes 444–454. The fifth ending theme song, "Ao no Lullaby" (青のララバイ; lit. 'Blue Lullaby') performed by Kuroneko Chelsea, is used from episodes 455–458.

== Episodes ==
No. overall	No. in season	Title	Directed by	Written by	Animation directed by	Original release date	English air date
Infinite Tsukuyomi: The Invocation
414	1	"On the Brink of Death"; Transliteration: "Shi no Kiwa" (Japanese: 死の際)	Directed by : Akira Shimizu; Storyboarded by : Hayato Date	Katsuhiko Chiba	Naoki Takahashi & Shinichi Suzuki	May 28, 2015	October 16, 2022
After Naruto Uzumaki loses Yang-Kurama to Madara, Sakura Haruno attempts to save him while Gaara transports them to Minato in order to have Yin-Kurama sealed into Naruto to save him. As Sakura learned her medical ninjutsu is unable to reverse the effects of Yang-Kurama's extraction like Shukaku's estraction from Garra, she resorts to slicing open Naruto's chest and manually pumping his heart. Meanwhile, a distraught Karin is being kept from healing Sasuke Uchiha by Tobi using a miniature version of Hashirama's Wood Style: Several Thousand Hands. Though Karin attempts to counter with her Adamantine Attacking Chains, Tobi impales her with a wooden staff that shoots out several branches. But Karin bites her arm and heals herself as Suigetsu then comes to her aid with his Water Gun: Two Guns. Though Tobi manages to dodge Jugo's attempt to grab him, he is immobilized by Orochimaru placing his curse-mark on the White Zetsu. Karin then resumes running Sasuke as she senses an ominous chakra at his location after Madara left him to die. Meanwhile, Madara absorbs the restored Ten-Tails to become its jinchuriki before making his way towards Obito to reclaim his remaining eye. Along the way, Madara pauses for a moment to spit out the Benihisago and Kohaku no Jōhei from his mouth, which lands on Lee and Guy as they are retreating with Tenten. As Minato and Kakashi Hatake prepare to force Black Zetsu off Obito, Yin-Kurama alerts Minato to Gaara and Sakura's arrival. After learning the situation, Minato decides to transfer Yin-Kurama into Naruto while Gaara helps Kakashi in holding off Black Zetsu. But the transference is intercepted by Black Zetsu as he absorbs the Nine-Tails chakra.
415	2	"The Two Mangekyo"; Transliteration: "Futatsu no Mangekyō" (Japanese: 二つの万華鏡)	Atsushi Nigorikawa	Shin Yoshida	Anna Yamaguchi, Shiro Kudaka & Emi Watanabe	June 4, 2015	October 23, 2022
Now that Madara is nearby, Black Zetsu declares that nobody can stop it from handing over the Rinnegan and Yin-Kurama, detaching itself from Obito's body. As Kakashi and Gaara prepare to attack in order to give Naruto the meanings to survive the extraction, Black Zetsu finds itself unable to leave Obito's body, due to him not allowing it to. Obito questions Madara about who he himself is to the older Uchiha. Madara explains to how Obito as a follower of Madara's ideals is Madara, he who wishes to cancel the world created by the Sage of the Six Paths and to create a new one through the Eye of the Moon Plan. Seemingly giving in to Madara's words, Obito starts walking towards him with Minato trying to attack Madara as Kakashi and Gaara try to stop Obito, only to effortlessly be stopped. However, Obito doesn't take Madara's hand and pierces him in the gut. Recalling Naruto's words, Obito claims that his current self is the same as the one who wanted to become Hokage. He then extracts fragments of Shukaku's and Gyuki's chakra and tells Kakashi to teleport Naruto and Sakura to the other dimension. After Madara stops Obito from going there himself, Kakashi runs to Obito's side, with his old comrade commenting on how Kakashi always looks down upon him, remembering the old times in Konoha.
416	3	"The Formation of Team Minato"; Transliteration: "Kessei・Minato Han" (Japanese: 結成・ミナト班)	Kazuya Iwata	Shin Yoshida	Tetsurō Taira & Masako Miura	June 11, 2015	October 23, 2022
Obito overhears a couple shinobi complaining about completing missions with Kakashi and asks them about it. They tell him Kakashi is ignoring his teammates to complete missions no matter what, which conflicts with what Obito remembers Kakashi saying. They advise him to beware of being assigned missions with Kakashi. Leaving the Academy, Obito asks Rin about Kakashi, and shares his concerns with her. Obito comes across Kakashi and tries to strike up a conversation with him, only for Kakashi to dryly tell him not to worry about him and leave. Obito trains in the rain to catch up to Kakashi, but Rin distracts him for a moment and falls down, and she encourages to keep training. Hiruzen asks Minato to teach Kakashi some humanity. Rin berates Obito for being late to his own graduation ceremony and takes him inside to re-enact the graduation. She gives him his certificate and tells him they were assigned to the same team. Team Minato gathers for the first time, and Minato applies the bell test. The team passes and Minato informs them they'll start with simple, odd-job missions. Obito finds lost objects and pets by asking around the elderly people he often aids and Minato appreciates Obito's kindness towards others. Team Minato completes all available D-rank missions, so they're assigned a C-rank mission, escorting a group of foreign shinobi carrying a message. During the mission, Minato notices they're being surrounded by enemies, and orders Rin and Kakashi to go on ahead, while he and Obito fall back to take care of the enemies. Obito and Minato engage in battle, with Obito being saved from an attack by Minato. Another group of pursuers catch up to Rin and Kakashi's group. Kakashi tells Rin to go on ahead while he stalls the enemies, but one of their escorts is hit and falls off the bridge into a river. Reaching near their destination, one of the escorts thanks Rin and Kakashi, but the other two reveal themselves as traitors and attack him. Knowing that Minato will reach them too late, the traitors prepare to attack Rin and Kakashi.
417	4	"You'll Be My Backup"; Transliteration: "Omae wa Bakkuappu da" (Japanese: お前はバックアップだ)	Directed by : Tokuji Kaneko; Storyboarded by : Shinji Satō	Shin Yoshida	Kumiko Horikoshi	June 25, 2015	November 6, 2022
After being attacked by the traitors, Minato and Obito arrive to back up Rin and Kakashi, but the two traitors escape to regroup. The last escortee asks Minato to ensure that the scroll is real, as two of them were given scrolls. It is discovered that the scroll was a fake and the other escortee that fell had the other scroll. Obito immediately leaves to save the escortee and the others reluctantly follow. The escortee is found by the traitors and attacked, however Obito and Kakashi arrive in time to save him. In the midst of the struggle, one of the pursuers grabs the scroll and they retreat. Kakashi leaves, claiming that completing the mission is his ninja way. He goes after the group and attacks them. Obito sends a signal to Minato and tells him of Kakashi's actions. Minato arrives just in time to save Kakashi and defeats the entire group. Team Minato return the scroll and complete the mission; however, it is discovered that they were decoys and that both scrolls were fakes. Another group was charged with delivering the scroll to ensure it wouldn't be stolen by the traitors. In the present, Madara launches two orbs at Obito and Kakashi to get the Rinnegan and Yin-Kurama. Obito with Kakashi's help transports himself to the other dimension. After convincing Sakura of his changed nature, Obito begins transferring the tailed beasts' chakra to Naruto. In the real world, Guy arrives in the nick of time, saving Kakashi from Madara's attack.
418	5	"The Blue Beast vs. Six Paths Madara"; Transliteration: "Aoki Mōjū tai Rikudō Madara" (Japanese: 碧き猛獣VS六道マダラ)	Directed by : Takuma Suzuki; Storyboarded by : Toshihiko Masuda	Yasuyuki Suzuki	Min-Seop Shin & Yūko Ishizaki	July 2, 2015	November 13, 2022
As Orochimaru and his team reach Sasuke, they realize that the unknown chakra signature is that of Kabuto. Since Kabuto assimilates other people into himself, his chakra signature is unknown, explaining why Karin could not identify the person near to Sasuke. Kabuto explains that he has decided to save Sasuke after coming to realise who he was, thanks to the Izanami. Elsewhere, Guy releases the Seventh Gate, which fails to damage Madara. Knowing that it failed, Guy realises he must use the Eighth Gate, which he knows will kill him. He remembers his time with his father, where he failed to graduate and decided to run 500 laps in order to enter the Academy as an alternate student. However, Guy is unable to finish running 500 laps and ends up passing out while the Third Hokage watches him from the window of the Academy. As Guy apologizes to his father only to be scolded for not having faith, Guy becomes frustrated with his father being mocked and attacks two older ninja, only to end up being brutalized. He's saved from further harm by Kakashi taking out the older ninja. After being saved by Kakashi, Guy watches him leaving with his father.
419	6	"Papa's Youth"; Transliteration: "Papa no Seishun" (Japanese: パパの青春)	Kentarō Fujita	Yasuyuki Suzuki	Shigeki Awai & Yusuke Adachi	July 9, 2015	November 20, 2022
A young Guy questions his father Duy on being optimistic despite criticisms from other people in the village. Duy reiterated that becoming strong is not about winning or defeating enemies, but protecting something precious. Guy continues his training and frequently sees Kakashi, which inspires him to challenge. However, Duy disagrees Guy's proposition on challenging Kakashi and suggests to impose a self-rule. Guy follows and exerts his training just not to challenge Kakashi. After hard work and perseverance, Guy finally graduates from the Academy and start accepting missions. Guy also notices his father taking lousy, low rank missions. Before departing on a mission, Guy overhears a conversation between his father and a Jonin which seems to be dissatisfied with Duy's performance. He also realizes that his father's seemingly underperformance is due to his training on the Eight Gates every night, which Duy passes and trains Guy on using it. During a mission, Guy's team encounters the Seven Ninja Swordsmen of Mist and is cornered. Realising the danger it poses, Duy appears and tells Guy to flee while he holds them off using the Eight Gates. Guy is distraught that his father is about to sacrifice his life but Duy tells his son that he is following his self-rule. In the present time, Guy remembers his father's self-rule: "To protect something precious enough to give your life for" and finally activates the Eighth Gate and is cloaked in red vapor. Madara ridicules him by saying that the red vapor reminds him of falling autumn leaves but Guy rebuffs by saying that those leaves become the nutrients for fresh green leaves and advances to attack Madara with the Evening Elephant.
420	7	"The Eight Inner Gates Formation"; Transliteration: "Hachimon Tonkō no Jin" (Japanese: 八門遁甲の陣)	Masayuki Yamada	Yuka Miyata	Masaya Onishi & Yūri Ichinose	July 23, 2015	December 4, 2022
Guy battles with Madara with the Evening Elephant, however the pain from using the Inner Eight Gates Formation causes him to prematurely end it. In the sky, Guy uses the Evening Elephant again and kicks Madara in the air in order to match his flight. Minato tells the others they have to help Guy, and gives Lee one of his kunai. As Guy begins his second use of the Evening Elephant, Madara shields his attack with his Truth-Seeking Ball, countering with one of his own. Lee throws the kunai between Guy and the attack, so that Minato can use the Flying Rajin Jutsu to send the orbs away. Gaara lifts Kakashi close to Madara so that he can use Kamui to create an opening in Madara's defense. Guy lands the final "step" of the Evening Elephant directly into Madara, pushing him through the back of his shield. Despite the devastating attack, Madara stands once again, stating his excitement has not reached this level since fighting Hashirama. After waking up in the dimension, Naruto finds and questions a floating man named Hagoromo Ōtsutsuki, the Sage of Six Paths who tells Naruto about the cycle of reincarnation of the Sage's sons, Indra and Ashura. Haguromo also tells Naruto about the lack of ability, especially in comparison to that of the elder brother. As Naruto recognizes the traits in himself, Hagoromo reveals to him that he is the reincarnation of his son, Ashura.
421	8	"The Sage of the Six Paths"; Transliteration: "Rikudō Sennin" (Japanese: 六道仙人)	Directed by : Kazunori Mizuno; Storyboarded by : Shinobu Tagashira	Katsuhiko Chiba	Noriko Ohtake, Mariko Emori & Anna Yamaguchi	July 30, 2015	December 11, 2022
Learning that Naruto and Sasuke are the reincarnation of Ashura and Indra, Hagoromo explains that Hashirama and Madara are the previous ones, and that by taking Hashirama's power, Madara recreated Hagoromo's chakra, awakening the Rinnegan, despite leaving Indra's descendants instructions against it. Hagoromo explains that his mother Kaguya used her powerful dōjutsu to rule over humanity and Madara attempts to acquire the same power. As Haguromo requests Naruto to stop Madara, the chakra of all tailed beasts converge and Hagoromo hears to notes his prophecy. Entrusting only Asura had created so much conflict, Hagoromo also asks Sasuke to cooperate, and entrusts both of them with his powers. Having survived and being impressed by Guy's Evening Elephant, Madara asks Guy to keep on fighting, deeming him the strongest taijutsu user he faced. Guy prepares to use his final technique while Naruto and Sasuke recovers. As Guy prepares the Night Guy, Kakashi recalls his past about his father's accurate prediction of Guy's potential. Guy obliterates half of Madara's body with his final attack, however he fails to kill him. Madara regenerates his body and attempts to destroy Guy's disintegrating body with a Truth-Seeking Ball, but Naruto kicks it away and recovers Guy to save him. Naruto tells Madara that he changed like Obito and declares that he will change the world with his new powers.
Standalone side story
422	9	"The Ones Who Will Inherit"; Transliteration: "Uketsugareru Mono" (Japanese: 受け継がれるもの)	Directed by : Takuma Suzuki; Storyboarded by : Shinji Satō	Yuka Miyata	Min-Seop Shin & Yūko Ishizaki	August 6, 2015	December 18, 2022
Konohamaru cleans Naruto's apartment and sees him returning home after training. Keeping his normal clothes on, Naruto teaches Konohamaru how to use the Rasengan. While Naruto leaves to rescue Gaara from the Akatsuki, Konohamaru has trouble with his first phase of technique training and improves with his Sexy Jutsu. Using sexual women magazines as a consequence to Ebisu's distress, Konohamaru mastered Naruto's first lesson. Naruto returns and gives Konohamaru a rubber ball for his second phase of training, before leaving the village again to find clues about Sasuke. Konohamaru gets Ebisu's unusual help and reaction along with his teammates, but fails to complete training with the Rasengan.
423	10	"Naruto's Rival"; Transliteration: "Naruto no Raibaru" (Japanese: ナルトのライバル)	Directed by : Akira Shimizu; Storyboarded by : Shinji Satō	Yuka Miyata	Kumiko Horikoshi	August 6, 2015	January 8, 2023
After Konohamaru succeed his second part of the Rasengan mastery training, Naruto teaches Konohamaru how to use Wind Chakra nature. As Kakashi and Yamato see Konohamaru's unorthodox training method for the first two steps, Naruto tells Konohamaru the final phase of his training, but Konohamaru fails to create Shadow Clones and challenges Naruto to see who will master their respective new technique first. Naruto successfully adds his wind chakra nature to his Rasengan and Konohamaru mourns for Asuma. Konohamaru learns the Shadow Clone jutsu and the Rasengan taught by Naruto. As Naruto leaves the village, Konohamaru uses what he learned to attack Pain. Naruto thanks Konohamaru for storing his old stuff in the evacuation shelter.
Infinite Tsukuyomi: The Invocation
424	11	"To Rise Up"; Transliteration: "Tatsu" (Japanese: 立つ)	Directed by : Tomokazu Iwasaki; Storyboarded by : Yukihiro Matsushita	Yasuyuki Suzuki	Naoki Takahashi & Shinichi Suzuki	August 13, 2015	January 15, 2023
Madara is puzzled by Naruto stopping Guy's chakra from fading. Madara defends himself from Naruto's punch with his remaining Truth-Seeking Ball, noticing an increase in Naruto's power. With Son Gokū's chakra, Naruto creates a lava Rasenshuriken and attacks Madara and the tree with it, dodging Madara's Limbo: Border Jail. Naruto's attack severs the tree, which appears to tell Madara to absorb it, Madara actually being told that by Black Zetsu telepathically, which Madara does. Naruto takes Guy to Lee and Gaara. In Kamui's dimension, Sakura thanks Obito for saving Naruto, and Obito has a request for her. Sasuke frees Tobirama from Madara's Black Receivers, Tobirama notices a change in him, and Sasuke asks if Tobirama can teleport him. Madara recovers from having absorbed the tree, telling Naruto he can't be defeated. Naruto picks up one of his father's kunai, powering up with his own Truth-Seeking Balls, that he would not be alone, as Sasuke appears beside him with a newly awakened Rinnegan in his right eye. Madara notes he himself possesses both their powers, and prepares to fight. Madara attacks, but Naruto deflects the attack and Sasuke evades it completely. Madara realises they have discovered the working of his Limbo. Naruto readies a Rasengan with Shukaku's cursed seals. Madara escapes Naruto and Sasuke's attack by sacrificing his Limbo, and flies away to steal Kakashi's Sharingan. Sasuke manages to cut Madara in half, but he manages to warp into Kamui's dimension. There he attacks Sakura, who at Obito's request, is about to destroy the Rinnegan so Black Zetsu cannot get it for Madara.
425	12	"The Infinite Dream"; Transliteration: "Mugen no Yume" (Japanese: 無限の夢)	Directed by : Ayataka Tanemura & Kazuya Iwata; Storyboarded by : Masahiro Sasaki	Katsuhiko Chiba	Tetsurō Taira & Eiichi Tokura	August 20, 2015	January 22, 2023
Obito saves Sakura from Madara's attack, sending her back to the real world. She tends to Kakashi's injury, and explains Obito's warning about Madara retrieving his Rinnegan. Naruto finishes sealing Madara's shadow. Madara notices the cursed seal he placed on Obito's heart is gone. Obito tells him he had Kakashi destroy it in their earlier battle, since it prevented Obito from absorbing the Ten-Tails, and Madara reveals himself as the mastermind behind Rin's death, which meant to turn all the positive feelings Obito had into hatred, moving in to retrieve his Rinnegan. Naruto reaches his teammates, and restores Kakashi's original eye. Kakashi watches nostalgically as Team 7 bickers, remembering their goals. He asks Sasuke what is his goal now, but before Sasuke can answer, he senses Madara's arrival, and urges them to remember their teamwork. Madara arrives with Black Zetsu now in control over Obito's body. Though scared, Sakura charges ahead, intent on creating an opening for Naruto and Sasuke, but is stopped by Madara's shadow. They retrieve her. Madara takes off to the sky, and creates multiple Chibaku Tensei, having them fall from the sky. Naruto and Sasuke move in to destroy them, while Naruto's clones deal with Madara's four new shadows. In the sky, Madara recalls the text from the stone tablet, and removes the plating from his forehead, revealing a third eye, the Rinne Sharingan. The eye opens, and is reflected on the moon, casting the Infinite Tsukuyomi.
426	13	"The Infinite Tsukuyomi"; Transliteration: "Mugen Tsukuyomi" (Japanese: 無限月読)	Directed by : Sumito Sasaki; Storyboarded by : Atsushi Nigorikawa	Shuto Tanaka	Masaya Onishi & Yūri Ichinose	August 27, 2015	January 29, 2023
Madara reflects his Rinne Sharingan on the red moon and activates the Infinite Tsukuyomi. The bright light interrupts the ongoing fight between Tobi and the Allied Shinobi Forces, and traps everyone on the planet into the irresistible genjutsu, except Team 7 protected by Sasuke's Susanoo, Black Zetsu and the reincarnated Hokages. The trapped shinobi on the battlefield get caught into the roots of the Shinju one by one, despite Hiruzen's intervention. As Tobi releases the traumatized host, Hiruzen fails to stop Yamato from being trapped in the genjutsu. He envisions himself becoming the new leader of Team 7 and considers it the place he belongs to, unaware of it being merely a dream. Minato awakes in Konohagakure and witness that all citizens were caught by the roots.
427	14	"To the Dream World"; Transliteration: "Yume no Sekai e" (Japanese: 夢の世界へ)	Directed by : Hiroyuki Tsuchiya; Storyboarded by : Yukihiro Matsushita	Yuka Miyata	Min-Seop Shin, Yūko Ishizaki & Hyun-Woo Joo	September 3, 2015	February 5, 2023
As Madara uses the Rinne Sharingan at the sky behind the red moon to immobilize and trap Tenten with the Shinju's roots, she fails to seal Madara with the Treasured Tools. Tenten wakes up and finds herself at home about the alternate timeline, and sees her friends with different personalities she remembers. Learning that the Minato's statue face is changed into Sakura's father under Madara's genjutsu, Tenten researches the genjutsu and ostracizes her friends and being concerned. Hinata takes Tenten's scroll with the weapons and demands an explanation for behaviour. Before Menma intervenes and gives the scroll back to Tenten, who denounces to the villagers about the wrong timeline and the merchant is intrigued by her actions.
428	15	"Where Tenten Belongs"; Transliteration: "Tenten no Ibasho" (Japanese: テンテンの居場所)	Masayuki Yamada	Yuka Miyata	Zenjirou Ukulele, Mariko Emori & Naoki Takahashi	September 3, 2015	February 12, 2023
Thinking about her friendship, Tenten asks Kurenai to learn more about the genjutsu, but in her dream world, Kurenai refuses, and they discuss various methods about failed attempts. Later, Tenten sees the man disguised as a merchant, who asks and gives a map to Tenten about the Rain Village that can break the genjutsu. That night, the guards capture and arrest Tenten for attempting to leave the village. They reveal the intel about the Rain ninja attack, checking the map, which secretly revealed as a letter. While in jail, Tenten sees Lee and Neji calling outside. While Tenten recalls her friendship, the Leaf Village is invaded by intruders of the Rain ninja that uses the summoning formula. Menma brings the man in jail and asks her Tenten to help everyone. As Menma with the Tailed Beast Mode distracts Hanzō and his giant salamander, Tenten uses her Treasured Tools scroll to defeat Hanzō to thwart the attack of the Rain ninja. As Menma and friends congratulate Tenten, she smiles and says that she belongs in the dream world.
429	16	"Killer Bee Rappūden: Part 1"; Transliteration: "Kirābī Rappūden・Ten no Maki" (Japanese: キラービー落風伝・天の巻)	Directed by : Yoshinobu Tokumoto; Storyboarded by : Toshihiko Masuda	Katsuhiko Chiba	Shigeki Awai & Yusuke Adachi	September 10, 2015	March 5, 2023
Killer Bee, Yugito and their respective tailed beasts, Matatabi and Gyūki in chibi forms, infiltrate the Sand Village to rescue Gaara and Shukaku, and Gyuki restrains to defeat the gigantic Karasu. Bee frees Gaara and tells him that their mission is unite all Jinchūriki with tailed beasts, while Yugito retrieves and gives Gaara his sand gourd. As Yugito and Bee free Naruto and Kurama from being locked up in the mouth of Tsunade's statue from the Leaf Village, they trigger a fail-safe trap and being sucked there and detained underground by Tsunade, Shizune and the Anbu Black Ops. Gaara challenges Tsunade to a dice game with Shukaku transforming into a replica and temporary holds the form shortly while Tsunade shakes the dice, before Gyūki spews a dust cloud of ink and the group of Jinchuriki escapes. They use clones to distract Yamato, Yūgao and the Anbu for arriving at the ramen shop. The group of Jinchūriki arrive on the outskirts of the Waterfall Village and confronts to battle Itachi, Sasori and Deidara of the Akatsuki.
430	17	"Killer Bee Rappūden: Part 2"; Transliteration: "Kirābī Rappūden・Chi no Maki" (Japanese: キラービー落風伝・地の巻)	Kazunori Mizuno	Katsuhiko Chiba	Kumiko Horikoshi & Masaya Onishi	September 17, 2015	March 12, 2023
As Naruto asks about Sasuke to Itachi who leaves organization to join with Nagato, Fū arrives before Sasori and Deidara flees. Gaara asks Fū to give a fist bump and asks her to join them. Bee tells Fū about the information of the Ten-Tails and their objective to protect the princess who sealed it. The group arrives in the village and asks Roku and Son Gokū to join them, before noticing a hawk spying on them and Chōmei uses Scale Powder to knock it out which reveals to be Sasuke, who leaves before Orochimaru summons a giant snake, which the five Tailed Beasts defeat it, forcing Orochimaru and Kabuto to retreat. While Naruto, Gaara, Fū, Yugito and Utakata plan to protect the castle, Killer Bee and Han find Yagura and asks him to join with them. Soon after protecting the castle from the clones of White Zetsu, the nine Jinchiriki combined powers with the Tailed Beast Bomb to counter against the Gedo Statue's. As the nine triumph at the castle in Bee's dream, he chuckles to himself while being trapped in Madara's genjutsu.
431	18	"To See That Smile, Just One More Time"; Transliteration: "Ano Egao o Mōichido" (Japanese: あの笑顔をもう一度)	Directed by : Kiyoshi Murayama; Storyboarded by : Shinji Satō	Yuka Miyata	Takayoshi Hayashi & Dae-Hoon Kim	September 24, 2015	March 19, 2023
Being caught in the Infinite Tsukuyomi, Karin's past memories revealed ten years ago in the Grass Village that Karin's mother suffers with critical condition helping the injured ninjas. That night as Zōsui brings Karin to the hospital, she gets her healing bite abilities that treats anyone who are wounded. Mourning for her mother and being horrified from the bite marks on her body, Karin is assigned to the medical team, while she stays at home. Later, she heals the group of grass ninjas at the battlefield, before she collapses from exhaustion. Assigning to the Chūnin Exams, Karin keeps the earth scroll at the Forest of Death and being saved by Sasuke who defeats a large bear. Zōsui becomes disappointed and sends her to the "North Fortress", where their allies are fighting against the Kaguya Clan. Fearing that she will die from biting injuries, Karin arrives and heals them. Orochimaru saves Karin from two thugs and she joins him. At the Sannin's hideout, Kabuto asks Karin to show medical abilities to Orochimaru, and at the Northern Hideout Kabuto informs Karin to help out with the experiments about Jūgo. Soon after Orochimaru recollects information with Karin, she sees Sasuke again strolling through the room. As Sasuke establishes "Taka", Zōsui and his men betray Karin and she brutally kills them, before collapsing. Sasuke recovers Karin who asks him to smile.
Jiraiya Shinobi Handbook: The Tale of Naruto the Hero
432	19	"The Loser Ninja"; Transliteration: "Ochikobore Shinobi" (Japanese: 落ちこぼれ忍者)	Directed by : Akira Shimizu; Storyboarded by : Yukihiro Matsushita	Junki Takegami	Naoki Takahashi & Shinichi Suzuki	October 1, 2015	March 26, 2023
Being caught in the Infinite Tsukuyomi, Tsunade dreams about changing the past that she sits near a lake and hears Jiraiya telling her that he finished his latest work before leaving. She looks at the papers, which are titled "Jiraiya's Ninja Scrolls" and recalls when he was still in the middle of writing it and he asked her to be the first one to read it, even though she declined. As she reads it, the story begins with the tale of a Nine Tailed Fox Spirit, which can smash mountains and create tidal waves and a band of ninja arose to defend their village when it attacked until a lone shinobi staked his life to seal the beast away. The hero who fought the Nine Tails is revealed to be Minato, who survived the battle. One morning, he greets Kushina, who also survives and asks him how his meeting with the Third Hokage went. Minato remembers him and the Third Hokage meeting with the Uchiha Clan to ensure their allegiance with them will continue forever. Naruto wakes up and goes outside for the mission. The villagers are aware of Naruto being the Jinchūriki of the Nine Tails, but respects for him due to being the Fourth Hokage's son. He arrives at the Uchiha compound to pick up Sasuke and greets Itachi. Sasuke is displeased to have to be picked up Naruto every morning and denies Naruto's insistence they are friends before running off to meet up with their team. At the village's gates, two guards find a passed-out ninja, who only says "Ageha" when they ask him what's wrong. Team 7 goes to the cemetery to visit the grave and monument of the ninjas who died in combat and tells them a story of a shinobi captain who committed suicide after being condemned for saving his comrades rather than completing the mission. He reminds them the importance of teamwork and asks them to go train. Sasuke privately asks why was he placed on the same team with Naruto, even though he says he is not against it. Kakashi assumes Sasuke, the best student of his class, is frustrated that the team is getting S-rank missions and blames Naruto, the last of their class, for this. As Naruto and Sakura walk, he shows excitement for their mission and when asked by Sakura for this, he replies he is going to be Hokage one day. Sasuke agrees but adds due to Naruto being the Fourth Hokage's son, he is shown favoritism. Angry, Naruto and Sasuke fight but Sakura stops them. Naruto challenges Sasuke to race with him to the top of a rock and takes off without warning. Sasuke and Sakura see a signal fired into the sky, and Kakashi tells them the Hokage is calling for them to assemble. As Naruto races to the rock, he vows to himself to never give up, and doesn't notice the crack in the ground and falls. As he panics, he remembers Jiraiya telling him it would be interesting to see if the power that was given to him is truly for him and Naruto has to figure a way out if he lives. Naruto enters into his consciousness and encounters Kurama. Naruto is fully aware of Kurama being inside his body and demands Kurama lend him its chakra, to which Kurama replies he is mistaken and envelopes him with its chakra, saying that if Naruto dies so does Kurama. Naruto snaps back into reality and remembers when Jiraiya taught him the Summoning Jutsu, and Naruto successfully summons Gamabunta, saving himself. Kakashi, Sasuke and Sakura later arrive to find Naruto unharmed. In his office, Minato remembers the day the Nine Tails attacked the village and Kushina was about to reseal the beast back into her body, at the cost of her life. Minato convinced her to instead seal half of Kurama's chakra in her and the other half in Naruto. In an earlier talk, Jiraiya told Minato that Naruto will learn how to control Kurama's chakra in no time. Minato wonders that if Naruto is the "Child of the Prophecy" but has not fully controlled the Nine Tails's chakra, was he too soon to give Naruto his mission. Team Kakashi, Guy, Asuma and Kurenai gather together and are informed they will be searching for missing shinobi, and they scatter to different routes.
433	20	"The Search Mission"; Transliteration: "Shutsugeki・Tansaku Ninmu" (Japanese: 出撃・探索任務)	Maki Odaira	Junki Takegami & Yasuyuki Suzuki	Zenjirou Ukulele & Yūri Ichinose	October 8, 2015	April 2, 2023
Inside the Infinite Tsukuyomi, Tsunade carries on reading Jiraiya's latest work. A concerned Minato interviews the injured genin, who can only remember Ageha butterflies, and discusses this finding with Tsunade. Minato provides the details of the mission to the four Leaf teams, instructing them not to attempt to rescue the missing shinobi should they be found, and instead contact Konoha immediately. Shikamaru instantly understands that as they are being given this mission because more experienced shinobi seem to be the ones targeted. Team 7 stops for a moment, noticing the Ageha butterflies, Naruto goes off chasing them, followed by Sasuke, intent on bringing him back. Elsewhere, a mystery man performs a jutsu that targets the jōnin leaders, dragging them underground. At the sites of their disappearances, the Flying Raijin Kunai given to them by Minato. Just before Guy's disappearance, Neji detects an underground chakra flow, that vanishes after Guy is taken. Shikamaru deduces that what happened to their team also happened to others, and decides to wait for Team 8 to reach them, as they are the best trackers, before deciding on a plan. Team 7 is intercepted by Hidan while looking for Team 8. Hidan wounds Naruto, managing to acquire his blood, and proceeds to curse and injure him. Team 10 is attacked by Yahiko, Konan, and Nagato.
434	21	"Team Jiraiya"; Transliteration: "Chīmu・Jiraiya" (Japanese: チーム・ジライヤ)	Directed by : Takuma Suzuki; Storyboarded by : Yukihiro Matsushita	Junki Takegami & Yasuyuki Suzuki	Min-Seop Shin, Hyung-Shik Shin, Jung-Duk Seo & Yūko Ishizaki	October 15, 2015	April 9, 2023
Tsunade continues to read Jiraiya's novel. The Naruto that Hidan cursed is revealed to be a shadow clone, and the real Naruto reveals himself with more clones and defeats Hidan. Yahiko introduces himself, Nagato, and Konan as Team Jiraiya to Team Asuma, and the two teams begin to fight. Black tendrils rise behind Team Kakashi and Hidan uses the distraction to defeat Naruto's shadow clones. The tendrils try to capture Sakura, but Naruto and Sasuke intervene. Team Jiraiya pushes Team Asuma in certain direction, and stops attacking. Hidan escapes and meets up with Kakuzu who is carrying Kakashi. Kakuzu leaves Kakashi with Hidan, and goes retrieve the other captured team captains. Team Kurenai finds signs of Team Asuma's fight, and follows them. Team Asuma finds an abandoned village. Team Guy meets up with Team Kakashi, and the two catch each other up on what happened. Team Asuma spots two children in the village and decides to follow them. Team Jiraiya observes the children, and when Team Asuma arrives, Yahiko attacks them. Shikamaru strikes back, which riles Nagato up, causing his powers to flare up and collapse the house. The crumbling attracts the attention of the other teams. Team Jiraiya goes into the sinkhole to save the children. Ino and Chōji want to jump in to save the children as well, but Shikamaru tells them not to.
435	22	"Order of Priority"; Transliteration: "Yūsen Jun'i" (Japanese: 優先順位)	Directed by : Kazuya Iwata; Storyboarded by : Shinobu Tagashira	Junki Takegami & Yasuyuki Suzuki	Masaya Onishi, Mariko Emori & Chiyuki Tanaka	October 22, 2015	April 16, 2023
Tsunade continues reading Jiraiya's novel. In it, Shikamaru advises his team not to go into the sinkhole. Teams Kakashi and Guy arrive in the village, and notice a commotion. From outside the village, Team Kurenai also notices the sinkhole. Team Jiraiya look for the children, and Nagato worries about his Rinnegan. Shikamaru explains to his team why they should prioritise meeting up with the other teams. Team Jiraiya finds a tunnel, and Konan finds a teddy bear belonging to the children. They head down the tunnel. Team Asuma comes across with a praying woman, who explains strangers told the villagers the village could become a battlefield, and to evacuate it, as well as telling them about the village's protector, Mashima. Team Jiraiya is attacked by a creature in the tunnels, but Nagato protects them. Teams Guy and Kakashi witness their team captains inside a sphere. The one responsible berates the genin for sacrificing their comrades to follow rules. Naruto and Neji jump into the sphere after the kidnapped shinobi, and the spheres disappears with them. Konan saves the two children from the creature in an underground lair. Team Asuma investigates a shrine to Mashima and find a trapdoor. During a fight, Team Jiraiya discovers there is a second creature. Chōji falls from the ceiling and saves Konan and the children, while Shikamaru immobilises one of the creatures. Teams Kakashi and Guy wonder where Naruto and Neji vanished to. Naruto and Neji wake up in a strange location, and are met by a masked individual, who Neji notices to have a Byakugan. The masked individual berates them for putting rules ahead of the lives of children, and invites Neji to discover the secrets Konohagakure has in that village.
436	23	"The Masked Man"; Transliteration: "Kamen no Otoko" (Japanese: 仮面の男)	Directed by : Ayataka Tanemura; Storyboarded by : Sumio Watabane	Junki Takegami, Yasuyuki Suzuki & Yuka Miyata	Tetsurō Taira & Eiichi Tokura	November 5, 2015	April 23, 2023
Team Asuma aids Team Jiraiya in rescuing the children from the underground creatures. Chōji is attacked by one of them, and is saved by Nagato. The two teams return the children to their mother. Team Jiraiya thanks Team Asuma for coming to their aid, and surmises they also share some of Jiraiya's values. Team Jiraiya asks them to join, but Team Asuma refuses, wanting to find Asuma. Shikamaru deduces Team Jiraiya does not want them dead, and is following orders from someone else. They prepare to fight again, but Team Jiraiya leaves just before they're joined by Team Kurenai. Shikamaru does not tell them about Team Jiraiya, and decides they need to both report to Konohagakure and regroup with Teams Kakashi and Guy. Lee and Sasuke discuss about returning to the village or keep looking from their vanished team-mates and sensei. The masked man takes Naruto and Neji through a gate, who are shown images from the Hyūga Affair. The three discuss the events witnessed, and the masked man asks Neji to join him and force change in Konohagakure. Elsewhere, Jiraiya finds one of Orochimaru's compounds.
437	24	"The Sealed Power"; Transliteration: "Fūin Sareshi Chikara" (Japanese: 封印されし力)	Directed by : Masayuki Yamada; Storyboarded by : Yukihiro Matsushita	Junki Takegami & Yasuyuki Suzuki	Kumiko Horikoshi	November 12, 2015	April 30, 2023
Shizune approaches Tsunade, concerned she hasn't eaten all day. Tsunade attributes it to not being able to put down Jiraiya's novel about the younger generation of Konohagakure. Shizune offers to bring her dinner, and Tsunade resumes reading. In the novel, Neji question the masked man's motives. He says that by changing how a village such as Konohagakure operates, the other hidden villages will follow, changing the world for the better. The masked man requests Neji to see what he means. Neji agrees to hear him out, and when Naruto tries to interfere, the masked man paralyses him. Neji promises to return to Naruto once he has seen what the masked man wants, and the two depart. Jiraiya ventures into Orochimaru's hideout, and comes across a bandaged individual. Team Jiraiya reports to the masked man about the incident with the children, including how the Konoha genin eventually helped them, despite the directives of their mission. The masked man ponders about it, and instructs them to resume surveillance. Neji asks with the Konoha genin are his team-mates, which the masked man confirms, and asks Neji if he wants to see if they can change the future of shinobi. Naruto tries in vain to access the Nine-Tails's chakra. Sasuke and Sakura discuss the mission's situation. Lee and Tenten search for Neji and Guy, which Kiba smells from a distance. Hinata spots Neji and the masked man observing Sasuke and Sakura, as well as Sasori. Sasuke detects Sasori's presence and attacks, Sasori begins to fight the two. Teams Asuma and Kurenai head out towards Sasuke and Sakura. Lee and Tenten are attacked with explosive tags, directing them towards the same location. Sasori lands a hit on Sasuke, poisoning him. The Nine-Tails tries to convince Naruto to open the seal so it can use its chakra to aid Naruto. Jiraiya suddenly appears to Naruto.
438	25	"The Rules or a Comrade"; Transliteration: "Okite ka, Nakama ka" (Japanese: 掟か、仲間か)	Directed by : Kiyoshi Murayama; Storyboarded by : Yukihiro Matsushita	Junki Takegami & Yasuyuki Suzuki	Dae-Hoon Kim & Takayoshi Hayashi	November 19, 2015	May 7, 2023
Shizune brings Tsunade dinner, and is startled by Tsunade's outburst over Jiraiya's depiction of Sakura. Her dinner is too salty, and her beverage is too hot, so Tsunade resumes reading. The masked man prevents Neji from coming to Sasuke and Sakura's aid, assuring him he won't let them be killed, insisting Neji watch the battle to witness their true selves. The masked man reminds Sasori of the mission and Sasori begins attacking Sakura, who manages to dodge and land one of her own, causing him to retreat. She proceeds to treat Sasuke, removing the poison in his system. The masked man tells Neji there is more to come. Jiraiya clears Naruto's blocked tenketsu and Naruto asks him why he's there. He explains he's searching for someone and when he heard of what was happening, he had Minato transport him there using the sealing formula incorporated in Naruto's seal. Jiraiya tells Naruto to try summoning a toad, but it fails. Jiraiya recalls Naruto's training and Naruto recalls training with Minato. Jiraiya offers to weaken the Eight Trigrams Sealing Style a bit. Lee and Tenten stop running after noticing they're no longer under attack. They're met by Teams Asuma and Kurenai and update them on what has happened with Neji and Naruto. Kiba smells Sasuke and Sakura nearby, and Hinata spots Sasori near them. While Sakura heals him, Sasuke thinks back to his childhood. Sasuke looked forward spending time with Itachi, but Itachi was summoned by Minato, so he suggests Sasuke spend time with their father, who compares him unfavorably to Itachi when he tries the Fire Style: Fireball Jutsu for the first time. Sasuke detects Sasori, who approaches them again. Sasori brings out his hundred puppets. The other genin reach the two, and the masked man retreats with Neji. Sasuke intends on getting reinforcements from Konoha. Team Jiraiya watches from afar, discussing the situation. Jiraiya weakens Naruto's seal, causing him to develop Four-Tailed Fox.
439	26	"The Child of Prophecy"; Transliteration: "Yogen no Ko" (Japanese: 予言の子)	Directed by : Shinnosuke Imagawa; Storyboarded by : Toshihiko Masuda	Junki Takegami & Yasuyuki Suzuki	Shigeki Awai & Yusuke Adachi	November 26, 2015	May 14, 2023
Tsunade's reading is interrupted when her candle burns out. Shizune replaces it and asks her not to overdo it. Jiraiya battles the Four-Tailed Fox Naruto, who destroys Jiraiya's chakra-suppressing seal. Jiraiya manages to immobilize Naruto and thinks back to Gamamaru's prophecy. Sasuke thinks back to being unfavorably compared to Itachi by their father, and begins fighting Sasori's puppets. The other genin join the fight to protect Sasuke while Team Jiraiya observes the fight. The masked man and Neji debate on the genin's motivation to fight. Sasori reveals more of his puppets. Naruto thinks back to his Rasengan training with Minato, and manages to suppress the Nine-Tails's chakra. Jiraiya retreats, and sends Naruto to help his teammates. Naruto manages to use the Rasengan, and uses it with several clones to dispatch Sasori's puppets, causing him to retreat. The genin congratulate Naruto, and decide to look for their kidnapped team leaders. Neji asks the masked man if his test has yielded the results he expected, and surprises him by calling him his father.
440	27	"The Caged Bird"; Transliteration: "Kago no Tori" (Japanese: 籠の鳥)	Kazunori Mizuno	Junki Takegami	Zenjirou Ukulele, Mariko Emori & Retsu Okawara	December 3, 2015	May 21, 2023
Tsunade reads on, and is surprised when Neji calls the masked man his father. Shizune arrives with alcohol for Tsunade, who drinks up and resumes reading. Neji asks about the kidnapped shinobi, and the masked man tells him Team Jiraiya will take him there. The masked man leaves Neji to reunite with his comrades. The Konoha genin join as one team, and discuss how to find the kidnapped shinobi. They're joined by Neji. The masked man appears to Team Jiraiya, Hidan, Kakuzu, and Sasori, telling them the test is over. Hidan, Kakuzu, and Sasori leave, while the others are instructed to take the evacuated villagers back to their homes, as well as one other thing. Neji finishes explaining the nature of the experiment they participated in. Konan creates paper butterflies to lead the genin to the captured shinobi, and leaves with her team. The genin find the captured shinobi and release them. Kurenai asks them about the recent events, and the masked man arrives, offering to explain it himself. He removes his mask and bandages, revealing himself as a reincarnated Hizashi Hyūga. Neji explains the Hyūga Affair, and Hizashi explains how he was reincarnated by a bandaged man, and orchestrated the incident to ascertain if his death had effects on how Konohagakure handles its affairs. Hizashi and Neji discuss Neji's motivations, and how there were changed after fighting Naruto. Neji's words allow Hizashi to let go of his attachments, and his soul is released. Yahiko sets off to the village to return Komichi his teddy bear Kenta. An explosion suddenly wipes out the village, and Nagato spots Kenta damaged, and grows furious, believing Yahiko to have been killed.
441	28	"Returning Home"; Transliteration: "Kikan" (Japanese: 帰還)	Directed by : Toshihiro Maeya; Storyboarded by : Yukihiro Matsushita	Yuka Miyata	Min-Seop Shin & Yūko Ishizaki	December 10, 2015	June 4, 2023
In the morning, Tsunade complains about the bad ending to Jiraiya's novel. Shizune brings her breakfast. Tsunade begins reading the second volume of Jiraiya's novel. In it, the four Konoha genin teams report to Minato. Despite having disobeyed direct orders, doing so resulted in the mission's success, so there are no repercussions. They discuss this among themselves. In the hospital, Jiraiya recovers from the injuries inflicted by Naruto when the Nine-Tails's chakra took over. He recounts finding Orochimaru, and discovering evidence linking him to the latest incident. Fugaku berates Sasuke for failing to stop his teammates from breaking the rules. Itachi arrives to deliver a report to Fugaku, so Sasuke leaves. At Yakiniku Q, the other genin discuss the explosion at the other village. Itachi and Sasuke discuss their father, and the recent negotiations between the Uchiha and the village. Sasuke requests Kakashi to teach him a new jutsu, so Kakashi begins teaching him the Chidori. Itachi learns from Minato he intends to keep his promises to the Uchiha clan. Sasuke witnesses Naruto being taught the Giant Rasengan by Minato. Fugaku dismisses Sasuke and is unimpressed by his training. Sasuke learns the Chidori, but knowing that Naruto is expanding his Rasengan, he asks Kakashi how much further he can take the Chidori.
442	29	"The Mutual Path"; Transliteration: "Tagai no Michi" (Japanese: 互いの道)	Maki Odaira	Yuka Miyata	Masaya Onishi, Yūri Ichinose & Daisuke Tsumagari	December 17, 2015	June 11, 2023
Sasuke wonders about his proficiency with the Chidori and considers asking Fugaku, but he tells him he's busy. Itachi invites Sasuke to participate in a discussion with their father. Fugaku questions Itachi, who reports he believes Minato's efforts in changing the way the Uchiha are treated are sincere. Itachi adds that for it to happen, the Uchiha must change as well, meeting them in the middle. Sasuke is appalled by Itachi's comment, but is cut off by Fugaku, who is certain Itachi came to that conclusion after careful consideration, and considers finding common ground a good decision. Sasuke resents Fugaku always siding with Itachi. Itachi reveals the Uchiha have been chosen for a long-term mission that would keep some of them away. Fugaku's support for Itachi taking on the mission angers Sasuke, who channels his frustration into his Chidori training. Sakura brings him food, but an enraged Sasuke tosses it aside, causing Naruto to request him to apologize. Sasuke further antagonizes Naruto, and the two begin fighting, despite Sakura's attempts to defuse the situation. Minato intervenes just as they are about to clash Chidori and Rasengan. Minato is taken aback by Sasuke's anger, which only grows stronger when he sees the destruction caused by Naruto's Rasengan is much greater than what he has achieved with the Chidori. Minato asks Naruto why he used the Rasengan against Sasuke, and Naruto explains Sasuke's constant refusal in acknowledging him, vowing to make it happen someday. Sasuke and Fugaku talk in discuses, and Sasuke decides to no longer expect anything from his hated father, and asks something from him. Sasuke requests to be taken off Team 7, is transferred to the Leaf Police Force, and leaves to shadow other Uchiha on their long-term mission. Jiraiya makes Naruto realize that Sasuke's request means that in some way, he is aware of Naruto's strength. Jiraiya intends to leave to find out more about Orochimaru, and Naruto suggests going with him to train. With Team 7 split up, Sakura, unwilling to lag behind Naruto and Sasuke, takes up the opportunity and requests to be trained by Tsunade who accepts. On the move, Shisui questions Sasuke's resolve in joining the mission, when everyone else is ranked above him and Sasuke explains his motivation. Kushina, Minato, Sakura, and Team 10 go see Naruto and Jiraiya off. Orochimaru and Danzō meet to discuss who is to blame for the failure of the plan involving Hizashi, that was supposed to take out a large amount of pro-Minato shinobi. Danzō is to select a future vessel for Orochimaru. Three years go by, during which Naruto trains with Jiraiya and learns senjutsu, Sasuke trains with Shisui and further develops the Chidori, and Sakura trains with Tsunade to learn the Reverse Seal. Upon his return to the village, Fugaku learns from the reports Sasuke became second only to Shisui, and when Sasuke declares he will also surpass Itachi, he promotes him in the Leaf Police Force, to see it Sasuke can back his claims up with action. Sasuke accepts, and leaves, angrily remembering the day he left Konoha.
443	30	"The Difference in Power"; Transliteration: "Chikara no Sa" (Japanese: 力の差)	Directed by : Yasuhiro Akamatsu; Storyboarded by : Yukihiro Matsushita	Yuka Miyata	Naoki Takahashi, Shinichi Suzuki & Asuka Tsubuki	December 24, 2015	June 18, 2023
Sasuke's Leaf Police Force unit defeats a gang of thieves and beats them up. The unit takes them through Konoha, where the population is scared by their aggressive methods. Sasuke and the other Uchiha discuss their jobs and the relations with the village. Minato, Hiruzen, and Itachi discuss the group's escalating violence in their duties, agreeing they must tread carefully. Chōji, Ino, Sakura, and Shikamaru observe a now deserted street over the police's tight regulations, where there used to be many food carts. A recently arrived Naruto observes the same. The four update Naruto on how things have changed. The Uchiha harass an elderly shopkeeper, but Naruto intervenes. Sasuke senses something different with Naruto, but before their fight escalates, they're stopped by Danzō. Naruto and the others leave with the shopkeeper, and Danzō asks Sasuke for how long he'll hold himself down. Danzō is observed by Kakashi. Naruto and the others discuss curbing Sasuke's overreach, and are overheard by the other Uchiha, who inform Sasuke. The villagers gossip about the police's run-in with Naruto, and, unauthorized, they look to confront Naruto at his home and also threatening to arrest Kushina. The Uchiha involved are arrested, Fugaku expresses his disappointment in Sasuke's development, and dismisses him from the police force. Wanting for power, Sasuke visits Danzō, who suggests he train with Orochimaru and leaves the village.
444	31	"Leaving the Village"; Transliteration: "Sato Nuke" (Japanese: 里抜け)	Directed by : Kazuya Iwata; Storyboarded by : Yukihiro Matsushita	Yasuyuki Suzuki	Hiroyuki Yamashita	January 14, 2016	June 25, 2023
Sasuke knocks Izumo and Kotetsu out on his way out of Konoha. He is intercepted by Kakashi, who asks what he is doing. Sasuke thanks him for his training, but explains he is unsatisfied with his progress, revealing he is going to train with Orochimaru, and incapacitates Kakashi with genjutsu. Upon waking up, Kakashi relays the information to Hiruzen, Minato, and Tsunade, herself informing the others about Jiraiya's intel regarding Orochimaru's imminent need for a new vessel. Sakura overhears their conversation. Minato wants to handle the situation internally as discreetly as possible, to avoid worsening the already delicate situation with the Uchiha, and orders a lockdown. The Konoha 11 meet up at the Academy at night, where Sakura and Shikamaru informs the others about Sasuke's departure. Naruto and Shikamaru sneak out of the village through a tunnel created by Kiba, and Naruto promises Sakura to bring Sasuke back. Neji notices someone else sneaking out as well. Kushina informs Minato that Naruto and Shikamaru have escaped the lockdown. Naruto and Shikamaru are attacked by Root Anbu sent by Danzō to ensure no one interferes with Sasuke reaching Orochimaru. Team Guy intercepts the attack. As the fight goes on, Shikamaru realizes these are not regular Anbu. Sasuke continues on his way to Orochimaru.
445	32	"Pursuers"; Transliteration: "Otte" (Japanese: 追手)	Directed by : Ayataka Tanemura; Storyboarded by : Sumio Watabane	Junki Takegami & Yasuyuki Suzuki	Eiichi Tokura & Tetsurō Taira	January 21, 2016	July 9, 2023
A group of Sand shinobi have lost track of their target. From above, Deidara flies on his dragon, and sends one of his clay figures their way, killing them. Zetsu watches it from afar, and its halves discuss Deidara, who arrives shortly. They are met by Hidan, who berates Deidara for blasting the Sand shinobi, and Kakuzu, who manages to retrieve a body not too damaged. They all leave together. Naruto manages to unmask the Root member fighting him, revealing her to be Anko. Shikamaru realizes their mission is to ensure Sasuke reaches Orochimaru, and has the group flee from the fight and continue pursuing Sasuke. Lee stays behind to stall the Root shinobi, but one of them engages him, allowing the others to continue. Lee takes off his weights and opens the fifth of the Eight Gates. Kakuzu delivers the corpses to a bounty station. Zetsu, Deidara, Kakuzu, and Hidan meet up with Sasori, who intervenes when an argument begins between Deidara and Hidan. Hidan accuses Sasori of siding with Deidara, and in turn is reminded of the Hizashi incident, and that Akatsuki as is might exist because of Deidara. He was the one responsible for the explosion that destroyed the village and killed Yahiko years ago, and Sasori presented Nagato and Konan with a Flying Raijin Kunai, blaming Minato and Konoha for the explosion. In Ame, Nagato vows to make Konoha know his pain, through the Deva Path, using Yahiko's body. Lee fights the Root shinobi, and Tenten stays behind to stall another when they begin to catch up with the group. Orochimaru waits for an approaching Sasuke. Naruto, Neji, and Shikamaru continue to give chase, followed by two remaining Root shinobi.
446	33	"Collision"; Transliteration: "Shōtotsu" (Japanese: 衝突)	Masayuki Yamada	Yasuyuki Suzuki	Kumiko Horikoshi	January 28, 2016	July 16, 2023
Naruto and Shikamaru follow onto the tower to find Sasuke, while Neji stays behind to prevent the two remaining Root Anbu from following them. Anko reveals she is accompanied by an ink clone, while the other Anbu flies above them on an ink bird. Neji fights Anko. Shikamaru stays at the tower's entrance to fight Sai. Sasuke meets up with Orochimaru. On his way up the tower, Naruto is captured by Yamato. Naruto taps into the Nine-Tails's power, freeing himself and growing four tails. Yamato tried to stop him, but his jutsu fails, and Naruto begins growing a fifth tail. Sasuke demands power from Orochimaru, and screams in pain when he is branded with the Cursed Seal of Heaven. His screams snaps Naruto out of his transformation, whose chakra knocks Yamato out. Naruto reaches Sasuke, and after a few words the two begin fighting. Naruto gathers natural energy from a shadow clone he prepared and enters Sage Mode, which catches Orochimaru's eye, despite expiring soon. Sasuke sends a Fire Release jutsu up in the sky, setting up a thunderstorm. Sasuke uses Kirin against Naruto's Rasenshuriken. Sasuke lands a blow on Naruto, who explains why he's going so far to bring Sasuke back. Naruto again channels the Nine-Tails's chakra. Itachi suddenly appears and throws himself into Sasuke's attack, getting killed in the process. Sasuke walks away from the battlefield having awakened the Mangekyō Sharingan.
447	34	"Another Moon"; Transliteration: "Mōhitotsu no Tsuki" (Japanese: もう一つの月)	Directed by : Toshihiro Maeya; Storyboarded by : Yukihiro Matsushita	Junki Takegami & Yasuyuki Suzuki	Yūko Ishizaki, Min-Seop Shin, Jung-Duk Seo & Hyung-Shik Shin	February 4, 2016	July 23, 2023
Naruto wakes up and is told by Shikamaru that Sasuke is nowhere to be found, and that the Anbu they were fighting retreated. While Tsunade updates Minato on the shinobi Sasuke attacked when he left the village, Shizune arrives with news someone infiltrated the village. Pain arrives and talks to Tsunade, vowing to cause the village pain. Pain attacks the village with a gigantic Chibaku Tensei. Naruto and the others arrive in the morning to find a crater where Konohagakure was supposed to be, with the Chibaku Tensei floating above it. Neji confirms the chakra of the villagers is inside it with his Byakugan. Naruto meets up with Sakura, who was away on a mission and is also puzzled by what happened. Sakura begins healing Naruto's injuries, and Naruto uses the time to mold sage chakra. Inside the Chibaku Tensei, Minato discovers he can't teleport outside. The Chibaku Tensei begins compacting, and Shikaku and Inoichi begin coordinating a strategy to protect the village from being crushed. Minato asks Hiruzen, Tsunade, and Kushina to help him setting up a Four Crimson Ray Formation to counter the crushing and buy them some time. The Six Paths of Pain meet up with Naruto, who releases a shadow clone, and enters Sage Mode, and they begin fighting. Naruto manages to take out five of the six, but is pinned down by the Deva Path. Hinata comes to his rescue, but is struck down by Pain, causing Naruto to grow six tails. Pain traps Naruto inside another Chibaku Tensei.
448	35	"Comrade"; Transliteration: "Nakama" (Japanese: 仲間)	Directed by : Kiyoshi Murayama; Storyboarded by : Toshihiko Masuda	Yasuyuki Suzuki	Seung Hee Yoo & Aya Tanaka	February 11, 2016	July 30, 2023
Lee observes Pain from afar. Sakura treats Hinata's injury. Shikamaru looks up to the True: Chibaku Tensei technique. In his mind, Naruto grows angry, and demands the fox to give him more chakra, who cautions him that he can still not control its power. Kushina feels something is wrong with Naruto because the Nine-Tails's chakra in her is disturbed. Minato has Ino contact those outside, and Shikamaru updates them on what is happening outside. Hearing about Naruto, Kushina decides to take a drastic measure. She manages to contact him in his mind. She intends to pass on her Nine-Tails entirely to Naruto, but the Nine-Tails in Naruto assures her it won't be necessary. She passes a portion of the chakra to Naruto, who manages to break through the Chibaku Tensei and defeat Pain. Naruto tracks Nagato down, whose words remind Nagato of Yahiko, convincing him to release Konoha. Minato and Fugaku discuss Sasuke and Itachi. Sasuke attacks Orochimaru, but collapses from being poisoned. Sasuke wakes up and is approached by Sasori, who offers him Akatsuki's help in achieving his goals. Sasuke wants to destroy Konoha.
449	36	"The Shinobi Unite"; Transliteration: "Shinobitachi no Kyōen" (Japanese: 忍達の共演)	Directed by : Takeyuki Yanase; Storyboarded by : Yukihiro Matsushita	Junki Takegami	Shigeki Awai & Yusuke Adachi	February 18, 2016	August 6, 2023
Tsunade informs Konoha 11 of Sasuke killing Orochimaru and suspicions of him joining the Akatsuki. They head to search for him while Sasori reveals a mass of puppets to rule the world. Sasuke questions his decision to destroy the village. Itachi appears alive to help his younger brother realize the wrong path he is walking. When Konoha 11 fight Sasori and the other Akatsuki members, Sasuke joins with his former comrades. Minato and shinobi from the other hidden villages arrive to help seal away the puppets. Sasori uses puppets of the Raikage, Mizukage, and Tsuchikage to fight Naruto, Sasuke, and Sakura. Jiraiya arrives with Nagato and Konan, telling Naruto he will be the new member of Team Jiraiya. Itachi comes to assist Sasuke and defeat the Kage puppets. Naruto and Sasuke combine their powers to destroy Sasori. Afterwards, Naruto asks Sasuke to return home and he agrees but says he will change the world in his own way.
450	37	"Rival"; Transliteration: "Raibaru" (Japanese: 好敵手(ライバル))	Kazunori Mizuno	Yasuyuki Suzuki	Megumi Tomita, Daisuke Tsumagari & Zenjirou Ukulele	February 25, 2016	August 13, 2023
Sasuke agrees to return to Konoha, but denies being comrades with the others again, intent on changing how the village works. Naruto and Sasuke fight on Orochimaru's old hide out, arguing about the past, Sasuke accusing Naruto of advancing too fast, leaving him behind. After the final fight, Naruto and Sasuke make up and return to Konoha. Tsunade wakes up from having fallen asleep reading Jiraiya's novel when Dan calls her. In the real world, Tsunade mumbles in her sleep, as she and countless others are trapped in the Infinite Tsukuyomi.
Itachi Shinden: Book of Light and Darkness
451	38	"Birth and Death"; Transliteration: "Umareru Inochi, Shinu Inochi" (Japanese: 生まれる命、死ぬ命)	Directed by : Kazuya Iwata; Storyboarded by : Shinji Satō	Katsuhiko Chiba	Retsu Okawara & Masaya Onishi	March 3, 2016	August 20, 2023
Naruto tries leaving Sasuke's Susanoo, but Sasuke stops him, telling Naruto he will also be caught in the Infinite Tsukuyomi. Minato sees Konoha under the Infinite Tsukuyomi, the other great shinobi villages also under it. Tobirama unsuccessfully tries to free Orochimaru's team from the roots of the God Tree. Black Zetsu notices Sasuke's Susanoo. Sakura asks Sasuke about what is happening outside, but he shuts her down. Kakashi tries speaking up, but is shut down as well. Naruto berates Sasuke. Sasuke explains they are likely the only ones not caught by the Infinite Tsukuyomi. Several shinobi's dreams are shown. Sasuke explains that as long as the light of the Infinite Tsukuyomi shines, it is pointless trying to do anything. Telling himself that Madara has no right to speak about the Uchiha, he recalls his memories of Itachi that imparts with him when the Reanimation Jutsu was cancelled. In his past, after the young Itachi witnesses the horrors of war, an Iwagakure ninja sees and asks Itachi for water. Before the ninja attacks him, Itachi slashes his throat, and asks Fugaku why the ninja tried to kill him. Fugaku explains to Itachi what war is. The Uchiha discreetly discuss Kakashi having a Sharingan during a service for those who died in the war. Itachi and Orochimaru briefly discuss the meaning of life and death. Itachi jumps off a cliff, but upon noticing a crow, he slows his descent with kunai, and befriends the crows. Mikoto tells Itachi that his younger brother, Sasuke was born. Itachi passes up playing with other boys to train with shuriken. The boys throw stones at him, but Itachi effortlessly dodges them, and uses one of their own stones to deflect the others. Itachi watches Sasuke at night, and feels an ominous wind.
452	39	"The Genius"; Transliteration: "Isai" (Japanese: 異才)	Directed by : Norihiko Nagahama; Storyboarded by : Shinji Satō	Katsuhiko Chiba	Naoki Takahashi, Shinichi Suzuki & Yūko Fuji	March 10, 2016	September 10, 2023
Obito watches Konoha and teleports away. Itachi feels an ominous wind as Obito summons the Nine-Tails. Obito has the Nine-Tails attack the village, and Itachi protects Sasuke during the attack. Itachi comes across Izumi during the attack and helps her get to a shelter. Konoha manages to subdue the Nine-Tails. Itachi attends the funeral of those who died during the attack. Izumi thanks Itachi for helping her. Danzō oversees the rebuilding of the village, and moves clan settlements around, including pushing the Uchiha to the edge of Konoha. The Uchiha are displeased with the decision, but can't be the only voice of dissension, as other clans were also relocated. Itachi asks Fugaku to see the new Uchiha training grounds, and asks him to teach him jutsu. Itachi effortlessly learns Fire Style: Fireball Justu. Itachi notices Fugaku's discomfort with the neighbouring buildings around the new Uchiha clan settlements. Itachi and Izumi begin at the Academy. Itachi excels at it, and asks Fugaku to teach him more jutsu, as he deems the ones taught in the Academy too easy. Itachi's prowess has affords him admiration by girls, and jealousy from some boys. The boys run into an older student, who takes issue with their attitude. The boys cower behind Itachi, who beats the older student when he attacks. The boys' jealousy turns into admiration, much to Itachi's discomfort. Itachi wonders about what it means to be a shinobi, and about the village. He learns from Shisui during Academy hours, and sends in a shadow clone to attend the Academy. The shadow clone is defeated by older students when they target him and other students from his class. Itachi's teachers are impressed by him knowing it, and offer him an early graduation. Itachi graduates, and can begin acting as part of a team and going on missions.
453	40	"The Pain of Living"; Transliteration: "Inochi no Itami" (Japanese: 命の痛み)	Maki Odaira	Masahiro Hikokubo	Yūri Ichinose & Chiyuki Tanaka	March 17, 2016	September 17, 2023
Itachi plays with Sasuke, and thinks back to one of his missions. Itachi sees his father after returning from a mission. They talk about how the Uchiha were relocated after the Nine-Tails' attack. Itachi points out Fugaku is still the face of the Uchiha, many of whom greet them as they walk, and that he is proud to walk with him. Itachi and Fugaku go get dumplings, but the store is sold out. They run into Izumi. She and Itachi go to a lake, where Izumi apologizes for not giving him anything for his promotion. Itachi tells her not to worry, but she insists on sharing her dumplings with him. Tenma arrives and informs Itachi they have a mission. Team 2 visits Nekobaa, who has tasked them with finding a ninja cat. The team splits up to look for the cat. Tenma is personally invested in completing the mission, as the cat's whiskers are an ingredient for a medicine for his sick father. Yūki approaches the cat, but he scratches him. Itachi's team-mates are also incapacitated. Itachi manages to catch the cat, and save Tenma when he tries to acquire the cat's whiskers. On their way back to Konoha, Shinko scolds Tenma for not thanking Itachi, and Itachi for just acting as if they were only on a mission, as they are friends. Itachi, thinking back to this moment, recalls when a masked man (Obito) killed Tenma in one of their missions. The pain of those memories awakens Itachi's Sharingan, which Sasuke notices. Itachi wonders if one day Sasuke will also awaken the Sharingan.
454	41	"Shisui's Request"; Transliteration: "Shisui no Irai" (Japanese: シスイの依頼)	Directed by : Yūsuke Onoda; Storyboarded by : Yoshihiro Sugai	Masahiro Hikokubo	Tetsurō Taira, Eiichi Tokura & Masako Miura	March 24, 2016	September 17, 2023
Fugaku feeds the fish in the Uchiha compound, and talks to Itachi about the Sharingan as he leaves. Itachi is angry that Fugaku does not care that Tenma died, but hides it. Sasuke wants to play with Itachi, but he has a mission. Shisui tells Sasuke he has to borrow Itachi. Itachi accompanies Shisui in a three-part training exercise. The two track a fugitive during the day, noticing decoys left along the way. At night, the two eat and talk. Tenma's death continues to weight on Itachi. He tells Shisui he awakened the Sharingan. The two hear a fight, and arrive to find Root members attacking a Konoha Anbu, for a scroll containing information about a traitor. The attacked Anbu, a water clone, dissolves. The Root members remain unconcerned, having poisoned the real one. Shisui and Itachi fight the three Root members. Itachi turns a trap one of the Root Anbu set against herself. Shisui defeats one of the other Root members, who retreats with the other two. Shisui receives a signal that his exercise is over. The injured Anbu wants to keep the incident a secret. Shisui's superiors are glad that no one got hurt, despite the fight not being a part of the exercise. Shisui tends to a small injury of Itachi's, who still needs to get used to delay between his Sharingan's perception and his reaction time. Shisui takes Itachi back to the Uchiha compound, and the two talk about the events of the day. Years later, Itachi joins the Anbu to watch Konaha from the shadows.
455	42	"Moonlit Night"; Transliteration: "Tsukiyo" (Japanese: 月夜)	Masahiko Murata	Katsuhiko Chiba	Masahiko Murata	April 7, 2016	September 24, 2023
Team 7 continues to wait for the light of the Infinite Tsukuyomi to subside. Sasuke continues to ponder about Itachi's memories. In them, Fugaku congratulates Itachi on becoming an Anbu, but reminds him that his loyalty is first and foremost to the clan. Shisui entrusts Itachi with his remaining eye, and commits suicide, awakening Itachi's Mangekyō Sharingan. Itachi beats up Inabi, Yashiro, and Tekka, when they accuse him of having killed Shisui. Fugaku questions what is happening, and Sasuke asks Itachi to stop. Itachi feigns regret, looking at Sasuke with his Mangekyō Sharingan, hoping Sasuke will realize how shallow the clan is. Itachi is promoted to Anbu captain, and thought not joining Root, he is to report to Danzō, who places subordinates under him, and tasks him with an assassination. Upon returning from his mission, Danzō asks Itachi his opinion on the Uchiha, and Itachi shares their growing resentment of the village can no longer be ignored. Fugaku orders Itachi to meet him alone after a clan meeting. Fugaku shows Itachi the Stone Tablet in the Naka Shrine, telling him his Mangekyō Sharingan should be able to decipher more of it than the Sharingan. Itachi asks if Fugaku wants him to read it for him. Fugaku reveals his own Mangekyō Sharingan, having awakened it during the Third Shinobi World War, when a comrade sacrificed himself to save him. Fugaku and Itachi discuss the clan's situation and wishes, which include Fugaku becoming Hokage. Fugaku has kept his Mangekyō Sharingan a secret from others, certain that if the Uchiha knew he could control the Nine-Tails, the conflict would escalate, and through genjutsu, shows Itachi what would happen. Fugaku wants to use Itachi's position as an Anbu to restrain the upper echelons of the village, so a coup can be bloodless. Itachi informs the higher-ups about the eminent coup. Despite Hiruzen's wish for diplomacy, Danzō gives Itachi an ultimatum regarding the assassination of the Uchiha. Itachi approaches Obito for help. Obito attacks the Uchiha at the police force, while Itachi attacks the ones at the compound. Izumi tries to attack Tobi, in vain. Itachi shows Fugaku his own vision of the future, who releases his shadow clone. Itachi anticipates a fight with Fugaku, but he and Mikoto just wait for him, exchange final words before Itachi tearfully kills them. Itachi makes his final report to Hiruzen, before going in to join the Akatsuki. On his way, he kills his previous Anbu subordinates when they try to kill him. In the Akatsuki, Itachi is partnered with Jūzō Biwa.
456	43	"The Darkness of the Akatsuki"; Transliteration: "Akatsuki no Yami" (Japanese: 暁の闇)	Directed by : Kiyoshi Murayama; Storyboarded by : Yukihiro Matsushita	Katsuhiko Chiba	Seung Hee Yoo & Aya Tanaka	April 14, 2016	September 24, 2023
Jūzō asks Itachi about Duy, and tells him how he single-handedly defeated four of the Seven Ninja Swordsmen of the Mist. Jūzō and Itachi briefly discuss their specialties. The two carry out an assassination. The Akatsuki gathers, and Pain fills the others in on the Akatsuki's progress and growing reputation. He informs them about the plan to gather the Tailed Beasts. Jūzō is given a mission in the Land of Water, to his displeasure. To prevent being taken by hunter-nin, Jūzō instructs Itachi to kill him if he is captured. The two complete their mission, but are pursued by Yagura and Kiri Anbu. Jūzō and Itachi fight them, taking out the Anbu, but Yagura channels Isobu's power. Yagura paralyses Itachi, but Jūzō frees him. Yagura aims a Tailed Beast Ball at them, which Jūzō blocks at the cost of his sword, part of which impales him. Itachi awakens the Amaterasu, leaving Yagura at the brink of death. Jūzō dies from his injury. At the next Akatsuki gathering, Kakuzu's partner is also revealed to have been killed, by Kakuzu himself. Orochimaru tries to attack Itachi to take over his body, but is defeated. Pain assigns Kisame to be Itachi's new partner.
457	44	"Partner"; Transliteration: "Aibō" (Japanese: 相棒)	Directed by : Shōgo Arai; Storyboarded by : Shinobu Tagashira	Katsuhiko Chiba	Shigeki Awai & Ruriko Watabane	April 21, 2016	October 1, 2023
Sasori, Itachi, and Kisame pay a visit to Deidara to recruit him on Pain's orders. Deidara is recruited into the Akatsuki, partnered with Sasori, and the two are ordered to kill Orochimaru, who escaped into the Land of Wind. Itachi and Kisame are given a mission in Kusagakure. Kakuzu asks about a replacement partner, Pain tells him to wait. Sasori collects intel on Orochimaru left to him by Kabuto. As they approach Orochimaru's hideout, Orochimaru's snakes detect them, and inform Orochimaru. Sasori orders Deidara to keep an eye from the sky so Orochimaru can't get away. Sasori brings out his Third Kazekage puppet, while Orochimaru reveals a reanimated Third Kazekage in his possession. The two fight and one of the attacks from the reanimated Third Kazekage damages Deidara's clay bird, causing him to retaliate. The Third Kazekage manages to free himself from Orochimaru's control, returning to the Pure Land. Sasori seizes the opportunity to attack, but Orochimaru retreats into his hideout and Deidara blows it up. On a gathering, Sasori informs Pain that Orochimaru is likely alive, as they were unable to find his corpse. Itachi fills them in about the Reanimation Jutsu. The Akatsuki receives a mission from the Land of Hot Water, to kill an apparent immortal. Kakuzu, Itachi, and Konan are sent on the mission. Konan goes in as a decoy, and as Hidan prepares to attack her, Itachi and Kakuzu reveal themselves. Hidan and Kakuzu fight with Kakuzu impressed by Hidan's immortality, and Hidan manages to destroy one of Kakuzu's hearts. Hidan is recruited into the Akatsuki and partnered with Kakuzu. Akatsuki learns about the recently founded Otogakure, and plans to check it out, suspecting Orochimaru's involvement in it. They also learn of the joint effort with Sunagakure to destroy Konohagakure, and of the Third Hokage's death. Itachi volunteers to evaluate the situation, covertly wondering about Sasuke's safety.
458	45	"Truth"; Transliteration: "Makoto" (Japanese: 真)	Masayuki Yamada	Katsuhiko Chiba	Kumiko Horikoshi	April 28, 2016	October 1, 2023
While carrying out the Akatsuki's mission, Itachi learns about Sasuke's state of being, as well as learning of Naruto's existence. He learns Sasuke has awakened his Sharingan, and learned Chidori from Kakashi. At a latter occasion, he questions Naruto about how he would measure the safety of the Land of Fire against Sasuke's. Sasuke finishes reminiscing on Itachi's memories. Meanwhile, back on the battlefield, the light of the Infinite Tsukuyomi fades and Sasuke dispels his Susanoo. Madara returns to the ground and gloats to the survivors, explaining why he believes Hashirama's dreams were flawed, but before he can do much more, Black Zetsu suddenly kills him by stabbing him through the heart. Madara's body then begins to swell and huge amounts of chakra are drawn to his location. Sasuke and Naruto attempt to stop the plan from succeeding, while Black Zetsu explains that he has been waiting for this moment for eons and that he is actually the will of Kaguya Ōtsutsuki. Black Zetsu also reveals that every human trapped in the Infinite Tsukuyomi will eventually turn into White Zetsu, forever loyal to Kaguya. Moments before he dies, Madara wonders why the tablet said the technique would end all wars in the world, only to realize in horror that Black Zetsu altered the Stone Tablet and has been manipulating everyone from the very beginning. Madara's body is then consumed and replaced by Kaguya, who exclaims her joy at finally being able to carry out her plan of exterminating all of humanity.

== Home media release ==
=== Japanese ===
Infinite Tsukuyomi: The Invocation
Volume	Date	Discs	Episodes	Reference
1	February 3, 2016	1	414–417	
2	March 2, 2016	1	418–421	
3	April 6, 2016	1	422–426	
4	May 11, 2016	1	427–431	

Jiraiya Shinobi Handbook: The Tale of Naruto the Hero
Volume	Date	Discs	Episodes	Reference
1	June 8, 2016	1	432–435	
2	July 6, 2016	1	436–439	
3	August 3, 2016	1	440–443	
4	September 7, 2016	1	444–447	
5	October 5, 2016	1	448–450	

Itachi's Story ~ Light and Darkness
Volume	Date	Discs	Episodes	Reference
1	November 2, 2016	1	451–454	
2	December 7, 2016	1	455–458	

=== English ===
Viz Media (North America – Region 1/A)
Box set	Date	Discs	Episodes	Reference
32	October 10, 2017	2	403–416	
33	January 9, 2018	2	417–430	
34	May 1, 2018	2	431–444	
35	August 28, 2018	2	445–458	

Manga Entertainment (United Kingdom and Ireland – Region 2/B)
Volume	Date	Discs	Episodes	Reference
32	May 21, 2018	2	402–415	
33	August 20, 2018	2	416–430	
34	November 19, 2018	2	431–444	
35	February 11, 2019	2	445–458	

Madman Entertainment (Australia and New Zealand – Region 4/B)
Collection	Date	Discs	Episodes	Reference
32	December 6, 2017	2	402–415	
33	March 7, 2018	2	416–430	
34	July 4, 2018	2	431–444	
35	November 1, 2018	2	445–458	
