= Naruto: Shippuden season 19 =

Naruto: Shippuden
- Season 19
- DVD cover for the Shippuden story arc titled In Naruto's Footsteps: Friends' Paths
- No. of episodes: 20

Release
- Original network: TV Tokyo
- Original release: January 8 – May 21, 2015

Season chronology
- ← Previous; Season 18 Next → Season 20

The nineteenth season of the anime television series Naruto: Shippuden is based on Part II of Masashi Kishimoto's Naruto manga series. The anime original season focuses on the Chūnin Exams that occur after Part I. The episodes are directed by Hayato Date, and produced by Pierrot and TV Tokyo. The nineteenth season aired from January to May 2015.

The season would make its English television debut on Adult Swim's Toonami programming block and aired from June 12 to October 9, 2022.

The season's collection in DVD started on September 2, 2015, under the title of In Naruto's Footsteps: Friends' Paths (ナルトの背中 ～仲間の軌跡～, Naruto no Senaka: Nakama no Kiseki).

The season contains four musical themes between two openings and two endings. The opening theme songs are "Silhouette" performed by Kana-Boon (used for episodes 394 to 405) and "Kaze" (風; "Wind") performed by Yamazaru (used for episodes 406 to 413). The ending theme songs are "Spinning World" performed by Diana Garnet (used for episodes 394 to 405) and "Kotoba no Iranai Yakusoku" (言葉のいらない約束; "A Promise That Needs No Words") performed by Sana (used for episodes 406 to 413).

== Episodes ==
No. overall	No. in season	Title	Directed by	Written by	Animation directed by	Original release date	English air date
In Naruto's Footsteps: Friends' Paths
394	1	"The New Chunin Exams"; Transliteration: "Aratanaru Chūnin Shiken" (Japanese: 新たなる中忍試験)	Directed by : Naoki Horiuchi; Storyboarded by : Yukihiro Matsushita	Junki Takegami	Naoki Takahashi & Shinichi Suzuki	January 8, 2015	June 12, 2022
While Sakura Haruno recovers Naruto Uzumaki, Tsunade recalls one of her memories about her, the new Kazekage Gaara and siblings starting the new Chunin Exams for some ninja students. After explaining that the Akatsuki will interfere the exam, they start the event for any conspirators who tries to start the coup d'état against them. After arranging the exams to first begin at the Leaf Village and end at the Sand, Tsunade sends out the ANBU to deliver invitations to all the Kages, but they refuse to have their villagers take part in the exams.
395	2	"The Chunin Exams Begin"; Transliteration: "Chūnin Shiken, Kaishi!" (Japanese: 中忍試験、開始!)	Directed by : Taisuke Mamoru; Storyboarded by : Toshihiko Masuda	Junki Takegami	Chiyuki Tanaka & Yoshihiro Maeda	January 15, 2015	June 19, 2022
At the Hidden Rain Village, Kakashi Hatake gives an invitation scroll to Hanzo. Though they kept secrets about his death, Konan tells Pain that the Leaf and Sand had started the exams, and sends Team Ajisai to attend. Shibuki asks seven-tailed Jinchuriki Fu at The Village Hidden in the Waterfall to conceal her identity. As Tsunade sees Hanzo's unusual reply and tells Shizune to keep tabs, Team Ajisai, Ameno, Fu, Kazami and Sajin arrive to visit the Leaf Village, and begin the first exam.
396	3	"The Three Questions"; Transliteration: "Mittsu no Mondai" (Japanese: 三つの問題)	Directed by : Kazuya Iwata; Storyboarded by : Sumio Watabane	Katsuhiko Chiba	Daiki Handa	January 22, 2015	June 19, 2022
While the team wait in line for the first exam, Konohamaru tells Neji that Naruto will not attend the new exams during training, while Ino, Choji, Sakura, Team 8 and Guy did. As hosts, Shikamaru and Temari tell both separated genins in three rooms that anyone who scores over 100 points on the 30 minute writing test will fail. As the genin at each room deduce the test, Sakura and Neji learn that each team can earn 100 points as max limit in order to pass the exam.
397	4	"One Worthy as a Leader"; Transliteration: "Rīdā ni Fusawashī Mono" (Japanese: リーダーに相応しい者)	Atsushi Nigorikawa	Katsuhiko Chiba	Kumiko Horikoshi	January 29, 2015	June 26, 2022
Not fighting at the first exam, Neji uses Byakugan on the wall to contact his friends and successfully pass the exam, before it ends. Homura and Koharu converse with Tsuande about Danzō, before Kankuro informs that they will look after Gaara. As the man sends a bird with the letter to the Sand, Shikamaru and Temari send all teams to race all the way there for the second exam.
398	5	"The Night Before the Second Exam"; Transliteration: "Niji Shiken, Zen'ya" (Japanese: 二次試験、前夜)	Directed by : Tsuneo Tominaga; Storyboarded by : Shinji Satō	Shin Yoshida	Min-Seop Shin & Yūko Ishizaki	February 5, 2015	June 26, 2022
One night, Temari defeats a self-destructing masked figure to save Kankuro. The next day, Gaara asks them to continue the second exam, while Asuma and Yuhi disqualify some Leaf Genin for with Fu attempting to make friends. Kakashi escapes from the Hidden Rain and tells Tsunade that he failed to capture Hanzo. Fu kills a giant scorpion to save Choji, Sakura and Ino. The next morning, the second exam begins with Temari instructing all teams to bring the Earth and Heaven scrolls to the center base.
399	6	"Demon Desert Survival"; Transliteration: "Ma no Sabaku no Sabaibaru" (Japanese: 魔の砂漠のサバイバル)	Directed by : Tokuji Kaneko; Storyboarded by : Shinji Satō	Shin Yoshida	Shiro Kudaka & Yūri Ichinose	February 12, 2015	July 10, 2022
Shira tells Sen and Yome that he fought with Gaara at the center base. As Asuma and Yuhi watch all genins heading into the Demon Desert. Tsunade assigns Guy to protect Gaara upon after knowing that the assassins will hunt him. Around the desert, Team Guy sets their strategy to counter their opponents, but senses an illusion and brakes free from the genjutsu. They confront and fight with the mysterious leader, Datsuji and Goji, but Team Shira arrives and leave after Team Goji with Team Guy trapped and escape from a quicksand. The united group fight with Team Shira for negotiating last night, before Team Guy arrive to drive off Goji and save Team Shira.
400	7	"As a Taijutsu User"; Transliteration: "Taijutsu Tsukai to shite..." (Japanese: 体術使いとして...)	Directed by : Kentarou Fujita; Storyboarded by : Toshihiko Masuda	Shin Yoshida	Yumenosuke Tokuda	February 19, 2015	July 10, 2022
While Team Guy and Shira converse each other and like Lee who trains to learn taijutsu hard, Shira abandoned the academy and does the same thing before Sen and Yome befriend him and Gaara trained Shira. Lee shortly leaves and confronts Team Goji before Neji and Tenten arrive to fight them, but Shira intervenes and gives the Earth scroll to Goji in exchange for the Heaven. As Team Goji trusts them and leaves, Lee challenges Shira to fight.
401	8	"The Ultimate"; Transliteration: "Kiwameshi mono" (Japanese: 極めし者)	Kazunori Mizuno	Shin Yoshida	Masaya Onishi, Zenjirou Ukulele & Hiromi Okazaki	February 26, 2015	July 17, 2022
While Lee fights with Shira, Neji learns that they sustain more damage. As Shira sets limit chakra points on Lee to prevent him from using the Inner Gates, Lee breaks the points and uses one of the gates and Shira activates the Seven Heavenly Breaths. Both boys fight until Lee uses the Fifth Gate to defeat Shira who thanks him. That evening as the guards inform that Fu, Kegon and Yoro are jonin, Gaara uses his Third Eye to spy on the team.
402	9	"Escape vs. Pursuit"; Transliteration: "Tōsō tai Tsuigeki" (Japanese: 逃走VS追跡)	Directed by : Tsuneo Tominaga; Storyboarded by : Yukihiro Matsushita	Yasuyuki Suzuki	Min-Seop Shin & Yūko Ishizaki	March 5, 2015	July 17, 2022
Team 8 is ambushed by the Hidden Grass's Team Kazami, who need the Earth Scroll. Kazami takes on Hinata while his team mates Burami and Muyami deal with Kiba and Shino. Once identifying Kiba as the holder of the Earth Scroll, Team Kazami lead a joint effort to successfully obtain the Earth Scroll with Burami using his unique Smell Sphere jutsu to immobilize them. But Team 8 manages to fight Burami's jutsu through sheer willpower as Muyami summons a giant mole named Moguranmaru that he and his team mates escape on. Shino managed to plant one of his kikaichū on Moguranmaru so he and his team can pursue Team Kazami. After surviving the quicksand trap. Team 8 continues to pursue Kazami with Kiba's sense of smell to track them down.
403	10	"Unwavering Gutsiness"; Transliteration: "Akiramenai Dokonjō" (Japanese: 諦めないド根性)	Directed by : Masayuki Yamada; Storyboarded by : Shinji Satō	Yasuyuki Suzuki	Kumiko Horikoshi	March 12, 2015	July 24, 2022
As Kazami, Burami and Muyami senses and erases the scent, Team 8 confronts to fight but failed to retrieve the scrolls from them at the middle of the desert. Team Kazami and the giant mole fails to trap Team 8 in the quicksand, after Akamaru pees on the sand to stop it. Team 8 defeats Team Kazami to retrieve both scrolls.
404	11	"Tenten's Troubles"; Transliteration: "Tenten no Nayami" (Japanese: テンテンの悩み)	Directed by : Akira Shimizu; Storyboarded by : Toshihiko Masuda	Katsuhiko Chiba	Naoki Takahashi & Shinichi Suzuki	March 19, 2015	July 31, 2022
Team Ajisai flees from Komugi's, while capturing the Jinchuriki to get Intel on others. That night while having dinner with Lee and Neji, Tenten walks off to recall her training memories. The next morning after arriving at the ruined temple and fighting each other, Lee accidentally brakes the giant tiles and the exploding bomb cause Tenten and Ajisai to fall into the underground. As Tenten recalls about her, Guy and Kakashi, she recovers and offers water to Ajisai.
405	12	"The Imprisoned Pair"; Transliteration: "Tojikomerareta Futari" (Japanese: 閉じ込められた二人)	Atsushi Nigorikawa	Katsuhiko Chiba	Yūri Ichinose, Shiro Kudaka & Masaya Onishi	March 26, 2015	August 7, 2022
As the rest ceasefire and enter the ruins, Tenten negotiates with Ajisai while returning to the surface. They escape from the giant ant who leads them to the nest. While both teams fight against the ants, Ajisai and her panda fail to break the wall, but Tenten summons a big amount of water to destroy it and drown the ants. Team Guy, Ajisai, Fuyo and Suiren apologize and part ways.
406	13	"The Place Where I Belong"; Transliteration: "Jibun no Ibasho" (Japanese: 自分の居場所)	Directed by : Fukutarou Hattori & Kazuya Iwata; Storyboarded by : Sumio Watabane	Masahiro Hikokubo	Tetsurō Taira & Masako Miura	April 2, 2015	August 14, 2022
As Sakura punches to kill the giant scorpion, she, Ino and Choji recalls their memory about their lives after the events of Part I. Skipping her father's training, Ino asks Tsunade to learn medical abilities like Sakura. She successfully does after reviving the octopus within three months. Back in the present day, Team Ameno use Hexagram Seal to sense that Sakura's group are moving forward.
407	14	"The Yamanaka Clan: Secret Ninjutsu"; Transliteration: "Yamanaka Ichizoku・Hiden Ninjutsu" (Japanese: 山中一族・秘伝忍術)	Tokuji Kaneko	Masahiro Hikokubo	Zenjirou Ukulele, Anna Yamaguchi, Masaya Onishi & Kumiko Horikoshi	April 9, 2015	August 21, 2022
As both teams confront to fight each other, Ameno cloaks Kōji and Shishio, but Sakura and Choji counters them. Ino using mind sensing art to allow Sakura and Choji to defeat Team Ameno. At the oasis, Team Ameno heals Sakura, Ino and Choji while they keep two scrolls. Both teams part ways with promises to meet in the next round.
408	15	"The Cursed Puppet"; Transliteration: "Noroi no Ningyō" (Japanese: 呪いの人形)	Directed by : Tsuneo Tominaga; Storyboarded by : Shinji Satō	Hideto Tanaka & Yuka Miyata	Min-Seop Shin & Yūko Ishizaki	April 16, 2015	August 28, 2022
As the group take an alternate route, Sakura had once used the Strength of a Hundred Seal and they confront to fight with Saya, Mamushi and Sana. At first, Saya uses Puppet Imitation Jutsu to possess Choji into attacking his friends. Ino uses Mind Transferring Jutsu to force Saya out of Choji's mind. As Karin uses Adamantine Attacking Chains to capture Suigetsu who is sent back to Orochimaru's hideout, Sakura recovers her chakra.
409	16	"Their Backs"; Transliteration: "Futari no Senaka" (Japanese: 二人の背中)	Directed by : Yoshinori Odaka; Storyboarded by : Shinji Satō	Hideto Tanaka & Yuka Miyata	Kumiko Horikoshi	April 23, 2015	September 4, 2022
While Sakura and Ino recovers, Choji resists against Saya and damages her puppet body. The real Saya inside the doll, Mamushi and Sana swear revenge against Sakura, Ino and Choji. Later, Jiraiya watches Gerotora weakening the seal and Naruto resisting the Nine-Tails' chakra. Sana traps Sakura, Ino and Choji with the Sand Storm Jutsu and Mamushi attacks Ino and Choji, before Sakura replenishes her chakra and sends Team Saya off in one punching blow. Sakura removes the poison from Ino and Choji.
410	17	"The Hidden Plot Set Into Motion"; Transliteration: "Ugokidashita Inbō" (Japanese: 動き出した陰謀)	Kentarō Fujita	Junki Takegami	Yumenosuke Tokuda & Yusuke Adachi	April 30, 2015	September 11, 2022
Gaara's Third Eye observes the event about Team Fu discussing each other and Team Matsuri planning to get the scroll. As Fugi and Hōichi plan to seal Shukaku in a tea kettle from Gaara, Fugi summons the sandstorm to engulf everyone that the siblings and other genin take shelter. As the headquarters notice the storm and the guards find Gaara's sand clone at the office, Matsuri, Yukata and Mikoshi fall into the quicksand. Overhearing and rushing to rescue them, Fu recalls her past friendship with Shibuki and uses Blue Joro Spider to save them before Gaara tells her about Naruto. Fu keeps the earth scroll and leaves before Hōichi confronts Gaara.
411	18	"The Targeted Tailed Beast"; Transliteration: "Nerawareta Bijū" (Japanese: 狙われた尾獣)	Directed by : Masayuki Yamada; Storyboarded by : Toshihiko Masuda	Junki Takegami	Mifumi Tomita, Tokuyuki Matsutake & Itsuko Takeda	May 7, 2015	September 25, 2022
Asuma, Yuhi and Guy observe the sandstorm and ignore the sand ninjas under jurisdiction. While the sandstorm subsides, the siblings and all genin escape to safety. Hōichi nearly manipulates the shadows of Team Matsuri with the biwa and captures Gaara with the sealing chains to pull Shukaku out from him and Chomei from Fu for arriving. Matsuri informs Team Guy that Hōichi is extracting the tailed beasts from Fu and Gaara.
412	19	"Neji's Judgment"; Transliteration: "Neji no Handan" (Japanese: ネジの判断)	Directed by : Tsuneo Tominaga; Storyboarded by : Toshihiko Masuda	Junki Takegami	Min-Seop Shin & Yūko Ishizaki	May 14, 2015	October 2, 2022
As Team Matsuri gives two heaven scrolls to Team Guy and work together, Yuhi, Asuma and Guy notice that Gaara and Fu are trapped in Hoichi's chains. As Fu creates the protective cocoon on her and Gaara with chakra threads to suppress absorption, Lee, Matsuri, Yoro and Kegon failed to damage Hōichi's Dharma Barrier: Celestial Pillars. Neji cuts to open the cocoon with Tenten's chakra sword and uses Gentle Fist: Chakra Point Needle to make the chains go haywire and transforming into a black line marks that ties Hōichi. Not before Neji saves Hōichi, Fu thanks and asks them to be friends.
413	20	"Hopes Entrusted to the Future"; Transliteration: "Mirai ni Takusu Omoi" (Japanese: 未来に託す思い)	Kazunori Mizuno	Junki Takegami	Masaya Onishi & Yūri Ichinose	May 21, 2015	October 9, 2022
Gaara orders his people to cancel the third part of the Chunin Exams and confronts Fugi who uses seppuku to pay his mistake. After fighting with Matsuri who keeps the heaven scroll with her team, Shira and Yome left Sen at the Sand Village to join the special forces, Ajisai dies on her final mission and being stored for use as one of the vessels for the Path of Pain, Hidan and Kakuzu captures Fu, and Tsunade promotes the rest of the Leaf Genin to Chunin and Neji as Jonin.

== Home media release ==
=== Japanese ===
Volume	Date	Discs	Episodes	Reference
1	September 2, 2015	1	394–397	
2	October 7, 2015	1	398–401	
3	November 4, 2015	1	402–405	
4	December 2, 2015	1	406–409	
5	January 6, 2016	1	410–413	

=== English ===
Viz Media (North America – Region 1/A)
Box set	Date	Discs	Episodes	Reference
31	June 27, 2017	2	389–402	
32	October 10, 2017	2	403–416	

Manga Entertainment (United Kingdom and Ireland – Region 2/B)
Volume	Date	Discs	Episodes	Reference
31	February 26, 2018	2	388–401	
32	May 21, 2018	2	402–415	

Madman Entertainment (Australia and New Zealand – Region 4/B)
Collection	Date	Discs	Episodes	Reference
31	September 6, 2017	2	388–401	
32	December 6, 2017	2	402–415	
