= Kinoto =

Kinoto may refer to:

- Kinoto, the Japanese name for the second of the Heavenly Stems
  - Kinoto, a grammatical marker used in Japanese kanbun
  - Any of the six kinoto years in a sexagenary cycle

People and fictional characters with the name Kinoto include:

- Masazo Kinoto, character JoJo's Bizarre Adventure: Diamond Is Unbreakable
- Kinoto, character in Naruto: Shippuden (season 16)

== See also ==
- Kinoton, a German electronics manufacturer
