= Naruto: Shippuden season 15 =

Naruto: Shippuden
- Season 15
- DVD cover for the Shippuden story arc titled The Fourth Great Ninja War: Sasuke and Itachi
- No. of episodes: 28

Release
- Original network: TV Tokyo
- Original release: July 18, 2013 – January 30, 2014

Season chronology
- ← Previous; Season 14 Next → Season 16

The fifteenth season of the anime television series Naruto: Shippuden is based on Part II of Masashi Kishimoto's Naruto manga series. The season focuses on the battle between Naruto Uzumaki and the Five Kage against Madara Uchiha and also focuses on the final reunion of Sasuke Uchiha and Itachi Uchiha, who both face off against Kabuto. The season is directed by Hayato Date, and produced by Pierrot and TV Tokyo. The season aired from July 2013 to January 2014.

The English dub of the season began airing on Neon Alley on November 28, 2015, until episode 338 on March 25, 2016, when the digital platform was beginning its shutdown and removed the anime from its rotation. The season would make its English television debut on Adult Swim's Toonami programming block and premiere from December 13, 2020, to July 4, 2021. By May 2021 at episode 339, Adult Swim began showing the never before aired dubbed episodes.

The DVD collection was released on March 5, 2014, under the title of The Fourth Great Ninja War: Sasuke and Itachi (忍界大戦・サスケとイタチ, Ninkai Taisen: Sasuke to Itachi).

The season contains five musical themes between two openings and three endings. The opening themes are "Niwaka Ame ni mo Makezu" (ニワカ雨ニモ負ケズ; "Not Even Sudden Rain Can Defeat Me") performed by Nico Touches the Walls (used for episodes 321 to 332) and "Tsuki no Ōkisa" (月の大きさ; "The Size of the Moon") performed by Nogizaka46 (used for episodes 333 to 348). The ending themes are "Yume o Idaite ~Hajimari no Crissroads~" (夢を抱いて～はじまりのクリスロード～; "Embrace Your Dreams ~Crissroads of the Beginning~") performed by Rake (used for episodes 321 to 332), "Black Night Town" (ブラックナイトタウン, Burakku Naito Taun) performed by Akihisa Kondō (used for episodes 333 to 343) and "Niji" (虹; "Rainbow") performed by Shinkū Hollow (used for the remaining episodes).

== Episodes ==
No. overall	No. in season	Title	Directed by	Written by	Animation directed by	Original release date	English air date
The Fourth Great Ninja War: Sasuke and Itachi
321	1	"Reinforcements Arrive"; Transliteration: "Zōen Tōchaku" (Japanese: 増援到着)	Directed by : Naoki Horiuchi; Storyboarded by : Yutaka Kagawa	Katsuhiko Chiba	Naoki Takahashi, Shunsuke Terasawa & Ichirou Ogawa	July 18, 2013	November 28, 2015
The White Zetsu Army continues wreaking havoc on the battlefields with the Allied Shinobi Forces struggling to root out the impostors until Naruto Uzumaki arrives, dispersing his shadow clones and use his sage Jutsu to weed out the White Zetsu with the Allied Shinobi regaining the upper hand. As reports come into HQ of Naruto's part in turning the tides of the war back in their favor, Tsunade smugly gestures to A who solemnly dismisses her. The Sensor Division is asked to check on Tobi's status and Ao revealing that he is on move with a team of reincarnated jinchūriki. Meanwhile where the remainder of the Fourth Division is located, Kabuto puts his trump card into play as he uses Mū to summon the coffin holding it. After Mū dodges the coffin being blown off, a sensor amongst the Alliance alerts them to a new enemy. Ōnoki recognizes the figure to be Madara Uchiha himself. Believing their enemy to have finally entered the fray, Gaara's revelation that Madara is a reanimated ninja causes confusion as Temari reveals the masked man who called himself Madara is seen elsewhere with a personal army of reanimated Jinchuriki.
322	2	"Madara Uchiha"; Transliteration: "Uchiha Madara" (Japanese: うちはマダラ)	Hiroyuki Yamashita	Shin Yoshida	Hiroyuki Yamashita	July 25, 2013	December 5, 2015
Though believing he was resurrected, Madara learns he was brought back with the Reanimation jutsu instead as Kabuto takes control over Mū's body to explains that he deduced the truth and reanimated Madara to force Tobi into their alliance. Madara is also informed of the modifications Kabuto done of his body and the events that occurred after his death before he proceeds to take down a large portion of the Fourth Division with his Susanoo. Madara then reveals that he possesses the Rinnegan when Gaara, Onoki and Naruto attack him, confirming Kabuto's hypothesis that Madara acquired a sample of Hashirama's blood when he faked his death in the events that created the Valley of the End. Madara then wipes out a fraction of the Fourth Division with his Shattered Heaven attack despite Onoki stopping one of the two summoned meteorites, attempting to summon the Nine-Tails before learning that the tailed beast is sealed within Naruto. Madara then proceeds to reveal that he possesses Hashirama's cells by using the First Hokage's Secret Wood Style Jutsu: Deep Forest Emergence, leaving Naruto and the other surviving shinobi of the Fourth Division in shock.
323	3	"The Five Kage Assemble"; Transliteration: "Gokage Shūketsu...!!" (Japanese: 五影集結...!!)	Directed by : Yoshihiro Sugai; Storyboarded by : Yukihiro Matsushita	Yuka Miyata	Daiki Handa	August 1, 2013	December 12, 2015
As Onoki and the remaining Fourth Division members tackle both Madara and Mū, Tsunade and A take a risky gambit to reach Madara's through Mabui's Heavenly Transfer Jutsu, normally used for transferring objects. Despite the high probability of being killed by the Jutsu, Tsunade decides to take the gamble using her Reverse Seal: Release. Shikaku telepathically communicates to Genma to have him, Raidō and Iwashi perform the Flying Raijin Justu to transport Mei to Madara's location as well while Naruto distracted Black Zetsu long enough for Chojuro to defeat the inhuman being. When the other Kage arrive at the battlefield, Tsunade heals Gaara and Onoki while A and Mei engage Madara as Dodai and the Hokage Guard Platoon chase after the Kabuto-controlled Mū. Once healed, the two saving A and Mei from their enemy's Yasaka Magatama, Gaara holds Madara at bay while Onoki joins the Kage under the cover of Mei's Hiding in Mist Jutsu to use a jutsu that effects A's weight so he can knock Mū and Madara a distance away. Though Naruto wants to help, Tsunade tells the boy that they will deal with Madara while he goes after the "other Madara". As the clone disperses, the Kage leave him one word: "win". At the same time, Naruto and Killer Bee cross paths with Tobi and the reanimated Jinchuriki.
324	4	"The Unbreakable Mask and the Shattered Bubble"; Transliteration: "Warenai Kamen・Wareta Shabondama" (Japanese: 割れない仮面・割れたシャボン玉)	Masaaki Kumagai	Junki Takegami	Masaya Onishi	August 8, 2013	December 18, 2015
Acquiring the knowledge from a clone fighting the real Madara while head butting Tobi, Naruto battles reanimated Jinchuriki while recognizing Utakata and meets him in a metaphysical plain. Utakata reveals what became of him after he left Tsuchigumo village and was captured by Pain before Naruto returns to reality as he and Bee battle the reanimated Jinchūriki. Naruto mentions meeting the real Madara with Tobi proclaiming his true identity is pointless as only the Project Tsuki no Mi matters to him, Tobi explains the world is worthless and that both Naruto and Bee should understand the misery it holds better than anyone else. However, Naruto admits his life with a Tailed Beast inside him isn't that bad while calling Tobi a liar and vowing to unmask him. As each of the reanimated Jinchuriki grows a tail, Tobi declares he will capture Naruto and Bee to fulfill his plan.
325	5	"Jinchūriki tai Jinchūriki!!" (Japanese: 人柱力VS人柱力!!)	Hisashi Ishii	Yasuyuki Suzuki	Min-Seop Shin & Yuuko Ishizaki	August 15, 2013	December 24, 2015
After he and Naruto learn that the captive Tailed Beasts have been resealed into their Jinchuriki, Killer Bee makes the first move by attacking Fu but he and Naruto learn the reanimated Jinchuriki are able to use the coordination of the Rinnegan's Six Paths of Pain in conjunction with the Sharingan's increased reaction time. Naruto attempts to destroy the Chakra receivers while Bee transforms into Gyuki to level the forest while knocking down the other Jinchuriki. But the reanimated Jinchuriki strike back with Han transforming into the Five-Tails while the others attack Naruto. Though Tobi attempts to use Kamui on Naruto to increase the odds in his favor, his plot is foiled by Kakashi Hatake and Guy arriving in the nick of time. Though Tobi tells them that they still have no chance against his eyes and Tailed Beasts, Kakashi states his Sharingan while Guy adds his notability as Konoha's Sublime Green Beast of Prey.
326	6	"Four Tails, the King of Sage Monkeys"; Transliteration: "Yonbi: Sen'en no Ō" (Japanese: 四尾・仙猿(せんえん)の王)	Directed by : Naomi Nakayama; Storyboarded by : Kanryou Kishikawa	Katsuhiko Chiba	Kumiko Horikoshi	August 22, 2013	December 31, 2015
After killing White Zetsu with his Eternal Mangekyo Sharingan's Susano'o, Sasuke Uchiha sets off to destroy Konoha. Back at the battlefield, as Kakashi and Guy learn that Tobi is using a large amount of chakra to assert full control over the Tailed Beasts, they hear the voice of the Five Tails as Tobi subjugates the creature. Voicing his disdain for humans' treatment of them, the Nine Tails recaps his own subjugation under Madara and then by the Uzumaki Clan from Hashirama's wife Mito to Naruto's mother Kushina. After Roshi fully transforms into the Four Tails, he swallows Naruto. The Four Tails meets Naruto and insists that he be called by his actual name: Son Goku. After a brief discussion about the humans' treatment of the Tailed Beasts, during which Naruto learns the Nine-Tailed Fox's true name is Kurama, Son sees Naruto to be an exception. Wanting to know if Naruto's desire to aid him and the other Tailed Beasts would not waver, Son asks the youth to free him from his chains.
327	7	"Nine Tails"; Transliteration: "Kyūbi" (Japanese: 九尾)	Directed by : Hiroaki Nishimura; Storyboarded by : Yutaka Kagawa	Yuka Miyata	Ik-Hyun Eum	August 29, 2013	January 7, 2016
Before revealing the method by which to stop him, Son verbally states his distrust of Naruto from his past experience with Jinchuriki. As Kurama listens to their dialogue, he relates to Son's distrust since he was also simply used and sealed by many ninja in the past. Losing himself in thought, Kurama recalls the events of how he ended up in Naruto's body and of the numerous attempts he made to break free by weakening Minato's Eight-Trigram seal and influencing Naruto with his own chakra on many occasions. But following a series of trials and battles, Naruto frees himself from his own hatred with Killer Bee's help and successfully takes control of the Nine-Tails chakra, leaving Kurama to ponder just what type of person Naruto actually is.
328	8	"Kurama" (Japanese: 九喇嘛)	Directed by : Shigeki Kawai; Storyboarded by : Yukihiro Matsushita	Yuka Miyata	Yuuri Ichinose & Anna Yamaguchi	August 29, 2013	January 14, 2016
With the battle receding at their end, Sakura Haruno and Shizune depart to assist Naruto and Bee. Elsewhere, Tobi realizes that Naruto is inside the Four-Tails and attempts to have the Gedo Statue absorb them both. Naruto is able to escape Son Goku's body by having him regurgitate due to his Multi-Shadow Clone Technique. Inside his subconscious, Son reveals to Naruto that the chakra rod is stuck at the base of his neck while in Tailed-Beast form and Naruto locates and starts pulling it out, with resistance from Tobi. Kurama silently over serves while recalling Naruto's past achievements by his willingness to never give up and accepts that if Naruto truly wishes to help the Tailed-Beasts from the bottom of his heart, then as he always has, his actions would speak far louder than his words. Finally, Naruto uses a clone in Sage Mode he left inside Son's body to find the exact spot the rod is located in relation to its position outside and uses Frog Strike to successfully push the rod out of the Four-Tails.
329	9	"Two-Man Team"; Transliteration: "Tsū-Man Seru" (Japanese: ツーマンセル)	Directed by : Kazunori Mizuno; Storyboarded by : Tomoyuki Kurokawa	Shin Yoshida	Masayuki Kouda	September 5, 2013	January 21, 2016
Though Son Goku awards him with a fragment of his Charka for freeing the Tailed Beast from Tobi's control, Naruto is upset upon learning Son keep hidden that he would still be bond to the Gedo Statue. Once Son is sealed back into the Gedo Statue, Tobi has all the other Jinchūriki fully transform into their Tailed Beasts for an all out attack. Silently proud of Naruto winning Son over, Kurama offers to lend the youth more power. Though annoyed of being thanked for helping Naruto during his clone's encounter with Madara, Kurama suggests melding their chakra together. Declaring Kurama as a friend while removing the seal, their blended chakra enables Naruto to assume a stronger version of his Nine Tails Chakra Mode. In his new Tailed Beast Mode, saving Kakashi and Guy, Naruto uses his remaining time in the form to battle the five Tailed Beasts while his clone locates their chakra receivers. The five Tailed Beasts make a collaborative Tailed Beast Ball, which Naruto matches with one of his own, sending the attacks into the sky. He sends clones through Kurama's chakra arms to remove the chakra receivers. Upon touching them, Naruto finds himself in a mental plane, along with Kurama, the other Jinchuriki and their Tailed Beasts. After the Jinchuriki and the Tailed Beasts give Naruto their names, they reveal the relationship between Roshi and Son to the youth. Watching his fellow Tailed Beasts each gift Naruto with a bit of their chakra like Son had, Kurama recalls their last moments with the Sage of the Six Paths at the time of their creation long ago. As Naruto removes the chakra receivers, Kurama is assured by the others' agreement with him that Naruto is the one the Sage foretold to show them the way. Forced to seal the Tailed Beasts back into the Gedo Statue, Tobi tells a reverted Naruto that his victory changes nothing despite the youth insisting that it has after learning a lot of difficult names.
330	10	"The Promise of Victory"; Transliteration: "Shōri e no Yogen" (Japanese: 勝利への予言)	Directed by : Chikao Tominaga; Storyboarded by : Hisashi Ishii	Masahiro Hikokubo	Min-Seop Shin & Yuuko Ishizaki	September 12, 2013	January 28, 2016
Tobi is confused by Naruto's claim of learning difficult names, which Naruto teases him for. Guy and Kakashi discuss now Naruto's progress is making them feel old, though not that old. Tobi begins to sweat, but assumes be the starting rainfall. Tobi gets a strange feeling from Naruto, and concludes that the war will make everything irrelevant. At the Allied Shinobi's HQ, Naruto's use of Kurama's chakra was felt, though they also feel something else. Ao relays the events to Shikaku, who wants to use it to raise the army's morale all at once, despite the strain it would cause to communications by Inoichi. Naruto's friends all rush towards his direction, intent on supporting him. Elsewhere, Sasuke also walks towards the battlefield as a thunderstorm begins.
331	11	"Eyes That See in the Dark"; Transliteration: "Yami o Miru Me" (Japanese: 闇を見る眼)	Directed by : Naoki Horiuchi; Storyboarded by : Yutaka Kagawa	Katsuhiko Chiba	Naoki Takahashi	September 19, 2013	February 4, 2016
Meanwhile in the Hidden Leaf, Konohamaru and his team-mates were out on patrol when they hear the captive Karin, who is feigning her mental instability to lessen the guards' attention and begins to plot her escape. At the same time, Jūgo and Suigetsu reach out of Orochimaru's hideouts while searching for Sasuke, Jūgo asking Suigetsu of his reasons for joining Team Taka before he suddenly goes berserk. Suigetsu manages to subdue Jūgo, whose rampage reveals a secret room where they find a scroll containing important information. Meanwhile, Sasuke wanders through a small deserted town after leaving the Mountains' Graveyard and encounters a group of White Zetsu who attack him upon learning he killed the original. Sasuke incinerates the rest with his Susano'o while keeping one alive long enough to learn about the war, running into Itachi while on the way to Naruto.
332	12	"A Will of Stone"; Transliteration: "Ishi no Ishi" (Japanese: 石の意志)	Directed by : Masaaki Kumagai; Storyboarded by : Yukihiro Matsushita	Yasuyuki Suzuki	Masaya Onishi	September 26, 2013	February 11, 2016
The intense battle between Madara and the five Kage continues as Onoki's golem is shattered by Madara countering with his Wood Style: Deep Forest Bloom. Tsunade recognizes the jutsu and instructs the Kage not to breathe in its released pollen. Gaara suspends the Kage and Ōnoki levitates A. Kabuto muses on how people thought no other shinobi is as powerful as Hashirama Senju, just like how people the Sage of Six Paths's power as legend. Elsewhere, the Hokage Guard Platoon along with Dodai and Sagan continue to pursue Mū. While the Kage are distracted, Madara unleashes his Susanoo, causing them to fall through the trees. Madara proceeds to set the forest ablaze and not long after, the five Kage became unconscious. Onoki struggles to regains consciousness while remembering how the First Tsuchikage taught him about the strong will of the Iwa shinobi, using his Particle Style to destroy Madara's forest as the other Kage regain their consciousness. As Madara's body reforms from Ōnoki's attack, the Kage are horrified to see a face-growth resembling Hashirama on Madara's chest. Madara reveals this to be the result of augmenting his body with Hashirama's DNA, expressing his intent to kill Tsunade first on the grounds of being Senju rather on the Kage's assumption of her being a medic ninja. After Madara belittle her a weak woman compared to the First Hokage, Tsunade responds that the Will of Fire inherited her grandfather is not something to underestimate. Meanwhile, Itachi tries to elude Sasuke while making his way Kabuto while refusing to as talk to him until Sasuke attempts to restrain him with his Susano'o.
333	13	"The Risks of the Reanimation Jutsu"; Transliteration: "Edo Tensei no Risuku" (Japanese: 穢土転生のリスク)	Directed by : Shigeru Ishii; Storyboarded by : Shinji Satou	Shin Yoshida	Daiki Handa	October 3, 2013	February 18, 2016
Madara questions Tsunade if the Will of Fire is enough to take him down as she states the three rules of wing a medical ninja while releasing her seal, explaining a fourth rule that overrides the other three for those like herself who the One Hundred Healings Jutsu. The other Kage are stunned to hear this while Madara remains unimpressed as she proceeds to slightly damage his Susano'o. Madara tries immolating Tsunade but is stopped by an attacking Mei, A and Onoki dealing a heavy blow on Madara before Tsunade lands a kick on him. Madara comments on Tsunade's abilities but explains he possesses Hashirama's remains in his cells along with the eyes of his brother Izuna Uchiha, adding that the only thing that could be passed on is hatred. Meanwhile, at the other battlefield, Chōza reveals to Dan that Madara Uchiha has been reanimated and that the five Kage are dealing with him. Dan was shocked to learn that Tsunade was now the Hokage and concern that the Renimation Jutsu's caster must be found since only Madara is too powerful for anyone short of Hashirama to defeat. Meanwhile, Gaara attempts to seal Madara after Tsunade landed a devastating attack on him. But it turns out to be a wood clone with the real Madara stabs Tsunade with his Susanoo Sword from below, deducing that Tsunade is able to heal without hand seals. Onoki attacks Madara with Particle Style but Madara absorbs it through the Preta Path, revealing he allowed the attack to hit him before. Tsunade questions Madara's confidence, stating that the Kage forced him to use a wood clone. Madara admits five on one is a good match-up creating twenty five wood clones to have them each fight the Kage in groups of five. Meanwhile in the forest, after evading Sasuke with his crows, Itachi finds Kabuto. But Sasuke managed to follow his brother wand briefly mistook Kabuto for Orochimaru. Kabuto attempts to manipulate Sasuke, only for him to note that he is his enemy. Itachi convinces Sasuke that they need Kabuto alive to cancel the reanimation jutsu, agreeing to his younger brother's demands to answer his questions once they succeed as the two Uchiha brothers and Kabuto prepared themselves for a dynamic battle that is to come.
334	14	"Sibling Tag Team"; Transliteration: "Kyōdai, Taggu!!" (Japanese: 兄弟、共闘(タッグ)!!)	Directed by : Kazunori Mizuno; Storyboarded by : Tetsuto Saitou	Katsuhiko Chiba	Kumiko Horikoshi	October 10, 2013	February 25, 2016
Kabuto blocks his vision with his hood as a means of evading the Uchiha's visual genjutsu, releasing multiple snakes at the two brothers as they then use their Susano'os to grab hold of them. As the fight continues, Kabuto tells Sasuke that he is underestimating him before revealing to have augmented himself with DNA samples from Taka's members: Suigetsu's flesh-liquid transformations, Karin's accelerated healing abilities, and Jugo's ability to utilize nature energy. Kabuto then reveals Jugo's lineage and how Orochimaru developed the Cursed Marks when his study on Jugo's DNA led him to the legendary Ryūchi Cave where the White Snake Sage lives. Though Orochimaru could not use Sage Jutsu as his host bodies couldn't tolerate nature energy, Kabuto semi-mastered it as he unveils his Sage Mode while expressing his intentions of transcend his former master as a snake becoming a dragon. Kabuto proceeds to overwhelm the Uchiha brothers before Itachi manages to counter at the last moment. Asking Sasuke if he remembered the plan they used while on a mission hunting a wild boar, Itachi uses his brother's aid to manage to cuts off one of Kabuto's horns. Meanwhile, the Kage battle Madara's twenty five wood clones before being disadvantaged when Madara has his clones conjure Susano'os of their own.
335	15	"To Each Their Own Leaf"; Transliteration: "Tagai no Konoha" (Japanese: 互いの木ノ葉)	Directed by : Mitsutaka Noshitani; Storyboarded by : Hisashi Ishii	Yasuyuki Suzuki	Min-Seop Shin & Yuuko Ishizaki	October 24, 2013	March 4, 2016
Kabuto is amused at the fact that Sasuke is now getting along well with his late brother, despite his intent to kill him in the past. Attempting to manipulate him over to his side by saying both their goals are to destroy the Hidden Leaf, Sasuke remains unconvinced as the young man denied his and Kabuto's goals are mutual. Recalling his life as a spy working for Konoha, Kabuto notes that he and Itachi are the same – both worked for the village and yet received dishonor in return. But Itachi declares himself still loyal to the Hidden Leaf regardless of its dark side and inconsistencies. Casting the conversation aside, Itachi tells Sasuke about a forbidden jutsu that decides destiny – Izanami, which he will use to stop Kabuto and the Reanimation jutsu. Wasting no time, Kabuto attacks the brothers once more with his Sage Art: Inorganic Reincarnation, causing the cave formations to attack them. Kabuto attempts to rewrite Itachi's mind with the talisman but is thwarted by Sasuke. Kabuto begins to boast about his current abilities and that he is closer than anyone in the world to the Sage of the Six Paths. Criticizing the Uchiha name in the process, he was stopped by Sasuke before he could say anything more as Itachi noted Kabuto reminded him of his old self. Kabuto recalls his childhood as an orphan taken in by Leaf Orphanage along Urushi with one of its overseers Nonō giving Kabuto his name and sense of purpose.
336	16	"Kabuto Yakushi"; Transliteration: "Yakushi Kabuto" (Japanese: 薬師カブト)	Directed by : Shigeki Kawai; Storyboarded by : Yutaka Kagawa	Masahiro Hikokubo	Masayuki Kouda	October 31, 2013	March 11, 2016
Kabuto remembers when he first met Orochimaru when he and the rest of the Leaf Orphanage aided several wounded Hidden Leaf Ninja, the Sannin member seeing potential in the child despite not interested in becoming a ninja. But that night, when Nonō is blackmailed by Danzo into an intelligence gathering mission in the Hidden Stone Village, Kabuto also ends up in Root's services as he spend much of his childhood infiltrating the villages of the Five Great Shinobi Nations. But while on an assassination mission in the Stone Village, Kabuto fatally wounds an attacker he recognized too late as Nonō. Kabuto tries to save Nonō, but runs off in shock when she did not recognize him and is found by Orochimaru. Orochimaru take Kabuto to his secret laboratory, revealing that Root set up Kabuto and Nonō to kill each other to silence them. Though ordered to kill any possible survivors, explaining that one can forge their true identity with the parts of those they meet, Orochimaru instead offers Kabuto a place as his right hand with the promise of his own identity. Following after Orochimaru's defeat by Sasuke, Kabuto took his mentor's words literally as he injected himself with various blood samples to become his "true self".
337	17	"The Izanami Activated"; Transliteration: "Hatsudō: Izanami" (Japanese: 発動・イザナミ)	Hiroaki Nishimura	Masahiro Hikokubo	Ik-Hyun Eum	November 7, 2013	March 18, 2016
Casting aside Itachi's lectures to him, Kabuto reveals he assimilated more than just Orochimaru's DNA as he creates a construct of Sakon from the base of his navel snake to utilize the powers of the Sound Five. Although easily countering Kabuto's attacks at first, Itachi and Sasuke find themselves trapped in Tayuya's genjutsu so he can finish them off with a white snake Orochimaru construct. Though the brothers manages to escape the genjutsu and fend the snake off, Kabuto emerges from the serpent's mouth and bisects Itachi with the snake sage tearfully stating his superiority before attempting to regain control over the reanimated ninja. As his body reforms, Itachi called out to Sasuke as he threw his sword at Kabuto, only for the snake sage to block and then counter. Kabuto then attacks Itachi with the sword and claimed that his genjutsu cannot affect him. But upon realizing a sense of déjá vu in the brothers' attack pattern, having claimed to be immune to such a trick, Kabuto learns that he is trapped with his mind via the endless loop of the Uchiha Clan's genjutsu Izanami.
338	18	"Izanagi and Izanami"; Transliteration: "Izanagi to Izanami" (Japanese: イザナギとイザナミ)	Directed by : Kazunori Mizuno; Storyboarded by : Yukihiro Matsushita	Masahiro Hikokubo	Yuuri Ichinose & Seiko Asai	November 14, 2013	March 25, 2016
With Kabuto trapped within Izanami's infinite loop, Sasuke uses this time to question his brother about the jutsu. Itachi explains to Sasuke that the Izanami was created as a counter to against users of its counterpart Izanagi, intended to make those who struggle against fate accept it in order for them to escape the infinite loop. Angered by the fact that Itachi would cast a technique that has an escape route, Sasuke questions his motives to which Itachi says that he wished to give Kabuto an opportunity to accept his fate. Sasuke insists that Itachi is perfect and nothing like Kabuto, only for the elder Uchiha to refute this claim. Elsewhere, somewhere in a forest seemingly some distance away, a grown-up Urushi tells his comrade that he hoped by the time he gets home, Kabuto will be there. Back at the cave, Itachi prepares to end the Reanimation jutsu.
339	19	"I Will Love You Always"; Transliteration: "Omae o Zutto Aishiteiru" (Japanese: お前をずっと愛している)	Directed by : Atsushi Nigorikawa; Storyboarded by : Shinji Satou	Yuka Miyata	Masaya Onishi & Kumiko Horikoshi	November 21, 2013	May 2, 2021 (Note: English air dates of Naruto: Shippuden from this point onward refer to its first broadcast on U.S. television on Adult Swim's Toonami programming block.)
Back at the frontlines, the five Kage continue struggling against Madara's Susanoo-clad wood clones while Onoki remind them of their promise to Naruto. Madara decides to focus on breaking Onoki's spirt as the Kage renew their offensive against Madara's clones once more, activating his Susanoo's final from and proceeds to use its sword to attack them. Elsewhere at the cave, as Sasuke remains adamant to destroy the Hidden Leaf for what it did to his brother, Itachi proceeds to place Kabuto under a genjutsu to cancel to the Reanimation Jutsu. Across the battlefields, the reanimated ninja begin to leave their vessels a with their souls beginning to return to the afterlife. Itachi uses his remaining moments to show Sasuke the true events learning to the Uchiha Clan Massacre, telling his brother he will always love him regardless of the path he takes from this moment forth.
340	20	"Reanimation Jutsu: Release!"; Transliteration: "Edo Tensei: Kai" (Japanese: 穢土転生・解)	Directed by : Eiko Nishi; Storyboarded by : Hisashi Ishii	Katsuhiko Chiba	Min-Seop Shin & Yuuko Ishizaki	November 28, 2013	May 9, 2021
Watching Itachi's soul depart back into the afterlife, Sasuke becomes conflicted with his resolve before being found by Suigetsu and Jugo. As the various ninja that Kabuto reanimated are descending back into the afterlife, the other Kage mystified by the turn of events while Onoki notes whoever is responsible is a true hero among ninja. But Madara proceeds to attack them before Tsunade was saved by Dan, taking advantage of the situation by using his Ghost Transformation jutsu to take control of his then-ascending soul and possess Tsunade long to gives her closure along with his remaining chakra to restore her Reserve Seal. Tsunade comes while she and the other Kage find Madara still among the living, the villain revealing that he exploited the Reanimation Jutsu's only flaw to rescind the summoning contract and is now no longer under the control of its caster. Despite this new of events, the Kage refuse to back down. Meanwhile, as Naruto realized Itachi succeeded, Tobi admits they forced his hand as he feeds the Benihisago and Sealing Urn to the Gedo Statue before it begins screaming.
341	21	"Orochimaru's Return"; Transliteration: "Fukkatsu!! Orochimaru" (Japanese: 復活!! 大蛇丸)	Directed by : Naoki Horiuchi; Storyboarded by : Yukihiro Matsushita	Yasuyuki Suzuki	Naoki Takahashi & Shinichi Suzuki	December 5, 2013	May 16, 2021
Suigetsu presents Sasuke with the scroll he and Jugo found at Orochimaru's hideout earlier, confused when Sasuke resolves to bring back Orochimaru after examining the scroll's contents. Sasuke explains to Suigetsu that Orochimaru is not the type to die so easily while asking Jugo to extract a piece of Kabuto's sage mode skin and apply on Anko's Curse Mark, reviving him by preparing the Curse Mark sealing jutsu in reverse. Orochimaru admits he lacks the strength to take Sasuke's body while amazed that the youth both brought him back and deduced the Curse Marks contain fragments of his consciousness, thus knowing about the war and having no interest. Further impressed with Sasuke after being shown the scroll he receive earlier and intention of seeing "them" before making his next move, Orochimaru reclaims his chakra from the immobilized Kabuto while agreeing to guide his former apprentice to the answers he seeks. Elsewhere, Naruto and the others witness Tobi beginning to revive the Gedou Statue into its true form as the Ten-Tails with Kakashi wondering how it is possible as the Eight-Tails and the Nine-Tails were not captured. Killer Bee and Gyuki realize they unintentionally provided Tobi with the tentacle clone used in their escape while Kurama momentarily takes over Naruto's body to explain the treasured tools fed to the Gedo Statue held Gold and Silver Brothers who ingested his chakra ages ago. Kurama adds how dangerous the Ten-Tails is as the progenitor of Chakra, but they might stand a chance since its resurrection is incomplete. But Tobi retorts that even an incompletely revived Ten Tails is enough to cast the Infinite Tsukuyomi. The group rallies to fight and Naruto leaps towards the Gedou Statue while entering his Nine-Tails Chakra Mode.
342	22	"Secret of the Transportation Technique"; Transliteration: "Jikūkan Ninjutsu no Himitsu" (Japanese: 時空間忍術の秘密)	Masaaki Kumagai	Shin Yoshida	Daisuke Tsumagari & Anna Yamaguchi	December 12, 2013	May 23, 2021
After thinking about his past and vowing he will become the greatest of all the Hokage, Naruto prepares to fight. Tobi goes on the defense to prevent Naruto and his allies from preventing the Gedo Statue's regeneration into the Ten-Tails, managing to negate Kakashi's Kamui on the creature while holding Naruto and Guy at bay. Tobi exploits Naruto's attempted attack to make an attempt on him, only to be forced to fall back while warping a lightning-imbued kunai Kakashi there at him. The group then notice a crack on Tobi's mask as he erects a barrier around the Gedo Statue to hinder Gyūki and prevent further interference. Kakashi gets the others to help confirm his theory that Tobi's phasing and teleportation are actually both forms of the same Kamui technique of his Sharingan eye. When Kakashi demands how he acquired it, Tobi unnerves him by claiming he acquired it from the a battle at Kannabi Bridge. As Tobi states there is no more hope for the world, Naruto rejects his views and allows Kurama to briefly take over his body. Kurama declares that Minato sealed him within Naruto to give the youth the power to take him down, giving Naruto back control while urging him to charge Tobi head on.
343	23	"Who Are You?"; Transliteration: "Temē wa Dare da!!" (Japanese: てめーは誰だ!!)	Directed by : Kazuya Iwata; Storyboarded by : Shinji Satou	Masahiro Hikokubo	Daiki Handa	December 19, 2013	May 30, 2021
Naruto attacks Tobi in Tailed Beast Mode while Kakashi and Guy look on, the former initially hesitant to join the fray over disbelief of the masked man's identity before Guy snaps him out of it. Tobi unleashes a shower of gigantic chakra receivers, paralyzing B and Gyūki. Naruto creates a shadow clone that charges forward with a Rasengan before suddenly disappearing while the original prepares a Tailed Beast Ball with B and Gyūki acting as a shield. Tobi escapes the Naruto's Tailed Beast Ball, but realizes too late that Kakashi sent the clone to the other dimension as the Rasengan shatters his mask, the Naruto clone shouting, "Who are you?!". Kakashi and Guy are shocked to find the masked man to be their former comrade Obito Uchiha, a student of Minato's who was alongside Kakashi and Rin Nohara. He was a member of their team before Obito was thought to have died during the efforts to destroy the Kannabi Bridge which occurred during the Third Great Ninja War at Kannabi Bridge as flashbacks show young Obito entering the Academy and befriending Rin and developing a rivalry with Kakashi as well as his promotion to Chunin with his classmates being Asuma, Kurenai and Might Guy and the mission that saw Kakashi lose the sight in his left eye before he inherited Obito's Sharigan with the mission ending with Obito's presumed death. In the present, Guy informs Naruto of their opponent's true identity while Kakashi is devastated that Obito faked his death with Obito revealing that he knew Kakashi failed to protect Rin as promised which has Kakashi stunned. Naruto motivates a devastated Kakashi that Obito needs to be stopped before intercepting his Fire Style: Bomb Blast Dance with Kurama's tails. Just then, Madara appears alongside Obito to the others' surprise.
344	24	"Obito and Madara"; Transliteration: "Obito to Madara" (Japanese: オビトとマダラ)	Directed by : Kazunori Mizuno; Storyboarded by : Yukihiro Matsushita	Yasuyuki Suzuki	Kumiko Horikoshi	January 9, 2014	June 6, 2021
When Obito is joined by Madara, who nonchalantly reveals that he dispatched the five Kage to Naruto and his allies. From there, ignoring Naruto and expressing disappointment towards Obito for deviating from their plan, Madara learns that his intended resurrection through the Samsara of Life was ruined by Nagato using it on the Hidden Leaf ninja. Upon learning of Nagato was nothing more but a sacrificial pawn, Naruto attacks Madara with a Super Mini-Tailed Beast Ball which the Uchiha dispatches as he moves to capture the jinchuriki while Obito deals with Kakashi and Guy. When Kakashi uses this opportunity to question his old friend about what had happened to him, Obito gets a flashback of being heavily bandaged and stitched together by an elderly figure who explains of his physical condition after saving him. The figure introduces himself as Madara and tells the younger Uchiha of his goals to unify the world, but an uninterested Obito resolves to reunite with his teammates.
345	25	"I'm in Hell"; Transliteration: "Ore wa Jigoku ni Iru" (Japanese: オレは地獄に居る)	Hiroyuki Yamashita	Katsuhiko Chiba	Hiroyuki Yamashita	January 16, 2014	June 13, 2021
Obito is tended to by two White Zetsu during his rehabilitation, annoyed by their interest in humans' bodily functions while learning more of about Madara's goal of a world where no one suffers. The recovering Obito soon trains himself while adapting to the prosthetic limbs that Madara developed from the White Zetsu. One day, White Zetsu informs Obito that his team-mates are being attacked by Hidden Mist ninja. When Obito fails to break through the rock blocking the exit, the White Zetsu known as Tobi offers himself as armor for Obito to wear and obliterate the rock by drawing power from the Gedo Statue. Despite Obito insisting he will not come back, Madara says that he younger Uchiha will show him proper gratitude when he returns. Obito ignores a vision of Rin he felt through his empty eye-socket while racing to the battlefield, adamant that he and Kakashi will be able to use their Sharingan's full potential while Tobi explains that Obito might have gained additional power from being infused with Hashirama's cells. Obito arrives to find a dying Rin impaled by Kakashi's Chidori as she utters Kakashi's name before hitting the ground, dead. As Kakashi studies Rin's body, both he and Obito unknowingly awaken both their Mangekyō Sharingan. Kakashi passes out from exhaustion while a bereaved Obito slaughters the surrounding Mist ninja while avoid their attacking, finishing the rest off with Wood Style: Cutting Sprigs. Approaching Rin's body while standing in a pool of blood, Obito concludes he is in hell while mourning the death of the girl he loved.
346	26	"World of Dreams"; Transliteration: "Yume no Sekai" (Japanese: 夢の世界)	Directed by : Eiko Nishi; Storyboarded by : Hisashi Ishii	Shin Yoshida	Min-Seop Shin & Yuuko Ishizaki	January 23, 2014	June 20, 2021
Still in disbelief over what has happened, having killed the Hidden Mist ninja and ignoring an unconscious Kakashi, Obito cradles Rin's lifeless body. Obito then remembers Madara and White Zetsu's words while vowing to change the world into one where Rin lives, returning to Madara as a changed person. After teaching Obito the means to summon the Gedo Statue along with imparting all his skill and knowledge, Madara uses a Yin-Yang Style ability on White Zetsu to infuse the creature with an embodiment of his will: Black Zetsu. Madara then dies after severing his connection to the Gedo Statue which prolonged his life, telling Obito to act under his identity until the day Madara is resurrected by the one he transplanted his eyes into: Nagato. Soon after, now going by the name Madara Uchiha with Zetsu accompanying him, Obito arrives to the Hidden Rain Village where he meets Nagato and his friends. Though Obito tempts Nagato with his knowledge and offer to aid him in achieving peace, Yahiko gets his friend and Konan away. Obito ignores Yahiko's threat to stay away while telling Nagato that he would wait for him at the same time and place everyday until he accepts the truth of his words. Soon after saving orphans from a bandit named Kyūsuke whose group they win over to their cause, Yahiko decides to name their group the Akatsuki.
347	27	"Creeping Shadow"; Transliteration: "Shinobiyoru Kage" (Japanese: 忍び寄る影)	Directed by : Sekito Kanno; Storyboarded by : Shinji Satou	Shin Yoshida	Ik-Hyun Eum	January 23, 2014	June 27, 2021
Being informed by Kakashi that the orphans he trained have begun to bring about change in the Hidden Rain Village through dialogue, Jiraiya expresses his satisfaction with his students' progress. At the Hidden Rain, Kyūsuke brings request letters for the Akatsuki's aid to Yahiko, who intends to surpass Hanzo one day. Hanzo learned of the Akatsuki's existence from one of his men and expresses approval towards the organisation for sharing his ideals. Meanwhile, Yahiko, Konan and Nagato head to a small village that was attacked earlier by Hidden Stone ninja, deciding to approach them to resolve this peacefully. But the attackers refuse to listen with Yahiko forced to kill one with him and Konan being injured enraged Nagato enough to unconscious summoning the Gedo Statue in response. But the two manage to stop Nagato in time and leave, unaware that the Hidden Stone ninja were Danzo and his ANBU in disguise to break Hidden Stone's ceasefire with the Hidden Leaf. Seeing an opportunity to acquire the Rinnegan, Danzo has his deceased subordinates disguised as Hidden Rain ninja to trick Hanzo into believing the Akatsuki are a threat to his authority. All the while, Obito and Zestu observe the events.
348	28	"The New Akatsuki"; Transliteration: "Shinsei: "Akatsuki"" (Japanese: 新生・"暁")	Atsushi Nigorikawa	Shin Yoshida	Kumiko Horikoshi & Masaya Onishi	January 30, 2014	July 4, 2021
Yahiko reveals to Nagato his intention of stepping down as the Akatsuki's leader and asks his friend to take his place, the two unaware of Konan's capture while approached by a disguised Danzo who informs them that Hanzo wishes to meet them. Before heading out with Yahiko, Nagato is approached by Obito and is warned to prepared himself to face reality when he refuses to abandon his friends. After Nagato and Yahiko head out, Kyusuke receives a letter that the Leaf's ANBU are also meeting with Hanzo and realizes it is a trap. Kyusuke and the other Akatsuki members attempt to catch up with Yahiko and Nagato before being intercepted and slaughtered by Obito and Zetsu, the former wanting Nagato to experience the same tragedy he suffered from witnessing Rin's death. The two arrive to the site of the meeting with Hanzo and bare witness as Yahiko runs himself through Nagato's kunai when his friend is forced by Hanzo to decide to kill him or watch Konan die. Enraged while his legs are heavily damaged by adhesive paper bombs as a result of saving Konan, Nagato uses his Rinnegan to slaughter the Leaf and Rain shinobi with the Gedo Statue while Hanzo and Danzo escape. Soon after meeting Obito, having now embraced his ideals, Nagato finished converting Yahiko's corpse into the Deva Path of his Six Paths of Pain so he would remain the Akatsuki's leader.

== Home media release ==
=== Japanese ===
Volume	Date	Discs	Episodes	Reference
1	March 4, 2014	1	321–324	
2	April 2, 2014	1	325–328	
3	May 7, 2014	1	329–332	
4	July 2, 2014	1	333–336	
5	July 2, 2014	1	337–340	
6	August 6, 2014	1	341–344	
7	September 3, 2014	1	345–348	

=== English ===
Viz Media (North America – Region 1/A)
Box set	Date	Discs	Episodes	Reference
25	January 26, 2016	2	310–322	
26	April 5, 2016	2	323–335	
27	July 5, 2016	2	336–348	

Viz Media (North America, Region 1 Blu-ray sets)
Volume	Date	Discs	Episodes	Ref.
12	November 17, 2026	4	305–332	

Manga Entertainment (United Kingdom and Ireland – Region 2/B)
Volume	Date	Discs	Episodes	Reference
25	August 15, 2016	2	310–322	
26	October 17, 2016	2	323–335	
27	February 6, 2017	2	336–348	

Madman Entertainment (Australia and New Zealand – Region 4/B)
Collection	Date	Discs	Episodes	Reference
25	April 6, 2016	2	310–322	
26	September 7, 2016	2	323–335	
27	October 5, 2016	2	336–348	
