= Naruto: Shippuden season 17 =

Naruto: Shippuden
- Season 17
- DVD cover for the Shippuden story arc titled The Fourth Great Ninja War: The Return of Team 7
- No. of episodes: 11

Release
- Original network: TV Tokyo
- Original release: May 15 – August 14, 2014

Season chronology
- ← Previous; Season 16 Next → Season 18

The seventeenth season of the anime television series Naruto: Shippuden is based on Part II of Masashi Kishimoto's Naruto manga series. The season continues with the repentant Sasuke Uchiha joining with Naruto Uzumaki, Sakura Haruno, Kakashi Hatake and the allied shinobi forces to battle against Madara Uchiha and Obito Uchiha. The episodes are directed by Hayato Date, and produced by Pierrot and TV Tokyo. The season aired from May to August 2014.

The season would make its English television debut on Adult Swim's Toonami programming block and air from November 14, 2021, to January 23, 2022.

The DVD collection was released on January 7, 2015, under the title of The Fourth Great Ninja War: The Return of Team 7 (忍界大戦・第七班再び, Ninkai Taisen: Dainanahan Futatabi).

The season contains three musical themes, including one opening and two endings. The opening theme song, "Guren" (紅蓮; "Crimson") performed by Does, is used from episodes 362 to 372. The first ending theme song, "Flame" performed by Dish, is used from episodes 362 to 366, while the second ending theme song, "Never Change" performed by Shun feat. Lyu:Lyu, is used from episodes 367 to 372.

== Episodes ==
No. overall	No. in season	Title	Directed by	Written by	Animation directed by	Original release date	English air date
The Fourth Great Ninja War: The Return of Team 7
362	1	"Kakashi's Resolve"; Transliteration: "Kakashi no Ketsui" (Japanese: カカシの決意)	Directed by : Takuma Suzuki; Storyboarded by : Hisashi Ishii	Junki Takegami	Min-Seop Shin & Yūko Ishizaki	May 15, 2014	November 14, 2021
After repelling Naruto Uzumaki's Super Mini-Tailed Beast Ball while chiding Obito for deviating from the plan, including the method of his resurrection, Madara decides to take matters into his own hands to capture the remaining tailed beasts by using the First Hokage's Wood Dragon to bind Kurama and Gyuki. Meanwhile, Kakashi Hatake tries to understand Obito's reasons but is severely drained from overusing his Sharingan as he gets endlessly pummeled. Luckily, while stopping Madara's Susanoo from killing him, Killer Bee, and Guy, Naruto uses a shadow clone to save Kakashi. Hearing Naruto's words as an allusion to Obito's childhood ideals, Kakashi gains the resolve to protect his student. Convincing Naruto to let him control his body for a bit, Kurama reinvigorates Kakashi with a chakra boost and tricked Obito into warping the copy ninja into the other dimension so he can lose his advantage through Kamui. Afterwards, as Gyuki attempts to break through the Gedo Statue's barrier, Naruto turns his attention to the Gedo Statue as he and Killer Bee use two Tailed Beast Bombs in hopes to destroy the statue before its regeneration into the Ten-Tails is complete. Despite the apparent victory, the revived Ten-Tails appears from the fading smoke.
363	2	"The Allied Shinobi Forces Jutsu"; Transliteration: "Shinobi Rengōgun no Jutsu!" (Japanese: 忍連合軍の術!)	Gorou Sessha	Hideto Tanaka	Tatsuya Koyanagi	May 22, 2014	November 21, 2021
Following the Ten-Tails' arrival, Obito and Madara quickly attach themselves to it and launch an attack against Naruto and the others. However, Kurama quickly takes charge of the situation and uses a strategy with Kakashi to deliver Gyuki close enough to the Ten-Tails to launch a Tailed Beast Ball at point blank range. However, the Ten-Tails proves to be much too powerful for the pair of Tailed Beasts, forcing them to retreat into their hosts and leaving Naruto, Kakashi and Guy at the mercy of its own Tailed Beast Ball. However, the Allied Shinobi Forces make a grand appearance, with Ino and Hinata able to deflect the attack. With their arrival, Naruto boldly proclaims to Madara that their "Allied Shinobi Forces Jutsu" is more powerful than the Infinite Tsukuyomi, also prompting Obito to join the argument. Meanwhile, Shikaku uses the opportunity to develop a strategy involving the Shinobi Forces which he eventually relays with the help of Inochi and they are able to immobilize the Ten-Tails inside a pit of concrete. Finally, as the Shinobi Alliance charges at Madara and Obito, the Ten-Tails begins undergoing a metamorphosis.
364	3	"The Ties That Bind"; Transliteration: "Tsunagareru-mono" (Japanese: 繋がれるもの)	Masaaki Kumagai	Shin Yoshida	Kumiko Horikoshi	June 5, 2014	November 28, 2021
In the midst of the Allied Shinobi Forces' attack, the Ten-Tails undergoes a sudden transformation, repels the attack and escape from the concrete pit. Madara and Obito launches the Tailed-Beast Balls in all directions, including the Allied HQ. The explosion destroys the headquarters, killing Shikaku and Inoichi. Afterwards, Madara outlines his plan to become the Ten-Tails' Jinchūriki to Obito. The Ten-Tails launch a barrage of wooden spikes that kill many of the Allied Shinobi Forces' members, including Neji, who dies saving Naruto and Hinata. Obito proceeds to mock Neji's death, which briefly causes Naruto to contemplate giving himself up to Obito and Madara. However, Hinata begs Naruto to not let Neji's murder go unpunished and this snaps him out of his stupor. The revitalized Naruto then boosts the remaining Allied Shinobi Forces members with Kurama's chakra, vowing that he will kill Obito and Madara for everything they've done. Obito tries to wipe out the Allied Shinobi Forces with a close-range Tailed-Beast Ball, only for it to be repelled by the recovered Bee.
365	4	"Those Who Dance in the Shadows"; Transliteration: "Shinobimau Mono-tachi" (Japanese: 忍び舞う者たち)	Directed by : Naoki Horiuchi; Storyboarded by : Shinji Satō	Katsuhiko Chiba	Naoki Takahashi & Shinichi Suzuki	June 12, 2014	December 12, 2021
Using their newly-gained powers the Allied Shinobi Forces corner the Ten-Tails and manage to sever Obito and Madara's bond with it. Meanwhile, Sasuke Uchiha, Orochimaru, Jugo and Suigetsu sneak into Konoha and enter the Uchiha's Nakano Shrine, where Orochimaru breaks the Reaper Death Seal and performs the Reanimation Jutsu to reanimate all of the previous Hokages.
366	5	"The All-Knowing"; Transliteration: "Subete o Shiru Mono-tachi" (Japanese: 全てを知る者たち)	Directed by : Kazunori Mizuno; Storyboarded by : Shinji Satō	Masahiro Hikokubo	Seiko Asai	June 19, 2014	January 9, 2022
Having been reanimated by Orochimaru, the previous Hokages immediately suspect the former to be up to his old schemes until he adds that they were brought solely to answer Sasuke's questions. Sasuke wastes no time in getting Hiruzen to confirm the truth about Itachi and follows up by questioning Tobirama on the Uchiha clan, where the latter explains that the power of the Sharingan manifests when a clan member experiences deep emotional trauma, which in turn gives rise to hatred. Afterwards Orochimaru tells the Hokages of the ongoing war and when Tobirama tries to leave, Orochimaru threatens to use them to attack the Leaf Village if they fail to appease Sasuke's questions. Afterwards Sasuke asks Hashirama to explain the concepts of a "village" and "shinobi". Realizing that his answer would influence Sasuke's actions, Hashirama decides to begin his explanation by recounting his final climactic battle with Madara at the Valley of the End.
367	6	"Hashirama and Madara"; Transliteration: "Hashirama to Madara" (Japanese: 柱間とマダラ)	Directed by : Kazuya Iwata; Storyboarded by : Yukihiro Matsushita	Shin Yoshida	Eiichi Tokura	July 3, 2014	January 9, 2022
Hashirama continues to tell his story, telling of when he first met Madara at a river when they were children during a time where ninja were without villages and hired by feudal lords for numerous bloody conflicts. The two bond over their hardships of losing brothers in the fighting, and their mutual dream to end the wars and create peace. However, Hashirama's father Butsuma finds out about their meetings and reveals to his son that Madara is an Uchiha, and orders him to spy on him.
368	7	"The Era of Warring States"; Transliteration: "Sengoku Jidai" (Japanese: 戦国時代)	Atsushi Nigorikawa	Shin Yoshida	Yūri Ichinose & Masaya Onishi	July 10, 2014	January 9, 2022
During the next meeting between Hashirama and Madara, the two try to warn each other that their families are after them. But when Butsuma and Tobirama arrive at the same time as Madara's brother Izuna and their father Tajima and the confrontation leads to Izuna almost being killed, Madara accepts the reality they live in and agrees to continue fighting against the Senju. As the years pass, Hashirama and Madara become the leaders of their respective clans as the conflict between their families continues with many casualties. During one such battle, Tobirama fatally wounds Izuna. The next time the Senju brothers encounter Madara in a later battle, he informs them that Izuna had succumbed to his injuries and had left him his eyes to continue protecting their clan. But despite having acquired the Eternal Mangekyō Sharingan, Madara is still defeated by Hashirama. Stopping Tobirama from delivering the final blow, Hashirama makes another attempt to offer Madara peace. But Madara tells him that he will accept if Hashirama takes his own life or Tobirama's. Hashirama agrees, and has his kin swear that the feud between their clans will end and that no harm will come to the Uchiha after his death. However, seeing his former friend's resolve, Madara stops Hashirama from taking his life and accepts his proposal. With peace between the Senju and the Uchiha, the establishment of Konoha soon follows.
369	8	"My True Dream"; Transliteration: "Hontō no Yume" (Japanese: 本当の夢)	Directed by : Yoshihiko Iwata; Storyboarded by : Hisashi Ishii	Masahiro Hikokubo	Min-Seop Shin & Yūko Ishizaki	July 24, 2014	January 16, 2022
With the Uchiha and the Senju clans forming an alliance, Madara and Hashirama's childhood dream of a village where children were not sent to battle has come to fruition. The village itself would ally with the Land of Fire. Having heard of his elder brother's intentions to choose Madara as the Hokage, Tobirama argues that things are done democratically now and everyone, even the Uchiha, would not see Madara in the same light as Hashirama. Madara brings Hashirama to the Naka Shrine, and tells him that he intends to leave the village. Not understanding Madara's true agenda, Hashirama attempts to persuade him to not leave the village but is unsuccessful, and after leaving Konoha, Madara continues to attack it and destroy his previous dream.
370	9	"Sasuke's Answer"; Transliteration: "Sasuke no Kotae" (Japanese: サスケの答え)	Directed by : Yoshihiro Yanagiya; Storyboarded by : Shinji Satō	Masahiro Hikokubo	Kumiko Horikoshi	July 31, 2014	January 16, 2022
The battle between Hashirama and Madara concludes with Hashirama killing Madara and resolving himself to endure in order to protect his dream. Back in the present day, after hearing Hashirama's story and reflecting on Itachi's life, Sasuke decides that the village that Itachi sacrificed his life to protect should not be wasted, and decides to enter the battlefield to follow his will. After Karin escapes from the prison and joins back up with them, the resurrected Hokage prepare to head to the battlefield.
371	10	"Hole"; Transliteration: "Kazaana" (Japanese: 風穴)	Directed by : Masayuki Yamada; Storyboarded by : Yukihiro Matsushita	Katsuhiko Chiba	Ik-Hyun Eum	August 7, 2014	January 23, 2022
As he continues defending his comrades from Obito and Madara's various attacks, Naruto begins to tire from micromanaging Kurama's chakra. The Ten-Tails begins going through another transformation and begins to perform a massive attack. Kakashi attempts to stop it with his Kamui before he is intercepted by Obito and the two go to the other dimension. The Ten-Tails's technique causes massive destruction yet the shinobi survive thanks to Naruto. Unfortunately, Naruto, worn out and injured, drops out of the Nine-Tails Chakra Mode and causes the cloaks of the alliance to fade away. Meanwhile, Kakashi gains the upper hand against Obito, aiming his Lightning Blade at him, but stops due to not wanting to kill his former teammate. Kakashi tries to persuade him into reverting to how he was before but is taunted in response. Obito reveals that he is aware of the true story of Rin's death being that Mist ninjas planned to use her to unleash the Three-Tails on Konoha and she purposely made herself to die by Kakashi's hand to protect her village. He uses a genjutsu to show Kakashi that he no longer has a heart and that the Infinite Tsukuyomi will save everyone. The Ten-Tails begins preparing a large Tailed Beast Ball, as the Alliance despairs.
372	11	"Something to Fill the Hole"; Transliteration: "Umeru-mono" (Japanese: 埋めるもの)	Directed by : Masaaki Kumagai; Storyboarded by : Shinji Satō	Katsuhiko Chiba & Yuka Miyata	Kirara Hoshizora	August 14, 2014	January 23, 2022
The Ten-Tails fires its enormous Tailed Beast Ball at the Alliance. Shikamaru, with the help of Ino's jutsu, devises a last-minute plan to counter its powerful attack by creating an earth barrier and Bee slowing down the Tailed Beast Ball, changing its trajectory. However, the attack manages to pierce through the barriers of the Alliance and Bee quickly blocks it on his own. The ball suddenly disappears as Minato arrives, telling the Alliance that he teleported it to the sea. The other Hokages soon arrive and create a special barrier to trap the Ten-Tails. Sasuke arrives, much to the shock of Konoha 11, and he tells them that he has decided to protect the village and aspires to become Hokage. Reuniting with Naruto and Sakura Haruno, Team 7 prepare themselves against the Ten Tails. Meanwhile in Kamui's dimension, Obito continues to berate Kakashi about the failing reality in this world and value of comrades but Kakashi tells Obito that losing the feelings of his comrades is much worse than trash and he believes that his comrades will fill the hole inside his heart.

== Home media release ==
=== Japanese ===
Volume	Date	Discs	Episodes	Reference
1	January 7, 2015	1	362–365	
2	February 4, 2015	1	366–369	
3	March 4, 2015	1	370–372, 376–377	

=== English ===
Viz Media (North America – Region 1/A)
Box set	Date	Discs	Episodes	Reference
29	January 17, 2017	2	362–374	

Manga Entertainment (United Kingdom and Ireland – Region 2/B)
Volume	Date	Discs	Episodes	Reference
29	July 24, 2017	2	362–374	

Madman Entertainment (Australia and New Zealand – Region 4/B)
Collection	Date	Discs	Episodes	Reference
29	March 8, 2017	2	362–374	
