= Barrette (song) =

2013 single by Nogizaka46

- Regular edition cover

Single by Nogizaka46

from the album Tōmei na Iro
- B-side: "Tsuki no Ōkisa"; "Watashi no Tame ni Dareka no Tame ni" (Type-A); "Sonna Baka na..." (Type-B); "Hatsukoi no Hito o Ima demo" (Type-C); "Yasashisa towa" (Regular)
- Released: November 27, 2013 (Japan)
- Genre: J-pop
- Length: 25:54
- Label: N46Div.
- Songwriters: Yoshihiro Saito; Takahiro Furukawa
- Producer: Yasushi Akimoto

Nogizaka46 singles chronology
| "Girls' Rule" (2013) | "Barrette" (2013) | "Kizuitara Kataomoi" (2014) |

"Barrette" (Japanese: バレッタ, Hepburn: Baretta) is the 7th single by Nogizaka46. It was released on November 27, 2013. It debuted in number one on the weekly Oricon Singles Chart. It was the 14th best-selling single of the year in Japan. It has sold a total of 515,965 copies, as of July 28, 2014 (chart date). It reached number one on the Billboard Japan Hot 100. A song from the single, Tsuki no Ōkisa (月の大きさ), was the second opening theme of season 15 of the Naruto: Shippuden anime television series.

== Release ==
This single was released in 4 versions. Type-A, Type-B, Type-C and a regular edition. The center position in the choreography for the title song is held by Miona Hori who is a member of 2nd generation.

== Track listing ==
=== Type-A ===
CD
| No. | Title | Length |
|---|---|---|
| 1. | "Barrette" (バレッタ) | 4:19 |
| 2. | "Tsuki no Ōkisa" (月の大きさ) | 3:56 |
| 3. | "Watashi no Tame ni Dareka no Tame ni" (私のために 誰かのために) | 5:14 |
| 4. | "Barrette (off vocal ver.)" (バレッタ off vocal ver.) | 4:19 |
| 5. | "Tsuki no Ōkisa (off vocal ver.)" (月の大きさ off vocal ver.) | 3:56 |
| 6. | "Watashi no Tame ni Dareka no Tame ni (off vocal ver.)" (私のために 誰かのために off vocal ver.) | 5:13 |

DVD
| No. | Title | Length |
|---|---|---|
| 1. | "Barrette Music Video" |
| 2. | "Tsuki no Ōkisa Music Video" |
| 3. | "Erika Ikuta × Masahide Sakuma" |
| 4. | "Yūri Saitō × Atsuhiro Yamada" |
| 5. | "Kazumi Takayama × Taikou Nakayama" |
| 6. | "Seira Nagashima × Tatsurō Hayashi" |
| 7. | "Seira Hatanaka × Santa Yamagishi" |
| 8. | "Hina Higuchi × Ai Nagasaki" |
| 9. | "Miona Hori × Shō Yanagisawa" |
| 10. | "Sayuri Matsumura × Udai Iwasaki" |
| 11. | "Yumi Wakatsuki × ZUMI" |
| 12. | "Maaya Wada × Takayuki Hayashi" |
| 13. | "2nd generation members introduction 1" |

=== Type-B ===
CD
| No. | Title | Length |
|---|---|---|
| 1. | "Barrette" (バレッタ) | 4:19 |
| 2. | "Tsuki no Ōkisa" (月の大きさ) | 3:56 |
| 3. | "Sonna Baka na..." (そんなバカな・・・) | 4:29 |
| 4. | "Barrette (off vocal ver.)" (バレッタ off vocal ver.) | 4:19 |
| 5. | "Tsuki no Ōkisa (off vocal ver.)" (月の大きさ off vocal ver.) | 3:56 |
| 6. | "Sonna Baka na... (off vocal ver.)" (そんなバカな・・・ off vocal ver.) | 4:28 |

DVD
| No. | Title | Length |
|---|---|---|
| 1. | "Barrette Music Video" |
| 2. | "Sonna Baka na... Music Video" |
| 3. | "Rina Ikoma × Izuru Kumasaka" |
| 4. | "Nene Itō × Wataru Yamamoto" |
| 5. | "Sayuri Inoue × Masayuki Miyaji" |
| 6. | "Mahiro Kawamura × Ami Satō" |
| 7. | "Asuka Saitō × Fujimaru Totsuka" |
| 8. | "Chiharu Saitō × Nozomu Nakajima" |
| 9. | "Nanase Nishino × Yū Oorai・Tomoyuki Torisu" |
| 10. | "Ami Nōjō × Kazuma Ikeda" |
| 11. | "Nanami Hashimoto × Kazuya Nakajima・Hiroshi Kikuchi" |
| 12. | "Mai Fukagawa × Yoshiaki Marubayashi" |
| 13. | "2nd generation members introduction 2" |

=== Type-C ===
CD
| No. | Title | Length |
|---|---|---|
| 1. | "Barrette" (バレッタ) | 4:19 |
| 2. | "Tsuki no Ōkisa" (月の大きさ) | 3:56 |
| 3. | "Hatsukoi no Hito o Ima demo" (初恋の人を今でも) | 3:45 |
| 4. | "Barrette (off vocal ver.)" (バレッタ off vocal ver.) | 4:19 |
| 5. | "Tsuki no Ōkisa (off vocal ver.)" (月の大きさ off vocal ver.) | 3:56 |
| 6. | "Hatsukoi no Hito o Ima demo (off vocal ver.)" (初恋の人を今でも off vocal ver.) | 3:44 |

DVD
| No. | Title | Length |
|---|---|---|
| 1. | "Barrette Music Video" |
| 2. | "Hatsukoi no Hito o Ima demo Music Video" |
| 3. | "Manatsu Akimoto × Yūki Aoyama" |
| 4. | "Marika Itō × Hiroaki Yuasa" |
| 5. | "Misa Etō × Hideaki Fukui" |
| 6. | "Hina Kawago × Renki Yamasaki" |
| 7. | "Reika Sakurai × Tarō Okagawa" |
| 8. | "Mai Shiraishi × Ray (Fashion Magazine)" |
| 9. | "Kana Nakada × Subong Kim" |
| 10. | "Himeka Nakamoto × Makoto Ishida" |
| 11. | "Minami Hoshino × Takurō Ōkubo" |
| 12. | "Rina Yamato × Hironobu Tōkai" |
| 13. | "2nd generation members introduction 3" |
| 14. | "Rena Ichiki" |

=== Regular Edition ===
CD
| No. | Title | Lyrics | Music | Artist(s) | Length |
|---|---|---|---|---|---|
| 1. | "Barrette" (バレッタ) | Yasushi Akimoto | Yoshihiro Saito | Miona Hori, et cetera | 4:19 |
| 2. | "Tsuki no Ōkisa" (月の大きさ) | Yasushi Akimoto | Takahiro Furukawa | Miona Hori, et cetera | 3:56 |
| 3. | "Yasashisa towa" (やさしさとは) | Yasushi Akimoto | Takahiro Furukawa | Nanami Hashimoto, et cetera | 4:42 |
| 4. | "Barrette (off vocal ver.)" (バレッタ off vocal ver.) | | Yoshihiro Saito | | 4:19 |
| 5. | "Tsuki no Ōkisa (off vocal ver.)" (月の大きさ off vocal ver.) | | Takahiro Furukawa | | 3:56 |
| 6. | "Yasashisa towa (off vocal ver.)" (やさしさとは off vocal ver.) | | Takahiro Furukawa | | 4:40 |

=== Anime Edition ===
CD
| No. | Title | Length |
|---|---|---|
| 1. | "Barrette" (バレッタ) |
| 2. | "Tsuki no Ōkisa" (月の大きさ) |
| 3. | "Tsuki no Ōkisa (Anime ver.)" (月の大きさ ～アニメ版～) |
| 4. | "Barrette (off vocal ver.)" (バレッタ off vocal ver.) |
| 5. | "Tsuki no Ōkisa (off vocal ver.)" (月の大きさ off vocal ver.) |

== Participating members ==
=== Barrette ===
3rd Row: Marika Itō, Misa Etō, Asuka Saitō, Manatsu Akimoto, Mai Fukagawa, Himeka Nakamoto, Hina Kawago, Kazumi Takayama

2nd Row: Reika Sakurai, Erika Ikuta, Rina Ikoma, Yumi Wakatsuki

1st Row: Nanase Nishino, Mai Shiraishi, Miona Hori (centre), Nanami Hashimoto, Sayuri Matsumura

== Chart and certifications ==
=== Weekly charts ===
| Chart (2014) | Peak position |
|---|---|
| Japan (Oricon Weekly Singles Chart) | 1 |
| Japan (Billboard Japan Hot 100) | 1 |

=== Year-end charts ===
| Chart (2014) | Peak position |
|---|---|
| Japan (Oricon Yearly Singles Chart) | 66 |

=== Certifications ===
| Region | Certification | Certified units/sales |
|---|---|---|
| Japan (RIAJ) | 2× Platinum | 500,000^{^} |
^{^} Shipments figures based on certification alone.
