= Nico Touches the Walls discography =

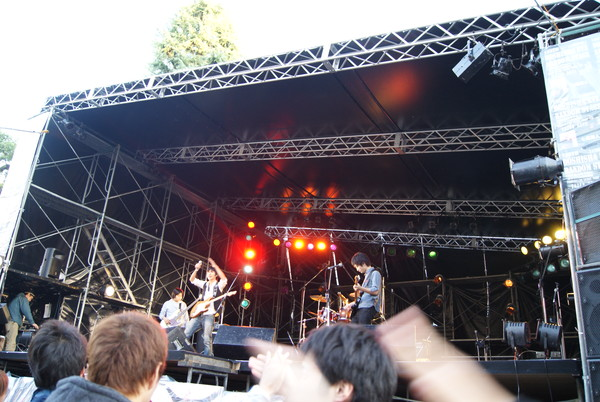
- NICO Touches the Walls performing in 2010
- Studio albums: 8
- Extended plays: 5
- Compilation albums: 1
- Singles: 27
- Video albums: 7
- Music videos: 26
- Promotional singles: 7

The discography of the Japanese band Nico Touches the Walls consists of eight studio albums, 27 extended plays, eleven singles, seven promotional singles, seven video albums, and 26 music videos.

Nico Touches the Walls (stylized as NICO Touches the Walls) was a Japanese rock band formed in 2004. In the same year, they won the Lotte Prize at the Yamaha Teen Music Festival. Rising quickly, they signed to "Senha & Co." before signing to Sony Music Japan's Ki/oon Records in 2007. Their debut single, "Yoru no Hate" was released in February 2008, and received a positive reaction from the public.

The band has also had songs used in anime, such as "Broken Youth", "Diver", and "Niwaka Ame ni mo Makezu", in Naruto Shippuden, "Hologram" in Fullmetal Alchemist: Brotherhood, and "Matryoshka" in C.

== Albums ==
=== Studio albums ===
Title	Album details	Peak chart positions		Sales
Title	Album details	Oricon Chart	Billboard Japan	Sales
Who are you?	Released: September 28, 2008; Label: Kio/on Records; Formats: CD, digital download	11	-	
Aurora	Released: November 25, 2009; Label: Kio/on Records; Formats: CD, digital download	17	-	Japan: 11,322
Passenger	Released: April 4, 2011; Label: Kio/on Records; Formats: CD, digital download	15	16	Japan: 12,965
Humania	Released: December 7, 2011; Label: Kio/on Records; Formats: CD, digital download	10	-	Japan: 15,104
Shout to the Walls!	Released: April 24, 2013; Label: Kio/on Records; Formats: CD, digital download	5	-	
Howdy! We are ACO Touches the Walls	Released: February 5, 2015; Label: Kio/on Records; Formats: CD, digital download	10	-	
Yuuki mo Ai mo Nai Nante	Released: March 16, 2016; Label: Kio/on Records; Formats: CD	5	6	
Quizmaster	Released: June 5, 2019; Label: Kio/on Records; Formats: CD, download	12	—	JPN: 5,667

=== Compilation albums ===
Title	Album details	Peak chart positions		Sales
Title	Album details	Oricon Chart	Billboard Japan	Sales
NICO Touches the Walls no Best	Released: February 5, 2014; Label: Kio/on Records; Formats: CD, digital download	5	—	

=== Extended plays ===
Title	Album details	Peak chart positions		Sales
Title	Album details	Oricon Chart	Billboard Japan	Sales
Walls Is Beginning	Released: February 2, 2006; Label: Kio/on Records; Formats: CD	-	-	
runova x handover	Released: October 18, 2006; Label: Kio/on Records; Formats: CD	229	-	
How are you?	Released: November 21, 2007; Label: Kio/on Records; Formats: CD, digital download	127	-	
Oyster -EP-	Released: December 6, 2017; Label: Kio/on Records; Formats: CD	-	-	
Twister -EP-	Released: July 25, 2018; Label: Kio/on Records; Formats: CD	-	-	

== Singles ==
- "アボガド" (September 6, 2006)
- "(My Sweet)Eden" (June 13, 2007)
- "Yoru no Hate" (February 20, 2008)
- "The Bungy" (June 4, 2008)
- "Broken Youth" (August 13, 2008)
- "Big Foot" (May 13, 2009)
- "Hologram" (August 12, 2009)
- "Kakera: Subete no Omoitachi e" (November 4, 2009)
- "Sudden Death Game" (August 11, 2010)
- "Diver" (January 12, 2011)
- "Te o Tatake" (August 17, 2011)
- "Natsu no Daisankakkei" (May 16, 2012)
- "Natsu no Daisankakkei (2012 Live In Makuhari)" (August 1, 2012)
- "Yume 1 Go" (December 19, 2012)
- "Mr. Echo" (March 27, 2013)
- "Niwaka Ame ni Mo Makezu" (July 10, 2013)
- "Rawhide" (March 5, 2014)
- "Tenchi Gaeshi (TV Size)" (April 30, 2014)
- "Tenchi Gaeshi" (June 11, 2014)
- "バケモノ" (July 1, 2014)
- "TOKYO Dreamer (TV Size)" (August 13, 2014)
- "TOKYO Dreamer" (August 20, 2014)
- "Massuguna Uta" (July 19, 2015)
- "Uzu to Uzu" (September 2, 2015)
- "Strato" (May 3, 2016)
- "渦と渦 ~西の渦~ Live At 大阪城ホール" (June 1, 2016)
- "Mashi Mashi" (November 30, 2016)
- "Vibrio Vulnificus" (July 14, 2018)
