= Tour 2012 "Algorhytmique" =

- National tour by Nico Touches the Walls
- Location: Japan
- Start date: September 27, 2012
- End date: December 20, 2012
- Legs: 1
- No. of shows: 26

Nico Touches the Walls concert chronology
- Tour 2012 Humania / Ground of Humania (2012); Tour 2012 "Algorhytmique" (2012); TOUR 2013 "Shout to the Walls!" (2013)

The Tour 2012 "Algorhytmique" was the fifth national tour by Japanese band Nico Touches the Walls. Started on September 27, 2012 and ended on December 20, being the band's longest tour of career.

== Set list ==
Regular set list
1. "Big Foot"
2. "Diver"
3. "Carousel"
4. "Survive"
5. "Yudachi March"
6. "Sokudo"
7. "Kimi Dake"
8. "Fujin"
9. "Yogisha"
10. "Hologram"
11. "Me"
12. "Rappa to Musume"
13. "Te o Tatake"
14. "Yume 1 Go"
15. "The Bungy"
16. "Bicycle"
17. "Natsu no Daisankakkei"
18. "Kabe"
19. "N Kyoku to N Kyoku"

== Tour dates ==
Date	City	Venue
September 27, 2012	Osaka	Namba Hatch
September 30, 2012	Shizuoka	Sound Shower Ark
October 2, 2012	Tokyo	Shibuya AX
October 7, 2012	Mito	Mito Lighthouse
October 11, 2012	Takasaki, Gunma	Club Fleez
October 13, 2012	Niigata	Niigata Lots
October 14, 2012	Nagano	Club Junk Box
October 18, 2012	Shiga	Stone
October 19, 2012	Nara	Never Land
October 21, 2012	Tottori	Yonago Laughs
October 23, 2012	Kochi	X-pt
October 26, 2012	Oita	Drum Be-0
October 28, 2012	Kagoshima	Caparvo Hall (Postponed until November 20)
November 1, 2012	Morioka, Iwate	Club Change Wave
November 3, 2012	Hakodate	Club Cocoa
November 16, 2012	Tokyo	Zepp Tokyo
November 20, 2012	Kagoshima	Caparvo Hall
November 22, 2012	Hiroshima	Club Quattro
November 22, 2012	Fukuoka	Zepp Fukuoka
November 30, 2012	Nagoya	Zepp Nagoya
December 2, 2012	Sapporo	Factory Hall
December 4, 2012	Sendai, Miyagi	Rensa
December 17, 2012	Tokyo	NHK Hall
December 20, 2012	Osaka	Orix Theater
