= Tour 2013 "Shout to the Walls!" =

Concert tour by Nico Touches the Walls

Nico Touches the Walls Tour 2013 "Shout to the Walls!"
- National tour by Nico Touches the Walls
- Location: Japan
- Associated album: Shout to the Walls!
- Start date: May 16, 2013
- End date: July 11, 2013
- Legs: 1
- No. of shows: 12

Nico Touches the Walls concert chronology
- Tour 2012 "Algorhytmique" (2012); Tour 2013 Shout to the Walls! (2013)

The Tour 2013 "Shout to the Walls!" is a national and first hall tour by Japanese band Nico Touches the Walls, sponsored by New Balance, to promote their fifth studio album "Shout to the Walls", released on April 24, 2013. The tour started on May 16 and ended on July 11, 2013.

== Set list ==
Regular set list
1. "Kodou"
2. "Natsu no Daisankakkei"
3. "Nashi no Hana"
4. "Bicycle"
5. "damed goods ~Shien Chinkonka~"
6. "Strawberry Girl"
7. "Avocado"
8. "Te wo Tatake"
9. "Akai Tsume"
10. "Kabe"
11. "Arpeggio"
12. "Yume 1 Go"
13. "Abidhalma"
14. "Yunjou Sanka"
15. "Chain Reaction"
16. "Broken Youth"
17. "(who)"
18. "Mr.ECHO"
19. "Niwaka Ame ni Mo Makezu"
20. "Runner"

== Tour dates ==
Date	Location	Venue
May 16, 2013	Shizuoka	Shizuoka City Culture Hall
May 18, 2013	Fukuoka	Fukuoka Sunplace
May 19, 2013	Hiroshima	Hiroshima Aster Plaza Great Hall
May 25, 2013	Osaka	Orix Theater
May 26, 2013	Osaka	Orix Theater
June 2, 2013	Sapporo	Sapporo Education and Culture Hall
June 7, 2013	Ichikawa, Chiba	Ichikawa City Cultural Hall
June 9, 2013	Niigata	Niigata Prefectural Civic Center
June 21, 2013	Sendai	Sendai Shinmin Hall
June 30, 2013	Aichi Prefecture	Aichi Arts Center
July 10, 2013	Tokyo	NHK Hall
July 11, 2013	Tokyo	NHK Hall
