= Humania =

Humania may refer to:

- Humania (communication project), a communication project with development purposes
- Humania (album), a 2011 album by Nico Touches the Walls
