= List of Lagrange: The Flower of Rin-ne episodes =

Lagrange: The Flower of Rin-ne (輪廻のラグランジェ Flower declaration of your heart, Rinne no Raguranje) is a 2012 Japanese anime television series produced by Xebec and Production I.G. Set in Kamogawa, the series revolves around Madoka Kyouno, Fin E Ld Si Laffinty (Lan) and Muginami, who all come from different worlds and attend the Kamogawa Girls' High School. While they form the Jersey Club to fulfill tasks for other school clubs, they are also destined to pilot strange robotic aircraft known as Vox Units, supported by a military organization named Novumundus stationed at an offshore base called Pharos. Their ultimate mission is to cease the intergalactic war between neighboring planets called Le Garite and De Metrio, in an attempt to restore the friendship between the planets' respective leaders named Dizelmine and Villagulio.

The first season of the anime by Production I.G and Xebec aired in Japan from January 8, 2012, to March 24, 2012. The first episode was pre-aired on January 1, 2012. A second season aired in Japan between July 1, 2012, and September 23, 2012. The anime has been licensed for streaming in North America by Viz Media and in the UK by Anime on Demand. The respective opening and ending themes are "Try Unite!" and "Hello!", both performed by Megumi Nakajima. For the second season, the opening theme is "Marble" (マーブル, Māburu) by Nakajima whilst the ending themes are "Jersey Club Spirit!" (ジャージ部魂, Jāji-bu Tamashī) by Kaori Ishihara, Asami Seto and Ai Kayano and "Don't Forget Me" (忘れないよ。, Wasurenai yo) by Nakajima. An original video animation, titled Rinne no Lagrange: Kamogawa Days (輪廻のラグランジェ: 鴨川デイズ, Rinne no Reguranje: Kamogawa Deizu), was released alongside a PlayStation 3 game on Blu-ray Hybrid Disc on August 23, 2012, having previously received an advance screening in ten theaters on June 23, 2012.

== Episode list ==
=== Season 1 ===
No.	Title	Original release date
1	"Welcome to Kamogawa!"; Transliteration: "Yōkoso, Kamogawa e!" (Japanese: ようこそ、鴨川へ!)	January 8, 2012
While enjoying the fresh morning air at the beach on the way to school, Madoka Kyouno spots a drowning girl in the distance. Madoka manages to rescue the girl, but ends up misplacing her school uniform. As a solo member of the Jersey Club, Madoka participates in various club activities after school, including tennis and kendo. While Madoka walks home, a strange girl returns her school uniform. Later that night, Madoka is questioned by her cousin, Youko Nakaizumi, as to whether or not she likes Kamogawa. The next day, Madoka once again meets the strange girl, who introduces herself as Fin E Ld Si Laffinty, nicknamed Lan, asking Madoka to pilot a robotic aircraft known as an Ovid at an offshore base called Pharos. As Madoka touches the Ovid and experiences an unusual flashback, rebel organization Kiss member named Array, piloting the Ovid Teneritas, appears from outer space and attacks Pharos. Lan reveals herself to be an alien from the planet Le Graite sent to protect Madoka and her Ovid, the two of which are linked together. Madoka agrees to pilot her Ovid, which responds to her emotions and changes into a robotic form to fight against Array, defeating him using Madoka's knowledge of wrestling.
2	"Kamogawa Spirit"; Transliteration: "Kamogawa Supiritto" (Japanese: 鴨川スピリット)	January 15, 2012
Following the attack, Madoka is introduced to chief adviser Moid, who says that Madoka's Ovid is called the Vox Aura. Madoka is then shocked to learn from Shozo Tadokoro, fleet captain of the military organization Novumundus, that there will be more missions. As Madoka tries to return Youko's calls with no service while the Ovid Teneritas is being transported to the storage hangar, Moid and Tadokoro discuss how valuable Madoka is as the pilot of the Vox Aura. Madoka wanders off into the storage hangar, where she briefly runs into another Ovid pilot named Muginami, who seems to be looking for an exit. Lan finds Madoka in order for her to perform the next mission to fight against another Kiss member named Izo, piloting the Ovid Voluntas. As Madoka struggles against Izo, with her feelings of doubt causing the Vox Aura to shut down during battle, she receives a call from Youko, revealed as a marine biologist. Youko gives Madoka much needed words of encouragement to help her finish what she started. Madoka launches a counterattack on Izo, but yet another Kiss member named Kirius, piloting the Ovid Libertas, appears behind her. Madoka speculates this to be a pincer movement.
3	"Lan Blooms in Kamogawa"; Transliteration: "Kamogawa ni Ran no Hana Saku" (Japanese: 鴨川にランの花咲く)	January 22, 2012
Madoka rushes to fight against Kirius in order to protect her town. Lan becomes conflicted about a legend unaware to Madoka herself, which Moid has previously reminded Lan of her fear that prevents her from being able to pilot her own Ovid called the Vox Rympha. During the battle, Kirius pins down Madoka on a peanut farm, asking her to come to his planet, but she refuses and the fight resumes. Feeling that Madoka is in danger, Lan overcomes her fear and pilots the Vox Rympha, but finds herself up against Izo, who has resurfaced from the ocean. Lan expresses her guilt towards dragging Madoka into fighting against De Metrio Ovids, but Madoka lifts Lan's spirits. This enables Lan to overcome her fear and transform the Vox Rympha into its warrior mode, allowing her to come to Madoka's aid, forcing Kirius and Izo to retreat. After they thank each other for being there for one another, Madoka and Lan then decide to give new names to their Ovids, respectively Midori and Orca. It is shown that Array is being confined inside Pharos as he recites the legend foretold of the three colored demons, while Muginami has escaped from Pharos.
4	"The Swimmers of Kamogawa"; Transliteration: "Kamogawa Suimāzu" (Japanese: 鴨川スイマーズ)	January 29, 2012
Muginami transfers into Madoka's class, which causes worry for Tadokoro and Youko. With eventual convincing from Tadokoro and Youko, teacher Machiko Iwabuchi allows Madoka to continue piloting Midori only if she continues living at home and attending school. Soon afterwards, Madoka and Muginami participate in an annual high school open water swimming competition, while Lan keeps watch on an inflatable boat. Muginami spots Lan and plays a prank by tipping her into the ocean, unaware that Lan is unable to swim. Realizing her mistake, Muginami assists Madoka in rescuing Lan and performs cardiopulmonary resuscitation, forcefully compressing Lan's chest and passionately giving her mouth to mouth resuscitation. Madoka invites Muginami to join the Jersey Club, much to Lan's annoyance. Both Muginami and Lan decide to work part-time at the Be With Hiroshi restaurant, owned by Madoka's uncle Hiroshi Nakaizumi, due to their polar opposite traits attracting many customers. When Madoka allows Muginami to live with her, a jealous Lan also decides to transfer into Madoka's class, join the Jersey Club and start living with Madoka. Meanwhile, a technical glitch in the Pharos security system allows Array to make a quick getaway in the Ovid Teneritas and rejoin his allies.
5	"The Man Who Came to Kamogawa"; Transliteration: "Kamogawa ni Kita Otoko" (Japanese: 鴨川に来た男)	February 5, 2012
Muginami makes an exquisite breakfast for Madoka, Lan and Hiroshi, eventually persuading that she made the meal especially for Lan. At school after baseball practice, Lan warns Madoka that Muginami may be a threat, despite her cheerful demeanor. Machiko gives Madoka, Lan and Muginami access to a storage room for their Jersey Club. Later, Madoka catches Hiroshi drinking with a male stranger at the beach, and she sends Hiroshi on an errand before realizing that the stranger wanted the last coat at a thrift store. Meanwhile, Lan learns that Muginami wanted to obtain an Ovid called the Vox Ignis for her brother, who will be arriving shortly. After some beach cleaning, Madoka and the stranger go to the Be With Hiroshi restaurant. Muginami enters afterwards, as it is revealed that the stranger is her brother, but not by blood. Lan recognizes him as Villagulio, being associated with Kiss. Muginami says that she is on Villagulio's side despite all the good times that she experienced with Madoka and Lan. However, Villagulio soon turns against Muginami for taking the Vox Ignis for herself. Hiroshi restrains an angry Madoka from punching Villagulio, who then retreats while piloting an Ovid called the Avarium.
6	"Wind, Fire, and Water Above Kamogawa"; Transliteration: "Kaze to Hi to Mizu to Kamogawa to" (Japanese: 風と火と水と鴨川と)	February 12, 2012
Madoka storms out the Be With Hiroshi restaurant with a vengeance, asking Hiroshi to look after a tearful Muginami. After Tadokoro tells Madoka and Lan to be on standby, Tadokoro develops a plan for the impending attack to be safely launched over the ocean. Villagulio introduces Kirius and Izo to an energy drink in their spaceship, while Madoka also introduces Lan to the same energy drink at the base, as they all prepare for battle. The battle unexpectedly takes place in the atmosphere before dawn, but Villagulio surrounds Madoka and Lan with an army of De Metrio Ovids. Moid convinces Muginami to pilot the Vox Ignis and charge through the army to get to Villagulio. Muginami blocks the path of Madoka when the latter tries to get to Villagulio first, berating Madoka's selfish act in taking revenge. As Madoka argues back at Muginami, a strange occurrence causes mysterious green flowers known as Lagrange to rain from the sky, blossoming the realm of the "Rin-ne".
7	"Cloudy Skies, Followed by Kamogawa"; Transliteration: "Kumori nochi Kamogawa" (Japanese: 曇り のち 鴨川)	February 19, 2012
On a water taxi, Lan talks with Madoka, who has becomes conflicted about Muginami's actions. Meanwhile, Muginami is discharged from the hospital, while Moid and Tadokoro discuss how Muginami comes from a remote penal colony that did not sign a human rights treaty. Madoka is shocked to learn from Lan that Villagulio was a former crowned prince of De Metrio. In the past, Villagulio was very close with Muginami, as they were both very fond of apples. In the present, Machiko enlists Madoka and Lan to help gather eels from the school swimming pool. Madoka then finds Muginami in a classroom and lets out a sneeze, prompting the two to take a hot bath at home. After Muginami talks about how Villagulio first came into her life when she was younger, Madoka apologizes and embraces Muginami. At night, when Muginami attempts to leave, Lan stops her and Madoka tries to convince her to stay. The three of them decide to bathe in the ocean together. The next day, after trying on maid outfits for Hiroshi, the three of them rush off to school.
8	"A Lolita in Kamogawa"; Transliteration: "Kamogawa Rorīta" (Japanese: 鴨川ロリータ)	February 25, 2012
Asteria Lizamarie de Roschefall, the granddaughter of the chairman of Novumundus, arrives at Pharos and greets Tadokoro and the Vox pilots. She questions Madoka about the strange occurrence that happened in the sky after confronting Muginami. While the Vox pilots hang out at a water park, Asteria speaks with Youko about the Vox Units. Lan tells Madoka about the Vox legend, in which an incident involving the Vox Units nearly destroyed the world 20,000 years ago. Asteria also has a discussion with Youko, Moid and Tadokoro about the same Vox legend in an office. At home, Madoka, Lan and Muginami sleep in the same room to be safe. The next day, Asteria decides to ban Madoka from piloting Midori in battle, prompting Lan and Muginami to lock themselves in the storage hangar as a protest. However, with Asteria tagging along, Madoka enters the storage hangar through an air duct, convincing Lan and Muginami to stop their protest and accept her ban. Asteria later goes to see Villagulio, Kirius, Izo and Array. Villagulio demands Asteria to surrender the Vox Units to him, but she refuses to do so, stating that the flower of Lagrange must never be allowed to blossom again.
9	"Departing Katsuura, Heading to Kamogawa"; Transliteration: "Katsūra Hatsu → Kamogawa Yuki" (Japanese: 勝浦発→鴨川行)	March 3, 2012
As the Jersey Club prepares for the upcoming annual Oraga Arts Festival at the school, Kirius, Izo and Array sit idly by in Katsuura as they each recount being defeated by Madoka, though reminded that she is banned from piloting Midori. Izo soon becomes inspired by a samurai television drama with a desire to challenge Madoka to a duel. He travels to Kamogawa, prompting Kirius and Array to find and stop him. Kirius and Array arrive at the beach, where Kirius witnesses Madoka saving a boy from drowning and Array is forced to work for Hiroshi for the day to prevent a "dine and dash" scenario. As Izo ends up at the school and mistaken by the kendo club as Madoka's boyfriend, he is told how Madoka was inspired by Youko to join the Jersey Club after her mother died in the ocean trying to save someone from drowning. After hearing the story, Izo decides to leave before Madoka arrives. Kirius, Izo and Array return to Katsuura, where Villagulio is playing a dance video game. Villagulio gives the three of them the ultimatum of either joining him or leaving him, but only he will destroy the Vox Units.
10	"Goodbye, Kamogawa"; Transliteration: "Saraba Kamogawa" (Japanese: さらば鴨川)	March 10, 2012
On the day of the Oraga Arts Festival, Lan and Muginami must keep a secret from Madoka, concerning a mission given to the two of them by Tadokoro. Madoka, Lan and Muginami visit many stalls they have helped with, including a haunted house, some food stalls, a movie poster and a photo booth. After they find Asteria in the arcade, Sachi Nogami and Michi Kondou each request Lan and Muginami to assist with their respective club stalls. Madoka escorts Asteria around the festival, in which Asteria consumes grilled eel for the first time. Muginami is with Michi at the astronomy club's planetary maid cafe, while Lan is with Sachi at the surf club's hall of fame. Madoka expresses her depression to Asteria at the thought of Lan and Muginami making new friends. However, Madoka learns from Asteria about the assault that Lan and Muginami are making and decides to go after them. Lan and Muginani launch their Vox Units, just as Madoka travels by boat towards Pharos. Meanwhile, Kirius, Izo and Array decide to join Villagulio, but not follow his orders.
11	"Kamogawa's Last Line of Defense"; Transliteration: "Kamogawa Zettai Bōei Rain" (Japanese: 鴨川絶対防衛ライン)	March 17, 2012
As Madoka approaches Pharos, Midori reacts to her presence and transmits her thoughts only to Lan and Muginami, as Lan tries to convince Tadokoro to lift the ban for Madoka, but to no avail. In outer space, the first wave of the De Metrio fleet, led by Villagulio's right-hand woman Grania, attacks Lan, while Muginami is up against Villagulio. The second wave of the De Metrio fleet then attacks Pharos. As Youko reveals concrete research of what happened 20,000 years ago as well as power of "three", Youko manages to convince Asteria to lift Madoka's ban, allowing Madoka to fly up to assist Lan and Muginami. After Grania commands the De Metrio fleet to fire at the school, it is then that Kirius, Izo and Array stand to protect it. Just as the girls gain an advantage, Youko gets critically injured on top of Michi when a De Metrio Ovid lands on the school's track and field. This causes a devastated Madoka to make all three Vox Units bloom green, blue and orange Lagrange flowers against their will.
12	"Until We Meet Again, In Kamogawa"; Transliteration: "Mata Itsu no Hi ka, Kamogawa de" (Japanese: またいつの日か、鴨川で)	March 24, 2012
Two weeks later, the town learns that alien civilizations exist and that Lan is the crowned princess of Le Garite. Lan is soon due to return to her home planet. Going up to the Hill of Vows to place a padlock under a goddess statue, Madoka and Lan make a promise that they, along with Muginami, will meet up again in Kamogawa before parting ways. In the past, after the Lagrange flowers bloomed, a large energy field appeared in the sky. Madoka found herself subconsciously speaking to Yurikano, who told Madoka to follow her own path. A motivated Madoka regained control of Midori and changed the energy field into a Lagrange flower with the help of Lan and Muginami. As Madoka learned that Youko is still alive, Midori suddenly shut down and Villagulio targeted Madoka. However, Villagulio was stopped by the arrival of the Le Garite army, led by Dizelmine, prompting Muginami to leave with Villagulio in order to save him. In the present, Madoka and Lan say farewell to each other. Moid is revealed as an observer for Dizelmine. As autumn approaches, Asteria reveals her memoria imprinted on her chest to Youko, while Madoka receives a letter from Muginami.
OVA	"Kamogawa Days"; Transliteration: "Kamogawa Deizu" (Japanese: 鴨川デイズ)	August 23, 2012
As Youko and her assistant Souta Serizawa scour the seabed for an ancient stone tablet, Asteria dismisses Madoka for New Year's Day, since Madoka cannot properly activate Midori. Upon returning home in Kamogawa, Madoka is greeted by her classmates Sachi and Michi. At the Be With Hiroshi restaurant, Kirius, Izo and Array are now working as waiters. Madoka promptly replies to the New Year's Day letters received from Lan and Muginami. As Valentine's Day approaches, Madoka, Sachi and Michi bring in bags of chocolates for Kirius, Izo and Array. Later on, Madoka, Sachi and Michi move up a grade level in Machiko's homeroom class. Meanwhile, Lan and Muginami each visit an intergalactic replica of Kamogawa on the tourist planet Polyhedron. They eventually run into each other and decide to search for a present for Madoka's birthday, happening on May 11, before parting ways once again. During the school's annual sports festival, Asteria arranges a transmission to be viewed across outer space so that Madoka can show Lan and Muginami that everyone is doing fine. As Madoka's birthday arrives, she receives a matching hairband as her gift from Lan and Muginami before her friends and family throw her a surprise party.

=== Season 2 ===
No.	Title	Original release date
0	"Kamogawa Memoria"; Transliteration: "Kamogawa Memoria" (Japanese: 鴨川メモリア)	July 1, 2012
Youko Nakaizumi, Shozo Tadokoro and Asteria Lizamarie de Roschefall each recall the events of the first season from their perspectives.
1	"Welcome Back to Kamogawa!"; Transliteration: "Okaeri, Kamogawa!" (Japanese: おかえり、鴨川!)	July 8, 2012
Contemplating on her last battle from a year ago, Madoka Kyouno has a career counseling session meeting with Machiko Iwabuchi. At a space station, Dizelmine and Moid conduct experiments on Lan while she is inside Orca. Suddenly, Muginami, piloting Hupo, leads an army of De Metrio Ovids to attack the space station, forcing Lan and the Le Garite army to retreat. The next day, Kirius, Izo and Array serve customers for Hiroshi Nakaizumi at the Be With Hiroshi restaurant, while Madoka saves a girl from drowning in the ocean. After talking with Sachi Nogami and Michi Kondou about aliens and career planning, Madoka wonders when Lan and Muginami will return to Kamogawa. The following day, Pharos appears in Kamogawa again for an intergalactic conference. Madoka finally reunites with Lan, who takes Madoka to Pharos so she can pilot Midori again. Muginami pilots Hupo and approaches Pharos, intending to stop Madoka from piloting Midori. However, Lan pilots Orca and engages Muginami in battle, believing that Muginami intends to kill Madoka. As Madoka objects to this, she manages to activate Midori again and enters the fray.
2	"Mayhem on Kamogawa Beach"; Transliteration: "Kamogawa Bōsō Bīchi" (Japanese: 鴨川ボーソービーチ)	July 15, 2012
Madoka rushes to stop Lan and Muginami from quarreling, though she has trouble piloting Midori in the process. However, Madoka hears Lan and Muginami's thoughts, revealing their desire not to fight each other. Madoka fails to understand why Lan and Muginami must fight. Lan and Muginami go into hiding upon the arrival of the Le Garite platoon, and Madoka once again loses control of Midori. Asteria discusses with Tadokoro and Eri Watabe that the stellar systems of Le Garite and De Metrio are set in a collision course with each other, but only Midori has the power to destroy one of the planets. Madoka searches all over Kamogawa for Lan and Muginami, even using Kirius's Ovid Libertas to contact Villagulio and Grania. Both Lan and Muginami are drawn towards the Jersey Club storage room, where they each explain their reasons for protecting Madoka. As Madoka finds them, she hears their troubles over the war between their planets. Madoka gets them to kiss each other and make up before reforming the club, saying that the three of them can work together to get Dizelmine and Villagulio to become friends again. Asteria later tells Lan and Muginami to seek asylum on Earth.
3	"The Kamogawa Experiment"; Transliteration: "Kamogawa Ekusuperimento" (Japanese: 鴨川エクスペリメント)	July 22, 2012
Madoka is oblivious when she steals customers away from the haunted house designed by Kirius, Izo and Array. Asteria has a meeting with Tadokoro and Watabe, concerning the Vox Particle Control Experiment, the one attempted on Lan at the space station. The news reports that an intergalactic conference will take place in Kamogawa in one week. Before the summit, Asteria summons Madoka, Lan and Muginami at Pharos to discuss the experiment. Once Asteria shows them a picture of the Rubin vase, she explains that she wants to figure out a way to use the power of the Vox Units in a peaceful way in order to put Dizelmine and Villagulio off their plans. Madoka agrees to undergo the experiment, and Asteria manages to prompt a reaction from Madoka by embarrassing her after initial attempts show no results. When Dizelmine and Villagulio simultaneously contact Pharos, the experiment is ordered to cease. However, Madoka's levels continue to rise, causing a mysterious red fog to appear in the atmosphere and forming strange creatures. Meanwhile, Madoka is haunted by visions of Yurikano, warning her not to open the Rin-ne. When Madoka regains her senses, she is surrounded by destroyed creatures and bloomed Lagrange flowers.
4	"A Reunion in Kamogawa"; Transliteration: "Saikai no Machi, Kamogawa" (Japanese: 再会の街、鴨川)	July 29, 2012
At Pharos, Madoka expresses worry to Lan and Muginami about what happened during the experiment. As Dizelmine and Villagulio each arrive at Pharos for the intergalactic conference, Asteria arranges for them to be trapped in an elevator to have their discussion. Madoka, Lan and Muginami watch the security cameras, before Tadokoro, Moid and Grania arrive to listen in. The discussion mostly revolves around Madoka and Midori. Meanwhile, a Le Garite Ovid crash-lands into Kamogawa, whose pilot is revealed to be Yurikano, recognized as the princess of De Metrio and Villagulio's blood sister. After Yurikano is taken into custody onto Pharos, Dizelmine explains to Villagulio that Yurikano was rescued from the Tragedy of Militia Zodia, but she incurred amnesia in the process. Villagulio is frustrated when Yurikano refuses to leave with him, and she clings onto Dizelmine instead. Madoka approaches Yurikano, recognizing her as the same girl from the visions. However, Yurikano has no clue what Madoka is talking about. In order for Madoka to prove herself, Lan manages to sneak Madoka and Muginami aboard Dizelmine's spaceship back to Le Garite.
5	"In Orbit Above the Summer Skies of Kamogawa"; Transliteration: "Kamogawa Jōkū Eisei Kidō Nite - Natsu" (Japanese: 鴨川上空衛星軌道にて・夏)	August 5, 2012
With Madoka, Lan and Muginami aboard Dizelmine's spaceship, Dizelmine treats the girls to a meal. He explains that since the Tragedy of Militia Zodia caused Yurikano to incur amnesia, he kept it a secret from Lan. After the girls privately talk about Dizelmine, Madoka is brought by Dizelmine to a private garden, where he shares his morals of protecting his people even if it means to fight against his friend Villagulio. Dizelmine takes Madoka to a chamber, where Yurikano is already hooked up. The actual plan is for Dizelmine and Moid to implant Madoka's mind into Yurikano's body. When Lan realizes what is going on, she devises a plan to give a long speech to distract the Le Garite troops, buying Muginami enough time to break into the chamber and rescue Madoka. Meanwhile, as Madoka and Yurikano meet again in subconscious state, Madoka feels that Yurikano should not need to sacrifice herself for other people. Madoka fights Yurikano to convince her to tell Dizelmine and Villagulio how she truly feels. As the Le Garite spaceship starts to become covered in a red crystal anomaly, Yurikano wakes up in Madoka's body while the Vox Units automatically launch from Pharos.
6	"May This Voice Reach Kamogawa"; Transliteration: "Kamogawa ni mo Todoke, Kono Koe" (Japanese: 鴨川にも届け、この声)	August 12, 2012
As Yurikano and Madoka wake up and discover that they have switched bodies, Muginami ends up taking Yurikano away before an explanation can be made. Kirius, Izo and Array battle against the Le Garite forces, while the Vox Units arrive to save Lan, Muginami and Yurikano from the red crystal anomaly, although Midori leaves Yurikano behind after learning that she is not really Madoka. As Madoka is forced into an escape pod, Yurikano hijacks a Le Garite Ovid and meets up with Kirius, Izo and Array to fight off the Le Garite forces until Villagulio and the De Metrio forces arrive. Lan and Muginami then arrive to break up the fight, but Madoka inadvertently activates an emergency audio broadcast in her escape pod, transmitting her deduction that Yurikano is in love with Dizelmine. Just as Madoka is about to drift off into outer space, Midori rescues her and takes her straight to Dizelmine. Madoka and Yurikano then return to their original bodies, unbeknownst to Dizelmine, who admits his feelings to Yurikano before her. As the truth is brought to light, Yurikano lets go of her feelings for the safety of the universe, before disappearing into the Rin-ne once again.
7	"A Vow to Kamogawa"; Transliteration: "Kamogawa no Chikai" (Japanese: 鴨川の誓い)	August 19, 2012
After Madoka knocks some sense into Dizelmine and Villagulio, the two agree to work together to resolve the threat to their planets, announcing their unionship at the intergalactic conference being broadcast on television. The next day, Dizelmine and Villagulio depart after settling things with Lan and Muginami, which was a favor from Madoka. With Moid staying at Pharos, he discusses with Tadokoro concerning what caused the Vox Units to act on their own previously. After talking about Yurikano's feelings of love, Madoka, Lan and Muginami go to the Hill of Vows, this time vowing to never use their Vox Units as weapons again. As Youko and Souta Serizawa are trying to decipher a section of an ancient stone tablet, Asteria has a disturbing flashback. Youko later learns that Asteria was responsible for the tragedy that befell Earth 20,000 years ago. Madoka, Lan and Muginami continue their duties as the Jersey Club.
8	"Kamogawa Balloons"; Transliteration: "Kamogawa Ado Barūn" (Japanese: 鴨川アドバルーン)	August 26, 2012
Madoka, Lan and Muginami are told by student council member Shōko Igarashi that the Jersey Club storage room needs to be cleared out. Because the Jersey Club is not official, the only way to keep the storage room is to recruit a first year student. Reiko Miki is recruited into the Jersey Club, but she turns out to be a bit clumsy with theater, art and kendo. Meanwhile, Machiko meets up with Youko and tells her to free herself from the Jersey Club that she created in the past. The next day, Madoka learns that Reiko only joined the Jersey Club because she wants to pilot a robot like the others. Madoka, Lan and Muginami use the Tanada Night Festival, in which large Vox balloons are inflated, to show Reiko that they no longer use the Vox Units as weapons. To find what makes her happy, Reiko sends in a letter of resignation to the Jersey Club in favor of starting up a robot club. Elsewhere, as Asteria ponders the contradictions concerning the tragedy 20,000 years ago, Moid steals the stone tablet, storing it inside an artifact. Moid presents it to Dizelmine and reveals the memoria imprinted on his body.
9	"A White Kamogawa"; Transliteration: "Shiroi Kamogawa" (Japanese: 白い鴨川)	September 2, 2012
With the Jersey Club still active with requests, Madoka has to sort out her post-graduation plans as well as organize a farewell party for Kirius and Array, who are leaving for their home planet. Meanwhile, as Tadokoro, Watabe, Asteria, Youko, Souta, James Row and Haruka Uehara all investigate the whereabouts of Moid, it is then that Asteria tells the others about her involvement in the tragedy 20,000 years ago, revealing her real name to be Maycun, a former queen of Le Garite. Kirius and Array prepare to leave for their home planet, while Izo stays behind to perfect his skills as a chef. After a full day of fulfilling various requests, Madoka ends up suffering from a fever. As Lan and Muginami look after Madoka, the two worry about how to tell her that they intend to return to their home planets once they graduate. Madoka recovers and joins in the farewell party. Asteria contacts Villagulio, realizing that Moid is the Bridge of Neuenkirchen. Dizelmine undergoes the Vox Control Particle Experiment under Moid's suggestion. After Kirius and Array take their leave, the Le Garite fleet suddenly appears above Earth and a fallen De Metrio spaceship lands upon Kamogawa.
10	"Betrayal Over The Skies of Kamogawa"; Transliteration: "Uragiri no Sora wa Kamogawa" (Japanese: 裏切りの空は鴨川)	September 9, 2012
As the Le Garite fleet opens fire against the De Metrio fleet, Villagulio decides to personally confront Dizelmine to find out the reason for the betrayal. Madoka, Lan and Muginami decide to take up their Vox Units once more to investigate before Youko and Hiroshi sees them off. Izo, Array and Kirius each arrive in their Ovids and help fend off Dizelmine's guards off of Villagulio in his Avarium. Dizelmine reveals that he pilots the Magultol, a new form of the Vox Unit. Villagulio is overpowered by Dizelmine, but is saved by the arrival of Madoka, Lan and Muginami. As Madoka tries to get Dizelmine to answer her, his anger heightens and his Magultol changes form, firing off a wave of dark energy across Kamogawa, while a circle of purple Lagrange flowers appear around Earth. Dizelmine then proceeds to laugh maniacally and crush Villagulio's cockpit before opening up the skies, causing a mass of darkness to spread across Earth.
11	"Beyond the Seas of Kawogawa"; Transliteration: "Kamogawa no Umi no Mukōgawa" (Japanese: 鴨川の海の向こう側)	September 16, 2012
As the darkness continues to spread across Earth, Madoka, Lan and Muginami wake up separated in a strange place, similar to where Madoka first met Yurikano. Madoka, Lan and Muginami each come up against a vision of the Magultol and fight angrily against it. Meanwhile, after Moid admits to seeing the tragedy that Asteria caused 20,000 years ago, he reveals that he manipulated Dizelmine into opening the Rin-ne. Moid also explains his motives of giving himself to the Vox Unit directly, the reason behind the numerous memoria on his body. However, Youko gives Moid a prompt punishment for using Madoka in his scheme. As Madoka becomes demoralized over her inability to defeat Dizelmine, she is encouraged by Midori and is shown a vision of Dizelmine and Villagulio when they first became friends. After Madoka finds Lan and Muginami, they all regain their resolve. The three of them resume their battle against Dizelmine, aiming to make him remember the goals that he shared with Villagulio.
12	"Another Day in Kamogawa"; Transliteration: "Kyō mo Mata, Kamogawa de" (Japanese: 今日もまた, 鴨川で)	September 23, 2012
Those taking shelter at Pharos are having faith that the Vox pilots will pull through the darkness that befalls them. Madoka, Lan and Muginami find Dizelmine on the beach, where Yurikano is standing by him. The dark Rin-ne they were enclosed in soon collapses as a result of their will of changing Dizelmine's heart. As the Rin-ne soon starts to close, Madoka insists on taking Yurikano and Dizelmine with them. Madoka, Lan and Muginami soon arrive back in the real world, singing their triumphant Jersey Club anthem. This quells the black phenomenon into beautiful white Lagrange flowers, which drift off into outer space. Upon leaving the Rin-ne, Dizelmine reverts to a younger age, much like Asteria did. Yurikano reunites with Kirius, Izo and Array, while Moid mysteriously vanishes into thin air while struggling to enjoy a meal. After Madoka graduates from high school, she tells Youko about what happened ten years ago when Midori saved her from drowning, believing it to be a message from her mother. After Le Garite and De Metrio are finally at peace with each other, the Jersey Club later form branches on those planets, where Madoka, Lan and Muginami extend their services all over the universe.

=== Specials ===
The following are three-minute short episodes included on the BD/DVD releases.

No.	Title	Original release date
Special–1	"Kamogawa Girls Talk"; Transliteration: "Kamogawa Gāruzu Tōku" (Japanese: カモガワガールズトーク)	March 23, 2012
Madoka Kyouno and her classmates have a little girl talk, including the legend of the god of tai, taking a picture with the laughing seal at Kamogawa Seaworld, finishing the special menu at Kamohazu and the goddess statue of the Hill of Vows granting love.
Special–2	"Kamogawa Barehanded Blade Block"; Transliteration: "Kamogawa Ryū Shinken Shirahadori" (Japanese: かもがわ流真剣白刃取り)	April 20, 2012
Erika Takakura teaches Madoka and Lan how to block a kendo blade with their bare hands. As Madoka and Lan each fail at executing the block, Michi Kondou proves that she can do it, impressing Lan.
Special–3	"Kamogawa Pool Cleaning"; Transliteration: "Kamogawa Pūrusaido ni te" (Japanese: カモガワプールサイドにて)	May 25, 2012
Machiko Iwabuchi tasks the Jersey Club with cleaning the school swimming pool, where various items have sunk to the bottom. After cleaning up, Madoka finds an energy drink, but Lan pulls her hamstring while trying to pick up a stray rock with her foot.
Special–4	"Kamogawa Ghost"; Transliteration: "Kamogawa Gōsuto" (Japanese: かもがわゴースト)	June 22, 2012
Shozo Tadokoro tasks Madoka, Lan and Muginami to find a ghost supposedly a handsome guy roaming within Pharos. Although Lan stays behind, she joins Madoka and Muginami, bringing them protection against ghosts. It turns out that Moid was the ghost who was stealing food, and he repays them with dessert.
Special–5	"Kamogawa First Love Story"; Transliteration: "Kamogawa Hatsukoi Monogatari" (Japanese: カモガワ初恋物語)	July 27, 2012
While Erika scolds Shōko Igarashi for being distracted during kendo training, Izo attempts to return the jersey that he borrowed from Shōko. However, Machiko defeats Izo and returns the jersey to Shōko instead.
Special–6	"Kamogawa < Katsuura Days"; Transliteration: "Kamogawa < Katsuura Deizu" (Japanese: かもがわ＜かつうらデイズ)	August 24, 2012
Kirius, Izo and Array play a video game and a card game all day with each other. When Villagulio arrives, he has them eat the Kamohachi special for dinner, filled with curious delicacies.
Special–7	"Kamogawa Farmers"; Transliteration: "Kamogawa Fāmāzu" (Japanese: かもがわファーマーズ)	September 21, 2012
After Madoka has Asteria Lizamarie de Roschefall sample many dishes, Asteria realizes that the majestic ingredient above all ingredients is rice. Madoka, Lan, Muginami and Asteria work together to plant rice while keeping the crows away. As harvest approaches, Asteria receives her share of rice and is satisfied with the taste.
Special–8	"Bloody Kamogawa"; Transliteration: "Buraddi Kamogawa" (Japanese: ブラッディカモガワ)	October 26, 2012
Madoka and Muginami alert Hiroshi Nakaizumi that Lan's bedroom is flooded in blood, but Hiroshi clarifies that Lan just has a nosebleed, which explains the piles of tissue paper instead. Muginami tries casting a spell on Lan with just using a baby leaf and tickling her side, but that only irritates Lan. It turns out that Lan was just very touched by the taste of peanuts.
Special–9	"From Kamogawa to the U-Go Line"; Transliteration: "Kamogawa Hatsu → U Gō Yuki" (Japanese: カモガワ発→ウ・ゴー行)	November 22, 2012
While taking a bath, Muginami remembers when she got her gold heart necklace. When she was younger, Villagulio made a difficult decision to buy an apple for her to make an apple tart and the gold heart necklace to make her happy.
Special–10	"Kamogawa's Sweet Days"; Transliteration: "Kamogawa no Amai Tsuitachi" (Japanese: かもがわの甘い一日)	December 21, 2012
Hiroshi and Souta Serizawa suggest to Kirius, Izo and Array that the restaurant's burger menu needs to be updated. Taking Array's suggestion of sweets into consideration, Hiroshi comes up with tiger fish ice cream as a new menu item, but it turns out to be disgusting. When Youko Nakaizumi arrives, she is furious when the seafood being saved for a special occasion was used.
Special–11	"Memories of the Kamogawa Jersey Club"; Transliteration: "Kamogawa Bakutan! Jāji-bu Memorīzu" (Japanese: 鴨川爆誕！ジャージ部メモリーズ)	January 29, 2013
At a bar, Youko and Machiko look at high school photos of them when they were active in the Jersey Club. They also discuss how competitive they were during the sports festival, leading to them almost starting a swimming contest. However, Madoka halts them from going into the ocean, until they cross paths with a pelican worthy to catch.
Special–12	"Kamogawa Women's Jersey Club Theme Song"; Transliteration: "Kamogawa On'na Jāji-bu no Uta" (Japanese: 鴨川女ジャージ部のうた)	February 22, 2013
The film studies department of the high school creates a promotional video for the Jersey Club, featuring the triumphant anthem. The scenes include various duties that Madoka, Lan and Muginami are able to perform as a unit.
