= How Are You (disambiguation) =

"How Are You" is a 1985 song by The Kinks.

How Are You may also refer to:

- How Are You? (Joker Xue album), 2007
- How Are You? (Nico Touches the Walls album), 2007
- How Are You? (2009 film), a Turkish film
- "How Are You? John Morgan", a song resulted from "Here's your mule", a Confederate catchphrase during the American Civil War
- How Are You? (TV series), a 2019 Singaporean TV series
- "How Are You?" (EXID song), 2019
- "How Are You", a song by Jay Chou from the 2011 album Wow!
- How Are You? (2025 film), a French animated film
- Aap Kaise Ho (lit. 'How Are You'), a 2025 Indian film
- "Haal Kaise Hai Janab Ka" (lit. 'How Are You Gentleman'), a song by S. D. Burman, Asha Bhosle and Kishore Kumar from the 1958 Indian film Chalti Ka Naam Gaadi
- How Are You? It's Alan (Partridge) 2025 BBC comedy starring Steve Coogan
- How are you?, a Ukrainian mental health initiative

== See also ==
- How Do You Do (disambiguation)
- How You Been (disambiguation)
- How Have You Been (disambiguation)
