= How Do You Do =

How Do You Do may refer to:

== Music ==
=== Albums ===
- How Do You Do (Miyuki Nakajima album), 1984
- How Do You Do (Mayer Hawthorne album), 2011

=== Songs ===
- "How Do You Do!", a song by Roxette
- "How Do You Do?" (beFour song), 2007
- "How Do You Do" (Mouth & MacNeal song), 1971
- "How Do You Do" (Shakira song), 2005
- "How Do You Do?", a song by the Boomtown Rats released as the B-side to "Like Clockwork", 1987
- "How Do You Do?", a song by Natasha Bedingfield from her 2007 album N.B.
- "How Do You Do?", a song from the Disney film Song of the South, 1946
- "How Do You Do?", theme song of The Happiness Boys (1924)

== See also ==
- How Do You Do It?, a song featuring the lyrics "How do you do what you do to me?", best-known for the version by Gerry and the Pacemakers
- How Are You (disambiguation)
- How Have You Been (disambiguation)
- How You Been (disambiguation)
