= How You Been =

How You Been may refer to:

- "How You Been?", a song from Vendetta (Mic Geronimo album), 1997
- "How You Been?", a song from Thundamentals' 2011 album, Foreverlution
- "How You Been?", a song from Dreamteam's 2015 album, Dreams Never Die
- "How You Been", a song from Holy Holy's 2021 album Hello My Beautiful World

== See also ==
- How Have You Been (disambiguation)
- How Are You (disambiguation)
- How Do You Do (disambiguation)
