= Nico Touches the Walls =

Japanese band

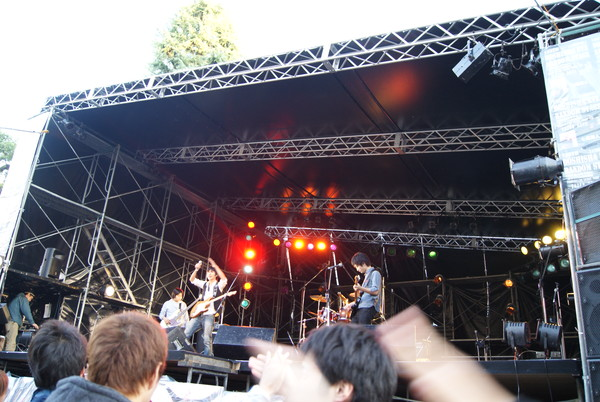
- Nico Touches the Walls performing in 2010

Background information
- Origin: Japan
- Genres: Alternative rock; power pop
- Years active: 2004–2019
- Labels: Management: Senha and Company (2006–2010); A-Sketch (2010–2019); Recording: Ki/oon Records
- Past members: Tatsuya Mitsumura; Daisuke Furumura; Shingo Sakakura; Shotaro Tsushima
- Website: nicotouchesthewalls.com

Nico Touches the Walls (stylized as NICO Touches the Walls) was a Japanese rock band formed in 2004. The band members were: Mitsumura Tatsuya, Sakakura Shingo, Furumura Daisuke & Tsushima Shotaro. In the same year, they won the Lotte Prize at the Yamaha Teen Music Festival. Rising quickly, they signed to "Senha & Co." before signing to Sony Music Japan's Ki/oon Records in 2007. Their debut single, in a major label, "Yoru no Hate", was released in February 2008.

Along the career, the band has contributed to anime with their songs, such as “Mashi Mashi” being the ending theme for the 3rd season of Haikyuu!!. "Broken Youth", "Diver", and "Niwaka Ame ni Mo Makezu", featured in Naruto: Shippuden; their hit single "Hologram" chosen as opening theme for Fullmetal Alchemist: Brotherhood, as many others.

In November 2019, the band announced that they were disbanding after 15 years.

== History ==
=== Early years (2004–2007) ===
Formed in 2004, Nico Touches the Walls won the Lotte Prize at the 2004 Yamaha Teens' Music Festival. The quartet's success really picked up since they made their indie debut with Senha and Company in 2006. They released two indie mini albums that year: "Walls Is Beginning" and "Runova X Handover". In 2007, Nico Touches the Walls signed a deal with Ki/oon Records. They released their debut mini albums "Eden", in June, and "How Are You?" in November the same year.

=== Who Are You? (2008) ===
The band raised quickly from the indie scene to a top label. In 2008, they featured in a television commercial for Glico's Pocky. Their debut single "Yoru no Hate" was released in February 2008, being an introduction single for the rock quartet, which reached number 64 on the Oricon Chart. They kept raising, and later their second single "The Bungy" was released on June 4, being a very different song from their previous style. The band also had the song "Broken Youth" featured as ending theme for the anime series Naruto: Shippuden, that year. "Broken Youth" became one of the band's most popular songs, reaching 24 on the chart in Japan. In the same year, their debut studio album Who Are You? was released on September 24 containing all their previous singles. "Who are you?" almost entered in the top 10, reaching number 11 in its first week. Later, Nico Touches the walls embarked on tour to promote the album, Titled "Tour 2008 Bon voyage, Etranger", the tour started in Shibuya, in a special concert named "We are Nico Touches the Walls. ～A Queen of the Night～", on October 15, and finished in Tokyo, on December 14.

=== Aurora (2009–2010) ===
A new single titled "Big Foot" was released on May 13, nine months after the first album "Who Are You?". After getting people's attention thanks to their song for the anime Naruto: Shippuden, the band made the most of their record company's business network and provided the opening song for Fullmetal Alchemist: Brotherhood, in August, with the song "Hologram". The single became the band's highest ranking single on the Oricon music chart, and a steady stream of fans downloaded the song's ringtone version.

During their performances in various summer music festivals, they proved why they have become known as one of the hottest bands in town. In October, they finished the recording of a new song. The track was released on November 4, titled "Kakera subete no Omoitachi he-", a mid-tempo song that was featured as the main theme for the Japanese TV drama series Bocho Mania 09, on October 22, starring the popular actor Mukai Osamu. Right after the single, on November 24, the second studio album Aurora was released.

To promote the new album, they kicked off the Tour 2009-2010 & Auroras, on December 27, holding their first ever Nippon Budokan performance on March 27, 2010.

=== Passenger (2010–2011) ===
After their first experience playing at the Budoukan, Nico Touches the Walls took on a new challenge. On May 16, 2010, the band embarked on a live house tour named "Tour 2010 Michi Naki Michi", visiting all the locations they'd never been before and playing different songs at each show. In each one of these days they produced many new songs and anecdotes. The final day of the tour, June 12, at Yokohama Blitz, was recorded, where a new single was revealed. It was "Sudden Death Game" and was released on August 11, 2010. The song was chosen for the audience good reaction during the shows, being the only release that year.

In November, it was announced a split tour with the band Flumpool for January 2011.

"I've got a feeling that it's going to be an extremely thrilling Split Tour. Or shall I say, it definitely will be. Since the first time we performed together with flumpool at an event in Osaka, on one hand we became aware of the many similarities in the makeup of our bands, on the other hand flumpool's so refined when they perform that as a boorish bunch of guys we're sort of jealous...But given that we're born in the same generation, to be able to feel the music at such a close distance while on tour with others just like us, it makes me nervous, in a good way. If they’re going to toss a hard, straight ball our way…of course, we're going to step right up"

— Mitsumura Tatsuya (vocalist) about the tour

The single "Diver" was released on January 12, along with the DVD from the Michi Naki Michi tour, titled "You Say No Way, We Say Go Way". The song was used as the eighth opening for the TV Tokyo anime Naruto: Shippuden, since October 2010, as their second contribution for the anime. The single was the most successful, reaching number 7 on the Oricon chart in Japan, becoming the band's first top 10 single. The split tour with the band Flumpool also started in January. It took place at Zepp Tokyo, Nagoya and Osaka, which was the first time they embarked on a joint tour.

On April 4, 2011, their third studio album Passenger was released, over one year since their previous record Aurora. Also in April, the song "Matryoshka", from the album, was featured as opening theme for the anime C - the Money of Soul and Possibility Control, aired by Fuji TV.

To promote the album, a national tour called "Nico Touches the Walls Tour 2011 Passenger: We Are Passionate Messenger" was launched. The tour started at the Kashiwa Palooza, on April 13, and had its final concert at Zepp Tokyo, on June 10.

=== Humania (2011–2012) ===
On the concert of June 10, at Zepp Tokyo, Nico Touches the Walls announced a new summer single called "Te o Tatake". The song was released on August 17 and was featured on the LISMO TV commercial. On August 21, they delivered a live program on Ustream, called Minnade tsukurou Te o Tatake Network and Acoustic Live, towards fans who purchased the latest single, which the theme song "Te o Tatake" was shown in collaboration with the hand clapping videos sent by fans through the special website.

In September, the band has the song "Endless Roll", written by the bassist Shingo Sakakura, featured on the film Switch o Osu Toki, released on September 17. As of October, they provided the song "Bicycle" to be theme song for the drama 11 Nin mo Iru!. The drama was screen written by Kudo Kankuro and began airing in the same month.

After only eight months from their previous record, they announced an album, Humania, to be released in December the same year, as a nationwide tour for 2012 titled "Tour2012 Humania". On December 3, Nico Touches the Walls was one of the guests in the Fuji TV's music program "Music Fair". In the episode, the band performed the song "Dramatic Rain" with the singer "Inagaki Junichi", and then the show also aired their performance for the song "Bicycle".

On December 7, the fourth album "Humania" was released and debuted at number 10 on the Oricon Chart, being the band's first top ten album on career. On January 13, 2012, they started the first leg of "Tour 2012 Humania", in Yokohama Blitz. On March 10, the band kicked off the second leg, "Ground of Humania", in Nagoya. The tour ended on March 20, in Chiba.

=== Algorhytmique and Shout to the Walls! (2012–2013) ===
During the Chiba concert, on March 20, the band revealed the new song "Natsu no Daisankakkei" for the first time. They also have the song featured on the Calpis Water commercial, first broadcast on the same day. On May 16, 2012, the single "Natsu no Daisankakkei" and the second music video collection "Library 2" were released. To celebrate the new single, that day, the band held an outdoor concert at Yoyoga Park, Tokyo, where they also recorded live a music video for the song "Rappa to Musume". The concert was streamed live on Ustream. The band was set to publish their first interview book titled: Nico Touches the Walls Trip Tragetory - Interview and Photo Chronicle 2007-2012, on May 25, 2012, but it was changed to July 25. It contains all their interviews from the indie "Eden" (2007) to "Humania" (2011).

From September 27, Nico Touches the Walls started the Tour 2012 "Algorhytmique", being the largest tour on their career to date, in total of 23 concerts, from September to December. During the tour, the band revealed their 11th single "Yume 1 Go" to be released in December; a concert on October 28 was also postponed to November 20, due to one member being in poor health.

On November 16, they made a web broadcast in four different channels, to premier their new song, new music video and live performances of the tour, at the Zepp Tokyo. On December 19, the single "Yume 1 Go" was released. On December 20, the Tour 2012 "Algorhytmique" had its final concert presented in Osaka. A new song, "Runner", written by Mitsumura during his high school years, was featured in the TBS program Ekiden and had limited release through digital download, from December 26 until January 8.

Nico Touches the Walls' first single in 2013 was announced during the regular web program Jamboriii Station, on January 25. "Mr. Echo" was released on March 27, along with the coupling track "Chain Reaction", previously played during the last tour, used as the New Balance collaboration song. Following the single, in early April, a new song "Niwaka Ame ni Mo Makezu" is featured as the Naruto: Shippuden opening theme, becoming their third contribution to the anime.

On April 24, the fifth album Shout to the Walls! was released. To celebrate it, the band held a special concert at Zepp Tokyo, which was broadcast live on internet via their official channel on YouTube. Shout to the Walls! became their first top 5 album on career, with over 10,000 sales in the first week. On May 16, to promote the new album, the band launched their first national tour in halls, sponsored by New Balance, titled: "New Balance presents Nico Touches the Walls Tour 2013 Shout to the Walls!", playing the last dates, at the NHK Hall, in Tokyo.

=== Nico Touches the Walls no Best (2013–2014) ===
Near the end of the Shout to the Walls! tour, on July 10, the band released a new single "Niwaka Ame ni Mo Makezu". The song was previously featured as opening theme for Naruto: Shippuden.

From January 14, 2014, they toured for 3 dates under the title Nico Touches the Walls no Fest., along with the bands BigMama, [Alexandros] and Creephyp. A song titled "Pandora" was featured in the Japanese movie Genome Hazard, released on January 24. As of February 1, they kicked off their project Himitsukichi "Kabe Ni Mimi", performing live 20 concerts in Tokyo, during the whole month, and releasing their first best-of album, tilted NICO Touches the Walls no Best, on February 5. A month later, on March 5, the 14th single "Rawhide" was released, while its coupling track was the song "Tayou ga Warattera", featured in the movie 7 Days Report.

The band held 5 concerts for their zepp tour NICO Touches the Walls no Zepp, starting in Osaka, on May 31 to June 15, in Tokyo. After being aired as the ending theme for the TV series Haikyuu, Nico Touches the Walls released their song "Tenchi Gaeshi" as the 15th single, on June 11. A new song titled "Bakemono" had its music video unveiled on June 19, on the band's official YouTube channel. The song was featured as theme song for the drama Hensachi 70, which was first aired on July 2. The song had a digital release on July 1.

On August 19, Nico Touches the Walls played for the second time at the Nippon Budokan, in a special concert titled Nico Touches the Walls no Budokan, gathering more than 9000 people, in a sold-out venue. According to the members, the concert was supposed to be a revenge to the previous one, held in 2010. A day later, on August 20, the new single "Tokyo Dreamer" was released, while the title track was featured in the anime Captain Earth, aired by MBS.

=== Howdy!! We are ACO Touches the Walls (2015) ===
During the encore of their annual concert "1125", on November 25, at Club Citta, in Kanagawa, the band announced the release of their first acoustic album, titled Howdy!! We are ACO Touches the Walls. On February 4, Howdy!! We are ACO Touches the Walls was released, reaching number 7 on the oricon charts, in its first week. On February 12 and 14 Nico Touches the Walls held their Billboard Live: Howdy We are ACO Touches the Walls, in Tokyo and Osaka.

=== "Uzu to Uzu" and Yuuki mo Ai mo Nai Nante (2015–2016) ===
The band embarked on their first national tour in two years. Starting May 21, the Tour 2015 "Massuguna Tour" had 21 concerts in total. Their 17th single "Massuguna Uta" was released on June 24. The tour final presentation was held for the first time at the Tokyo International Forum A, on July 19.

Nico Touches the Walls provided their new song "Uzu to Uzu" as the second opening theme for the animation The Heroic Legend of Arslan, aired by TBS. The band announced their first ever Osaka-Jo Hall arena concert titled Live Special 2015 Uzu to Uzu ~Nishi no Uzu~, scheduled for December 23, and their third Nippon Budokan concert, titled Uzu to Uzu ~Higashi no Uzu~, for January 9. On September 2, their new single "Uzu to Uzu" was released.

On November 13, the band announced through their official website and Twitter account that the guitarist Daisuke Furumura had injured his right hand and, therefore, could not join the band to continue their scheduled concerts. As a result, the band's activities for the rest of the year were immediately canceled and postponed. Their concert at Osaka-Jo Hall was postponed to May 2016, as "Live Special 2016 Uzu to Uzu ~Nishi no Uzu~".

On January 8, 2016, the band played for the third time at Nippon Budokan, with the concert Special Live 2016 Uzu to Uzu ~Higashi no Uzu~. At the concert, three songs were played for the first time. In the same day, they announced their first studio album in three years, Yuuki mo Ai mo Nai Nante. The album was released on March 16.

The band provided the song "Strato" to be the theme song of the Japanese movie Hero Mania ~Seikatsu~. The single is released on May 3, along with their third music video collection DVD, Library Vol. 3.

Their single "Mashi Mashi" was released on November 30, 2016, and was used as the ending theme of third season of anime Haikyuu.

=== Oyster and Twister (2017–2018) ===
On November 25, 2017, a live event "1125/2017" was held at Makuhari Messe International Exhibition Center in Chiba Prefecture. It was held in the form of a festival with guest artists such as the Tokyo Ska Paradise Orchestra.

On December 6, The new CD "Oyster-EP-" was released. This is a set of two CDs, consisting of a main CD containing five new songs and a bonus disc containing an acoustic version of each song.

The national tour "Nico Touches the Walls "N X A" Tour" was held from June, 2018. On July 25, The new CD "Twister-EP-" was released. Like "Oyster-EP-" released last December, "Twister-EP-" consists of 2 discs, Disc 1 which contains 5 new songs and bonus disc which contains acoustic version of Disc 1 songs.

== Members ==
- Tatsuya Mitsumura (光村龍哉, born September 8, 1985) – vocals, guitar
- Daisuke Furumura (古村大介, born March 1, 1985) – guitar
- Shingo Sakakura (坂倉心悟, born July 24, 1985) – bass guitar
- Shotaro Tsushima (対馬祥太郎, born January 28, 1985) – drums

=== Supporting members ===
- Kousuke Noma (埜間浩介, born 1974) – keyboards

== Discography ==
- Who are you? (2008)
- Aurora (2009)
- Passenger (2011)
- Humania (2011)
- Shout to the Walls! (2013)
- Yuuki mo Ai mo Nai Nante (2016)
- Quizmaster (2019)

== Live performances ==
=== Tours ===
- Tour 2007–08 A Queen Of The Night
- Tour 2008 Bon voyage, Etranger
- Tour 2009–10 "& Auroras"
- Tour 2010 Michi Naki Michi
- Tour 2011 Passenger ~We are Passionate Messenger~
- Tour 2012 Humania / Ground of Humania
- Tour 2012 "Algorhytmique"
- New Balance presents Nico Touches the Walls Tour 2013 Shout to the Walls!
- Tour 2015 Massuguna Tour
- Tour 2016 "Yuuki mo Ai mo Nai Nante"

=== Single-day performances ===
- "Walls Is Auroras" at Nippon Budokan
- Day of Apollo / Night of Luna
- Nico Touches the Walls no Budokan
- Live Special 2016 Uzu to Uzu ~Higashi no Uzu~
- Live Special 2016 Uzu to Uzu ~Nishi no Uzu~

== Awards ==
Year	Nominated work	Award	Result
2004	Themselves	Yamaha Teen Music Festival: Lotte Prize	Won
2013	"Yume 1 gou"	Space Shower Music Video Awards: Best music video	Nominated
2014	"Niwaka Ame ni Mo Makezu"	Space Shower Music Video Awards: Best music video	Nominated
2015	"Tokyo Dreamer"	Space Shower Music Video Awards: Best music video	Nominated
