= How Have You Been =

How Have You Been may refer to:

- "How Have You Been", a song from John B. Sebastian (album), 1970
- "How Have You Been", a song from Ani DiFranco's Out of Range (album), 1994
- "How Have You Been", a song from Angela Chang's 2012 album, Visible Wings
- "How Have You Been?", a 2016 song by Eric Chou
- "How Have You Been", a song used as a theme for a Taiwanese television series, All in 700

== See also ==
- How You Been (disambiguation)
- How Are You (disambiguation)
- How Do You Do (disambiguation)
