= Kakera: Subete no Omoitachi e =

"Subete no Omoitachi e"

Single by Nico Touches the Walls

from the album Aurora
- Released: 4 November 2009
- Genre: Alternative rock, power pop
- Length: 4:36

Nico Touches the Walls singles chronology
"Hologram" (2009)	"Subete no Omoitachi e" (2009)	"Sudden Death Game" (2010)

"Subete no Omoitachi e" (かけら -総べての想いたちへ-) is a single by the Japanese band Nico Touches the Walls from their second studio album, Aurora.

The single was released on November 4, 2009, and was used as the theme song for the TV Tokyo drama Bocho Mania 09, the band's first musical participation in a TV drama.

== Music video ==
The music video for the song, released the same day, features Bocho Mania 09 actor Osamu Mukai. The video shows a young and distraught businessman who keeps seeing a goat's head, desperate, while he sings the song with the band.

== Track list ==
1. Kakera: Subete no Omoitachi e
2. Aurora (Prelude)
3. Hologram (Live)

== Chart position ==
The single reached number 24 on the Oricon Chart in Japan.
