= Yoru no Hate =

Single by Nico Touches the Walls

from the album Who Are You?
- B-side: "April"
- Released: February 20, 2008
- Genre: Alternative rock, power pop, experimental rock
- Length: 4:50
- Label: Ki/oon Records

Nico Touches the Walls singles chronology
| "(My Sweet) Eden" (2007) | "Yoru no Hate" (2008) | "The Bungy" (2008) |

"Yoru no Hate" ( 夜の果て, End of the Night), is the first major single by the Japanese band Nico Touches the Walls from their debut album Who Are You?. The single is a very great introduction for the rock quartet. It's a loud and emotional song mixed exceptionally well with prevailing guitar and all.

"Yoru no Hate" comes with two more tracks: "Bunny Girl to Danny Boy" (another song from the album "Who Are You?") and "April" a slow love song that works as a great cooldown after listening to the title track.

== Chart position ==
"Yoru no Hate" peaked at number 64 on the Oricon Chart in Japan.

== Track listing ==
1. "Yoru no Hate"
2. "Bunny Girl to Danny boy"
3. "April"
