= Shout to the Walls! =

Studio album by Nico Touches the Walls
- Released: April 24, 2013
- Recorded: 2012–2013
- Genre: Alternative rock, power pop
- Length: 50:53
- Label: Ki/oon Records
- Producer: Nico Touches the Walls; Seiji Kameda

Nico Touches the Walls chronology
Humania (2011)	Shout to the Walls! (2013)	NICO Touches the Walls no Best (2014)

Singles from Shout to the Walls!
- 1. "Natsu no Daisankakkei" Released: May 16, 2012; 2. "Yume 1 Go" Released: December 19, 2012; 3. "Runner" Released: December 27, 2012; 4. "Mr. Echo" Released: March 27, 2013

Shout to the Walls! is the fifth studio album by the Japanese rock band NICO Touches the Walls, released on April 24, 2013. It includes the hit songs "Natsu no Daisankakkei", "Yume 1 Gou" and "Mr.Echo". The album is available in regular (CD-only version) and limited edition (CD+DVD). The Limited edition includes a DVD titled "NICO Touches the Walls Acoustic Sessions Vol 2.". On April 24, a special concert was held, at Liquidroom Ebisu, Tokyo, to celebrate the album release, being broadcast on web.

== Singles / Tie-ins ==
"Natsu no Daisankakkei" was released on May 16, 2012. Presented for the first time during the "Ground of HUMANIA" tour, the song was featured in the 2012 commercial of Calpis Water.

"Yume 1 Gou" was released as the second single from the album, on December 19, 2012. The song was used as the December theme song for the TV program CDTV.

"Runner" was released on December 27, on iTunes, as a digital single only and limited release. The song was featured in the TBS program "Ekiden".

"Mr. Echo" was the final single from the album, released on March 27, 2013. It was also released through digital version, on March 20, along with the song b-side "Chain Reaction", used as the New Balance collaboration song.

== Track listing ==
No.	Title	Length
1.	"Kodou"	4:21
2.	"Yume 1 Gou"	4:44
3.	"Natsu no Daisankakkei"	4:52
4.	"Abidhalma"	4:36
5.	"Strawberry Girl"	4:04
6.	"Akai Tsume"	5:16
7.	"Chain Reaction"	3:57
8.	"Runner"	3:50
9.	"Arpeggio"	4:33
10.	"(who)"	1:09
11.	"Mr. Echo"	4:49
12.	"damaged goods 〜Shien Chinkonka〜"	4:33
Total length:		50:53

=== Limited edition ===
No.	Title	Length
1.	"鼓動"
2.	"夢１号"
3.	"夏の大三角形"
4.	"アビダルマ"
5.	"ストロベリーガール"
6.	"紅い爪"
7.	"チェインリアクション"
8.	"ランナー"
9.	"アルペジオ"
10.	"(who)"
11.	" Mr.ECHO"
12.	"damaged goods 〜紫煙鎮魂歌〜"
Total length:		50:53

DVD
No.	Title	Length
1.	""Nico Touches the Walls Acoustic Sessions Vol.2""

== Chart position ==
The album hit number 5 on the Oricon chart, making it the second top 10 album on career, with 10,486 sales in its first week.

== Promotion ==
To promote the album, the band embarked on tour, sponsored by New Balance, under the title " new balance presents NICO Touches the Walls Tour 2013 Shout to the Walls!", scheduled from May 16 to July, 2013.
