= Lagrange: The Flower of Rin-ne =

Japanese anime television series and its adaptations

- Cover of first Blu-ray Disc volume featuring, from left to right: Muginami, Madoka Kyono and Lan

輪廻のラグランジェ (Rinne no Raguranje)
- Genre: Adventure, Mecha, Science fantasy
- Created by: Production I.G
- Manga

Rinne no Lagrange: Akatoki no Memoria
- Written by: Shotaro Suga
- Illustrated by: Kimitake Yoshioka
- Published by: Square Enix
- Magazine: Young Gangan
- Original run: September 2, 2011 – February 25, 2013
- Anime television series
- Directed by: Tatsuo Satō (Note: Credited as 総監督 (Chief Director).); Toshimasa Suzuki
- Produced by: Hiroyuki Kikugawa; Nao Hirasawa; Shūichi Kitada; Hirotsugu Ogisu; Ken Kawakita; Masao Itō (#13–24)
- Written by: Shōtarō Suga; Shigeru Morita (Note: Credited as 構成協力 (Series Composition Assistant).); Yūichi Nomura
- Music by: Saeko Suzuki; TOMISIRO
- Studio: Xebec
- Licensed by: AUS: Madman Entertainment; NA: Viz Media (expired), Discotek Media (current); UK: Anime on Demand
- Original network: Tokyo MX, Yomiuri TV
- English network: NA: Neon Alley (former), RetroCrush (current)
- Original run: January 8, 2012 – September 23, 2012
- Episodes: 24
- Original video animation

Lagrange: The Flower of Rin-ne - Kamogawa Days
- Directed by: Tatsuo Satō; Toshimasa Suzuki
- Produced by: Hiroyuki Kikugawa; Nao Hirasawa; Shūichi Kitada; Hirotsugu Ogisu; Ken Kawakita; Masao Itō
- Written by: Shōtarō Suga; Shigeru Morita; Yūichi Nomura
- Music by: Saeko Suzuki; TOMISIRO
- Studio: Xebec
- Released: August 23, 2012
- Runtime: 43 minutes
- Video game

Rinne no Lagrange: Kamogawa Dream Match
- Developer: Namco Bandai Games
- Publisher: Namco Bandai Games
- Platform: PlayStation 3
- Released: JP: August 23, 2012

Lagrange: The Flower of Rin-ne (Japanese: 輪廻のラグランジェ, Hepburn: Rinne no Raguranje) is a Japanese anime television series produced by Xebec and Production I.G and directed by Tatsuo Sato and Toshimasa Suzuki, written by Shotaro Suga, original character design by Haruyuki Morisawa and music by Saeko Suzuki & TOMISIRO. Set in Kamogawa, the series revolves around Madoka Kyouno, Fin E Ld Si Laffinty (Lan) and Muginami, who all come from different worlds and attend the Kamogawa Girls' High School. While they form the Jersey Club to fulfill tasks for other school clubs, they are also destined to pilot strange robotic aircraft known as Vox Units, supported by a military organization named Novumundus stationed at an offshore base called Pharos. Their ultimate mission is to cease the intergalactic war between neighboring planets called Le Garite and De Metrio, in an attempt to restore the friendship between the planets' respective leaders named Dizelmine and Villagulio.

The first season aired in Japan between January 8, 2012, and March 24, 2012, while the second season started airing between July 8, 2012, and September 23, 2012, following a recap episode on July 1, 2012. Both seasons have been licensed by Viz Media in North America and Anime on Demand in the United Kingdom. A manga accompaniment began serialization in Enix's Young Gangan magazine and a light novel from Media Factory, both from September 2011. A hybrid Blu-ray Disc containing an original video animation and a PlayStation 3 video game was released on August 23, 2012.

== Plot ==
Madoka Kyouno is an extremely energetic girl who is always full of passion and enthusiasm. As the proud and only member of the Kamogawa Girls' High School's Jersey Club, she is always ready to assist anyone who is in need of help.

However, her life takes an unexpected and surprising turn when a mysterious alien from the planet Le Garite named Lan arrives on Earth and asks her to operate a strange robotic aircraft-like vehicle (called a Vox Unit) which she encountered while drowning ten years ago. Motivated by her desire to protect the city of Kamogawa and its people, Madoka agrees to pilot the awakened Vox Unit to fight against dangerous aliens that have come to wreak havoc on Earth.

== Characters ==
=== Main characters ===
Madoka Kyouno (京乃 まどか, Kyōno Madoka)
Voiced by: Kaori Ishihara (Japanese); Kira Buckland (English)
The sole member of a Jersey Club who often helps out other clubs and people in need and is passionate about her home town of Kamogawa. She has a habit of saying "Perfect" (まるっ, Maru; lit. 'circle', used for marking correct answers) and draws a circle in the air when she finishes helping someone. She soon discovers she has the ability to pilot a strange robotic aircraft known as the Vox Aura, which she previously encountered ten years ago when she almost drowned. She names this Vox unit Midori, after its green color. In Season 2, she is in her last year of high school and has not thought what she is going to do for the future. She still helps out with the Jersey Club and her uncle's new beach cafe.
Lan (ラン, Ran) / Fin E Ld Si Laffinty (フィン・エ・ルド・スイ・ラフィンティ, Fin E Rudo Sui Rafinti)
Voiced by: Asami Seto (Japanese); Michelle Ruff (English)
An alien girl from the home planet Le Garite, who was sent to protect Madoka and the aircraft. She is not used to Earth culture and often picks up terms from the strangest sources, often barking like a dog (i.e. saying "Woof" (わんっ, Wan)) after Asteria tricked her into thinking it was a standard Earth greeting. Not only that, her unfamiliarity with Earth's culture makes her somewhat clumsy as well. She was initially unable to properly utilize her Vox Unit as the knowledge of a supposed fate concerning Vox pilots caused her to become afraid. However, Madoka helps her overcome her fear and she becomes able to use her Vox unit, Vox Rympha, which she names Orca. She is particularly jealous towards Muginami, who shows a lot of interest in Madoka, which leads to her joining the Jersey Club and begin living with Madoka. Due to her luxurious upbringing as princess of the planet Le Garite, Lan has little understanding of the commoners' lifestyle. She returns in Season 2. Though she looks that same, Madoka pointed out she grew up a little bit.
Muginami (ムギナミ, Muginami)
Voiced by: Ai Kayano (Japanese); Karen Strassman (English)
Another Ovid pilot who transfers in Madoka's class and joins the Jersey Club. Although she appears to have a slow-witted personality, she is actually sharp and perceptive. She will occasionally say "Roger that!" (かしこまり〜, Kashikomari~). Born on a Prison Planet, she views Villagulio as an older brother and by his orders, she infiltrated the Pharos base to steal one of the Ovids, thus she ends up becoming the pilot of Vox Ignis, which she nicknamed Hupo. Other than becoming a pilot, she also shows her professional skills of a lifeguard, a martial artist, and a waitress on occasions. After being betrayed and abandoned by Villagulio, Muginami finds herself a new place among Madoka and her friends. After Villagulio's second skirmish, she and her Vox Unit took him and retreated into space. She returns in Season 2 where, after realizing she doesn't want to fight those she loves, rejoins the Jersey Club. Hupo is now equipped with an energy cape she uses as a shield.

=== Kamogawa residents ===
Youko Nakaizumi (中泉 ようこ, Nakaizumi Yōko)
Voiced by: Mamiko Noto (Japanese); Wendee Lee (English)
Madoka's cousin who is a researcher on underwater archaeology and tried to prevent Madoka from coming into contact with the Vox Unit. She gives in to Madoka's decision to pilot Vox Aura but only on the condition that Madoka is to continue with her daily life as usual. She is a former member of the Jersey Club who inspired Madoka to be like her. In Season 2, she continues her research on the Vox Units and the Rin-ne.
Hiroshi Nakaizumi (中泉 浩, Nakaizumi Hiroshi)
Voiced by: Kenji Hamada (Japanese); Kirk Thornton (English)
Madoka's uncle and Youko's father who owns the 'Be With Hiroshi' restaurant, where Madoka lives. In Season 2, he opened a beach cafe which did much better than his restaurant ever did since Le Garite reveal themselves to the public.
Machiko Iwabuchi (岩淵 まちこ, Iwabuchi Machiko)
Voiced by: Azumi Asakura (Japanese); Dorothy Elias-Fahn (English)
A teacher at Madoka's school, who was a member of the Jersey Club along Youko and Madoka's mother.
Souta Serizawa (芹沢 颯太, Serizawa Sōta)
Voiced by: Yūichi Iguchi (Japanese); J.C. Miller (English)
Youko's assistant. In Season 2, he and Youko are continuing her research on the Vox Units and the Rin-ne.

=== Novumundus ===
Shozo Tadokoro (田所 正蔵, Tadokoro Shōzō)
Voiced by: Makoto Yasumura (Japanese); Patrick Seitz (English)
The commander of the Pharos facility.
Eri Watabe (渡部 えり, Watabe Eri)
Voiced by: Rie Tanaka (Japanese); Laura Post (English)
Asteria Lizamarie de Roschefall (アステリア・リーザマリー・ド・ロシュフォール, Asuteria Rīzamarī do Roshufōru)
Voiced by: Hisako Kanemoto (Japanese); Stephanie Sheh (English)
The granddaughter of the chairman of Novumundus, who provides most of the orders in the organization. She dresses in Lolita fashion and wields a great deal of authority. She also has a memoria on her chest. In Season 2, she reveals herself as the reincarnation of Queen Maycun who almost destroyed Earth 20,000 years ago by "opening" the Rin-ne and feeling responsible.

=== De Metrio ===
Villagulio (ヴィラジュリオ, Virajurio)
Voiced by: Yuichi Nakamura (Japanese); Keith Silverstein (English)
The disowned prince of De Metrio who was thrown into Muginami's home planet and became close to her. Soon after, he formed the rebellious organization "Kiss" and sent Muginami to Kamogawa to investigate about the Vox Units, but apparently gets angry at her for becoming the pilot of Vox Ignis and abandons her, while actually it was part of his plan to have her get close to Madoka and the others. In Season 2, it is revealed that Villagulio reclaimed the throne of De Metrio and is currently at war with Le Garite.
Kirius (キリウス, Kiriusu)
Voiced by: Kenji Nojima (Japanese); Johnny Yong Bosch (English)
Former antagonist that piloted the Ovid Libertas. He is the oldest of the three and the most experienced. In Season 2, he is now working at Hiroshi's new beach cafe as a waiter (in butler cosplay) after Villagulio's second skirmish. He seems to attract a lot of customers, specifically female customers. He is also the reason why the beach cafe is doing much better than Hiroshi's restaurant.
Izo (イゾ)
Voiced by: Hiroyuki Yoshino (Japanese); Ben Diskin (English)
Former antagonist that piloted the Ovid Voluntas. He tends to be rebellious, but is understanding. In Season 2, he is now working at Hiroshi's new beach cafe as a cook (which he is pretty good) after Villagulio's second skirmish. He really enjoys life on Earth.
Array (アレイ, Arei)
Voiced by: Yoshitsugu Matsuoka (Japanese); Sam Riegel (English)
Former antagonist that pilots the Ovid Teneritas. He is the youngest of the three and the least experienced. He has a fetish for maid outfits and looks very good in it (even though he looks like a pretty girl). In Season 2, he is now working at Hiroshi's new beach cafe as a waiter (in maid cosplay) after Villagulio's second skirmish.
Yurikano (ユリカノ)
Voiced by: Mariya Ise (Japanese); Carrie Keranen (English)
The princess of De Metrio and Villagulio's sister. She was presumed dead after a failed Vox Particle Control Experiment with disastrous consequences. It is later revealed that she survived the experiment and rescued by Le Garite following the Tradegy of Militia Zodia, since then secretly under Dizelmine's care.
Grania (グラニア, Gurania)
Voiced by: Megumi Nakajima (Japanese); Cristina Vee (English)
Villagulio's right-hand woman.

=== Le Garite ===
Dizelmine (ディセルマイン, Diserumain)
Voiced by: Daisuke Ono (Japanese); Liam O'Brien (English)
The crown prince of Le Garite and Lan's older brother. His true objective is making use of Madoka and the Vox Units to destroy the planet De Metrio, as part of his plan to ensure Le Garite's survival as both planets' respective planetary systems are en route of collision. He ended up becoming a young kid after leaving the Rin-ne due to his wishes to right his wrongs.
Moid (モイド, Moido)
Voiced by: Kazuyuki Okitsu (Japanese); Vic Mignogna (English)
Dizelmine's aide who was an observator at Pharos during the first season, and since then returned to assist his master. It is revealed he manipulated Dizelmine into opening the Rin-ne, and is also responsible for Queen Maycun who nearly destroyed the Earth 20,000 years ago.

=== Mecha ===
Vox Aura
17.3 meters tall and piloted by Madoka; is later renamed Midori. Originally devoid of weapons, it is specialized in close quarters combat and later in the series it is equipped with a sword called the Formula 32 and a left wrist energy shield. Also comes with a Velociraptor Attachment.
Vox Rympha
17.3 meters tall and piloted by Lan; is later renamed Orca. Armaments include a right wrist sword-machine gun hybrid armed with 120mm bullets and a left wrist energy shield.
Vox Ignis
17.4 meters tall and piloted by Muginami; is later renamed Hupo. Armaments include a pair of energy guns that can combine into a double sided sword, a beam cannon, and in the second half of the series an energy cape.
Ovid Libertas
17.4 meters tall and piloted by Kirius. Armaments include a metal staff, a pair of heat swords that can convert into whips, and a force field.
Ovid Voluntas
17.9 meters tall and piloted by Izo. Armaments include a pair of heat clubs and a force field.
Ovid Teneritas
17.4 meters tall and piloted by Array. Armaments include an energy cannon on each shoulder and a force field.
Avarium
19 meters tall and piloted by Villagulio. Armaments include an anchor in each arm, a pair of large swords, and a large mortar gun called the Death Wish. It is upgraded to Avarium Sepera in the second half of the series.
Magultol
Piloted by Dizelmine. Is armed with a sword in the right wrist. Later revealed to be a fourth Vox Unit.

== Media ==
=== Anime ===
The first season of the anime by Production I.G and Xebec aired in Japan from January 8, 2012, to March 24, 2012. The first episode was pre-aired on January 1, 2012. A second season aired in Japan between July 8, 2012, and September 23, 2012, following a recap episode on July 1, 2012. The anime was licensed in North America by Viz Media and in the United Kingdom by Anime on Demand. An English dubbed version streamed on Viz Media's Neon Alley service for PlayStation 3 from January 2013. The series is now streaming on RetroCrush after Viz's license expired. For the first season, the respective opening and ending themes are "Try Unite!" and "Hello!", both performed by Megumi Nakajima. For the second season, the opening theme is "Marble" (マーブル, Māburu) by Nakajima whilst the ending themes are "Jersey Club Spirit!" (ジャージ部魂!, Jāji-bu Tamashī!) by Kaori Ishihara, Asami Seto and Ai Kayano and "Don't Forget Me." (忘れないよ。, Wasurenai yo.) by Nakajima. An original video animation titled Rinne no Lagrange: Kamogawa Days (輪廻のラグランジェ: 鴨川デイズ, Rinne no Reguranje: Kamogawa Deizu), was released on a Hybrid Blu-ray Disc alongside a game for PlayStation 3 on August 23, 2012, following an advance screening in ten theaters on June 23, 2012.

=== Manga ===
A manga accompaniment written by Shotaro Suga and illustrated by Kimitake Yoshioka, titled Lagrange: The Flower of Rin-ne ~Dawn of Memoria~ (輪廻のラグランジェ 〜暁月のメモリア〜, Rinne no Raguranje ~Akatsuki no Memoria~), began serialisation in Young Gangan magazine from September 2, 2011.

=== Video game ===
A PlayStation 3 video game developed by Bandai Namco Entertainment, titled Lagrange: The Flower of Rin-ne -Kamogawa Dream Match- (輪廻のラグランジェ -鴨川ドリームマッチ-, Rinne no Ragurenje -Kamogawa Dorīmu Macchi-), was released on the Kamogawa Days Hybrid Disc on August 23, 2012.

== See also ==
- List of Square Enix manga franchises
