= Humania (communication project) =

HUMANIA is a communication project with development purposes. It started as a TV program in channel Documanía (in the Spanish Digital Plus platform) broadcasting from January 2005 to 2007, showing TV material from a wide range of NGOs like Red Cross, Intermón, Oxfam, Amnesty International, etc. It was awarded with the second prize for TV by UNICEF(2005).

Humania was the first broadcasting program created by a Foundation (Mundo21, registered in Spain) and probably is a pioneer initiative in Europe.

Since mid-2007, TV material is offered directly and worldwide through the web site, including sections with daily news in Spanish (Noticias), Radio and Agenda, all of it focused in news from the third sector.

Fundación Mundo 21 is the result of more than 10 years working for the implementation of information technologies for human development, education and knowledge exchange.
