= Anime on Demand =

German video on demand service

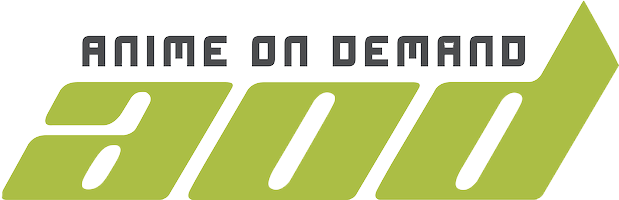
- Company type: Division
- Website type: Video streaming service
- Founded: 2007; 19 years ago
- Dissolved: 8 December 2021; 4 years ago
- Headquarters: Berlin, Germany
- Industry: Anime industry, anime and video on demand
- Parent: AV Visionen (2007–2009); Crunchyroll EMEA (2009–2021)
- Website: anime-on-demand.de
- Registration: Free trial, pass needed
- Current status: Closed; content merged to Crunchyroll

Anime on Demand was a German video on demand service that specialised in the streaming of anime within German-speaking markets. Before the service's closure on 8 December 2021, Anime on Demand was owned by the Crunchyroll EMEA division of Crunchyroll, LLC.

== History ==
Anime on Demand was founded in 2007 by anime distributor AV Visionen as a subsidiary, and was the first legal anime streaming service in German-speaking countries. Following the acquisition of AV Visionen by Viz Media Europe in 2009, Anime on Demand was merged into AV Visionen as a division, dissolving Anime on Demand GmbH.

In April 2011, Viz Media Europe subsidiary Kazé launched the Anime on Demand in the United Kingdom and Ireland, in collaboration with British anime distributors Manga Entertainment, Beez Entertainment and MVM Entertainment. Initially hosted by Anime News Network, Version 1.0 of the site, hosted by Viz Media Europe, launched as an open beta in December 2011.

== Closure ==
In December 2013, Anime on Demand announced it was closing operations in the United Kingdom and Ireland, and was to be incorporated into Animax UK.

In September 2021, it was announced that Anime on Demand would be shutting down on 8 December 2021, with all content being merged into Crunchyroll.

== Anime streamed in UK ==
- A Dark Rabbit Has Seven Lives
- [C]
- Dantalian
- Deadman Wonderland
- Future Diary
- Lagrange: The Flower of Rin-ne
- Maken-ki!
- Maoyu
- My Teen Romantic Comedy SNAFU
- Nichijou
- Nura: Rise of the Yokai Clan
- R-15
- Persona 4: The Animation
- Sekai-ichi Hatsukoi
- Steins;Gate
- Tiger & Bunny
- Twin Angel: Twinkle Paradise
- Un-Go
- Usagi Drop
