= Big Foot (Nico Touches the Walls song) =

Single by Nico Touches the Walls

from the album Aurora
- B-side: "Tomato"
- Released: May 13, 2009
- Genre: Alternative rock, experimental rock
- Length: 4:50
- Label: Ki/oon Records

Nico Touches the Walls singles chronology
"Broken Youth" (2008)	"Big Foot" (2009)	"Hologram" (2009)

"Big Foot" (ビッグフット) is the fourth major single by the Japanese band Nico Touches the Walls from their second studio album Aurora.

"Big Foot" contains five live tracks from their previous successes, all performed during the last show of their tour called Tour 2008 Bon Voyage, Etranger.

== Chart position ==
The single was released on May 13, 2009, and reached number 24 on the Oricon Chart in Japan, that year.

== Track listing ==
1. Big Foot
2. Tomato
3. (My Sweet) Eden (Live)
4. B.C.G. (Live)
5. Kumo Sora no Akuma (Live)
6. Broken Youth (Live)
7. Etranger (Live)
