= Diver (Nico Touches the Walls song) =

Single by Nico Touches the Walls

from the album Passenger
- B-side: "Yuunjou Sanka"
- Released: January 12, 2011
- Genre: Alternative rock, power pop
- Label: Ki/oon Records
- Songwriter: Tatsuya Mitsumura

Nico Touches the Walls singles chronology
"Sudden Death Game" (2010)	"Diver" (2011)	"Te o Tatake" (2011)

"Diver" is the eighth single by Japanese rock band Nico Touches the Walls, released on January 12, 2011, from their third studio album Passenger. The song was featured as the 8th opening of the anime Naruto: Shippuden, from October 2010.

== Background ==
In 2010, of all the new songs performed during the tour "Michi Naki Michi", "Diver" had the most requests to be released as a single. At the request of fans, the band brushed up the song, rearranging it after its initial concert version and presented it as the opening theme for "Naruto Shippuden". The coupling track, "Yuujou Sanka", has only been performed once, at NICO's first ever one-band show, and the song had nearly disappeared. It was performed again during NICO's first school festival tour, and was widely talked about. It's an innovative song, filled with memories from Mitsumura's (vocal, guitar) own school festival. The bonus tracks were recorded at CC Lemon Hall, on October 7, at the 2010 concert "EastxWest Apollo and Luna ~Night of Luna~".

== Promotion ==
The song was the eighth opening from the anime television series Naruto: Shippuden. It was the band's second tie-up with the Naruto franchise, after "Broken Youth" (used as the sixth ending).

== Track listing ==
1. "Diver"
2. "Yuunjou Sanka"
3. "Broken Youth" (Live Version)
4. "Diver" (Live Version)

== Chart position ==
The single is the most successful of the band to date, reaching number seven in the Oricon Chart in Japan. When the song was distributed early as a ring tone, it earned NICO their first number one ranking on RecoChoku's daily chart, and it was number two on the monthly chart.
