= Aurora (Nico Touches the Walls album) =

Studio album by Nico Touches the Walls
- Released: November 25, 2009
- Genres: Alternative rock, power pop
- Length: 51:00
- Label: Ki/oon Records
- Producers: Nico Touches the Walls; Seiji Kameda

Nico Touches the Walls chronology
Who Are You? (2008)	Aurora (2009)	Passenger (2011)

Singles from Aurora
- 1. "Big Foot" Released: May 13, 2009; 2. "Hologram" Released: August 12, 2009; 3. "Kakera -Subete no Omoitachi he-" Released: November 4, 2009

Aurora is the second full-length album released by Nico Touches the Walls in Japan on November 25, 2009, through Ki/oon Records. The album has three songs from the previous singles: "Kakera -Subete no Omoitachi he- ", "Big Foot" and including the opening song to Fullmetal Alchemist: Brotherhood, "Hologram". The album peaked at number 17 on the Oricon Albums Chart.

== Track listing ==
No.	Title	Length
1.	"Aurora (オーロラ)"	1:43
2.	"Hologram (ホログラム)"	4:08
3.	"Me (芽)"	4:55
4.	"Lonesome Ghost"	3:49
5.	"Big Foot (ビッグフット)"	4:53
6.	"Kakera -subete no omoitachi he- (かけら～総べての想いたちへ～)"	4:56
7.	"Sabitekita (錆びてきた)"	3:36
8.	"Leo (レオ)"	5:06
9.	"N Kyoku to N Kyoku (N極とN極)"	2:55
10.	"Fūjin (風人)"	4:22
11.	"Nami (波)"	4:44
12.	"Tomato (トマト)"	6:23
Total length:		51:00
