= Natsu no Daisankakkei =

Single by Nico Touches the Walls

from the album Shout to the Walls!
- B-side: "Yūdachi March" "Rappa to musume"
- Released: May 16, 2012
- Genre: Alternative rock, power pop
- Label: Ki/oon Records

Nico Touches the Walls singles chronology
"Te o Tatake" (2011)	"Natsu no Daisankakkei" (2012)	"Yume 1 Go" (2012)

"Natsu No Daisankakkei" is the tenth single by the Japanese rock band Nico Touches the Walls, released on May 16, 2012.

"Natsu no Daisankakkei" is a summer love song featured on the 2012 Calpis Water commercial. For its coupling track, the single includes a new song written and composed by Furumura Daisuke called "Yudachi March". It also contains a cover of Shizuko Kasagi's "Rappa to Musume", the band's first cover song to be featured on a single.

The single comes in three versions: CD only, CD+DVD and a special pack. The limited edition contains a DVD with a live footage of "Natsu no Daisankakkei" performed live at the Makuhari Messe concert in Chiba, and also includes documentary footage of the Calpis Water commercial shoot. The limited special pack is called "Nico Nico Pack", which contains the music video compilation "Library 2", was released on the same day.

== Promotion ==
The song was presented live for the first time in the "Humania Tour" in Chiba, on March 20, 2012, and was featured as theme song for the 2012 Calpis Water commercial, which was nationwide broadcast also on March 20. On March 21, the song was released as a digital download through Chaku Uta. On May 16, 2012, the band performed an outdoor concert at Yoyoga Park, in Tokyo, to celebrate the new song. The single was re-released in new cover, on July 25, with the live DVD "Ground of Humania 2012.3.20 in Makuhari".

== Chart position ==
"Natsu no Daisankakkei" reached 16 in its first week on the oricon chart in Japan.

== Track listing ==
=== CD ===
1. "Natsu no Daisankakkei"
2. "Yūdachi March"
3. "Rappa to Musume"
4. "Natsu no Daisankakkei" (instrumental)
5. "Yūdachi March" (instrumental)

=== Limited Edition DVD ===
1. "Natsu no Daisankakkei" (Live version, March 20 Makuhari Concert)
2. "CM documentary"
