= Mr. Echo (song) =

Single by Nico Touches the Walls

from the album Shout to the Walls!
- B-side: "Chain Reaction" "Sweet Memories"
- Released: March 27, 2013
- Genre: Alternative rock, power pop
- Label: Ki/oon Records

Nico Touches the Walls singles chronology
"Yume 1 gou" (2012)	"Mr. Echo" (2013)	"Niwaka Ame ni Mo Makezu" (2013)

Mr. Echo (stylized as Mr.ECHO) is the twelfth single by the Japanese rock band Nico Touches the Walls, released on March 27, 2013. The single is available in a limited edition (CD+DVD) containing a bonus-DVD with highlights from their concerts in 2012, and a regular CD only edition. The song "Chain Reaction" was used as a commercial-song for New Balance Japan, and the song "Sweet Memories" is a cover song by the Japanese singer Matsuda Seiko.

== Track listing ==
=== CD track listing ===
1. Mr. Echo
2. Chain Reaction (チェインリアクション)
3. Sweet Memories

=== Limited edition DVD track listing ===
-Choice collection2012-

1. image training (from "ki/oon20" 2012.4.26 @ LIQUIDROOM)
2. Natsu no Daisankakkei (from "FREE LIVE in Yoyogi Park" 2012.5.16 @ Yoyogi Park Outdoor Stage) (夏の大三角形)
3. Te wo Tatake (from "HIGHER GROUND" 2012.7.28 @ Uminonakamichi Seaside Park Amphitheater) (手をたたけ)
4. Rappa to Musume (from "ALGORYHTMIQUE" 2012.11.16 @ ZEPP TOKYO) (ラッパと娘)

== Chart position ==
The single hit number 19 on the Oricon Chart.
