= Passenger (Nico Touches the Walls album) =

Studio album by Nico Touches the Walls
- Released: April 6, 2011
- Recorded: 2010–2011
- Genre: Alternative rock, power pop
- Label: Ki/oon Records
- Producer: Nico Touches the Walls; Seiji Kameda; Hajime Okano

Nico Touches the Walls chronology
Aurora (2009)	Passenger (2011)	Humania (2011)

Singles from Passenger
- 1. "Sudden Death Game" Released: August 11, 2010; 2. "Diver" Released: January 12, 2011

"Passenger" is the third full-length album released by the band Nico Touches the Walls in Japan on April 6, 2011, through Ki/oon Records. The album features the hit single "Diver", the eighth opening song to the popular anime Naruto: Shippuden, the single "Sudden Death Game" and the song "Matryoshka" that was used as the opening theme for the anime C.

The album is available in a limited "CD+DVD" edition which features an exclusive documentary on the making of the album. It was announced that "Passenger" would also be released in the US, but no official American release date has been announced.

== Title ==
During the band’s split tour with "Flumpool", vocalist Mitsumura Tatsuya revealed the meaning of the name "Passenger" for the album:

Although the title "PASSENGER" can, naturally, be translated as both "traveler" and "someone aboard some method of transportation" (in Japanese), we intend to do it our way. So for us, it means "messenger" someone conveying "passion". “We’ve done so many live performances in the past year and a half… but now that we’ve got our energy and power back, we’re focusing to pour all that passionate zeal into our music. Please look forward to "PASSENGER"!

== Releases and promotion ==
The album contains most of the songs played during the 2010 tour "Michi Naki Michi", but the result of singles released from the album was only two. "Sudden Death Game" was the band's only release in 2010, that was announced as a single during the tour "Michi Naki Michi". "Diver" single was released on January 12, 2011, previously featured as the eighth opening for the anime Naruto: Shippuden months before.

Although a number of singles smaller than their previous albums, two promotional songs from "Passenger" were released: "Mosou taiin A" and "Matryoshka", chosen to be the opening for the anime C, aired in April 2011, by Fuji TV.

== Track listing ==
No.	Title	Writer(s)	Length
1.	"Rodeo (ロデオ)"	Tatsuya Mitsumura	4:05
2.	"Mōsō taiin A (妄想隊員A)"	Tatsuya Mitsumura	4:19
3.	"Diver"	Tatsuya Mitsumura	4:09
4.	"Page 1 (ページ1)"	Tatsuya Mitsumura	4:14
5.	"Kimi Dake (君だけ)"	Tatsuya Mitsumura	5:49
6.	"Survive"	Tatsuya Mitsumura	4:21
7.	"Yougisha (容疑者)"	Tatsuya Mitsumura	5:08
8.	"Yuujou sanka (友情讃歌)"	Tatsuya Mitsumura	4:14
9.	"Matryoshka (マトリョーシカ)"	Sakakura Shingo	5:00
10.	"Sudden Death Game (サドンデスゲーム)"	Tatsuya Mitsumura	5:29
11.	"Passenger"	Tatsuya Mitsumura	7:24
Total length:			54:00

=== Limited edition ===
Disc 1
No.	Title	Writer(s)	Length
1.	"Rodeo (ロデオ)"	Tatsuya Mitsumura	4:05
2.	"Mōsō taiin A (妄想隊員A)"	Tatsuya Mitsumura	4:19
3.	"Diver"	Tatsuya Mitsumura	4:09
4.	"Page 1 (ページ1)"	Tatsuya Mitsumura	4:14
5.	"Kimi Dake (君だけ)"	Tatsuya Mitsumura	5:49
6.	"Survive"	Tatsuya Mitsumura	4:21
7.	"Yougisha (容疑者)"	Tatsuya Mitsumura	5:08
8.	"Yuujou sanka (友情讃歌)"	Tatsuya Mitsumura	4:14
9.	"Matryoshka (マトリョーシカ)"	Sakakura Shingo	5:00
10.	"Sudden Death Game (サドンデスゲーム)"	Tatsuya Mitsumura	5:29
11.	"Passenger"	Tatsuya Mitsumura	7:24
Total length:			54:00

DVD
No.	Title	Length
1.	"Documentary of "Passenger" -Live.Photos and Monologues-"

== Chart position ==
The album reached number 15 on the Oricon chart and number 16 on the Billboard Japan chart.

== Tour ==
On January 21, the band announced that they would be embarking on a nationwide tour titled "Nico Touches the Walls Tour 2011 Passenger: We Are Passionate Messenger”, in April, in order to promote their newest album. The tour began on April 13, in Chiba, counting twelve concerts at announcement time, added a few extra performances later.
