= Te o Tatake =

Single by Nico Touches the Walls

from the album Humania
- B-side: "Sokudo"
- Released: August 17, 2011
- Genre: Alternative rock, power pop
- Length: 4:10
- Label: Ki/oon Records

Nico Touches the Walls singles chronology
"Diver" (2011)	"Te o Tatake" (2011)	"Natsu no Daisankakkei" (2012)

Te o Tatake (手をたたけ, "Clap Your Hands") is the ninth single by Japanese rock band Nico Touches the Walls, released on August 17, 2011, from their fourth studio album "Humania".

The single was announced on their final show of the tour called "Tour 2011 Passenger: We Are Passionate Messenger". "Te o Tatake" is described to have a catchy melody and a powerful message, different from their previous records, and perfect for the summer. The single is also accompanied by another track (b-side) called "Sokudo", an instrumental version of "Te o Tatake" and some live versions for their previous successes recorded in Zepp Tokyo on June 10.

On the album "Humania", released on December 7, 2011, "Te o Tatake" was included in the original version and a bonus track, titled "Te o Tatake (Nico Edition)", with different arrangement of the song.

== Promotion ==
"Te o Tatake" was released on August 17. However, it was first heard on Tokyo FM's Yamada Hisashi Radio Unlimited Friday on July 1. The song was also featured on the LISMO commercial and aired on July 22. A special site was set in tribute of the new song, where fans could send videos of clapping to the site. For fans who preordered the single there was a code to watch the Ustream program on August 21, called "Net Talk and Acoustic Live".

== Music video ==
The music video for the song, was released on July 10, 2011. In it, the members of the band are suspended in the air like puppets, while singing and playing musical instruments.

== Chart position ==
In its first week of release, "Te o Tatake" debuted and peaked at number 15 on the Oricon Chart, making it the third highest-charting single by the band to date.

== Track listing ==
1. "Te o Tatake"
2. "Sokudo"
3. "Te o Tatake" (Instrumental)
4. "Matryoshka" (Live)
5. "Hologram" (Live)
6. "Ame no Blues" (Live)
