= The Bungy =

Single by Nico Touches the Walls

from the album Who Are You?
- B-side: "Simon Said"
- Released: June 4, 2008
- Genre: Alternative rock, experimental rock
- Length: 3:36
- Label: Ki/oon Records

Nico Touches the Walls singles chronology
"Yoru no Hate" (2008)	"The Bungy" (2008)	"Broken Youth" (2008)

"The Bungy" (stylized in all caps) is the second major single by the Japanese band Nico Touches the Walls released on June 4, 2008, from their debut album Who Are You?.

== Chart position ==
The single reached number 42 on the Oricon Chart in Japan.

== Music video ==
The music video for "The Bungy" was released on June 4, 2008, and shows the band playing instruments in a room while there are some dancers around them.
