= C (TV series) =

2011 Japanese anime television series

- C - Control: The Money and Soul of Possibility
- Cover of the first Blu-ray disc featuring Kimimaro Yoga and his Asset, Mashu
- Type: TV series
- Genre: Action, mystery
- Directed by: Kenji Nakamura
- Series composition: Noboru Takagi
- Music by: Taku Iwasaki
- No. of episodes: 11

Production
- Studio: Tatsunoko Production
- Producer: Kōji Yamamoto

Original release
- Network: Fuji TV (Noitamina)
- Release: April 15 – June 24, 2011

C (Note: Originally known as [C] – The Money of Soul and Possibility Control, it has been licensed by Funimation as C – Control. However, Funimation also inconsistently lists it as [C] – Control and [C] Control, and also gives the subtitle The Money and Soul of Possibility. MVM Entertainment and Siren Visual refer to it as C for Control. Out of consistency, this article will only refer to it as C.) is a 2011 Japanese anime television series produced by Tatsunoko Production. The story follows Kimimaro Yoga, an economics student who is introduced to the alternate reality of the Financial District, where people bet their own futures in battles. Entres—the series' term for the fighters—can accumulate large quantities of money by winning but they will have their futures altered if they lose. As the story proceeds Kimimaro starts to perceive the effects of the Financial District's existence in the real world.

The anime was directed by Kenji Nakamura, who was given the opportunity to create a storyline for an original series. Nakamura was affected by the bankruptcy of Lehman Brothers—one of the key events of the 2008 financial crisis—and envisioned a story about economic battles. He was moved by stories he heard during the interviews he conducted with people related to the economics field, and the series became darker in tone during its development. Through macroeconomics jargon, the series addresses trust and the need to act to ensure a better future.

The series was broadcast in Japan on Fuji TV's Noitamina programming block between April 15 and June 24, 2011, before being released on DVD and Blu-Ray discs by Toho. C was Tatsunoko Production's first original anime television series to air on Fuji TV in 27 years, following 1984's Okawari-Boy StarzanS. It was simulcasted with a week's delay by Funimation Entertainment in the United States, by Siren Visual in Australia, and by Anime on Demand in the United Kingdom. The anime also aired in the United States on the Funimation Channel and on Pivot in 2013. Its home media distribution was handled by Funimation in the United States, by Siren Visual in Australia, and by MVM Entertainment in the United Kingdom.

C's premise and core concept have been praised by Western reviewers, who were nonetheless disappointed by the execution of the story and the development of the characters. One of the critics' main concerns was that the story was inconclusive and that some plot elements were not fully worked. Its art received mixed responses but was highly criticized for its use of 3D computer graphics, while the musical score was mainly praised. The series has also been highlighted both as a good action show and as a series that can arouse reflective discussions on economic philosophy.

== Plot ==
C is set in a world where Japan goes through a financial crisis that causes high rates of unemployment, crime, and suicide. The series revolves around Kimimaro Yoga, (Note: Japanese: 余賀 公磨 Yoga Kimimaro) a 19-year-old man raised by his aunt after his father disappeared and his mother died. A scholarship student of economics, his only dream is to live a stable, ordinary life. One day he meets Masakaki, (Note: Japanese: 真坂木) a mysterious man who offers him a large amount of money if he will allow his "future" to be held as collateral. When Kimimaro accepts the money, he becomes an "Entre" (Note: Japanese: アントレ Antore) (short for "entrepreneur") and is drawn into the alternative reality of the Financial District, (Note: Japanese: 金融街 Kin'yūgai) where Entres make transactions using a special currency called Midas Money. (Note: Japanese: ミダスマネー Midasu Manē)

In the Financial District, each Entre is paired with a special creature who personifies their futures known as "Assets"; Kimimaro's Cousin designed and Asset called "raned", an asset that allowed for other users to make their own "sub-assets". Kimimaro is designated to be accompanied by Mashu, (Note: Japanese: 真朱 Mashyu; although "Mashu" is the most commonly used name by sources, including broadcasting networks Animax and Pivot, Funimation officially spelled her name as "Mshyu" when it announced the dubbing, a name that is used by MVM Entertainment and Otaku USA.) a horned girl who can conjure up fire-based attacks. Entres are summoned there once a week to compete against each other, betting their money in a battle known as "Deal". (Note: Japanese: ディール Dīru) Entres who lose all of their money and become bankrupt are banished from the Financial District with tragic consequences to them or their loved ones in reality. Kimimaro first discovers this when he defeats one of his professors, Daisuke Ebara, (Note: Japanese: 江原大介 Ebara Daisuke) who entered Deals to support his family. Daisuke's punishment for bankruptcy is the erasure of his children from history.

Kimimaro discovers that bankruptcy led his father to commit suicide and he finds a reason to continue there despite his disinterest in money and his fear of hurting others. Kimimaro's attitude attracts veteran Entre Soichiro Mikuni, (Note: Japanese: 三國 壮一郎 Mikuni Sōichirō) who wants him to join the Starling Guild, (Note: Japanese: 椋鳥ギルド Mukudori Girudo) whose members' aim is to win by small margins so their victories do not greatly affect reality. Mikuni has a great influence over both the Japanese Government and the whole of Japan's finance market and aims to own Tokyo's Financial District. Born into a wealthy family, Mikuni was a rebel who wanted to be a musician; as his band broke up, Mikuni became a personal assistant to his father. When the elder Mikuni's corporation started to crumble as a result of the financial crisis, he chose to save it, denying his terminally ill daughter Takako (Note: Japanese: 貴子) the funds she needed to undergo a medical procedure unavailable in Japan. Swearing vengeance on his father after Takako fell into a coma, Mikuni bought out his father's company with the money he earned from his first victory in the Financial District to take away the thing his father held most dear. Because of this, Mikuni's Asset, Q, (Note: Japanese: キュー Kyū) is modeled after his sister.

It is later revealed the risk is not limited to the individual Entres' futures. Kimimaro starts to notice a few buildings disappearing in Tokyo. Later, the Southeast Asian Financial District goes bankrupt and starts disappearing, along with Singapore, and parts of Hong Kong and Shanghai. Mikuni uses his ability, "Darkness", (Note: Japanese: ダークネス Dākunesu) to protect Japan from the effects of the district's collapse. In exchange for 20 years of Mikuni's future, Masakaki allows a large quantity of Midas Money to be printed and deposited into Mikuni's account. Mikuni and his colleagues use the Midas Money to invest in failing institutions in Japan. Artificially propping up failing banks and enterprises spares the Japanese economy but causes unintended consequences. People begin disappearing, poverty increases, birth rates decline, and morale drops as the Midas Money starts to invade the real Tokyo.

To investigate the nature of Financial Districts, the International Monetary Fund sends Jennifer Sato (Note: Japanese: ジェニファー・サトウ Jenifā Satō) to become an Entre in Tokyo. Seeing the effects of Mikuni's actions, Sato and Kimimaro try to stop him from using up his remaining future to print more Midas Money. Mikuni defeats Sato after she passes her Asset, George, (Note: Japanese: ジェルジュ Jeruju) to Kimimaro, who confronts Mikuni when he is about to use the Midas Money press in exchange for rest of his future. With the help of Masakaki, Kimimaro realizes he is in possession of a black card, giving him the means to revert the press. A struggle for control over the press ensues, and Mikuni and Kimimaro engage in a Deal. The battle is concluded when Midas Money disappears from the world along with Mikuni's powers, allowing the crisis to pass through Japan without influence. Declared the winner, Kimimaro orders the reversing of the presses and the return of the futures to their original places. With the Assets disappearing as a result, Mashu kisses Kimimaro before she disappears. Kimimaro then returns to reality to find that US dollar has become Japan's official currency and everyone's futures have been returned to them. However, Masakaki appears before Kimimaro and explains to him that the Financial District can reappear.

== Voice cast ==
Characters	Japanese	English
Kimimaro Yoga	Kōki Uchiyama	Todd Haberkorn
Mashu	Haruka Tomatsu	Brina Palencia
Soichiro Mikuni	Daisuke Hosomi	J. Michael Tatum
Q	Saori Gotō	Monica Rial
Masakaki	Takahiro Sakurai	Scott Freeman
Jennifer Sato	Mayumi Asano	Martha Harms

== Production ==
=== Staff ===
C was produced by Tatsunoko Production and was directed by Kenji Nakamura. The script was chiefly written by Noboru Takagi, who was helped by Manabu Ishikawa, Shinsuke Onishi and Kenji Sugihara. Character designs were handled by Mebae, animation character design was done by Takashi Hashimoto, while Yuuho Taniuchi was in charge of art design, and Keiichi Sato was the conceptual designer. Kōji Yamamoto was the main producer, working with producers Makoto Kimura, Daisuke Konaka and Takeshi Yoda. Hashimoto was the main animation director, Hiroshi Itō was the art director, and Yuzo Sato was the CGI director. Taku Iwasaki composed the musical score and Yukio Nagasaki was the sound director.

=== Development ===
The idea of a money-themed anime arose after the bankruptcy of Lehman Brothers in 2008, an event that resulted in the largest bankruptcy filing in U.S. history and is considered one of the key events of the 2008 financial crisis. At first, however, the anime's focus was not on money itself; its premise involved economic battles taking place around the world and the plan was to create something lighter than the final result. The premise changed around January 2010 at the culmination of the recession, when Nakamura perceived a common feeling that Japan would not recover from the crash. After researching the history of currency, between February and August 2010 he conducted over twenty interviews with retired politicians from the Central Bank, finance professionals, college professors, nonprofit organization (NPO) members and other experts. He expected to find a broad consensus but was frustrated by obtaining too many divergent opinions and to know there was no such consensus in economics because it involves human action.

Nakamura was moved by the stories of two interviewees; a trader impressed that U.S. CEOs were dealing with billions of dollars at the same time the Japanese economy was in poor condition, showing his concern for his country on the world stage; and the story of the Future Bank Business Association, an NPO that provided loans to individuals to upgrade their old refrigerators to more efficient models and that received the payment with the difference in energy savings. For Nakamura, both interviews showed the interviewees' desire to help Japan despite their divergent opinions on how to do it. The interviewees made clear Japanese people should act and that they could choose between having stability and poverty or chaos and wealth. Nakamura concluded that not deciding which path to take led to ruinous consequences, that waiting was not an option, and that people should design the future in the present. At the same time, he was worried the Japanese were abandoning their concern for the future generation by pushing financial risk into the future. By hearing inspiring stories, Nakamura pondered why people would try to help someone they had never met; he considers this question and the necessity to act to build a better future to be the main themes of C.

Nakamura appointed Naoki Osaka, the editor-in-chief of economics publisher Toyo Keizai, to be the anime's advisor and concluded he could not make a "light" economic story. Nakamura purposely made the Financial District setting seem other-worldly, although it is connected to the real world. This way he could fulfill one of the missions an anime has in his opinion; to present a difficult and specialized theme in a soft way to an unfamiliar audience. He kept the story as a battle anime as a means of keeping it entertaining, which also gave him the possibility of changing it into a more in-depth media, gradually introducing finance and macroeconomics jargon metaphorically through the battles. On portraying the characters and their reasons to battle, and after reading the gambling-themed manga Kaiji, Naoki and Nakamura tried to avoid depicting money as something that would unequivocally make people crazy, and felt this path should be avoided.

== Themes and analysis ==
Kimimaro's objectives in life were interpreted as representing those of an average 21st-century person. When he succeeds in the Financial District, the other characters say it is a rarity for a newcomer, which was interpreted as a metaphor for "the difficulty regular people have in finding a secure economic foothold nowadays, when nepotism is rife amongst big money institutes". Kimimaro and Mikuni can be seen as depicting different perspectives about money and the morals of pursuing and accumulating it. Nakamura did not present any view as the correct one, but preferred to leave grey areas for the viewer; "Control asks how far you're willing to go for money – and how far is too far". Others thought it was not a neutral presentation and that "it can serve as a broad treatise against modern economics and globalism". The recurrence of the number 666 was interpreted as a subtle affirmation that "money is the root of all evil".

In the context of a crash, Nakamura may have tried "to reflect the sense of futility and confusion" it caused. In such a scenario, "To most people, money – serious, high level money and the inner workings of the real world finance sectors – is confusing at best, unknowable at worst". The financial markets and credit were highlighted as the anime's focus. One reviewer said the anime could be directed towards the extension of the modern credit ("After we leverage our retirement funds, aren't our futures the next logical step?") or the credit itself ("Is getting money now and working it and its compounding interest off for years to come really that different from trading on future potential for present gain?"). Business and banking were also considered the anime's subject because they were portrayed as "the ultimate form of gambling". The story's exchange of a portion of one's life for money could also be interpreted as a metaphor for wage labor. Following that logic, the Deals become a metaphor for commerce because one takes another person's money, which represents the slice of a person's life. The show also depicts the value of money as a mutually-agreed-upon cultural fiction that can disappear when the agreement breaks, meaning one's life is exchanged for what is merely inked paper.

== Release ==
No.	Episode title		First airing
No.	English	Japanese	First airing
1	Complication	Fukuzatsu (複雑)	2011-04-15
2	Coincidence	Angō (暗合)	2011-04-22
3	Conspiracy	Inbō (陰謀)	2011-04-29
4	Conversion	Tenkan (転換)	2011-05-06
5	Cultivation	Shūren (修練)	2011-05-13
6	Conflict	Kattō (葛藤)	2011-05-20
7	Composition	Sosei (組成)	2011-05-27
8	Confidence	Shin'yō (信用)	2011-06-03
9	Collapse	Hatan (破綻)	2011-06-10
10	Collision	Shōtotsu (衝突)	2011-06-17
11	Control	Mirai (未来)	2011-06-24

The series' eleven episodes were initially broadcast consecutively on Fuji Television's anime-dedicated block Noitamina from April 15, to June 24, 2011. The series was licensed to be simulcasted on the Internet in six territories, including the English-speaking Australia, the United States, and the United Kingdom. Funimation and Anime on Demand simulcasted the series starting from April 21, 2011, on their own respective websites, while Siren Visual made it available through Anime News Network in Australia on April 22. In the United States, the series also aired on the Funimation Channel beginning on January 14, 2013, and on Pivot TV from October 5, 2013. In the United Kingdom, after Anime on Demand went defunct, it was added to Animax UK's streaming site; the first episode was available on March 6, 2015.

The episodes of C were later released on DVD and Blu-Ray in Japan; produced by Pony Canyon, the four volumes were released by Toho between August 19 and November 25, 2011. A rental version of the DVD was also made available by Toho from September 9 and December 9, 2011. In the United States, Funimation released an English-dubbed version of the series in a DVD/Blu-ray combo limited edition set on October 30, 2012; a budget-priced re-release followed on July 19, 2016. In Australia and in the United Kingdom, it was released as a DVD box set with English and Japanese audio available on November 15, 2012, by Siren Visual, and on October 14, 2013, by MVM Entertainment, respectively.

All of the episodes had "Matryoshka" (マトリョーシカ, Matoryōshika) sung by Nico Touches the Walls as the opening theme and "RPG" sung by School Food Punishment as the ending theme. Along with the score composed by Taku Iwasaki, these songs were released in a 24-track original soundtrack CD by Sony Music Entertainment Japan's Ki/oon Music label on August 17, 2011.

== Reception ==
Sales data for C are scarce; the first DVD and Blu-Ray volume sold 460 and 1,180 copies respectively. The anime has been praised for its themes and originality, but is sometimes criticized for its execution and story. UK Anime Network's Andy Hanley wrote that if the series "managed to live up to its lofty ambitions and goals", it would be "an absolute classic". Bradley Meek of THEM Anime Reviews and Carl Kimlinger from Anime News Network (ANN) were more specific on the cause of the problem, saying that despite its unique, interesting concepts, poor writing and the "dully unimaginative narrative mechanics" hinder its potential. Likewise, Luke Carroll, also from ANN, praised it for trying new ideas not previously seen in anime but said it does not deliver them satisfactorily. In a more positive review, Erin Finnegan of Otaku USA said although there was no satisfactory conclusion, viewers wanting something unusual would find it worth watching. The most positive analysis was done by The Fandom Post's Chris Beveridge, who said the series "does all ties [sic] things together well and leaves you with a satisfied feeling about the overall experience".

André Van Renssen from Active Anime and Meek found C to be interesting mainly as an action show. The latter called the Deals "one of the great things about this series", while Carroll found them "surprisingly intense". In opposition, Beveridge praised C for avoiding a sole focus on the battles and providing a show that centers on the characters' actions, highlighting "the tightness of the themes and the gray areas that drive it all home". Finnegan called it a "smart show" that has "thoughtful themes about the economy's effect on people's lives". Although Hanley and Carroll also saw this reflective aspect in a positive light, Kimlinger regarded it as a negative, saying debating economic philosophy is the show's sole point of interest and calling its story "a total and utter bore".

Most reviewers found the story to be inconclusive, including Finnegan, who said the series fails to communicate its points, an opinion shared by Carroll. The latter cited the use of shares, Kimimaro's father and his diary, and the way elements of the story relate to Mashu as aspects that are left unresolved or are not satisfactorily concluded. Another example, highlighted by UK Anime's Elliot Page and Hanley, is Kimimaro's love interest – one of the plot elements that Page said are introduced and then forgotten. Hanley said these oversights and poor characterizations restrain the story's potential. The main problem, according to Hanley, is Kimimaro's passivity, which Kimlinger likewise noted. Meek found the characters' motivations are neither relatable nor interesting, criticizing Mikuni's portrayal as someone who wants to safeguard his ailing younger sister but is prepared to sacrifice the rest of the world. Kimlinger wrote that several characters only embody plot points and have no personalities, while Meek also criticized Mashu and Sato as fanservice characters. Hanley said Mikuni's backstory was a weak aspect that adds little to the story, in opposition to Kimlinger, who found it "surprisingly moving", and Beveridge, who described it as "strong". The most positive analysis of the characters was done by Beveridge, who said Kimimaro is a good lead character and Mikuni "gives it that elevated feeling".

The art of the series has been mainly criticized for the way it handled its 3D computer graphics scenes. Both Carroll and Hanley described the 3D graphics as "hit-and-miss"; the former considered it his biggest complaint about the show, while the latter thought the visuals were "initially eye-catching and expressive". Japanators's Ben Huber said despite poor computer graphics, the overall animation was worthy of compliment. Van Renssen emphasized how it affected the character designs, saying their drawn counterparts are better, but he and Huber noticed the use of CG decreases as the series progresses. Although Finnegan described it as an "art-house looking series" and the character design as appealing and original, Carroll and Page mostly criticized it, with the latter writing that, except for Masakaki, "all of the male characters look downright ugly". Carroll said the character art is "rather average for most of the cast, the notable exceptions being the Assets"; both Van Renssen and Kimlinger praised the Assets and its powers' diversity. While criticizing the characters, Page commended the anime's backgrounds, especially those of the Financial District. Carroll, on the other hand, lamented the Financial District's lack of structural details, such as windows and doors. Kimlinger praised the artwork and called the series "a flashy, elaborately animated treat for the eyes". Beveridge especially praised the Financial District, saying, "The series works a very good look".

One of the aspects that were mostly praised is the series' music. Page said, "One thing I can praise without qualifier is that the background music ... is very good". Van Renssen highlighted the music on summarizing the show's qualities and also praised the opening and ending themes, which Huber called "pretty awesome". The themes were also praised by Carroll, as well as its "moody background music [that] suits the tone of the series well"; he deemed it "an average but solid affair" on the audio aspect. Kimlinger wrote that most of the series' emotions are communicated through "the great Taku Iwasaki's beautiful, moody score". Its sound effects were highlighted by Beveridge because they "drive home its point".
