= Who Are You? (album) =

Studio album by Nico Touches the Walls
- Released: September 24, 2008
- Recorded: 2006–2008
- Genre: Alternative rock
- Length: 55:25
- Label: Ki/oon Records; KSCL-1293

Nico Touches the Walls chronology
How Are You? (2007)	Who Are You? (2008)	Aurora (2009)

Who Are You? (stylized as Who are you?) is the first studio album by Nico Touches the Walls released on September 24, 2008. The album contains their first major singles, such as "Yoru no Hate", "The Bungy", "(My Sweet) Eden" and "Broken Youth", song chosen as the ending for the anime television series Naruto: Shippuden.

== Track listing ==
No.	Title	Length
1.	"Broken Youth - Original Version"	5:11
2.	"B.C.G"	3:51
3.	"The Bungy"	3:36
4.	"Etranger (エトランジェ)"	5:08
5.	"Image Training"	4:53
6.	"Bunny Girl to Danny Boy (バニーガールとダニーボーイ)"	4:24
7.	"Yuugen fujikkou joubutsu (有言不実行成仏)"	4:38
8.	"Hottoshita (ほっとした)"	4:10
9.	"Yoru no Hate(夜の果て)"	4:50
10.	"(My Sweet)Eden"	4:39
11.	"Aoi (葵)"	5:44
12.	"Anytime, Anywhere"	4:21
Total length:		55:00

== Chart positions ==
The album reached number 11 on Oricon Chart in Japan.
