= Humania (album) =

Studio album by Nico Touches the Walls
- Released: December 7, 2011
- Recorded: 2011
- Genre: Alternative rock, power pop
- Label: Ki/oon Records
- Producer: Nico Touches the Walls; Seiji Kameda

Nico Touches the Walls chronology
Passenger (2011)	Humania (2011)	Shout to the Walls! (2013)

Singles from Humania
- 1. "Te o Tatake" Released: August 17, 2011; 2. "Endless Roll" Released: September 7, 2011; 3. "Bicycle" Released: October 21, 2011

Humania is the fourth studio album by the Japanese rock band Nico Touches the Walls, released on December 7, 2011, nine months after their previous album Passenger. The album contains their latest hits, such as "Te o Tatake" (featured on LISMO commercial), "Endless Roll" (theme song from the film Switch o Osu Toki) and "Bicycle" (featured in the drama 11 Nin mo iru!).

The album was also released in a limited edition with two discs (CD+DVD). The DVD which comes with the limited edition has a full acoustic live session, titled "Nico Touches the Walls Acoustic Sessions: Akotachi to Yonde Mite".

== Releases and promotion ==
The song "Te o Tatake" was featured in the LISMO commercial before its release. After that, the band has the song "Endless Roll" featured in the movie "Switch o Osu Toki" released on September 17, 2011. The song was written by the bassist Shingo Sakakura, according to him, the music conveys a sense of hope that referencing back to the story."Endless Roll" was available for digital downloads through mobile phones as a digital single from the album.

"Bicycle" was a theme song for the comedy home drama "11 nin mo iru", aired in October 2011 by TV Asahi. As "Endless Roll", the song was also available for digital download on October 21, as digital single.

== Music videos ==
Three music videos were made from the album: The first one, for the single "Te o Tatake", released on July 10. For "Endless Roll" a promotional video was released on September 7, 2011. Only a short one-minute version was uploaded on YouTube. It shows Mitsumura walking in a tunnel in the same direction as the light behind him with some effects of lights on his face. Their next promotional video was "Bicycle". On November 11, the video was released and first aired on Space Shower TV in Japan. Later it was also uploaded on YouTube, but only for Japanese viewers. It shows the band in motion pictures, while singing the song in a large empty field, where the camera gives an idea of a bicycle around them.

== Track listing ==
No.	Title	Length
1.	"Heim"	1:36
2.	"衝突 (Shōtotsu)"	4:07
3.	"バイシクル (Bicycle)"	4:40
4.	"カルーセル (Carousel)"	4:26
5.	"極東ID (Far East ID)"	4:08
6.	"恋をしよう(Koi o Shiyō)"	5:22
7.	"Endless Roll"	5:01
8.	"業々 (Gyōgyō)"	3:19
9.	"Demon (Is There?)"	5:35
10.	"Te o Tatake"	4:18
11.	"Te o Tatake (手をたたけ Nico Edition)"	4:28
Total length:		47:00

=== Limited edition ===
No.	Title	Length
1.	"Heim"	1:36
2.	"Shōtotsu (衝突)"	4:07
3.	"Bicycle (バイシクル)"	4:40
4.	"Carousel (カルーセル)"	4:26
5.	"Far East ID (極東ID )"	4:08
6.	"Koi o Shiyō (恋をしよう)"	5:22
7.	"Endless Roll"	5:01
8.	"Gyōgyō (業々)"	3:19
9.	"Demon (Is There?)"	5:35
10.	"Te o Tatake (手をたたけ)"	4:18
11.	"Te o Tatake (手をたたけ Nico Edition)"	4:28
Total length:		47:00

DVD
No.	Title	Length
1.	""Nico Touches the Walls Live Sessions""

== Chart position ==
The album debuted at number ten on Oricon Chart, the band's first top ten album.

== Tour ==
To promote the album, the band announced a nationwide tour for January 2012, called "Tour2012Humania". It was a 10-stop tour, that started at Yokohama Blitz on January 13, and ended at Zepp Sendai on February 25, but later, after seven dates of "Humania Tour" was sold out, the band announced five additional performances called "Ground of Humania", finishing the tour at Naha Central Hall on March 25. Information for tickets pre-orders were included in their single "Te o Tatake", released on August 17.
