= Yume 1 Go =

Single by Nico Touches the Walls
- B-side: "Kessen wa Kinyoubi","Live from ALGORHYTMIQUE", "Live from ALGORHYTMIQUE", "Live from ALGORHYTMIQUE"
- Released: December 19, 2012
- Genre: Alternative rock, power pop
- Label: Ki/oon Records

Nico Touches the Walls singles chronology
"Natsu no Daisankakkei" (2012)	"Yume 1 Go" (2012)	"Mr. Echo" (2013)

"Yume 1 Go" (夢１号, Yume Ichi-gō) is the eleventh single by the Japanese rock band Nico Touches the Walls, released on December 19, 2012. The song was used as the December opening for the TV program CDTV. It was said by Mitsumura that he composed the song during a dream.

== Track listing ==
1. Yume 1-gou (夢1号; No. 1 Dream)
2. Kessen wa Kinyōbi
3. Fuujin "Live from ALGORHYTMIQUE" (風人) (Bonus Track)
4. Bicycle "Live from ALGORHYTMIQUE" (バイシクル) (Bonus Track)
5. Me "Live from ALGORHYTMIQUE" (芽) (Bonus Track)

== Chart position ==
The single reached number 14 on the Oricon Chart and charted for 3 weeks.
