= Motohiro Hata discography =

Artist discography

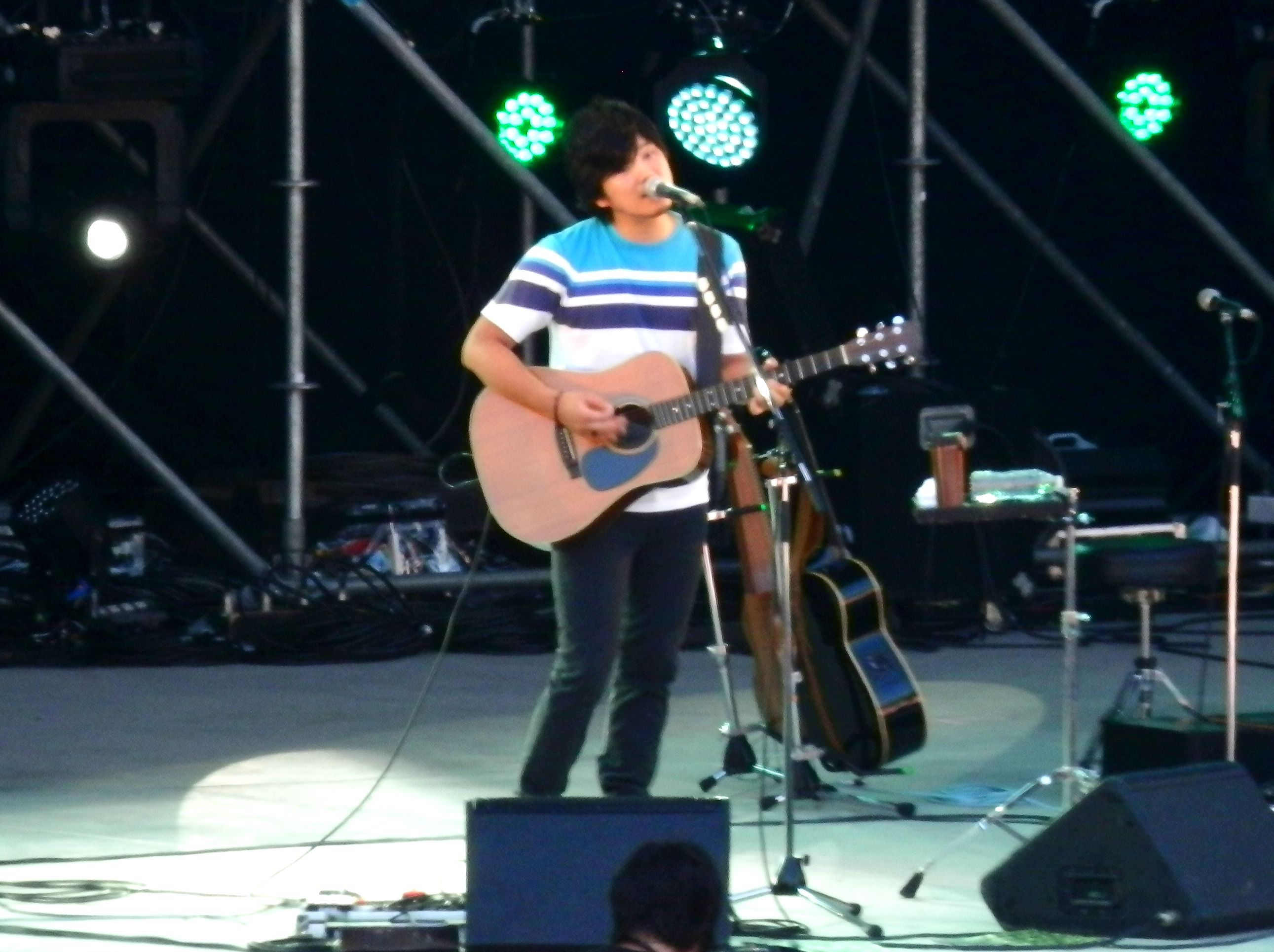
- Motohiro Hata performing at the Join Alive Rock Festival, Iwamizawa, Hokkaido (2013)
- Studio albums: 8
- EPs: 4
- Live albums: 2
- Compilation albums: 2
- Singles: 23
- Video albums: 7

The discography of Motohiro Hata, a Japanese singer-songwriter, consists of eight studio albums, four extended plays, two live albums, two compilation albums, seven Video albums, and 23 singles.

== Albums ==
=== Studio albums ===
Title	Album details	Peak chart positions		Sales (JPN)	Rating
Title	Album details	JPN	KOR Overseas (Note: The Gaon Albums Chart was established in 2010.) (Note: Week references for Gaon: Best of Green Mind '09 and Signed Pop)	Sales (JPN)	Rating
Contrast (コントラスト, Kontorasuto)	Released: September 26, 2007; Label: BMG Japan (AUCK-11010); Formats: CD, digital download	5	—	60,000	AllMusic
Alright	Released: October 29, 2008; Label: BMG Japan (AUCK-11014); Formats: CD, digital download	7	—	56,000	AllMusic
Documentary	Released: October 6, 2010; Label: BMG Japan; Formats: CD, digital download	3	—	62,500	AllMusic
Signed Pop	Released: January 30, 2013; Label: Ariola Japan; Formats: CD, digital download	3	24	41,975	
Ao no Kōkei (青の光景; "Sight of the Blue")	Released: December 16, 2015; Label: Ariola Japan; Format(s): CD, CD+DVD, digital download	2	—	73,000	
Copernicus (コペルニクス)	Released: December 11, 2019; Label: Universal Japan; Format(s): CD, digital download	6	—	13,600	
Paint Like a Child	Released: March 22, 2023; Label: Universal Japan; Format(s): CD, digital download	9	—	7,282	
Hata Expo: The Collaboration Album	Released: November 20, 2024; Label: Universal Japan; Format(s): CD, digital download	15	—	5,514	
"—" denotes items which were released before the creation of the Gaon chart, or items that failed to chart.

=== Compilation albums ===
Title	Album details	Peak chart positions	Sales (JPN)	Certifications
Title	Album details	JPN	Sales (JPN)	Certifications
Hitomimibore (ひとみみぼれ)	Released: October 16, 2013; Label: Ariola Japan; Formats: CD, 2CD, digital download	4	24,000	
Evergreen	Released: October 29, 2014; Label: Ariola Japan; Formats: 2CD, digital download	6	38,000	JPN: Gold
All Time Best Hata Motohiro (All Time Best ハタモトヒロ)	Released: June 14, 2017; Label: Ariola Japan; Formats: 2CD, digital download	1	112,000	

=== Live albums ===
Title	Album details	Peak chart positions		Sales (JPN)
Title	Album details	JPN	KOR Overseas	Sales (JPN)
Best of Green Mind '09	Released: March 3, 2010; Label: Ariola Japan (AUCL-22); Formats: 2CD, digital download	8	72	45,100
Best of Green Mind 2010 (Note: Limited release as a set with "Minazuki" single.)	Released: June 15, 2011; Label: Ariola Japan; Format(s): CD	14	—	

=== EPs ===
Title	Album details	Peak chart positions	Sales (JPN)
Title	Album details	JPN	Sales (JPN)
Orange no Haikei no Akai Seibutsu (オレンジの背景の赤い静物; "Red Object with an Orange Background")	Released: January 20, 2004; Label: Add Nine Records (ANR-1); Formats: CD	—	
Bokura o Tsunagu Mono (僕らをつなぐもの; "Things that Tie Us Together")	Released: March 7, 2007; Label: BMG Japan (AUCK-18016); Formats: CD	11 (Note: The peak position noted here corresponds to the peak of the 2009 "Premium Edition". The original 2007 edition peaked at number 50 on the chart.)	10,000
Shibuya-Ax '07 (Note: The EP was a digital only release.)	Released: March 26, 2008; Label: BMG Japan; Format: Digital download	—	
End Roll	Released: February 8, 2012; Label: Ariola Japan; Formats: CD	9	

== Singles ==
=== As lead artist ===
List of singles, with selected chart positions
Title	Year	Peak chart positions		Sales (JPN)	Certifications	Album
Title	Year	JPN Oricon	JPN Hot 100 (Note: The Japan Hot 100 was established in February 2008.) (Note: Sources for chart positions are as follows: "Kimi, Meguru, Boku", "Niji ga Kieta Hi", "Dance Baby Dance", "Forever Song", "Asa ga Kuru Mae ni", "Halation", "Ai", "Tōmei Datta Sekai", "Metro Film", "Parallel", "Minazuki", "Toranoko", "End Roll", "Altair", "Dear Mr. Tomorrow", "Down Town Christmas (Reprise)", "Hatsukoi", "Goodbye Isaac", "Kotonoha", "Rain", "Girl", "Dialogue Monologue", "Himawari no Yakusoku", "Suisai no Tsuki", "Q&A", "Seinaru Yoru no Okurimono", and "Sumire", "Ringo".)	Sales (JPN)	Certifications	Album
"Synchro" (シンクロ, Shinkuro)	2006	44	—	5,500		Bokura o Tsunagu Mono
"Uroko" (鱗 (うろこ); "Fish Scales")	2007	25	— (Note: Charted at number 62 on the Hot Airplay Chart in 2014.)	16,300	JPN (streaming): Platinum	Contrast
"Aoi Chō" (青い蝶; "Blue Butterfly")	2007	22	—	7,800		Contrast
"Kimi, Meguru, Boku" (キミ、メグル、ボク; "You, Turn, Me")	2008	15	2	17,100		Alright
"Niji ga Kieta Hi" (虹が消えた日; "The Day the Rainbow Disappeared")	2008	13	8	16,000		Alright
"Forever Song" (フォーエバーソング, Fōebā Songu)	2008	10	8	14,400		Alright
"Asa ga Kuru Mae ni" (朝が来る前に; "Before the Morning Comes")	2009	5	5	21,300		Documentary
"Halation"	2009	10	3	18,400		Documentary
"Ai" (アイ; "Love")	2010	5	5	23,940	JPN (PC): Gold; JPN (download): Platinum	Documentary
"Tōmei Datta Sekai" (透明だった世界; "Formerly Transparent World")	2010	13	8	17,300		Documentary
"Metro Film" (メトロ・フィルム, Metoro Firumu)	2010	11	9	12,100		Documentary
"Minazuki" (水無月; "June")	2011	14	8	12,000		Signed Pop
"Altair" (アルタイル)	2012	17	14	6,000		Signed Pop
"Dear Mr. Tomorrow"	2012	18	7	7,000		Signed Pop
"Hatsukoi" (初恋; "First Love")	2013	14	11	6,000		Signed Pop
"Goodbye Isaac" (グッバイ・アイザック)	2013	14	26	6,000		Signed Pop
"Kotonoha" (言ノ葉; "Words")	2013	11	9	11,000		All Time Best Hata Motohiro
"Girl" (Note: Released as a limited edition vinyl record in 2013.)	2013	—	33			Signed Pop
"Dialogue Monologue" (ダイアローグ・モノローグ)	2014	9	10	16,000		Ao no Kōkei
"Himawari no Yakusoku" (ひまわりの約束; "Promise of a Sunflower")	2014	10	2	25,000	JPN (download): Million	Ao no Kōkei
"Suisai no Tsuki" (水彩の月)	2015	9	6	10,000		Ao no Kōkei
"Q&A"	2015	17	10	9,000		Ao no Kōkei
"Sumire" (スミレ)	2016	16	9	9,000		All Time Best Hata Motohiro
"70 Billion Pieces / Owari no Nai Sora" (70億のピース / 終わりのない空)	2016	12	x	12,000		All Time Best Hata Motohiro
"Girl"	2017	15	x	6,200		Signed Pop
"Raspberry Lover"	2019	16	x	5,900		Copernicus
"—" denotes items which were released before the creation of the Billboard Japan Hot 100, or items that did not chart.

=== As featured artist ===
List of singles, with selected chart positions
Title	Year	Peak chart positions		Sales (JPN)	Certifications	Album
Title	Year	JPN Oricon	JPN Hot 100	Sales (JPN)	Certifications	Album
"Dance Baby Dance" (as member of Fukumimi)	2008	3	45	39,000		10th Anniversary Songs: Tribute to Coil
"Natsu wa Kore Kara da!" (夏はこれからだ!; "Summer Is from Now!") (as member of Fukumimi)	2008	3	7	39,000		10th Anniversary Songs: Tribute to Coil
"Parallel" (パラレル, Parareru) (Tomita Lab featuring Motohiro Hata)	2009	11	17	5,400		Shipahead
"Down Town Christmas (Reprise)" (Kyōko with Motohiro Hata and Yū Sakai)	2010	93	61			—
"Akari" (灯り) (Straightener × Motohiro Hata)	2017	19	27			Future Soundtrack / Hata Expo: The Collaboration Album

=== Promotional singles ===
List of promotional singles, with selected chart positions
Title	Year	Peak chart positions	Album
Title	Year	JPN Hot 100	Album
"Forever Song (Live At the Room)"	2008	—	—
"Spark"	2009	—	This Is for You: The Yellow Monkey Tribute Album
"Kanojo no Koibito" (彼女の恋人)	2011	—	We Love Mackey
"Seinaru Yoru no Okurimono" (聖なる夜の贈り物; "Gift of the Divine Night")	2015	22	Ao no Kōkei

=== Other charted songs ===
List of songs not released as singles or promotional singles, with selected chart positions and certifications
Title	Year	Peak chart positions	Certifications	Album
Title	Year	JPN Hot 100	Certifications	Album
"Toranoko" (トラノコ)	2012	74		End Roll
"End Roll"	2012	8		End Roll
"Rain"	2013	64	JPN (download): Gold	Evergreen
"Ringo" (with Musamune Kusano)	2024	33		Hata Expo: The Collaboration Album

== Other appearances ==
Song	Year	Album
"Sorosoro Ikanakucha" (そろそろいかなくちゃ; "Soon I Have to Go") (Takuya Ōhashi and Motohiro Hata)	2008	"Hajimari no Uta" (single)
"Cry & Smile!!"	2008	"Canvas / Kimi wa Suteki" (single)
"64" (as Fukumimi)	2008	10th Anniversary Songs: Tribute to Coil
"Rāmen '95" (ラーメン '95, Noodles '95) (as Fukumimi, with Takuya Ōhashi)	2008	10th Anniversary Songs: Tribute to Coil
"Ano Toki Kimi wa Wakakatta" (あの時君は若かった; "You Were Young Then") (Hiroshi Kamayatsu featuring Motohiro Hata)	2009	1939: Monsieur
"Colorful" (among Colorful - Ai, Motohiro Hata, Little Glee Monster, Daichi Miura, Perfume, Taemin (Shinee), Miyavi, Nasty C, Sabrina Carpenter, Ayumu Imazu, Blue Vintage, Mizki, Sanari and Chikuzen Sato (Sing Like Talking))	2021	—

== Videography ==
=== Video albums ===
List of media, with selected chart positions
Title	Album details	Peak chart positions	
Title	Album details	JPN DVD	JPN Blu-ray
Live at Budokan	Released: September 16, 2009; Label: Ariola Japan; Format(s): DVD	13	—
Best Music Clips 2006–2011	Released: November 23, 2011; Label: Ariola Japan; Format(s): DVD	18	—
Green Mind at Budokan	Released: June 27, 2012; Label: Ariola Japan; Format(s): DVD, Blu-ray	171	18
Live at Osaka-Jo Hall: 5th Anniversary	Released: November 23, 2011; Label: Ariola Japan; Format(s): DVD, Blu-ray	167	17
Green Mind 2012 (Note: Coupled with "Kotonoha" single, as a bonus DVD.)	Released: May 29, 2013; Label: Ariola Japan; Format(s): DVD, Blu-ray	—	—
Signed Pop Tour	Released: December 25, 2013; Label: Ariola Japan; Format(s): DVD, Blu-ray	119	43
Hata Motohiro Visionary Live 2013 (Historia)	Released: April 30, 2014; Label: Ariola Japan; Format(s): DVD, Blu-ray	102	16
"—" denotes items that did not chart.
