= Setsuji =

- Gender: Male

Origin
- Origin: Japanese
- Meaning: Different meanings depending on the kanji used

Setsuji (written: 節治 or せつじ in hiragana) is a masculine Japanese given name. Notable people with the name include:

- Setsuji Satō (佐藤 せつじ; born 1974), Japanese actor and voice actor
- Setsuji Tanaka (田中 節治; 1909–2001), Japanese rower
