= Naruto: Shippuden season 10 =

Naruto: Shippuden
- Season 10
- Season 10 Cover
- No. of episodes: 25

Release
- Original network: TV Tokyo
- Original release: February 10 – July 28, 2011

Season chronology
- ← Previous; Season 9 Next → Season 11

The episodes for the tenth season of the anime series Naruto: Shippuden are based on Part II for Masashi Kishimoto's manga series. The episodes are directed by Hayato Date, and produced by Pierrot and TV Tokyo. Released on DVD under the name The Gathering of the Five Kage (五影集結, Gokage shūketsu), the season follows the assemblance of the Kage, the five village leaders attempting to stop Sasuke Uchiha and the remaining members of the Akatsuki while Naruto Uzumaki tries to confront Sasuke. The season aired from February to July 2011. Its first Japanese DVD volume was released by Aniplex on September 7, 2011.

The season's English dubbed version aired on Neon Alley from July 13 to December 21, 2013. The season would make its English television debut on Adult Swim's Toonami programming block and premiere from April 8 to October 6, 2018. (Note: Due to Toonami schedule changes, Naruto: Shippuden was promoted from its usual Sunday morning timeslot later in the block to being near the front of it at 10:00 p.m. ET/PT, meaning it actually aired as promoted on Saturday night. This promotion lasted until December 15, 2018, where thereafter it returned to its standard late night timeslot on Sunday morning.) The season's first episode ran on Adult Swim in its original Japanese audio with English subtitles on April 1, 2018, as part of an annual April Fools stunt by the network, and proceeded to play the same episode in its normal English dub format the following week.

The season contains five musical themes: two openings and three endings. The opening themes are "Diver" by Nico Touches the Walls (used for episodes 197 to 205) and "Lovers" (ラヴァーズ, Ravāzu) by 7!! (used for episodes 206 to 221). The ending themes are "Mayonaka no Orchestra" (真夜中のオーケストラ; "Midnight Orchestra") by Aqua Timez (used for episodes 197 to 205), "FREEDOM" by Home Made Kazoku (used for episodes 206 to 218) and "Yokubō o Sakebe!!!!" (欲望を叫べ!!!!; "Shout Out Your Desires!!!!") by OKAMOTO'S (used for the remaining episodes).

== Episodes ==
No. overall	No. in season	Title	Directed by	Written by	Original release date	English air date
The Gathering of the Five Kage
197	1	"The Sixth Hokage Danzo"; Transliteration: "Rokudaime Hokage Danzō" (Japanese: 六代目火影ダンゾウ)	Masaaki Kumagai	Katsuhiko Chiba	February 10, 2011	July 13, 2013
The Cloud Ninja group consisting of Samui, Karui and Omoi reach the Hidden Leaf Village with a letter assigned for the Hokage from their Fourth Raikage Ay, Tsunade still in a coma while Danzo had been appointed as acting Sixth Hokage by the Land of Fire's feudal lord. Naruto Uzumaki and Sakura Haruno later learned that Danzo has labeled their former teammate Sasuke Uchiha as a Rogue Ninja to be killed on sight, the two seeking out Sai whom Danzo had summoned his mission of tracking down Kabuto to keep tabs on Naruto. After Sai explains that he physically unable to tell Naruto and Sakura anything he knows about Danzo due to a curse mark, the three are confronted by Karui and Omoi who demand intel on Sasuke so they avenge their mentor Killer Bee while revealing their Raikage got Danzo's permission for them to kill him. When the two also revealed that Sasuke is in the Akatsuki, Naruto realizes that Bee is an Eight Tails Jinchuriki and gives Karui and Omoi hope by revealing what he knows of the Akatsuki targeting jinchuriki. He then offers to go with the two Cloud Ninja to tell them anything else they need to know. Meanwhile, Sasuke and team Taka are intercepted by Tobi, who reveals that Bee tricked them into believing they captured him with one of Gyuki's tentacles. Tobi also reveals the village's recent destruction by Nagato and Naruto's increased abilities, revealing Danzo as the new Hokage and that he is attending a Five Kage Summit called as a result of both Sasuke and Nagato's attacks.
198	2	"Five Kage Summit's Eve"; Transliteration: "Gokage Kaidan Zen'ya" (Japanese: 五影会談前夜)	Atsushi Nigorikawa	Yuka Miyata	February 10, 2011	July 20, 2013
After being informed of the turn of events in the Hidden Leaf, Sasuke decides to assassinate Danzo with White Zetsu splitting off from the part of his body holding Black Zetsu to guide team Taka to the site of the Five Kage Summit. The former deeming Sasuke a possible replacement for Nagato's role in their plan once under their full control, Tobi and Black Zetsu discuss Nagato's unexpected betrayal and that Naruto's actions have now forced their hand to prematurely hasten their plan. Meanwhile, as Danzo makes preparations for the summit while assigning one of his followers to eliminate Kabuto and acquire his human experiment research, Karui interrogates Naruto about everything he knows on Sasuke. But Naruto refuses to sell Sasuke out and instead tells Karui to take her anger out on him instead, with Sai and Omoi eventually intervening before Samui arrives to pick up her wards to meet up with the Raikage with the intel they got. Later, while having Sai tend to his injuries so not to make Sakura worry, Naruto tells Kakashi Hatake and Yamato that he intends to convince the Raikage to forgive Sasuke. When the two refuse to allow it, Naruto reveals his encounter with the chakra imprint of Minato. He tells them what the Fourth Hokage told him about the Nine Tails incident caused by Tobi which Kakashi speculates to be possibly the First Hokage's nemesis Madara Uchiha. When Naruto also revealed that Minato professed his belief in him, Kakashi changes his mind as he and a reluctant Yamato agree to escort Naruto to the Five Kage Summit.
199	3	"Enter the Five Kage!"; Transliteration: "Gokage Tōjō!" (Japanese: 五影登場!)	Naoki Horiuchi	Katsuhiko Chiba	February 17, 2011	July 27, 2013
The Five Kage depart from their villages, each one accompanied by two bodyguards, and Danzo is attacked by a group of assassins. He uncovers his Sharingan and wipes out all his attackers effortlessly while Kakashi, Yamato and Naruto depart, tailing Samui's team. White Zetsu guides Taka to the Five Kage Summit in the Land of Iron, a neutral snowy nation defended by samurai. Naruto, Kakashi and Yamato confront the Raikage and Naruto begins to ask him to pardon Sasuke.
200	4	"Naruto's Plea"; Transliteration: "Naruto no Tangan" (Japanese: ナルトの嘆願)	Shuu Watanabe	Shin Yoshida	February 24, 2011	August 3, 2013
Naruto tries to convince the Fourth Raikage Ay to stop the order of execution on Sasuke Uchiha, adamant to the point of falling on his knees as he does not want either his people or those of the Hidden Cloud to kill each other in a cycle of hatred. But Ay scolds Naruto for being foolishly naïve, adding that he intends to convince the other Kage to condemn the Akatsuki and all associates as criminals. Later, after White Zetsu points out Danzo to Sasuke, the Kage summit commences with Gaara explaining that the Akatsuki having targeting Jinchuriki and that he was the only one who requested aid as Onoki chides the younger Kage since any news of lost tailed beast would be a sign of weakness and that it would take the Akatsuki a long time to create a stable Jinchuriki. When Danzo points out that there are exceptions to controlling tailed beasts in short time like Killer Bee and Mei Terumi's predecessor Yagura Karatachi, Ay interrupts the acting Hokage while explaining that he set up the meeting to see who he can trust as his village is the only one where none of the Akatsuki members have originated from. Furthermore, Mei reluctantly reveals her people assumed Yagura was long compromised, Gaara is astonished to learn that the Akatsuki have been employed as mercenaries by the ninja villages in the past with the Hidden Sand's collaboration with Orochimaru being such an example as Ay assumes Danzo had a role in it. After Onoki justifies hiring the Akatsuki to be the result of the Hidden Cloud's own actions to gain further power, Danzo finishes his earlier statement that his sources have told him the Akatsuki is led by Madara Uchiha despite the man having died long ago. It was at this time that the Five Kage Summit mediator Mifune suggests that the Kage to establish the world's first Shinobi Alliance with Danzo as its leader.
201	5	"Painful Decision"; Transliteration: "Kujū no Ketsudan" (Japanese: 苦渋の決断)	Maki Odaira	Yasuyuki Suzuki	March 3, 2011	August 10, 2013
In the Hidden Leaf Village, Sai confronts Sakura over how Naruto's persistent of bringing back Sasuke is because he has always been in love with her and wants to honor his promise to her. Realizing she's inflicted pain upon Naruto, Sakura departs to speak with him as Shikamaru attempted to get her blessing to kill Sasuke to prevent a possible war between the Leaf and the Cloud. At the Summit, Ay is livid over Mifune suggesting Danzo to lead the Shinobi Alliance despite the samurai stating legitimate reasons for his impartial decision. But Mei Terumi's bodyguard Ao, having acquired a Byakugan years ago, discovers that Danzo implanted Shisui Uchiha's Sharingan in place of his right eye and accuses the acting Hokage of manipulating Mifune's decision to Ay's rage. At that moment, White Zetsu appears and reveals Sasuke's presence in the submit before Ay grabbed him. Meanwhile, Naruto is confronted by Tobi.
202	6	"Racing Lightning"; Transliteration: "Hashiru Ikazuchi" (Japanese: 疾走る雷)	Shigeru Mita	Katsuhiko Chiba	March 10, 2011	August 17, 2013
Yamato and Kakashi restrain Tobi, who insists he merely intends to speak with Naruto out of a newfound interest in the youth and agrees to tell him about Sasuke by first explaining Itachi. At the Summit, after seemingly killing White Zetsu by accident, Ay and his bodyguards leave to intercept Sasuke as Danzo justifies his action of influencing Mifune are a necessary to unify the Shinobi Nations which Onoki calls a futile pipe dream. Gaara questions the Kage for compromising their moralities before following after the Raikage, joined by his siblings alongside Onoki's granddaughter Kurotsuchi. At the same time, a fearful Karin and the rest of Taka noting the change in their leader's approach, Sasuke mercilessly dispatches the samurai before Ay arrives. Jugo willingly enters his Curse Mark form as he and Suigetsu fend the Raikage and Darui while Sasuke takes out Cee with a genjutsu so Karin can locate Danzo undetected. But Ay defeats Jugo before engaging Sasuke.
203	7	"Sasuke's Ninja Way"; Transliteration: "Sasuke no Nindō" (Japanese: サスケの忍道)	Kanryou Kishikawa	Yasuyuki Suzuki	March 17, 2011	August 24, 2013
Having revealed the truth of Itachi and the Uchiha Massacre to Naruto, Kakashi, and Yamato, Tobi chides Kakashi's notion that Sasuke would simply return to the Hidden Leaf as he reminds them that Sasuke is a hate-filled Avenger. Tobi tells of how the Sage of Six Paths had two sons and entrusted the younger brother who valued love and friendship with his legacy, causing the power-obsessed older brother to be consumed in enough hate to wage a war that continued through their descendants: The Uchiha and the Senju from which the First Hokage was born into. Tobi explains that Sasuke is the sole heir to the Uchiha Clan's Curse of Hatred and that Naruto has inherited the Senju Clan's Will of Fire, explaining the two are bound to fight each other soon enough before vanishing while cryptically hinting his intent to become "complete". At the Kage Summit, with Suigetsu and Jugo removed from the fight, Sasuke battles Ay while Karin locates Danzo with his sensor ninja Fu Yamanaka and Ao sensing it. Sasuke displays his ability to manifest parts of his Susanoo while manipulating his Amaterasu flames to take out Ay's arm, the Raikage saved from being fully incinerated by Gaara's intervention as he attempted to reason with him. But Gaara is forced to launch a combined assault against Sasuke with Kankuro, Temari and Darui, only for their attacks to be blocked Sasuke's fully manifested Susanoo.
204	8	"Power of the Five Kage"; Transliteration: "Gokage no Chikara" (Japanese: 五影の実力)	Ken'ichi Nishida	Yuka Miyata	March 24, 2011	August 31, 2013
Having faked his abduction by Sasuke, Killer Bee bided his time before emerging from the lake and confiding to the Eight Tails his intent to see the outside world and learn Enka from a man named Kin. Meanwhile, as Kakashi tells Naruto to keep what they learned of the Uchiha Massacre to himself until they know for full details, Sasuke uses his Susanoo to destroy the pillars and cause a cave in. Leaving Suigestu and Jugo behind, the former getting free in the chaos while the latter absorbs a corpse to restore himself, Sasuke has Karin take him to the summit room and attempts to go after a fleeing Danzo who Ao is pursuing. But Mei decides to fight Sasuke, revealing her three Chakra Natures and two Kekkei Genkai while overwhelming the injured Sasuke. Before she can finish him off once trapping him in a room to be subjected to her corrosive mist, Sasuke is saved by the spore clones that White Zetsu secretly laced on the Kage and bodyguards. However, Sasuke finds himself at the receiving end of Onoki's Dust Style attack and appears to have been atomized by the time Ay and Gaara arrive. But Sasuke is revealed to have been saved at the last moment by Tobi, the masked ninja introducing himself to the present Kage as Madara while asking them for a reprieve so he can explain his ultimate goal: Project Tsuki no Me.
205	9	"Declaration of War"; Transliteration: "Sensenfukoku" (Japanese: 宣戦布告)	Kiyomu Fukuda	Masahiro Hikokubo	March 31, 2011	September 7, 2013
After sending Sasuke and Karin to another plane for the former's wounds to be tended too, Tobi explains his intention to unite everyone as one. Revealing he used Nagato's Rinnegan eyes to translate Uchiha stone tablet kept in the Naka Shrine, Tobi tells the Kage how the Sage of the Six Paths was once the Jinchuriki of a primordial monster called the Ten-Tails: The original form of the nine Tailed Beasts. Tobi reveals that the Sage, fearing the Ten-Tails would resume its rampage after his death, sealed the monster's body in what became the moon while its extracted Chakra was divided and given life as the nine Tailed Beasts. Tobi then reveals the Akatsuki's purpose is to gather the Tailed Beasts so he can revive the Ten-Tails and become its jinchuriki as part of his plan to take over the world by casting an Infinite Tsukuyomi to subjugate everyone to his will, revealing Killer Bee's faked capture to Ay. When the Kage refuse to hand over Killer Bee and Naruto, Tobi openly declares the Fourth Great Ninja War on them before leaving. Noting that Danzo is finished once the everyone at the Hidden Leaf learned of his conduct, with Mifune offering his forces while Mei's bodyguard Chojuro provides some intel on Kisame, the Kage proceed to form the first Shinobi Alliance while agreeing that it would be in their best interests to find Bee and place him and Naruto somewhere secluded. Meanwhile, deciding to see for himself if Sasuke truly has taken a dark path, Naruto finds Sakura with Kiba, Lee and Sai as she needs to talk to him.
206	10	"Sakura's Feelings"; Transliteration: "Sakura no Omoi" (Japanese: サクラの想い)	Hiroshi Kimura	Shin Yoshida	April 7, 2011	September 14, 2013
Sakura attempts to release Naruto from his promise to her in retrieving Sasuke by claiming to love him and has given up on their former teammate. But Naruto sees through the real lie as she leaves with Kiba, Lee and Sai to hunt down Sasuke. At the same time, as Mifune deemed him no longer a risk as Killer Bee is alive, Ay is elected leader of First Shinobi Alliance and leaves to find and discipline his brother while the other Kage proceed to meet up with their respective feudal lords to inform them of the change of events. Meanwhile, Killer Bee meets with Sabu and proceeds to learn Enka when they are approached by Kisame and a fight soon breaks out. But Samehada begins draining Bee's chakra substantially and grows much larger while Kisame takes this time to formally introduce himself to Sabu and Bee.
207	11	"The Tailed Beast vs. The Tailless Tailed Beast"; Transliteration: "Bijū VS O no nai Bijū" (Japanese: 尾獣VS尾のない尾獣)	Naoki Horiuchi	Katsuhiko Chiba	April 14, 2011	September 21, 2013
With Ao in pursuit, Fu acts on Danzo's orders to steal back the Byakugan by any means necessary. With a Mind Transfer trap that the Hidden Mist ninja falls for with his mind becoming trapped in a puppet, Fu possesses Ao's body and attempts suicide by decapitation when stabbing the Byakugan out is impossible. But Mei and Chojuro intervene and rescue Ao, with Fu forced to cancel the jutsu and return to his body. Meanwhile, in a display of his skill as the Tailless Tailed Beast, Kisame fuses with Samehada and traps Bee inside of a Water Dome. While Kisame overpowers Bee in his Jinchuriki state before returning to his usual form, he is about to slice Bee's legs off when Samehada intervenes, as it became become fond enough Bee's chakra to heal the Jinchuriki against its user's wishes. Ay arrives at that time and helps a fully healed Bee decapitate Kisame with a combo attack before proceeding to discipline his brother.
208	12	"As One's Friend"; Transliteration: "Tomo to shite" (Japanese: 親友として)	Shuu Watanabe	Yasuyuki Suzuki	April 21, 2011	September 28, 2013
As Jugo and Suigetsu are caught by the samurai, Naruto is confronted by Sai's ink clone and learn about both his peers' agreement about Sasuke and that Sakura intends to personally kill him to free Naruto of the burden she placed on him. The Sand Siblings arrive at that time and inform Kakashi of the events of the Kage Summit, with Kakashi to relay the upcoming war to his village while Gaara tells Naruto that he must consider the harsh truth about Sasuke and consider what "friendship" means to him. Meanwhile, revealed to have met the man during the Uchiha Massacre, Tobi intercepts Danzo who has Fu and his other bodyguard Torune Aburame hold him off while he undoes the seal on his right arm. While Torune manages to inflict Tobi's right arm with his flesh-eating nano-insects, the masked ninja uses his Transportation Jutsu to remove Danzo's bodyguards from the field while ripping off what is revealed to be a prosthetic limb. Tobi then brings a fully healed Sasuke and Karin before Danzo, who finishes unsealing his arm at that point and reveals it to be covered in multiple Sharingan, intending to add the eyes of the two Uchiha to it.
209	13	"Danzo's Right Arm"; Transliteration: "Danzō no Migiude" (Japanese: ダンゾウの右腕)	Yoshihiro Sugai	Daisuke Watanabe	April 28, 2011	October 5, 2013
Kakashi requests Sai's clone to take him to Sakura to stop her from fighting Sasuke, telling Yamato to take Naruto back to the village while sending his ninja hounds ahead of them with information about the Five Kage Summit. But Naruto collapses from a panic attack over the events of learning what Sasuke has become and the prospect of even his friends wanting to kill Sasuke. Meanwhile, furious that Danzo assumes that he learned the truth of the Uchiha massacre from Itachi while deeming him truly a traitor, Sasuke uses his Susanoo to crush Danzo to death. However, Danzo appears to have survived unscathed, and the two begin to battle. Even Amaterasu is ineffective, and Danzo keeps coming back up after what should be a killing blow, due to a mysterious jutsu that is neither a cloning jutsu nor a genjutsu. As Karin notices one of the Sharingan on Danzo's arm close after being fatally cut down, Sasuke inflicts Danzo with a genjutsu in Itachi's image.
210	14	"The Forbidden Visual Jutsu"; Transliteration: "Kinjirareta Dōjutsu" (Japanese: 禁じられた瞳術)	Masato Kitagawa	Shin Yoshida	May 5, 2011	October 12, 2013
Sasuke places Danzo under genjutsu to kill him from behind, only to fall victim to the activation of a paralyzing curse mark placed on him earlier in the fight with Danzo insulting Itachi's act of sparing Sasuke while preparing to finish him off. But Sasuke's memories of Itachi allow him to cancel the curse and evolve his Susanoo as the fight soon recommences, Danzo's arm revealed to had been infused with the cells of Hashirama Senju by Orochimaru to use the Sharingan. At that time, Tobi deduces that Danzo is using the Uchiha Clan's forbidden jutsu Izanagi, which alters enough of the user's reality to avert death. Karin realizes the price for the jutsu is sacrificing a Sharingan for each use, realizing the jutsu's connection to the eyes on Danzo's right arm each permanently closing within 60 seconds of activation. The fierce fight between Sasuke and Danzo soon becomes one of stamina and will, Sasuke revealing he knew of Danzo's trick and that the latter only has a few Sharingan left to continue Izanagi.
211	15	"Danzo Shimura"; Transliteration: "Shimura Danzō" (Japanese: 志村ダンゾウ)	Ken'ichi Nishida Hayato Date	Katsuhiko Chiba	May 12, 2011	October 19, 2013
Sasuke and Danzo's fight comes to an end when they stabbed each other with their blades, Danzo learning too late that Sasuke used his genjutsu to trick the old man in assuming he still have one more Sharingan to sacrifice for an Izanagi. Karin proceeds to heal Sasuke's injuries as a gravely injured Danzo to forced to rip off his right arm as he lost control over Hashirama's cells, the old man forced to grab the girl once regaining use of Shisui's sharingan to use as a hostage. Unbothered by Karin's peril as she is now a useless burden to him, Sasuke shoots his Chidori through her to fatally wound Danzo with the old man attempting to flee before being intercepted by Tobi as the mask ninja intends to take Shisui's sharingan. Danzo, remembering the lesson he learned when the Second Hokage sacrificed himself, uses the last of his strength to activate a sealing jutsu to trap two Sharingan users within his corpse. In his final moments as Sasuke and Tobi escaped the jutsu's radius, Danzo recalls how he never caught up to Hiruzen while lamenting of not becoming a Hokage.
212	16	"Sakura's Resolve"; Transliteration: "Sakura no Kakugo" (Japanese: サクラの覚悟)	Hideaki Uehara	Yasuyuki Suzuki	May 19, 2011	October 19, 2013
As her group draw near to Sasuke's location, Sakura was about to pelt her companions with sleeping gas when Sai stopped her as he figured out her plan while revealing his own intent to stop them. Sakura uses the ensuing battle as a distraction to knock them out before moving forward with her plan to kill Sasuke alone, reminiscing about her history with Sasuke and failure to recognize his transition into who he is now. Back on the bridge, once Danzo's sealing jutsu ended, Tobi takes the old man's corpse so he can extract Shisui's Sharingan while advising Sasuke to finish off Karin as she would mostly likely become detrimental to them both. An injured Karin, recalling first meeting Sasuke in the Forest of Death during the Chunin Exams, finds herself about to be killed by him when Sakura arrives. Sasuke stays his hand as Sakura claims to have abandoned the Leaf Village to be by his side.
213	17	"Lost Bonds"; Transliteration: "Ushinawareta Kizuna" (Japanese: 失われた絆)	Mitsutoshi Satou	Daisuke Watanabe	May 26, 2011	October 26, 2013
Naruto wakes up from dreaming of his fight against Sasuke, finding himself under Yamato's care while learning Kakashi is going after Sakura. With Yamato refusing to let him go after his teammates while told they are returning to the Hidden Leaf, Naruto goes back to bed and uses a Shadow Clone to cover his escape. During that time, Naruto reminisces his history with Sasuke in wanting to be acknowledged by his rival while failing to truly understand Sasuke's pain of losing everyone he loved until Jiraiya's death along with everyone convincing him that Sasuke is a lost cause. While using Sage Mode to track Kakashi, thinking back to Jiraiya's ideals of understanding others and Gaara advising him on what he should do as Sasuke's friend, Naruto believes seeing Sasuke will allow him to decide his next course of action.
214	18	"The Burden"; Transliteration: "Seōbeki Omoni" (Japanese: 背負うべき重荷)	Kiyomu Fukuda	Masahiro Hikokubo	June 2, 2011	November 2, 2013
As Kakashi finds Sai and others while heading towards her, Sakura finds herself being tested by Sasuke when he reveals his new ambition is to slaughter everyone in the Hidden Leaf Village and requests proof of her loyalty to him by killing Karin. Sakura attempts to carry out the deed when Karin indirectly reveals Sasuke is about to kill her. But Kakashi intervenes with a slight advantage as Sasuke begins to suffer the blindness from using the Mangekyō Sharingan. Sakura, spiriting Karin to safety to heal, attempts to attack Sasuke from behind with a poisoned kunai. But Sakura's last second hesitation enables the blind Sasuke to grab the weapon from her, the girl only saved from certain death when Naruto takes the stab meant for her.
215	19	"Two Fates"; Transliteration: "Shukumei no Futari" (Japanese: 宿命のふたり)	Hiroshi Kimura	Shin Yoshida	June 9, 2011	November 9, 2013
Naruto confronts Sasuke and berates him for attacking their teammate, only for Sasuke scoffs that he is no longer a part of Team 7 while stating his goal destroying the Leaf Village as his way to absolve the Uchiha of all the wrongdoings that befell them. Kakashi realizes that the repeated hatred coursing through the Uchiha's history has made Sasuke what he is now. He resolves to take care of Sasuke on his own, Naruto deducing his intentions and uses his clones to restrain him while runs at Sasuke with his Rasengan as Sasuke runs at Naruto with his Chidori. The two clash in a manner similar to what occurred at the Valley of the End, the two ending up in a metaphysical plain where Naruto reveals to Sasuke that, while he used to be alone, he and Iruka pulled him from the brink. He was hesitant to approach Sasuke because he was jealous of his superior abilities, but he bonded with him all the same.
216	20	"High-Level Shinobi"; Transliteration: "Ichiryū no Shinobi" (Japanese: 一流の忍)	Ken'ichi Nishida	Shin Yoshida	June 16, 2011	November 16, 2013
A few flashbacks occur showing the friendships and competitions that Naruto and Sasuke had over the years before their metaphysical discussion comes to an end as Tobi and White Zetsu arrive. Reminding Sasuke of what he told him years ago that high-level shinobi can read each other through their fists, Naruto tells Sasuke that he is prepared to die in their final battle. This causes Sasuke to tell Naruto that he will never change and that he would eventually destroy the Hidden Leaf village, before being spirited away by Tobi. Naruto suddenly falls ill moments later from Sakura’s poisoned kunai, but she heals him by administering the antidote. Meanwhile, to prevent further risk of blindness, Sasuke decides have Itachi's eyes transplanted into him.
217	21	"The Infiltrator"; Transliteration: "Sennyūsha" (Japanese: 潜入者)	Daisuke Tsukushi	Katsuhiko Chiba	June 23, 2011	November 23, 2013
After Naruto is administered the antidote, and Yamato's brief appearance in berating Naruto for getting him in trouble with the innkeeper, he, Sakura, and Kakashi take Karin with them to return to their village while retrieving Sai, Kiba, and Lee who were still out from Sakura's sleep gas. It was then that they run into Anbu from the Foundation, confirming Danzo's death and leaving the organization's fate to the next Hokage which may be Kakashi. Ay and his escort return to the Hidden Cloud Village and hold a council with the Land of Lightning's feudal lord over the events of the Five Kage Summit, gaining their lord's approval while requesting that he meet with the other Feudal Lords. Meanwhile, acting on Tobi's plan to infiltrate the Hidden Cloud, it is revealed that Kisame had hidden himself within Samehada while the "Kisame" that Ay and Bee killed was actually a White Zetsu clone in disguise.
218	22	"The Five Great Nations Mobilize"; Transliteration: "Ugokidasu Taikoku" (Japanese: 動き出す大国)	Masato Kitagawa	Yuka Miyata	June 30, 2011	November 30, 2013
The Feudal Lords agree to formally ratify the Allied Shinobi Forces during a limited televised conference, sending their messengers to the ninja as the Gaara, Mei, and Onoki returned to their villages. Gaara proceeds to hold a meeting among the Hidden Sand Elders to explain what happened at the Five Kage summit and the threat that the Akatsuki now pose to the world, learning of Danzo's death through one of the ninja dogs that Kakashi is sending to the other villages out of good faith. But even as everyone prepares for battle, some of the ninja are reluctant of forming an alliance with their former enemies. At the Hidden Leaf Village, after Shikamaru informed Ino and Choji of what his father told him before they and Team Ebisu welcome home Naruto and the others. Naruto tells Shikamaru to gather all their friends so he can tell them of what occurred while promising to let Team Ebisu interview him later for their newsletter, Konohamaru realizing something is different about Naruto as the youth smiles seeing how much of the village had been rebuilt in his absence.
219	23	"Kakashi Hatake, the Hokage"; Transliteration: "Hokage Hatake Kakashi" (Japanese: 火影はたけカカシ)	Yoshihiro Sugai	Katsuhiko Chiba	July 7, 2011	December 7, 2013
Once his friends have gathered, Naruto insists that they leave Sasuke to him while keeping them in the dark about what occurred to their annoyance. Guy challenges Kakashi again for another match with full knowledge it may be their last once Kakashi officially becomes the Sixth Hokage. While the elders, Shikaku, and Kakashi are attending the conference to appointing the Hokage, Tsunade regains consciousness and is reinstated as the Fifth Hokage.
220	24	"Prophecy of the Great Lord Elder"; Transliteration: "Ōgama Sennin no Yogen" (Japanese: 大ガマ仙人の予言)	Kanryou Kishikawa	Yasuyuki Suzuki	July 21, 2011	December 14, 2013
Gerotora seeks the Great Elder's advice over Jiraya's request to be stored inside of Naruto, the Great Elder requesting Naruto's presence to determine if it is the right course. Meanwhile as a fully recovered Tsunade calls a meeting to prepare for war against the Akatsuki, Naruto manages to elude Konohamaru and his friends to eat at a reopened Ichiraku. But before Naruto can eat free ramen, he is Reverse-Summoned to Mt. Myoboku by Fukasaku and brought before the Elder. Naruto learns that he will meet an octopus and face a youth with powerful eyes, recognizing the latter as Sasuke. When the elder approves of Naruto's answer, he gives Gerotora permission to request the youth to sign the scroll that is the key to consciously manipulate the seal on the Nine-Tails.
221	25	"Storage"; Transliteration: "Kurairi" (Japanese: 蔵入り)	Naoki Horiuchi	Masahiro Hikokubo	July 28, 2011	December 21, 2013
With Naruto hesitant to sign Gerotora's scroll, the toad explains to Fukasaku that Naruto must be mentally able to extract the Nine Tails's chakra while separating it from the monster's will. Naruto, remembering the previous times that Nine Tails took over his body, signs the scroll in hopes to master it so he can fight Sasuke as an equal. After Gerotora forced himself down Naruto's throat, the youth is instructed by the Great Elder that he will meet the octopus from his prophecy on an isolated island. Meanwhile, after fully mastering his new abilities since absorbing Orochimaru's remains into himself, Kabuto Yakushi appears before Tobi while summoning the Reanimated corpses of Itachi, Sasori, Deidara, Kakuzu, and Nagato. Kabuto offers the surprised Tobi an alliance between them, offering his army of Reanimated ninja for Tobi's use in exchange for Sasuke. While Tobi initially refuses, he accepts upon seeing the figure within a sixth casket that Kabuto summoned. But Kabuto also deliberately lured the pursuit group under Anko to the Akatsuki's base.

== Home media release ==
=== Japanese ===
Volume	Date	Discs	Episodes	Reference
1	September 7, 2011	1	197–200	
2	October 5, 2011	1	201–204	
3	November 2, 2011	1	205–208	
4	December 7, 2011	1	209–212	
5	January 11, 2012	1	213–216	
6	February 1, 2012	1	217–221	

=== English ===
Viz Media (North America, Region 1)
Box set	Date	Discs	Episodes	Reference
16	October 8, 2013	2	193–205	
17	January 14, 2014	2	206–218	
18	April 8, 2014	2	219–231	

Viz Media (North America, Region 1 Blu-ray sets)
Volume	Date	Discs	Episodes	Ref.
8	October 28, 2025	4	193–220	
9	January 26, 2026	4	221–248	

Manga Entertainment (United Kingdom, Region 2)
Volume	Date	Discs	Episodes	Reference
16	February 24, 2014	2	193–205	
17	April 7, 2014	2	206–218	
18	July 21, 2014	2	219–231	

Madman Entertainment (Australia/New Zealand, Region 4)
Collection	Date	Discs	Episodes	Reference
16	February 19, 2014	2	193–205	
17	March 19, 2014	2	206–218	
18	June 18, 2014	2	219–231	
