= Kite Liberator =

2008 film by Yasuomi Umetsu

- Poster featuring Monaka (front) and her alter ego, the Angel of Death (background)

カイト リベレイター (Kaito Ribereitā)
- Genre: Action, science fiction, thriller
- Anime film
- Directed by: Yasuomi Umetsu
- Produced by: Mariko Kusuhara; Osamu Koshinaka; Yōko Hayama
- Written by: Yasuomi Umetsu
- Music by: Tomohisa Ishikawa
- Studio: ARMS
- Licensed by: NA: Media Blasters
- Released: April 8, 2008
- Runtime: 60 minutes

KITE Liberator (カイト リベレイター, Kaito Ribereitā) is a 2008 Japanese direct-to-video adult animated science fiction action film and the second installment of the film series. It was directed and written by Yasuomi Umetsu, who previously directed the first film in the series. The film was released on 21 March 2008 on DVD and on 25 November 2014 on Blu-ray. Unlike the first installment of the film series, Kite Liberator does not include an extended cut, and therefore, it is the first film in the franchise not to include sexual scenes.

== Plot ==
Taking place ten years after the events of the original Kite film, this second installment opens with Kōichi Doi, a researcher for Defy Foods, boarding the International Space Station. Doi had been researching methods of preserving bone mass in zero gravity through diet. After widowed father Orudo Noguchi and another crew member are later found to have space radiation exposure and ordered to discontinue missions, Noguchi asks Doi to deliver a package to his daughter Monaka, whom he has not seen in four years, for her birthday.

Meanwhile, in Tokyo, two police officers pursue a violent criminal named Tsuin through the streets and into a train station. After shooting two bystanders in the women's restroom, he takes a little girl hostage and hides in a stall with her. However, the lights go out in the restroom and he is attacked by the female assassin known as "the Angel of Death", who quickly disarms and shoots him, leaving a pile of white feathers on his corpse. Later that night, Monaka, the girl that currently assumes the same murderous tactics as Sawa, goes to work at Apollo 11, a maid café with a perverted regular patron. Monaka plays the part of a nerdy, clumsy high school girl while in public, making her a vulnerable target for harassment. Monaka's older co-worker Manatsu Mukai does not take kindly to that, however, and retaliates in several occasions, such as spiking his drink with habanero or kicking him in the groin. Monaka's manager later receives a phone call from "the real" Tsuin, who names Rin Gaga (one of the two police officers who pursued the pedophile that night) as the other Tsuin's (Tsuin's little brother) killer.

Monaka returns home to find the package from her father, a bracelet made from rocks from Mars. Back on the ISS, Orudo and the other crew member's condition has worsened, their bone volume rapidly increasing. The onboard doctor realizes the condition was caused by a combination of the space radiation and Doi's food, which is allowed to be shipped to the station without proper lab test. The next morning, Monaka makes plans for her next target, a real estate agent who is in fact a serial killer that uses an apartment under his brokerage to carry out murders. After school, she bumps into her manager and sees Mukai with a child. The manager explains that Mukai is a single mother though he does not know what happened to the father. Monaka goes to the apartment. Later, the Angel of Death then proceeds to assassinate her target during the night.

On the space station, Orudo and the other infected crew member have transformed into homicidal, bulletproof monsters who quickly kill most of the crew and ISS police units. They are able to stop one of the monsters by blowing up the space station, though they are unable to find the other. The doctor and Doi, along with the others, are able to escape the station, though the incident draws Defy Food Company to hire agents to get rid of evidence that may jeopardize their reputation. The same night, after working at Apollo 11, Monaka and Mukai converse while playing with fireworks, discussing Mukai's life and reminding her a little of the past. Mukai hints to Monaka the dangers of living a double life. On her way home, Monaka runs into Gaga, the police officer chasing the pedophile a few days before. She offers to buy him drinks and then to quit her waitress job in exchange for him not notifying the school about her working at the maid café as a minor, although he instead agrees to settle with a date. During Monaka's short conversation with him, Gaga warns Monaka against being too trusting of adults.

As one of the monsters from the space station emerges from the sea nearby, agents from Defy Foods demand the doctor's and Doi's silence concerning the space station incident. The next day, Monaka is told that her mission has been deferred as the new priority is to kill the surviving monster, now roaming the city. In preparing for her mission, Monaka's gun choice is noted by the manager of Apollo 11, who says that the same gun belonged to some assassin (Sawa) before she disappeared. The same night, Gaga returns home only to be attacked by Tsuin. After he turns on his TV, Gaga starts the gunfight before Tsuin flees the scene, starting a foot chase. Not so far away, the Angel of Death uses a sniper rifle to engage the monster, only to find it completely bulletproof like the other one. Upon discovering that none of her weapons, including the machine gun and explosive shells work on the monster, which eventually pins her to a wall, she loses one blue contact lens, and the monster recognizes her from her bracelet and eyes. It hesitates, giving her enough time to shoot it through the mouth, which proves to be a weak point, causing the monster to fall onto a passing car that happens to be part of a convoy that Doi is travelling with. He attempts to show affection towards her but she brushes his hand away just before the car explodes. Doi convinces her to join him and debriefs her as the rest of the convoy recovers the remains of the monster, and it is revealed that the monster that she defeated was her father.

After Doi learns that she is actually Monaka, the two agents at the scene attempt to pull their guns on her, but Monaka quickly kills them before executing Doi. While exiting the garage to find her father, Monaka is ambushed by Tsuin, who takes her hostage. Tsuin attempts to threaten Gaga with her life, but Monaka is able to overpower and murder Tsuin. Gaga approaches but finds only Tsuin's corpse and Monaka's hair ribbon. Resuming her attempt to find her father, Monaka runs into the convoy again, only for the truck that is carrying the now regenerated monster to explode. After the monster emerges from the truck, the two make eye contact.

== Cast ==
| Characters | Japanese | English |
|---|---|---|
| Monaka Noguchi | Marina Inoue | Xanthe Huynh |
| Manatsu Mukai | Akemi Okamura | Tara Platt |
| Rin Gaga | Masakazu Morita | Grant George |
| Kōichi Doi | Setsuji Satō | Doug Erholtz |
| Azuki Noguchi | Kei Shindō | Mela Lee |
| Torokurō Amuzu | Mugihito | Joe DiMucci |
| Kai Tsuin, Kichi Tsuin | Yasuhiro | Derek Stephen Prince |
| Orudo Noguchi | Rikiya Koyama | Jamieson Price |
| Sputnik | ? | Kaiji Tang |

== Reception ==
"Umetsu's work has been a favorite of mine since I saw his designs in the Megazone 23 Part II OVA all those years ago as well as numerous things since then. Hopefully it will be another ten years before he can be pulled back to this franchise so he can focus on more interesting projects." — Chris Beveridge, Mania.

"The straight-forward nature of many scenes doesn't quite maintain the goals of the piece as a whole. But taken as a gentle, self-reflective Tarantino-style satire, it works." — Justin Sevakis, Anime News Network.
