= Setsuji Satō =

Japanese actor (born 1974)

- 佐藤 せつじ
- Born: December 6, 1974 (age 51); Tokyo, Japan
- Education: Osaka University of Arts
- Occupations: Actor; voice actor
- Years active: 1990–present
- Agent: Engeki Shūdan Yen

Setsuji Satō (佐藤 せつじ, Satō Setsuji; born December 6, 1974) is a Japanese actor and voice actor affiliated with Engeki Shūdan Yen. He graduated from the Osaka University of Arts.

== Filmography ==
=== Television dramas ===
- Tokugawa Yoshinobu (1998) (Prince Arisugawa Taruhito)
- Called a fake doctor ~ Okinawa · Last medical intervention ~ (2010)

=== Anime series ===
- Turn A Gundam (1999) (Joseph Yaht)
- Boogiepop Phantom (2000) (Delinquent C)
- Midnight Horror School (2003) (Makunero)
- Yakitate!! Japan (2004) (Kageto Kinoshita)
- Zipang (2004) (Sergeant)
- Kekkaishi (2006) (Sekia)
- Dinosaur King (2008) (Zapper)
- Kon'nichiwa Anne: Before Green Gables (2009) (Bert Thomas)
- Naruto: Shippuden (2010) (Kandachi)
- The Tatami Galaxy (2010) (Aijima)
- Cardfight!! Vanguard (2011) (Gai Usui)
- Mysterious Joker (2011) (No. 99)
- Naruto: Shippuden (2012) (Karai)
- Beast Saga (2013) (Foxcon)
- Star Blazers: Space Battleship Yamato 2199 (2013) (Gol Heinig)
- Cardfight!! Vanguard G (2015) (Gai Usui)
- Durarara!!×2 (2015) (Kine)
- Triage X (2015) (D)
- 91 Days (2016) (Cerotto)
- Lupin the 3rd Part IV: The Italian Adventure (2016) (Kōsuke Holmes Akechi)
- Duel Masters (2017) (Decky)
- Altair: A Record of Battles (2017) (Daniel Bieger)
- Devilman Crybaby (2018) (Glasses Mob)
- Fist of the Blue Sky Re:Genesis (2018) (Yasaka)
- Junji Ito Collection (2018) (Ogi)
- Zombie Land Saga (2018) (Death Uncle B)
- Dororo (2019) (Itachi)
- Auto Boy – Carl from Mobile Land (2020) (DJ Navi)
- Yurei Deco (2022) (Hank)
- Tatami Time Machine Blues (2022) (Aijima)
- Ninja Kamui (2024) (Lil)
- Bye Bye, Earth (2024) (King Lowhide (Evil))
- Demon Lord 2099 (2024) (Cornea Sebuld)
- Sakamoto Days (2025) (Mad Horiguchi)
- You and Idol Pretty Cure (2025) (Zakkuri)
- Daemons of the Shadow Realm (2026) (Hayato Shingo)
- Dengeki Daisy (2027) (Masuda)

=== Original video animation ===
- Kite Liberator (1998) (Kōichi Doi)
- Demon Prince Enma (2006) (Kapaeru)

=== Anime films ===
- Turn A Gundam I: Earth Light (2002) (Joseph Yaht)
- Turn A Gundam II: Moonlight Butterfly (2002) (Joseph Yaht)
- Cyborg 009: Call of Justice (2016) (Cyborg 007 / Great Britain)
- Mobile Suit Gundam Narrative (2018) (Amaya)
- Maboroshi (2023) (Mamoru Sagami)
- Patlabor EZY: File 1 (2026) (Yuta Yanai)
- Patlabor EZY: File 2 (2026) (Yuta Yanai)
- Patlabor EZY: File 3 (2027) (Yuta Yanai)

=== Video games ===
- Super Robot Wars Alpha Gaiden (2001) (Joseph Yaht)
- Crash Nitro Kart (2003) (N. Trance)
- Crash Twinsanity (2004) (Moritz)
- Super Robot Wars Z (2008) (Joseph Yaht)
- Star Ocean: Integrity and Faithlessness (2016) (Pavine)
- Resident Evil 7: Biohazard (2017) (Lucas Baker)
- The Evil Within 2 (2017) (Stefano Valentini)
- Daemon X Machina (2019) (Red Dog)
- Ghost of Tsushima (2020) (Kenji)
- Deadcraft (2022) (DJ Zett)
- Anonymous;Code (2022) (Davide Iesue)
- Overwatch 2 (2022) (Ramattra)
- Armored Core VI: Fires of Rubicon (2023) (G1 Michigan)
- Final Fantasy VII Rebirth (2024) (Lonely Geth)

=== Tokusatsu ===
- Shuriken Sentai Ninninger (2015) (Yokai Amikiri)
- Kamen Rider ZEZTZ (2026) (Deathgame Nightmare)

=== Dubbing roles ===
==== Live-action ====
- T.J. Miller
  - Unstoppable (Gilleece)
  - Search Party (Jason)
  - Transformers: Age of Extinction (Lucas Flannery)
  - Deadpool (Weasel)
  - Ready Player One (i-R0k)
  - Deadpool 2 (Weasel)
  - Underwater (Paul Abel)
- Action Point (Ziffel (Johnny Pemberton))
- Alita: Battle Angel (Romo (Derek Mears))
- An Education (Danny (Dominic Cooper))
- Arthur (Arthur Bach (Russell Brand))
- The Assassination of Jesse James by the Coward Robert Ford (Robert Ford (Casey Affleck))
- Back to the Future (2014 BS Japan edition) (Dave McFly (Marc McClure))
- Batman v Superman: Dawn of Justice (Vikram Gandhi)
- Battleship (Jimmy Ord (Jesse Plemons))
- Bedtime Stories (Mickey (Russell Brand))
- Burlesque (Jack Miller (Cam Gigandet))
- Caught Stealing (Henry "Hank" Thompson (Austin Butler))
- Celeste and Jesse Forever (Jesse Abrams (Andy Samberg))
- The Continental: From the World of John Wick (Frankie (Ben Robson))
- Crash & Bernstein (Crash (Tim Lagasse))
- Cry Macho (Aurelio (Horacio Garcia Rojas))
- Disclosure Day (Jackson (Wyatt Russell))
- Doctor Who (Mickey Smith (Noel Clarke))
- Dogman (Doug Munrow (Caleb Landry Jones))
- Drive-Away Dolls (Arliss (Joey Slotnick))
- Fast Five (Diogo (Luis Da Silva Jr.))
- Final Cut (Fatih (Jean-Pascal Zadi))
- Final Destination 5 (Nathan Sears (Arlen Escarpeta))
- Get Out (Jeremy Armitage (Caleb Landry Jones))
- Godzilla (Akio's Father (Warren Takeuchi))
- The Good, the Bad, the Weird (Man-gil (Ryu Seung-soo))
- The Grand Budapest Hotel (Zero Moustafa (Tony Revolori))
- Harry Potter and the Deathly Hallows – Part 1 (Scabior (Nick Moran))
- His Dark Materials (Lee Scoresby (Lin-Manuel Miranda))
- In Time (2025 BS10 Star Channel edition) (Fortis (Alex Pettyfer))
- iZombie (Clive Babineaux (Malcolm Goodwin))
- Jack the Giant Slayer (General Fallon's Small Head (John Kassir))
- Kenan & Kel (Kel (Kel Mitchell))
- Land of the Lost (Cha-Ka (Jorma Taccone))
- Lincoln Rhyme: Hunt for the Bone Collector (Felix (Tate Ellington))
- Lions for Lambs
- Mad Max: Fury Road (2019 THE CINEMA edition) (Slit (Josh Helman))
- Magic Mike XXL (Tito (Adam Rodríguez))
- The Man with the Iron Fists (Silver Lion (Byron Mann))
- Masters of the Universe (Fisto (Jóhannes Haukur Jóhannesson))
- Miss March (Tucker Cleigh (Trevor Moore))
- Mister Lonely (Michael Jackson (Diego Luna))
- The Pacific (Pfc. Wilbur "Runner" Conley (Keith Nobbs))
- Popstar: Never Stop Never Stopping (Conner Friel (Andy Samberg))
- Preacher (Proinsias Cassidy (Joe Gilgun))
- Racing Stripes (2006 NTV edition) (Scuzz (David Spade))
- Restless (Hiroshi (Ryo Kase))
- The Ridiculous 6 (Pete "Lil Pete" Stockburn (Taylor Lautner))
- Rogue (Simon (Stephen Curry))
- The Roundup (Jang Yi-soo (Park Ji-hwan))
- The Roundup: Punishment (Jang Yi-soo (Park Ji-hwan))
- Scary Movie (Shorty Meeks (Marlon Wayans))
- Scary Movie (2026) (Shorty Meeks (Marlon Wayans))
- The Smurfs (Jokey Smurf (Paul Reubens))
- The Smurfs 2 (Jokey Smurf (Paul Reubens))
- Squid Game (Ali Abdul (Anupam Tripathi))
- Strays (Bubsy (Phil Morris))
- Suicide Squad (Chato Santana / El Diablo (Jay Hernandez))
- The Suicide Squad (Calendar Man (Sean Gunn))
- Texas Chainsaw Massacre (Dante Spivey (Jacob Latimore))
- Three Billboards Outside Ebbing, Missouri (Red Welby (Caleb Landry Jones))
- Transformers: Dark of the Moon (Igor (Greg Berg))
- Transformers: The Last Knight (Mohawk (Reno Wilson))
- True Detective (Roland West (Stephen Dorff))
- Unfriended (Adam (Will Peltz))
- Unleashed (Lefty (Dylan Brown))
- The Watch (Jamarcus (Richard Ayoade))
- Whiteout (Russell Haden (Alex O'Loughlin))

==== Animation ====
- Arcane (Silco)
- Cloudy with a Chance of Meatballs 2 (Chicken Brent)
- The Croods (Thunk)
- The Croods: A New Age (Thunk)
- Hazbin Hotel (Alastor)
- Home Movies (Jason Penopolis)
- Kung Fu Panda 3 (Po)
- Kung Fu Panda 4 (Po)
- Monster Hunter: Legends of the Guild (Nox)
- Open Season 3 (Alistair)
- Ozzy (Ozzy)
- The Queen's Corgi (Jack)
- Rango (Elbows)
- Sausage Party (The Druggie)
- Smallfoot (Fleem)
- South Park (Season 8 onwards) (Kenny McCormick, Mr. Garrison, Stephen Stotch)
- Spider-Man: Across the Spider-Verse (Pavitr Prabhakar / Spider-Man India)
- Storks (Dougland)
- Surf's Up 2: WaveMania (Chicken Joe)
- Transformers One (Starscream)
- Trolls Band Together (Guy Diamond)
- Turbo (Tito Lopez)
