= Naruto: Shippuden season 9 =

Naruto: Shippuden
- Season 9
- Season 9 Cover
- No. of episodes: 21

Release
- Original network: TV Tokyo
- Original release: September 2, 2010 – January 27, 2011

Season chronology
- ← Previous; Season 8 Next → Season 10

The episodes for the ninth season of the anime series Naruto: Shippuden are based on Part II for Masashi Kishimoto's manga series. The anime only season aired from September 2010 to January 2011, and contains past flashback episodes for Naruto Uzumaki and his friends and ending with the final past flashback episode for Sasuke Uchiha. The season is referred to by its DVDs as Past Arc: The Locus of Konoha (過去篇～木ノ葉の軌跡～, Kako Hen: Konoha no Kiseki) with the first volume released on April 6, 2011, by Aniplex.

The English dub of the season aired on Neon Alley from March 30 to July 6, 2013. The season would make its English television debut on Adult Swim's Toonami programming block and premiere from October 8, 2017, to March 25, 2018.

The season contains five musical themes: two openings and three endings. The opening themes are "Tōmei Datta Sekai" (透明だった世界; "Formerly Transparent World") by Motohiro Hata (used for only the first four episodes of the season) and "Diver" by Nico Touches the Walls (used for episodes 180 to 196). The ending themes are "Utakata Hanabi" (うたかた花火; "Transient Fireworks") by Supercell (used for only the first four episodes of the season), "U Can Do It!" by Domino (used for episodes 180 to 192) and "Mayonaka no Orchestra" (真夜中のオーケストラ, Mayonaka Ōkesutora; "Midnight Orchestra") by Aqua Timez (used for the remaining episodes). This is the only season to have additional music material by the original series composer, Toshio Masuda.

== Episodes ==
No. overall	No. in season	Title	Directed by	Written by	Original release date	English air date
Past Arc: The Locus of Konoha
176	1	"Rookie Instructor Iruka"; Transliteration: "Shinmai Kyōshi Iruka" (Japanese: 新米教師イルカ)	Kiyomu Fukuda	Shin Yoshida	September 2, 2010	March 30, 2013
Iruka has just become Naruto Uzumaki's Academy homeroom teacher. Another teacher advises Iruka to not mistreat his students so that they will not cause trouble. But Naruto still causes mischief, as he is pained by his teacher's words to his class bullies to leave him alone and just ignore him. Lastly, Naruto discovers that Sasuke Uchiha is the only survivor of the Uchiha clan.
177	2	"Iruka's Ordeal"; Transliteration: "Iruka no Shiren" (Japanese: イルカの試練)	Naoki Horiuchi	Shin Yoshida	September 9, 2010	April 6, 2013
Upset after being rejected by a group of students, Naruto dresses up as a spirit to scare them, only to be scolded by Iruka later. Naruto gets angry and claims he will never return to the Academy again, running away from a very confused Iruka. Afterward, Naruto is tricked into going into the forest to retrieve a souvenir from a recent battle by the kids he scared. In return, they falsely promise to accept him into their group, hoping Naruto will be killed by the enemy still lurking out there.
178	3	"Iruka's Decision"; Transliteration: "Iruka no Ketsui" (Japanese: イルカの決意)	Atsushi Nigorikawa	Shin Yoshida	September 16, 2010	April 6, 2013
Naruto runs into three female ninja from the Hidden Waterfall Village that want information on the Leaf Village's border patrol that Naruto had discovered earlier on. The ninja chase after Naruto and encounter Iruka. Iruka tries to protect Naruto as best he can, but is rescued by Kakashi Hatake. Iruka reconciles with Naruto. Back in the present Leaf Village, Yamato is informed by Shikaku that Naruto had defeated Pain. An ANBU member then tells Shikaku that he is expected at a very important meeting.
179	4	"Kakashi Hatake, The Jonin in Charge"; Transliteration: "Tantō Jōnin Hatake Kakashi" (Japanese: 担当上忍はたけカカシ)	Hiroshi Kimura	Junki Takegami	September 30, 2010	April 6, 2013
Watching Naruto and Sakura Haruno help out in the effort to rebuild their home, Kakashi has a flashback of when Hiruzen briefed him that he would be assigned them and Sasuke, accompanying him to Naruto's apartment where they find the long-expired milk which the boy drank before meeting up with his classmates on their last day of Ninja Academy and team assignments. Kakashi observes Team 7 from the behind the scenes, from Naruto's attempt to get close to Sakura to being outmatched by Sasuke when he attempted to attack him for hurting Sakura's feelings. It then goes back to the present as Kakashi notes that taking down the now Rogue Ninja Sasuke is his task to bear.
180	5	"Inari's Courage Put to the Test"; Transliteration: "Inari, Tamesareru Yūki" (Japanese: イナリ、試される勇気)	Gorou Sessha	Yuka Miyata	October 7, 2010	April 6, 2013
Years ago, after Team 7 completed their first mission and bid good bye to Tazuna and his grandson Inari, Naruto runs back to pick up a ramen coupon he left behind with Sasuke chasing after him. Meanwhile, Inari finds the coupon and runs off to find Naruto before he runs into bullies as they are all captured by Gatō's subordinates who intend to renew their criminal empire once the ninja have left. The boys are able to escape from the hideout, but the kidnappers follow with Inari luring them away so the boys can reach the village. Luckily, Naruto and Sasuke find signs of the struggle and save Inari at the last second while Gatō's subordinates were all captured, though Inari lost the coupon during the chaos. In the present following Nagato's defeat, Naruto and Sakura see Tazuna and an older Inari as they and Inari's former bullies are aiding in the rebuilding the Hidden Leaf Village.
181	6	"Naruto's School of Revenge"; Transliteration: "Naruto, Adauchi Shinanjuku" (Japanese: ナルト、仇討ち指南塾)	Shuu Watanabe	Yasuyuki Suzuki	October 14, 2010	April 13, 2013
In a flashback of Naruto and Sakura's, Team 7 is on a mission to take an ostrich called Mr. Ostrich to his home. They arrive at a village where they see a swordsman named Tsukado who has a vendetta to carry on a man named Katazu who killed his distant relative Shikazo. Tsukado fails to defeat him so Naruto decides to teach him unusual revenge lessons. Katazu has then took his brother's identity and attracted Shikazo's pursuers while Kageki and his family went into hiding. Tsukado decides not to kill him and ends their years of fighting though Kanabun wants them to keep fighting. The swordsmen, Team 7 and Mr. Ostrich chase the Kanabun Gang out of town.
182	7	"Gaara's Bond"; Transliteration: "Gaara 'Kizuna'" (Japanese: 我愛羅『絆』)	Kanryou Kishikawa	Masahiro Hikokubo	October 21, 2010	April 13, 2013
After hearing the news about Akatsuki's attack on the Hidden Leaf Village, Gaara worries about Naruto's well-being. He remembers a time in the past where he and two Sand Ninja meet up Team 7 to deal with bandits as part of an alliance between their villages, though Naruto and the others were not eager to trust Gaara. But when Gaara is revealed to be targeted by those in the Hidden Sand who still consider him a threat as a Jinchuriki despite his change of outlook, Naruto was the first to aid him with Gaara's teammates following.
183	8	"Naruto: Outbreak"; Transliteration: "Naruto Autobureiku" (Japanese: ナルト・アウトブレイク)	Maki Odaira	Daisuke Watanabe	October 28, 2010	April 13, 2013
Chōji says to Sakura that "Fools never catch a cold", which leads Sakura to have a flashback of being sneezed on by Naruto during Tsunade's first days as Hokage. When Sakura sees Tsunade at her office, she collapses to which Tsunade claims Sakura has an illness known as a chakra virus. It was an illness long ago in another village that would turn chakra into a terrible flu and Naruto recently went to that village for a mission. Tsunade, not wanting to cause a panic, orders Shizune and a team of medical ninja to capture Naruto and later recruits Choji, Kiba and Shino to assist. Tsunade eventually captures Naruto when he attempted to hide in Sasuke's hospital room, only for it be revealed that Naruto did not really have the chakra virus and only sneezed due to pepper he had in his pocket with Sakura having an allergic reaction. Following Naruto's release as he demands an apology from Tsunade, she refuses of admit her mistake by claiming the events as an "emergency drill".
184	9	"Deploy! Team Tenten"; Transliteration: "Shutsugeki! Tenten-han" (Japanese: 出撃! テンテン班)	Shigeru Mita	Katsuhiko Chiba	November 4, 2010	April 13, 2013
Tenten and Neji Hyūga arrive at a Konoha Tool Research Lab for more tools due to the weakened military power after Pain's invasion. Might Guy has Naruto join Team Guy on a mission with Rock Lee in the hospital. For the mission, Guy assigns Tenten as captain of the team. Team Tenten arrives at the lab and ask the tool maker, Iou for more tools. They all run outside to see two ninja named Gameru and Kusune who demand more tools from Iou who refuses. Naruto and Neji decide to fight them and Gameru and Kusane summon two prototype tools of Iou's, Dako and Tsuru-Kame. Iou's apprentice, Shoseki confesses that he sold them the tools. With Naruto and Neji struggling with the two ninja, Iou has Tenten use his latest invention, Jidanda.
185	10	"Animal District"; Transliteration: "Animaru Bangaichi" (Japanese: アニマル番外地)	Kiyomu Fukuda	Katsuhiko Chiba	November 11, 2010	April 20, 2013
Condor, an ostrich previously captured by Team 7, remembers being caught with three other animals by Kotetsu, Rock Lee, Naruto and Shino in the "Ground 0" of the Forest of Death, which became a prohibited nature reserve. After locating the ostrich, Shino tries to capture it but his insects are eaten by carnivorous plants. Condor then runs away, whilst pursued by Rock Lee who is attacked by a kangaroo boxer. Condor then turns back and attacks Naruto and Kotetsu using Taijutsu. The team retreats after taking into account the intelligence and ninja capabilities of the animals. Condor then attacks with two new companions: an anteater and a baby kangaroo boxing from his pocket, forming the "four ninja animals." And as Kotetsu is about to be killed, Izumo arrives and saves him. The Leaf Ninja are finally able to overwhelm the animals.
186	11	"Ah, the Medicine of Youth"; Transliteration: "Aa, Seishun no Kanpōgan" (Japanese: ああ、青春の漢方丸)	Masaaki Kumagai	Daisuke Watanabe	November 18, 2010	April 27, 2013
Back before Rock Lee had his surgery, Naruto, after donning the suit given to him by Guy, set out on a mission with Sakura and Ino to obtain a special flower which was a necessary ingredient for Lee's medicine. When Naruto picked one of the flowers, however, he had to face a strange technique that had taken on the form of Gaara.
187	12	"Gutsy Master and Student: The Training"; Transliteration: "Dokonjō Shitei Shugyōhen" (Japanese: ド根性師弟修業編)	Atsushi Nigorikawa	Junki Takegami	November 25, 2010	May 4, 2013
During the 3 year time period in which Naruto was training under Jiraiya, the latter decided that it was time for Naruto to learn how to repel genjutsu. During this training session, the two traveled to a village which Jiraiya had previously been associated with, but they discovered that something dark was amiss.
188	13	"Record of the Ninja Gutsy Master and Student"; Transliteration: "Dokonjō Shitei Ninpūroku" (Japanese: ド根性師弟忍風録)	Naoki Horiuchi	Junki Takegami	November 25, 2010	May 11, 2013
After having discovered that the village was under the control of rebels from the Hidden Rain Village, led by Hanzo's right hand man, Naruto and Jiraiya decided to take action to help save the women and children taken hostage and free the village from the Rain's tyrannical control.
189	14	"Sasuke's Paw Encyclopedia"; Transliteration: "Sasuke no Nikukyū Taizen" (Japanese: サスケの肉球大全)	Hiroshi Kimura	Masahiro Hikokubo	December 2, 2010	May 18, 2013
Granny Cat requests that Sasuke and Team 7 collect the last cat paw print necessary to complete the "Paw Encyclopedia."
190	15	"Naruto and the Old Soldier"; Transliteration: "Naruto to Rōhei" (Japanese: ナルトと老兵)	Maki Odaira	Katsuhiko Chiba	December 9, 2010	May 25, 2013
Naruto, two jonin and an elder known as "the Eternal Genin" set off to a mission to patrol the border of the Land of Fire following Orochimaru's attack. After some days with no incidents, a group of enemy ninjas cross the borders. The Eternal Genin proves to be a brave ninja and remembering the lessons he learned with the Second and Third Hokages, sees the similarities between Naruto and his father.
191	16	"Kakashi Love Song"; Transliteration: "Kakashi Koiuta" (Japanese: カカシ恋歌)	Shuu Watanabe	Yasuyuki Suzuki	December 16, 2010	June 1, 2013
A spy, Hanare, from the Hidden Lock Village (Land of Key) is caught by ANBU pretending to be a musician. She is interrogated. However, the interrogation proves unsuccessful. Slowly, her past is revealed and so is her relationship with Kakashi. Team 7 spy on the two as they go around town, under the impression that the two are dating. After The Lock Village keeps a Leaf Village ninja hostage, they exchange Hanare for the ninja. It is then revealed that Hanare has a special ability, causing a large chase to occur. In the end, Kakashi lets Hanare free. The musician seen at the beginning entertaining Leaf Ninja reminds Kakashi of Hanare which prompts the flashback.
192	17	"Neji Chronicles"; Transliteration: "Neji Gaiden" (Japanese: ネジ外伝)	Kanryou Kishikawa	Yuka Miyata	December 23, 2010	June 8, 2013
Konohamaru's team asks Neji to talk about Naruto's heroism. Instead, Neji tells them about an incident during the Chunin exams three years prior. While Orochimaru attacked Hidden Leaf Village, two Rogue Ninja take advantage of the commotion and kidnap Hinata. Neji, Tenten, Kiba and Akamaru rush out to save her. They're in trouble until Hiashi shows up and saves them, telling Neji that he's the beloved memory of Hiashi's younger brother. Neji realizes Naruto's speech about destiny was right; he isn't just a slave to the clan name. Konohamaru's team complains that Naruto wasn't in the story at all and Neji cryptically answers that Naruto was the most important part.
193	18	"The Man Who Died Twice"; Transliteration: "Nido Shinda Otoko" (Japanese: 二度死んだ男)	Chiyuki Tanaka	Shin Yoshida	January 6, 2011	June 15, 2013
Naruto finds a photo of a spirit he met in his younger years of being a genin. While on his way home, Naruto had come across a tag labeled "Kisuke" stuck to a rock, which he tears off without thinking. That night, Naruto is surprised to find a ghost standing near his bed. He doesn't know how he got there. When they uncover his past, Kisuke talks about a spy in the village that could be helping outside forces to attack the Hidden Leaf Village. Naruto helps Kisuke to tell the truth about the spy within the village.
194	19	"The Worst Three-Legged Race"; Transliteration: "Saiaku no Nininsankyaku" (Japanese: 最悪の二人三脚)	Gorou Sessha	Yasuyuki Suzuki	January 13, 2011	June 22, 2013
Naruto and Sakura remember a time when they were on a mission to retrieve a stolen treasure from thieves as Team 7. One of the thieves uses a web-like jutsu which results in Naruto and Sasuke to be stuck together during their escape while Sakura gets captured. Naruto and Sasuke decide to rescue Sakura, but have problems working together. They eventually manage to defeat the thieves and retrieve the treasure by working together even without having the ability to perform seals with their hands.
195	20	"Team 10's Teamwork"; Transliteration: "Renkei, Daijuppan" (Japanese: 連携、第十班)	Hiroyuki Tsuchiya	Masahiro Hikokubo	January 20, 2011	June 29, 2013
Shikamaru has a flashback of when Team 10 was working with Team 7 to save a hostage taken by bandits, who were wreaking havok in a village. They proceed to the bandits' hideout with the help of Tofu, an ex-bandit member. However, Tofu gets captured and turns out to be really working for Baji, the bandits' leader. The genins successfully bypass the bandits' fortress, and Shikamaru agrees to exchange himself for Tofu. But Shikamaru finds that he is unable to communicate his plan to the rest of the team as his voice gets muted by Baji.
196	21	"Drive Towards Darkness"; Transliteration: "Yami e no Shissō" (Japanese: 闇への疾走)	Hiroshi Kimura	Daisuke Watanabe	January 27, 2011	July 6, 2013
Sasuke has a flashback while traveling to Hidden Leaf Village with his team, Taka. He once saved a girl named Naho not knowing that she's a relative of the Feudal Lord. Meanwhile, Naruto and Sakura are sent on a mission to accompany Naho and act as her bodyguards while Kakashi and Sasuke are sent to discover the reason why internationally wanted bandits have entered their border. Kakashi and Sasuke later find out that the bandits intend to abduct Naho. Naruto and Sakura are defeated by the bandits and are taken hostage. Sasuke finds them first and proceeds to defeat the leader and mercilessly punches him because of his jealousy for Naruto's growing power, making Naho became scared. A cut to the present reveals Naruto contemplating on his promise to have Sasuke return to the village.

== Home media release ==
=== Japanese ===
Volume	Date	Discs	Episodes	Reference
1	April 6, 2011	1	176–179	
2	May 11, 2011	1	180–183	
3	June 1, 2011	1	184–189	
4	July 6, 2011	1	190–193	
5	August 3, 2011	1	194–196	

=== English ===
Viz Media (North America, Region 1)
Box set	Date	Discs	Episodes	Reference
14	April 23, 2013	3	167–179	
15	July 16, 2013	3	180–192	
16	October 8, 2013	2	193–205	

Viz Media (North America, Region 1 Blu-ray sets)
Volume	Date	Discs	Episodes	Ref.
7	July 15, 2025	4	166–192	
8	October 28, 2025	4	193–220	

Manga Entertainment (United Kingdom, Region 2)
Volume	Date	Discs	Episodes	Reference
14	September 23, 2013	2	167–179	
15	December 9, 2013	2	180–192	
16	February 24, 2014	2	193–205	

Madman Entertainment (Australia/New Zealand, Region 4)
Collection	Date	Discs	Episodes	Reference
14	June 19, 2013	2	167–179	
15	October 16, 2013	2	180–192	
16	February 19, 2014	2	193–205	
