= Kite (film series) =

Series of OVA anime films

Kite is a series of films created by Yasuomi Umetsu. It was started in 1998 with the release of Kite. It was followed by a 2008 sequel Kite Liberator. The first film of the series was adapted into a live-action film of the same name and was released in 2014. The music video Ex-Girlfriend was adapted from several scenes of the first film. The latest installment Kite Armageddon is not yet produced. The North American version is currently being distributed by Media Blasters for home video releases. The film series includes characters depicting ephebophilic scenes, which was only found in the first film.

== Films ==
- Kite (1998)
- Kite Liberator (2008)
