= Naruto: Shippuden season 8 =

Naruto: Shippuden
- Season 8
- Season 8 Cover
- No. of episodes: 24

Release
- Original network: TV Tokyo
- Original release: March 25 – August 26, 2010

Season chronology
- ← Previous; Season 7 Next → Season 9

The eighth season of the Naruto: Shippuden anime series is directed by Hayato Date, and produced by Pierrot and TV Tokyo. The eighth season aired from March to August 2010. The season follows the Akatsuki Leader Pain invading the Leaf Village and attempting to kidnap Naruto Uzumaki while Naruto tries to avenge his master Jiraiya's death as he trains with Fukasaku in the Mount Myoboku to learn the Sage Jutsu. It is referred to by its DVDs as the chapter of Two Saviors (二人の救世主, Futari no Kyūseishu). Aniplex released the six volumes between October 7, 2010, and March 2, 2011. While the volumes contains all the episodes, episodes 170 and 171 were skipped to the sixth volume. Starting with episode 154, it is switched and produced in high-definition instead of 16:9 widescreen, like the previous five seasons, for the rest of the series.

The English dub of this season premiered on February 16 on Neon Alley and concluded on March 30, 2013. The season would make its English television debut on Adult Swim's Toonami programming block and premiere from April 2 to October 1, 2017.

The season contains five musical themes: two openings and three ending themes. The opening themes are "Sign" by Flow (used for the first two episodes of the season) and "Tōmei Datta Sekai" (透明だった世界; "Formerly Transparent World") by Motohiro Hata (used for episodes 154 to 175). The ending themes are "For You" by Azu (used for the first two episodes of the season), "Jitensha" (自転車; "Bicycle") by OreSkaBand (used for episodes 154 to 166) and "Utakata Hanabi" (うたかた花火; "Transient Fireworks") by Supercell (used for episodes 167 to 175). The fourth feature film, Naruto Shippuden The Movie: The Lost Tower was released on July 31, 2010. The broadcast versions of episodes 172 to 175 include scenes from the film in the opening themes, while still retaining the music "Tōmei Datta Sekai".

== Episodes ==
No. overall	No. in season	Title	Directed by	Written by	Original release date	English air date
Two Saviors
152	1	"Somber News"; Transliteration: "Hihō" (Japanese: 悲報)	Naoki Horiuchi	Yuka Miyata	March 25, 2010	February 16, 2013
After extracting the Six Tails from Utakata, the Akatsuki note that only two Jinchuriki remain to be captured as Sasuke Uchiha hands the unconscious Killer Bee over to Tobi. Meanwhile, the Fourth Raikage Ay learns of Taka's action and is livid that they stole his brother. At the Hidden Leaf Village, after recalling his encounter with Itachi prior to his battle with Sasuke, Naruto Uzumaki is informed by Tsunade and Fukasaku that Jiraiya was killed by Pain.
153	2	"Following the Master's Shadow"; Transliteration: "Shi no Kage o Otte" (Japanese: 師の影を追って)	Masaaki Kumagai	Yuka Miyata	March 25, 2010	February 23, 2013
Naruto, complety heart-broken about learning Jiraiya's death by Pain, walks off and recalls his time with his mentor. Fukasaku shows Jiraiya's chakra-encrypted code to Tsunade who has Shikamaru give to their village's best code breaker in translation. The next day, told that the cipher might be known by something Jiraiya knows, Shikamaru visits Naruto and gives him some peace of mind by revealing that Kurenai is pregnant with Asuma's child and that they should stop being children and become the best of what their mentors saw in them.
154	3	"Decryption"; Transliteration: "Angō Kaidoku" (Japanese: 暗号解読)	Shigeharu Takahashi	Shin Yoshida	April 8, 2010	February 23, 2013
The scientists inspect the body of Pain's Animal Path, while Naruto and Shikamaru identify the message. Naruto, noticing the number nine emulated for the "Ta" katakana on the "Make-Out Tactics" Book, informs Tsunade and Fukasaku that the number code unveils the sentence saying, "The real one is not there". Naruto vows to avenge his master's death and Fukasaku memorizing Jiraiya's actions decides to take Naruto to Mount Myoboku for training in Sage Mode. There, meeting Gamakichi who tries to help him understand Fukasaku's lecture, Naruto learns the basics of Sage Jutsu and the risk of death.
155	4	"The First Challenge"; Transliteration: "Daiichi no Kadai" (Japanese: 第一の課題)	Hiroshi Kimura	Shin Yoshida	April 8, 2010	February 23, 2013
Learning that Jiraiya did not perfect his Sage Jutsu, Naruto learns that taking in too much Natural Energy can cause him to turn into a toad and then into stone. Fukasaku has Naruto beginning his training by using "toad oil" to help him gather energy, whacking him and his clones with a special club to prevent them from becoming toads. Fukasaku later gives Naruto Jiraiya's first book, Tales of Gutsy Ninja to read. Meanwhile, as Tobi and the other Akatsuki members discover that the "Killer Bee" in their possession is actually a fragment of the Eight Tails, Pain and Konan head out to the Hidden Leaf Village to capture the Nine-Tails.
156	5	"Surpassing the Master"; Transliteration: "Shi o Koeru Toki" (Japanese: 師を超えるとき)	Yuki Kinoshita	Yuka Miyata	April 15, 2010	February 23, 2013
After intense training, Naruto successfully gathers energy to master Sage Mode for the first time and surpass Jiraiya. Fukasaku teaches Naruto with Frog Kumite, a senjutsu-enhanced taijutsu that increases the range for physical attacks. Meanwhile, the Raikage Ay orders Samui, Karui and Omoi to find Bee and deliver the letter for Tsunade about capturing Sasuke.
157	6	"Assault on the Leaf Village!"; Transliteration: "Konoha Shūgeki!" (Japanese: 木ノ葉襲撃!)	Hideyuki Yoshida	Masahiro Hikokubo	April 22, 2010	March 2, 2013
While Naruto finishes training on Mount Myoboku, Pain invades the Hidden Leaf Village with his new Animal Path Pain. While Inoichi reads the Animal Path's mind and Shizune leads a biopsy team to find secrets behind the metal piercings for the Leaf's Intel Division, Pain interrogates the villagers. Knowing that Pain is attacking the village, Tsunade orders them to get Naruto back.
158	7	"Power to Believe"; Transliteration: "Shinjiru Chikara" (Japanese: 信じる力)	Kiyomu Fukuda	Shin Yoshida	April 29, 2010	March 2, 2013
Danzo, Homura and Koharu ask Tsunade to cancel Naruto's return, but she convinces them to let Naruto come for Pain and Konan. As Tsunade protecting them failed, Danzo kills the messenger frog from getting to Naruto. Kakashi Hatake meets to confront Pain, allowing Iruka's escape.
159	8	"Pain vs. Kakashi"; Transliteration: "Pein vs Kakashi" (Japanese: ペインvsカカシ)	Yoshihiro Sugai	Yuka Miyata	May 6, 2010	March 2, 2013
Kakashi is stopped by Pain's Asura Path from helping Choza as he and Choji are outmatched against Pain. While Pain annihilates Choza's squad as his Asura Path attacks Kakashi, Choji escapes and get to Tsunade. Kakashi exhausts all his chakra and then dies after helping Choji escape after using Kamui.
160	9	"Mystery of Pain"; Transliteration: "Pein no Nazo" (Japanese: ペインの謎)	Naoki Horiuchi	Yasuyuki Suzuki	May 13, 2010	March 2, 2013
Naruto attempts to merge with Fukasaku, so that he can move in Sage Mode while Fukasaku gathers Nature Energy for him. But the Nine-Tails forces them to find an alternate method for Naruto to enter Sage Mode in battle. As the Interrogation Corp fights off Pain's new Animal Path and barrages them with an assortments of animal summonings, Ibiki fails to stop them.
161	10	"Surname Is Sarutobi. Given Name, Konohamaru!"; Transliteration: "Sei wa Sarutobi, Na wa Konohamaru!" (Japanese: 姓は猿飛、名は木ノ葉丸!)	Shigeharu Takahashi	Masahiro Hikokubo	May 20, 2010	March 9, 2013
Pain's Naraka Path displays its mysterious power against two leaf shinobi while Konohamaru Sarutobi watches in horror. Pain senses Konohamaru's presence but is interrupted by Ebisu who takes on Pain in order to allow Konohamaru to escape. After seeing Ebisu about to be killed, Konohamaru intervenes and after learning of Naraka's ability, judging souls and then reaping the sinner of their life, with a Shadow Clone, he unleashes the Rasengan and is able to keep Naraka at bay.
162	11	"Pain to the World"; Transliteration: "Sekai ni Itami o" (Japanese: 世界に痛みを)	Masaaki Kumagai	Shin Yoshida	May 27, 2010	March 9, 2013
As the Inuzuka and Aburame clans battle with his Preta Path and Konan respectively, Pain meets with Tsunade, who recognizes him as Yahiko. As Naruto learns of the village's situation, Human Path discovers his location and then kills Shizune, transmitting the intel to Pain who uses his gravity-manipulating Deva Path ability to completely destroy the Hidden Leaf Village in frustration with Tsunade. In the newly formed crater in the heart of the Leaf, Naruto appears in Sage Mode with a small armada of toads following Sakura Haruno's cries for his return.
163	12	"Explode! Sage Mode"; Transliteration: "Bakuhatsu! Sennin Mōdo" (Japanese: 爆発! 仙人モード)	Yuki Kinoshita	Masahiro Hikokubo	June 3, 2010	March 9, 2013
Naruto confronts Pain as his other Five Paths reappear. Asura Path attacks Tsunade and Naruto destroys it, telling Tsunade to leave. She does so and reverts to her old self with Sakura. Naruto charges forward as the toads deal with Animal Path's summons. Naruto fights Preta Path with Frog Kumite and defeats it before speaking to Pain. He reveals that they were both Jiraiya's apprentices and how he only wants peace. Angered with his hypocrisy, Naruto throws a finally completed Rasen-Shuriken at the remaining Paths of Pain.
164	13	"Danger! Sage Mode Limit Reached"; Transliteration: "Pinchi! Kieta Sennin Mōdo" (Japanese: 危機! 消えた仙人モード)	Yasuhiro Minami	Shin Yoshida	June 10, 2010	March 9, 2013
Naruto successfully begins taking out Pain's bodies one after another, but when his Sage Mode reaches its limit, Pain attempts to take control of the battle. Naruto throws another Rasen-Shuriken but it is absorbed by a revived Preta Path. But Fukasaku reminds Naruto that Naruto created two clones that are harvesting Natural Energy for him. Fukasaku summoned one of the clones and Naruto disperses it and obtained the energy to resume Sage Mode. Naruto manages to kill the Naraka Path, just to get repelled by the Deva Path's recovering Almighty Push jutsu on the toads. Naruto realizes he cannot use taijutsu or ninjutsu on the remaining paths, so he will have to fight them using a genjutsu suggested by Fukasaku.
165	14	"Nine-Tails, Captured!"; Transliteration: "Kyūbi Hokaku Kanryō" (Japanese: 九尾捕獲完了)	Hiroshi Kimura	Shin Yoshida	June 17, 2010	March 16, 2013
As Hinata worries about Naruto, Inoichi and the others try to find the real Pain. Naruto continues to fight back the remaining paths but is captured by Preta Path. It absorbs his Sage Mode chakra and is petrified due to the uncontrollable Nature Energy. Fukasaku then attempts to trap Pain in a Genjutsu, but is killed. Pain then impales several Chakra receivers into Naruto's body, immobilizing him to be manipulated by Nagato. Pain explains that the world peace Jiraiya envisioned can not be achieved due to hatred among the people, revealing his intent to use the tailed beasts' power to have every living know suffering and fear it. As he does, Pain ask Naruto if he could think of another path to peace, Nagato states that his ideal peace is almost in fruition.
166	15	"Confessions"; Transliteration: "Kokuhaku" (Japanese: 告白)	Toshiyuki Tsuru	Toshiyuki Tsuru	June 24, 2010	March 16, 2013
Hinata decides to come to Naruto's aid as he was about to be manipulated by Pain's Chakra receivers, finally admitting her love for Naruto as she fights a losing battle against Pain. But despite knowing she may likely die, Hinata remains adamant before she is quickly defeated, stabbed by Pain, and is seemingly unconscious. As Pain explains that the hate from losing loved ones is why there can never be peace in the current world, Naruto goes berserk when the Nine-Tails chakra begins to surface. Meanwhile, the Leaf Ninjas start the search for Nagato.
167	16	"Planetary Devastation"; Transliteration: "Chibaku Tensei" (Japanese: 地爆天星)	Atsushi Wakabayashi	Yuka Miyata	July 1, 2010	March 16, 2013
Naruto enters his Four-Tailed Fox form and attacks Pain, who manages to repel his attacks. Angered even further when Pain mentions Sasuke, Naruto continues his transformation into a Six-Tailed Fox form to gain advantage. Pain decides to fall back from the village ruined toward where Nagato is to trap Naruto with Planetary Devastation, a powerful jutsu that the Sage of Six Paths used to create the moon, to trap the Nine-Tails Jinchuriki within a miniature moon in midair. But Naruto starts breaking free to Pain's big shock, now in a monstrous Eight-Tailed Fox form, he launches a powerful wind roar against Pain sending to a rock and injuring him. Within his mind, Naruto succumbs to the Nine-Tails telling him to embrace his hate and destroy everything. Naruto was about to remove the seal to completely release the Nine-Tails when he was stopped by the Fourth Hokage Minato Namikaze.
168	17	"The Fourth Hokage"; Transliteration: "Yondaime Hokage" (Japanese: 四代目火影)	Kiyomu Fukuda	Masahiro Hikokubo	July 15, 2010	March 16, 2013
Minato appears within Naruto's psyche, revealing himself to a chakra imprint of the Fourth Hokage as he takes Naruto to another part of his mind to discuss things away from the furious Nine-Tails. It was there that Minato revealed himself as Naruto's real father, making Naruto further conflicted on why his own father made him a Jinchuriki. But then, Minato says that the Nine-Tails' attack on the Hidden Leaf Village 16 years ago was Tobi's doing, theorizing that Pain may be a pawn of the Akatsuki's mysterious masked man to Naruto's big shock. Placing his faith that Naruto will find the answer to Pain's question, Minato restores the Nine-Tails seal before fading away. Back to normal and no means to renew his Sage Mode, Naruto confronts Pain and demands to meet Nagato himself. Pain refuses, resulting in a fight with Naruto stabbing himself with a Chakra Receiver to pinpoint Nagato's location. After using up his final Rasen Shuriken followed by a mass clone attack to force his opponent to exhaust his gravity manipulation, Naruto uses the 5-second window to land a final Rasengan on the Deva Path, the final Six Paths of Pain.
169	18	"The Two Students"; Transliteration: "Futari no Deshi" (Japanese: ふたりの弟子)	Yoshihiro Sugai	Shin Yoshida	July 22, 2010	March 23, 2013
Naruto finally defeats Pain with his final Rasengan, removing his Chakra Receivers before heading to Nagato's location, having Katsuya tell the others not to follow as Sakura finishes healing Hinata. Naruto encounters Inoichi and Shikaku on the way, the latter honoring Naruto's request to stand down to Inoichi's dismay. Naruto finds Nagato and Konan. Naruto states his murderous intent as Konan gets between him and Nagato before the youth stops himself. Naruto states Jiraiya's belief for a peaceful world with Nagato asking if he can still believe in Jiraiya's "peace" after all that has happened. Noticing Nagato and Konan are not like the other Akatsuki members, Naruto requests to hear their real story before giving him his answer.
Big Adventure! The Quest for the Fourth Hokage's Legacy
170	19	"Big Adventure! The Quest for the Fourth Hokage's Legacy – Part 1"; Transliteration: "Daibōken! Yondaime no Isan o Sagase – Zenpen" (Japanese: 大冒険! 四代目の遺産を探せ・前編)	Naoki Horiuchi	Junki Takegami	July 29, 2010	March 23, 2013
Three years before Pain's attack on the Hidden Leaf Village, Naruto trains in preparation for the Chūnin Exam's final rounds when he hears Jiraiya speak of "the Fourth Hokage's legacy". Using information from Guy, Naruto, Sakura and Team 10 head to the Honegami Grounds, where they are instructed by a disguised Guy to enter and complete the obstacle course and obtain the Secret Technique. Meanwhile, The Rain Ninja begin their pursuit.
171	20	"Big Adventure! The Quest for the Fourth Hokage's Legacy – Part 2"; Transliteration: "Daibōken! Yondaime no Isan o Sagase – Kōhen" (Japanese: 大冒険! 四代目の遺産を探せ・後編)	Yuki Kinoshita	Junki Takegami	July 29, 2010	March 23, 2013
Naruto and the others face the oncoming challenges in order to find the Secret Technique and break the Fourth Hokage's record, but Naruto's impulsive action leads the group into various troubles. They are attacked by the Rain Ninja, but unknown to them, are saved by Sasuke. They eventually find the scroll which reads: "There is no shortcut in the Ninja Way". The phrase that becomes Naruto's motto. The story ends as the final rounds of the Chūnin Exam begin the next day.
Two Saviors
172	21	"Meeting"; Transliteration: "Deai" (Japanese: 出逢い)	Takahiro Okao	Shin Yoshida	August 5, 2010	March 23, 2013
Learning that Naruto will answer his question after learning how he and Konan ended up as they are, Nagato recalls his two real moments of pain, the first of which being the night his Rinnegan activated upon seeing his parents were misidentified and were killed by Leaf Ninja. He then tells Naruto about how he met Konan and Yahiko, all three of them having to resort to thievery to stay alive. After seeing Hanzo the Salamander battle the Three Sannin, they set out to find the three ninja so that they can be taught ninjutsu.
173	22	"Origin of Pain"; Transliteration: "Pein Tanjō" (Japanese: ペイン誕生)	Masaaki Kumagai	Masahiro Hikokubo	August 12, 2010	March 30, 2013
Nagato continues talking to Naruto and describes his second pain, how he and Konan helped Yahiko use what they learned from Jiraiya to create the Akatsuki to bring peace to Hidden Rain Village. But Hanzo deemed Yahiko's group a threat to his regime and allied with Danzo to kidnap Konan. Hanzo orders Nagato to kill Yahiko if he wants her to live and Yahiko sacrifices himself for Konan's sake, horrifying Nagato and forcing him into the crippled state and state of mind he is in today.
174	23	"The Tale of Naruto Uzumaki"; Transliteration: "Uzumaki Naruto Monogatari" (Japanese: うずまきナルト物語)	Kanryou Kishikawa	Yasuyuki Suzuki	August 19, 2010	March 30, 2013
With Nagato's real story done, Naruto answers that he still cannot forgive him but will not abandon their sensei's legacy and will keep striving for peace no matter what pain he is put through. Nagato reflects on Naruto's words, thinking back to how inspired the lead character in Jiraiya's story who Naruto was named after. This causes Nagato to decide to put his faith and believe in Naruto as he performs a technique that will kill himself to revive all those that he killed in the Hidden Leaf Village with Konan considering the consequences of its use.
175	24	"Hero of the Leaf"; Transliteration: "Konoha no Eiyū" (Japanese: 木ノ葉の英雄)	Hiroshi Kimura	Yuka Miyata	August 26, 2010	March 30, 2013
Nagato finishes reviving everyone he had killed and dies due to running out all of chakra, but not before he entrusts his dreams and believes to Naruto, and Konan likewise decides to believe in him. After retrieving Nagato and Yahiko's bodies, she gives Naruto a bouquet of flowers symbolizing the hope Naruto represents. After erecting a memorial for Jiraiya, Naruto returns to the ruined village and, after years of pain and isolation, finally is heralded as the Leaf Hero.

== Home media release ==
=== Japanese ===
Volume	Date	Discs	Episodes	Reference
1	October 6, 2010	1	152–155	
2	November 3, 2010	1	156–159	
3	December 1, 2010	1	160–163	
4	January 12, 2011	1	164–167	
5	February 2, 2011	1	168–171	
6	March 2, 2011	1	172–175	

=== English ===
Viz Media (North America, Region 1)
Box set	Date	Discs	Episodes	Reference
12	October 9, 2012	3	141–153	
13	January 29, 2013	3	154–166	
14	April 23, 2013	3	167–179	

Viz Media (North America, Region 1 Blu-ray sets)
Volume	Date	Discs	Episodes	Ref.
6	April 29, 2025	4	138–165	
7	July 15, 2025	4	166–192	

Manga Entertainment (United Kingdom, Region 2)
Volume	Date	Discs	Episodes	Reference
12	March 18, 2013	2	141–153	
13	June 24, 2013	2	154–166	
14	September 23, 2013	2	167–179	

Madman Entertainment (Australia/New Zealand, Region 4)
Collection	Date	Discs	Episodes	Reference
12	January 9, 2013	2	141–153	
13	March 20, 2013	2	154–166	
14	June 19, 2013	2	167–179	
