= Himawari no Yakusoku =

Single by Motohiro Hata
- Released: June 8, 2014
- Length: 5:17
- Songwriter: Motohiro Hata
- Producer: Motohiro Hata

Motohiro Hata singles chronology
"Dialogue Monologue" (2014)	"Himawari no Yakusoku" (2014)

Music video
- "Himawari no Yakusoku" on YouTube

"Himawari no Yakusoku" (ひまわりの約束; lit. 'Promise of Sunflower') is a single released by Motohiro Hata. It was released in two versions: a limited edition available until the end of December 2014 and coming with a Doraemon collaboration jacket and slipcase as well as a mini sticker, and a regular edition whose first press came housed in a slipcase. The title track was used as the theme song for the movie Stand by Me Doraemon (2014). It received a digital download single certification from the Recording Industry Association of Japan for sales of a million.

== Charts ==
=== Weekly charts ===
Chart (2014)	Peak position
Oricon Weekly Singles Chart	10
Billboard Japan Hot 100	2

Oricon Yearly Karaoke	Position
2018	6

=== All-time charts ===
Chart (2008–2022)	Position
Japan (Japan Hot 100)	46
