= Motohiro Hata =

Japanese singer-songwriter (born 1980)

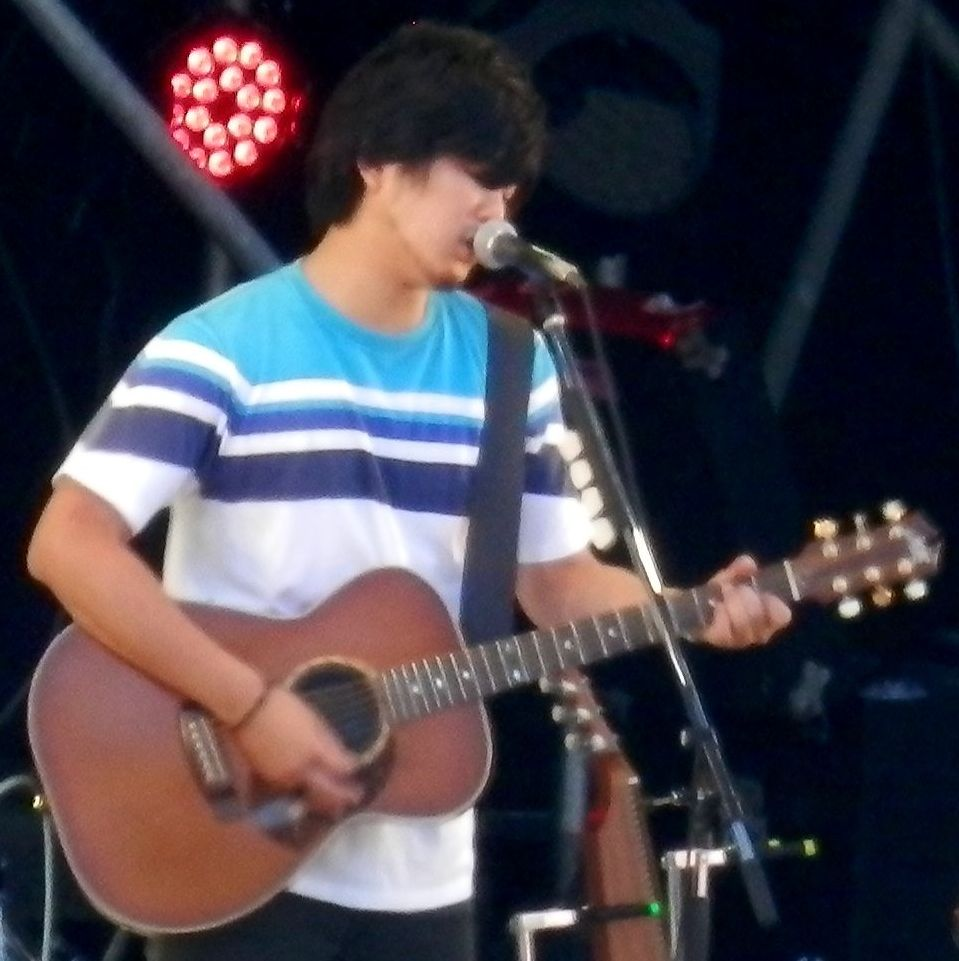

Background information
- Born: Motohiro Hata (秦基博); 11 October 1980 (age 45); Nichinan, Miyazaki, Japan
- Origin: Yokohama, Japan
- Genres: J-Pop; pop rock (early)
- Occupation: Singer-songwriter
- Instrument: Acoustic guitar
- Years active: 2004–present
- Labels: Add Nine Records (2004); Augusta Records (2006–present); BMG Japan (2006–2009); Ariola Japan (2009–2016); Universal Music Japan (2017–present)
- Website: Motohiro Hata Official Web Site

Motohiro Hata (秦基博, Hata Motohiro; born 11 October 1980) is a Japanese singer-songwriter. He debuted under the major label BMG Japan in 2006 with the single "Synchro" (シンクロ, Shinkuro).

== Early life and career ==
Hata is the youngest of three brothers. He moved to Yokohama when he was 2. He began playing the guitar at age 3, after his eldest brother received a cheap guitar from a friend. In junior high school, he began writing songs, and after entering high school started working fully as a musician.

In 1999, he performed at his first big concert at the F.A.D Yokohama live house, after a referral by one of his friends.

In 2004, he released an independent EP, "Orange no Haikei no Akai Seibutsu" (オレンジの背景の赤い静物, Red Object with an Orange Background). In 2006 he was signed to Augusta Records after catching the attention of one of the staff members. He was the opening act of Augusta Camp 2006 in July. He debuted with the single "Synchro" (シンクロ, Shinkuro).

His 2008 single "Kimi, Meguru, Boku" (キミ、メグル、ボク, You, Turn, Me), was his first top 20 hit, reaching No. 15 on Oricon charts. "Kimi, Meguru, Boku" was used as the opening theme for the anime series Itazura na Kiss. Since then, he has had six top 20 singles and two top 10 albums.

In 2010, his song "Tōmei Datta Sekai" premiered as the opening for the seventh season of Naruto: Shippuden.

In 2012 he sang the song "Altair" under the name "Motohiro Hata meets Sakamichi no Apollon" for the ending of the anime Kids on the Slope, which premiered on 12 April 2012.

The song "Goodbye Isaac" was the fourth ending track to the anime Space Brothers.

In 2013, his cover of "Rain" by Senri Oe was featured as the ED for The Garden of Words by Makoto Shinkai.

In 2014, "Himawari no Yakusoku" (ひまわりの約束 Promise of Sunflower) was used as the theme song for the 3D-animated movie Stand by Me Doraemon (STAND BY ME ドラえもん).

== Influences ==
Hata cited Western artists such as Dua Lipa, Sam Smith, and Taylor Swift among his musical influences.

== Discography ==
- Contrast (2007)
- Alright (2008)
- Documentary (2010)
- Signed Pop (2013)
- Ao no Kokei (2015)
- Copernicus (2019)
- Paint Like a Child (2023)

== Awards and nominations ==
Billboard Japan Music Awards
Year	Nominee / work	Award	Result
2014	Motohiro Hata	Artist of the Year	Nominated

CD Shop Awards
Year	Nominee / work	Award	Result
2011	Documentary	Sub Grand Prix	Won

Japan Record Awards
Year	Nominee / work	Award	Result
2014	Evergreen	Planning Award	Won

MTV Video Music Awards Japan
Year	Nominee / work	Award	Result
2008	Motohiro Hata	Best New Artist	Won
2009	"Forever Song"	Best Male Video	Nominated
2016	"Sumire"	Best Male Video	Nominated

Space Shower Music Awards
Year	Nominee / work	Award	Result
2018		Best Male Artist	Nominated
