= Bennett Abara =

American actress

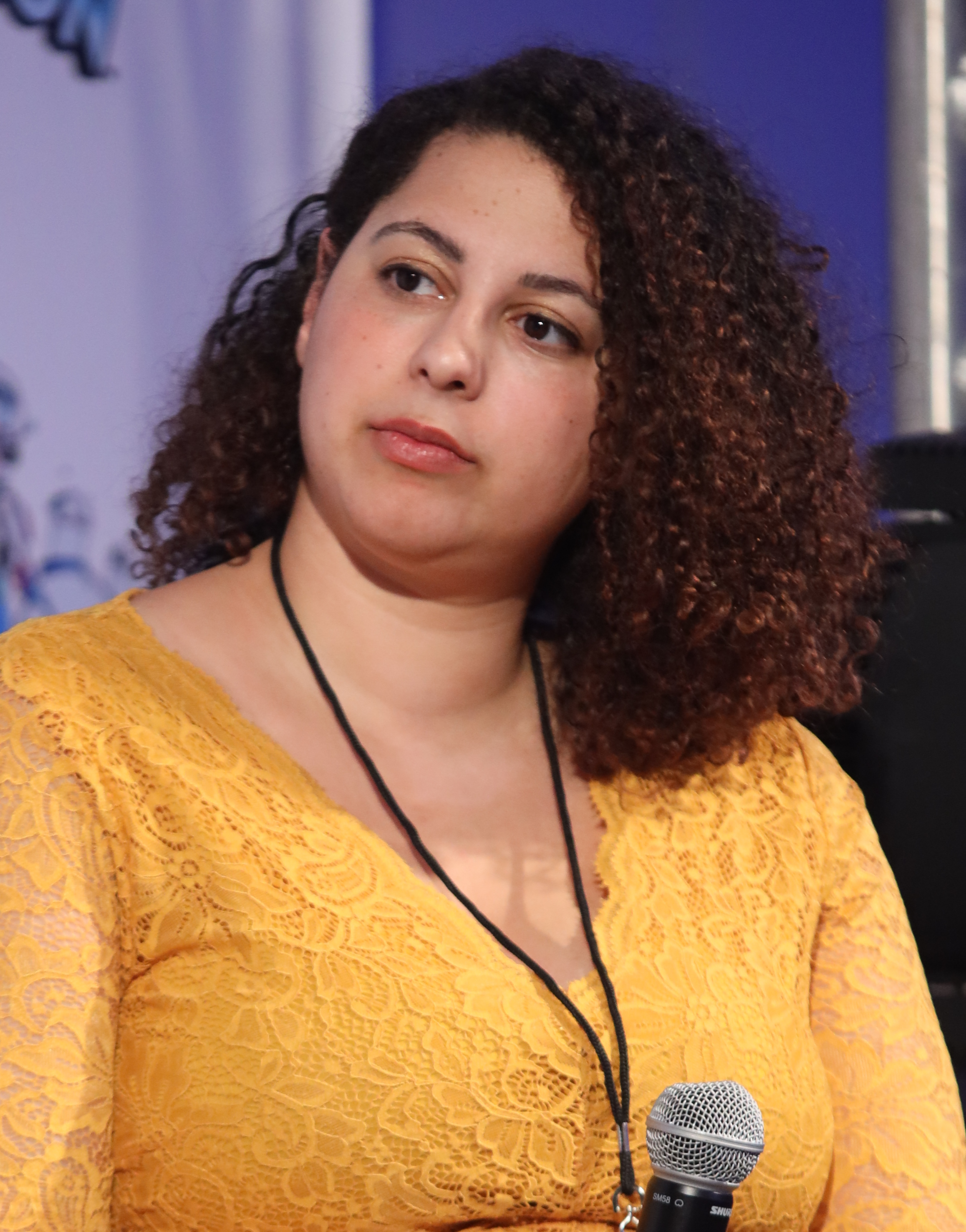
- Abara at GalaxyCon Louisville in 2019
- Other names: Amanda C. Miller; Amanda Miller; Bennett Abara
- Education: University of Maryland
- Occupation: Voice actress
- Years active: 2009–present
- Website: bennettabara.com

Amanda Celine Miller, known professionally as Bennett Abara since 2024, is an American voice actress in audiobooks, commercials, English dubs for anime, animation and video games. Her major roles include Sailor Jupiter in the Sailor Moon franchise, Junko Enoshima and Toko Fukawa in the Danganronpa video game series, Sully and Cherche in Fire Emblem Awakening, Takeru Aizawa in Squid Girl, and Boruto Uzumaki in Boruto: Naruto Next Generations. She was selected as the Breakthrough Actress of the Year by Behind The Voice Actors in their annual Dub Anime Awards for 2014.

== Career ==
Abara voiced Makoto Kino, otherwise known as Sailor Jupiter. Abara cites Sailor Jupiter as her favorite character.

== Filmography ==
=== Anime ===
List of English dubbing performances in anime
Year	Title	Role	Notes	Source
2011	Squid Girl	Takeru Aizawa		
2011	K-On!	Megumi Sokabe, Maki, Satoshi		resume
2012	Blue Exorcist	Yoshikuni		resume
2013	Accel World	Seiji Nomi, Megumi Wakamiya		resume
2013	Magi: The Labyrinth of Magic	Young Jamil, Young Cassim		resume
2013	Sword Art Online	Yulier		resume
2014–19	Sailor Moon	Makoto Kino / Sailor Jupiter	Viz Media dub	
2015	Coppelion	Ibuki Kaiji		
2015	Durarara!!×2	Mikage Sharaku		resume
2015–17	Sailor Moon Crystal	Makoto Kino / Sailor Jupiter		
2016	Aldnoah.Zero	Rafia		
2016	Hunter × Hunter	Menchi	2011 series	
2016	Mobile Suit Gundam: Iron-Blooded Orphans	Ride Mass, Haba		
2016	Danganronpa 3: The End of Hope's Peak High School	Seiko Kimura (young)	Future Arc episode 5	
2017	K: Return of Kings	Sukuna Gojo		
2018–2024	Boruto: Naruto Next Generations	Boruto Uzumaki		

=== Animation ===
List of voice performances in animation
Year	Title	Role	Notes	Source
2011	Secret Millionaires Club	Skateboarder, Truffles the Pig		Resume
2019	Marvel Rising: Chasing Ghosts	Sheath		
2019	She-Ra and the Princesses of Power	Flutterina		
2020	DC Super Hero Girls	Ember		Episode: "#TheFreshPrincessOfRenFaire"
2021–22	Kid Cosmic	Jo		
2025	Pretty Pretty Please I Don't Want to be a Magical Girl	Zira		
2025	The Mighty Nein	Owelia, other voices		

=== Films ===
List of English dubbing performances in direct-to-video and television films
Year	Title	Role	Notes	Source
2011	Oblivion Island: Haruka and the Magic Mirror	Puppeteer Wife		
2017	Boruto: Naruto the Movie	Boruto Uzumaki		

List of English dubbing performances in feature films
Year	Title	Role	Notes	Source
2017	Sailor Moon R: The Movie	Sailor Jupiter	Viz dub Limited theatrical release	
2023	Suzume	Rumi Ninomiya		

=== Video games ===
List of voice and English dubbing performances in video games
Year	Title	Role	Notes	Source
2011	World of Warcraft: Cataclysm	Bronze Dragon Consort	Patch Hour of Twilight	resume
2012	Planetside 2	Vanu Sovereignty Soldier		
2012	Wipeout 3	Greg Grayson, Miss Gee Gee, Helena H. Cole	Wii version	resume
2013	Fire Emblem Awakening	Sully, Cherche		
2013	Hyperdimension Neptunia Victory	MAGES.		resume
2013	Wipeout: Create & Crash	Patty Popstar, Hannahsarus Rex, Charlene Holmes		resume
2014	Danganronpa series	Junko Enoshima, Toko Fukawa, Shirokuma	Roles shared with Erin Fitzgerald.	
2014	BlazBlue: Chrono Phantasma	Nine		resume
2014	Marvel Heroes	Kate Bishop / Hawkeye		
2015	Lord of Magna: Maiden Heaven	Francesca		
2015	Onechanbara Z2: Chaos	Kagura		resume
2015	Tales of Zestiria	Cardinal Forton		resume
2015	Xenoblade Chronicles X	Additional voices		
2016	Megadimension Neptunia VII	C-Sha		
2016	MegaTagmension Blanc + Neptune VS Zombies	Tamsoft		
2017	Nier: Automata	Jackass		
2017	Fire Emblem Heroes	Sully, Cherche, Elincia		
2017	Naruto Shippuden: Ultimate Ninja Storm 4	Boruto Uzumaki	Road to Boruto expansion pack	
2018	State of Decay 2	Survivor		Game credits
2018	Naruto To Boruto: Shinobi Striker	Boruto Uzumaki		resume
2019	Rage 2	Walker (Female)		
2020	Fallout 76: Steel Dawn	Sheena		
2023	Star Trek: Resurgence	Tylas		
