= Boruto Uzumaki =

Naruto franchise fictional character

- Naruto, Boruto character
- Boruto in Boruto: Naruto Next Generations (left) and in Boruto: Two Blue Vortex (right)
- First appearance: Naruto chapter 700: Naruto Uzumaki!! (2014)
- Created by: Masashi Kishimoto
- Voiced by: Japanese: Yuko Sanpei; Kokoro Kikuchi (The Last: Naruto the Movie); English: Amanda Celine Miller; Maile Flanagan (The Last: Naruto the Movie and Naruto Shippuden: Ultimate Ninja Storm 4)

In-universe information
- Family: Naruto Uzumaki (father); Hinata Uzumaki (mother); Himawari Uzumaki (younger sister); Kawaki Uzumaki (adoptive older brother)
- Relatives: Hanabi Hyuga (maternal aunt); Minato Namikaze (paternal grandfather, deceased); Kushina Uzumaki (paternal grandmother, deceased); Hiashi Hyuga (maternal grandfather); Unnamed maternal grandmother Hizashi Hyuga (maternal great-uncle, deceased); Neji Hyuga (first cousin once removed, deceased)
- Ninja rank: Genin in Boruto (Part I); Rogue Ninja in Boruto (Part II)
- Ninja team: Team 7 (Team Konohamaru)

Boruto Uzumaki (Japanese: うずまき ボルト, Hepburn: Uzumaki Boruto) is a fictional character created by Masashi Kishimoto who first appears in the series finale of the manga and anime series Naruto as the son of Naruto Uzumaki and Hinata Uzumaki. He later appears as the titular character and main protagonist in the 2015 anime film Boruto: Naruto the Movie where he is training as a ninja to surpass his father, the leader of the ninja village Konohagakure, and also being mentored by his father's best friend and former rival, Sasuke Uchiha. Boruto also serves as the main protagonist in the manga and anime series Boruto: Naruto Next Generations and the series sequel Boruto: Two Blue Vortex, where his constant fights with the Ōtsutsuki celestial resulted in him becoming an Ōtsutsuki genetically, giving him the name Boruto Ōtsutsuki (大筒木 ボルト, Ōtsutsuki Boruto) by some. Both with the retelling of the Boruto film, from his early training to his growth as a ninja fighting new menaces. Boruto also appears in video games, starting with Naruto Shippuden: Ultimate Ninja Storm 4.

Boruto's relationship with his father reflects Kishimoto's relationship with his children. The manga primarily focuses on his relationship with his adoptive brother Kawaki. In Japanese, Boruto is voiced by Kokoro Kikuchi in The Last: Naruto the Movie, and by Yūko Sanpei in all subsequent appearances. In English, he is voiced by Amanda C. Miller.

== Creation and conception ==
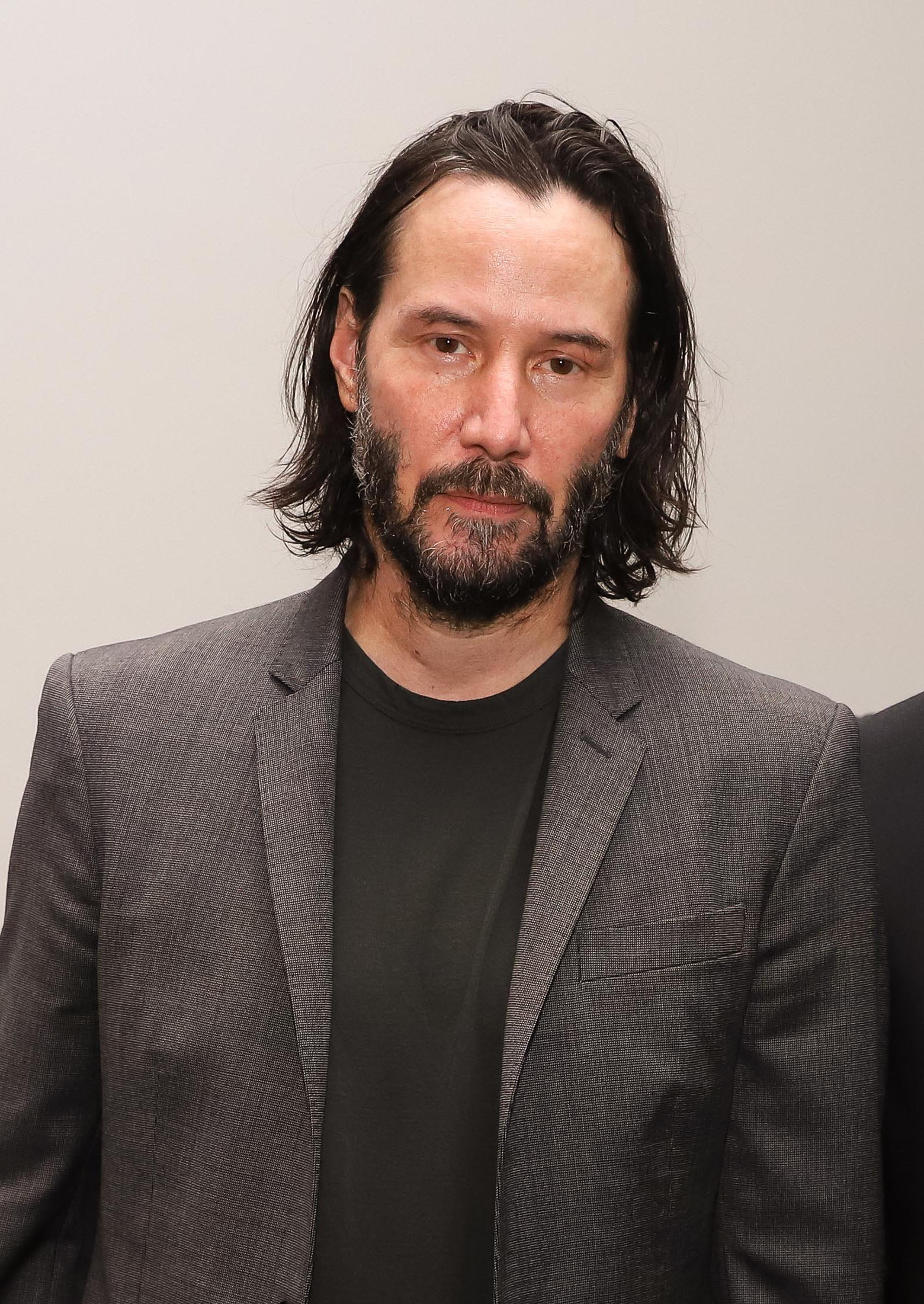
Keanu Reeves's character Neo from The Matrix served as a major influence in the making of Boruto's character

Masashi Kishimoto created Boruto in 2013 when the manga Naruto was at its climax. The motivation for the creation was him wanting Naruto Uzumaki to become a father when the manga ends. In the finale of Naruto, Boruto makes a prank in the mountain of Konoha that shows all its leaders, the Hokages. Kishimoto wanted Boruto to act like his father, but at the same time, have differences between each other. Despite not wishing to reveal much about Boruto due to developments of Boruto: Naruto Next Generations, he added that Boruto is not as direct as Naruto. Boruto's first name is a reference to his first cousin once removed Neji Hyuga as an homage to his death in Naruto while protecting both of Boruto's parents. In Boruto: Naruto the Movie, Kishimoto developed Boruto and Naruto's relationship from his relationship with his sons. He wanted the film to depict the father and son relationship between Boruto and Naruto. The film's theme song, "Diver" (ダイバー) by Kana-Boon, serves as a reference to Boruto. One of the singers of the band stated that it reflects how the character constantly changes from the beginning to the end of the story.

Boruto's mentorship by Naruto's rival and best friend Sasuke Uchiha was influenced due to the latter having few appearances in the Naruto movies. Kishimoto decided that he wanted Sasuke to have a major role in Boruto: Naruto the Movie, which he wrote. In the film, Sasuke becomes the teacher of Naruto's first son, Boruto, inspired by Piccolo from the Dragon Ball manga series by Akira Toriyama. A former enemy of Dragon Ball protagonist Goku, Piccolo becomes the teacher of Goku's first son, Gohan. Boruto anime and film director Hiroyuki Yamashita said that when first seeing the character in Sarada Uchiha's spin-off, he liked his character. In the making of the Boruto film, Yamashita said some scenes regarding to Boruto were removed due to time constraints such as one of the character's interactions with his father as well as another interaction between Boruto and Sarada. A difficult scene for the staff was the use of Boruto's Rasengan (螺旋丸; lit. spiral sphere, English manga: "Spiral Chakra Sphere") technique which had to disappear shortly after being used and then appearing again in an attack. The scene in which Naruto passes his son all of his chakra to increase his Rasengan was carefully storyboarded in the film.

When it comes to Boruto's role in the sequels to Naruto, Ikemoto was influenced by Keanu Reeves's character Neo from The Matrix franchise; similar to Neo, Boruto has the potential to become a saviour to his people and thus the manga focuses on Boruto's training to become such a strong ninja. Ikemoto sees Boruto as his most relatable character due to both having a really strong father they follow. His development into the end of Next Generations and the beginning of Two Blue Vortex there is a change of relationship between Boruto and Kawaki. Despite parallels between Naruto and Sasuke, Ikemoto claims both character have a different type of rivalry. Boruto being falsely accused as a traitor was an idea Ikemoto conceived early in the making of the series and looked forward into its development.

Although Boruto is the protagonist of Next Generations series, Ikemoto stated in early 2019 that the relationship between Boruto and Kawaki will be the most important point in the story as the manga is aimed to reach the flashforward scene from the first chapter where both characters start fighting against each other. In December 2020, Ikemoto stated that the anime would make further progress in regards to Kawaki's and Boruto's meeting. However, he still refrained from explaining the flashforward where the manga started. Ikemoto stated that in future chapters, there will be revealed more hints about the flashforward such as their growth, why they become hostile. According to Ikemoto, Boruto's character became similar to Sasuke in terms of loss, and in terms of achievement, he resembles Naruto. The Japanese band Asian Kung-Fu Generation also commented on Boruto's and Kawaki's relationship, believing that the series might end in the fated face-off between these two characters as they hope they overcome their issues.

=== Design ===
Concept artwork of Boruto by Masashi Kishimoto

In designing the character, Kishimoto intended Boruto to be similar to his father but at the same time avoided facial similarities in the eyes and cheeks due to the fact Naruto had the Nine-Tailed Demon Fox, Kurama, sealed inside him unlike his son. Additionally, he gave him a simpler costume than Naruto's original one that would yet remain the symbol of the Uzumaki clan. The author purposefully let Boruto wear his clothes casually by making him wear his jacket unzipped since he found it suitable for the character's personality. For the finale of the manga, Kishimoto originally intended to give Boruto the Byakugan, an eye technique which he would inherit from his mother Hinata Hyuga. However, the author forgot about it and instead gave him an unknown eye technique.

In the first few pages of the first chapter Boruto: Naruto Next Generations, an encounter between an older teenage Boruto against another one named Kawaki was briefly shown as a flashforward. The purpose was to attract more fans so they could look forward to the battle as it has a chaotic state to it. The battle against Kawaki was shown instead in the first chapter rather than Sasuke's one against Kinshiki Otsutsuki from the Boruto film to generate a different impact within the fans despite sharing the same storyline. Boruto's teenage design was first illustrated in little time. As a result, Mikio Ikemoto stated that once Boruto reached this moment, the older protagonist's design might change. As the authors wanted the character's fashion represent their personalities, the teenage Boruto wears clothes that he borrowed from Sasuke as a sign of respect toward him as his teacher and pride for his upbringing. As the story in the manga progresses, Boruto's facial expressions change when interacting with other character; with the friendly Tento, Boruto's eyes are shown bigger due to the portrayal of Boruto's childish personality. However, upon meeting Kawaki, Boruto's eyes are illustrated smaller due to the author's intent to show a more rebellious take on Boruto.

Due to the staff of the Naruto anime referring to Naruto and Sasuke as "legendary characters", anime developers Pierrot aim to carefully portray Boruto and his friends, the "new generation", as the new protagonists. They also seek to have them developed as the previous generation. However, Kishimoto is concerned about how Boruto and his friends could reach Naruto and Sasuke's strength as he finds it repetitive. Ikemoto stated that Boruto's look is predetermined by the storyline so the author instead could not draw the character on his own completely. However, the scene from the 9th chapter where Boruto creates a Rasengan with his father left a big impression on him, believing it was important for the storyline.

=== Voice actors ===
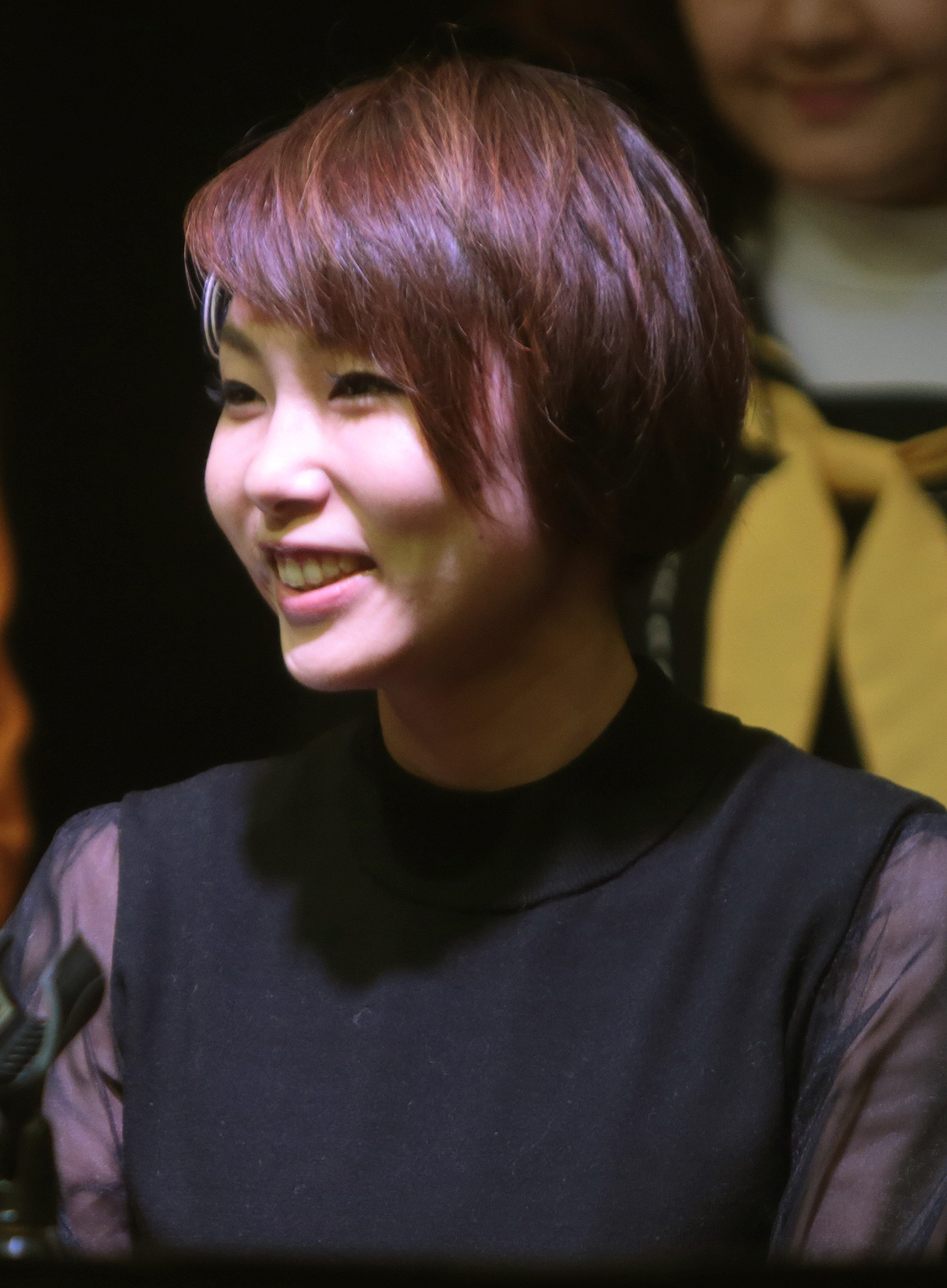
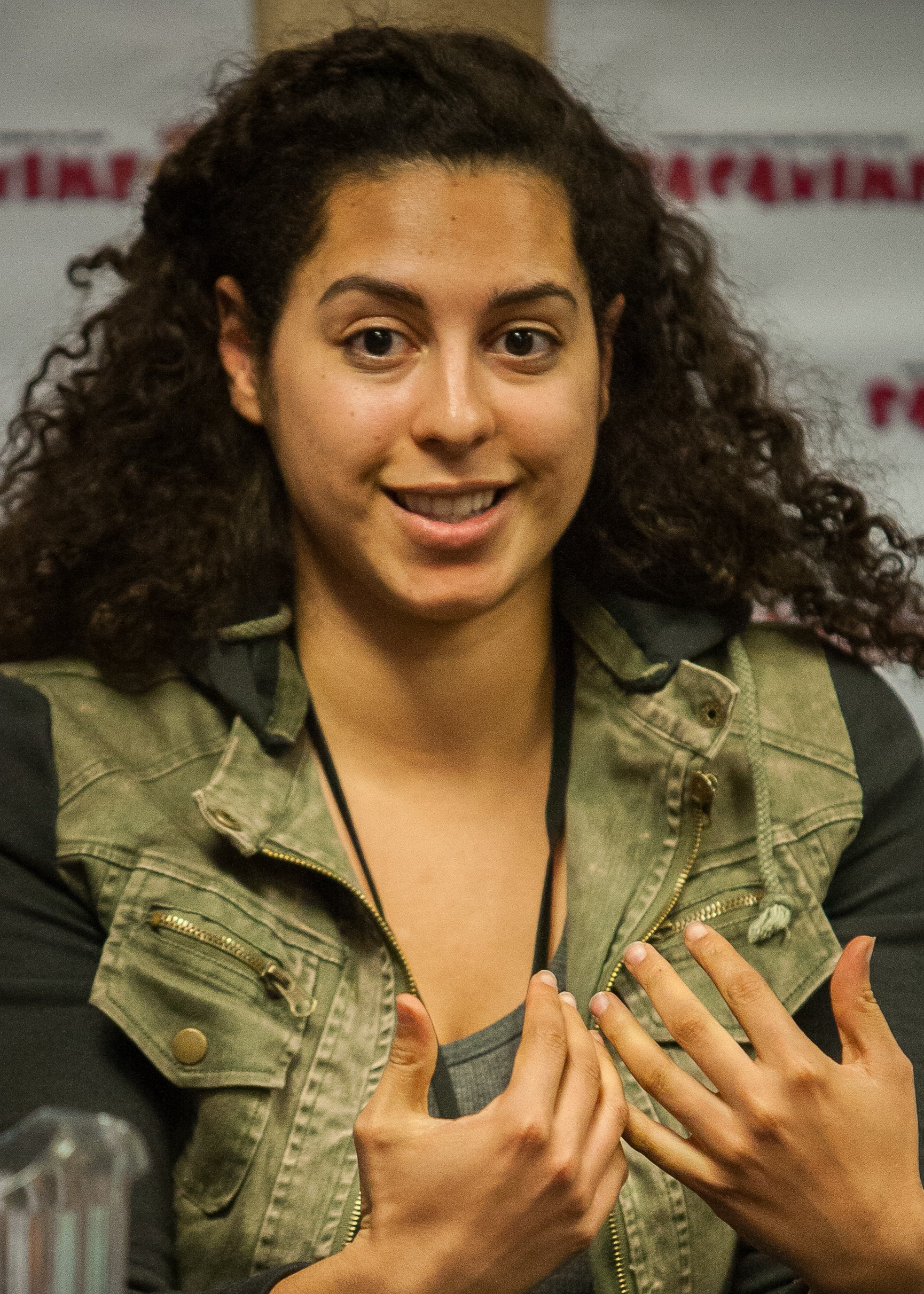
Yūko Sanpei (Japanese) and Amanda C. Miller (English), the actresses who voice Boruto Uzumaki

In the Japanese version, he was voiced by Kokoro Kikuchi in The Last as a toddler; for the Boruto film and anime, he is voiced by Yūko Sanpei. Sanpei has been a fan of the Naruto manga series ever since she was young. While identifying herself with Naruto Uzumaki's character, the actress noted the bond between her and Naruto became stronger when learning she would voice her son. As a result, once learning she got the role for Boruto's character, Sanpei bought the entire Naruto manga series despite already having it to prepare for the Boruto film. Sanpei was thankful for being offered this position and joked about how Junko Takeuchi became a "father" as her voice role was Naruto. Initially, Sanpei recalls having difficulties voicing Boruto; when she received her script for the film, she began to understand Boruto's concept as the boy who loves his father dearly, which helped her voice the character better. Please with the film Boruto, Sanpei asked Kishimoto to make another one which resulted in Kishimoto asking her to let him rest for another one.

In the English version, he was voiced by Maile Flanagan in The Last: Naruto the Movie film as a toddler and Amanda C. Miller in the Boruto film as a teenager. Boruto is the first main character Miller has ever voiced. While enjoying the work she does as Boruto's English voice, she stated she felt stress about it due to how important her character is considering his role in the story. Miller and the other Boruto English voice actors felt honored to play the characters based on how large the franchise is. Flanagan and Miller found the two family members similar in nature despite having different backgrounds.

== Appearances ==
=== In Naruto and stand alone works ===
First appearing in Naruto's finale, Boruto is a young boy who attends Konoha's ninja academy and often takes care of his younger sister, Himawari Uzumaki. Like Naruto, Boruto commits mischief to get attention, but for different reasons. Due to his father becoming the Seventh Hokage (the leader of Konoha), he does not spend any time with him as he used to. He makes a brief appearance in Naruto: The Seventh Hokage and the Scarlet Spring, where he gives a meal to his comrade Sarada Uchiha to pass on to his father; she becomes motivated to become the Hokage after the day she had. In the 2015 film Boruto: Naruto the Movie, and its retellings, Boruto joins the Chunin Examinations while gradually becoming frustrated by Naruto putting the village ahead of their family. Boruto ends up meeting his father's best friend and rival, Sarada's father Sasuke Uchiha, and managed to become his apprentice after learning to use the Rasengan while accidentally creating new variation of it. But when the exams commence, Boruto cheats causing his disqualification. As this happens, Naruto is captured by Momoshiki Otsutsuki while protecting their village from the Otsutsuki aliens's attack. Boruto realizes the error of his ways and joins Sasuke and the Kage to save Naruto. With the help of Naruto and Sasuke, Boruto defeats the powerful enemy Momoshiki with a Massive Rasengan. Although he resented the Hokage position, Boruto becomes resolute to become a strong vigilante to protect his village's leader in the same way as Sasuke, and entrusts Sarada to be a future Hokage instead of himself. Boruto also reprises his role in the novel adaptation of the movie, as well as part of an omake from the manga Sasuke Uchiha's Sharingan Legend where he trains with the title character.

=== In Boruto ===
Boruto's Jōgan

While the movie and manga open to Boruto after his graduation from the Ninja Academy, the anime adaptation shows him when still attending the school. Boruto manifests an Eye Technique called "Jōgan" or "Pure Eye" that allows him to see people's contaminated chakra. This enables him to solve the mystery of a "Ghost" corrupting fellow villagers alongside his friends, by finding the culprit. Boruto and his friends take a trip to the village of Kirigakure, befriending the young ninja Kagura Karatachi while stopping a coup by loyalists of their village's horrific Blood Mist traditions. Boruto later graduates and forms the new "Team 7" alongside Sarada and Mitsuki under the leadership of Konohamaru Sarutobi, and they start taking ninja missions. He is also present in two original video animations: one where he indirectly causes his father to be knocked out after accidentally breaking Himawari's doll and awakening the Byakugan on his younger sister, and another where Team Konohamaru is sent to stop an apparent thief.

Boruto's Kāma

In both versions of Boruto: Naruto Next Generations, Boruto is branded by a dying Momoshiki with a "cursed seal" in his right hand known as "Karma" (楔, Kāma). After the Momoshiki fight, Boruto becomes a bodyguard to the Fire Feudal Lord's son Tentō Madoka, befriending the boy while teaching him ninjutsu. Boruto later learns of the existence of a group known as "Kara", and he and his team meet a former Kara member named Kawaki, who is revealed in the series opening scene to become his arch-enemy when the two are older. As Boruto befriends Kawaki, the two learn of Kara's plans, and the consequences of possessing the Karma, which is the eventual resurrection of Momoshiki using Boruto's body. During a fight to save a kidnapped Naruto from a Kara member Boro, Boruto's Karma causes him to be possessed by Momoshiki and kills Boro. Later, while fighting the final Kara member, Code, and fearing Momoshiki's rebirth, Boruto sacrifices himself and lets Kawaki kill him in front of Naruto. However, Momoshiki resurrects his vessel and heals him using the Karma. After these events, an increasingly mentally unstable Kawaki seeks to kill Boruto to protect Naruto. Kawaki permanently seals Naruto and Hinata in another dimension called timeless dimension, then tries to kill Boruto once again, slashing his right eye while Boruto saves Sarada from Kawaki's attack. After his escape, Kawaki's wishes result in Kara defector Eida activating the Omnipotence and accidentally swapping his position with Boruto, rewriting everyone's memories (except for Sarada and Sumire) about Kawaki and Boruto. The village now hunts Boruto instead of Kawaki, considering him a traitor, and Kawaki uses this opportunity to frame Boruto for the "deaths" of Naruto and Hinata. However, Boruto is saved by Sasuke who decides to trust Sarada over his own fabricated memories. After Eida apologizes for her actions, Boruto and Sasuke go on a training journey to prepare for their return in the future.

During the three-year timeskip, Boruto and Sasuke were attacked by Code, and Sasuke was turned into a tree after being absorbed by one of Code's Ten-Tails clones. Boruto encountered former Kara member Koji Kashin, who warned him of the serious threats in the future and aided his training. Boruto later returns to Konoha to protect Sarada from Code, and then teleports to a dimension where he finds four evolved Humanoid Divine Tree creatures, led by Jura, who attacked him and Code, forcing them to retreat. After returning to his hideout with Koji, Boruto reunites with Sarada and Sumire in the village. He gets contacted telepathically by Shikamaru Nara, the acting Eighth Hokage, who figures out Boruto's true identity. Boruto quickly informs Shikamaru about the Divine Trees who proceed to invade Konoha. He teleports to the village to protect his loved ones from Sasuke's clone, Hidari. After defeating Hidari, Boruto gets shot by Jura and collapses. He gets arrested and tortured by Konoha shinobi, but "accidentally" gets rescued by Mitsuki on Shikamaru's secret orders. Then Boruto meets with Kawaki and secures an alliance with him to defeat the Divine Trees. As Team 7 battles the Divine Trees Ryu and Matsuri in the Land of Wind, Boruto plans to help them, but Koji Kashin warns him that if he appears, Jura will arrive and inevitably kill him. Ignoring his warning, Boruto saves Konohamaru and kills Matsuri. Jura immediately goes to the battlefield and beats Boruto to the brink of death, but Boruto is saved by Kawaki, who fights Jura to a draw. An entertained Jura leaves, as Boruto meets with Momoshiki, who has been silent for 3 years, in his mind. Boruto asks for Momoshiki's help, and in return will hand him his mind and body after they kill Jura. Momoshiki accepts and lets him use the Karma again. Later, Boruto helps defend Konoha from the Divine Tree Mamushi's invasion, targeting Eida. He also saves the life of Kobu, an influential politician who plans to remove Shikamaru from his role as Hokage suspecting that he is helping Boruto, from the attack of Mamushi.

=== In other media ===
Outside manga and anime, Boruto also appears in the fighting game Naruto Shippuden: Ultimate Ninja Storm 4, first only in the ending and playable in the expansion pack Road to Boruto. Following Momoshiki's defeat, Boruto can fight against Naruto. Although Boruto gets exhausted and loses, his father states he is proud of how much he developed his skills, pleasing Boruto. In 2019, CyberConnect2 CEO Hiroshi Matsuyama received multiple requests by fans to develop another Storm game but claimed that this was meant to be the final game in the series. Nevertheless, he claims Bandai Visual is up to decide if the developers should develop a new series of games focused on Boruto. He appears in the video game Naruto to Boruto: Shinobi Striker as a playable character, as well as Naruto x Boruto: Ninja Voltage. He is also featured in the Boruto light novels.

== Reception ==
Critical reception to Boruto's character has been generally mixed. While comparing Boruto's traits to main characters often seen in other manga series, McNulty felt that Boruto's growth across the anime series helped to make him more likable. On the other hand, Andy Hanley from UK Anime Network said despite his similar design and actions to his father Naruto, Boruto is not like him and has a different personality. Amy McNulty from Anime News Network and Hanley enjoyed Boruto's relationship with his father Naruto due to the differences in their childhoods and how that becomes the focus of the film Boruto: Naruto the Movie. McNulty also liked how Boruto develops as he became afraid of his father's fate during an attack from the antagonist. Richard Eisenbeis from Kotaku was critical to Boruto's development, as he felt that his bond with his father at the end of the Boruto film was unthinkable and weak. Alexandria Hill from Otaku USA enjoyed Boruto's fight against the film's villain, Momoshiki, and his team-up with Naruto and Sasuke. Leroy Douresseaux liked how Boruto's character has already started development by the second volume of the series. For the TV anime, Beveridge remarked Boruto's characterization which he felt was superior to the one from the manga. Anime Now felt Boruto's first enemies were more lighthearted than his predecessors. Viz Media senior director Kevin Hamric noted that while he initially displays a lazy demeanor, Boruto seeks to fight and surpass his father. Melina Dargis liked how Boruto realizes his father's goals and joins Sasuke and the Kages in order to save Naruto. Additionally, Dargis noted Boruto's early strained relationship with his father as well as his use of technology to fight might reflect on modern audiences who might understand his character more as a result. Rebecca Silverman from Anime News Network praised how the writers manage to develop Boruto's angst without coming across as "teen whining" and how Sasuke Uchiha decides to train him upon seeing his similarities with his father.

The misrelationship Boruto forms with his adoptive brother Kawaki was seen as a striking rivalry similar to the one his father had with Sasuke in the first series. Beveridge enjoyed the foreshadow of an older Boruto on a fight against Kawaki in the series' pilot chapter, looking forward to their development. The eventual debut of Boruto in his teenage appearance earned praise by Screen Rant, Siliconera and IGN with former praising his new skills and the latter looking forward to his fated duel with Kawaki which has been attracting more readers. His personality also stood out for being calmer and more threatening when interacting with Code fitting for Sasuke's student. Hindustan Times noted that Boruto achieved high popularity online due to the new skills he shows off while facing Code.

Journalists also focused on Boruto's voice actresses. Toon Zone enjoyed Miller's performance as Boruto for making him a come across as a believable male character despite the actress being female. On the other hand, Yuko Sanpei's performance was criticized for giving a pitch equal to that of Junko Takeuchi's Naruto despite the latter being an adult. The New York Times claimed that it was common that young male characters were voiced by women citing other characters with English actresses including Goku from Dragon Ball and Monkey D. Luffy from One Piece. Miller also noted that while her character was initially polarizing to viewers due to Boruto not being aware of his father's past, he still acted as realistic child and often showed signs of affection ever since his introduction in the 2015 movie where he cries in joy when being motivated by him. Anime News Network also praised Amanda C. Miller's role as Boruto's English actor, but feeling the voice often sounded more feminine than his Japanese counterpart.

=== Analysis ===
In The Meaning Of Moral Messages In Anime Films Boruto: Naruto The Movie, writers from University of Bengkulu claims Boruto's role involves in his first appearance explores relationships between parents and children which might reach the audience who also tend to suffer these types of relationships. Boruto is already early in the film in conflict with father during their first interactions when their morals about how ninja missions should work as the son is cocky about his own skills while the father instead tells him he should rely on his teammates too. According to the writer, Sarada oversees Boruto's growth as, while she claims that she aims to become the next Hokage, she also believes her teammate also wishes to become one too. By the final scene of the movie, Boruto decides with noticeable smile that he does not want to become a Hokage due to him finding himself fitting like his father but instead wants to be the ninja who will support Sarada once she achieves her dream instead. The firmness of Boruto's stance is also confirmed by the scene that appears, in which Boruto utters his sentence with a smiling face and his stance about what will be achieved in the future.

Antônio Guilherme Bernardes Galletti from University of São Paulo notes Boruto starts noticing the different skills his father possesess when Sasuke has him try to learn the Rasengan which makes the skilled student find a challenging training in his life for the first time. Across the film, Boruto tries taking easy steps to achieve greatness but changes his point of view after seeing Naruto and Sasuke in action for the first time. The film makes Boruto's character become complex when learning of the shinobi code his father and master use which was also compared to the samurais' bushido while developing a sense of individuality when deciding what to do with his life when growing up. Boruto's decision in the ending stands out from other characters who follow their previous generation.

In a popularity poll of the 2015 movie, Boruto was voted as the third best character behind Mitsuki and Sarada. In poll from 2021, Boruto took the top place. Denki Kaminarimon's voice actress, Chihiro Ikki, said she liked how Boruto protects Denki from bullies in the series' beginning having once being bullied when she was younger and saw Boruto as an ideal hero. Boruto' design and name have also been used as part of the famous mascot Pikachu in Pokémon the Series: Sun & Moon.
