= Mitsuki (Naruto) =

Fictional character from Naruto

- Naruto, Boruto: Naruto Next Generations character
- Mitsuki as designed by Masashi Kishimoto
- First appearance: Naruto chapter 700+1 - Sarada Uchiha (2015)
- Created by: Masashi Kishimoto
- Voiced by: Japanese; Ryuichi Kijima; English; Robbie Daymond

In-universe information
- Family: Orochimaru (parent)
- Ninja rank: Genin
- Ninja team: Team Konohamaru

Mitsuki (Japanese: ミツキ, Hepburn: Mitsuki) is a fictional character created by manga artist Masashi Kishimoto. He was first introduced in the Naruto spin-off manga Naruto: The Seventh Hokage and the Scarlet Spring (2015), being portrayed as a transfer student attending classes in Konohagakure to become a ninja. By the events of the film Boruto: Naruto the Movie (2015), Mitsuki has become a ninja on a team with protagonist Boruto Uzumaki and Sarada Uchiha, taking a lead role in Ukyō Kodachi and Mikio Ikemoto's manga sequel to Naruto, Boruto: Naruto Next Generations (2016), and its anime prequel, which shows how he became friends with Boruto while facing different enemies. A one-shot by Kishimoto reveals that Mitsuki is an experiment created by the Legendary Sannin and former enemy of Naruto, Orochimaru, who allowed him to take his own path in life.

In the making of the film Boruto and the anime series, Hiroyuki Yamashita was in charge of developing the character despite his small role in the film. Critical pen reception to Mitsuki has been mixed. While his role in the Boruto film was criticized for its lack of development, both his backstory portrayed in the one-shot and his role in Boruto: Naruto Next Generations were praised for adding depth to his character, even though he remained a mysterious child.

== Creation and conception ==
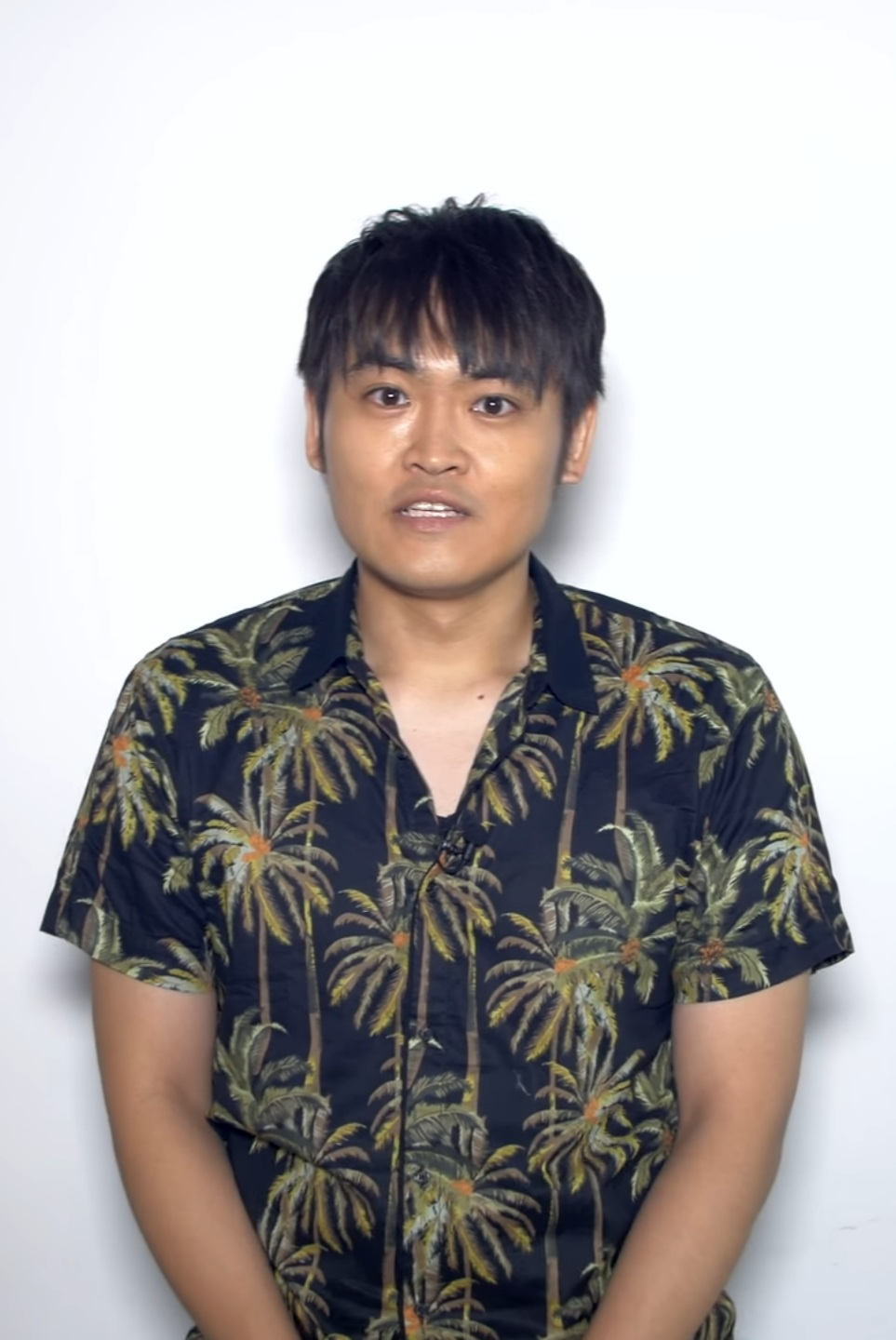
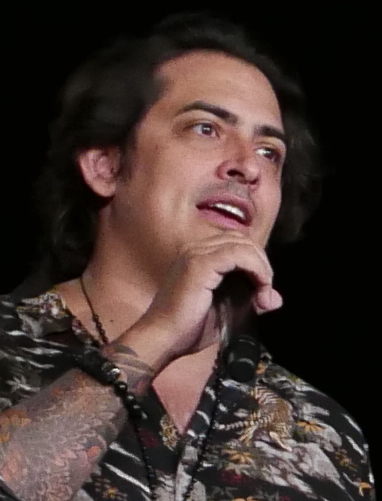
Ryuichi Kijima (Japanese) and Robbie Daymond (English), the actors who voice Mitsuki

Masashi Kishimoto designed Mitsuki to provide hints to his lineage through his snake-themed features such as his eyes. He originally had a shoulder length bob, but the author decided to change his hair to make him look more appealing, giving him a short white hairstyle instead. Mitsuki was given a kimono with long sleeves. Rather than making the outfit casual, Kishimoto made it suitable for war by hiding Mitsuki's hands in the design, making it difficult for people to know his intentions. He was also equipped with a ninja tool pouch, which is longer than regular pouches, on the fastener of his sash.

Boruto anime director Hiroyuki Yamashita commented on Mitsuki's part in the film, saying that he was much more of a gentle character. After reading the character's own story, Yamashita felt that Mitsuki's image was solidified. After the first screening, there was a scene that showed Mitsuki's true form, and the director recalled that everyone was stirred up by it. That was the first time he thought, "it seems that (Mitsuki) might be intriguing". Afterward, he remembered being praised by Kishimoto, but Yamashita pointed out that he had not felt any satisfaction. In the making of the Boruto film, the character guidebook described Mitsuki as "An enigma shrouded in many mysteries. A boy with a composed expression... His slightly-long white hair has a waviness to it." Once the Boruto: Naruto Next Generations anime started, the director said that, while in the beginning Mitsuki and Sarada Uchiha were only classmates, the two would have "a more developed relationship from now on".

Mitsuki's Japanese voice actor, Ryuichi Kijima, stated that he had been asked by the staff to sound emotionless. However, Kijima gave him a more notable characterization, citing his dynamic with Boruto since Mitsuki tends to help him. In the English dub, Mitsuki is voiced by Robbie Daymond, who said he is very honored to voice the character. Daymond and the other Boruto English voice actors were grateful to play the characters given how large the franchise is.

== Appearances ==
Mitsuki makes his first appearance in the Naruto spin-off manga Naruto: The Seventh Hokage and the Scarlet Spring (2015) as a young child training to become a ninja. By the events of the film Boruto: Naruto the Movie (2015), Mitsuki has become a low-ranking ninja, Genin, teaming up with Boruto Uzumaki and Sarada Uchiha, and led by Konohamaru Sarutobi. In the film, the team takes part the Chunin Exams, to improve their ranking. After the post-credits scene, Mitsuki confesses to Boruto and Sarada that he is the son of the former criminal Orochimaru, shocking Sarada except Boruto.

Mitsuki's backstory is explored in Naruto Gaiden: The Road Illuminated by the Full Moon (2016), where it is revealed that Mitsuki is an artificial human created by Orochimaru. Mitsuki decides to abandon his master and sets out toward Konohagakure to find Boruto, whom he regards as his "sun". The manga series Boruto: Naruto Next Generations (2016) by Ukyō Kodachi and Mikio Ikemoto begins by retelling the events from the film, but afterward both Mitsuki and Sarada reject a ninja mission in order to save Boruto from an assassin. He later accepts a mission to help Boruto, Kawaki, Sarada, Shikadi, Inojin, and ChoCho keep an eye on Eida and Daemon. He is one of the many people who is affected by Eida's omnipotence and tries to capture Boruto but fails.

The anime series of Boruto: Naruto Next Generations (2017) shows Mitsuki's entrance into the ninja academy, and his befriending of Boruto and his classmates in ninja training. Mitsuki helps Boruto find the criminal behind the "Ghost" attacks. In a following arc, Mitsuki goes on a trip to Kirigakure where he joins the Mist ninjas and his allies in trying to stop a rebellion led by seven swordsmen. Following this arc, Mitsuki declares he will become a ninja to keep track of Boruto, feeling his encounter with him has changed his way of seeing life. After this arc, Mitsuki and his friends become ninjas after passing a test, and he, Boruto, and Sarada form the new "Team 7" under the leadership of Konohamaru. In an anime-exclusive arc, Mitsuki seemingly defects from the Leaf Village, and his friends go on a mission to prove his innocence to their superiors. They learn that Mitsuki is travelling with a group of artificial humans known as Fabrications from the Stone Village, who wish to perform a coup. He is eventually revealed to be acting as a spy, and once again joins his team after defeating the leader of the Fabrications, Ku.

Apart from the manga and anime, Mitsuki appears in the Boruto light novels. He is also a playable character in the fighting game Naruto Shippuden: Ultimate Ninja Storm 4 (2016). He also appears in an original video animation where Team Konohamaru is sent to stop an apparent thief. He is also playable in the video game Naruto to Boruto: Shinobi Striker (2018). Mitsuki is the son of Orochimaru.

== Reception ==
Critical reception to Mitsuki's character has been mixed based on his limited appearances in the film's story as well as his role in the printed and animated series. Thais Valdivia of Hobby Consolas stated that while Mitsuki's characterization was not properly executed in the film due to his limited appearances, his post-credit scenes would surprise the audience because of the revelation behind his heritage. The Fandom Post writer Chris Homer expressed a similar belief regarding the limited exploration of Mitsuki's character until the film's ending. Toon Zone felt that Mitsuki and Sarada provided good contrasts to Boruto in the film and also praised Robbie Daymond for his work as Mitsuki's English voice actor. Similarly, Amy McNulty of Anime News Network praised Daymond's performance, saying that while being "calm, collected, and oftentimes emotionless, the voice helps lend the character much of his mystery". Sarah Nelkin of Anime Now felt Mitsuki had no development in the film despite being a recurring fighter supporting the lead character.

Once Mitsuki's past was explored in Masashi Kishimoto's one-shot manga, McNulty felt his origins were engaging, but at the same time not completely explained, and believed this was due to the ambiguous nature of the one-shot. Similarly, Melina Dargis, another The Fandom Post writer, considered Mitsuki's chapter the best in the first volume of the Boruto manga due to his connections with Orochimaru, and she felt it could have been used in the film. Nik Freeman of Anime News Network found Mitsuki's backstory one of the best in the franchise's history because it was not a rehash of prior story arcs. Rebecca Silverman of the same site wondered how Mitsuki's origins might clash with Boruto's as the series' main theme due to the issues they both face: the relationship between children and their parents.

After Mitsuki had debuted in the Boruto anime television series, McNulty wrote that while his introduction was overshadowed by the episode's focus on his ninja academy teacher Shino Aburame, his role fitted into the story and she still found him mysterious. She also praised his actions in the episode as well as his interactions with Boruto. Sam Stewart of IGN had similar thoughts, saying that, like Sarada, Mitsuki was not properly introduced in his debut because the plot focused on Shino. In a later review, McNulty considered Mitsuki and Boruto's fight against the Ghost culprit, Sumire Kakehi, one of the best in the Boruto anime. Stewart agreed, saying that the fight was well-animated despite there being minor issues with the animation in other parts from the sequence. Nelkin felt the series succeeded in exploring more of Mitsuki, which was needed considering his minor role in the film. The writer additionally compared him with Naruto character Sai since both rarely express their emotions during their introductions into the series. Nelkin also described Mitsuki as a "character that is growing as a person as he spends time with his comrades", the teenagers attending the ninja academy. In poll from 2021, Mitsuki was voted as the eighth best character from Boruto: Naruto Next Generations.
