= Orochimaru (Naruto) =

Fictional character from Naruto

- Naruto character
- Orochimaru by Masashi Kishimoto
- First appearance: Naruto chapter 45: The Second Exam (2000)
- Voiced by: Japanese: Kujira; Yuriko Yamaguchi (Shiore); Mayumi Yamaguchi (young) Sachiko Kojima (female body); Masahiko Tanaka (fourth Kazekage); English: Steve Blum; Mary Elizabeth McGlynn (female body and Shiore); Crispin Freeman (Fourth Kazekage)

In-universe information
- Children: Mitsuki (son)
- Ninja rank: Rogue Ninja

Orochimaru (大蛇丸) is a character from Naruto, a manga series created by Masashi Kishimoto. Orochimaru is a former ninja from the village of Konohagakure who is well known for work in wars which earned him the title of Sannin and becomes a terrorist as a means to cheat death, and built his own ninja village Otogakure. He succeeds to some extent in obtaining immortality by transferring between different host bodies, which became one of his driving motivations throughout the series as he targets Sasuke Uchiha for his genetic heritage. By the events of Boruto: Naruto Next Generations, he has seemingly redeemed himself and has sent his experiment Mitsuki to Konoha to become a ninja. Orochimaru has appeared in media outside the Naruto anime and manga, including several video games.

Based on Japanese mythology, Orochimaru was created as one of the series' main antagonists, and was intended to represent the opposite of the protagonists' morals and values. His snake-like appearance features were intended to make it easier for the reader to recognize that he is a villain. Orochimaru is voiced by Kujira in the Japanese version, and by Steve Blum in the English dub.

Several anime and manga publications have praised and criticized Orochimaru's character. He has been praised as one of the series' premiere villains by reviewers for his lack of redeeming qualities and open malevolence. Among the Naruto reader base, Orochimaru has been a popular character, ranking within the top twenty in several polls. Numerous pieces of merchandise with Orochimaru's likeness have been released, including action figures, posters, and plush dolls.

== Creation and conception ==
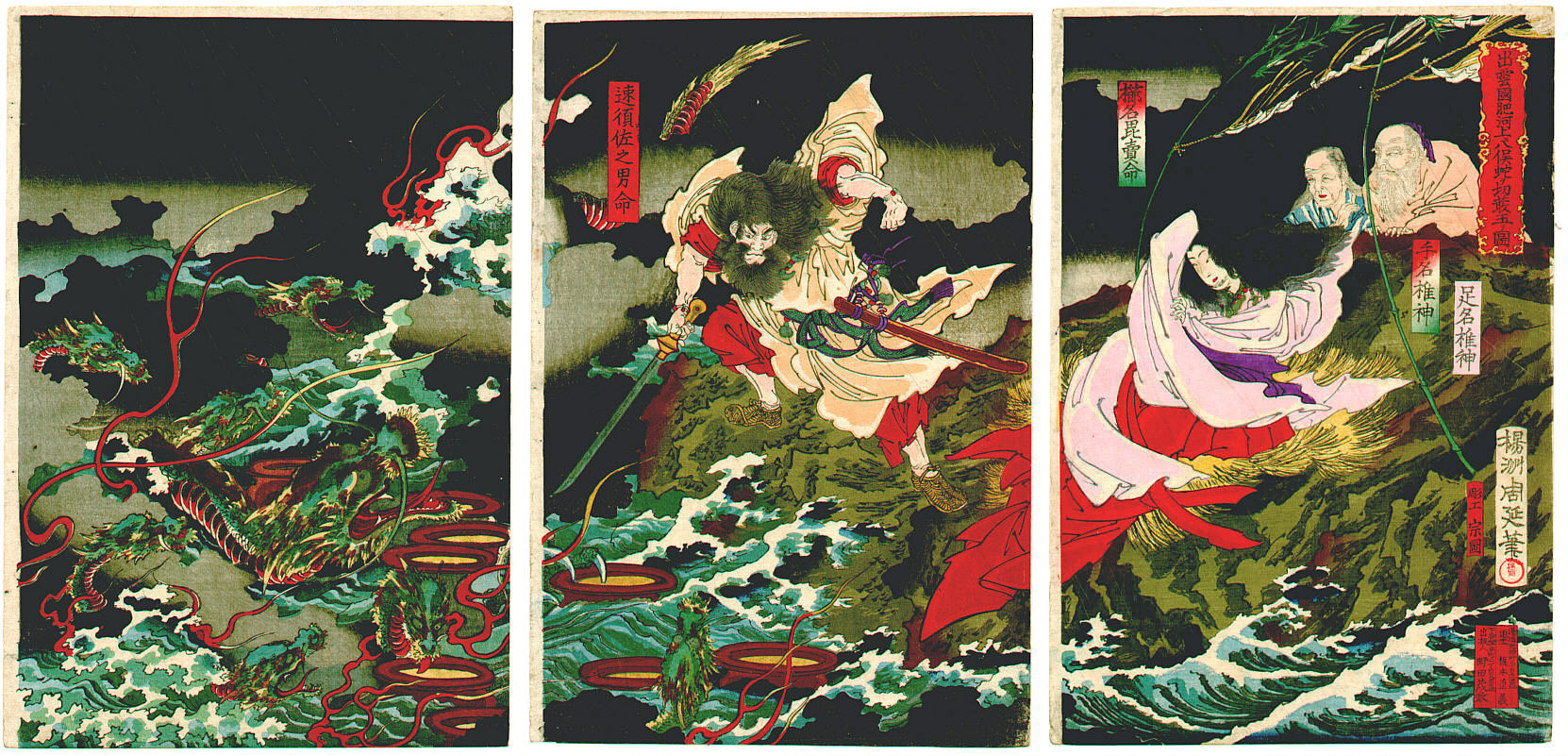
Yamata no Orochi fighting Susanno. This scene is similarly shown in Naruto.

Most of the traits of Orochimaru's character were taken from Japanese mythology. Orochimaru originates from the Japanese folktale Jiraiya Gōketsu Monogatari where he opposes the title character who also appears in Naruto as his former ally. He wields a sword named Kusanagi, which is said to be related to the creature known as the Yamata no Orochi; in Japanese mythology, Yamata no Orochi is defeated by the god Susanoo, a scene which is re-imagined in the manga and anime: Orochimaru uses a technique called Yamata no Orochi, but is ultimately defeated by Itachi Uchiha's Susanoo technique.

The introduction of Orochimaru to the series was first suggested by Masashi Kishimoto's superiors to improve the series' popularity. Kishimoto believed the series grew personality based on the Chunin Exams story arc and wanted it to end normally with Shikamaru Nara's victory. However, he eventually accepted their advice and Orochimaru was used to interrupt the arc. In an interview, Kishimoto asserted that making the villains "flamboyant" was one of his "guiding principles", and attributed this to his desire to have the villains have a "powerful aura". When asked if Orochimaru was still good, Kishimoto answered that Orochimaru is "truly evil" and that he is one of the several "hopeless evil characters" that appear in the series. Kishimoto originally planned to make Orochimaru look androgynous, but made him creepier due to the concept of him being a strong antagonist. Out of most of the characters, Orochimaru was the hardest one to write. Kishimoto wanted him to be a terrifying opponent, so he wondered if that was really the way to go to make him sound strong: "Then I started thinking it was good like that, he's strong and creepy, and the creepiness started increasing."

To follow the theme of distinguishing villains, Kishimoto attempted to make Orochimaru's face appear "pasty and sickly", which serves to emphasize the "scary looks" that Orochimaru expresses in the manga. Orochimaru's nature types are fire, earth, and wind. As these occurrences are his "trademark", Kishimoto modifies Orochimaru's appearance and the scene to focus on Orochimaru's face; for instance, highlights that are normally added to Orochimaru's hair are removed and the background is blanked out to create a "creepy atmosphere".

== Appearances ==
=== In Naruto ===
Orochimaru acts as the primary antagonist for the first part of the series. After his parents were killed when he was young, Orochimaru's only source of affection was his teacher — Hiruzen Sarutobi, the Third Hokage — and his two teammates. As they grew older, Orochimaru, Jiraiya, and Tsunade collectively became known as the Legendary Sannin (伝説の三忍, Densetsu no Sannin) due to their exemplary ninja abilities in the Second Great Ninja War against Hanzo of the Salamander. Many of Orochimaru's abilities deal with snakes, which he summons to battle multiple opponents while simultaneously keeping himself out of harm's way. Through his experiments, he has been able to add some snake-like characteristics to his own body. In his desire to attain immortality to learn every jutsu (lit. 'technique'), Orochimaru developed a forbidden jutsu to steal his victim's body. Although he is essentially immortal, Orochimaru learns the process can not be done more than once every three years.

Orochimaru craved more power than could be obtained from training with his master and began abducting Konohagakure villagers for various experiments, with Yamato among his surviving victims. Unwilling to bring himself to harm Orochimaru upon learning of his actions, Hiruzen allowed his former pupil to escape and flee the village. Orochimaru eventually joined the criminal organization, Akatsuki and became partners with a fellow rogue ninja named Sasori. However, after his attempt to steal the body of Itachi Uchiha through a forbidden jutsu to gain the Sharingan (写輪眼; lit. "Copy Wheel Eye", English manga: "Mirror Wheel Eye") failed, Orochimaru was forced to leave the organization. Orochimaru then founded his own ninja village, Otogakure, populated with ninjas loyal to him. They mostly serve as test subjects in his experimentation to become an ultimate being and as pawns to do his dirty work.

During the Chunin Exams, Orochimaru plans the invasion of Konoha with the ninja of Sunagakure to not only kill Hiruzen, but also claim the body of Itachi's brother Sasuke Uchiha. To that end, Orochimaru infiltrates the Chunin Exam during the Forest of Death portion by killing a Kusagakure ninja named Shiore, assumes her identity, and personally tests Sasuke before branding him with a Curse Mark. For the duration of the Exams, Orochimaru lays in wait and secretly murders the Fourth Kazekage to assume his identity and get close to his mentor as the invasion begins. However, Orochimaru is forced to retreat when Hiruzen sacrifices himself through the Reaper Death Seal to take away Orochimaru's ability to perform jutsu, with his forces pulling back while Sunagakure later learns of Orochimaru's treachery. Orochimaru attempts to get aid from Tsunade before seeking out another way to cure himself in an attempt to be able to use jutsu again. When all his efforts prove unsuccessful, Orochimaru sends his Sound Four to fetch Sasuke in the hopes that a body-transfer will allow him to use his arms again. When Sasuke takes too long to arrive, Orochimaru is forced to switch to the body of one of his prisoners instead, and decides to train him until the day that he will be able to take Sasuke's body for himself.

Two and a half years later, in the second part of the series, Orochimaru confronts Naruto and his friends when they attempt to track down Sasuke. When Sasuke attempts to kill Naruto, Orochimaru dissuades him by pointing out the Naruto's use in taking down Akatsuki and thus reducing the number of enemies he has. Sasuke eventually uses his Sharingan to void Orochimaru's technique and retains control of his body while trapping Orochimaru's soul within him, which gives Sasuke access to many of Orochimaru's abilities in the process. During Sasuke's later fight with Itachi, Sasuke is left too weak to continue suppressing Orochimaru's soul, allowing Orochimaru to escape and try to take his body again. Before he can do so, Itachi seals him away.

After Kabuto's defeat, Sasuke learns of Orochimaru's survival, as the Cursed Seals are revealed to hold copies of Orochimaru's consciousness in them, along with Orochimaru's cells that Kabuto injected into himself and subjugated. Using the Cursed Seal Orochimaru placed on his former student Anko Mitarashi, Sasuke releases Orochimaru and gives him a new body that Jugo provides with an absorbed part of Kabuto's flesh. Despite expressing no interest in the ongoing war and still desiring to claim Sasuke's body, Orochimaru joins Sasuke in his quest for answers over the nature of ninja, taking him and Taka to the Nara Shrine, where he undoes the Reaper Death Seal and regains the use of ninjutsu before transferring his being into a White Zetsu clone placed on Sasuke. In his new body, Orochimaru brings the first four Hokage back to life with the Reanimation Jutsu to give Sasuke the answers he wants. Seeing that his methods were flawed from inside Kabuto and interested in observing his former apprentice's new path, Orochimaru aids the Allied Shinobi Forces by helping Tsunade and the Kage, and assists in subduing the Shinju. After the Fourth Great Ninja War ends, among those caught under Madara's Infinite Tsukuyomi before being freed, Orochimaru resumes his experiments, albeit in a more humane manner, with Sasuke's Taka teammates supporting him as lab assistants, though Konoha remains suspicious of him and keeps tight surveillance on him in case he resumes his former human experimentation activities.

=== In Boruto ===
In the sequel series Boruto: Naruto Next Generations, which takes place 15 years after Naruto, Orochimaru created two artificial humans based on his DNA, naming the youngest Mitsuki whom he considers a son and sends to live in Konoha to find his own path in life. He also appears in the Naruto: The Seventh Hokage and the Scarlet Spring side story with his younger appearance noted by the confused main characters.

=== Appearances in other media ===
Out of the five films on the series, Orochimaru so far has only appeared in the fifth Naruto film, Naruto Shippūden 2: Bonds. He briefly appears in the fifth OVA "The Cross Roads". Orochimaru is a playable character in nearly all Naruto video games, including the Clash of Ninja series and the Ultimate Ninja series. In some games, he utilizes variations of his techniques not seen in the anime or manga, and in the second installment of the Ultimate Ninja series, Sealed Arms Orochimaru is available as a separate character. Gekitō Ninja Taisen! EX 2 marks the first appearance of Orochimaru in a video game set in Part II, with the second one being Ultimate Ninja 5.

Orochimaru also appears in two light novels from the franchise: in Sasuke's Story, he aids Sasuke in a mission by providing him information about his target, and in Konoha Hiden, he makes a cameo congratulating Naruto Uzumaki and Hinata Hyuga's wedding.

=== In music ===
American rapper Lucy Bedroque named the seventh track off his studio album C after the character.

== Reception ==
Orochimaru has been featured consistently in the Weekly Shonen Jump popularity polls, commonly placing in the top twenty characters. However, in the last popularity poll, he was out of the top thirty characters. Merchandise based on Orochimaru has also been released, including action figures, plush dolls, and key chains. AnimeCentral listed him as the tenth best villain in anime due to his objectives and methods, particularly how he scares Sasuke Uchiha the first time seeing him despite Sasuke's strength. In the book Listverse.com's Ultimate Book of Bizarre Lists: Fascinating Facts and Shocking Trivia on Movies, Music, Crime, Celebrities, History, and More by Jamie Frater, Orochimaru was listed as the eighth most evil villain with the writer calling him "pure evil".

Several publications for manga, anime, video games, and other related media praised and criticized Orochimaru's character. IGN writer Jason Van Horn compared Orochimaru's search for power and subsequent fall into villainy to that of Darth Sidious from Star Wars, and labeled Orochimaru as "something more than just pure evil". Justin Rich from Mania Entertainment considered Orochimaru the "first real villain" of the series, noting that unlike Zabuza Momochi, the villain of the previous arc, he had no redeeming qualities. DVDTalk's Todd Douglass Jr. celebrated the introduction of Orochimaru into the series, as well as the potential plot development from the curse seal Orochimaru placed on Sasuke, describing it as one of the best parts of the series. Carl Kimlinger from Anime News Network stated that Orochimaru's influence over Sasuke kept the tension high, even when he had minor appearances. Javier Lugo from Manga Life praised the fight between Orochimaru and the Third Hokage based on the surprises this encounter showed. Bamboo Dong from Anime News Network labeled Orochimaru as a character that can not be killed. IGN's Charles White considered Orochimaru as "one of the more interesting characters on the show" as he stated Orochimaru "can literally steal the show at any time". A. E. Sparrow from the same site praised Orochimaru's scenario in the 13th volume of the manga as he interrupts the story arc to engage with the Third Hokage in a possible deathmatch despite interrupting the fight between Sasuke and Gaara which readers had been looking for.

After Orochimaru's fight against the Hokage, About.com writer Deb Aoki commented that Orochimaru was in such poor shape to the point where he was replaced by Akatsuki as the new antagonists. In the book The Rough Guide to Manga, Jason S. Yadao noted Orochimaru's impact in Part I of the series due to his influence on one of the protagonists, Sasuke, to abandon his comrades and join him. Holly Ellingwood from Active Anime described him as "sinister" and noted his proposal to revive Tsunade's loved ones in exchange for healing his arms made it appealing. Additionally, Kimlinger considered Kujira, Orochimaru's Japanese voice actress, to be one of the best from the series. Orochimaru's transfer of bodies was used as a reference by manga author Gege Akutami for his work Jujutsu Kaisen where an ancient being changes bodies as time progresses, more prominently the one of Suguru Geto.

Despite the character's minor appearances in Part II, most of them were well received. The way Orochimaru angers Naruto Uzumaki in their battle and his management over events ever since his reintroduction are deemed as "near perfect" by Mania's Chris Beveridge. Orochimaru's fight against Sasuke in later parts of the series is praised by Manga Life's Park Cooper due to how it changes "the nature of things" in a short time. While Beveridge agrees with Cooper, he finds that the fight did not bring a certain end to Orochimaru, which he thought would have made it more entertaining. On the other hand, Beveridge likes how a flashback showed Orochimaru's backstory in Konoha, which helped explain the reason for his character during the fight between the two. His apparent redemption to follow Sasuke in later parts of the story is criticized by writer Jason Thompson during a review of the manga. On the other hand, Bryce Coulter from the Fandom Post finds Orochimaru's change based on Sasuke's new interest intriguing due to the future possibilities of becoming Konohagakure's ally. Ramsey Isler from IGN praises the relationship between Orochimaru and his ally Kabuto as the former often wondered if Kabuto was ever going to betray him. In the final episodes of the anime Naruto Shippuden, Orochimaru made small cameos during the preparations for Naruto and Hinata's wedding which Amy Mcnulty from Anime News Network found hilarious.
