= Ryuichi Kijima =

Japanese voice actor

- 木島隆一
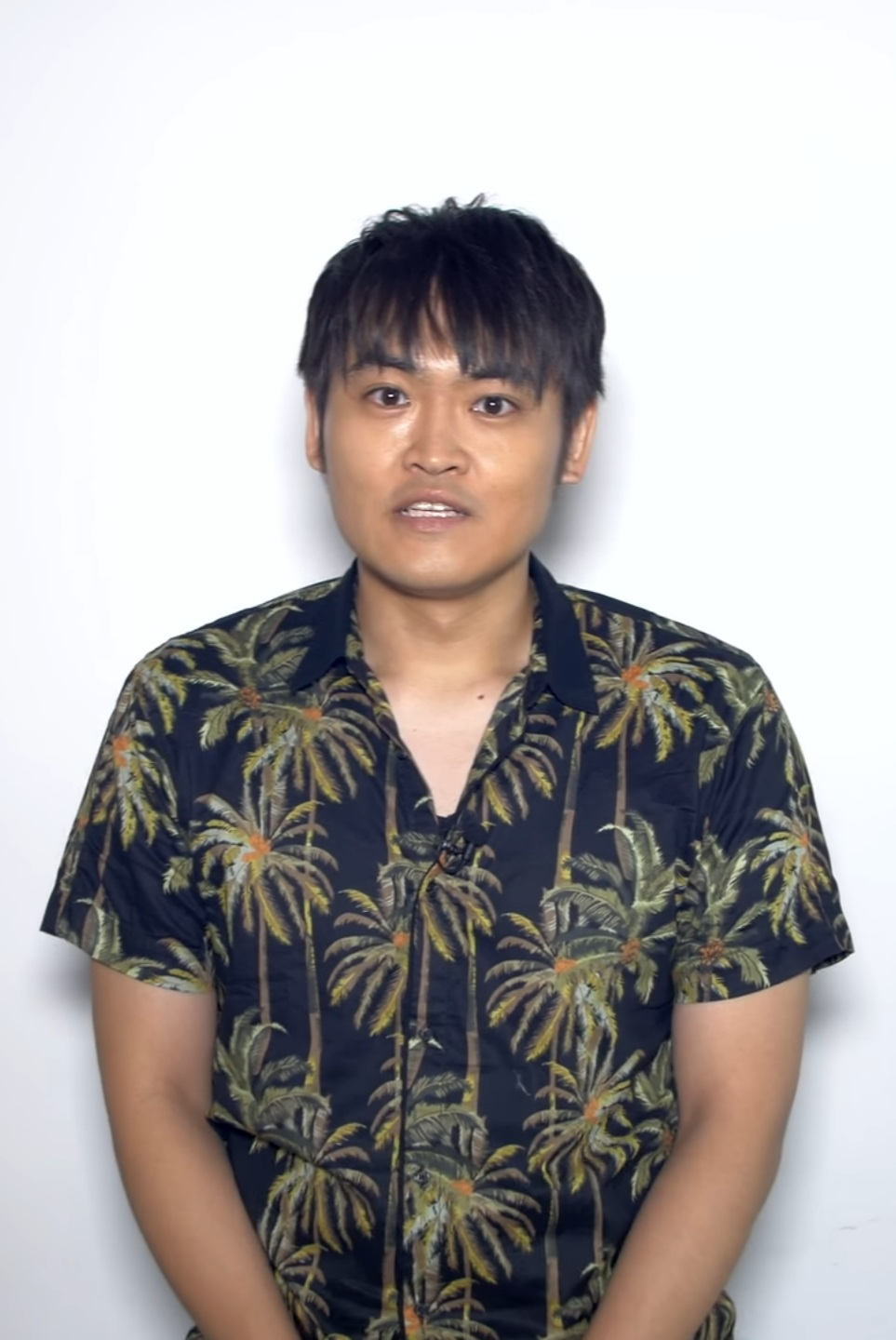
- Kijima in 2018
- Born: March 29, 1985 (age 41); Sapporo, Hokkaido, Japan
- Education: Sapporo Manga, Anime, & Voice Actor Vocational School
- Occupation: Voice actor
- Years active: 2010–present
- Agent: Mausu Promotion
- Notable credits: Hypnosis Mic as Hifumi Izanami; God Eater as Lenka Utsugi; Time Travel Girl as Shun Mizuki; Boruto: Naruto Next Generations as Mitsuki
- Awards: Singing Award at the 13th Seiyu Awards

Ryuichi Kijima (Japanese: 木島隆一, Hepburn: Kijima Ryūichi; born March 29, 1985) is a Japanese voice actor. Some of his noteworthy roles include Hifumi Izanami in Hypnosis Mic, Lenka Utsugi in God Eater, Shun Mizuki in Time Travel Girl, and Mitsuki in Boruto: Naruto Next Generations.

== Biography ==
Kijima was born in Sapporo on March 29. In elementary school, Kijima had a passion for singing and acting in front of his peers. He was also a fan of anime and western films, notably the Gundam series. These passions inspired Kijima to enroll at Sapporo Manga, Anime, & Voice Actor Vocational School. After graduating, Kijima worked in a factory in Tochigi Prefecture for a year to save up money before moving to Tokyo. Later at a drinking party, he met with a former colleague who recommended him to Mausu Promotion. He later joined one of their training centers. After some help from Akio Ōtsuka, he began working as a professional voice actor in 2010. In 2019, Kijima, along with the rest of the cast for Hypnosis Mic: Division Rap Battle, won the singing award at the 13th Seiyu Awards.

== Filmography ==
=== TV series ===
2012

- Beyblade: Shogun Steel as Torimaki B

2013

- Beast Saga as Argyllo
- Naruto Shippūden as Oboro, Fu Yamanaka (child), Daikoku Funeno, Hoheto Hyuga, Yurui, Yukai, Shun, Baru Uchiha, Kinoto, Tatsuma Aburame, Sajin, Koji, Minoichi, Suzaku, Taizo, Taiko Uchiha, Shinbu and Kumo Reincarnated Shinobi

2015

- God Eater as Lenka Utsugi

2016

- The Disastrous Life of Saiki K. as John Komatsu
- Days as Taro Kisaragi
- Cheer Boys!! as Takuya Nabeshima
- Time Travel Girl as Jun Mizuki

2017

- Boruto: Naruto Next Generations as Mitsuki, Log, Aniki and Anaguma

2018

- That Time I Got Reincarnated as a Slime as Gido

2020

- Darwin's Game as Keiichi
- Hypnosis Mic: Division Rap Battle: Rhyme Anima as Hifumi Izanami

2022

- The Genius Prince's Guide to Raising a Nation Out of Debt as Deuterio
- Shenmue as Guizhang Chen

2023

- The Legend of Heroes: Trails of Cold Steel – Northern War as Tack
- I Shall Survive Using Potions! as Fernand
- Hypnosis Mic: Division Rap Battle: Rhyme Anima+ as Hifumi Izanami

2025

- I'm a Noble on the Brink of Ruin, So I Might as Well Try Mastering Magic as Albrevit
- One-Punch Man as One Shotter
- Sakamoto Days as Jay Erk / Kill Baby

=== Original net animation (ONA) ===
2023

- Bastard!! -Heavy Metal, Dark Fantasy- Season 2 as Schen Kerr

=== Films ===
2015

- Boruto: Naruto the Movie as Mitsuki
- The Anthem of the Heart as Ryo Shimizu

2021

- Pompo: The Cinéphile as Alan Gardner

=== Video games ===
2012

- Fire Emblem Awakening as Azur

2014

- Left 4 Dead: Survivors as Yusuke Kudou

2015

- Fire Emblem Fates as Lazward

2016

- Shin Megami Tensei IV: Apocalypse as Manabu
- I Am Setsuna as End

2017

- Fire Emblem Heroes as Lazward
- Nioh as Shinmen Takezo
- Shin Megami Tensei: Strange Journey Redux as Tyler

2018

- Naruto to Boruto: Shinobi Striker as Mitsuki

2026

- Arknights: Endfield as Catcher

2027

- Romancing SaGa 3: Destinies United as Charl

=== Dubbing ===
2019

- I Lost My Body as Naoufel
