= Naruto Shippuden: Ultimate Ninja Storm 4 =

2016 video game

- North American cover art for the regular editions of Naruto Shippuden: Ultimate Ninja Storm 4
- Developer: CyberConnect2
- Publisher: Bandai Namco Entertainment
- Director: Yohei Ishibashi
- Producer: Yuki Nishikawa
- Writer: Shigeaki Fujino
- Composer: Chikayo Fukuda
- Series: Naruto: Ultimate Ninja
- Platforms: PlayStation 4 Xbox One; Windows; Nintendo Switch
- Release: February 4, 2016: PlayStation 4, Xbox One; JP: February 4, 2016; EU: February 5, 2016; NA: February 9, 2016 Windows; WW: February 5, 2016 Nintendo Switch; JP: April 23, 2020; WW: April 24, 2020
- Genre: Fighting
- Modes: Single-player, multiplayer

Naruto Shippuden: Ultimate Ninja Storm 4, known in Japan as Naruto Shippūden: Narutimate Storm 4 (Japanese: NARUTO(ナルト) 疾風伝 ナルティメットストーム 4, Hepburn: Naruto Shippūden: Narutimetto Sutōmu 4), is a fighting game developed by CyberConnect2 and published by Bandai Namco Entertainment for PlayStation 4, Xbox One, and Windows (through Steam) in February 2016. It is the sixth installment and the final main installment of the Naruto: Ultimate Ninja Storm series inspired by Masashi Kishimoto's manga Naruto, and the sequel to the 2013 game Naruto Shippuden: Ultimate Ninja Storm 3 Full Burst. It was also the first Naruto video games released for PlayStation 4 and Xbox One, as well as the first to include Latin American Spanish and Brazilian Portuguese voices in the Western release.

The narrative follows the Leaf Ninja Naruto Uzumaki and the Rogue Ninja Sasuke Uchiha as they participate in a world war between shinobi – the Fourth Shinobi World War – against the terrorist organization Akatsuki and unite to defeat it. Similar to Storm 3, the game uses regular fighting systems; however, players can switch among a team of three fighters who can assist each other. Other returning elements involve boss fights, where quick time events are required to reach hidden scenes and hack and slash areas. The expansion version is entitled Naruto Shippuden: Ultimate Ninja Storm 4 – Road to Boruto; this version, under development, was compiled with three other series titles as Naruto Shippuden: Ultimate Ninja Storm Legacy and released on in August 2017. It adds new characters from the 2015 film, Boruto: Naruto the Movie, and adult versions of the younger fighters.

The game was developed for PlayStation 4 and Xbox One over a two-year period. CyberConnect2 took advantage of the hardware's potential to incorporate more fighting mechanics and add new fighters. The game received generally-positive reviews, according to Metacritic; its narrative and graphics were praised, but critics were also divided about the length of the story and the depth of the controls. A Nintendo Switch port of Naruto Shippuden: Ultimate Ninja Storm 4 – Road to Boruto was released in April 2020. Including Road to Boruto, the game had sold 15 million copies by June 2026, making it one of the best-selling fighting games of all time.

== Gameplay ==
A new addition to the gameplay is the ability to switch characters mid-fight, with the top image showing the duo of Naruto and Sasuke teaming up to defeat the enemy Madara. The bottom is a quick time event, common in the series' boss fights.

Ultimate Ninja Storm 4's gameplay is similar to that of previous games in the series, in which players battle each other in 3D arenas. A returning feature, omitted since the original Ultimate Ninja Storm, is the ability to wall-run; players can battle on the sides (walls) of each arena. A major change to the feature is the ability to have one character on the wall and the other on the field; the second player was originally also moved to the wall to keep the battle flowing and the system in check. Its roster includes 106 fighters from the Naruto universe, including duplicates of the same characters, such as Naruto (Part 1) and Naruto (Six Paths Sage Mode). The game also includes characters from the films The Last: Naruto the Movie (2014) and Boruto: Naruto the Movie (2015).

The option to select one of three fighting types was removed; it was introduced in Naruto Shippuden: Ultimate Ninja Storm Revolution, restoring the rest of the series' strongest attacks, Ultimate Jutsu, and Awakening system, which enhances the fighting capabilities of fighter for a limited time. Another new feature is the ability to swap characters during battle, similar to games such as Marvel vs. Capcom 3. Awakenings and Ultimate Jutsu can be shared by switchable characters; players can build their meter with one character and switch to the other, using the same abilities with the other character (which shares the life bar). Also new to the series is the ability to break weapons and armor in free and boss battles with the ability to inflict elemental damage; fire can burn away clothing, but players can get rid of fire by moving quickly across the area or being attacked with water.

A player can initially play the main story mode following the Fourth Shinobi World War set after the events of Naruto Shippuden: Ultimate Ninja Storm 3 Full Burst, divided into lineal chapters involving the parallel encounters Naruto and Sasuke have until reuniting. Optional chapters focused on the supporting cast's past are also available to play. Similar to previous Storm games, the history mode has boss fights with quick time events and hack and slash elements. Upon completing the mode, the player can travel across an open world to recreate fights from previous series installments. The DLC Road to Boruto also focuses on the same open world but restricted to Hidden Leaf Village with side quests being available upon completing its main narrative.

== Plot ==
=== Story Mode ===
The story begins with a fight to the death battle between the founders of Hidden Leaf Village: Hashirama Senju and Madara Uchiha. Several decades later, the Fourth Great Ninja War is fought by the allied Shinobi forces from the village where Naruto Uzumaki reveals that the villain leading Akatsuki is Obito Uchiha: the presumed-dead best friend of Naruto's mentor, Kakashi Hatake. Obito and his partner, the reanimated Madara, awaken the legendary Ten-Tails to defeat Shinobi forces. The Rogue Ninja Sasuke Uchiha is uncomfortable with his hatred of the Hidden Leaf Village, and has the first four Hokage reanimated to learn about the village's real origin. After realizing that his late older brother Itachi Uchiha and the First Hokage, Hashirama, fought to protect the village regardless of cost, Sasuke's Taka team and the four reanimated Hokage aid Naruto's group.

When Sasuke's forces reach Naruto's group, Obito is overpowered by Kakashi and absorbs the Tailed Beasts to become their vessel. Through their combined forces, Naruto and Sasuke defeat Obito and remove the Tailed Beasts. However, Madara defeats all four Hokage, after reviving himself using the weakened Obito's body controlled by Zetsu. Now using Akatsuki's Sealing Statue, he takes the Tailed Beasts, including Naruto's Nine-Tailed Fox's Yang part, and mortally wounds Sasuke. A reformed Obito and Sakura Haruno try reviving Naruto while Kabuto Yakushi heals Sasuke. The first ever ninja, known as the Sage of the Six Paths, Hagoromo Otsusuki, appears in Naruto and Sasuke's dreams and gives them new powers to defeat Madara. The weakened Madara is betrayed by the true supreme leader of Akatsuki, Black Zetsu, who infuses his chakra to revive Hagomoro's mother, Kaguya Otsutsuki. With the help of Kakashi and Sakura, Naruto and Sasuke seals Kaguya and Black Zetsu; Obito dies in the battle while trying to protect Naruto and Kakashi. Following the final battle, a weakened Madara makes peace with Hashirama and dies as the Hokage return to the afterlife, but not before Fourth Hokage Minato Namikaze wishes Naruto a happy 17th birthday. Naruto and Sasuke have a final fight to decide the village's real fate in the Final Valley, where they fought before. As both suffer the loss of one arm each, Sasuke admits defeat realizing how his terrible actions affected his friends. The game ends with a time skip; Naruto is now the Seventh Hokage raising his hostile son, while Sasuke returns to the village.

After the original story mode is completed, the game unlocks a new story mode set shortly after the war's end and before the time skip. The narrative focuses on Naruto, his friend Shikamaru Nara, and the Hidden Sand Village Leader Gaara. The three ninjas travel around the world with a team to complete missions and remember previous battles (which the player must win).

=== Road to Boruto ===
The downloadable content Road to Boruto is set fifteen years after the Fourth Great Ninja War. The adult Sasuke battles two unknown fighters descendant from Kaguya. Meanwhile, Naruto's son, Boruto Uzumaki, a young Leaf Ninja, trains with Sasuke and Sakura's daughter Sarada Uchiha and Orochimaru's artificial son Mitsuki under Konohamaru Sarutobi. The village is peaceful (thanks to Akatsuki's defeat), but Boruto is annoyed that his father misses his younger sister Himawari Uzumaki's birthday due to having become a busy person due to his hard job as the Leaf's leader, the Hokage. Returning to the village, Sasuke tells Naruto about the two Otsutsuki fighters he met; he meets Boruto for first time, and becomes his new teacher. During a ninja examination to improve rankings, Momoshiki and Kinshiki invade Hidden Leaf Village. Naruto allows himself to be kidnapped by the enemies to protect the village; Sasuke then gathers the other leaders of 5 Kage from other villages and Boruto to rescue him. The mission is successful, and the two Otsutsukis are defeated by the combined forces of Naruto, Sasuke and Boruto. Now in peace and reconciled with his father, Boruto continues doing missions, ending with a friendly spar against him.

== Development ==
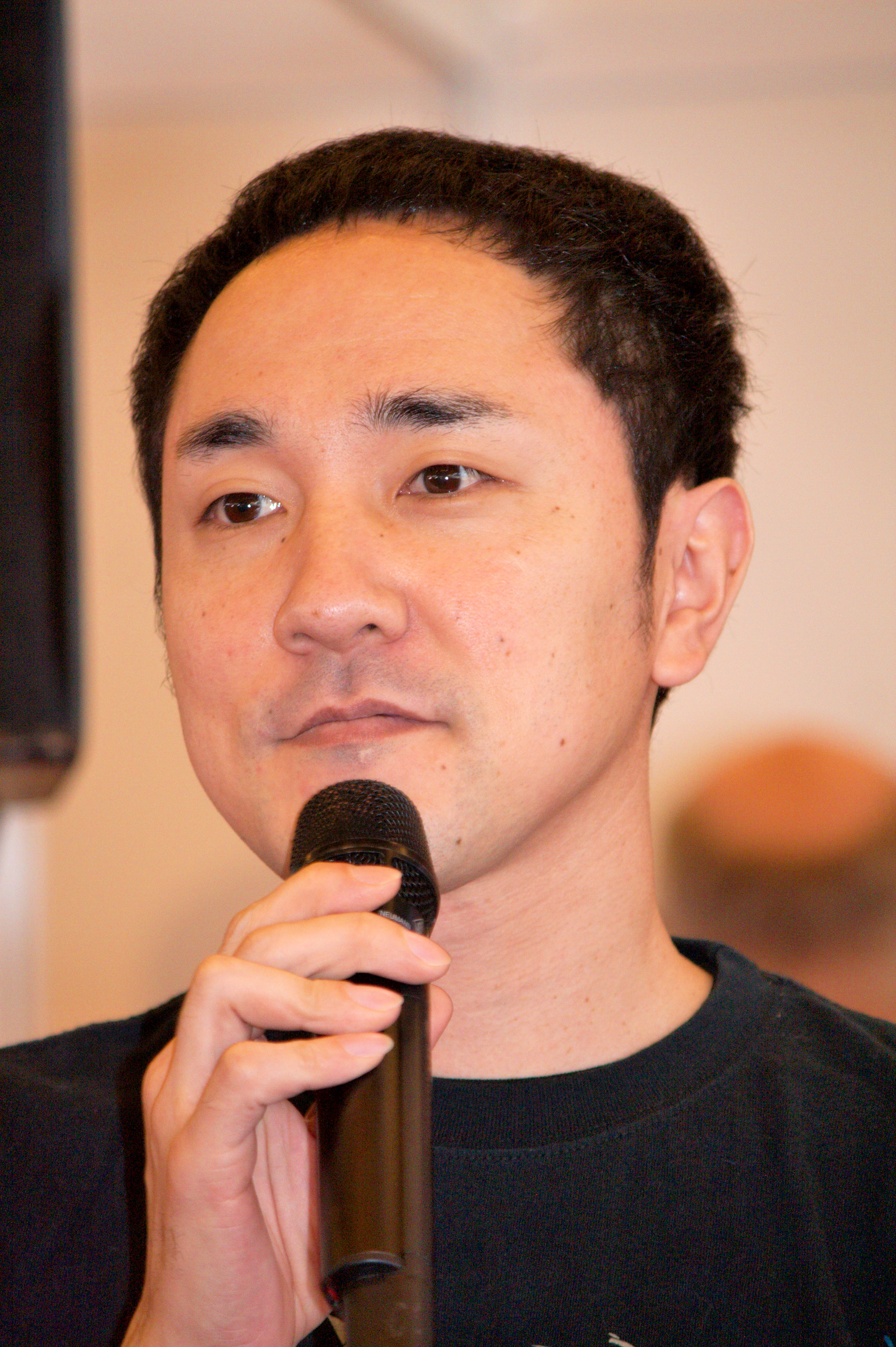
CyberConnect2 CEO Hiroshi Matsuyama oversaw the game's development.

Storm 4 was originally intended to be a PlayStation 3 game, but its development was changed to the next generation of consoles to take advantage of hardware capability. CyberConnect2 CEO Hiroshi Matsuyama conceived the base narrative, beginning with the fight between Hashirama Senju and Madara Uchiha, over an eight-month period. Each character took fourteen months to be developed. According to Matsuyama, the game's budget was higher than previous titles (¥1.4 billion) due to the work needed on each character. Although the previous titles were released for the PlayStation 3 and Xbox 360, Naruto Shippuden: Ultimate Ninja Storm 4 was developed for next-generation consoles as a result of demands by video-game marketers. CyberConnect2 took advantage of the PlayStation 4 and Xbox One hardware to enhance the title's graphics. The team developed the game's narrative to pick up where Storm 3 Full Burst, Storm Generations, and Storm Revolution left off, and included an adventure mode set after the story. Matsuyama gathered a number of developers for Storm 4, hoping that the upgraded hardware would complement the manga, and said that its final volume inspired him to design the game.

Instead of keeping up with secondary characters, CyberConnect2 conceived the Leader System so players could use two independent fighters simultaneously. Matsuyama promised to return to the numbered titles' boss battles because they are popular with fans. Since the manga had finished by the time the game began development, he wanted Storm 4 to have boss fights with visuals surpassing previous installments. Matsuyama cited one boss fight where Naruto Uzumaki, Sasuke Uchiha and Sakura Haruno summon giant animals to combat the Ten-Tails, with Naruto's giant toad Gamakichi "surfing" through the Ten-Tails with a wooden sword. To improve game length, Matsuyama also wanted an online mode. Unique techniques, not present in the manga, were created to fit the pairings which were popular with fans.

Matsuyama wanted to add material from the New Generation Project, which was begun by the series when the manga ended its serialization in 2014. The team listened to suggestions by fans, based on the previous games, to make the battle system easier to work. A mechanic brought from previous games are the walls, where the player can lose a fight by falling from the ring; early in Ultimate Ninja Storm 4's development, the staff debated implementing them in boss fights. When he saw the finished product, Matsuyama was moved by the final fight between Naruto and Sasuke. He sketched the two fighters, intending to put it on the game and promising gamers that they would enjoy the fight.

The hardware enabled a new mechanic in which the player character can receive assistance from another character with fire- or wood-based techniques; the details of each differ. Matsuyama noted that the implementation of running on walls was controversial among the staff; one demo focused on environmental effects, such as smoke and sand. Asked about adding Hanabi Hyuga to the cast, Matsuyama said that it would be her The Last: Naruto the Movie incarnation.

The team researched several types of animation to improve the game's quality. Bleach bypass was used, with reworked lighting to resemble anime; Matsuyama called it a playable anime. The game environment and the characters' facial animations were highly detailed, thanks to the new hardware. Effects were changed as well; a fire burns the victim's clothing, forcing the player to turn off the fire. Although the Shinobi world war is the focus of the story, Matsuyama also wanted the team to prioritize the final battle between Naruto and Sasuke. In early segments of the story, the team used animation from Studio Pierrot's Naruto Shippuden anime; Matsuyama said that the narrative at the beginning of the game was already well done, and the early chapters resemble anime. The team used multiple animation frames for the story mode, and Matsuyama aimed to balance the game's visuals with Pierrot's animation.

== Release and downloadable content ==
Naruto Shippuden: Ultimate Ninja Storm 4 was announced for the PlayStation 4 in December 2014. The game was playable by the public for the first time at Gamescom 2015. Originally planned for fall 2015, it was announced in August of that year that the game would be delayed until February 2016 to make it more authentic and up-to-date. The band Kana-Boon played "Spiral" (スパイラル, Supairaru), its opening theme. A demo version was playable at the 2015 Jump Festa.

Road to Boruto, an expansion with elements from Boruto: Naruto the Movie, was released on February 3, 2017; Bandai Namco Entertainment decided to end the Ultimate Ninja Storm series with it. In the patch, new versions of Naruto and Sasuke were added to a new cast: Boruto Uzumaki, Sarada Uchiha and Mitsuki. When Storm 4's development was finished, CyberConnect2 began work on DLC in response to the favorable response to Boruto: Naruto the Movie. The team surveyed players about what they wanted to play in the game, and most responses involved Boruto Uzumaki's generation. Matsuyama thought that Boruto's main story would take three or four hours, and side stories were created to increase game length. Although this DLC was intended as the Storm series' final chapter, other DLC (side stories focused on Gaara and Shikamaru Nara) was released in March 2016. Additional DLC was "Virtual Reality", in which Boruto can fight strong bosses.

A patch for the PC version, giving the game a 60-FPS frame rate, was released in February 2017. A Nintendo Switch port and a Next Generations DLC pack for all platforms, with new playable characters and costumes from the Boruto: Naruto Next Generations anime series, were announced in December 2019 and released in April 2020. The pack included Kinshiki and Momoshiki Ōtsutsuki as playable characters and adult skins from other supporting characters. Matsuyama said that porting the game to Switch was Bandai's decision, rather than his, until CyberConnect2 approved it.

== Reception ==
Reception

Aggregate score
Aggregator	Score
Metacritic	PS4: 79/100; XONE: 80/100; NS: 79/100

Review scores
Publication	Score
Destructoid	8/10
Eurogamer	NS: 8/10
GameRevolution	4.5/5
GameSpot	7/10
Hardcore Gamer	3/5
HobbyConsolas	PS4: 88/100; NS: 80
IGN	5.5/10
MeriStation	NS: 7.5/10
Nintendo Life	NS: 8/10
The Escapist	9/10
Atomix	(Road to Boruto) 78/100
PlayStation Universe	(Road to Boruto) 6.5/10
Jeaxtu	(Road to Boruto) 15/20

=== Sales ===
Storm 4 sold a chart-topping 64,446 copies in Japan for the PlayStation 4, exceeding the launch sales of the first two Storm games but failing to reach those of Storm 3. According to the Siliconera website, the lower sales may have been related to Storm 4's release after the manga ended its serialization (unlike the previous games). A Bandai Namco press release reported in February 2016 that Storm 4 had shipped 1,334,000 copies worldwide: 80,000 in Japan, 84,000 elsewhere in Asia, 550,000 in Europe, and 620,000 in North America. VentureBeat found it as one of the top-selling fighting games during its release rivaled only by Capcom's Street Fighter V. In June 2016, TV Tokyo announced that the game had sold over 1.5 million copies worldwide. On September 12 of that year, Bandai Namco Entertainment announced that Storm 4 had shipped two million copies.

The expansion Road to Boruto sold 9,204 units in Japan which was considered as a strong number by Siliconera due it being DLC. In November 2017, it was announced that the combined shipments of the original game, Road to Boruto and digital sales had reached three million copies. During a live stream CyberConnect2 announced that Storm 4 including Road to Boruto had sold 5.8 million copies by March 2020. As of December 2021, the game has sold over 8.7 million copies worldwide. As of December 2022, the game has sold over 11.88 million copies worldwide, making it one of the best-selling fighting games of all time.

=== Critical response ===
The PlayStation 4 game has a score of 79/100 on Metacritic and the Xbox One game has a score of 80/100, indicating positive reviews. GameSpot praised its visuals, character designs and narrative. HobbyConsolas praised the narrative's multiple twists and the game's visuals. A Destructoid reviewer enjoyed the "extravagant" combat and visuals. He praised the story mode for explaining ambiguities from the original series (such as the origin of Kakashi's Sharingan eye technique), but felt that the cutscenes lacked balance with the shorter fights. An IGN reviewer criticized the game's short campaign and poor presentation in the early chapters (due to the use of frames rather than CGI scenes), but found the climax and Naruto's final fights more interesting. GameRevolution said that thanks to multiple storylines (most notably Sasuke Uchiha's and Obito's), the player could see the narrative from different points of view. This enriched the main story, making it enjoyable for returning fans or players new to the series. The number of cutscenes from the main campaign was also well received.

About gameplay, GameSpot found its fighting system too simple and geared to fans of the series rather than fighting games in general. An IGN reviewer criticized the game's poor AI and connection problems, but enjoyed the fighting system. According to Hardcore Gamer, it had "solid controls and an outstanding roster of characters". The Escapist rated the game nine out of ten, praising its gameplay and narrative. A Hobby Consolas reviewer praised the amount of CyberConnect2 content, citing the open world after the main campaign (since players could revisit fights from previous games); unlike IGN, he found the AI more challenging. The reviewer also praised the new tag-team system (for adding strategy to the combat) and the detail in the fighters' clothing. A GameRevolution review said that despite the simple controls in the cast, each major boss fight was appealing in visuals and speed; the use of assistant characters in fights was also praised.

Road to Boruto has a 70 on Metacritic for the PlayStation 4 version, indicating "mixed or average reviews", and 77 for the Xbox One version, indicating "generally favorable reviews". Jeaxtu considered Road to Boruto a satisfying conclusion to the Naruto series (based on the new characters), but found it too short. PlayStation Universe agreed, saying that the new narrative was interesting but Road to Boruto was too short. An Atomix reviewer felt that the new adventure mode completed Storm 4's narrative, since events from the original Naruto series and Boruto: Naruto the Movie were explained. Criticizing the lack of new gameplay, the reviewer praised the new cast and the adult versions of Naruto and Sasuke.

The Nintendo Switch port of the game has a score of 79 on Metacritic, indicating favorable reviews. Eurogamer praised the amount of game content; completing the campaign and the DLC could take 35 hours. Nintendo Life enjoyed the cast and the game's responsive controls, but questioned the addition of quick-time events and the presentation. Hobby Consolas found the controls improved and regarded its visuals as superior to the previous Storm games, but felt that it did not take advantage of the Switch's full capacity. A Meristation review said that although the Switch port retained good combat and narrative, the graphics were worse than the original and not enough characters were playable.

=== Legacy ===
The final fight between Sasuke and Naruto was considered one of the Pierrot staff's greatest challenges, and it took a month to adapt it from the manga. Pierrot received assistance from CyberConnect2 in the making of it. Although Matsuyama received a number of requests in 2019 from fans to develop another Storm game, he said that it was the final game of the series. He said that Bandai Visual would decide if a new series of games, focused on Boruto Uzumaki, should be developed.
