= Kujira =

Japanese voice actress (born 1960)

- くじら
- Born: Wakako Matsumoto (松本 和香子); April 1, 1960 (age 66); Tokyo, Japan
- Occupation: Voice actress
- Agent: 81 Produce
- Notable credit(s): Gintama as Otose; Naruto as Orochimaru; Mushoku Tensei: Jobless Reincarnation as Human God; Danganronpa as Sakura Ogami; You're Under Arrest as the Scooter Lady
- Spouse: 1 (m. 2011)

Wakako Matsumoto (松本 和香子, Matsumoto Wakako; born April 1, 1960), better known by her stage name Kujira (くじら, Kujira), is a Japanese voice actress from Tokyo. She is affiliated with 81 Produce. Her best-known roles as a voice actress include Otose in Gintama, Orochimaru in Naruto, the Human God in Mushoku Tensei: Jobless Reincarnation, Sakura Ogami in Danganronpa, and the Scooter Lady in the You're Under Arrest series.

== Filmography ==
=== Anime ===
List of voice performances in anime
Year	Title	Role	Notes	Source
1991	City Hunter	Kazama Toru	From City Hunter 3rd Season Episode 3	
1992	Cooking Papa	Katsuyo Yoshioka		
1995	Romeo no Aoi Sora	Embelino, Faustino		
1995	Wedding Peach	Nan Ma		
1996	You're Under Arrest	50 C.C. Old Lady		
1997	GeGeGe no Kitaro: Obake Naitā	Jun	Movie from 4th TV series 1996	
1997	Great Detective Conan	Heihachirō Shiotataira's wife, Tokomae Sayuri		
1997	Flame of Recca	Domon's mother		
1997	Yume no Crayon Oukoku	Otora-san		
1997	Cho Mashin Hero Wataru	Kanpun		
1998	Record of Lodoss War: Chronicles of the Heroic Knight	Smeddy		
1998	Fancy Lala	Bulldog Iwata		
1998	Alice SOS	Ottoto princess		
1999	Dai-Guard	Muto		
2000	Gatekeepers	Aunt		
2000	Ceres, Celestial Legend	Kyū Oda / Mrs. Q		
2000	Trotting Hamtaro	Tonkichi		
2000–	Vandread	Butan	Also Second Stage	
2000	Dotto! Koni-chan	Koni	Lead role	
2001	Beyblade	Nobuo		
2001	You're Under Arrest Second Season	50 C.C. Old Lady		
2001	I My Me! Strawberry Eggs	Ruru Sanjō		
2001	Magical Nyan Nyan Taruto	Sabure		
2001	Cowboy Bebop: The Movie	Aunt	film	
2002	Full Metal Panic!	Goldberry		
2002	A Tree of Palme	Unkempt		
2002	Daigunder	Silver		
2002	Mao-chan	Mikan Queen		
2002	Petite Princess Yucie	Old woman		
2002	Naruto	Orochimaru		
2003	Sonic X	Ella		
2004–06	Kaiketsu Zorori series	Gorgon		
2004	Doraemon: Nobita in the Wan-Nyan Spacetime Odyssey	Gian (child)	film	
2004	Kyo Kara Maoh!	Queen Kumahachi		
2004–05	Sergeant Keroro	Disneyland Yokozuna, Rat Alien	Rat Alien in Season 2 Episode 19	
2004	Tactics	Book Ghost		
2005	Hell Girl	Meiko Shimono		
2005	Black Cat	Madam Freesia		
2005	Mushishi	Mushi		
2005	Minami no Shima no Chīsana Hikōki Bādī	Patrick		
2006	Higurashi no Naku Koro ni	Landlady, Tamae Hōjō		
2006–present	Gintama	Otose	Also feature film and 2015 TV series	
2006	Demashita! Powerpuff Girls Z	Miss Tenjō		
2006	Kekkaishi	Ichigatsu/ shirahago		
2007	Naruto: Shippuden	Orochimaru		
2007	Nagasarete Airantō	Obaba		
2007	Lucky Star	Women in background		
2007	Bamboo Blade	Reimi's Mama		
2007	You're Under Arrest Full Throttle	50 C.C. Old Lady		
2008	Sands of Destruction	Innkeeper's Wife		
2008	Rosario + Vampire Capu2	Komiya's mother		
2008	Kannagi	Kamimori old woman		
2008	Chaos;Head	Katsuko Momose		
2009–present	One Piece	Sweetpea		
2009	Gokyodai Monogatari (Your Siblings Story) ご姉弟物語	Nobuko		
2009	Tamagotchi!	Aunt Chantchi		
2010	Giant Killing	Wife of Goro		
2010–13	The World God Only Knows series	Dokuro Skull		
2011	Battle Girls: Time Paradox	Oda Nobusada		
2011	Sket Dance	Himiko Minakami		
2011	Tales of Symphonia: The Animation The United World Episode	Verius	OVA	
2012	Naruto SD: Rock Lee no Seishun Full-Power Ninden	Orochimaru		
2012	Sengoku Collection	Director		
2012	Shirokuma Cafe	Raccoon		
2012	Doraemon	Majime	2012 special	
2012	Bakuman	Nakai mother	Season 3	
2013	Senran Kagura	Sukeban		
2013–14	Inazuma Eleven GO Galaxy	Shizune Kabata		
2013	Danganronpa: The Animation	Sakura Ogami		
2013	Servant × Service	Various characters		
2013	The Garden of Sinners: Future Gospel	Mifune no Haha	theater	
2013	Yozakura Quartet: Hananouta	Okiku-san		
2014	Hero Bank	Tamako Oi		
2014	Barakamon	Punch		
2015	Re-Kan!	Ero-neko		
2015	Osomatsu-san	Matsuyo Matsuno		
2016	Haven't You Heard? I'm Sakamoto	Shigemi Kubota		
2018	Pop Team Epic	Popuko		
2019	Cannon Busters	Mama Hitch		
2020	Great Pretender	Kim Si Won		
2021	Beastars	Rokume	Season 2	
2021	Mushoku Tensei: Jobless Reincarnation	Human God (Note: 人神, Hito-gami)		
2022	Mamekichi Mameko NEET no Nichijō	Mother Kichi		
2023	Hyakushō Kizoku	Okan		
2023	I Got a Cheat Skill in Another World and Became Unrivaled in the Real World, Too	President		
2023	Dark Gathering	Kishimojin		
2023	The 100 Girlfriends Who Really, Really, Really, Really, Really Love You	Vice Principal An Baba		
2024	Pon no Michi	Beta		
2024	Suicide Squad Isekai	Amanda Waller		
2024	Astro Note	Obaa-chan		
2025	Ishura	Kiyazuna the Axle	Season 2	
2025	Blue Miburo	Hebi		
2026	Dandelion	Inomata	ONA	
2026	The Ghost in the Shell	School-Master		
2026	My Stepmother and Stepsisters Aren't Wicked	Teru Kōnokura		
2026	Jaadugar: A Witch in Mongolia	Boraqchin		

=== Video games ===
List of voice performances in video games
Year	Title	Role	Notes	Source
2002	Kingdom Hearts	Ursula		
2003–present	Naruto series	Orochimaru		
2004	Ratchet & Clank: Up Your Arsenal	Helga		
2004	Kingdom Hearts: Chain of Memories	Ursula	Also Re	
2005	Shadow Hearts: From the New World	Mao		
2005	Kingdom Hearts II	Ursula	Also Final Mix,	
2008	Chaos;Head series	Katsuko Momose	Also Noah	
2008	Tales of Symphonia: Dawn of the New World	Verius		
2009	Tales of Vesperia	Belius	PS3	
2009	The Lucky Star: Net Idol Meister	Cherry	PSP	
2010	Danganronpa: Trigger Happy Havoc	Sakura Ogami		
2010	Lucky Star Ryouou Gakuen Outousai	Woman A, Female narrator	PS2	
2012	Kingdom Hearts 3D: Dream Drop Distance	Ursula		
2014	Granblue Fantasy	Nene		
2019	Ys IX: Monstrum Nox	Margot		
2025	Rusty Rabbit	Soma		

=== Overseas dubbing ===
List of dub performances in overseas productions
Title	Role	Notes	Source
The Angry Birds Movie 2	Zeta		
Another Stakeout			
CSI: Crime Scene Investigation	Jackie	Voice dub for Romy Rosemont	
Doug	Tippy Dink	Animation	
Friends	Helena Handbasket	Voice dub for Kathleen Turner	
Ghostbusters	Patty Tolan	Voice dub for Leslie Jones	
Goat	Florence Everson	Animation	
The Platform	Imoguiri	Voice dub for Antonia San Juan	
Rocko's Modern Life	Bev Bighead, Gib Hootsen	Animation	
The Little Mermaid	Ursula		
Sing	Meena's Mother	Animation	
Spell	Ms. Eloise	Voice dub for Loretta Devine	
The Suite Life of Zack & Cody			

=== Tokusatsu ===
Tokusatsu on TV
Year	Title	Role	Notes	Source
2001	Kamen Rider Agito	Kaze no El (Voice)		Kamen Rider Encyclopedia (WEB)
2024	Bakuage Sentai Boonboomger	Cannonborg (Voice)		

Tokusatsu Movies
Year	Title	Role	Notes	Source
