= Sarada Uchiha =

Fictional character from Boruto

- Naruto, Boruto: Naruto Next Generations character
- Sarada in Boruto: Two Blue Vortex
- First appearance: Naruto chapter 700: Naruto Uzumaki!! (2014)
- Created by: Masashi Kishimoto
- Voiced by: Japanese; Kokoro Kikuchi; English; Laura Bailey (Naruto Shippuden: Ultimate Ninja Storm 4 Pre-order DLC and Naruto to Boruto: Shinobi Striker); Cherami Leigh (Boruto: Naruto the Movie, Boruto: Naruto Next Generations and Naruto x Boruto: Ultimate Ninja Storm Connections)

In-universe information
- Family: Sasuke Uchiha (father); Sakura Haruno (mother)
- Relatives: Itachi Uchiha (paternal uncle, deceased)
- Ninja rank: Genin (Manga), Chunin (Anime)
- Ninja team: Team Konohamaru (Team 7)

Sarada Uchiha (Japanese: うちは サラダ, Hepburn: Uchiha Sarada) is a fictional character in the Naruto manga by Masashi Kishimoto. Introduced in the last chapter of the manga, she becomes the heroine of the spin-off Naruto: The Seventh Hokage and the Scarlet Spring (2015). A young ninja in training, Sarada is the daughter of Sasuke and Sakura Uchiha.

Her character is first explored in the film Boruto: Naruto the Movie (2015), where she has become a low-ranking ninja (Genin) from the village of Konohagakure and dreams of becoming its leader, the Hokage. Sarada also appears as a main character in Ukyō Kodachi's manga series Boruto: Naruto Next Generations (2016) and its anime adaptation, which show her interactions with her family and with her future teammates, Boruto Uzumaki and Mitsuki, along with whom she is led by Konohamaru Sarutobi.

Kishimoto felt pressure when he created Sarada because he thought he lacked experience in drawing female characters. Kishimoto also wanted to convey Sarada's relationship with her parents across her spin-off manga. Critical reception to Sarada has been positive. Her interactions with Boruto and Sasuke as well as how she aims to become the Hokage based on her character arc have been praised.

== Concept and creation ==
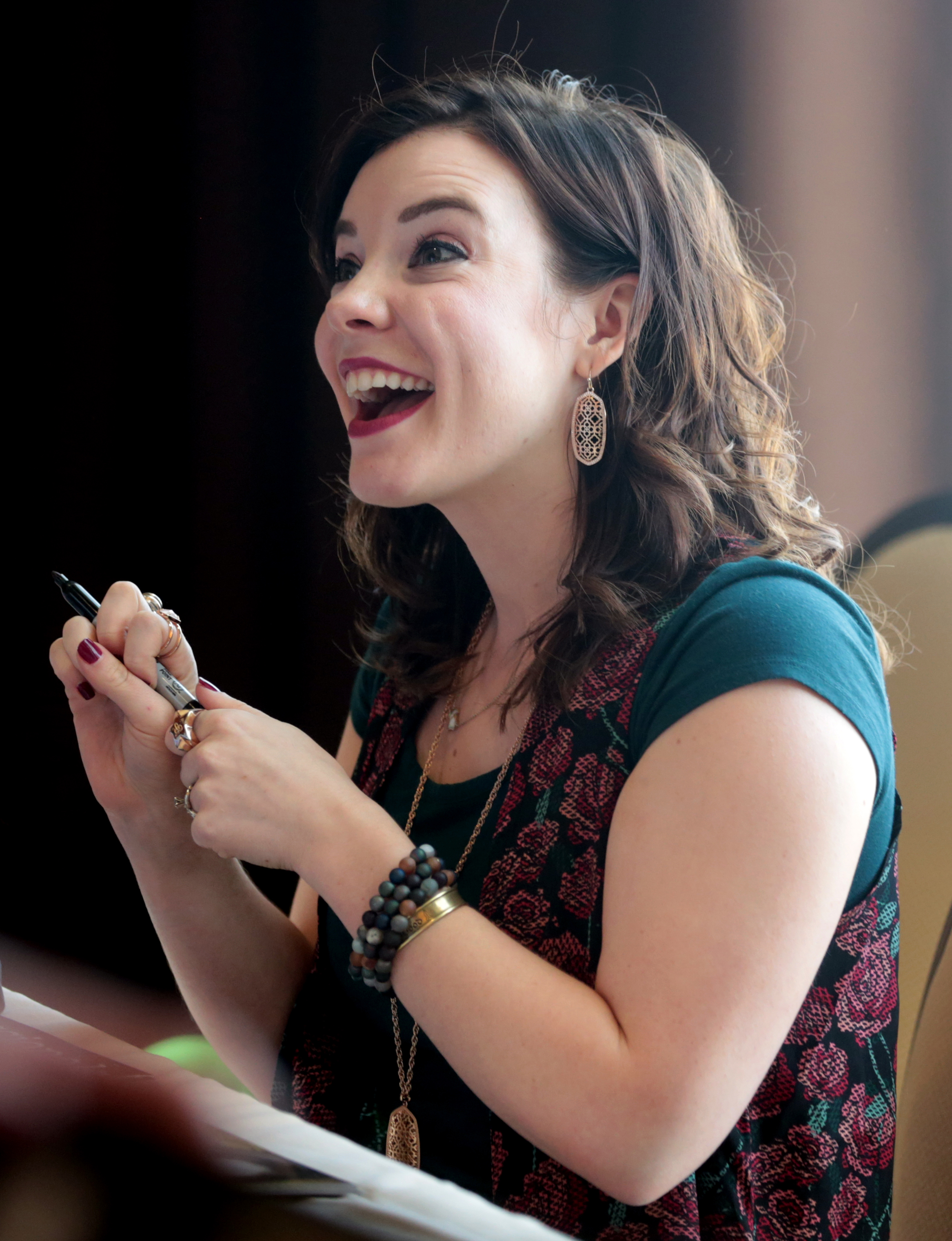
Cherami Leigh and Laura Bailey voiced Sarada in the English dub

Masashi Kishimoto conceived Sarada Uchiha as a character who would not initially be perceived as feminine. He felt pressured when developing Sarada for the Naruto spin-off manga, Naruto: The Seventh Hokage and the Scarlet Spring (2015), as he was worried about how the franchise's primarily male audience would respond to a female lead character. Masashi Kishimoto's brother, Seishi Kishimoto, shared similar concerns. Kishimoto read several unspecified books about women's traits to select the right characteristics for Sarada's personality. In the end, he gave these characteristics instead to another character appearing in the spin-off — Chocho Akimichi. He did this because Sarada's story was dark, and he aimed to balance it with Chocho, who would help keep the story comical and entertaining for readers due to the contrast to Sarada's arc. Another aspect Kishimoto wanted to develop in the series was the bond between Sarada and her mother, Sakura Uchiha. For the finale of the Naruto spin-off, Kishimoto wanted it to end with the focus on Sarada's family.

Kishimoto chose to portray Sarada as slightly dark but strong-hearted rather than cute. He imagined the character as a female version of her father, Sasuke Uchiha. He also incorporated elements from Sakura into Sarada's characterisation and had both female characters wear similar clothing. Kishimoto also said that he aimed to make Sarada cute even while wearing glasses. Sarada was originally going to have long swept hair, but Kishimoto felt it would not fit into her look as a ninja and modified her hairstyle. The author also felt the glasses would make the character look more appealing. Her ninja outfit was based on one of Sakura's from Naruto's first part, but Kishimoto additionally decided to cover Sarada's arms. During the finishing touches in the making of Sarada, Kishimoto made her eyes look like Sasuke's, and her glasses were also meant to hide this resemblance. Japanese rock band Scenarioart in charge of performing the ending theme song of this story arc were given directions by Pierrot to make song show the distant but caring relationship between Sasuke and Sarada. As a result, although the lyrics often mentions the farewells Sasuke and Sarada had, the intention was meant to make it look optimistic as they are destined to meet once again. For Boruto: Two Blue Vortex, the character remembered Boruto all this time and has been sure of his innocence. Sarada was redesigned by Ikemoto by giving her a more masculine black jacket. She wears Boruto's jacket deliberately as a remembrance of Boruto, fearing she might forget her. She even buys the same brand as him.

In the Boruto film and anime series, Boruto: Naruto Next Generations (2017), Kokoro Kikuchi voices Sarada in Japanese. When the new story arc about Sarada's family was announced for Boruto: Naruto Next Generations, Kikuchi said that she expected fans to "feel the strength and energy of the Uchiha family" throughout it, despite feeling nervous about voicing Sarada; she also looked forward to the interactions between Sarada and Chocho, who have completely different personalities. In the English version, Laura Bailey plays her in the video game Naruto Shippuden: Ultimate Ninja Storm 4 (2016), and Cherami Leigh voices her in all subsequent appearances. Leigh stated that she is grateful to voice Sarada. She also said that, while it is exciting to play her, she feels a lot of pressure because of how "legendary" the series is; nonetheless, Leigh and the other Boruto English voice actors felt honoured to play the characters based on the importance of the franchise.

== Appearances ==
=== In Naruto ===
Sarada makes her first appearance in the last chapter of Naruto. She is the daughter of Sasuke and Sakura Uchiha. As the central character of Naruto: The Seventh Hokage and the Scarlet Spring, Sarada searches for her estranged father. She mistakenly feels that Sakura is not her biological mother; after noticing that Karin, a woman who used to be one of Sasuke's allies, wears similar glasses to hers, Sarada believes that she is her real mother. Excited about seeing Sasuke after many years, Sarada gains the bloodline eye technique known as the Sharingan (写輪眼; lit. "Copy Wheel Eye", English manga: "Mirror Wheel Eye") jutsu, which she has inherited from him. However, she does not have a good first impression of her father, wrongly believing he does not care about his family. When the Seventh Hokage Naruto Uzumaki, the leader of Konohagakure, helps her understand that family is not a matter of blood, Sarada realises that she would love Sakura regardless of their blood relation, and she wishes to save and protect her at any cost. It is eventually shown that Sarada has inherited Sakura's natural control over chakra, and thus she is able to gather it in her fists and cause a devastating effect on a target because of her superhuman strength. At the same time, it is highlighted that Sarada has also inherited her mother's "Cha!" (しゃーんなろー! Shānnarō!) verbal tic. Sarada eventually learns from Sakura that she is her real biological mother. After she confirms this, Sasuke says that Sarada's existence shows the connection between him and Sakura. Karin later explains that she was Sakura's midwife when Sasuke and Sakura were travelling together. Before leaving again, Sasuke shows Sarada how much he loves her by giving her the same gesture he once gave Sakura, the forehead poke, and promises to come home soon. Having admired Naruto and his dedication to his village, Sarada makes it her goal to become the next Hokage one day.

=== In Boruto ===
Sarada as designed by Masashi Kishimoto.

Sarada is also a supporting character in the film Boruto: Naruto the Movie (2015), where she appears as a low-ranking ninja (Genin) and forms a team with Boruto Uzumaki, Mitsuki, and their teacher Konohamaru Sarutobi. Sarada, Boruto and Mitsuki participate in the ninja examination to become mid-ranking ninjas, Chunin. After passing the first round, Sarada helps her team win the second round by breaking through a genjutsu with her Sharingan and managing to obtain the flag she has been looking for. In the third round, Sarada uses her Sharingan again but this time combines it with her naturally good chakra control, and she is able to quickly defeat her adversary, Tarui. Despite this, the team fails to pass the final exam. Once the exam is interrupted by two figures known as Momoshiki Otsutsuki and Kinshiki Otsutsuki, Sarada tries to help clear the area, and her father protects her after she is almost crushed by a falling wall. Naruto is captured by the two villains, and Boruto asks Sarada and Mitsuki to protect Konohagakure while he goes with Sasuke to save the missing Hokage. After the mission ends, Sarada asks Boruto if he wants to become the next Hokage, to which he answers that he has decided to follow Sasuke's footsteps instead to become vigilante and protect her once she becomes the Hokage in the future, making Sarada to blush. Sarada also appears in the novelisation of the film by Ukyō Kodachi. During the making of the film Boruto: Naruto the Movie, some scenes involving Sarada's interactions with Boruto were removed because of time constraints. Nevertheless, Kishimoto's most important scene between these two was kept: Boruto motivating Sarada to become the Hokage in the future.

Sarada's Mangekyō Sharingan

Sarada also appears in Kodachi's manga sequel to Naruto, Boruto: Naruto Next Generations (2016). While the manga of Boruto starts with a retelling of the film, the following chapters contain new stories. Konohamaru Team is given a ninja mission, but all three members reject it when Sarada learns that Boruto is protecting somebody from an assassin and saves him along with Mitsuki. The anime adaptation shows Sarada and her friends before becoming ninjas. While being childhood friends, Sarada and Boruto do not get along well but end up becoming closer once Boruto saves Chocho during a competition between students from the ninja academy. The anime also retells the events of Sarada's spin-off manga, where she manages to bond with her father. Similarly, the Boruto: Naruto Next Generations light novels by Kodachi include Sarada's role in the anime. In a later arc, Sarada's group goes on a trip to the Mist Village but ends up trying to stop a rebellion, with Sarada defeating one of the swordsmen leading it. Following this arc, Sarada and her friends become ninjas after passing a test, and she, Boruto, and Mitsuki form the new "Team 7" under the leadership of Konohamaru. In the anime, Mitsuki disappears from the Leaf Village, prompting Sarada and her friends to search for him. Once facing Mitsuki's new allies from the Stone Village, Mitsuki interrupts the battle and takes down Boruto. Sarada is also present in an original video animation where Team Konohamaru is sent to stop an apparent thief.

=== In other media ===
Outside the manga and anime series, Sarada appears in an omake from the manga Sasuke Uchiha's Sharingan Legend (2014), where she spies Boruto's training with Sasuke. She also appears in the ending of the video game Naruto Shippuden: Ultimate Ninja Storm 4 and becomes a playable character in the updated version Road to Boruto (2017). Besides reenacting scenes from the Boruto film, Sarada also appears in the game training with her father at her request. She is also playable in the video game Naruto to Boruto: Shinobi Striker (2018).

== Reception ==
Critical response to Sarada's character has been positive. In a review of the Boruto manga, Amy McNulty of Anime News Network found Sarada's role in Boruto interesting due to her dream of becoming Hokage, to the point of enjoying her more than her mother, Sakura. Christian Chiok of Japanator agreed, stating that Sarada's dream improved her characterization. McNulty said both Sarada and Mitsuki helped maintain a good dynamic with Boruto. Writing about her introduction in the Boruto: Naruto Next Generations anime, Sam Stewart of IGN was disappointed that Sarada did not have much screen time in her debut, as her conflict with Boruto was overshadowed by most of the other students from the ninja academy. Stewart expected that Sarada and Boruto's relationship would be expanded in the future since both are the children of the earlier series' protagonists. Once a Boruto episode focused on Sarada and Boruto's interactions, Stewart was happier with their relationship. He said that Sarada had "become a mix of both Sasuke and Naruto" based on her personality and dreams of becoming Hokage, to the point of finding her more appealing than her friends. Stewart found Sarada's arc one of the best parts of the Boruto anime because of her interactions with her father, Sasuke, which he felt were more realistic than Boruto or Sumire Kakehi's stories. Toon Zone liked the dynamic between Sarada and Boruto because both characters are different from their parents. Chris Homer of The Fandom Post also commented that Sarada is more of a "reserved" character based on her personality. Cherami Leigh's role as Sarada's English voice also received positive responses due to how suitable she was for the role.

Multiple writers have commented on Sarada's relationship with Sasuke. McNulty found Sarada's characterization an interesting contrast to Boruto's due to how both dealt with parenting issues across their arcs. While McNulty disliked the romance between Sasuke and Sakura in the original series because she felt it initially was a one-sided crush on Sakura's part, she thought Sarada's story offered insight into the bond between the two and their relationship with their daughter, which also helped develop Sarada. Chris Zimmerman of DVD Talk stated that Sarada's family issues with Sasuke fit the main theme of the Boruto film: the misrelationship between parents and their children. Zimmerman felt that Sarada's relationship with her father paralleled Naruto's issues with his son in the film. McNulty mentioned that, while Sarada did not detest her father the way Boruto hated his, she still had more admiration for Naruto due to her dream of becoming the next Hokage. Christian Chiok found Sarada's character arc one of the best parts of the Naruto spin-off because she formed a bond with Sasuke. Chris Homer was also one of the reviewers who felt there was a contrast between Sarada and Boruto's arcs, stating that both of them wanted to be like each other's parents. On the other hand, Alexandria Hill of Otaku USA found Sarada's spin-off series disappointing because of her lack of interaction with her father. Before the end of Sarada's arc, McNulty thought that while Sarada still wished to confirm her parentage, seeing her parents interact and show their love for her seemed to have lowered her need for answers. McNulty also pointed out that Sarada's journey fit the themes of identity and family often seen in the series. Ken Iikura of Anime Now praised Sarada's role in the Boruto anime. He said that Sasuke clearly cares deeply for Sarada and that both characters were further developed in the process. Anime Now writer Sarah Nelkin agreed with McNulty, stating that Sarada expands the bond between Sasuke and Sakura, despite him being absent often because of his mission.

Various types of merchandise based on Sarada's image have also been released. Theatergoers of the Boruto film were given two different types of fans, one of which used Sarada and Sasuke's images. In a poll from 2021, Sarada was voted the third best character from Boruto: Naruto Next Generations.

In The Meaning Of Moral Messages In Anime Films Boruto: Naruto The Movie, writers from University of Bengkulu claim that Sarada oversees Boruto's growth, as while she aims to become the next Hokage, she also believes her teammate wishes to become one too. By the final scene of the film, Boruto decides, with a noticeable smile, that he does not want to become Hokage. Instead, he wants to become the ninja who will support Sarada once she achieves her dream. IGN noted that Sarada became popular among cosplayers after her reveal in Two Blue Vortex, particularly due to the work of the cosplayer Plern.
