= Naruto: The Seventh Hokage and the Scarlet Spring =

Japanese manga series

- Japanese cover art for the collected volume

NARUTO(ナルト) 外伝 〜七代目火影と緋色の花つ月〜 (Naruto Gaiden: Nanadaime Hokage to Akairo no Hanatsuzuki)
- Genre: Adventure, fantasy
- Manga
- Written by: Masashi Kishimoto
- Published by: Shueisha
- English publisher: NA: Viz Media
- Imprint: Jump Comics
- Magazine: Weekly Shōnen Jump
- English magazine: NA: Weekly Shonen Jump
- Original run: April 27, 2015 – July 6, 2015
- Volumes: 1
- Anime adaptation
- Boruto: Naruto Next Generations
- icon

Naruto: The Seventh Hokage and the Scarlet Spring (Japanese: NARUTO(ナルト) 外伝 〜七代目火影と緋色の花つ月〜, Hepburn: Naruto Gaiden: Nanadaime Hokage to Akairo no Hanatsuzuki) is a spin-off manga written and illustrated by Masashi Kishimoto. Its plot, set shortly after the epilogue of the Naruto series, focuses on Sarada Uchiha, a young ninja in training from a country called Hinokuni ("Land of Fire"). Sarada is concerned about the identity of her absent father, Sasuke Uchiha, and whether Sakura Uchiha is her birth mother. Sarada goes on a quest to confirm her origins, during which she confronts a group of people who want to kill her father.

Kishimoto developed the manga to further explore Sarada's relationship with her parents as well as Sasuke and Sakura's long-distance marriage. He had difficulty writing Sarada because he was inexperienced in the portrayal of female characters. The manga was a commercial success in Japan and North America, topping the latter's charts in January 2016. Manga and anime journalists praised Sarada's role in the spin-off, her connection with Sasuke, and the artwork. The comic's action scenes drew a mixed response from critics, while the villains were generally received negatively.

== Plot ==
Sarada Uchiha, the daughter of Sasuke Uchiha and Sakura Uchiha, wishes to learn more about her estranged father. She sees Sasuke's former associate Karin in a photo and realizes they wear similar glasses. As a result, Sarada starts questioning if Sakura is her real mother. She follows Konohagakure's leader, the Seventh Hokage Naruto Uzumaki, with the help of her friend Chocho Akimichi; Naruto has arranged to meet Sasuke, who encountered a boy that has the Sharingan (写輪眼; lit. "Copy Wheel Eye", English manga: "Mirror Wheel Eye") — an ability belonging only to the Uchiha clan — and thus sought the village's aid. Shortly after their departure, Sarada and Chocho are confronted by Sasuke's enemy. Naruto saves the girls, forcing the boy to retreat. The Hokage takes the girls with him to Sasuke's location and Sarada awakens her Sharingan at the thought of meeting him. Shortly afterward, the boy's father, Shin Uchiha, faces Naruto and Sasuke and immobilizes both of them. Despite this, he is defeated by Sakura, after which a creature controlled by Shin teleports him and Sakura to his hideout.

To save Sakura, the group seeks information from Orochimaru and learns the boy is one of Shin's clones. After pulling him aside, Sarada persuades Sasuke's former ally Suigetsu Hozuki to perform a DNA test. Suigetsu thinks he has Karin's umbilical cord and compares its DNA with that of Sarada. The samples match, causing Sarada to mistakenly believe Sakura is not her biological mother. After listening to Sarada and Suigetsu's conversation, Naruto calms Sarada by reminding her that only love truly matters, not blood relations. Sarada and Naruto return to Sasuke, who finds Shin's location. Sasuke wins against Shin and saves his wife. Sarada defeats Shin's clones using her naturally precise control over chakra inherited from Sakura, who tells Sarada that she is her real biological mother. Sasuke then states Sarada's existence proves that his and Sakura's feelings are connected. Before leaving Konohagakure, Sasuke pokes Sarada's forehead, much to her joy. In Orochimaru's hideout, Karin reveals that the umbilical cord previously used for the DNA test was the one between Sakura and Sarada, divulging that she was Sakura's midwife when Sasuke and Sakura were traveling together. Because of her admiration for Naruto, Sarada wishes to become the next Hokage.

== Creation and release ==
The final image from the spin-off involving the picture of the Uchiha family was Masashi Kishimoto's biggest focus. It has attracted positive responses.

Masashi Kishimoto said that while creating the manga, he had felt pressure to live up to the expectations established by the Naruto releases. According to Kishimoto, the main theme of the comic is "feelings are connected". One of the biggest difficulties he encountered while making the Naruto spin-off was developing the character Sarada Uchiha; Kishimoto was worried about the way the franchise's primarily male audience would respond to a female lead character. Kishimoto researched the visual traits of women to select the characteristics with which to depict Sarada's personality. He instead gave the characteristics he had read about to Chocho Akimichi, another character who appears in the spin-off, to balance Sarada's dark story. Chocho was intended as comic relief for readers.

Kishimoto wanted to develop the bond between Sarada and her mother, Sakura, and to end the spin-off with the focus on Sarada's family. He originally planned to add flashbacks related to Karin but instead decided to use the remaining pages to emphasize the Uchiha family's bond and depict the moments before Sasuke leaves his wife and daughter. The author thought this would be a more appropriate ending to this spin-off.

The manga was serialized in Shueisha's magazine Weekly Shōnen Jump from April 27 to July 6 in 2015. Its ten chapters were then collected in a single tankōbon on August 4, 2015. Viz Media announced it had licensed the manga to be published online in North America on October 9, 2015, and released the volume on January 5, 2016.

== Adaptation ==
Production company Studio Pierrot has adapted Naruto: The Seventh Hokage and the Scarlet Spring into an animated story arc for the television series Boruto: Naruto Next Generations. The episodes aired between August 9, 2017, and September 6, 2017 (episodes 19–23). The voice actors who played the Uchiha family — Kokoro Kikuchi (Sarada), Noriaki Sugiyama (Sasuke), and Chie Nakamura (Sakura) — enjoyed the development of the characters because they formed a family bond during the story. The series was highly acclaimed by anime and manga reviewers for its portrayal of the Uchihas as an enjoyable-yet-flawed family. Critics also appreciated Sarada and Sasuke's relationship because of the way they form a bond. Japanese rock band Scenarioart in charge of performing the ending theme song of this story arc were given directions by Pierrot to give make song show the distant but caring relationship between Sasuke and Sarada. As a result, although the lyrics often mentions the farewells Sasuke and Sarada had, the intention was meant to make it look optimistic as they are destined to meet once again.

== Reception ==
In its release week, Naruto: The Seventh Hokage and the Scarlet Spring sold 619,964 units in Japan; as of September 2015, its sales reached a total of 956,387 units. In North America, the manga was the top-selling volume during January 2016.

Sarada's characterization and her relationship with her parents were praised by critics. Amy McNulty of Anime News Network gave the manga a score of "B+" due to the use of Sarada as the main character. She said Sarada was engaging because of the traits she inherited from her parents, and she appreciated the further insight into the Uchiha family. McNulty said the author managed to "touch on some universal themes in his depiction of this young girl that truly make her come to life", and that given the rarity of female characters in shōnen manga, it was "refreshing to see one star ... in an action manga and never once become objectified or personify tired stereotypes". Daniel Quesada of Hobby Consolas highly praised Sarada's portrayal because of her doubts about her purpose in life and her relationship with her family, which seemed to overshadow Naruto himself. He also appreciated Chocho's role since she provided comic relief. While praising the characterization of the older characters, Manga News had mixed opinions about Sarada's character due to her angst. Like other reviewers, Christian Chiok of Japanator regarded Sasuke and Sarada's relationship as the best part of the volume.

While critics praised the manga's artwork, the fight scenes received mixed responses and the villains were mostly criticized. Amy McNulty regarded Kishimoto's drawings as appealing. Daniel Quesada said Shin Uchiha was an excuse to introduce an enemy into the story, which focuses more on the Uchiha family than on violence. Besides praising the artwork, reviewers of Internet Bookwatch and School Library Journal enjoyed the way Kishimoto handled the fight scenes while focusing on the main theme — the connections between relatives as seen from Sarada's development. Despite being set after the events of the main Naruto series, The Scarlet Spring has been called fitting for newcomers who have not read previous volumes of the series. A Manga News writer found the villain to be threatening enough, considering the manga consists of only one volume in which the story can be told. Another reviewer from the same website wrote that while the manga did not reach the same quality as Naruto, it still presented entertaining themes such as the coming-of-age of new characters because the previous protagonists are now parents. Like Quesada, Christian Chiok found the villain and the fights disappointing, and he wished the new generation of characters had bigger roles than the adults.
