= Kokoro Kikuchi =

Japanese voice actress (born 1982)

- 菊池 こころ
- Born: November 9, 1982 (age 43); Tokyo, Japan
- Occupation: Voice actress
- Agent: Kenyuu Office

Kokoro Kikuchi (菊池 こころ, Kikuchi Kokoro; born November 9, 1982) is a Japanese voice actress affiliated with Kenyuu Office. She currently plays Sarada Uchiha in Boruto: Naruto Next Generations, and is the current voice actress for Maruko (replacing Tarako), in Chibi Maruko-chan.

== Filmography ==
=== Anime ===
- Bobobo-bo Bo-bobo (2003) (Girlfriend)
- Konjiki no Gash Bell!! (2003)
- Futari wa Pretty Cure (2004)
- Eyeshield 21 (2005) (young Sena Kobayakawa, Haruko)
- Sugar Sugar Rune (2005) (Akira Mikado)
- Air Gear (2006) (Akito/Agito Wanijima)
- Digimon Savers (2006) (Chika Daimon)
- Futari wa Pretty Cure Splash Star (2006) (boy)
- Yu-Gi-Oh! 5D's (2008) (Tenpei Hayano)
- Digimon Universe: Appli Monsters (2016) (Gatchmon)
- Boruto: Naruto Next Generations (2017) (Sarada Uchiha, embroidery shop woman, Yuina Itomaki)
- Chaos;Child (2017) (Yūto Tachibana)
- Magical Girl Special Ops Asuka (2019) (Sacchū)
- One Piece (2020) (Toko, Girl in Fan Letter)
- Insect Land (2022) (Maxime)
- My Daemon (2023) (Anna)
- Chibi Maruko-chan (2024) (Maruko) replacement Tarako Isono (1960–2024)

Unknown date

- HeartCatch PreCure! (Potpourri)

=== Films ===
- HeartCatch PreCure! the Movie: Fashion Show in the Flower Capital...Really?! (2010) (Potpourri)
- Pretty Cure All Stars DX3: Deliver the Future! The Rainbow-Colored Flower That Connects the World (2011) (Potpourri)
- Pretty Cure All Stars New Stage: Friends of the Future (2012) (Potpourri)
- The Last: Naruto the Movie (2014) (Boruto Uzumaki)
- Boruto: Naruto the Movie (2015) (Sarada Uchiha)
- Doraemon: Nobita's Earth Symphony (2024) (Chapekku)

=== Video games ===
- World's End Club (2021) (Chuko)
- God Eater Burst (2010) (Player Character)
- Rockman ZX Advent (2007) the Hedgeroid)

=== Drama CDs ===
- 龍と竜 (Ryū to Ryū) (????)
- 龍と竜 2 (Ryū to Ryū 2) (????)

=== Dubbing roles ===
==== Live-action ====
- Dark Skies (Sam Barrett)
- Twisters (Addy)

==== Animation ====
- Hilda (Hilda)
- Over the Garden Wall (Gregory)
- My Little Pony: Equestria Girls (Starlight Glimmer)
