= Itachi Uchiha =

Fictional character from Naruto

- Naruto character
- Itachi Uchiha by Masashi Kishimoto
- First appearance: Naruto chapter 139: Eulogy...!! (2002)
- Created by: Masashi Kishimoto
- Voiced by: Japanese; Hideo Ishikawa; Yuka Terasaki (young); English; Crispin Freeman; Michelle Ruff (young) Other: Skip Stellrecht (Naruto Episodes 29–30); Doug Erholtz (Naruto: Ninja Council 3); Robbie Daymond (Rock Lee & His Ninja Pals)

In-universe information
- Family: Fugaku Uchiha (father, deceased); Mikoto Uchiha (mother, deceased); Sasuke Uchiha (younger brother)
- Relatives: Sakura Haruno (sister-in-law); Sarada Uchiha (niece)
- Category: Rogue ninja
- Akatsuki Partner: Kisame Hoshigaki (Rogue ninja)

Itachi Uchiha (うちは イタチ, Uchiha Itachi) is a major character and antihero in the Naruto manga and anime series created by Masashi Kishimoto. Itachi is the older brother of Sasuke Uchiha and is responsible for wiping out all the members of their clan, sparing only his younger brother. He appears as an antagonist working with the criminal organization Akatsuki and serves as a primary adversary to Sasuke throughout the series.

During the second part of the manga, Itachi becomes involved in Akatsuki's attacks on ninja possessing tailed-beast creatures until facing Sasuke in a one-on-one battle. Although Itachi perishes during the final duel, it is later revealed that he had been ordered by Konoha leadership to eliminate his clan to prevent a coup d'état, accepting the mission in exchange for Sasuke's safety. He is later resurrected during the Fourth Great Ninja War before his soul finally departs after helping to stop Kabuto Yakushi.

Itachi is a playable character in most of the video games from the series. The character has been popular with readers of the manga and has been positively received by critics, who consider him one of the best characters in the series. His gradual character development and the revelations about his past have received particular praise, and his fights have been noted as among the best in the series. Numerous types of merchandise have been released in Itachi's likeness, including keychains, plush dolls, and figurines.

== Creation and design ==
When Itachi Uchiha is first mentioned by Sasuke Uchiha in the manga, Masashi Kishimoto had not planned out the character's backstory. The only idea he had was to attribute to Itachi some violent action that would have Sasuke wanting to kill him. However, when Itachi was introduced, Kishimoto had the idea to make Itachi Konoha's secret agent who killed his clan under their orders. Itachi was originally conceived as the leader of Konoha's Special Assassination and Tactical Squad called the "Anbu", dubbed the Itachi Squad (イタチ隊, Itachi-tai), which would have been a 70-man group divided into four teams, specializing in assassination and other illicit operations. However, this idea was scrapped in favour of the current Itachi working for the Akatsuki. From all the Akatsuki characters Kishimoto designed, Itachi is his favorite based on his backstory.

Itachi's Japanese voice actor, Hideo Ishikawa, often talked with Sasuke's Japanese voice actor, Noriaki Sugiyama, about their characters. When the two characters first confronted each other, both Ishikawa and Sugiyama found Itachi's massacre of the Uchiha clan hard to believe and started to read the Naruto manga to see if Itachi was hiding something. After Itachi's death, the two actors noted that in the end Itachi served as a good older brother to Sasuke. English voice actor Crispin Freeman was pleased with voicing Itachi regardless of how many times he revisited the series.

== Appearances ==
=== In Naruto ===

Itachi's Sharingan (above) before its transformation to Mangekyo Sharingan (below)

Itachi is a member of the Uchiha Clan and the elder brother of Sasuke Uchiha. He grew up as the child prodigy of the Uchiha clan, establishing milestones for not only Sasuke, but also for future Uchiha to live up to. His early childhood was marred by war, the violence of which caused him to seek peace at any cost. Upon learning that his clan was planning a coup d'état to take control of Konoha, after his clan was accused of attacking the village with the Nine-Tails, Itachi provides Konoha with intelligence on his clan's actions during his two years as a member of the Anbu. Over time, Itachi distances himself from his clan, as some clan members believed he murdered his best friend, Shisui Uchiha, to gain the Mangekyo Sharingan (万華鏡写輪眼, Mangekyo Sharingan; lit. "Kaleidoscope Copy Wheel Eye").

In reality, as Shisui possesses the ability to subliminally manipulate others and shares Itachi's love for the village, he intended to use his gift on the Uchiha clan leader to stop the coup d'état. However, during an ambush, Danzo Shimura stole Shisui's right eye; Shisui escaped, entrusted his remaining left eye to Itachi, and then jumped into the Naka River to commit suicide. When Shisui entrusts Itachi with his remaining eye, Itachi covers up Shisui's death to make it appear it was his doing. Eventually, in return for Danzo's offer to spare his younger brother, Itachi slaughters his entire clan. After creating the misconception that he murdered their family in cold blood to give Sasuke the mindset to become strong enough to kill him once he is capable, Itachi leaves the village, although he warns Danzo not to harm Sasuke. Meeting up with Konoha's Third Hokage, Hiruzen Sarutobi, who promises to do what he can to look after Sasuke, Itachi reveals his intentions to continue to protect the village from the shadows. Soon after perceiving them as a threat to Konoha, Itachi joins the Akatsuki to ensure they do not endanger his village. Itachi becomes good friends with his partner Kisame Hoshigaki, who expresses concern for Itachi's wellbeing.

Itachi debuts in Part I after Hiruzen's death, when he uses his infiltration of Konoha to hunt down Naruto Uzumaki as an excuse to secretly check on Sasuke's wellbeing. After engaging with Kakashi Hatake and some of Konoha's forces, he reveals Akatsuki's goal to gather the Jinchuriki, the people who contain the tailed beasts of which there are nine. Itachi also learns that Naruto is under the protection of Jiraiya and sets up a trap to lure the experienced ninja away to capture the boy. However, as Jiraiya comes to Naruto's aid, Itachi finds himself facing Sasuke and directs his brother back on the path of getting stronger by defeating him before he and Kisame fall back.

In Part II, Itachi uses one of Sasori's informants as a clone of himself to hold off Naruto and the rest of his team while he and the others seal away Shukaku the One Tail. Itachi remains on the sidelines until learning that Sasuke has finally severed his ties to Orochimaru, having absorbed him and now being strong enough to settle matters. Prior to his fight with Sasuke, Itachi meets with Naruto and, after questioning his intentions to save Sasuke, ensures the youth's safety with a crow implanted with Shisui's Sharingan (写輪眼; lit. "Copy Wheel Eye", English manga: "Mirror Wheel Eye") as a countermeasure against Sasuke if he gains his Eternal Mangekyo Sharingan and attempts to attack Konoha. Sasuke ultimately tracks him down and they engage in their final battle, during the course of which he uses his Mangekyo Sharingan to push Sasuke to his limits. In doing so, Orochimaru is drawn out from Sasuke's body, and Itachi seals him away with his Totsuka blade before finally succumbing to his mysterious illness. As his final act, Itachi implants his Amaterasu technique within Sasuke, meant as a protective measure that will kill Tobi in case he ever tries to approach Sasuke and reveal the truth of their clan's slaughter. Unfortunately, having known where Itachi's loyalties truly lie, Tobi survives and reveals the truth of Itachi's actions to Sasuke. This gives Sasuke the resolve to destroy the village in revenge for ruining his brother's and his clan's lives, eventually having his brother's Mangekyo Sharingan implanted in him.

Itachi reappears later during the Fourth Great Ninja War, brought back by Kabuto Yakushi using the Edo Tensei (Impure World Reincarnation Technique), a forbidden summoning jutsu that brings the dead back as immortal corpses, to fight on Tobi's side. Paired with Nagato and forced to fight Naruto and Killer Bee against his will, Itachi learns of his brother's intentions and summons the crow he gave Naruto to regain his free will. After sealing Nagato, Itachi heads out to stop Kabuto and encounters Sasuke, with his younger brother wanting to know the truth once it is over.

After a long battle, Itachi is pushed to use Izanami to trap Kabuto in an eternal time-loop in his own mind to have him release his jutsu. His soul beginning to fade, Itachi uses his Sharingan to project his memories to Sasuke to reveal the full story of the events leading to the Uchiha Clan Massacre. Telling his brother that he does not have to forgive him, Itachi tells Sasuke that he will always love him, no matter what choice he makes from then on. With his brother's parting words, and accepting defeat after his final battle with Naruto, Sasuke renounces destroying the village and devotes himself to protecting it, fulfilling Itachi's wish for his younger brother. Sasuke even adopts Itachi's habit of poking the forehead as a sign of affection, which Sasuke does with his wife Sakura and their daughter Sarada Uchiha.

=== In other media ===
Itachi is present in the sixth Naruto: Shippuden movie, Road to Ninja, where he leads an alternate-universe Akatsuki to help Naruto. He has a brief cameo in one of the original video animations, and is a playable character in nearly all Naruto video games, including the Clash of Ninja series and the Ultimate Ninja series. In some games, he utilizes variations of his techniques not seen in the anime or manga. Several merchandise items based on Itachi have been released, including key chains, plush dolls, and figurines.

== Reception ==
Itachi has ranked high in the Weekly Shonen Jump popularity polls for the series, continuously placing in the top 10. He was ranked in fifth position in the polls of 2011. In the 2023 online global poll, held to celebrate the 20 years of the manga, Itachi was found to be the second most popular character in the franchise, behind only Minato Namikaze. The character received generally positive reviews from several publications for manga, anime, video games, and other related media. IGN reader Jason Van Horn characterized Itachi as "badass" and jokingly mentioned that he is a character to be afraid of since, in his first fight in the series, he does not make any remarkable move. He found that "there is just something about the cold and numb Itachi," that makes the viewer "want to breakout in chills". IGN's Charles White liked the episode where the relationship between young Sasuke and Itachi is revealed, and hoped to see more of their past to resolve the mystery of Itachi's character commenting that learning about their "past has been intriguing". NTT customers voted him as their tenth favorite black haired male anime character. CyberConnect2 CEO Hiroshi Matsuyama referred to Itachi as one of his favorite characters from Naruto.

In the Shelf Life section from Anime News Network (ANN) Bamboo Dong comments that Itachi is one of her favorite characters from the series, noting his background and his introduction as the best parts of the series. Activeanime writer Davey C. Jones celebrated Itachi's fights as the best ones in the series, noting his abilities to be as amazing as a "sci-fi ninja". Holly Ellingwood from the same website agrees, citing his fight against Kakashi Hatake as one "few will be able to forget". The reviewer also praised Itachi's attitude, commenting that he "is as cold and as ruthless as any villain yet".

In a review of Volume 16 of the manga, Deb Aoki from About.com listed Itachi's introduction in the series as one of the cons from the volume. She praised his first fight in the series as very entertaining, meant to "whet readers' appetites for future fights between Konoha ninja and the Akatsuki". James Musgrove commented that Itachi and his partner Kisame "make a dramatic and well-timed entrance into the story". However, Jason Van Horn criticised the first battle between Itachi and Sasuke, as "good" but not "as epic as it should've been". His last fight with Sasuke before dying was considered "epic" by Casey Brienza from ANN. She found it to be "a battle of minds" since, even after Itachi's death, Sasuke changes his mind about him when he learns about his past. She also anticipated the impact of Itachi's past revelations on the future storyline of Naruto. Despite disliking how the anime Shippuden used Itachi's light novel as part of the series, Chris Beveridge from the Fandom Post enjoyed Itachi's impact on both Sasuke and Naruto. Writer Jason Thompson highly praised his visual tortures, due to the effect it has on the victims, reminding him of the antagonist from Kiyoshi Kurosawa's film Cure notable for its horror scenes. Nevertheless, he criticized Itachi's death scene as a result of his disease rather than being killed by Sasuke, taking all the blame from his brother in the process. In 2014, IGN listed him as the fifth best Naruto character when the series ended. Tejal Suhas Bagwe from Dissertation Submitted in Partial Fulfillment for the Degree of Masters of Arts in English describes the usage of god themed techniques within the Uchihas as major references to Japanese mythology especially when awakening the stronger Mangekyo Sharingan. Another reference is how Orochimaru becomes the mythical Yamata-no-Orochi during Sasuke's fight against Itachi who seals Orochimaru through his own Susanoo similar to the myth. The series' final antagonist, Kaguya Otsutsuki, is based on Kaguya Hime. Similar to the references of the Sharingans, Kaguya also references Japanese mythology, with both Sasuke and Naruto being the descendants of her children in a similar fashion to Amaterasu, the powerful Goddess of the Sun, and Susanoo, the God of thunder. The contrasting relations between these two characters is a common theme within the manga, as not only this is explored through Naruto and Sasuke but also through the two other connected ninjas, Hashirama Senju and Madara Uchiha.
