= List of Boruto chapters =

Boruto is a manga series written by Ukyō Kodachi (vol. 1–13) and Masashi Kishimoto (vol. 14–20) and illustrated by Mikio Ikemoto. The first series, Boruto: Naruto Next Generations, was launched in Shueisha's shōnen manga magazine Weekly Shōnen Jump on 9 May 2016. It ran in the magazine until 10 June 2019 and was then transferred to V Jump on 20 July of that same year. The original series' creator, Masashi Kishimoto supervises the manga, which is illustrated by his former chief assistant and written by the co-writer of the Boruto: Naruto the Movie screenplay. In April 2023, it was announced that the manga would enter a hiatus; it resumed on 21 August of the same year, with a second part titled Boruto: Two Blue Vortex.

Viz Media later released the first volume of the manga alongside the English dub of Boruto: Naruto the Movie.

A spin-off manga titled Boruto: Saikyo Dash Generations (BORUTO-ボルト- SAIKYO DASH GENERATIONS), by Kenji Taira, was serialised in Saikyō Jump from 1 April 2017 to 1 April 2021.

== Volume list ==
=== Boruto: Naruto Next Generations ===
No.	Title	Original release date	English release date
1	Uzumaki Boruto!! Uzumaki Boruto!! (うずまきボルト!!)	4 August 2016; 978-4-08-880756-0	4 April 2017; 978-1-4215-9211-4
1. "Uzumaki Boruto!!" (うずまきボルト!!, Uzumaki Boruto!!); 2. "The Training Begins!!" (修業開始!!, Shugyō Kaishi!!); 3. "The Chunin Exam Begins!!" (中忍試験開始!!, Chūnin Shiken Kaishi!!); NARUTO: The Path Lit by the Full Moon (NARUTO−ナルト−外伝 ～満ちた月が照らす道～, Naruto Gaiden: Michita Tsuki ga Terasu Michi)
Years before a fight against an evil man named Kawaki in a ruined Hidden Leaf Village, Boruto Uzumaki remembers his childhood as he describes himself as a child who detests his home as his father, Naruto Uzumaki, the Seventh Hokage and leader of the area has to spend little time with his family due to his job. When Naruto's best friend and former rival, Sasuke Uchiha, returns from to the village to warn him about two dangerous enemies, Boruto requests Sasuke to train him so that he will suprass his father. Sasuke agrees on the condition he performs Naruto's Rasengan technique which Boruto does both on his own as well as technological device. Tempted to impress his father with the upcoming ninja exams to become high ranking Chunin, Boruto enters into the test with his teammates Sarada Uchiha and Mitsuki although he is conflicted to use technological devices. The final chapter is a prequel focused on Mitsuki's origins as a testsubject from a former criminal named Orochimaru who created him. Mitsuki abandons Orochimaru and goes to the Leaf Village to find his own identity.
2	Stupid Old Man!! Kuso Oyaji...!! (クソオヤジ…!!)	2 December 2016; 978-4-08-880827-7	5 September 2017; 978-1-4215-9584-9
4. "Stupid Old Man!!" (クソオヤジ…!!, Kuso Oyaji...!!); 5. "Momoshiki and Kinshiki!!" (モモシキとキンシキ!!, Momoshiki to Kinshiki!!); 6. "Buffoon" (ウスラトンカチ, Usuratonkachi); 7. "Collision...!!" (激突…!!, Gekitotsu...!!)
Boruto's success in the first Chunin examinations attracts his father's attention. In another part of the test, Boruto uses ninja technology which causes him to be disqualified by Naruto. As this happens, the Hidden Leaf is attacked by Sasuke's enemies which whom he identifies as Kinshiki Otsutsuki and Momoshiki Otsutsuki. Fearing the destruction of the village and the deaths of its citizens, Naruto allows himself to be kindapped by the invaders who wish to take the Nine-Tailed Fox Kurama hidden within his body. Following Boruto's recovery, he realizes the error of his ways but is motivated by Sasuke to go on a mission with the other villages' leaders, the Kages, in order to rescue Naruto. As they rescue Naruto, Boruto manages to bond with his father. Sasuke and the Kages overpower Kinshiki who is absorbed by Momoshiki in order to increase his powers.
3	My Story!! Ore no Monogatari...!! (オレの物語…!!)	2 May 2017; 978-4-08-881078-2	6 March 2018; 978-1-4215-9822-2
8. "You'll Need to Do It" (お前がやるんだ, Omae ga Yarun da); 9. "You Remind Me Of..." (まるでお前は, Marude Omae wa); 10. "My Story!!" (オレの物語…!!, Ore no Monogatari...!!); 11. "A New Mission!!" (新たな任務!!, Arata na Ninmu!!)
Naruto and Sasuke team up to overwhelm Momoshiki but the scientist Katasuke makes the enemy recover his power. Weakened, Naruto shares his power with his son so that he can create a Massive Rasengan. With Sasuke's assistance, Boruto manages to kill Momoshiki. Before his death, Momoshiki implants a mysterious seal within Boruto's hand which Sasuke decides to investigate. Following the fight and the exams' cancellation, Boruto decides he will become a vigilante like Sasuke to support his daughter, Sarada, as she wishes to succeed Naruto as the next Hokage. Shortly afterwards, Boruto is given a mission by his father to bodyguard the Fire Feudal Lord's son Tento Madoka.
4	The Value of a Hidden Ace!! Kirifuda no Kachi!! (切り札の価値!!)	2 November 2017; 978-4-08-881227-4	4 September 2018; 978-1-9747-0140-7
12. "Friends!!" (友達…!!, Tomodachi...!!); 13. "The Value of a Hidden Ace!!" (切り札の価値!!, Kirifuda no Kachi!!); 14. "Teamwork!!" (チームワーク…!!, Chīmuwāku...!!); 15. "The Supporting Shadow!!" (支う影…!!, Kau Kage...!!)
Boruto befriends Tento and teaches him the use of shurikens while acting as his bodyguard. As he later overhears that Tento was kidnapped by the Mujina Bandits, Boruto asks Sarada he cannot join on their next mission. Boruto saves Tento from the cannibalistic Shojoji who aimed to take the child's appearance. During their fight, Boruto's chakra is sealed by the mark Momoshiki implanted on him, but Mitsuki and Sarada manage to reach him to defeat Shojoji. As Shojoji is arrested, Sasuke interrogates him, having learned he knows of Boruto's mark. Through the interrogation, Sasuke learns of an organization in search of people with different marks named Kara.
5	Ao; Ao (青)	2 May 2018; 978-4-08-881413-1	5 March 2019; 978-1-9747-0512-2
16. "The Vessel" (器, Utsuwa); 17. "Ao" (青, Ao); 18. "The Hand" (手, Te); 19. "Puppets" (人形, Ningyō)
Naruto and Sasuke inform Boruto of an impending danger and how the team should rely on a new type of ninja technology created by Katasuke. While Boruto is initially against this, Mitsuki convinces his teammate that he should accept it as Sarada already accepted it and that it is his dream to support the next Hokage like the vigilante Sasuke. Boruto, Sarada and Mitsuki bodyguard Katasuke unaware that the group Kara is looking for them thanks to an elder named Ao, an agent working for them. After training with the ninja technology devices, Boruto's team go with Katasuke to find their missing leader, Konohamaru Sarutobi, and their partner Mugino. Although the team manages to reunite with Konohamaru and Mugino, they are cornered by Ao in a cave.
6	Karma; Kāma (楔(カーマ))	4 October 2018; 978-4-08-881656-2	4 June 2019; 978-1-9747-0698-3
20. "Scientific Ninja Tools" (科学忍具, Kagaku Ningu); 21. "How You Use It" (使い方, Tsukaikata); 22. "Fierce Battle Conclusion!" (激闘決着!, Gekitō Ketchaku!); 23. "Karma" (楔(カーマ), Kāma)
Ao overwhelms Konohamaru's team, leading Mugino to sacrifice himself so that the ninjas will escape from the cave. Having learned that Katasuke had been controlled by Kara's members through an illusion technique, Team Konohamaru devise a plan to fight Ao once again. In their second fight against Kara's agent, Team Konohamaru trick Ao into giving him more scientific tools in order to defeat him with Boruto's Rasengan. Following Ao's defeat, Kara's agent Koji Kashin arrives, killing his own agent. Koji battles Konohamaru one-on-one, taking the upperhand. Before Konohamaru is killed, Boruto's seal activates in the form larger mark that absorbs Koji's technique whom he refers as "Karma". As Koji decides to abandon the area, Team Konohamaru return to the village but find a young Kawaki who is also covered by the Karma marks.
7	Kawaki; Kawaki (カワキ)	4 February 2019; 978-4-08-881722-4	5 November 2019; 978-1-9747-0699-0
24. "Kawaki" (カワキ, Kawaki); 25. "Resonance" (共鳴, Kyōmei); 26. "A Present" (贈り物, Okurimono); 27. "Breakdown in Negotiations!!" (交渉決裂…!!, Kōshō Ketsuretsu...!!)
As the former Kara member Kawaki wakes up, Garou from the same group comes to retrieve him, calling him "vessel". Using his Karma power, Kawaki manages to kill his enemy but falls unconscious. Konohamaru decides to take him to the Leaf Village where Naruto decides to take care of him in order to protect him from his enemies. As a result, Boruto and Kawaki start living together, something the two dislike with the former hating how Kawaki destroyed Himawari's favorite flowervase and the latter hating Boruto's complete unwillingness to let him do what he wants and listen to what he wants to say. However, Kawaki decides to tell Uzumaki family his past as he remembers the time when his abusive father sold his son to Jigen who used him as an experiment and bestowed upon Kawaki the Karma.
8	Monsters; Bakemon...!! (怪物(バケモン)…!!)	4 June 2019; 978-4-08-881865-8	7 April 2020; 978-1-9747-0879-6
28. "Flowers" (花, Hana); 29. "Shadow Doppelganger Jutsu" (影分身の術, Kage Bunshin no Jutsu); 30. "Face-to-Face!!" (対峙!!, Taiji!!); 31. "Monsters!!" (怪物(バケモン)…!!, Bakemon...!!)
As Kawaki starts bonding with the Uzumaki family, Kara members Koji and Delta plan to enter into the village to take back their agent, with Koji entering the village undetected but leaving Delta behind. After seeing Boruto and Naruto training, Kawaki decides explain to them how the Karma seal is able to enhance the abilities of their users. Seeing as Kawaki wants to repair Himawari's vase, Boruto and his adoptive brother also start training to master their Karmas, unaware that Koji is watching them. Delta then appears in the area and starts fighting against Naruto to take Kawaki back.
9	Up to You; Omae Shidai (お前次第)	4 October 2019; 978-4-08-882081-1	4 August 2020; 978-1-9747-1702-6
32. "Owed Debts" (義理, Giri); 33. "Exceeding the Limits!!" (限界突破…!!, Genkai Toppa...!!); 34. "Training!!" (修業!!, Shugyō!!); 35. "Up to You" (お前次第, Omae Shidai)
As Delta's body is covered with the ability of absorbing chakra, Naruto manages to defeat her when pushing her usage to the limit. Delta escapes and reunites with Kara and talks with them about Boruto possessing Karma, something they seek. Admiring him more due to the protection he has given him, Kawaki asks Naruto to start training him to become a ninja like Boruto which the Hokage agrees. Meanwhile, Sasuke continues investigating the Kara organization and arriving on a site related to Kara with the coordinates Konoha managed to retrieve from Kara, discovers another Otsutsuki and Ten Tails, the personification of a creature he and Naruto sealed fifteen years ago during the 4th great ninja war. Jigen arrives and absorbs the creatures chakra while Sasuke falls back to warn Naruto, finding the situation too dangerous to engage alone, and heads to find two vessels: Boruto and Kawaki.
10	He's Bad News; Yabai Yarō (ヤバイ野郎)	4 January 2020; 978-4-08-882193-1	2 February 2021; 978-1-9747-1869-6
36. "Surprise Attack" (急襲…!!, Kyūshū...!!); 37. "United Front!!" (共闘!!, Kyōtō!!); 38. "He's Bad News" (ヤバイ野郎, Yabai Yarō); 39. "Proof" (証明, Shōmei)
Boruto's Karma activates as Jigen forcibly activates Kawaki's Karma and teleports into Konoha intent on bringing back his adopted son. Naruto is briefly swiftly overpowered and pinned down as Kawaki is left to face Jigen alone, in the process of which his Karma develops to the point of sprouting a horn, but he swiftly recovers and saves Kawaki. Even as Kawaki surrenders to Jigen, fearing what Jigen could do to Naruto, Jigen, seeing Naruto won't cooperate, teleports Naruto to another dimension and Sasuke arrives. Although the two initially manage to push back Jigen, learning of his ability to shrink objects, once Jigen activates his Karma to the fullest, he decisively overpowers and critically injures the two even when they too use their full power, with Naruto sacrificing himself for Sasuke to barely escape and being sealed away. The fight at the same time also substantially weakens Jigen as Isshiki Otsutsuki, revealed to be possessing Jigen, curses at his weakness and the Kara leader withdraws back to the base and has to rest for 2 days. Koji, deducing this, leaves Konoha to try to kill Jigen. Meanwhile, Konoha's Police Force and Team 7 arrive too late as Kawaki's prosthetic hand breaks off momentarily before functioning once again, proof that Naruto lost to Jigen but is still alive. Kawaki and Boruto open a portal to another dimension and arrive with Team 7 to find Boro, another Inner of Kara, guarding the coffin that Jigen sealed Naruto in.
11	The New Team Seven; Shinsei Dai Nana-han (新生第七班)	13 May 2020; 978-4-08-882290-7	4 May 2021; 978-1-9747-2095-8
40. "The Invisible Jutsu" (見えざる術, Miezaru Jutsu); 41. "The New Team Seven" (新生第七班, Shinsei Dai Nana-han); 42. "Regeneration" (再生, Saisei); 43. "Manifestation!!" (顕現…!!, Kengen…!!)
Boruto's team has problems facing Boro who is able to regenerate his body regardless of techniques that wound him. As Boruto and Kawaki run of chakra, Sarada manages to perform her father's lightning based technique Chidori to take the upperhand and weaken Boro. As the group prepare to take Naruto back to the village, Boro uses his last forces to take them down. Boruto is then possessed by the manifisted Momoshiki who absorbs Naruto's chakra to kill Boro, treating the young ninja as a vessel he needs to take care of. Following Boro's death, Boruto and his friends return to Konohagakure, while Koji arrives in Kara's headquarters to take Jigen down, with Amado being revealed to be on Koji's side.
12	True Identity; Shōtai (正体)	4 September 2020; 978-4-08-882412-3	7 September 2021; 978-1-9747-2277-8
44. "Amado" (アマド, Amado); 45. "Defection" (亡命, Bōmei); 46. "True Identity" (正体, Shōtai); 47. "Predestined Fate" (宿命, Shukumei)
Kara agent Amado comes to the Leaf Village, requesting protection from the Hokage from Jigen in exchange whom he betrayed. Amado reveals the nature of the Karma mark and how both Boruto and Kawaki are destined to be possessed by the Otsutsuki through it. Meanwhile, the real leader of Kara is Isshiki Otsutsuki, who has been possessing Jigen ever since he was betrayed by Kaguya when they came to Earth millennia ago and Karma allows the Otsutsuki clan to resurrect via the host's body. As the discussion continues, Koji Kashin is revealed as another traitor and uses the abilities he inherited from the legendary ninja and Naruto's late master Jiraiya to kill Jigen. However, Isshiki Otsutsuki imperfectly reincarnates through Jigen and defeats Koji. With Kawaki's Karma removed, Isshiki suddenly teleports to the Leaf Village outskirts.
13	Sacrifice; Ikenie (生贄)	4 January 2021; 978-4-08-882537-3	4 January 2022; 978-1-9747-2534-2
48. "Time Limit!!" (タイムリミット…!!, Taimu Rimitto…!!); 49. "Prepared" (覚悟, Kakugo); 50. "Potential Value" (利用価値, Riyō Kachi); 51. "Sacrifice" (生贄, Ikenie)
Isshiki attacks the city in search of Kawaki, hoping to implant him with a new Karma before his imperfect body deteriorates. Meanwhile, the Leaf shinobi order evacuations and devise a strategy with Amado to stall Isshiki until his remaining lifespan runs out. Naruto heads out to meet Isshiki in battle while Boruto tells Sasuke he fears being possessed by Momoshiki and hurtings his comrades; Sasuke vows to stop that from happening, even if he has to kill him. When Sasuke and Boruto arrive, Boruto uses his Karma to transport himself and Isshiki to another dimension, and Sasuke arrives with Naruto moments later. There they sustain serious injuries from Isshiki's assault and Boruto falls unconscious. Naruto and Kurama decide to sacrifice their lives using the Baryon Mode in a last ditch effort to stop him.
14	Legacy; Uketsugu Mono (受け継ぐもの)	30 April 2021; 978-4-08-882645-5	3 May 2022; 978-1-9747-2967-8
52. "Baryon Mode" (重粒子(バリオン)モード, Barion Mōdo); 53. "That's Reality" (これが現実, Kore ga Genjitsu); 54. "Bro" (兄弟, Kyōdai); 55. "Legacy" (受け継ぐもの, Uketsugu Mono)
Naruto overwhelms Isshiki using Baryon Mode and Kurama explains that it will continue to fuse their chakra until one of them dies, but that by linking with Isshiki's chakra it will affect him as well. The technique dramatically shortens Isshiki's lifespan, but he gains the upper hand and realizes that he can sense Kawaki through Naruto's prosthetic arm, opening a portal and dragging him to the battlefield. Sasuke helps Kawaki escape and hide, but when Isshiki tortures and threatens to kill Naruto he decides to reveal himself. Isshiki then attempts to embed a new Karma in Kawaki only for the mark to disappear moments later; as Isshiki's body crumbles, Kawaki reveals that he tricked him using a Shadow Doppelganger and stomps on his remains, killing him. In the aftermath, Momoshiki suddenly takes control of Boruto's body and attacks, destroying Sasuke's Rinnegan in the process. Kawaki and Sasuke struggle to fight back as Momoshiki reveals his plan to kidnap Kawaki and steal Isshiki's Ten Tails. However, Boruto manages to regain control when Kawaki forces Momoshiki to absorb chakra. After the battle Kurama bids farewell to Naruto and dies, with the last of his chakra having been consumed by Baryon Mode. Boruto and Kawaki affirm their brotherly bond and Boruto uses his Karma to return the battered group to Konoha. In Kara's dimension Code is revealed to bear a unique White Karma and is visited by Isshiki's fading spirit, which tells him that while he can't be used as a vessel, he can use his Karma to transform into an Otsutsuki and continue the clan's legacy: devour worlds and evolve until attaining godhood. Code activates his Karma and vows to avenge Isshiki's death.
15	The Right Job for Idiots and Bastards; Baka to Hasami to Kuso Yarō (馬鹿と鋏とクソ野郎)	3 September 2021; 978-4-08-882774-2	4 October 2022; 978-1-9747-3232-6
56. "Code" (コード, Kōdo); 57. "Eida" (エイダ, Eida); 58. "The Right Job for Idiots and Bastards" (馬鹿と鋏とクソ野郎, Baka to Hasami to Kuso Yarō); 59. "Knight" (騎士(ナイト), Naito)
With Isshiki defeated, the leadership of Konoha and the Five Kage move to investigate the remnants of the Kara while covering up the Karma and Momoshiki's rampage, placing Team Seven on indefinite hiatus. Amado supplies the village with intel on the organization, oversees the reconstruction of Kawaki's right arm, and provides Boruto with dangerous Byakugan-suppressing medicine that will slow the progress of his Karma. Kawaki explains what he knows about Code to Boruto and suggests that Boruto might be able to implant Code with his own Karma, as a means to revive should Momoshiki take over his body. Anticipating a confrontation and recognizing that both Naruto and Sasuke have been severely weakened, the new Team Seven resolves to train, though Kawaki grows frustrated with their lack of progress. Amado offers to embed a new Karma in Kawaki in order to let him access Isshiki's latent abilities, but Kawaki refuses and Sumire grows increasingly suspicious of Amado's motives. Meanwhile Code uses his mysterious black bands to infiltrate a compound belonging to Boro's cult and recruits Eida and Daemon, sibling Outers with powerful abilities who were cybernetically enhanced by Amado and marked for extermination by Jigen. Eida possesses the Senrigan, a unique dojutsu that allows her to observe any moment that has occurred during her lifespan, and the ability to charm anyone but Otsutsuki and blood relatives, including Code. Falling under her sway, Code explains that he wants to force Amado to remove his Limiters so he can avenge Isshiki, and Eida agrees to join him, hoping that either Kawaki or Boruto will be able to resist her ability, giving her someone to fall in love with for real.
16	Madness; Kyōki (狂気)	4 January 2022; 978-4-08-882893-0	7 February 2023; 978-1-9747-3472-6
60. "Place to Belong" (居場所, Ibasho); 61. "Madness" (狂気, Kyōki); 62. "Run-in" (邂逅, Kaikō); 63. "Ask No Questions" (問答無用, Mondōmuyō)
Tensions mount as a network of black bands—Code's Claw Marks—is discovered in the village outskirts and elsewhere, which Code can use to instantly travel from one location to another. Sumire pressures Amado for details on his plans, learning that he is preparing an unknown cyborg to help protect the village. Code tests Daemon's ability, which reflects any attack back upon the attacker, and departs for Konoha. Kawaki struggles with guilt for bringing danger to the village, but Naruto accepts him as his son and tells him that Konoha is now his home. That evening the Uzumaki household throws Kawaki a welcoming party and Boruto gifts him his old headband. The next day, Amado warns Shikamaru that Kawaki's attachment to Naruto borders on madness. At nightfall Kawaki reflects on Amado's offer to restore his Karma, then taps into his latent Otsutsuki powers to erase his chakra signature and escape the village. He soon encounters Code in the nearby forest, while Boruto and Naruto realize Kawaki is missing and scramble a search party; Boruto finds that he can somehow still sense Kawaki and gives chase. Kawaki offers up his life to Code in exchange for the safety of the village, but Code refuses, instead intending to capture both Boruto and Kawaki so that he can feed one to Ten Tails and introduce the other to Eida. A battle ensues. Boruto arrives to help Kawaki and the pair is battered by Code, who uses the True Essence of Karma to access the centuries of combat experience dwelling within it, until Boruto likewise activates the power and manifests Momoshiki's Byakugan in his right eye.
17	Rift; Kiretsu (亀裂)	2 May 2022; 978-4-08-883112-1	1 August 2023; 978-1-9747-3662-1
64. "Control" (支配(コントロール), Kontorōru); 65. "Karma Power" (楔(ちから), Chikara); 66. "Do-or-Die" (ヤるかヤラレるか, Yaru ka Yarareru ka); 67. "Rift" (亀裂, Kiretsu)
Boruto harnesses the true essence of Karma and teams up with Kawaki to battle Code. Back in the village, Naruto sets out for the battlefield with Shikamaru. Momoshiki's soul forces Boruto's consciousness and overpowers Code, forcing him to attempt to kidnap Kawaki and retreat. However, when Naruto and Shikamaru arrives, Momoshiki changes his plans and decides to instead team up with Code to kill the Hokage. Kawaki proceeds to battle Momoshiki. Kawaki unleashes Isshiki's abilities and the two clash repeatedly until Boruto begins to regain consciousness, eventually subduing Momoshiki's will long enough to ask Kawaki to kill him. Kawaki attempts to kill Boruto to kill Momoshiki. Code draws Daemon from the Claw Mark on his forehead and reflects the attack, knocking Kawaki unconscious, then flees back to his base. Boruto suddenly awakens and consoles Naruto, and a flashback reveals that Momoshiki used the incomplete Karma to repair Boruto's wound and bring him back to life, sacrificing Momoshiki's ability to reincarnate but ensuring that his soul would not be destroyed as a result of his vessel dying. Code reveals prepares to infiltrate the village.
18	Hindrance; Jamamono (邪魔者)	2 September 2022; 978-4-08-883247-0	5 December 2023; 978-1-9747-4099-4
68. "Scar" (痕, Ato); 69. "Captives" (虜, Toriko); 70. "From The Bottom of My Heart" (心の底から, Kokoro no Soko kara); 71. "Hindrance" (邪魔者, Jamamono)
Back in Konoha, Boruto feels as though he will be able to better channel Momoshiki's power, and reunites with Sarada and Mitsuki, who want to get stronger to help Boruto. Amado is questioned for secretly restoring Kawaki's Karma without permission, and remains under suspicion despite his justifications. Naruto and Shikamaru argue about how to handle Kawaki killing Boruto, with Shikamaru worrying that Kawaki would do anything for Naruto's sake, surmising that nobody in the village would have the power to stop him if he went too far. Naruto vows to continue supporting Kawaki as his son. While Sasuke warns Team 7 that Code could return at any moment, Shikamaru confronts Amado and Code suddenly appears from a Claw Mark planted on his back during the previous encounter. Shikamaru reveals that he was aware of the Claw Mark and set Code up, activating Delta and ordering her to capture Code, revealing that she had been rebuilt by Amado as an ally of the Leaf. Code suddenly brings Eida through one of his Claw Marks and she charms everyone in the room, allowing Code to kidnap Amado before anyone can stop him. Back at Code's base, Code tortures Amado until he releases Code's limiters, then prepares to finish him off. Amado attempts to negotiate with Eida, suggesting she and Daemon defect to the Leaf with him, as that would allow her to meet Kawaki on good terms. When Code attempts to kill Amado anyway, Eida orders Daemon to stop him. Despite Code's newly returned power, he proves no match for Daemon and is easily defeated. He questions whether he truly loves Eida or if she's merely using him, and warns her that he will become an Otsutsuki and decide whether he wants to love her or kill her, then retreats with Bug. Amado tells Eida and Daemon that he'll reveal his true intentions when they reach Konoha. Enraged by his failures and the betrayal of his allies, Code blames Kawaki for his continued misfortune and vows to get revenge by destroying everything he cares about: his friends, the Hokage and Konoha.
19	The Domain of Gods; Kami no Ryōiki (神の領域)	3 February 2023; 978-4-08-883382-8	2 April 2024; 978-1-9747-4336-0
72. "Smaller and More Useful" (小さくて、便利, Chīsakute, Benri); 73. "A Special Mission" (特別な任務, Tokubetsu na Ninmu); 74. "Baptism by Fire" (洗礼, Senrei); 75. "The Domain of Gods" (神の領域, Kami no Ryōiki)
Amado makes contact with Shikamaru, announcing that he's convinced Eida and Daemon to defect to Konoha and they will be making their way back to the village via train. Shikamaru scrambles a meeting with Naruto, Sasuke, and the members of Team 7. While preparing to set out, Boruto promises Hinata that he'll return home. Himawari recognizes her mother's concern and considers becoming a shinobi so she can help her brother. Outside, Momoshiki's spirit appears, revealing that his prophecy is fast approaching and that he intends to use Boruto's despair to completely take over his body. Meanwhile, Code retreats back to the Kara hideout with Bug, where he binds Ten Tails in Claw Marks and begins to tear it apart into smaller pieces, producing an army of blind, bipedal monsters capable of using his Claw Marks to teleport. In the Hokage office Shikamaru outlines Team 7's new mission: they will be sharing a house on the village outskirts with Eida and Daemon in order to keep them under observation and ensure compliance, acting as a first and last line of defense should they make a move against Konoha. When Eida and Daemon arrive in the village they fly straight for the home to meet everyone, and personalities quickly begin to clash. Amado is debriefed, and he explains that Eida's and Daemon's powers are shinjutsu transplanted from the corpse of Shibai Otsutsuki, an Otsutsuki who achieved godhood and transcended to another plane. He defines shinjutsu as divine abilities more powerful than ninjutsu which can only be used by gods, including the Karma. He explains that Delta was a failed clone of his daughter, Akebi, who died of an incurable disease, and that his goal is to use Kawaki as a catalyst to transplant a Karma containing her data onto a new clone, hoping that he will be able to reincarnate her. Momoshiki's spirit appears in Boruto's mind and warns him that Amado might be lying about the nature of Eida's enchantment ability, and at that moment Boruto begins to see glimpses of a battle in the near future, in which his friends and comrades seem to have turned against him.
20	Omnipotence; Zennō (全能)	2 June 2023; 978-4-08-883532-7	6 August 2024; 978-1-9747-4554-8
76. "A Girls' Sanctuary" (女子の聖域, Joshi no Seiiki); 77. "Time Drawing Near" (迫る時, Semaru Toki); 78. "Super Idiot" (大馬鹿野郎, Ōbaka Yarō); 79. "Omnipotence" (全能, Zennō); 80. "What Dad Would Do!" (父ちゃんなら…!, Tōchan nara...!)
Kawaki realizes that Boruto is communicating with Momoshiki's spirit, prompting Kawaki to leave in full rage. Eida and Daemon explores Konoha, with Boruto ordered to tail them. Daemon senses a mysterious intensity from Himawari and tries to attack her, but Boruto intervenes, explaining she is not a ninja. Kawaki goes to the Uzumaki residence and tells Naruto that his failure to kill Boruto means Momoshiki is still a terrific threat. Determined to eliminate the terrible danger, Kawaki declares he wants to kill Boruto once again in order to destroy Momoshiki for good, but Hinata becomes angry and slaps him. Kawaki sends Naruto and Hinata into another dimension, promising to free them once his task of destroy all the Otsutsuki threat is complete. In the ensuing fight, Boruto confronts Kawaki and loses his right eye protecting Sarada. Sasuke arrives to intervene, but Momoshiki possesses Boruto to help Kawaki escape. Kawaki encounters Eida and he wishes that Momoshiki's vessel were a stranger instead of Boruto. Eida unknowingly activates her true power, the Omnipotence, to rewrite everyone's memories: Kawaki and Boruto permanently swapped places, with Kawaki forcing Eida to lie that Boruto has killed Naruto and Hinata. Momoshiki explains the situation to Boruto as his prophetic vision has become true, forcing Boruto to fight and flee against his former comrades. Only Sumire and Sarada are unaffected by the Omnipotence. Sarada, tearfully and awakening her Mangekyō Sharingan, convinces Sasuke of Boruto's innocence. Sasuke rescues Boruto and they escape from Konoha. They briefly encounter Daemon and Eida at the border, where Eida apologizes for her actions and vows not to aid Kawaki in tracking them never again. Momoshiki is very successful in breaking Boruto's spirit once and for all, but Boruto resolves to train hard, uphold the Will of Fire, bring Kawaki back to reason and thus prove his true identity as Boruto Uzumaki to the world.

=== Boruto: Two Blue Vortex ===
No.	Title	Original release date	English release date
1	Boruto; Boruto (ボルト)	February 2, 2024; 978-4-08-883824-3	February 4, 2025; 978-1-9747-4718-4
1. "Boruto" (ボルト); 2. "Tree" (木, Ki); 3. "Uzuhiko (渦彦); 4. "The Awakening" (覚醒, Kakusei)
Three years have passed, Naruto and Hinata are still alive and unconscious in Kawaki's timeless dimension. Sarada fails to convince Shikamaru, now acting as the Eighth Hokage in an unofficial capacity, to lift the execution order on Boruto, who is now hunted as a rogue ninja after being framed for the murder of Naruto and Hinata. Sarada's discussions with Sumire, Eida and Daemon about the Omnipotence has no solution. Kawaki and Mitsuki discuss about Boruto's whereabouts, but Mitsuki begins to question his devotion to Kawaki. Kawaki is called to investigate the Claw Marks detected near the village and realizes too late that some of the shinobi on patrol have been marked. Code's army of Claw Grimes swarms the village, devouring individuals and transforming into trees, leaving them trapped and comatose. Kawaki and the others fight them off, with Sarada facing Code, who states that he has been searching for Boruto for the last two years. When Code threatens Sarada, Boruto suddenly appears over the skies of Konoha and drops down to battle him, easily defeating a number of Claw Grimes and striking Code with his newly developed Uzuhiko Rasengan. This Rasengan utilizes planetary chakra to afflict the target with rotational forces that cause continuous internal damage and vertigo until either they die or Boruto rescinds it. Boruto threatens to kill Code if he doesn't call off his Claw Grimes, warning that tampering with the Ten-Tails could lead to a terrible future. Kawaki attacks Boruto, causing Code to teleport to another dimension, unaware that Boruto left a scout toad on his body. Boruto uses Flying Raijin to pursue in hopes of finding the Ten Tails. Instead, they encounter four new enemies, including one who bears an uncanny resemblance to Sasuke. They claim to be sentient Divine Trees that evolved thanks to Code's Claw Marks. Boruto rescinds Uzuhiko Rasengan and asks Code to help him fight them, but Code flees, and Boruto is forced to escape using Flying Raijin. At the wilderness, Boruto is sitting on a tree while Koji Kashin admonishes him for taking such a risk. Boruto apologizes for failing to rescue Sasuke, who was revealed to be trapped inside a nearby tree.
2	The Whereabouts of the Sun; Taiyō no yukue (太陽の行方)	May 2, 2024; 978-4-08-884073-4	June 3, 2025; 978-1-9747-5502-8
5. "Target" (目標(ターゲット), Tāgetto); 6. "Three Years" (3年, 3 nen); 7. "The Whereabouts of the Sun" (太陽の行方, Taiyō no yukue); 8. "It Doesn't Matter" (どうでもいい話, Dō demo ī hanashi)
Three years have passed since Eida's Omnipotence reversed the fates of Boruto Uzumaki and Kawaki, leading to Boruto being branded the killer of the Seventh Hokage and Boruto's father, Naruto Uzumaki. Boruto, who has been training with Sasuke, returns to the Hidden Leaf Village to confront Code. As Boruto arrives, he reveals a terrifying truth: the Ten-Tails has undergone an unexpected evolution, transforming into sentient Divine Tree beings—powerful individuals with their own consciousness. These new life forms, born from the Claw Grimes, pose a catastrophic new threat to the world. During the escalating chaos, Boruto unveils a new, potent version of his signature technique, Rasengan Uzuhiko. However, his return also brings him face-to-face with his former friend, Mitsuki, who now views Boruto as his greatest enemy and unleashes a ferocious attack. Furthermore, the volume reveals the dire fate of Sasuke, who has been immobilized and encased by one of the Divine Tree beings.
3	Nine Tails; Kyūbi (九尾)	September 4, 2024; 978-4-08-884178-6	October 7, 2025; 978-1-9747-5850-0
9. "Nine Tails" (九尾, Kyūbi); 10. "Kernel" (因子, Inshi); 11. "True Power" (本気, Gachi); 12. "Thorn Soul Bulb" (棘魂, Togedama)
The escalating crisis in the Hidden Leaf Village intensifies as the newly emerged, sentient Divine Tree beings launch a coordinated attack. Two of the clones, Jura and Hidari (the clone possessing Sasuke's chakra), immediately set their sights on Himawari Uzumaki. Jura's motivation is soon revealed: he detects a significant, familiar chakra signature within Himawari—the presence of the Nine-Tailed Fox, Kurama, who has been inexplicably reborn within her. The Konoha ninja struggle to protect Naruto's daughter from the powerful Shinju clones. During the battle, Himawari loses consciousness and meets the spirit of Kurama, who explains the true nature of the Tailed Beasts' rebirth. Accepting this new power, Himawari accesses a Tailed Beast Mode transformation to defend herself against Jura. Meanwhile, Boruto intervenes to rescue his younger sister and he confronts the clone bearing Sasuke's techniques and appearance. The volume explores the nature of these Shinju, revealing that upon defeat, their remains condense into a mysterious Thorn Soul Bulb. The volume concludes with a frantic struggle over these crucial remnants as the conflict spirals into a full-scale battle for survival
4	The Singularity of Fate; Unmei no Tokuiten (運命の特異点)	February 4, 2025; 978-4-08-884361-2	February 3, 2026; 978-1-9747-6156-2
13. "Prescience" (十方, Jippō); 14. "Duty" (務め, Tsutome); 15. "A Vibrant Life" (張りのある人生, Hari no Aru Jinsei); 16. "The Singularity of Fate" (運命の特異点, Unmei no Tokuiten)
The volume opens following the intense battle between the Konoha forces and the sentient Divine Tree beings. Boruto, severely wounded by a long-range projectile attack from Jura, is incapacitated. As his consciousness fades, he is flooded with memories of his time in exile and training with Kashin Koji. These flashbacks reveal Boruto's initial encounter with Koji after fleeing the village, where Koji used a scientific ninja tool and a prophetic new power, Jippō (Prescience), to aid Boruto and teach him vital techniques, all while laying the groundwork for rescuing Sasuke. Meanwhile, the chaos in the Hidden Leaf Village is mirrored elsewhere: the Village Hidden in the Sand is also targeted by the Divine Tree clones. Gaara, the Fifth Kazekage, comes under attack by one of the Shinju, forcing his subordinates, including his adoptive son Shinki, to defend him. Amidst the turmoil, the Konoha ninja capture the injured Boruto. The Eighth Hokage, Shikamaru Nara, subjects Boruto to a rigorous interrogation, desperately trying to discern his true intentions and the terrifying nature of the Shinju threat. Boruto is put in a desperate situation as he must convince Shikamaru, who still believes Boruto killed Naruto of the overwhelming danger the world faces, while also concealing the critical information about the Divine Tree's true motives. The volume heightens the tension surrounding Boruto's status as a fugitive and his race against time to prevent the Shinju from achieving their mysterious goals.
5	Because of Love; Ai yueni (愛ゆえに)	July 4, 2025; 978-4-08-884516-6	May 5, 2026; 978-1-9747-6587-4
17. "Wild Beast Cubs" (猛獣の子供, Mōjū no Kodomo); 18. "Only Babble in Your Sleep" (寝言は寝て言え, Negoto wa Neteie); 19. "Konohamaru-chan" (木ノ葉丸ちゃん); 20. "Because of Love" (愛ゆえに, Ai yueni)
The battle against the Divine Tree beings—the Shinju—is taken to the Hidden Sand Village, where Sarada, Mitsuki, and Konohamaru team up with the Sand shinobi, including Yodo and Araya, to protect Gaara and Shinki. They are pitted against two of the human-Shinju clones: Ryu (the Bug clone) and Matsuri (the Moegi clone).Under the direction of Shikamaru and the intel provided by Kashin Koji, the mission is revealed to be a deadly, calculated gamble. The Konoha ninja are ordered to exploit the Shinju's curious and instinctual "infant-like" nature to lower their guard, creating an opening for a surprise counter-attack to assassinate them.Konohamaru faces the most difficult task: he must betray Matsuri, who exhibits highly unusual and affectionate behavior towards him, hinting that the Shinju's consciousness is struggling with the deeply embedded memories of her human host, Moegi. Konohamaru is put to the ultimate test, forced to compromise his kind nature for the greater good. Meanwhile, in the Hidden Leaf, Kawaki, driven by his single-minded obsession to protect the world by eliminating all Ōtsutsuki threats, confronts Amado. Kawaki demands that the genius scientist remove the final limiters on his Karma, intending to unleash the full, destructive potential of the late Isshiki Ōtsutsuki's power. This act sets the stage for a new devastating level of power in the final conflict.
6	Mangekyo Sharingan; Mangekyō Sharingan (万華鏡写輪眼)	October 3, 2025; 978-4-08-884731-3	October 2, 2026 (scheduled); 978-1-9747-6668-0
21. "Mangekyo Sharingan" (万華鏡写輪眼); 22. "Jura" (ジュラ); 23. "The Strong" (強者, Tsuwamono); 24. "Kawaki Uzumaki" (うずまきカワキ, Uzumaki Kawaki)
The battle against the Shinju clones reaches a breaking point on the battlefield in the Land of Wind. The volume focuses on the dramatic awakenings and confrontations that reshape the war. As her comrades face overwhelming odds, Sarada Uchiha finally activates her Mangekyō Sharingan. Her new ability, named Ōhirume after the Sun Goddess, manifests as a destructive power capable of generating selective space-time distortions, allowing her to warp or absorb enemy attacks and save her teammates. Boruto arrives to assist the struggling Konoha forces, intervening to protect Konohamaru from the relentless Matsuri clone. However, the true threat emerges when the Shinju leader, Jura, makes his move. The stage is set for a monumental clash as Kawaki, now operating with his Karma limiters removed, confronts Jura head-on. Kawaki's display of Isshiki's power is impressive, but Jura proves to be an unprecedented opponent, showing the ability to shatter Kawaki's defensive black cubes—a feat never before seen.With the battle at its peak, the conflict forces Boruto and Kawaki into an uneasy, temporary alliance against the terrifying strength of Jura. Ultimately, the fight leads to a hasty retreat orchestrated by the android Delta, who extracts the vulnerable Konoha ninja. The volume concludes by teasing the Shinju's new focus, with Jura's prophetic power redirecting his attention away from Boruto and toward a new, crucial target: Himawari Uzumaki.
7	New Powers; Aratana Chikara (新たな力)	February 4, 2026; 978-4-08-884838-9	—
25. "Those Girls" (あの子たちに, Ano kotachi ni); 26. "Those Like-Minded" (通ずる物, Tsūzuru Mono); 27. "Bet Your Life On It" (命を賭して, Inochi o Toshite); 28. "New Powers" (新たな力, Aratana Chikara)
8	Dancing with the Devil; Akuma to Odore (悪魔と踊れ)	June 4, 2026; 978-4-08-885076-4	—
29. "Pest Control" (害虫駆除, Gaichūkujo); 30. "All Them Nuisances" (邪魔者共, Jama Monodomo); 31. "Shut Up" (うるさい, Urusai); 32. "Dancing with the Devil" (悪魔と踊れ, Akuma to Odore)
9	Shattering Futures; Kowareru Mirai (壊れる未来)	October 2, 2026; 978-4-08-885208-9	—
33. "Shattering Futures" (壊れる未来, Kowareru Mirai); 34. "Used to It" (もう慣れっこ, Mō Narekko); 35. "Cute" (かわいい, Kawaii); 36. "Parental Love" (親の心, Oya no Kokoro)

== Chapters not yet released in tankōbon format ==
These chapters for Boruto: Two Blue Vortex that have yet to be published in a tankōbon volume. They were originally serialised in Japanese in issues of Shueisha's magazine V Jump and in Manga Plus by Shueisha.

37. "Trust" (あいつを信じて, Aitsu o Shinjite)
38. "Follow Your Heart" (心のままに, Kokoro no Mama ni)
