= Boruto (TV series) =

Japanese anime television series

- Genre: Adventure; Fantasy
- Based on: Boruto by Ukyō Kodachi and Mikio Ikemoto
- Developed by: Ukyō Kodachi (#1–216) (Note: Story Supervisor (ストーリー監修)); Makoto Uezu (#1–66); Masaya Honda (#67–293); Kō Shigenobu (#261–273)
- Directed by: Noriyuki Abe (#1–104, (Note: Chief Director (総監督)) #282–286); Hiroyuki Yamashita (#1–66); Toshirō Fujii (#67–104); Masayuki Kōda (#105–281, #287–293)
- Voices of: Yūko Sanpei; Kokoro Kikuchi; Ryuichi Kijima; Hidenori Takahashi; Yuma Uchida
- Music by: Yasuharu Takanashi; Yaiba
- Country of origin: Japan
- Original language: Japanese
- No. of episodes: 293 (list of episodes)

Production
- Producers: Makoto Hijikata; Kōichi Machiyama
- Cinematography: Mai Masuno; Nobuo Kimura
- Editors: Seiji Morita; Yumika Okazaki; Naoki Miyazaki (#1–104); Yukie Oikawa (#105–126)
- Running time: 24 minutes
- Production companies: TV Tokyo; Pierrot

Original release
- Network: TXN (TV Tokyo)
- Release: 5 April 2017 – 26 March 2023

Related
- Boruto: Naruto the Movie

Boruto: Naruto Next Generations (Note: Japanese: BORUTO(ボルト) -NARUTO NEXT GENERATIONS-) is a Japanese anime television series based on the manga series Boruto by Ukyō Kodachi and Mikio Ikemoto and supervised by Masashi Kishimoto. It is a spin-off and a sequel to the anime series Naruto (2002–2007) and Naruto: Shippuden (2007–2017). The series follows the exploits of Naruto Uzumaki's son Boruto and his ninja team. It was produced by Pierrot and aired for 293 episodes on TV Tokyo from April 2017 to March 2023; a second part was announced to be in development. Unlike the manga, which began as a retelling of Boruto: Naruto the Movie (2015), the anime begins as a prequel set before Boruto and his friends become ninjas in a later story arc.

== Plot ==
Many years following the end of the Fourth Great Ninja War, the village of Konoha is thriving under the Seventh Hokage, Naruto Uzumaki. He is married to Hinata Hyuga and has two children, Boruto and Himawari. Boruto feels resentful over his father's absence, due to his duties. Hoping to gain Naruto's approval, he enters Konoha's Ninja Academy and upon graduating, forms a ninja team as a Genin along with Sarada Uchiha and Mitsuki, led by their Jōnin teacher and Naruto's protégé, Konohamaru Sarutobi. Meanwhile, Sarada's father, Sasuke warns Naruto of an impending threat connected to Kaguya Ōtsutsuki's bloodline. Kaguya's successors, Momoshiki and Kinshiki Ōtsutsuki abduct Naruto to use the Nine-Tailed Fox, Kurama that is sealed within him, to revitalize the dying Divine Tree from their dimension. Boruto, Sasuke and the four Kage, leaders of other ninja villages, manage to save Naruto and fight together to defeat the Ōtsutsuki. But before dying, Momoshiki places a mark on Boruto called "Karma".

Boruto and the others soon learn about a group called "Kara" searching for people who possess Karma marks. Boruto's team meets a boy, named Kawaki, a fugitive from Kara who also has Karma. Naruto adopts him into the family and tries to protect him from Kara. Later, Sasuke discovers that all Karma users will be taken over by the Ōtsutsuki clan, including Kara's leader Jigen and Boruto. Meanwhile, a mutiny begins in Kara. Koji Kashin, a clone of Naruto's late master Jiraiya, challenges Jigen, while Kara member Amado reveals that Jigen has been possessed by Isshiki Ōtsutsuki ever since he was betrayed by Kaguya when they came to Earth millennia ago. Amado further explains that Karma allows the Ōtsutsuki clan to resurrect via the host's body.

Isshiki attempts to find Kawaki, but Naruto confronts him head-on. Due to his limited lifespan, Isshiki dies as a result of Kurama's sacrifice. Momoshiki uses this as an opportunity to possess Boruto and kill the others, but Sasuke and Kawaki fight him until Boruto regains control of his body. Isshiki requests Code, guardian of the Ten-Tails, to carry on the Ōtsutsuki will. Code releases Eida and Daemon, two powerful cyborgs created by Amado that were supposed to have been disposed of. Eida agrees to help Code kill Naruto if he in turn spares Kawaki for her to romance with, because her powers of seduction hinder her from experiencing proper love except with Ōtsutsuki. Code finds Kawaki, and Boruto fights him using Karma. However, Momoshiki takes control of Boruto's body, forcing Kawaki to kill him. Momoshiki revives Boruto, causing Boruto to become a full Ōtsutsuki.

== Production ==
The anime series was originally directed by Hiroyuki Yamashita, who also directed the Boruto film, until episode 66. Toshirō Fujii took over as series director from episode 67–104, and Masayuki Kōda from episode 105–281 and 287–293. Noriyuki Abe served as chief director until episode 104, and as series director from episode 282–286. Besides formerly writing the manga, Ukyō Kodachi supervised the anime's story until episode 216, while series creator Masashi Kishimoto acted as a supervisor for episodes 8 and 9. Makoto Uezu was in charge of series composition until episode 66, while Masaya Honda took over starting episode 67. Tetsuya Nishio and Hirofumi Suzuki returned from previous Naruto anime to design the characters.

== Release ==
At the Naruto and Boruto stage event at Jump Festa on 17 December 2016, it had been announced that the manga series would be adapted into an anime project, which was later confirmed to be a television series adaptation that would feature an original story. Additionally, an original video animation was previously released as a part of CyberConnect2's video game collection, Naruto Shippuden: Ultimate Ninja Storm Trilogy (2017), which depicts a new mission where Boruto's team chases a thief.

The television anime series, produced by Pierrot, premiered on TV Tokyo on 5 April 2017. The episodes are being collected in DVDs in Japan, starting with the first four episodes on 26 July 2017. The idea of choosing Pierrot and TV Tokyo again came from an editor of Weekly Shōnen Jump who found it fitting since there was a timeslot available for a young audience. On 21 April 2020, it was announced that episode 155 and onward would be delayed until 6 July 2020, due to the ongoing COVID-19 pandemic. The series finished its first part with episode 293 on 26 March 2023; a second part was announced to be in development.

Viz Media has licensed the series in North America. In promoting the anime, Crunchyroll started sharing free segments of the series in early 2018. On 21 July 2018, it was announced at San Diego Comic-Con that the English dub of the anime would premiere on Adult Swim's Toonami programming block beginning on 29 September 2018. In Australia, the anime began airing on ABC Me starting from 21 September 2019. In the Philippines, the series was broadcast on Yey! from 16 December 2019 to 21 February 2020, airing the first 52 episodes.

== Music ==
The music for the series was co-composed by Yasuharu Takanashi and his musical unit, Yaiba. A CD soundtrack titled Boruto Naruto Next Generations Original Soundtrack 1 was released on 28 June 2017. The second soundtrack was released on 7 November 2018.

The anime used 35 different theme songs: 12 openings and 23 endings.

=== Opening theme songs ===
No.	Song Title	Artist	Episodes	Notes
1	"Baton Road"	Kana-Boon	1–26	
2	"OVER"	Little Glee Monster	27–51	
3	"It's all in the game"	Qyoto	52–75	
4	"Lonely Go!"	Brian the Sun	76–100	
5	"Golden Time"	Fujifabric	101–126	
6	"Teenage Dream"	miwa	127–150	
7	"Hajimatteiku Takamatteiku"	Sambomaster	151–180	
8	"Baku"	Ikimonogakari	181–205	
9	"Gamushara"	Chico with HoneyWorks	206–230	
10	"Gold"	FLOW	231–255	
11	"Kirarirari"	Kana-Boon	256–281	
12	"Shukuen"	Asian Kung-Fu Generation	282–293	

=== Ending theme songs ===
No.	Song Title	Artist	Episodes	Notes
1	"Dreamy Journey"	the peggies	1–13	
2	"Sayonara Moon Town"	Scenarioart	14–26	
3	"Boku wa Hashiritsuzukeru"	MELOFLOAT	27–39	
4	"Denshin Tamashī"	Game-Jikkyosha Wakuwaku Band	40–51	
5	"Kachō Fūgetsu"	COALAMODE.	52–63	
6	"Laika"	Bird Bear Hare and Fish	64–75	
7	"Polaris"	HITORIE	76–87	
8	"Tsuyogari LOSER"	ЯeaL	88–100	
9	"Ride or Die"	Skypeace	101–113	
10	"Mikanseina Hikari-tachi"	Haruka Fukuhara	114–126	
11	"Wish on"	LONGMAN	127–138	
12	"Fireworks"	FlowBack	139–150	
13	"Maybe I"	Seven Billion Dots	151–167	
14	"Central"	Ami Sakaguchi	168–180	
15	"Answers"	Mol-74	181–192	
16	"Kimi ga Ita Shirushi"	halca	193–205	
17	"Who are you?"	PELICAN FANCLUB	206–218	
18	"Prologue"	JO1	219–230	
19	"Voltage"	Anly	231–242	
20	"Twilight Fuzz"	THIS IS JAPAN	243–255	
21	"Bibōroku"	Lenny code fiction	256–268	
22	"Ladder"	Anonymouz	269–281	
23	"Mata ne"	Humbreaders	282–293	

== Reception ==
The anime was popular with Japanese readers of Charapedia, who voted it the ninth best anime show of Spring 2017. IGN writer Sam Stewart commended the focus on the new generation of ninjas as well as the differences between them and the previous generation. He praised the return of other characters like Toneri Otsutsuki and enjoyed the eye techniques. Stewart applauded the characterisation of both Shikadai and Metal Lee, calling their relationship as well as accidental fight interesting to watch and saying Boruto: Naruto Next Generations improves with each episode. Crunchyroll Brand Manager Victoria Holden joined IGN's Miranda Sanchez to discuss whether Next Generations could live up to the success of the old series while still reviewing previous episodes of the series. According to TV Tokyo, sales and gross profits of Boruto have been highly positive during 2018 taking the top 5 spot. In a Crunchyroll report, Boruto was seen as one of the most streamed anime series from 2018 in multiple countries, most notably the ones from Asia. UK Anime Network listed it as one of the best anime from 2019 for showing appealing original story arcs not present in the original serialization which contrasted the Naruto anime whose original stories failed to attract the audience.

In a more comical article, Geek.com writer Tim Tomas compared Boruto with the series The Legend of Korra, since both were different from their predecessors despite sharing themes with them. Sarah Nelkin considered Boruto as a more lighthearted version of the Naruto series, but Amy McNulty praised its 13th episode for the focus on a subplot that had been developing since the first episode because its revelations made the series darker. Stewart agreed with McNulty, commenting that the developers reached the climax of the anime's first story arc. The villain's characterisation also impressed the reviewer. Allega Frank of Polygon mentioned that during the start of both the manga and the anime, multiple fans were worried due to a flashforward in which an older Boruto is facing an enemy named Kawaki who implies Naruto might be dead; his fate left them concerned. The series ranked 80th in Tokyo Anime Award Festival in the Best 100 TV Anime 2017 category.

Critics also commented on Boruto's characterisation in the anime. Beveridge applauded the series' first episode, saying he felt Boruto's portrayal was superior to the one from the manga, while other writers enjoyed his heroic traits that send more positive messages to the viewers. Reviewers praised that the returning character Sasuke Uchiha had become more caring toward his daughter, Sarada, the female protagonist of the series, and they felt this highly developed the two characters. Critics felt this further helped to expand the connection between the Uchiha family members — Sasuke, Sakura, and Sarada — due to how their bond is portrayed during the anime's second story arc. Kawaki's fight with Garō was also the most viewed 2021 fight on Crunchyroll's YouTube channel weighted at 30 days. IGN praised Kawaki's fight against Garo in the anime.
