= Momoshiki Otsutsuki =

Fictional character from Boruto

- Naruto, Boruto: Naruto Next Generations character
- Momoshiki Otsutsuki as designed by Tetsuya Nishio
- First appearance: Boruto: Naruto the Movie (2015)
- Created by: Masashi Kishimoto
- Designed by: Masashi Kishimoto, Mikio Ikemoto
- Voiced by: Daisuke Namikawa (Japanese); Xander Mobus (English)

Momoshiki Otsutsuki (Japanese: 大筒木 モモシキ, Hepburn: Ōtsutsuki Momoshiki) is a fictional character, first introduced in Pierrot's 2015 anime film, Boruto: Naruto the Movie which acts as a sequel to Masashi Kishimoto's manga Naruto. A descendant of Otsutsuki and the series' villain Kaguya, Momoshiki appears in the film as the antagonist, searching to plant a Divine Tree in the world by absorbing the energy possessed by ninjas, the chakra, most notably one of the protagonists, Naruto Uzumaki. While in the film, Momoshiki is killed by the combined forces between Naruto and his son, Boruto, he plays a bigger role in the retelling of the movie, the manga and anime series Boruto: Naruto Next Generations; in his last moments Momoshiki places a cursed seal inside Boruto so that he will gradually revive through the child's body.

Momoshiki was created and designed by Masashi Kishimoto based on the Japanese figure Minamoto no Yoshitsune. The staff paid carefully to the handling of Momoshiki in the film throughout his fight scenes against the Uzumaki family and the ninja vigilante Sasuke Uchiha. However, he was given less focus in Mikio Ikemoto's series as the narrative focused more on Boruto and his adoptive brother Kawaki. The character is voiced by Daisuke Namikawa in Japanese and Xander Mobus in English.

Critical response to Momoshiki has been mixed. Reviewers enjoyed the character's fight scenes but felt that he was a weak villain due to his lack of appealing traits and how he is overshadowed by the protagonists. However, his role in the sequel earned a major impact for playing a key role in the narrative despite his death.

== Creation and development ==
Early sketches of Momoshiki by Masashi Kishimoto.

Momoshiki was created by Masashi Kishimoto who and had his design based on Minamoto no Yoshitsune, born Ushiwakamaru, a famous warrior and military commander during the Heian period, and master of the warrior monk Benkei. Kishimoto identified Naruto's fights alongside Sasuke against Momoshiki as the highlights of the film and asked that the film's staff pay close attention to those sequences. The Boruto anime's former director Hiroyuki Yamashita said he enjoys Mikio Ikemoto's drawing style, more realistic than Kishimoto's due to the former's attention to the character designs' details. He pointed out that Ikemoto's way of illustrating Momoshiki Otsutsuki's new appearance after consuming Kinshiki Otsutsuki surprised him due to how different it was compared to the original design from the Boruto movie. The battle against Kawaki was shown instead in the first chapter rather than Sasuke's one against Kinshiki Otsutsuki from the Boruto film to generate a different impact within the fans despite sharing the same storyline. Boruto's teenage design was first illustrated in little time.

Momoshiki is described as a being with superiority complex who changes his tone across the movie due to how ineffective his servant Kinishiki becomes and is forced to kill him in order to gain new power. Chengxi Huang, one of the key animators in charge of the television adaptation of the fight between Naruto, Sasuke and Boruto against Momoshiki wanted to properly animate. When the manga reaches the Vessel arc, Momoshiki's character is further expanded despite his death as the late Otsutsuki are described as beings who can resurrect by using the body of people cursed with power of Karma. In Momoshiki's case, he plans to use Boruto's body to revive. Though still not fully resurrected, Momoshiki plays a key role in the narrative as his powers are dangerous enough to destroy Konohagakure with the other members from Kara also being dangerous enemies to the protagonists.

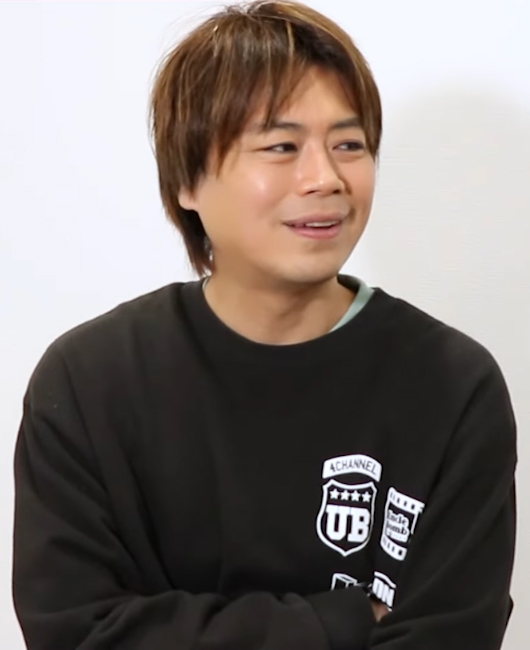
Daisuke Namikawa voices Momoshiki in Japanese

In the Japanese film and television series, Momoshiki is voiced by Daisuke Namikawa. Namikawa revealed that participating in the new Naruto film gave him pressure, but claimed to do his best to meet the expectations of this work, which has fans all over the world. Namikawa explains his role as a villain who is cannot be redeemed to due his large god complex and he views humans as inferior creatures. Namikawa was moved by the fact that the manga serialized for about 15 years was the original, and he felt the weight of the work. Momoshiki is voiced by Xander Mobus in the English dub.

== Appearances ==
Momoshiki's Byakugan

Momoshiki's Rinnegan

Momoshiki Otsutsuki is one of the two antagonists of Boruto: Naruto the Movie and a member of the main family of the Ōtsutsuki clan. A pale, androgynous man, he is a member of the Ōtsutsuki clan who was the reason Kaguya created the White Zetsu Army for, who comes to Earth to plant a new Shinju as the one he used is dying from using up its world's resources. Momoshiki possesses both a pair of Byakugan and Rinnegan, the latter located on his palms, which he uses to absorb and release ninjutsu. Targeting the Tailed Beasts for their chakra, attacking Killer Bee prior, Momoshiki and his partner Kinshiki come to Konohagakure with the objective of capturing Kurama from Naruto. The two manage to abduct Naruto to their dimension after destroying the Chunin Exams stadium, but before they could finish the extraction process, the pair are confronted by Boruto, Sasuke, and the four Kage. Overwhelmed, Momoshiki consumes a makeshift red pill from Kinshiki's body, making him even stronger with another Rinnegan appearing on his forehead. However, he is ultimately killed by Naruto and Boruto's combined Rasengan.

Momoshiki's Kāma

Momoshiki's fate is retconned in the series Boruto: Naruto Next Generations. Momoshiki uses his final living moments to have a private discussion with Boruto by freezing time, branding the boy with the Karma mark upon seeing his untapped potential while cryptically warning him of the tribulations he will face in his future. During a fight against a Kara member, Boro, Boruto's Karma causes him to be possessed by Momoshiki who seeks to take over his body through the Karma. Momoshiki absorbs the chakra from an unconscious Naruto to create his own Rasengan technique and kill Boro. Momoshiki possesses Boruto's body to stab Sasuke's Rinnegan in order to weaken him. However, he is unable to fight properly and is overpowered by Sasuke and Kawaki. Eventually, Boruto regains his senses and breaks free of Momoshiki's possession. In the next days, Boruto is given a medicine that will nullify the power of Momoshiki and is able to continue living normally. When Boruto faces Code from Kara, he tries taking advantage of Momoshiki's powers to increase his strength. However, this causes Momoshiki's resurrection and tries to kill Naruto. Fearing his father's death, Boruto asks Kawaki to kill him to take Momoshiki alongside him.

The character is also present in the video game Naruto Shippuden: Ultimate Ninja Storm 4 as a boss character in the form of downloadable content. He was later added as playable character.

== Reception ==
Initial response to Momoshiki's character was mixed. Alexandria Hill of Otaku USA enjoyed Boruto's fight against the film's villain and his team-up with Naruto and Sasuke, despite being skeptical while watching it for the first time. Dan Rhodes said that Sasuke and Naruto's fight scenes are some of the best parts of the film, predicting longtime fans would look forward to them. However, some writers felt the villains were forgettable. Thais Valdivia from Hobby Consolas stated that despite Momoshiki's multiple traits such his desire for immortality and invulnerability, his character is overshadowed by Boruto, Naruto and Sasuke. The Fandom Post saw Momoshiki and Kinshiki's plan to capture Naruto's Nine-tailed Demon Fox as a rehash from the terrorists Akatsuki from Naruto Shippuden who also aimed to take the nine supernatural beasts from the world. However, the reviewer found Momoshiki's plans better executed due to the execution in regards to how it affects Naruto and his allies. Los Angeles Times stated that while he is a strong villain, the character lacks appeal. Japanator enjoyed the first scenes involving Momoshiki and Kinshiki as seen by Sasuke, as it gave the film an enjoyable beginning, but criticized his weak powers as he poses less challenge than Toneri Ōtsutsuki from The Last: Naruto the Movie (2014) while sharing the same motivations as the previous villain, Kaguya.

In regards to the sequel, Anime News Network enjoyed the handling of Momoshiki's fight the Kages, Sasuke and Boruto but felt the mystery of the Ōtsutsuki clan is ruined in the process. Manga News found Momoshiki's fight enjoyable, comparing it to the Dragon Ball series due to the multiple types of similar techniques employed but felt Boruto's inclusion to be able to match him was forced since Boruto was quite weaker to the villain and becomes stronger noticeably faster. Aiptcomics praised Momoshiki's new form from the manga which he found made him a more menacing and striking villain. The Fandom Post noted that while the manga is similar to the original Boruto movie, Ikemoto made few changes to the narrative, most notably to his fate and curse on the young protagonist. Manga News criticized Momoshiki's possession of Boruto in the manga as derivative element known in the franchise similar to early Naruto scenes where the character was influenced by the Nine-tailed Demon Fox. IGN praised the fight scenes Momoshiki is involved, and later claimed that Momoshiki turns into a more striking villain the second the time he possesses the young ninja due to how ruthlessly he attacks Sasuke, taking his Rinnegan eye by stabbing him with a kunai in the face. In poll from 2021, Momoshiki took the 15th place.
