= Ikemoto =

Ikemoto (written: 池本 or 池元) is a Japanese surname. Notable people with the surname include:

- Mikio Ikemoto (池本 幹雄, born 1977), Japanese manga artist
- Seichi Ikemoto (池本 誠知, born 1975), Japanese mixed martial artist
- Tomoki Ikemoto (池元 友樹, born 1985), Japanese footballer
