= Boruto: Naruto the Movie =

2015 film directed by Hiroyuki Yamashita

- Theatrical release poster
- Directed by: Hiroyuki Yamashita
- Screenplay by: Masashi Kishimoto; Ukyō Kodachi (cooperation)
- Story by: Masashi Kishimoto
- Based on: Naruto by Masashi Kishimoto
- Starring: Yūko Sanpei; Kokoro Kikuchi; Junko Takeuchi; Noriaki Sugiyama
- Music by: Yasuharu Takanashi; Yaiba
- Production company: Studio Pierrot
- Distributed by: Toho
- Release date: August 7, 2015
- Running time: 96 minutes
- Country: Japan
- Language: Japanese
- Budget: $21 million
- Box office: US$38.5 million

Boruto: Naruto the Movie is a 2015 Japanese animated martial arts fantasy film and the directorial debut of Hiroyuki Yamashita. It is based on Masashi Kishimoto's manga and anime Naruto, and is the second film to be a part of the canonical Naruto storyline, being a sequel to the manga series. It stars Yūko Sanpei, Junko Takeuchi, Kokoro Kikuchi and Noriaki Sugiyama. Set after the finale of the Naruto: Shippuden anime series and from the adaptations of episodes 53 to 66 of the Boruto: Naruto Next Generations anime series, the film focuses on Boruto Uzumaki, son of the Seventh Hokage Naruto Uzumaki, who cannot stay with his family due to being the leader of the Hidden Leaf Village. Vigilante Sasuke Uchiha returns to the village with warnings about two evil beings who may become a significant threat to the world peace secured by Naruto after the Fourth Great Ninja War.

The film was first teased in the post-credits scene of the previous film, The Last: Naruto the Movie (2014). Kishimoto took a large role in the making of The Last, handling the script and character designs. However, Kishimoto took an even larger role in the making of this film, handling the script, characters designs and screenplay. This brought him difficulties, because of which he required help from other staff members, such as the writer Ukyō Kodachi and director Yamashita. They created new scenes that left a deep impression on Kishimoto.

Released in August 2015, the film became the franchise's highest-grossing film, and its home media versions had good sales to the point of becoming Japan's best-selling releases in 2016. Critical reception of the movie has been mostly positive, with writers praising the animation, well-animated fight choreography as well as Boruto's growth, but it was criticized for its unmemorable antagonists along with Boruto's relationship with his father not being explored deeply, although the growing relationship in the climax was a subject of praise. Ukyo Kodachi and artist Mikio Ikemoto adapted the film as the first story arc of Boruto (2016), a manga sequel of Naruto manga series, with both it and its anime adaptation (in which it is the seventh story arc) altering some details with added content.

== Plot ==
In the fifteen years since the Fourth Great Ninja War and Naruto Uzumaki and Sasuke Uchiha's final showdown in the Valley of the End, the village of Konohagakure is thriving under the Seventh Hokage Naruto Uzumaki. He is married to Hinata Hyuga and has two children, Boruto Uzumaki and Himawari Uzumaki. Boruto, Sarada Uchiha—Sasuke Uchiha and Sakura Haruno's daughter—and a mysterious child named Mitsuki have become an elite ninja team under their teacher, Konohamaru Sarutobi. Boruto is truly upset at Naruto for focusing more on his job as Hokage than on their family.

Sasuke returns to the village to warn Naruto about two powerful and evil opponents he faced earlier. Fully enraged after Naruto misses Himawari's birthday, Boruto meets Sasuke and asks him to train him so that he can become strong enough to surpass Naruto. Sasuke agrees only on the condition that Boruto performs the Rasengan technique, which he then learns from Konohamaru. Frustrated with the difficulty of learning the perfect Rasengan, Boruto uses a Scientific Ninja Tool to impress Sasuke. The tool was given to him by the arrogant scientist Katasuke, who wanted his experiment to gain publicity for marketing purposes before Naruto rejected the proposal. Despite Boruto's dishonesty, Sasuke honors his promise and helps him prepare for the upcoming Chunin Exam, a test taken by young ninjas.

Boruto, wishing to be acknowledged by his father, passes the Chunin Exams by using the Scientific Ninja Tool to cheat. Despite the victory, Naruto realizes immediately that Boruto was cheating and publicly disqualifies his son. Tired of his father prioritizing his job, Boruto snaps of sadness, making Naruto realize it's his fault the situation happened in the first place. The moment gets interrupted when Momoshiki and Kinshiki Ōtsutsuki appear. The Ōtsutsuki duo are after Kurama, the Nine-Tailed Fox that lives within Naruto's body, as their objective is to create a chakra fruit in order to become immortal. Ensuring nobody stands in their way, Momoshiki destroys the surrounding area, though Naruto sacrifices himself to protect Boruto and the civilians.

Once Boruto awakes, Sasuke reveals that Naruto is still alive elsewhere, and allies himself with the other Kage to rescue him. Finally understanding Naruto's role, Boruto insists on joining them to make amends with his father. Using Sasuke's abilities, they arrive to find Naruto bound by the Otsutsuki duo, and a battle begins. With Naruto freed, he and Boruto pause for a moment to bond and acknowledge fault on both sides for how their father-son relationship suffered. Momoshiki soon finds himself cornered and devours Kinshiki to increase his strength, only to be quickly defeated by the combined might of Naruto and Sasuke. Having sneaked along, Katasuke attempts to kill Momoshiki with a Scientific Ninja Tool, but it inadvertently restores his strength. Placing his trust in Boruto, Naruto shares his chakra with his son to create a Massive Rasengan, an attack which obliterates Momoshiki.

In the days following the victory, Naruto improves his relationship with his family by making sure that he always has time to spend with them. Boruto resolves to follows Sasuke's steps to become a vigilante, a ninja who protects the village from the shadows and supports Sarada's dream of becoming the next Hokage, much to Sarada's blush. The conversation continues with Mitsuki revealing he is the son of a former arch-nemesis of the village, Orochimaru, surprising both his teammates.

== Voice cast ==
Character	Japanese	English
Boruto Uzumaki	Yūko Sanpei	Amanda C. Miller
Naruto Uzumaki	Junko Takeuchi	Maile Flanagan
Sasuke Uchiha	Noriaki Sugiyama	Yuri Lowenthal
Momoshiki Otsutsuki	Daisuke Namikawa	Xander Mobus
Kinshiki Otsutsuki	Hiroki Yasumoto	Wally Wingert
Sarada Uchiha	Kokoro Kikuchi	Cherami Leigh
Mitsuki	Ryūichi Kijima	Robbie Daymond
Inojin Yamanaka	Atsushi Abe	Spike Spencer
Shikadai Nara	Kenshō Ono	Todd Haberkorn
Chocho Akimichi	Ryoko Shiraishi	Colleen Villard
Himawari Uzumaki	Saori Hayami	Melissa Fahn
Darui	Ryota Takeuchi	Ogie Banks
Gaara	Akira Ishida	Liam O'Brien
Chōjūrō	Kōki Miyata	Brian Beacock
Kurotsuchi	Hana Takeda	Laura Bailey
Hinata Uzumaki	Nana Mizuki	Stephanie Sheh
Sakura Uchiha	Chie Nakamura	Kate Higgins
Shikamaru Nara	Showtaro Morikubo	Tom Gibis
Konohamaru Sarutobi	Hidenori Takahashi	Max Mittelman
Tenten	Yukari Tamura	Danielle Judovits
Shino Aburame	Shinji Kawada	Derek Stephen Prince
Sai	Satoshi Hino	Ben Diskin
Ino Yamanaka	Ryōka Yuzuki	Colleen Villard
Rock Lee	Yoichi Masukawa	Brian Donovan
Killer Bee	Hisao Egawa	Catero Colbert
Yurui	Kengo Kawanishi	Bryce Papenbrook
Katasuke	Taira Kikumoto	Christopher Corey Smith
Kurama	Tesshō Genda	Paul St. Peter

== Production ==
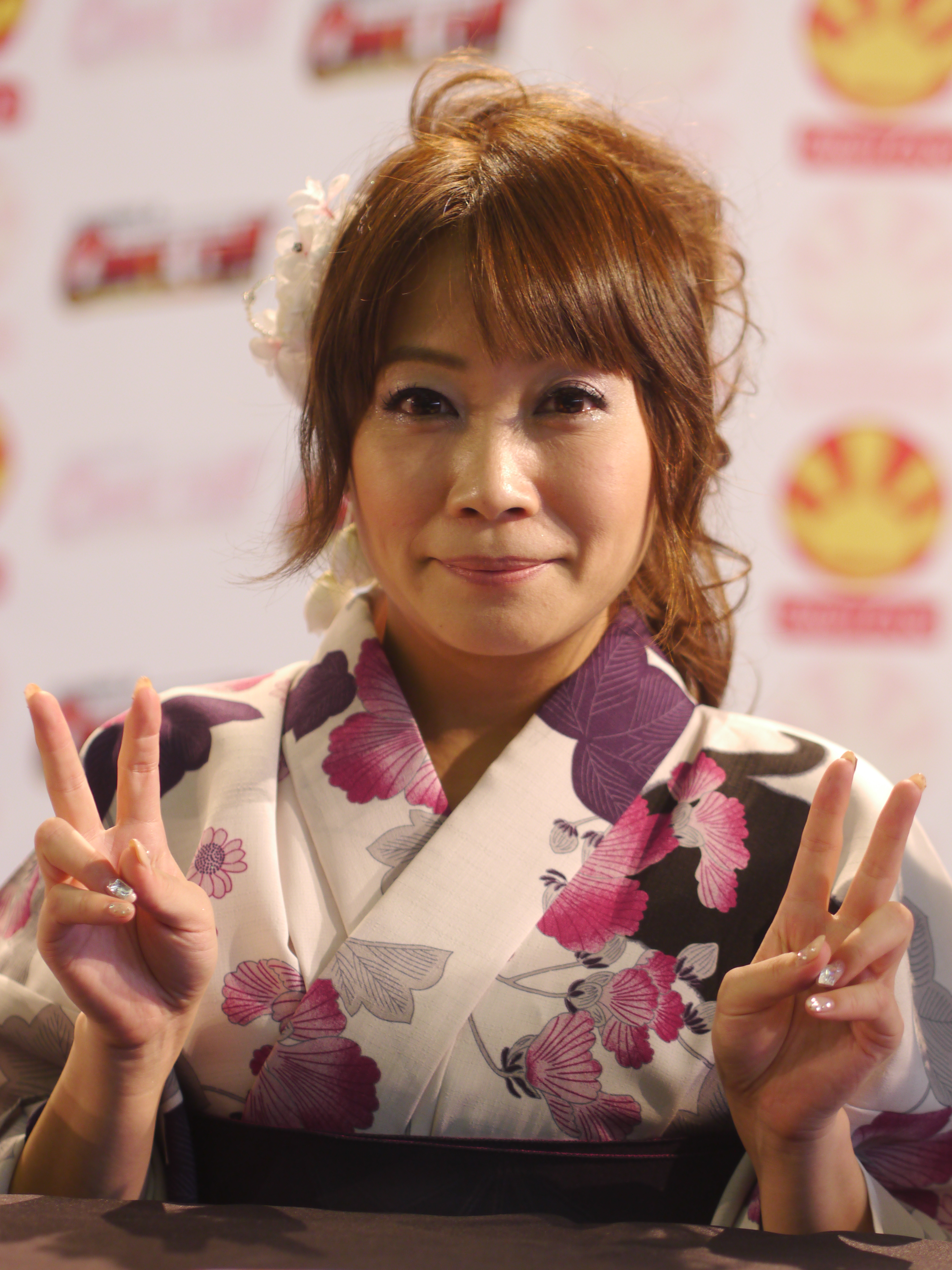
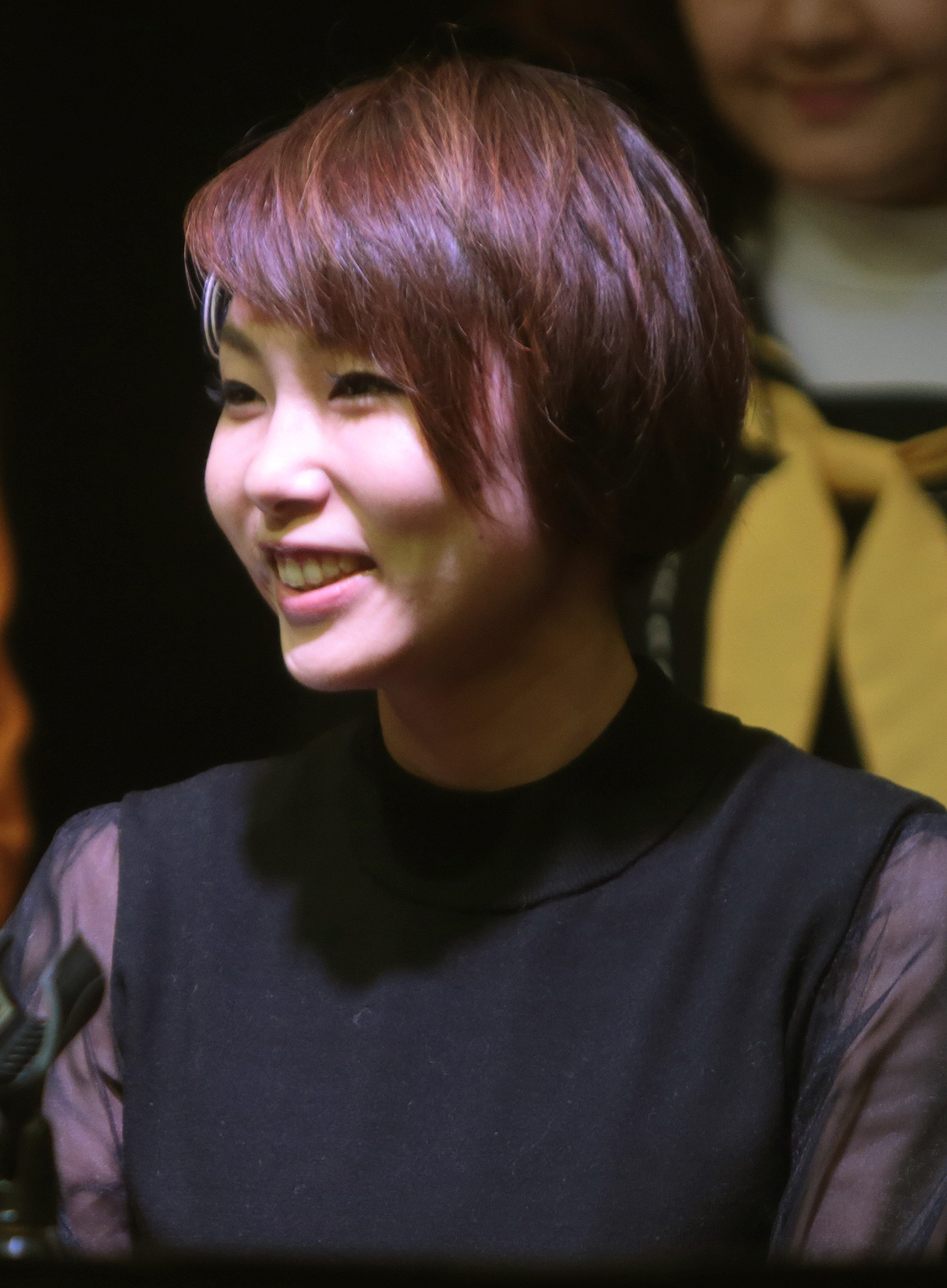
Junko Takeuchi and Yūko Sanpei, the Japanese actresses who voiced Naruto Uzumaki and Boruto Uzumaki, respectively

Boruto was first announced in December 2014 by a post-credits scene in The Last: Naruto the Movie. Kishimoto stated the film would star the son of Naruto and Hinata, Boruto Uzumaki, as well as Sasuke daughter, Sarada. While not knowing what the film would be about, voice actress Junko Takeuchi was pleased with the announcement. Takeuchi was surprised with how Naruto has grown up ever since she first voiced him, not only in the idea of age or new job but also the fact that he has become a father. As a result, she befriended Yūko Sanpei, voice actress behind Boruto. Takeuchi felt the writing for the adult Naruto was different from his younger days as his mannerism had changed too, joking that she never saw such growth in the story when first voicing him. As a result, she mentions having had some inner complications with how she should show the character's growth. Yūko Sanpei was thankful for being offered this position and joked about how Junko Takeuchi became a "father" as her voice role was Naruto. Initially, Sanpei recalls having difficulties voicing Boruto; when she received her script for the film, she began to understand Boruto's concept as the boy who loves his father dearly, which helped her voice the character better. Noriaki Sugiyama expected to see a bond between his character, Sasuke, and his student Boruto.

Flanagan and Amanda C. Miller found the two family members similar in nature despite having different backgrounds. Flanagan was surprised by how her character changed across the years but felt he was still the same for her, finding challenging to voice Naruto again when coming back to voice the younger Naruto. In regards to the change of tone, Flanagan was surprised by the fact that the dubbers did not replace her despite Naruto's age but felt it was something common in Japanese series. While having too many thoughts about the film, Kishimoto stated he was not sure what technique Boruto would use in the story. Director Hiroyuki Yamashita was added to the project in December 2014, and Kishimoto began writing the script the following month. Yamashita said that he had felt pressured due to the time constraints, owing to the movie's planned release date, and had almost refused to direct it. Kishimoto explained that he felt he could rely on Yamashita based on his work on the animated adaptations of the Naruto manga. Kishimoto had originally envisioned the film's storyline as a manga, but did not feel there was enough time to complete it and chose to write a screenplay instead.

Kishimoto requested that the characters rely on the hand-to-hand combat moves from taijutsu rather than the regular ninja techniques from ninjutsu. This was a change from the previous Naruto films. Kishimoto identified Naruto's fights alongside Sasuke against Momoshiki as the highlights of the film and asked that the film's staff pay close attention to those sequences. He said that the staff had very few ideas on how to advance the story; writer Ukyō Kodachi developed the idea that Boruto Uzumaki's Rasengan move becomes invisible when activated. Yamashita said some scenes had to be removed from the film because of the short time the team had to develop Boruto. Yamashita's favorite scene was Sasuke's fight against Kinshiki. The initial scene was also revised multiple times to reduce its length. Yamashita said they had to remove scenes that featured Shikadai and other characters from the film. He also added that the film's success was mostly due to many of Kishimoto's ideas which the staff liked.

The script was initially completed around the end of January 2014 and was finalised a month later due to fans claiming a false translation in episode 8 season 8 of Gaara's mother. There has been claims it stated " Karura's sister" when in check was the bother. After a few corrections. Even though Kishimoto had worked before on Road to Ninja (2012) and The Last (2014), this time he encountered various problems because of his greater involvement with Boruto — specifically writing the script. To prepare for Boruto, Kishimoto said that he had read a book about the process of creating screenplays. He added that in Boruto he paid tribute to several movies, the most notable being the 1996 film The Rock and the 2002 film Spider-Man. The tribute to The Rock was mostly done by using Kishōtenketsu, which is a common way of structuring stories in Japan. Kishimoto developed Boruto and Naruto's relationship based on his relationship with his own sons.

One of the earliest scenes Kishimoto conceived for the movie was that Boruto would follow the steps of Sasuke Uchiha rather than his father during the ending while talking with Sarada Uchiha. Boruto was supposed to have another teacher, but because Sasuke had not made many appearances in the previous films, he took this place as Kishimoto wanted him to have a larger role. This is also a reference to Piccolo and Gohan from the Dragon Ball manga series by Akira Toriyama. The director also conceived the idea of Boruto putting on a bandana to convince his mother, Hinata, that he would aid his father and get approval to go with Sasuke and all the leaders of the villages. This scene from the movie made the deepest impression on Kishimoto. Two other scenes written by the staff that Kishimoto enjoyed were Sasuke's use of one of his taijutsu moves and the combination of his Susanoo technique and Naruto's recreation of the Nine-Tailed Fox, Kurama. Kishimoto felt the cast's facial expressions were realistic, which made the film look more appealing. In the climax, when Naruto passes all his energy to Boruto to create a giant Rasengan, Yamashita added multiple flashbacks of Naruto's past, which Kishimoto liked. In developing Naruto's role, Kishimoto felt it would not be entertaining to see him as a flawless father and instead decided to make him an incompetent one. However, he wanted Naruto and Boruto's bond strengthened during the plot.

=== Audio ===
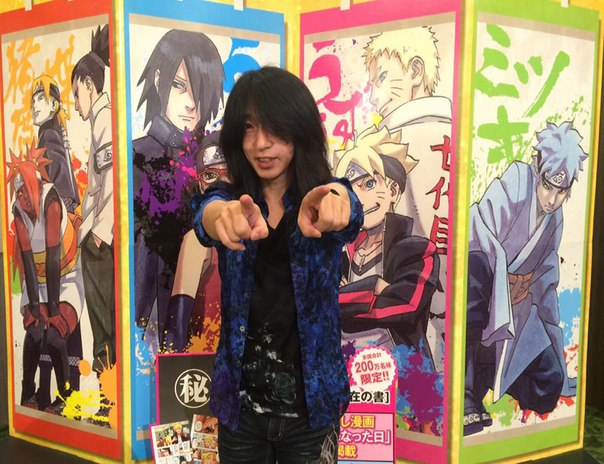
Yasuharu Takanashi with images of Boruto behind

Yasuharu Takanashi and his musical unit, Yaiba, composed the music for Boruto: Naruto the Movie. The soundtrack was released in Japan on August 5, 2015. Kishimoto wanted the band Kana-Boon to play the main theme song, having been impressed with their work on "Silhouette" which was originally used as an opening theme for the anime of Naruto: Shippuden. Titled "Diver" (ダイバー), Kishimoto called it "an amazing song that many people can feel for. When this song plays during the ending, even I'd be definitely crying." A fan of the Naruto series, vocalist and guitarist Maguro Taniguchi, wrote the song and was pleased to be working for the Naruto franchise once again. The theme serves as a reference to Boruto; one of the band's singers stated that it reflects how the character constantly changes from the beginning to the end of the story. Another aspect of the theme song was the relationship between a father and his son and the difficulties in expressing their bond. The CD single of this theme was released on August 4, 2015.

== Release ==
=== Theatrical ===
The film was released on August 7, 2015. Theatergoers were given two different types of hand fans — one of them using images of Naruto and Boruto, the other Sasuke and Sarada's.

=== Home media ===
Its DVD and Blu-ray versions were released on July 6, 2016, by Aniplex. They include the original video animation The Day Naruto Became Hokage showing how Naruto Uzumaki becomes the Seventh Hokage but does not make it to the ceremony. During its release week, the Japanese Blu-ray of the film sold 30,758 units while the DVD sold 24,372 units. By the end of 2016, the DVD had sold 35,183 units.

Manga Entertainment released the movie in cinemas in the United Kingdom on November 10, 2015. Manga Entertainment released the home media release on June 5, 2017. Licensed by Viz Media in the United States in July 2015, the film was screened in over 80 cities in October of the same year. Its home media release was published on March 28, 2017. In Australia and New Zealand, the film was licensed by Madman Entertainment and earned $216,943 in Australia. A fan film was developed by Deerstalker Pictures to promote the Australian release. The home media version was released on May 25, 2017.

== Reception ==
=== Box office ===
Boruto became the 11th highest-grossing Japanese film (and the 7th highest-grossing anime film) at the Japanese box office in 2015, with ¥2.62 billion. It earned ¥680.1 million yen (around US$5.46 million) during its debut, giving the series its highest-grossing opening. On August 25, the film became the highest-grossing movie in the Naruto series, earning ¥2.02 billion in 19 days with 1.56 million admissions. The film grossed US$919,651 in the United States and Canada and CN¥103.2 million in China.

=== Critical response ===
The growing relationship between Naruto and Boruto was a subject of praise.

Yahoo! Japan offers Boruto a rating of 4.31 out of 5 stars. Amy McNulty of Anime News Network gave the film an overall grade of "A−", calling it "a step in the right direction for Masashi Kishimoto's Start of a New Era Project"; McNulty and UK Anime Network's Andy Hanley enjoyed Naruto's relationship with his son and how the differences between their childhoods become the focus of the film. The Fandom Post's Richard Gutierrez called it a "wonderful coming-of-age film", remarking the focus on the theme of generations, Naruto's growth since his first appearance, as well as how Boruto seeks to surpass him but ends up caring more for him by the time the film finishes.

The fight scenes have been the subject of major praise for their animation. Dan Rhodes said that Sasuke and Naruto's fight scenes are some of the best parts of the film, predicting longtime fans would look forward to them. However, some writers felt the villains were forgettable. Christian Chiok of Japanator and Charles Solomon of the Los Angeles Times agreed with Rhodes, comparing the fight scenes with those from the famous Dragon Ball franchise based on their animation. Solomon found the enemies interesting and concluded that "no Naruto fan will want to miss Boruto, which suggests a new direction the franchise may take, now that the long-running TV series has finally concluded". Alexandria Hill of Otaku USA enjoyed Boruto's fight against the film's villain and his team-up with Naruto and Sasuke, despite being sceptical while watching it for the first time.

Japanator's Christian Chiok enjoyed Boruto's character development, his relationship with his father and how heartwarming it becomes in the movie. Toon Zone agreed, stating that despite possible flaws in Boruto's character, his growth through the film makes him a more appealing character, saying the movie "is one of the better films in the Naruto canon and shouldn't be missed by fans of the series". Chris Zimmerman of DVD Talk remarked how the writers portray Boruto's poor relationship with his father and how it improves during the climax of the film. Alexandria Hill agreed, feeling the fractured relationship between Boruto and Naruto was the main point of the story, while the subplot about Boruto's use of technology to win fights was not explored. On the other hand, Kotaku's Richard Eisenbeis was critical of Boruto's development, feeling that the bond with his father at the end of the film was weak and not believable. In contrast, Chiok felt the bond between Boruto and his father was well developed and said that, while Boruto and Sarada do not wish to follow their fathers' paths, there was proof that they still loved them. Both Mcnulty and Toon Zone were also pleased with the title character's voicing by English voice actress Amanda C. Miller. The soundtrack gathered mixed opinions while Thais Valdivia of Hobby Consolas enjoyed the theme song provided by Kana-Boon.

Comic Book Resources listed the film as the best Naruto movie based on the user's Rotten Tomatoes score.

== Future ==
Pleased with Boruto: Naruto the Movie, Sanpei asked Kishimoto to make a sequel which elicited the wry request that she let him rest. A novelization of the movie written by Ukyō Kodachi was published by Shueisha on August 10, 2015. Manga author Kenji Taira released two gag manga series that parodied Boruto: one is set when Konohamaru's team is formed and the other is when Boruto requests Sasuke to become his teacher. CyberConnect2's fighting game Naruto Shippuden: Ultimate Ninja Storm 4 (2016) was given an expansion that adds returning characters such as Naruto and Sasuke in their Boruto forms as well as new ones from the film in order to retell the story but under the subtitle of Road to Boruto (2017). In May 2016, Boruto writer Ukyō Kodachi also started his own manga series with artist Mikio Ikemoto under the title Boruto: Naruto Next Generations, which begins by retelling the events of the film. Ikemoto claimed the scene in which Naruto helps his son to create a large Rasengan was his favorite at the time of drawing Boruto as across this moment he had to draw Naruto's past to the point he "felt the weight of Naruto series and its long history behind it." The television anime series of Boruto, which began in 2017, retells the events of the feature but with additional content. Similarly, Chengxi Huang, one of the key animators in charge of the television adaptation of the fight between Naruto, Sasuke and Boruto against Momoshiki wanted to properly display Naruto's facial expression during this scene as stating that while Naruto has grown up ever since his introduction, his gentle smile was the same.
