= Boruto =

Japanese manga and anime series and the sequel to Naruto

- First tankōbon volume cover, featuring Sarada Uchiha, Boruto Uzumaki, and Mitsuki

BORUTO(ボルト)
- Genre: Adventure; Fantasy
- Created by: Masashi Kishimoto
- Anime film
- Boruto: Naruto the Movie (2015)
- Series subtitle
- 1. Naruto Next Generations (2016–23); 2. Two Blue Vortex (2023–present)
- Manga
- Written by: Mikio Ikemoto; Ukyō Kodachi (#1–13); Masashi Kishimoto
- Illustrated by: Mikio Ikemoto
- Published by: Shueisha
- English publisher: NA: Viz Media
- Imprint: Jump Comics
- Magazine: Weekly Shōnen Jump (2016–2019); V Jump (2019–present)
- English magazine: NA: Weekly Shonen Jump
- Original run: 9 May 2016 – present
- Volumes: 29
- Anime television series
- Boruto: Naruto Next Generations (2017–2023)
- icon

Boruto (Note: Japanese: BORUTO(ボルト)) is a Japanese manga series written by Ukyō Kodachi (first 13 volumes) and Mikio Ikemoto, with illustrations by Ikemoto and supervision by Masashi Kishimoto. It is a spin-off and sequel to Kishimoto's manga series Naruto and follows the adventures of Naruto Uzumaki's son Boruto and his ninja team. The manga began serialization under the title Boruto: Naruto Next Generations (Note: BORUTO(ボルト) -NARUTO NEXT GENERATIONS-) in Shueisha's shōnen manga magazine Weekly Shōnen Jump in May 2016, with Kodachi as writer and Kishimoto as editorial supervisor. In July 2019, the series was transferred to Shueisha's monthly magazine V Jump. Kodachi stepped down in November 2020, after which Kishimoto took over as writer. In April 2023, the series concluded the first part of its story. Following a brief hiatus, it resumed in August of the same year with a second part titled Boruto: Two Blue Vortex (Note: BORUTO(ボルト) -TWO BLUE VORTEX-) in which a teenager Boruto continues protecting the village in solitude, now that he is seen as an enemy.

Boruto originated from Shueisha's proposal to Kishimoto to create a Naruto sequel. Kishimoto rejected this offer and suggested his former assistant Mikio Ikemoto draw it; Ukyō Kodachi, the writer of the film Boruto: Naruto the Movie, created the plot. A 293-episode anime television series adaptation, produced by Studio Pierrot under Kodachi's supervision (episodes 1–216), was broadcast on TV Tokyo from April 2017 to March 2023; a second part has been announced to be in development. Unlike the manga, which begins as a retelling of the Boruto film, the anime starts as a prequel set before Boruto and his friends become ninjas. In addition, a light novel series adaptation has been published.

The overall manga series had over 10 million copies in circulation in Japan by October 2025. The series's first part received a mixed-to-positive response, largely due to Boruto's characterization. His main character arc is resolved in the second volume, which led several writers to anticipate his growth and rivalry with Kawaki. Although the use of characters from the previous generation was criticized, Two Blue Vortex received more positive reviews for its portrayal of a stronger and more serious protagonist. Ikemoto's artwork, particularly the fight scenes, was also praised.

== Plot ==
=== Part I: Naruto Next Generations ===
The son of Seventh Hokage Naruto Uzumaki and his wife Hinata Uzumaki, and the older brother of Himawari Uzumaki, Boruto feels resentful over his father's absence due to his duties. Hoping to gain Naruto's approval, he trains with a ninja team led by Naruto's protégé, Konohamaru Sarutobi, alongside Sarada Uchiha and Mitsuki. Meanwhile, Sarada's father Sasuke warns Naruto of an impending threat connected to Kaguya Ōtsutsuki's bloodline. Kaguya's successors Momoshiki and Kinshiki Ōtsutsuki abduct Naruto to use Kurama, the Nine-Tailed Fox sealed within him, to revitalize the dying Divine Tree from their dimension. Boruto, Sasuke, and the four Kages, leaders of other ninja villages, manage to save Naruto and fight together to defeat the Ōtsutsuki. Before dying, however, Momoshiki places a mark on Boruto called "Karma".

Boruto and the others soon learn about a group called "Kara" searching for people who possess Karma marks. Boruto's team meets Kawaki, a fugitive from Kara who also has Karma. Naruto adopts him into the family and tries to protect him from Kara. Later, Sasuke discovers that all Karma users will be taken over by the Ōtsutsuki clan, including Kara's leader Jigen and Boruto. Meanwhile, a mutiny begins in Kara. Koji Kashin, a clone of Naruto's late master Jiraiya, challenges Jigen, while Amado reveals that Jigen has been possessed by Isshiki Ōtsutsuki ever since he was betrayed by Kaguya when they came to Earth millennia ago. Amado further explains that Karma allows the Ōtsutsuki clan to resurrect via the host's body.

Isshiki attempts to find Kawaki, but Naruto confronts him head-on. Due to his limited lifespan, Isshiki dies. Momoshiki uses this as an opportunity to possess Boruto and kill the others, but Sasuke and Kawaki fight him until Boruto regains control of his body. Isshiki requests Code, guardian of the Ten-Tails, to carry on the Ōtsutsuki will. Code releases Eida and Daemon, two powerful cyborgs created by Amado that were supposed to have been disposed of. Eida agrees to help Code kill Naruto if he in turn spares Kawaki for her to romance with, because her powers of seduction hinder her from experiencing proper love except with Ōtsutsuki. Code finds Kawaki, and Boruto fights him using Karma. However, Momoshiki takes control of Boruto's body, forcing Kawaki to kill him in front of Naruto. Momoshiki resurrects Boruto, causing Boruto to become a full Ōtsutsuki. Amado reveals that Eida's and Daemon's powers are shinjutsu, transplanted from the remains of Shibai Ōtsutsuki, an Ōtsutsuki who achieved godhood and transcended to another plane. He describes shinjutsu as divine abilities, more powerful than ninjutsu, which can be used only by gods, including the Karma.

Deducing that Boruto's complete transformation into an Ōtsutsuki is likely to turn him evil, Kawaki sends Naruto and Hinata into another dimension, promising to free them after they kill Boruto and the remaining Ōtsutsukis. In the ensuing chaos, Boruto confronts Kawaki and sacrifices his right eye to save Sarada. Sasuke arrives and tries to stop Kawaki, but Momoshiki possesses Boruto's body to help Kawaki escape. Kawaki meets with Eida, who activates her Senrigan dojutsu, known as the Omnipotence, to permanently rewrite everyone's memories. As a result, Kawaki and Boruto switch places in the minds of others, with Kawaki forcing Eida to spread the lie that Boruto has killed Naruto and Hinata. Only Sumire Kakei and Sarada remain unaffected by Omnipotence, and Sarada awakens her Mangekyo Sharingan out of fear of losing Boruto, convincing Sasuke of Boruto's innocence in the process. After Eida apologises for her actions, Boruto vows to regain everything taken from him.

=== Part II: Two Blue Vortex ===
Three years have passed. Kawaki visits the unconscious bodies of Naruto and Hinata in the Daikokuten dimension, while Sarada has failed to convince the Eighth Hokage, Shikamaru Nara, of Boruto's innocence. When Code attacks the Konoha village with an army of monsters, Boruto arrives to fight them off. Kawaki attacks Boruto and helps Code escape from the village, before Boruto can obtain information about the Ten-Tails. Boruto pursues Code to another dimension, where he encounters Code and the four Shinju clones. After escaping, Boruto gains the support of Koji Kashin, who has become his new mentor, while keeping watch over the tree in which Code has trapped Sasuke.

Boruto later reunites with Sarada and Sumire in the village. After Shikamaru learns the truth about what happened three years earlier, he tells Boruto that, until they are ready to expose Kawaki's crimes to the village, they must work together in secret, since Boruto is still considered a criminal.

After Boruto informs Shikamaru of the true purpose of the sentient Ten-Tails, two Shinju clones, Jura and Hidari, arrive in the village to search for Naruto. Himawari, who believes that Boruto is innocent and wants to help her brother, steps forward to oppose them. Meanwhile, Boruto continues protecting the village within the shadows despite being targeted by his own allies.

== Production ==
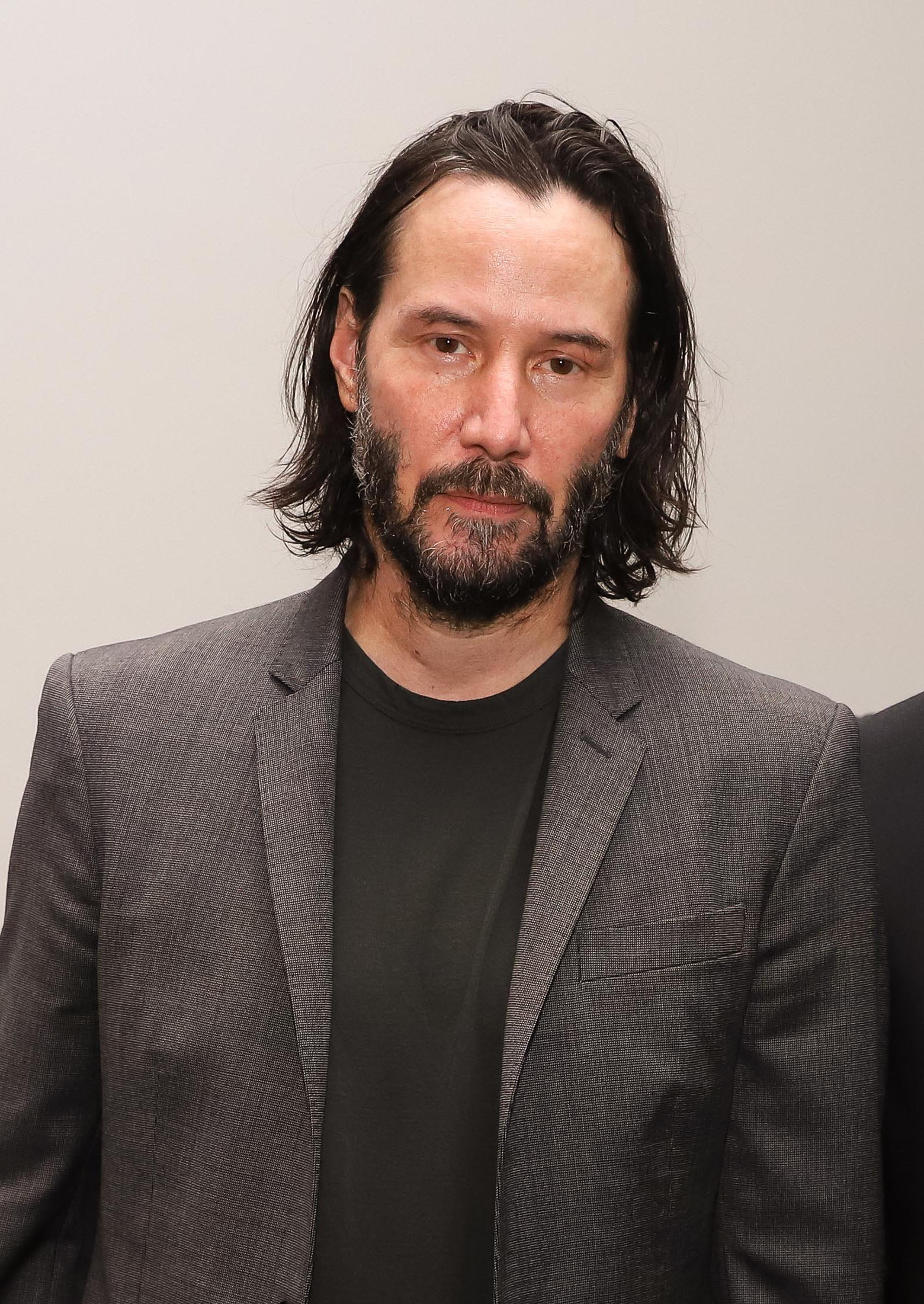
Keanu Reeves's character, Neo, from The Matrix, served as a major influence in the creation of Boruto's character

When the Naruto manga series concluded in 2014, the publishing company Shueisha asked Masashi Kishimoto to create a sequel. Kishimoto declined to draw it himself and instead recommended artist Mikio Ikemoto, who worked as his assistant since Naruto's early chapters. A countdown website titled "Next Generation" was used to promote the new manga, and in December 2015, Boruto: Naruto Next Generations's serialisation was announced. Kishimoto said that he wanted Boruto to surpass his own work.

The series was written by Ukyō Kodachi, who had written a light novel called Gaara Hiden (2015) and assisted Kishimoto in writing the script for Boruto: Naruto the Movie. Besides writing the series, Kodachi supervised the anime's story, while Kishimoto acted as a supervisor for episodes 8 and 9. Kodachi explained that the series's setting, which is known for a greater emphasis on science compared to Naruto, was influenced by his father, a physician. To further integrate technology with ninjutsu, Kodachi took inspiration from sci-fi role playing games.

Although Kishimoto revised the manga's scenario, he advised Ikemoto to develop his own art style instead of imitating his. Ikemoto agreed and expressed optimism about his own art style. While Ikemoto acknowledged that long-time fans might be disappointed that Kishimoto was not drawing Boruto, Ikemoto stated he would do his best in creating the manga. He felt honoured to create the art for Boruto, but said that he was grateful the series was released monthly rather than weekly because producing the required amount of nearly 20 pages per chapter would be stressful. Nevertheless, he still found the monthly workload challenging; regular chapters of Boruto tended to exceed 40 pages, with creation of the thumbnail sketches taking a week, production of the pages taking 20 days, and colouring as well as retoucing of images taking the rest of the time.

As the story progressed, Ikemoto intentionally altered Boruto's appearance and expressions. He initially drew Boruto with larger eyes during his interactions with Tento, but gave him a more rebellious look when he instead talked with Kawaki. In early 2019, Ikemoto stated that the relationship between Boruto and Kawaki would become the central focus of the story as it progressed toward their confrontation depicted in the series's flashforward opening. He expressed a desire to conclude the series in approximately 30 volumes. Discussing Boruto's role in the series, Ikemoto cited Keanu Reeves's character Neo from The Matrix franchise as an influence. Like Neo, Boruto has the potential to become a savior to his people, and the manga therefore focuses on his training to develop into a powerful ninja.

While Kishimoto did not initially write the series, he created multiple characters for the staff to use. Although Kishimoto did not specify whether Naruto or another major character would die, he remarked that such a situation would be interesting and added that the authors had the freedom to write the story as they wished. In November 2020, it was announced that after 51 chapters and 13 volumes, Kodachi would step down as writer, with Kishimoto assuming full writing duties and Ikemoto continuing as illustrator. In an August 2024 interview, Kishimoto stated that Ikemoto was completely in charge of the story and main illustrations of the series, emphasizing, "It really is Ikemoto's manga." Ikemoto stated that most of Kishimoto's villains were complex and frequently presented with a backstory that explained their motivations. He added that he could not write villains in the same way, which might make antagonists in Boruto appear more unreasonable by comparison.

While Boruto adopts a lighter tone than Naruto, its opening scene foreshadows a dark future. Kishimoto proposed this setup to give the manga greater impact and to distinguish it from the Boruto film. For this scene, Ikemoto drew an older Boruto, though he believed the design might change by the time the story reached that point. The authors also wanted the characters' fashion to reflect their personalities. The teenage Boruto wears clothes borrowed from Sasuke as a sign of respect toward his teacher and pride in his upbringing, while Kawaki does not wear anything noteworthy, reflecting his lack of personal interest.

=== Themes ===
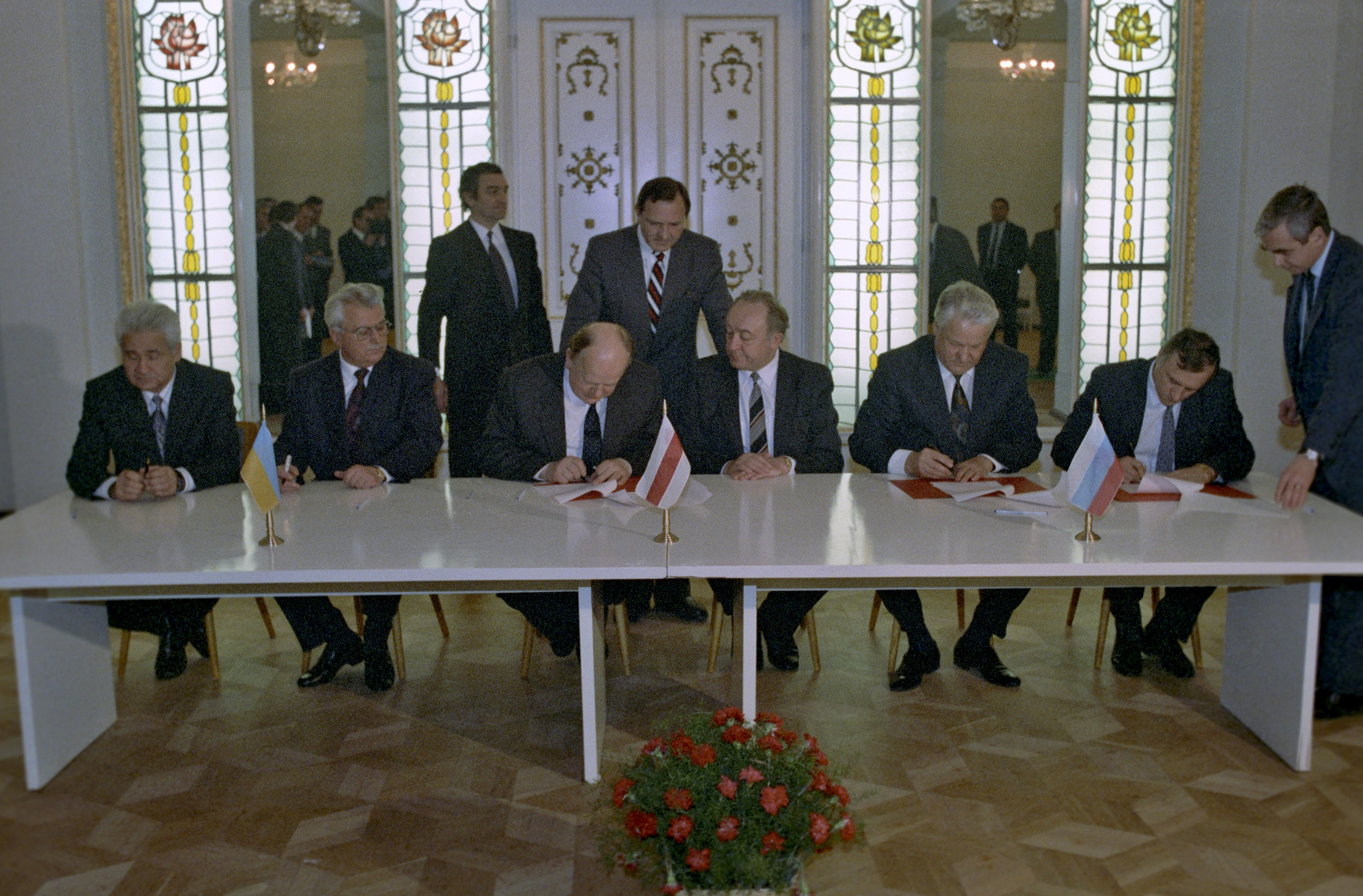
Ukyo Kodachi compared the setting of the manga to the end of the Cold War

Ukyo Kodachi drew parallels between Boruto and the post–Cold War era, suggesting that although the new generation lives in a time of peace, a complicating factor could return the world to chaos. At the end of Naruto, the protagonist succeeds in ending the world war between the Shinobi Alliance and the Akatsuki forces, leaving Boruto destined to protect the peace forged by his father. In Close Encounters in War, Benjamin Nickl compared the dynamic between Naruto and Boruto to that of Harry Potter and the Cursed Child, noting that the latter character had not experienced the same war as Naruto in the original series. Nickl likened Naruto to a traditional war soldier, observing that the series depicted him recalling fallen comrades or meeting fellow survivors who were his friends.

The series often focuses on family relationships, whether blood-related or chosen, with Kawaki feeling attached to his adoptive father Naruto and seeing Boruto as a brother. The Japanese band Asian Kung-Fu Generation, which wrote the opening theme song for the Boruto film, also commented on the relationship between Boruto and Kawaki, suggesting that the series might end with the fated face-off between the two characters and expressing hope that they would overcome their differences. The characters also have a lingering attachment to important figures they have lost, which is represented by their clothing, particularly in the cases of Boruto and Sarada. In addition, the technological advancements in the world of Naruto and Boruto reflect parallels to Kodachi's own upbringing.

Piotr Konieczny in The Encyclopedia of Science Fiction observed that the Naruto franchise increasingly incorporates science fiction tropes as it progresses, with many coming to the fore in the Boruto arc. For example, although the de facto alien Ōtsutsuki clan was revealed as the true mastermind behind the Akatsuki, their identities and backstory were not explored until the sequel The Last: Naruto the Movie and in Boruto, where the title protagonist takes his place in a new conflict against the clan's remnants.

== Media ==
=== Manga ===
Boruto: Naruto Next Generations is written by Ukyō Kodachi (vol.1–13) and Masashi Kishimoto (vol.14–20), with illustrations by Mikio Ikemoto. It began serialisation in Shueisha's shōnen manga magazine Weekly Shōnen Jump on 9 May 2016. It ran in the magazine until 10 June 2019 and was then transferred to V Jump on 20 July of the same year. The original series's creator, Masashi Kishimoto, initially supervised the manga; Ikemoto was his former assistant, while Kodachi was the co-writer of the Boruto: Naruto the Movie screenplay. In November 2020, Kodachi stepped down and Kishimoto took over as writer. In order to keep the entire Naruto saga within a hundred volumes, Ikemoto hoped to complete the Boruto manga in fewer than 30 volumes. In April 2023, it was announced that the manga would enter a hiatus; it resumed on 21 August of the same year, with a second part titled Boruto: Two Blue Vortex.

Viz Media licensed the manga for English release in North America in 2017, releasing the first volume alongside the English dub of Boruto: Naruto the Movie.

A spin-off manga titled Boruto: Saikyo Dash Generations, (Note: BORUTO-ボルト- SAIKYO DASH GENERATIONS) written by Kenji Taira, was serialised in Saikyō Jump from 1 April 2017 to 1 April 2021. Its chapters were collected in four volumes.

=== Anime ===
A 293-episode anime television series adaptation produced by Studio Pierrot was broadcast on TV Tokyo from 5 April 2017 to 26 March 2023. After the last episode was broadcast, a second part was announced to be in development.

=== Novels ===
A series of light novels written by Kō Shigenobu (novels 1–3 and 5) and Miwa Kiyomune (novel 4), with illustrations by Mikio Ikemoto, has also been produced based on the anime. The first novel, titled The New Konoha Ninja Flying in the Blue Sky!, (Note: 青天を翔る新たな木の葉たち!, Seiten o Kakeru Aratana Konoha-tachi!) was released on 2 May 2017. A second novel was released on 4 July 2017 under the title A Call From the Shadows!. (Note: 影からの呼び声!, Kage Kara no Yobigoe!) The third novel, Those Who Illuminate the Night of Shinobi!, (Note: 忍の夜を照らす者!, Shinobi no Yoru O Terasu Mono!) was released on 4 September 2017. The fourth novel, School Trip Bloodwind Records!, (Note: 修学旅行血風録!, Shūgakuryokō ketsu pū roku!) was released on 2 November 2017. The fifth novel, The Last Day at the Ninja Academy!, (Note: 忍者学校最後の日!, Ninja akademī saigo no hi!) was released on 4 January 2018.

=== Video games ===
The video game Naruto to Boruto: Shinobi Striker was released on 31 August 2018 and contains characters from both the Boruto and Naruto series. In August 2018, another Boruto game was announced for PC. Titled Naruto x Boruto Borutical Generations, it was revealed that that it would be free to play, with options to purchase in-game items, and would be available through the Yahoo! Game service. Boruto Uzumaki also appears as a playable character in the crossover fighting game Jump Force.

== Reception ==
=== Popularity ===
The manga has been popular in Japan, with its compilations appearing as top sellers multiple times. In its release week, the first manga volume sold 183,413 copies. The fourth volume of the manga received an initial print run of 450,000 copies. The series had one million copies in print by January 2017, and the overall series had over 10 million copies in circulation in Japan by October 2025. The manga's first volume also sold well in North America, with the overall series becoming the sixth-best-selling serialised manga in the United States in 2017 according to ICv2. From September to December 2018, Boruto was the fourth best-selling manga in North America.

=== Critical response ===
Rebecca Silverman of Anime News Network (ANN) said that Boruto appealed to her despite never having been into the original Naruto manga. She praised the story's handling of Boruto's angst, feeling it avoided coming across as "teen whining", and highlighted the way Sasuke decides to train him. Amy McNulty of ANN found the manga appealing to fans of the original Naruto series, adding that while Mitsuki has a small role in the story, his side story helps expand upon his origins. Nik Freeman of the same website criticised Boruto's lack of development in comparison with his introduction in Naruto's finale, and said that there were differences between the reasons behind the young Naruto and Boruto's vandalism of their villages. Nevertheless, Freeman liked Mitsuki's backstory as he felt it avoided retelling older stories.

Reviewing the first chapter online, Chris Beveridge of The Fandom Post regarded it negatively, complaining about the heavy focus on Naruto and Boruto's poor relationship and the retelling of elements from Boruto: Naruto the Movie. However, Beveridge praised the relationship between Naruto and Sasuke as well as the foreshadowing of a fight involving an older Boruto. Melina Dargis of the same website, reviewing the first volume, looked forward to the characters' development despite having already watched the Boruto movie. She was also pleased by Mitsuki's role in his own side story. Leroy Douresseaux of Comic Book Bin recommended the series to Naruto fans, praising how the new authors used the first volume to establish the protagonists' personalities. In a more negative review, Manga News compared the manga to Dragon Ball Super, criticizing it for relying on returning characters Naruto and Sasuke to fight certain Kara villains rather than using a new protagonist, and hoped that Boruto and his friends would be more active in later events. Although Boruto's relationship with Naruto was seen by writers as flawed, several of them acknowledged Boruto's growth by the second volume of the manga and looked forward to his continued development.

Kawaki's introduction in the series has been praised for its impact on the narrative and for establishing a rivalry with Boruto reminiscent of the rivalry between Naruto and Sasuke in the original manga. Game designer Hiroshi Matsuyama praised Kawaki's debut for his role in the story and the fight sequences he takes part in. Manga News said that Kawaki's introduction might feel forced, but that his relationship with Boruto had the potential to parallel that of Naruto and Sasuke, despite it being difficult to reach that level. Critics appreciated Kawaki's character development through his interactions with the Uzumaki family. As he grows closer with them, his cold demeanor begins to soften, particularly when he asks Naruto to train him as a ninja. Consequently, Manga News stated that since his introduction, Kawaki's development has played a more significant role in the narrative than that of the protagonist, Boruto. The Fandom Post agreed, stating that Kawaki's introduction to ninjutsu and his bonds with the Uzumaki family were the highlight of the manga's ninth volume, where Kawaki wishes to be trained by Naruto. IGN also found Kawaki's relationship with Naruto endearing, as he was willing to return to Jigen if the latter did not harm the Hokage, whom Kawaki described as his actual father. After Naruto and Sasuke are defeated by Kara, IGN anticipated that Kawaki and Boruto would need to protect the Hokage, and suggested that their Karma seals might be explored in the future by granting them new powers, even though the antagonists were wielding such powers as well.

The release of True Blue Vortex earned Boruto praise from Screen Rant, Siliconera, and IGN. Screen Rant praised the older Boruto's skills, while IGN looked forward to his fated duel with Kawaki, which had attracted more readers. His personality was observed as calmer and more threatening when interacting with Code, which was considered fitting for Sasuke's student. Hindustan Times wrote that Boruto had become popular online for the new skills he displayed while facing Code. The Outerhaven also considered Boruto an impressive character in Two Blue Vortex, attributing this not only to his personality but also to the new abilities he demonstrates while fighting Code. IGN noted that Sarada gained popularity among cosplayers after her appearance in Two Blue Vortex, particularly due to the work of the cosplayer Plern. In a subsequent review, The Outerhaven praised Sarada for being more open about her romantic feelings for Boruto. Nevertheless, the review still found Code to be a weak villain, as he had failed to kill any strong character during the time skip.

Silverman praised Ikemoto's artistic style as a fitting successor to Kishimoto's original work, particularly in fight scenes. Similarly, Ramen Para Dos and AkibaStation spoke positively of Ikemoto's art style for its easily followed fight scenes, as well as its handling of multiple character designs. In contrast, Beveridge criticised the adaptation of Kishimoto's artwork but commended Naruto and Sasuke's relationship as well as the foreshadowing of a fight involving an older Boruto.
