= Ukyō Kodachi =

Japanese novelist, manga artist, & screenwriter

- 小太刀右京
- Occupations: Novelist, manga artist, screenwriter
- Known for: Boruto: Naruto Next Generations

Ukyō Kodachi (Japanese: 小太刀右京, Hepburn: Kodachi Ukyō) is a Japanese novelist, manga artist, and screenwriter. He started out writing tabletop role-playing games, before debuting as a novelist in 2008 and a screenwriter in 2013. From 2016 to 2020, he worked on the Boruto: Naruto Next Generations manga.

== Biography ==
Kodachi grew up as the son of a physician, so he was interested in science from an early age. He started working by creating tabletop role-playing games. In 2008, Kodachi started writing professionally as a novelist with the novel adaptation of Macross Frontier. In 2013, he started working as a screenwriter for various anime series with Neppu Kairiku Bushi Road.

Two years later in 2015, he assisted Naruto author Masashi Kishimoto with screenplays for Boruto: Naruto the Movie. This would help him be granted the position of writer for the main series, Boruto: Naruto Next Generations, which premiered the next year. He held his position until the release of the 14th volume, when Kishimoto took over. The Boruto manga did very well commercially in Japan, and was the eighth best selling manga from Shueisha in 2017 and 2018. The series also performed well internationally, especially in North America, where the series became the sixth-best-selling serialised manga in 2017. In the fall season of 2018, the series was the fourth best-selling manga in the region.

== Works ==
=== Manga ===
- Infini-T Force: Arc to the Future (2015–2020) (serialized in Monthly Hero's; illustrated by Tatsuma Ejiri)
- Boruto: Naruto Next Generations (2016–2020) (serialized in Weekly Shōnen Jump and V Jump; illustrated by Mikio Ikemoto) (Note: Masashi Kishimoto took over starting on volume 14.)
- Ato 365 Hi no Dinner (2024–present) (serialized in Champion Red; story composition by Tsunaki Suda, and illustrated by Sonshō Hangetsuban)

=== Novels ===
- Macross Frontier (2008–2009) (illustrated by Risa Ebata and Hayato Aoki)
- Queen's Blade Rebellion (2009)
- Macross The Ride (2010–2011) (illustrated by Hidetaka Tenjin, Tommy Otsuka, and Katsumi Enami)
- Code Geass: Akito the Exiled (2013–2016)

=== Screenwriter ===
- Neppu Kairiku Bushi Road (2013)
- Gunslinger Stratos: The Animation (2015)
- Chaos Dragon (2015)
- Boruto: Naruto the Movie (2015)
- School-Live! (2015; episode 7)
- Danganronpa 3: The End of Hope's Peak High School (2016; individual episodes)
- Magical Girl Spec-Ops Asuka (2019; individual episodes)
- Lord El-Melloi II's Case Files {Rail Zeppelin} Grace Note (2019)
- Fate/Grand Order - Absolute Demonic Front: Babylonia (2019–2020)
- Fate/Grand Order Divine Realm of the Round Table: Camelot (2020–2021)
- Seven Knights Revolution: Hero Successor (2021)

=== Video games ===
- Macross 30: Voices across the Galaxy (2013)
- Fate/Extella Link (2018)
- The Hundred Line: Last Defense Academy (2025, individual scenarios)
