= Masashi Kishimoto =

Japanese manga artist (born 1974)

- 岸本 斉史
- Born: November 8, 1974 (age 52); Nagi, Okayama, Japan
- Education: Kyushu Sangyo University
- Occupation: Manga artist
- Years active: 1997–present
- Employer: Shueisha
- Notable work: Naruto
- Children: 1
- Relatives: Seishi Kishimoto (twin brother)
- Awards: Quill Award (2006)

Masashi Kishimoto (岸本 斉史, Kishimoto Masashi; born November 8, 1974) is a Japanese manga artist. His manga series, Naruto, which was in serialization from 1999 to 2014, has sold over 250 million copies worldwide in 46 countries as of May 2019. The series has been adapted into two anime and multiple films, video games, and related media. Besides the Naruto manga, Kishimoto also personally supervised the three anime films, Road to Ninja: Naruto the Movie, The Last: Naruto the Movie and Boruto: Naruto the Movie, and has written several one-shot stories. In 2019, Kishimoto wrote Samurai 8: The Tale of Hachimaru which ended in March 2020. From May 2016 through October 2020 he supervised the Boruto: Naruto Next Generations manga written by Ukyō Kodachi and illustrated by Mikio Ikemoto. In November 2020 it was announced that he had taken over as writer on the series, replacing Kodachi.

A reader of manga from a young age, Kishimoto showed a desire to write his own manga, citing authors Akira Toriyama and Katsuhiro Otomo as his main influences. As a result, Kishimoto spent several years working to write his own shōnen manga for Weekly Shōnen Jump magazine which he was a fan of.

== Early life ==
Masashi Kishimoto was born in Okayama Prefecture, Japan on November 8, 1974, as the older identical twin of Seishi Kishimoto. His home was close to Hiroshima where his grandfather originated. Kishimoto's grandfather often told him about stories of war and how it was related to grudges. During his childhood, Kishimoto showed interest in drawing characters from the anime shows he watched, such as Dr. Slump's Arale and Doraemon's titular protagonist.

In elementary school, Kishimoto started watching the Kinnikuman and Dragon Ball anime alongside his brother. During the following years, Kishimoto started idolizing Dragon Ball's creator Akira Toriyama, enjoying not only his series Dragon Ball and Dr. Slump, but also Dragon Quest, a series of role-playing video games for which Toriyama is the character designer. While he could not afford to buy Weekly Shōnen Jump where the Dragon Ball manga was published, he followed the series thanks to a friend from school who had subscribed to the magazine. By high school, Kishimoto started losing interest in manga as he started playing baseball and basketball, sports he practiced at his school. However, upon seeing a poster for the animated film Akira, Kishimoto became fascinated with the way the illustration was made and wished to imitate the series' creator Katsuhiro Otomo's style. Other series he enjoyed reading are Jin-Roh: The Wolf Brigade; Ninku; and Ghost in the Shell.

During his last years before graduating from Kyushu Sangyo University, Kishimoto spent time drawing manga and went to an art college with the hopes of becoming a manga artist. Upon entering college, Kishimoto decided he should try creating a Chanbara manga since Weekly Shōnen Jump had not published a title from that genre. However, during the same year, Kishimoto started reading Hiroaki Samura's Blade of the Immortal and Nobuhiro Watsuki's Rurouni Kenshin (the latter of which was published in Weekly Shonen Jump), which used the said genre. Kishimoto recalls having never been surprised by manga ever since reading Akira and found that he still was not able to compete against them.

In his second year of college, Kishimoto started drawing manga for magazine contests. However, he noted that his works were similar to seinen manga, aimed towards an adult demographic, rather than the shōnen manga read by children and teenagers. Wishing to write a manga for Shōnen Jump (which targets a young demographic), Kishimoto found his style unsuitable for the magazine. When watching the anime series Hashire Melos!, Kishimoto was surprised by the character designs employed by the animators and he started researching works from animators. He later met Tetsuya Nishio, the designer from the anime adaptation of the manga Ninku, whom he deemed a big influence. Having emulated the drawing style of multiple character designers from anime series, Kishimoto noted that his own style began to resemble that of shōnen series.

== Career ==
=== Early works ===
Kishimoto's first successful manga pilot was Karakuri (カラクリ, lit. 'Mechanism'), which he submitted to Shueisha in 1995. This earned him an honorable mention in Shueisha's monthly "Hop Step Award" in 1996, granted to promising rookie manga artists. At this point he was assigned an editor, Kosuke Yahagi, and worked on a number of rejected drafts including a slice-of-life manga, Michikusa (道くさ, lit. 'Wandering Detour'), and an action manga, Asian Punk (アジアンパンク, Ajian Panku). In 1997, he wrote a one-shot version of Naruto (NARUTO－ナルト－) which was published in Akamaru Jump Summer.

In December 1997, while redeveloping Karakuri for serialization, Kishimoto was offered a one-shot in Weekly Shōnen Jump. The new version of Karakuri debuted two weeks later in Weekly Shōnen Jump 1998 No. 4-5, but was hampered by the sudden deadline and performed poorly in reader surveys.

Following the failure of Karakuri, Kishimoto reduced his output and began moving in a seinen direction with drafts for a baseball manga, Yakyūō (野球王, lit. 'Baseball King'), and a mafia manga, Mario (マリオ), hoping to find better luck with a seinen magazine. Yahagi persuaded him to give the shōnen genre one last shot and Kishimoto began working on storyboards for a fantasy one-shot, Magic Mushroom (マジックマッシュルーム, Majikku Masshurūmu), but stopped when Yahagi called and asked him to instead develop storyboards for serialization. The two decided to submit a version of Naruto with a reworked story and world and produced storyboards for the first three chapters, winning a spot in the magazine. With a six-month lead time, Kishimoto repeatedly revised and redrew the first several chapters of the series.

=== Naruto ===
In September 1999, the serialized version of Naruto premiered in Weekly Shōnen Jump 1999 No. 43 and quickly became a hit. It ended on November 10, 2014, after more than 15 years of serialization, with a total of 700 chapters collected in 72 volumes. Sales have exceeded 113 million copies in Japan and over 95 million copies in the US, followed by over 93 million copies worldwide (outside Japan and United States) as of volume 36. This makes total sales for the series approximately 301 million copies.

Kishimoto was also the winner of "Rookie of the Year" for the series in the Agency for Cultural Affairs. It was adapted into two successful anime series, Naruto and Naruto Shippuden. Kishimoto requested that Tetsuya Nishio oversee the character designs of Naruto when the manga was adapted into an anime series. The Naruto manga series became one of Viz Media's top properties, accounting for nearly 10% of all manga sales in the US in 2006. The seventh volume of Viz's release became the first manga to ever win a Quill Award when it claimed the award for "Best Graphic Novel" in 2006.

War is a theme Kishimoto wanted to tell in the manga based on the Hiroshima crisis he was told from his grandfather. Despite understanding that war has no good side, Kishimoto wrote the concept of war in Naruto with a hopeful theme. Responding to Naruto's success, Kishimoto said in Naruto Collector Winter 2007/2008 that he was "very glad that the American audience has accepted an understood ninja. It shows that the American audience has good taste... because it means they can accept something previously unfamiliar to them." While writing the manga, Kishimoto met Eiichiro Oda, author of One Piece who he considered his rival. When Naruto ended, Oda left a message in the series' final volume acknowledging him as a rival. According to Kishimoto "That felt so gratifying."

Additionally, before the anime adaptation's premiere of My Hero Academia, he praised Kōhei Horikoshi's work, believing it would be a success overseas. Additionally, Kishimoto referred to Yoshihiro Togashi as one of his favorite artists.

For the video game Tekken 6, Kishimoto redesigned its new character, Lars Alexandersson. CyberConnect2 CEO Hiroshi Matsuyama said he was attracted by this design and thus asked the Tekken staff if he could include Lars in the video game Naruto Shippuden: Ultimate Ninja Storm 2. For Naruto Shippuden: Ultimate Ninja Storm Revolution, Kishimoto was responsible for Mecha Naruto upon being suggested by the staff to include a new character. Kishimoto decided on adding a character that would create a big impact worldwide, which resulted in Mecha Naruto. CyberConnect2 CEO Hiroshi Matsuyama was surprised when seeing the new character.

For the ninth Naruto film, Road to Ninja: Naruto the Movie, Kishimoto was responsible for both the story planning and the characters' designs. To promote the film, Kishimoto worked in Motion Comic Naruto, a DVD that showed scenes from the manga in 3D that was given to the first 1.5 million people who went to the cinema. Regarding Naruto's publication, Kishimoto told Tetsuya Nishio in July 2012 that the series would take over a year and a half to end. However, Kishimoto admitted that it now appears that the manga will continue beyond that timeframe.

Throughout 2014, Kishimoto supervised the film The Last: Naruto the Movie, which would act as a bridge connecting the series' conclusion and epilogue, providing the story concept and character designs. The Naruto series finally concluded on November 10, 2014, with The Last: Naruto the Movie premiering a month later on December 6, 2014.

Kishimoto also worked on several other projects during Naruto's serialization. In 2010, Kishimoto produced a one-shot baseball manga, Bench (ベンチ, Benchi), as part of Jump's "Top of the Super Legend" project, a series of six one-shot manga by famed Weekly Shōnen Jump artists. In April 2012, it was announced that Kishimoto would publish a one-shot version of his long-postponed mafia manga, Mario, in Jump Square, based on the rough, 160-page manuscript he began working on before Naruto became serialized. Throughout 2013, several of Kishimoto's one-shots saw their English-language debut in issues of the Weekly Shonen Jump digital magazine, including Mario, Bench, and the original Naruto pilot. In 2015, Kishimoto also illustrated the cover of violinist Chisako Takashima's album Strings on Fire.

=== After Naruto ===
Following Naruto's conclusion, Kishimoto became involved in the Start of a New Era Project commemorating both the manga's conclusion and 15th anniversary. On the last page of the final chapter, Weekly Shōnen Jump announced that a spin-off miniseries, also authored by Kishimoto, would be released in 2015. The miniseries, Naruto: The Seventh Hokage and the Scarlet Spring, ran from April to July 2015, leading up to the premiere of Boruto: Naruto the Movie on August 7, 2015, which he supervised and co-wrote with Ukyō Kodachi. He also illustrated several light novels set during the same time period as The Last. When asked by Boruto Uzumaki's voice actress Yūko Sanpei to continue making Naruto films, Kishimoto stated that he was taking a break and could not physically do so.

In August 2015, Kishimoto announced that he already has finalized what he wants to do for his next manga series. A sci-fi manga, the series will feature a unique protagonist, with Kishimoto having already completed the character designs. He plans for the work to surpass Naruto in quality, and plans to release the series monthly via the digital magazine Shonen Jump Plus due to the taxing effort required for a weekly series. Kishimoto had not yet finalized when he plans to officially announce the series, as he wants to spend time with his family.

On December 19, 2015, it was announced that Kishimoto would supervise the monthly Boruto: Naruto Next Generations (BORUTO−ボルト−) manga series beginning in Spring 2016. The new spinoff will be illustrated by Kishimoto's chief assistant on Naruto, Mikio Ikemoto, and written by his writing partner for Boruto: Naruto the Movie, Ukyo Kodachi. It was preceded by a Naruto: The Path Lit by the Full Moon one-shot written and illustrated by Kishimoto. In the June 10, 2019 issue of Weekly Shōnen Jump it was announced that Boruto: Naruto Next Generations would transition to the magazine's sister publication, V Jump, beginning with its June 20, 2019 issue.

In December 2017 at Jump Festa 2018 it was confirmed that Kishimoto was developing a new science fiction adventure series tentatively scheduled to debut in 2018. A year later at Jump Festa 2019 the series was formally announced as Samurai 8: The Tale of Hachimaru (サムライ8 八丸伝, Samurai Eito: Hachimaruden). Kishimoto will be handling the script and rough storyboards, while Akira Ōkubo, a former assistant on Naruto and brother of Atsushi Ōkubo, is responsible for illustrating the final manuscript. The series debuted in Weekly Shōnen Jump on May 13, 2019, as the magazine's first new series of Japan's Reiwa period, following a 4-page preview chapter on April 27, 2019, marking the end of the Heisei period. The series however failed to find an audience and concluded a year later in the 17th issue of Weekly Shōnen Jump on March 23, 2020.

In November 2020 it was announced that after 51 chapters and 13 volumes Kodachi would step down as writer of the Boruto: Naruto Next Generations manga, with Kishimoto assuming full writing duties and Ikemoto continuing as illustrator beginning with chapter 52 in the upcoming December issue of V Jump magazine, published on November 21, 2020.

== Works ==
=== Manga ===
- Karakuri (one-shot) (1995; Hop Step Award winner, published in Hop Step Award Selection 18 ('95~'96) (1996) and Akamaru Jump Winter (1997))
- Karakuri (December 21, 1997; debuted and canceled in Weekly Shōnen Jump #4–5, 1998)
- Bench (one-shot) (October 11, 2010, published in Weekly Shōnen Jump #45, 2010)
- Mario (one-shot) (May 2, 2013, published in the June 2013 issue of Jump Square)
- Samurai 8: The Tale of Hachimaru — creator, writer, storyboard artist (May 13, 2019 – March 23, 2020; serialized in Weekly Shōnen Jump; debuted in issue #24, 2019)

=== Naruto ===
==== Manga ====
- Naruto (one-shot) (1997; published in Akamaru Jump Summer (1997)
- Naruto (September 21, 1999 – November 10, 2014; serialized in Weekly Shōnen Jump; debuted in issue #43, 1999)
- Naruto: The Seventh Hokage and the Scarlet Spring (April 27, 2015 – July 6, 2015; serialized in Weekly Shōnen Jump, debuted in issue #22–23, 2015)
- Boruto: Road to B (one-shot) (August 17, 2015, published in Weekly Shōnen Jump #36, 2015) — collaboration between Kishimoto and Kenji Taira (author of Rock Lee SD)
- Naruto: The Path Lit by the Full Moon (one-shot) (April 25, 2016, published in Weekly Shōnen Jump #21–22, 2016)
- Boruto: Naruto Next Generations — editorial supervisor (volumes 1–13; May 9, 2016–November 2020), writer (volume 14–20; December 2020–May 2023) (serialized in Weekly Shōnen Jump (2016–19) and V Jump (2019–23); debuted in Weekly Shōnen Jump #23, 2016)
- Naruto: The Whorl Within the Spiral (one-shot) (July 18, 2023, published in Weekly Shōnen Jump #33, 2023)
- Boruto: Two Blue Vortex — writer and editorial supervisor (August 2023–present; serialized in V Jump; debuted in issue #10, 2023)

==== Motion comic ====
- Motion Comic: Naruto — 2012, designer

==== Anime films ====
- Road to Ninja: Naruto the Movie — 2012, story planning and original character designer
- The Last: Naruto the Movie — 2014, original story, original character designer and chief story supervisor
- Boruto: Naruto the Movie — 2015, original story, screenwriter, original character designer and chief production supervisor

==== Video games ====
- Tekken 6 — 2009, guest character designer
- Naruto Shippuden: Ultimate Ninja Storm Revolution — 2014, character designer and editorial supervisor

==== Artbooks ====
- The Art of Naruto: Uzumaki (岸本斉史画集 UZUMAKI, Kishimoto Masashi Gashū: Uzumaki; lit. 'Masashi Kishimoto Art Collection: Uzumaki') — 2004
- Paint Jump: Art of Naruto (PAINT JUMP Art of NARUTO－ナルト－) — 2008
- Naruto Illustration Book (NARUTO―ナルト―イラスト集 NARUTO, Naruto Irasuto-shū: Naruto; lit. 'Naruto Illustration Collection: Naruto') — 2010
- Uzumaki Naruto: Illustrations (NARUTO―ナルト―イラスト集 UZUMAKI NARUTO, Naruto Irasuto-shū: Uzumaki Naruto; lit. 'Naruto Illustration Collection: Naruto Uzumaki') — 2015

==== Guides ====
- Naruto Secret Manual, Book of Meetings: Official Character Data Book (2002)
- Naruto Secret Manual, Book of Soldiers: The Official Fanbook (2002)
- Naruto Secret Manual, Book of Conflict: Official Character Data Book (2005)
- Naruto Secret Manual, Book of People: Official Character Data Book (2008)
- Naruto Secret Manual, Book of Everyone: The Official Fanbook (2009)
- Naruto Secret Manual, Book of War: Official Character Data Book (2014)
- Naruto Secret Manual, Book of Formation: Official Movie Guidebook (2014)
- Naruto Secret Manual, Book of Nations: Official Movie Book (2015)
- Naruto Kizuna: The Words That Bind — Heaven Scroll (2013)
- Naruto Kizuna: The Words That Bind — Earth Scroll (2013)
- Boruto: Naruto Next Generations Story Guide — Before the Reversal (2026)

==== Novels ====
- Naruto: Hozuki Castle
- Naruto Jinraiden: The Day the Wolf Howled (NARUTO－ナルト－ 迅雷伝 狼の哭く日, Naruto Jinraiden: Ōkami no Naku Hi) — 2012, illustrator
- The Last: Naruto the Movie
- Boruto: Naruto the Movie

===== Jiraiya Ninja Scrolls series =====
- Naruto: Tales of a Gutsy Ninja (NARUTO―ナルト― ド根性忍伝, Naruto: Dokonjō Ninden) — 2010, illustrator, co-author
- Naruto: Tales of a Pure Ninja (NARUTO―ナルト―ド純情忍伝, Naruto: Dojunjō Ninden) — 2015, illustrator

===== Secret Stories series =====
- Naruto: Kakashi's Story — Lightning in the Frozen Sky (NARUTO－ナルト－ カカシ秘伝 氷天の雷, Naruto: Kakashi Hiden — Hyōten no Ikazuchi) — 2015, illustrator
- Naruto: Shikamaru's Story — A Cloud Drifting in the Silent Dark (NARUTO－ナルト－ シカマル秘伝 闇の黙に浮ぶ雲, Naruto: Shikamaru Hiden — Yami no Shijima ni Ukabu Kumo) — 2015, illustrator
- Naruto: Sakura's Story — Love Riding the Spring Breeze (NARUTO－ナルト－ サクラ秘伝 思恋、春風にのせて, Naruto: Sakura Hiden — Shiren, Harukaze ni Nosete) — 2015, illustrator
- Naruto: Konoha's Story — The Perfect Day for a Wedding (NARUTO－ナルト－ 木ノ葉秘伝 祝言日和, Naruto: Konoha Hiden — Shūgenbiyori) — 2015, illustrator
- Naruto: Gaara's Story — Sandstorm Mirage (NARUTO－ナルト－ 我愛羅秘伝 砂塵幻想, Naruto: Gaara Hiden — Sajingensō) — 2015, illustrator
- Naruto: Akatsuki's Story — Evil Flowers in Bloom (暁秘伝 咲き乱れる悪の華, Naruto: Akatsuki Hiden — Sakimidareru Aku no Hana) — 2015, illustrator

===== True Stories series =====
- Naruto: Itachi's Story — Daylight (NARUTO－ナルト－ イタチ真伝 光明篇, Naruto: Itachi Shinden Kōmyōhen) — 2015, illustrator
- Naruto: Itachi's Story — Midnight (NARUTO－ナルト－ イタチ真伝 暗夜篇, Naruto: Itachi Shinden An'yahen) — 2015, illustrator
- Naruto: Sasuke's Story — Sunrise (NARUTO－ナルト－ サスケ真伝 来光篇, Naruto: Sasuke Shinden Raikōhen) — 2015, illustrator

===== New Stories series =====
- Naruto: Konoha's Story — The Steam Ninja Scrolls (NARUTO－ナルト－ 木ノ葉新伝, Naruto: Konoha Shinden) — 2016, illustrator
- Naruto: Naruto's Story — Family Day (NARUTO－ナルト－ ナルト新伝, Naruto: Naruto Shinden) — 2016, illustrator
- Naruto: Sasuke's Story — Star Pupil (NARUTO－ナルト－ サスケ新伝, Naruto: Sasuke Shinden) — 2016, illustrator
- Naruto: Shikamaru's Story — Mourning Clouds (NARUTO－ナルト－ シカマル新伝, Naruto: Shikamaru Shinden) — 2016, illustrator

===== Intense Stories series =====
- Naruto: Kakashi's Story — The Sixth Hokage and the Failed Prince — 2019, illustrator
- Naruto: Sasuke's Story — The Uchiha and the Heavenly Stardust — 2019, illustrator
- Naruto: Naruto's Story — Uzumaki Naruto and the Spiral Destiny — 2019, illustrator

=== Other ===
- Strings on Fire by Chisako Takashima — 2015, special album cover artist
- Learning Japanese History Through Manga, Volume 1 — 2016, cover artist
- Learning Japanese History Through Manga, Volume 5 — 2016, cover artist

== Personal life ==
Kishimoto is the twin brother of Seishi Kishimoto, the author of 666 Satan and Blazer Drive. In 2003, Kishimoto married, but did not take a honeymoon with his wife until 2015 due to being busy with Naruto. In the making of The Last: Naruto the Movie, Kishimoto based the idea of Hinata Hyuga wanting to make a scarf for Naruto Uzumaki on how his wife had once done the same for him. The couple has one son.

== Influences and style ==
The first time Kishimoto used the double action technique in a fight between Naruto and Haku

While Kishimoto enjoyed reading manga as a child, he was inspired to write one after seeing a promotional image for the film Akira. This made him analyze the artwork of Akira's original author, Katsuhiro Otomo, as well as Akira Toriyama, another artist he admired. Realizing both had their own style regarding the designs, Kishimoto decided to draw manga while crafting his own images. While attending art school, Kishimoto was also an avid reader of Hiroaki Samura's Blade of the Immortal, and extensively studied Samura's page layouts, action sequences, and anatomical techniques.

When Kishimoto was originally creating the Naruto series, he looked to other shōnen manga for influences while attempting to make his characters as unique as possible. Kishimoto cites Akira Toriyama's Dragon Ball series as one of his influences, noting that Goku, the protagonist, was a key factor when creating Naruto Uzumaki due to his energetic and mischievous personality. Kishimoto cited The Matrix as an inspiration for the redesigned character outfits. He has also cited Yoshihiro Togashi as one of his favorite manga authors, while the manga Sasuke by Sanpei Shirato inspired Kishimoto in the developing Sasuke Uchiha.

Kishimoto has also cited other influences such as Takeshi Kitano and Quentin Tarantino. He also mentioned Michael Bay's technique "of shooting a scene against the background light" but found it difficult to make. Another technique inspired by Jackie Chan's films he used in the Naruto manga is the "double-action"; in this action, a punch is shown in three different angles in order to give a big impact on the punch's strength. This was first shown in Naruto Uzumaki's battle against Haku. Kishimoto sometimes draws panels as intentionally confusing during fight scenes to add a sense of speed. On the other hand, Kishimoto commented that for the fights between Naruto and Sasuke, he added action from the top of the page to the bottom in order for them to be easier to follow.

During the series' publication, Kishimoto got married and had children. The changes to his personal life affected the story as he made Naruto Uzumaki meet his parents, something the author wanted the character to feel based on his own experiences as a father.

When drawing the characters, Kishimoto consistently follows a five-step process: concept and rough sketch; drafting; inking; shading; and coloring. These steps are followed when he is drawing the manga and making the color illustrations that commonly adorn the cover of tankōbon; the cover of Weekly Shōnen Jump; or other media. The toolkit he uses occasionally changes. For instance, he used an airbrush for one illustration for a Weekly Shōnen Jump cover but decided not to use it for future drawings largely due to the cleanup required.

Masashi and his twin brother Seishi have been drawing manga together since early childhood; thus their styles are similar. As a result, each has been frequently accused of copying the other- not just artwork, but story elements as well. Seishi notes that the similarities are not intentional but are likely because they were influenced by many of the same things.

Kishimoto has admitted he made no plans in regards to the development of Naruto's story developments. For example, when introducing Sasuke, the character says he wants to kill a person named "Itachi" who he had to redesign a number of times. By this time, Kishimoto only thought that Sasuke's brother, Itachi, had done a wrong deed in the past but was not certain of what was exactly. By volume 16 of the series which featured Itachi's actual introduction, Kishimoto decided Itachi was an agent working for Konohagakure to kill all members from the Uchiha clan except Sasuke. This is later revealed in volume 43 of the manga. Another one was the revelation that the late Minato Namikaze would be Naruto's father. When Kishimoto had the idea that Minato would be Naruto's father, he started adding hints of that to the reader such as giving the Hokage mountain from Konohagakure spiky hair similar to Naruto's.

In the making of the film Boruto: Naruto the Movie Kishimoto paid tribute to several movies, the most notable being the 1996 film The Rock and the 2002 film Spider-Man. The tribute to The Rock was mostly done by using Kishōtenketsu, which is a common way of structuring stories in Japan. He also claimed he was a fan of Avi Arad, most notably his films based on the Spider-Man comic book character.
