= Mikio Ikemoto =

Japanese manga artist

Mikio Ikemoto (Japanese: 池本 幹雄, Hepburn: Ikemoto Mikio; born January 13, 1977) is a Japanese manga artist. He originally worked as the chief assistant for Masashi Kishimoto's manga series Naruto from 1999 to 2014. After its conclusion, Ikemoto was chosen to illustrate the 2016 sequel series, Boruto: Naruto Next Generations, working alongside writer Ukyō Kodachi.

== Biography and works ==
While Ikemoto's art style (right) is similar to Kishimoto's (left), the latter advised his former assistant to follow his own style for the Boruto manga.

As a child Ikemoto was a fan of Bikkuriman stickers. However, since he could not afford them, he instead drew his own stickers. Ikemoto's friends enjoyed them so much that they started buying stickers from him. By this point of his life, Ikemoto felt he had the talent for art.

In March 1997, Mikio Ikemoto submitted his first one-shot manga, titled Cosmos, to the manga magazine Weekly Shōnen Jump, for which he won a Tenkaichi Manga Award. The one-shot was later published in the July 7 issue of the magazine, gaining a small cult following despite its mature subject matter. Cosmos was then serialized in Monthly Plasma, an independent manga magazine, from June 1997 to September 1999, and a sequel one-shot was published in the April 26, 1999, issue of Weekly Shōnen Jump.

By this time Ikemoto had become interested in the work of fellow rookie manga artist Masashi Kishimoto. Upon hearing that Ikemoto had been contacted by Shueisha to work as an assistant on a comedy series and was moving to Tokyo, Kishimoto felt that his art would be wasted on that genre. With work beginning on the Naruto serialization, Kishimoto asked his editor, Kosuke Yahagi, to scout Ikemoto and recruit him as an assistant. Ikemoto was grateful for the offer, since he felt that Naruto's genre was what he had originally wanted to work on, and accepted the job, beginning work with the seventh chapter. During the early days of making Naruto, Ikemoto was Kishimoto's youngest assistant, and the latter jokingly said this made him and his other assistants envious. Ikemoto's responsibilities included drawing crowds and background figures, adding white to speed lines, highlights and characters' eyes, whiting out art that went out of the panels, putting stars in night skies, and adding in half-tones. He was also occasionally tasked with creating the designs for new characters. Ikemoto recalls how often Kishimoto requested his help with adding more details to the manga chapters, leading him to draw more clones created by Naruto Uzumaki as well as an unspecified character who could become giant.

When the manga ended in 2014, Shueisha asked Kishimoto to start a sequel. However, Kishimoto rejected the idea and proposed that Ikemoto draw it based on the experience he had. Kishimoto advised Ikemoto not to imitate his art style and instead make his own. While noting long-time fans might be disappointed with the fact that Kishimoto is not drawing Boruto, Ikemoto stated he would do his best in the making of the manga. Ikemoto mentioned he remained optimistic about his art style. Kishimoto also revises the manga's scenario. Besides illustrating the manga, Ikemoto also provides illustrations for the Boruto light novels. The manga had one million copies in print as of January 2017 while Studio Pierrot also produced an anime series based on it.

== Style ==
Aside from Naruto, Ikemoto said his art was influenced by Kinnikuman and particularly Dragon Ball. He noted that the lack of tone in Akira Toriyama's art makes drawing easier and said he still uses Dragon Ball as a reference for his own action scenes. Ikemoto admitted he is pretty bad at drawing comedy, but also noted that the way the story of Boruto has evolved does not lend itself well to comedy. While feeling honored to create the art for Boruto, Ikemoto stated he feels grateful that the series is released monthly rather than weekly due to the stress the latter could bring since the required amount of pages is nearly 20 per chapter. However, Ikemoto still finds the monthly serialization challenging. Regular chapters of Boruto tend to surpass 40 pages, with one week required to create the thumbnails and 20 days to produce the pages while the rest of the time is used for coloring or giving the chapters other touches. His drawing methods involve Criterium mechanical pencil on IC's paper for the sketches. He uses ink for finished drawings. Despite the differences between their art styles, Ikemoto uses Copic's markers for the colored pages, similarly to how Kishimoto did with Naruto.

The Boruto anime's director Hiroyuki Yamashita said he enjoys Ikemoto's style, praising his oblong landscape layout for frames. He found Ikemoto's style more realistic than Kishimoto's due to the former's attention to the character designs' details. He also pointed out that Ikemoto's way of illustrating Momoshiki Otsutsuki's new appearance after consuming Kinshiki Otsutsuki surprised him due to how different it was compared to the original design from the Boruto movie. Amy McNulty of Anime News Network shared similar comments, particularly regarding the way Ikemoto's art resembles Kishimoto's as well as how well-illustrated his fight scenes are. Manga author Yoshihiro Togashi stated he enjoyed Ikemoto's artwork, praising his style.
