= Naruto (TV series) =

Japanese anime television series

- Naruto logo Naruto: Shippuden English version logo

NARUTO(ナルト)
- Genre: Adventure; Fantasy comedy; Martial arts
- Anime television series
- Directed by: Hayato Date
- Produced by: Ken Hagino; Tomoko Gushima (#1–98); Noriko Kobayashi (#99–220)
- Written by: Katsuyuki Sumisawa (#1–135); Junki Takegami (#136–220)
- Music by: Musashi Project; Toshio Masuda
- Studio: Studio Pierrot
- Licensed by: Crunchyroll (Note: In Australia through Madman Anime.); NA: Viz Media; UK: Anime Limited
- Original network: TXN (TV Tokyo)
- English network: AU: Network Ten, ABC3; AUS: Cartoon Network (Toonami); BI: Jetix; CA: YTV, Télétoon; IN: Cartoon Network, Sony YAY!; NA: Neon Alley; PH: Cartoon Network; SEA: Animax; US: Cartoon Network/Adult Swim (Toonami), Starz; ZA: SABC 2
- Original run: October 3, 2002 – February 8, 2007
- Episodes: 220
- Anime television series

Naruto: Shippuden
- Directed by: Hayato Date (#1–479); Masaaki Kumagai (#261–280); Yasuaki Kurotsu (Note: Pseudonym for Toshiyuki Tsuru) (#290–295) (Note: Credited as series director (シリ– ズディレクタ –)); Osamu Kobayashi (#480–483); Chiaki Kon (#484–488); Toshinori Watabe (#489–493); Masahiko Murata (#494–500)
- Produced by: Tomoko Gushima (#1–48); Ken Hagino (#1–53); Fukashi Azuma (#49–219); Naoji Hōnokidani (#54–479); Makoto Shiraishi (#220–281); Makoto Hijikata (#282–500); Kōichi Machiyama (#480–500)
- Written by: Junki Takegami (#1–289, #296–479); Satoru Nishizono (#1–53); Yasuyuki Suzuki (#54–71, #432–450); Yasuaki Kurotsu (#290–295) (Note: Credited as conception work (コンセプトワ – ク)); Katsuhiko Chiba (#451–458); Shin Yoshida (#459–468); Masanao Akahoshi (#484–488) (Note: Credited as composition (構成)); Masaya Honda (#489–493); Kento Shimoyama (#494–500)
- Music by: Yasuharu Takanashi; Yaiba
- Studio: Studio Pierrot
- Licensed by: Crunchyroll; NA: Viz Media; UK: Anime Limited
- Original network: TXN (TV Tokyo)
- English network: AUS: Cartoon Network; NA: Neon Alley; PH: ABS-CBN, Hero, Yey!; SEA: Animax; US: Disney XD, Adult Swim (Toonami); ZA: SABC 2
- Original run: February 15, 2007 – March 23, 2017
- Episodes: 500
- Anime television series

Naruto × Ninku
- Directed by: Noriyuki Abe
- Written by: Masaya Honda
- Music by: Yasuharu Takanashi; Yaiba; Yusuke Honma
- Studio: Pierrot Films
- Related works
- Naruto (manga); Boruto; Rock Lee & His Ninja Pals; Other related Naruto media
- icon

Naruto (Note: Japanese: NARUTO(ナルト)) is a Japanese anime television series based on Masashi Kishimoto's 1999–2014 manga series Naruto. It follows Naruto Uzumaki, a young orphan ninja who seeks recognition from his peers and dreams of becoming the Hokage, the leader of the Village Hidden in the Leaves. Like the manga, the anime series is divided into two separate parts: the first series retains the original manga's title and is set in the world of ninjas. The second series, a direct sequel titled Naruto: Shippuden, (Note: Japanese: NARUTO(ナルト) 疾風伝) takes place during Naruto's teens. Both anime series were animated by Studio Pierrot, produced by Aniplex, and licensed by Viz Media in North America.

The first anime series aired on TV Tokyo and ran for 220 episodes from October 2002 to February 2007. An English dub produced by Viz Media aired on Cartoon Network and YTV from September 2005 to December 2009. The second series, Naruto: Shippuden, also aired on TV Tokyo and ran for 500 episodes from February 2007 to March 2017. The English dub of Naruto: Shippuden was broadcast on Disney XD in the United States from October 2009 to November 2011, airing the first 98 episodes before eventually switching over to Adult Swim's Toonami programming block in January 2014 to September 2024, starting over from the first episode. After Disney XD removed the series from broadcast, Viz Media began streaming new English dubbed episodes on their streaming service Neon Alley in December 2012 starting at episode 99. The service ended its run in March 2016 after 338 episodes due to its shutdown a month later. Besides the anime television series, Pierrot also developed 11 animated films and 12 original video animations.

The anime series achieved significant commercial success, becoming one of Viz Media's top-earning franchise and being a cultural impact with the run of the series. It was the third most-watched series in the United States by 2020. Critically, it received mixed reception; its adaptation of Kishimoto's art style, as well as the bloated story pacing, was not received well. However, the fight scenes, character dynamics, and emotional depth received critical acclaim. Naruto: Shippuden was consistently ranked as one of the most-watched shows in Japan. It was lauded for its improved animation, more mature tone, well-crafted character interactions, and balanced storytelling. The first anime ranked 38th in IGN's Top 100 Animated Series and Shippuden earned a nomination from the Crunchyroll Anime Awards for Best Continuing Series. Viz Media sold over three million anime home video units by 2019.

== Series overview ==
=== Part I ===
A demonic nine-tailed fox called Kurama attacks Konoha, the Village Hidden in the Leaves in the Land of Fire, one of the Five Great Shinobi Countries in the Ninja World. In response, the leader of the Leaf, Fourth Hokage Minato Namikaze, sacrifices his life by splitting the fox in half and sealing the fox inside himself and in the body of his newborn son, Naruto Uzumaki, respectively, making him a host of the beast. (Note: The host is known as a jinchuriki in the story. The secret that the fourth Hokage who sealed the beast in Naruto is his father is revealed in Part II. It is a human being in the Ninja World who has a Tailed Beast inside of them. A Tailed Beast is a giant creature that contains a large amount of chakra (energy) inside of their bodies.) The Third Hokage, Hiruzen Sarutobi, returns from retirement to become the leader of the Leaf again. Naruto is often scorned by Konoha's villagers for being the host of the Nine-Tails. Due to a decree by the Third Hokage forbidding any mention of these events, Naruto learns nothing about the Nine-Tails until 12 years later, when Mizuki, a renegade ninja, reveals the truth to him. Naruto defeats Mizuki in combat, earning the respect of his teacher, Iruka Umino. (Note: In Naruto, a jutsu is a skill or a technique involving supernatural abilities.)

Shortly afterward, Naruto becomes a ninja and joins with Sasuke Uchiha and Sakura Haruno to form Team 7, under an experienced sensei, the elite ninja Kakashi Hatake. Like all the ninja teams from every village, Team 7 completes missions requested by the villagers, ranging from doing chores and being bodyguards.

After several missions, including a major one in the Land of Waves, Kakashi allows Team 7 to take what is known as the Chunin Exams, enabling ninja to advance to a higher rank and take on more difficult missions. During the exams, Orochimaru, a wanted criminal, invades Konoha. The Third Hokage subsequently sacrifices his life to disable Orochimaru from permanently performing jutsus using his hands. Jiraiya, one of the three legendary Sannin, declines the title of Fifth Hokage and searches with Naruto for Tsunade, another Sannin, whom he chooses to become Fifth Hokage instead.

During the search it is revealed that Orochimaru wishes to train Sasuke because of his powerful genetic heritage, the Sharingan. (Note: The Sharingan (写輪眼; lit. 'Copy Wheel Eye'; English manga: 'Mirror Wheel Eye') is a special ability of the eye that the Uchiha clan holds. The Sharingan can copy any type of jutsu, can see rapid movements, and can cast an illusion on its victim, and Sasuke being the last member of his clan as he holds the Sharingan.) After Sasuke attempts and fails to kill his older brother Itachi, (Note: He destroyed their clan and joined a criminal organization called Akatsuki.) who had shown up in Konoha to kidnap Naruto, he joins Orochimaru, hoping to gain from him the strength needed to kill Itachi. The story takes a turn when Sasuke leaves the village: Tsunade sends a group of ninja, including Naruto, to retrieve Sasuke, but Naruto is unable to persuade or force him to come back. Naruto and Sakura do not give up on Sasuke; Naruto leaves Konoha to receive training from Jiraiya to prepare himself for the next time he encounters Sasuke, while Sakura becomes Tsunade's apprentice.

=== Part II ===
Two and a half years later, Naruto returns from his training with Jiraiya, just as the Akatsuki start kidnapping the hosts of the powerful Tailed Beasts. Team Kakashi and other Leaf ninja fight against them and search for their teammate Sasuke. The Akatsuki succeeds in capturing and extracting, subsequently killing, seven of the nine Tailed Beasts. Gaara, who previously had the One-Tails, survived after a Sand ninja sacrifices their life for Gaara. Meanwhile, Sasuke betrays and kills Orochimaru and faces Itachi to take revenge. After Itachi dies in battle due to an unknown illness, Sasuke learns from the Akatsuki founder Tobi that Itachi had been ordered by Konoha's superiors to destroy his clan to prevent a coup; he accepted, on the condition that Sasuke would be spared. Devastated by this revelation, Sasuke joins the Akatsuki to destroy Konoha in revenge. As Konoha ninja defeat several Akatsuki members, the Akatsuki figurehead leader, Nagato, kills Jiraiya and devastates Konoha, but Naruto defeats and redeems him, earning the village's respect and admiration.

With Nagato's death, Tobi, disguised as Madara Uchiha (one of Konoha's founding fathers), announces that he wants to capture all nine Tailed Beasts to cast an illusion powerful enough to control all humanity and achieve world peace. The leaders of the five ninja villages refuse to help him and instead join forces to confront his faction and allies. That decision results in a Fourth Shinobi World War between the combined armies of the Five Great Countries which totaled up to 80,000 shinobis. It was known as the Allied Shinobi Forces. The Akatsuki's forces consisted of Reanimated shinobi and 100,000 White Zetsu clones. The Five Kage try to conceal the breakout of the war to Naruto by keeping him in a secret island turtle near Kumogakure, or the Village Hidden in the Clouds, but Naruto finds out and escapes from the island with Killer Bee, the host of the Eight-Tails. At that time, Naruto—along with the help of Killer Bee—gains control of his Tailed Beast and the two of them head for the battlefield.

During the conflict, it is revealed that Tobi is Obito Uchiha, a former teammate of Kakashi's who was thought to be dead. The real Madara saved Obito's life, and they have since collaborated. As Sasuke learns the history of Konoha, including the circumstances that led to his clan's downfall, he decides to protect the village and rejoins Naruto and Sakura to thwart Madara and Obito's plans. However, Madara's body ends up possessed by Kaguya Otsutsuki, an ancient princess who intends to subdue all humanity. A reformed Obito sacrifices himself to help the Allies to stop her. Once Kaguya is sealed, Madara dies as well. Sasuke takes advantage of the situation and takes control of all the Tailed Beasts, as he reveals his goal of ending the current village system. Naruto confronts Sasuke to dissuade him from his plan, and after they almost kill each other in a final battle, Sasuke admits defeat and reforms. After the war, Kakashi becomes the Sixth Hokage and pardons Sasuke, Orochimaru, and Kabuto for their crimes. Years later, Kakashi steps down while Naruto marries Hinata Hyuga and becomes the Seventh Hokage, raising the next generation.

== Voice cast and characters ==
Character	Japanese	English (Viz Media)
Naruto Uzumaki	Junko Takeuchi	Maile Flanagan
Sasuke Uchiha	Noriaki Sugiyama	Yuri Lowenthal
Sakura Haruno	Chie Nakamura	Kate Higgins
Kakashi Hatake	Kazuhiko Inoue	Dave Wittenberg
Rock Lee	Yōichi Masukawa	Brian Donovan
Shikamaru Nara	Showtaro Morikubo	Tom Gibis
Hinata Hyuga	Nana Mizuki	Stephanie Sheh
Ino Yamanaka	Ryoka Yuzuki	Colleen O'Shaughnessey
Choji Akimichi	Kentarō Itō	Robbie Rist
Neji Hyuga	Koichi Tochika	Steve Staley
Kiba Inuzuka	Kosuke Toriumi	Kyle Hebert
Shino Aburame	Shinji Kawada	Derek Stephen Prince
Tenten	Yukari Tamura	Danielle Judovits
Might Guy	Masashi Ebara	Skip Stellrecht
Gaara	Akira Ishida	Liam O'Brien
Orochimaru	Kujira	Steve Blum
Jiraiya	Hōchū Ōtsuka	David Lodge
Tsunade	Masako Katsuki	Debi Mae West
Itachi Uchiha	Hideo Ishikawa	Crispin Freeman
Obito Uchiha	Wataru Takagi	Michael Yurchak
Nagato	Junpei Morita	Vic Mignogna
Madara Uchiha	Naoya Uchida	Neil Kaplan
Minato Namikaze	Toshiyuki Morikawa	Tony Oliver

== Production and release ==
=== Part I (2002–07) ===
The first Naruto anime series, directed by Hayato Date, and produced by Studio Pierrot and TV Tokyo, aired in Japan from October 3, 2002, to February 8, 2007. The first 135 episodes were adapted from Part I of the manga, and the remaining 85 episodes are original and use plot elements excluded in the manga. Tetsuya Nishio was the character designer for Naruto when the manga was adapted into an anime series. Kishimoto had requested that Nishio be given this role. Beginning on April 29, 2009, the original Naruto anime began a rerun on Wednesdays and Thursdays (until the fourth week of September 2009 when it changed to only Wednesdays). It was remastered in HD, with new 2D and 3D effects, under the name Naruto: Shōnen Hen (Note: NARUTO(ナルト) 少年篇; "Naruto: Youth Version"). Episodes from the series were released on both VHS and DVD, and collected as boxed sets.

Viz licensed the anime series for broadcast and distribution in the Region 1 market. The English dub of the anime began airing on September 10, 2005, and ended on January 31, 2009, with 209 episodes aired on Cartoon Network's Toonami block in the United States. The episodes were also broadcast on YTV's Bionix (Canada), Jetix (United Kingdom) and SABC 2's (South Africa) programming blocks, and were released on DVD on March 28, 2006. On August 25, 2017, Starz announced that they would be offering episodes of the series for their Video on Demand service starting September 1, 2017. The first 26 volumes contain four episodes; later DVD volumes have five episodes. Uncut editions were released in DVD box sets, each containing 12–15 episodes, with some variation based on story arcs. In the American broadcast, references to alcohol, Japanese culture, sexual innuendo, and the appearance of blood and death were sometimes edited. The DVD editions contained the uncensored visuals. One of the censored scenes was the accidental kiss between Naruto and Sasuke, fitting in the long trend of removing content that alludes to homosexual relationships. The series was also licensed to Hulu, Joost, and Crunchyroll, which aired the episodes online with the original Japanese audio tracks and English subtitles. On June 1, 2017, it was announced that an HD remaster version of the original anime television series would debut on Japanese TV on June 24, starting with the show's first episode. Anime Limited released the series in a "Collector's Blu-ray" edition in the United Kingdom and Ireland in 2024.

=== Part II: Shippuden (2007–17) ===
The second anime series, titled Naruto: Shippuden, (Note: NARUTO(ナルト) 疾風伝, Naruto Shippūden; lit. "Naruto: Hurricane Chronicles") produced by Studio Pierrot and directed by Hayato Date, is a direct sequel to the first Naruto anime series. It corresponds to Part II of the manga. It aired on TV Tokyo from February 15, 2007, to March 23, 2017. On January 8, 2009, TV Tokyo aired new episodes via internet streaming to monthly subscribers. Each streamed episode was available online within an hour of its Japanese release and includes English subtitles.

Viz began streaming English subtitled episodes on January 2, 2009, on the series's website, including episodes that had already been released as well as new episodes from Japan. In the United States, the English dub of Naruto: Shippuden premiered weekly on Disney XD from October 28, 2009, up until episode 98 on November 5, 2011. Episodes 99 through 338 premiered uncut on the anime web channel Neon Alley until it was closed on May 4, 2016. The anime series aired on Adult Swim's Toonami programming block on January 5, 2014, where it aired on a weekly basis.

The series was released on Region 2 DVD in Japan with four or five episodes per disk. There are four series of DVD releases divided by story arc. There was a special feature included with the seventh Naruto: Shippuden compilation DVD called Hurricane! "Konoha Academy" Chronicles. Kakashi Chronicles: Boys' Life on the Battlefield (Note: カカシ外伝～戦場のボーイズライフ～, Kakashi Gaiden Senjō no Bōizu Raifu) was released on December 16, 2009; featuring episodes 119–120, the story revolves around Kakashi Hatake's childhood.

The first North American DVD of the series was released on September 29, 2009. Only the first 53 episodes were made available in this format before it ended with the 12th volume on August 10, 2010. Subsequent episodes were released as part of DVD boxed sets, beginning with the first season on January 26, 2010. In the United Kingdom, the series was licensed by Manga Entertainment who released the first DVD collection on June 14, 2010. Anime Limited released the series in a "Collector's Blu-ray" edition in the United Kingdom and Ireland in 2024.

=== Subsequent work ===
A series of four "brand-new" episodes, to commemorate the original anime's 20th anniversary, were originally scheduled to premiere on September 3, 2023. In August of that year, it was announced the premiere had been postponed. In September 2026, Viz Media announced that the Naruto franchise would receive a new "limited" anime television series. On October 10, 2026, the Naruto: What's Next? panel at New York Comic Con announced that the series will consist of a crossover with Ninku, titled Naruto × Ninku. It will be animated by Pierrot Films and directed by Noriyuki Abe, with series composition by Masaya Honda, and Tetsuya Nishio, who worked on both the Ninku and Naruto anime series, will serve as character designer and chief animation director.

== Episodes ==
Naruto

Season	Episodes	Originally released	
Season	Episodes	First released	Last released
1	35	October 3, 2002	May 28, 2003
2	48	June 4, 2003	May 12, 2004
3	48	May 19, 2004	April 20, 2005
4	48	April 27, 2005	April 5, 2006
5	41	April 12, 2006	February 8, 2007

Naruto: Shippuden

Season	Episodes	Originally released	
Season	Episodes	First released	Last released
1	32	February 15, 2007	October 25, 2007
2	21	November 8, 2007	April 3, 2008
3	18	April 3, 2008	August 14, 2008
4	17	August 21, 2008	December 11, 2008
5	24	December 18, 2008	June 4, 2009
6	31	June 11, 2009	January 14, 2010
7	8	January 21, 2010	March 11, 2010
8	24	March 25, 2010	August 26, 2010
9	21	September 2, 2010	January 27, 2011
10	25	February 10, 2011	July 28, 2011
11	21	July 28, 2011	December 28, 2011
12	33	January 5, 2012	August 16, 2012
13	20	August 23, 2012	January 10, 2013
14	25	January 17, 2013	July 4, 2013
15	28	July 18, 2013	January 30, 2014
16	13	February 6, 2014	May 8, 2014
17	11	May 15, 2014	August 14, 2014
18	21	August 21, 2014	December 25, 2014
19	20	January 8, 2015	May 21, 2015
20	45	May 28, 2015	April 28, 2016
21	21	May 5, 2016	October 13, 2016
22	21	October 20, 2016	March 23, 2017

== Films ==
Naruto was adapted into 11 theatrical films. The first three films correspond to the first anime series, and the remaining eight correspond to the second.

1. Naruto the Movie: Ninja Clash in the Land of Snow (2004). Team 7 travels to the Land of Snow to protect the actors during the shooting of Yukie's film.
2. Naruto the Movie: Legend of the Stone of Gelel (2005). Naruto, Shikamaru, and Sakura go on a ninja mission involving them in a war between the Sunaga village and a large force of armored warriors. Unlike its predecessor, Legend of the Stone of Gelel did not have a theatrical release in the United States. It was released in direct-to-video format instead.
3. Naruto the Movie: Guardians of the Crescent Moon Kingdom (2006). Naruto, Sakura, Lee, and Kakashi are assigned to protect the future prince of the Land of Moon, Hikaru Tsuki.
4. Naruto Shippuden the Movie (2007). Naruto goes on a mission to protect the priestess Shion, who makes visions about his death.
5. Naruto Shippuden the Movie: Bonds (2008). Naruto and Sasuke are forced to join forces when ninja from the Sky Country attack Konoha.
6. Naruto Shippuden the Movie: The Will of Fire (2009). Team 7 works to prevent Kakashi from sacrificing himself and ending the war.
7. Naruto Shippuden the Movie: The Lost Tower (2010). Naruto is sent 20 years into the past as he explores a mystical tower to capture a rogue ninja and discovers the Fourth Hokage Minato Namikaze, his father, alive in the timeline.
8. Naruto the Movie: Blood Prison (2011). Naruto is framed for attempted murder of the Raikage. While attempting to escape from prison, he discovers its real secrets.
9. Road to Ninja: Naruto the Movie (2012). Naruto and Sakura are sent to an alternate universe by Tobi, and discover the meaning of companionship and parenthood. The story planning and character designs were created by Kishimoto.
10. The Last: Naruto the Movie (2014). (Note: The film is set two years after the conclusion of the manga.) Naruto and his companions try to stop the moon from colliding with Earth. The film takes place two years after the Fourth Great Ninja War and explains some loose ends involving the series's mythology, and focuses on the relationship between Naruto and Hinata. Kishimoto served as the film's chief story supervisor, story writer, and character designer.
11. Boruto: Naruto the Movie (2015). (Note: The film is set fifteen years after the conclusion of the manga.) The film focuses on the children of the main characters, mainly Boruto Uzumaki, who trains with his father's best friend and former rival Sasuke Uchiha to surpass him. Kishimoto served as the film's chief production supervisor, screenwriter, and character designer.

== OVAs ==
There are 12 original video animations (OVAs) in Naruto.

1. Find the Crimson Four-Leaf Clover! (2002). Naruto, Konohamaru, and his friends, go on a mission to retrieve a four leaf clover that makes a wish come true.
2. Mission: Protect the Waterfall Village! (2003). Naruto, Sasuke, Sakura, and Kakashi, are on a mission to escort a ninja to his hometown. This and the previous OVA were later released on DVD in Australia under the title Naruto Jump Festa Collection. The English localization of Mission: Protect the Waterfall Village! was released on DVD by Viz on May 22, 2007, in the United States under the title Naruto – The Lost Story.
3. Hidden Leaf Village Grand Sports Festival (2004). Multiple groups of ninjas, including Team 7, participate in a sports competition where the award is a week break from missions.
4. Finally a clash! Jonin VS Genin!! Indiscriminate grand melee tournament meeting!! (2005) Fifth Hokage Tsunade creates a competition between Jonin (high level ninja) and Genin (low level ninja). Released on a bonus disk with the Japanese edition of the Naruto: Ultimate Ninja 3 video game for the PlayStation 2.
5. Hurricane! "Konoha Academy" Chronicles (2008). This OVA follows Naruto and his peers, as they attend high school.
6. Naruto: The Cross Roads (2009). Focuses on Team 7, after their encounter with Zabuza and Haku.
7. Naruto, The Genie, and The Three Wishes!! (2010). While Team 7 are at the beach, Naruto finds a bottle and opens it to find a genie who grants three wishes.
8. Naruto x UT (2011). Naruto is defeated by Sasuke and is pronounced dead; the events leading to the combat are shown in flashback.
9. Chūnin Exam on Fire! Naruto vs. Konohamaru! (2011). Naruto and Konohamaru are participants in the Chunin Exams, and are matched with each other; they fight with no limits.
10. Hashirama Senju vs. Madara Uchiha (2012). Tobi narrates the origin of Konoha. In the beginning, ninjas fought for their own clans. The most powerful among them are two clans: the Senju led by Hashirama, and the Uchiha led by Madara. This was distributed as part of the Naruto Shippuden: Ultimate Ninja Storm Generations video game for the PlayStation 3 and Xbox 360.
11. Naruto Shippūden: Sunny Side Battle!!! (2014). In his sleep, Sasuke dreams of his brother Itachi making him breakfast repeatedly until it is perfect.
12. The Day Naruto Became Hokage (2016). Naruto is officially the Seventh Hokage, but does not make it to the ceremony due to an incident that occurred in the Uzumaki Residence.

== Music ==
Musashi Project and Toshio Masuda composed and arranged the Naruto soundtracks. Naruto Original Soundtrack was released on April 3, 2003, and contains 22 tracks used during the first season of the anime. This was followed by Naruto Original Soundtrack II, released on March 18, 2004, which includes 19 tracks. The third, Naruto Original Soundtrack III, was released on April 27, 2005, with 23 tracks. Two soundtracks containing all the opening and ending themes of the series, titled Naruto: Best Hit Collection and Naruto: Best Hit Collection II were released on November 17, 2004, and August 2, 2006. Eight tracks from the series were selected and released on a CD called Naruto in Rock -The Very Best Hit Collection Instrumental Version- released on December 19, 2007. Soundtracks for the three movies based on the first anime series were available for sale near their release dates. On October 12, 2011, a CD collecting the themes from Naruto Shōnen Hen was released. Various CD series were released with voice actors performing original episodes.

The soundtracks of Naruto: Shippuden were produced by Yasuharu Takanashi and his musical unit, Yaiba; they were titled Naruto Shippūden Original Soundtrack I, II, and III, and were released in 2007, 2009, and 2016. Naruto All Stars, released in 2008, consists of 10 original Naruto songs remixed and sung by characters from the series. Ten themes from the two anime series were collected in the DVD box Naruto Super Hits 2006–2008, which appeared in 2008. Soundtracks from the Shippuden films have also been released, with the first one available in 2007. A final one composed of the series is set to be released in late 2017 with Aniplex having started a survey of all Naruto and Naruto: Shippuden themes to be included in the CD.

The theme for the Cartoon Network English version was performed by former Saban Entertainment composer Jeremy Sweet, who had previously worked on themes for the Power Rangers franchise, the English adaptation of Dragon Ball Z and various other Saban programs. It was co-composed by Ian Nickus, another former musician from the company.

== Reception ==
=== Popularity ===
Laura Takaragawa, Viz Media's vice president of product licensing, stated that Naruto is "the most recognizable anime in the world, especially outside of Japan." In 2024, TheToyZone's data analysts identified Naruto as the most popular kids' TV show in 83 countries worldwide. In December 2009, Google announced its Google Zeitgeist search trends. In the Entertainment category, Naruto Shippuden was the fourth most-searched term, behind only Michael Jackson, Transformers, and Eminem. In December 2023, it was announced that Naruto was the most-searched anime on Google in the past 25 years. In 2025, the series received a dedicated Easter egg on Google Search.

According to a survey published in 2019 by Tokio Marine Nichido and NTT Data, which revealed the destinations sought by foreign visitors coming to Japan, specifically to go on "anime pilgrimages", Naruto, Tokushima, known for its whirlpools, was the most talked about globally, with over 880,000 mentions. Although the city is not the setting for the series, the city government and the Japan Chamber of Commerce and Industry have organized events playing on the pun between the series and the city's name, attracting both Japanese visitors and foreigners.

On June 22, 2026, the TBS's variety show Professional Ranking announced the results of its "Top 100 Greatest Japanese Anime Songs". The rankings were based on votes from 166 music professionals around the world. Naruto Shippuden's third opening theme song, "Blue Bird" by Ikimonogakari, ranked second; the 16th opening theme song, "Silhouette" by Kana-Boon, ranked 75th; and Naruto's fourth opening theme song, "Go" by Flow, ranked 84th.

=== Sales and ratings ===
The US premiere of Naruto on Cartoon Network's Toonami block in September 2005 received strong ratings and increased viewership among the network's target audience of children ages 6–11 and tweens ages 9–14. In 2011, Naruto helped Viz Media generate $200 million in annual licensed merchandise sales. By 2019, Viz Media has sold more than 3 million Naruto anime home video units, and the anime was the top digital streaming performer on Hulu. Naruto: Shippuden has been ranked several times as one of the most watched series in Japan. Naruto has also been the top-earning (gross profit) anime franchise for TV Tokyo (surpassed by Pokémon in 2011 and Yo-kai Watch in 2015) due to strong overseas and domestic sales. (Note: Ranking for each year: 2011; 2012; 2013; 2014; 2015; 2016; 2017; 2018; 2019; 2020; 2021) According to Crunchyroll, Naruto Shippuden was the most-watched anime worldwide of the 2010s, and was particularly the most watched in North America, the Middle East, Asia, and Oceania. In China, Naruto has received billions of streaming views by 2020. In 2020, Naruto was the third most-watched children's animated series on Netflix in the United States.

=== Critical reception ===
Mike Hale of The New York Times described the Naruto anime as much better than American animation shows aimed at children. The visuals received criticism from both THEM Anime Reviews critics: Christina Carpenter felt Kishimoto's artistic style translated poorly into animation, and Derrick Tucker felt that at their best, the depictions "[left] little to be desired". As with the manga, some reviewers, such as Theron Martin of Anime News Network, along with Tucker, felt there were too many fight scenes. Justin Rich argued that the fight scenes were the most important and enjoyable element of the show. Carpenter commented positively on the characters, though she felt that most were fairly typical. Hiroshi Matsuyama further reflected the anime's 133rd episode to be one of his favorites, including the action sequences between Naruto and Sasuke, and the emotional value displayed.

Naruto: Shippuden was well-reviewed by Activeanime's David C. Jones who commented that the animation had improved. Carl Kimlinger of Anime News Network opined that the series has a more serious tone and a better balance between comedy and drama than the first anime series; with more interesting digressions from the main plot. The pacing for the first episodes was criticised as slow, the delivery and development of the interactions between the characters received positive comments. Writing for the Los Angeles Times, Charles Solomon ranked Shippuden the third best anime on his "Top 10". In 2011, readers of Guinness World Records Gamer's Edition voted Naruto as the 29th-top video game character of all time.

=== Accolades ===
The Naruto anime was listed as the 38th best animated show in IGN's Top 100 Animated Series. In September 2005, Japanese television network TV Asahi broadcast a popularity poll based on a nationwide survey in which Naruto placed seventeenth. The first DVD compilation released by Viz received a nomination from the American Anime Awards for Best Package Design. At the Crunchyroll's inaugural Anime Awards in 2017, the fight between Naruto and Sasuke received a Most Popular "Other" mention in the Best Fight Scene category. At the 2nd edition in 2018, Naruto: Shippuden was nominated for Best Continuing Series.

The Naruto Shippuden BGM has won the International JASRAC Awards eight times: in 2013 and 2014, consecutively from 2020 to 2024, and again in 2026.

== Naruto run ==
The Naruto run

The Naruto run, or ninja run, is a running style based on the way the characters run in the anime, leaning forward with their arms outstretched behind their backs. It became popular in 2017 when groups worldwide organized events to run like Naruto characters, especially on anniversaries of the series. On June 27, 2019, Matty Roberts posted a satirical event called "Storm Area 51, They Can't Stop All of Us" on Facebook where he wrote "We will all meet up at the Area 51 Alien Center tourist attraction and coordinate our entry. If we naruto run, we can move faster than their bullets. Let's see them aliens." This quickly became an Internet meme, resulting in nationwide alerts and warnings issued by Nevada law enforcement and the U.S. Air Force to not go to Area 51.

== Notes ==
Language notes

General notes
