= Neil Kaplan =

American voice actor

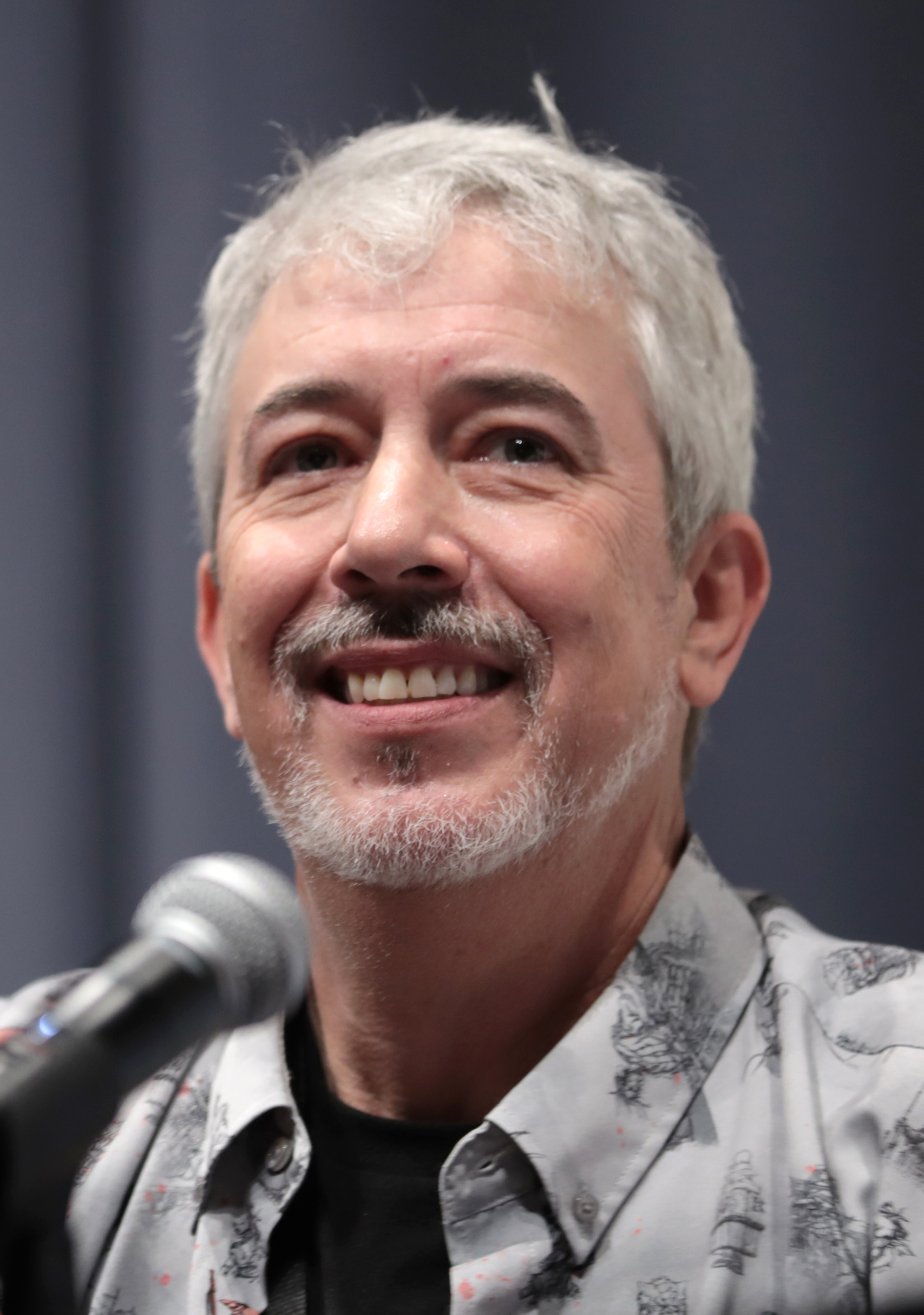
- Kaplan in 2023
- Born: Neil Charles Kaplan
- Other names: Neil Caplan; Bob Johnson
- Occupations: Voice actor; entertainer; comedian
- Years active: 1993–present
- Website: nekap.net

Neil Charles Kaplan is an American voice actor, audiobook narrator, entertainer, and comedian. His best-known voice roles are Hawkmon from Digimon, Genryūsai Shigekuni Yamamoto from Bleach, Emperor Zarkon from Voltron: Legendary Defender and Madara Uchiha from Naruto.

== Biography ==
Kaplan got his start as a comedian doing impressions of presidents such as Ronald Reagan and Richard Nixon. He also impersonated a little-known journalist at the time, Dan Rather. He then started work on video games, including several Star Wars titles. From there he went on to do such shows as Power Rangers, Digimon: Digital Monsters and Transformers: Robots in Disguise. He was once a contestant on the game show Street Smarts. On that appearance, he showed off some of his other impressions, including one of Gilbert Gottfried. He was a guest to the Power Morphicon (in Los Angeles) in June 2007 and August 2010, to Armageddon (in Australia and New Zealand) in October 2007, and to AVCon: Adelaide's Anime & Video Games Festival (in Australia) in July 2018. He also created the television series The Way it WASN'T! and the graphic novel I, of the Wolf. He voices Captain Fort Worth in the adult video game BoneCraft.

== Filmography ==
=== Anime ===
List of English dubbing performances in anime
Year	Title	Role	Notes	Source
1999	FAKE	Drake		
2000–01	Digimon Adventure 02	Halsemon, Hogan, Ilya, Hawkmon, Shurimon, Aquilamon, Silphymon (shared with Edie Mirman)		
2001–02	Digimon Tamers	Indramon, Divermon, Babel		
2001–02	Transformers: Robots in Disguise	Optimus Prime, Ro-Tor		
2002–03	Tokyo Pig	Principal		
2002–03	Digimon Frontier	Eldest Mushroomon, Woodmon (Ep. 4), Kokuwamon, Kokuwamon Elder (Ep. 5), Baromon (Ep. 40)		
2003	Reign: The Conqueror	Ibn	As Bob Johnson	
2003–04	Brigadoon: Marin & Melan	Shuta Alan, Poyon Silver, Detective Chunen	As Bob Johnson	
2005–06	Daphne in the Brilliant Blue	Lun Shibazaki, Additional Voices		
2006	Zatch Bell!	Belgim E.O.		
2007–14	Bleach	Genryūsai Shigekuni Yamamoto, Tetsuzaemon Iba, Ruzaburō "Enryū" Enkōgawa, Gesell, Tenken, Dordoni Alessandro Del Socaccio, Zommari Leroux (Ep. 195+)		
2008	Digimon Data Squad	Pumpkinmon #1 (Eps. 30–34), Ninjamon #3 (Ep. 31), Piximon (Ep. 32), Franz' Agent #1 (Ep. 33), Desk Man #1 (Ep. 33)		
2008	Naruto	Yōichi Kagetsu	Episode: "Laughing Shino"	
2008–10	Blue Dragon	Saber Tiger		
2011	Marvel Anime: Iron Man	Minister Defense Kuroda		
2012	Marvel Anime: Blade	High Council Chairman, Additional Voices		
2012–19	Naruto Shippuden	Tobi, Madara Uchiha		
2013–15	Digimon Fusion	Lord Bagra, NeoMyotismon, Anubismon		
2016	Sailor Moon	Edwards	Episode: "Usagi Dancing to the Waltz", Viz dub	
2017–18	Lupin the Third Part IV	Robson Zuccooli		
2018	Terraformars	Kaiki Kouno	Episode: "War - All-Out War"	
2019	Mobile Suit Gundam: The Origin	Dozle Zabi		
2020	Cagaster of an Insect Cage	Adham		
2020	Great Pretender	Lewis Mueller		
2021–22	Attack on Titan	Theo Magath		
2021–22	How a Realist Hero Rebuilt the Kingdom	Sebastian Silverdeer		
2022–present	Bleach: Thousand-Year Blood War	Genryūsai Shigekuni Yamamoto, Asuka Katakura, Tetsuzaemon Iba, Robert Accutrone, Dordoni Alessandro Del Socaccio		
2025–present	One Piece	Figarland Garling		

=== Animation ===
List of voice performances in animation
Year	Title	Role	Notes	Source
	The Mouse and the Monster	Utility Guy		
2006	Higglytown Heroes	Mover Hero		
2014	Robot Chicken	Albus Dumbledore, Lt. Stone		
2016–2018	Voltron: Legendary Defender	Emperor Zarkon		
2017	Penn Zero: Part-Time Hero	Club Owner		
2017	Wacky Races	Sheriff Longarm D. Law	Episode: "Smokey and the Racers"	
2019	Love, Death & Robots	Hank	Episode: "Suits"	
2021	Star Wars: Visions	Narrator	Episode" "The Ninth Jedi", English dub	

=== Films ===
- Digimon: The Movie – Twin Boy 1, Computer Voice 2, Professor, Hawkmon, Halsemon
- Digimon Adventure 02: The Beginning as Hawkmon
- Digimon Adventure: Our War Game! (standalone dub) - Professor, Little Boy 2C
- Digimon Adventure 02: Digimon Hurricane Touchdown!! / Transcendent Evolution! The Golden Digimentals (standalone dub) - Hawkmon, Halsemon
- Dragon Quest: Your Story – Dr. Agon, Zenith Dragon
- Ghost Cat Anzu – Old Man Mushroom
- Muhammad: The Last Prophet – 'Amr ibn al-'As, The Spy
- The Happy Cricket – Toad #1
- The Little Polar Bear – Bert
- Promare – Vulcan Haestus

=== Video games ===
- Baten Kaitos Origins – Wiseman/Verus Wiseman
- BioShock Infinite – Thursday Warren, John Hammond, Ezekiel Price
- BoneCraft – Captain Fort Worth
- Cartoon Network: Punch Time Explosion – Grim, Johnny Bravo, Him
- Conan – Bone Cleaver
- Conan Exiles - Nunu the Cannibal, Additional Voices
- Destiny 2 – Dominus Ghaul
- DreamWorks Voltron VR Chronicles – Emperor Zarkon
- Fallout 76 – Biv, Derrick Taylor, Dr. Emerson Hale, Hubert, Lev, Marcus, Intercom, Raiders, Blood Eagles
- Final Fantasy XIII – Cocoon Inhabitants
- Final Fantasy XIII-2 – Additional Voices
- Final Fantasy XV – Additional voices
- Gears of War 3 – Stranded Crew #7
- Guild Wars 2 – Various Charr and Norn NPCs, Edrick Thorn
- Hearthstone – Cenarius
- Heroes of the Storm – Tychus
- Honkai: Star Rail - Duke Inferno
- Infamous First Light – Additional Voices
- Justice League Heroes – Gorilla Grodd
- League of Legends – Aurelion Sol
- Lightning Returns: Final Fantasy XIII – Additional Voices
- Marvel Heroes – Sabretooth, Venom
- Mega Man Star Force Legacy Collection – Taurus Fire
- Middle-earth: Shadow of Mordor – Nemesis Orcs, Humans
- Naruto Shippuden: Ultimate Ninja Storm 3 – Obito Uchiha (Ninja War Tobi), Madara Uchiha
- Naruto Shippuden: Ultimate Ninja Storm 4 – Madara Uchiha, Obito Uchiha (Ninja War Tobi)
- Naruto Shippuden: Ultimate Ninja Storm Generations – Madara Uchiha
- Naruto Shippuden: Ultimate Ninja Storm Revolution – Madara Uchiha, Obito Uchiha (Ninja War Tobi)
- Ninja Gaiden II – Genshin
- Omega Strikers - Drek'ar
- Red Dead Redemption 2 – The Local Pedestrian Population
- Skylanders: Giants – Batterson, Hatterson
- Skylanders: Spyro's Adventure – Nort, Weapon Master
- Skylanders: Trap Team – Batterson, Hatterson
- Spider-Man 3 – Kraven the Hunter
- Spider-Man: Battle for New York – Norman Osborn / Green Goblin
- Spider-Man Unlimited - Daemos, Jennix
- Star Wars: The Old Republic – Skadge
- StarCraft II: Wings of Liberty – Tychus Findlay, Reaper, Vulture
- StarCraft II: Legacy of the Void - Herc
- Tell Me Why – Tom Vecchi / Alexander Kershwin
- The Last of Us – Additional Voices
- Transformers: Revenge of the Fallen – Long Haul
- Warhammer 40,000: Dawn of War II – Retribution – Ork Nob
- World of Warcraft: Cataclysm – Cenarius
- World of Warcraft: Warlords of Draenor – Additional Voices

=== Live-action ===
- Beetleborgs Metallix – Hornix, Witch Doctor (voices, credited as Bob Johnson)
- Big Bad Beetleborgs – Venus Claptrap (voice, credited as Bob Johnson)
- Mighty Morphin Power Rangers: The Movie – Oozemen (voice, uncredited)
- Power Rangers Lightspeed Rescue – Diabolico, Gold Beaked Monster (voices)
- Power Rangers Lost Galaxy – Destruxo (voice), Mutantrum (2nd voice)
- Power Rangers Time Force – Gluto (voice), Recap Narrator (voice, uncredited)

Preceded by Peter Cullen; 1984-1987; Original Series	Voice of Optimus Prime; 2001–2002; Robots in Disguise	Succeeded by Garry Chalk; 2002–2006; Unicron Trilogy
