= Obito Uchiha =

- Naruto character
- Obito, as drawn by Masashi Kishimoto
- First appearance: Naruto chapter 239: Chronicle 1: The Mission Begins...!! (2004)
- Created by: Masashi Kishimoto
- Voiced by: Japanese: Wataru Takagi; Naoya Uchida (Madara); Sosuke Komori (Kakashi Gaiden and 5 video games); Megumi Han (young) (Shippuden episode 343 and up); English: Michael Yurchak; Todd Haberkorn (Naruto Shippuden: Ultimate Ninja Storm Revolution); Neil Kaplan (Madara); Nolan North (Madara in Naruto Shippuden: Ultimate Ninja Storm 2); Vic Mignogna (young in all media and Madara in Naruto Shippuden: Ultimate Ninja Impact)

In-universe information
- Full name: Obito Uchiha
- Aliases: Tobi; Madara Uchiha

Obito Uchiha, also known by his alias Tobi (トビ), is a fictional character and one of the main antagonists in Masashi Kishimoto's manga (and anime adaptation) Naruto, being the primary instigator at fault for the tragic backstory of series protagonist Naruto Uzumaki, whose personality and motivations are nearly identical to those of Obito's younger self, making them foils.

He is first introduced in a "Kakashi Chronicle" side story, as a young ninja who sacrifices himself to save his friends (Kakashi Hatake and Rin Nohara) from a cave-in. Although he was believed to have died in the 3rd Great Ninja War, Obito is later revealed as a member of the organization known as the Akatsuki, mainly acting behind the scenes for a majority of the group's tenure. He uses the alias of Tobi and later that of his benefactor, Madara Uchiha, and conceals his true identity with masks. Obito seeks to harness the power of the Tailed Beasts in order to cast a genjutsu that will put all of humanity into an idealized dream state forever, having lost faith in the real world following Rin's death.

Kishimoto created Obito early in the series to explore his relationship with Kakashi and explain how his friend possessed the eye technique of Sharingan (写輪眼 寫輪眼; lit. 'Copy Wheel Eye"', English manga: "Mirror Wheel Eye"), unique to the Uchiha clan. Since Obito kept his identity secret, Kishimoto teased fans to anticipate the true identity of Tobi (most notably when the actual Madara Uchiha was revealed, which shocked fans and his voice actor). Critical reception of Obito's character has been praised, primarily for his tragic backstory and his fight scenes as an adult. In 2023, Obito was ranked as the 11th most popular character in the results of the Naruto Worldwide Character Popularity Vote. Obito and his varied personas have appeared in Naruto video games and some animated adaptations.

== Creation and design ==
A younger Obito

Obito's Mangekyō Sharingan

Although Obito does not appear for the first time until the series' special chapters focused on his life as a child soldier, he makes a cameo appearance on the cover of the manga's 16th chapter in a picture with Kakashi Hatake. According to Masashi Kishimoto, one of the biggest mysteries in the series' first half was why Kakashi only possessed one Sharingan eye technique (unlike Sasuke Uchiha and other members of the clan, who possessed the technique in both eyes). Kishimoto wrote Kakashi's backstory to show him as a young ninja whom Obito gave his Sharingan when he was nearly killed in a fight. Kishimoto said that by chapter 16 he had conceived a storyline about Obito being an Uchiha and how it would affect Kakashi.

During the series' first half, Kishimoto introduced the Akatsuki terrorist organization, which seemed far stronger than the (younger) main characters. This led Kishimoto to change the series, giving the story a timeskip to when Naruto and his comrades would be able to face them. Kishimoto said he based Akatsuki on similar real-life organizations. Obito in his Tobi persona was Kishimoto's favorite Akatsuki character to draw, because of his simple mask. His nickname (Tobi) comes from Obito calling him Guruguru (グルグル), an onomatopoeia for turning round and round or going around in circles. It can also mean "wrapped around", referring to Tobi's function as armor for Obito. With the manga reaching its climax, Kishimoto wanted to be careful with developing Obito's character, finding him as important as Naruto's and Sasuke's growth in the narrative.

According to Kishimoto, Konan's death at the hands of her former superior Obito's statement about the loss of the dream for peace that he, Nagato, Yahiko, and Konan shared, and an indication of Naruto Uzumaki's rise as a bringer of light and hope. When the real Madara Uchiha appeared in the manga, Kishimoto refrained from stating Tobi's true identity but said that both characters were related and he would be revealed in the next few chapters.

In the Japanese version, Obito is voiced by Wataru Takagi; his childhood self was voiced by Sōsuke Komori before Megumi Han took over in chapter 343. In the English version, Obito is voiced by Michael Yurchak and his younger self is voiced by Vic Mignogna. Nolan North does Obito's Madara impersonation in Naruto Shippuden: Ultimate Ninja Storm 2, and Todd Haberkorn voices him in Naruto Shippuden: Ultimate Ninja Storm Revolution. Neil Kaplan first voiced Obito's Madara impersonation in the video game Naruto Shippuden: Ultimate Ninja Storm 3, because the CyberConnect2 fighting game's storyline was ahead of the television series. In the game, it is revealed that Obito is not the real Madara. Kaplan had difficulty handling both characters: his Obito persona and the real Madara.

When Obito's true identity was revealed in the anime Naruto Shippuden, the Pierrot staff made an ending scene about his childhood and noted that the series' protagonist (Naruto) was not seen. Pierrot felt that the scene was a success. Character designer Tetsuya Nishio was surprised with the multiple designs Obito had across the series, and noted parallels between him and Naruto Uzumaki in their childhood and innocence.

== Appearances ==
=== In Naruto ===
Obito first appears in "Kakashi Chronicle", a Naruto side story. A child living through the Third Great Ninja War, Obito (Kakashi's teammate on Team Minato) wanted to become the Hokage of Konohagakure, and had an unrequited love for his teammate Rin. When he and Kakashi rescue the kidnapped Rin during a mission, Obito's right side is crushed by a boulder following a cave-in. Thinking he was going to die, Obito had Rin transplant his left Sharingan into Kakashi to replace Kakashi's lost left eye. Obito's death has a profound effect on Kakashi; he begins taking on his mannerisms such as showing up late to everything and adopts Obito's philosophy of how those who abandoned their comrades are "worse than scum". Late in Part II of the manga, it is revealed that Obito was saved by an elderly Madara Uchiha and outfitted with prosthetics. He becomes Madara's apprentice, and Madara has Obito witness Rin's death at the hands of a reluctant Kakashi to break his spirit. Concluding that he can use the power of the Tailed Beasts to destroy the current reality and create a utopia, Obito adopts Madara's name and disguises his voice after the ninja's death; he then arranges similar events for Nagato with Yahiko's death to create the current incarnation of the Akatsuki. While Kushina Uzumaki (then jinchuriki of Kurama, the Nine-Tails Kyuubi), is giving birth to Naruto Uzumaki, Obito mounts an attack on the Leaf Village, Konoha. He releases the seal over the Kyuubi from Kushina while she is weak during birth, and places the Nine-Tails under his control, releasing it on Konoha to tear the village apart and wreak havoc. During his infiltration, he encounters his former mentor Minato Namikaze (the fourth Hokage) and they fight. Minato defeats Obito, and releases Kurama from Obito's control. Obito then flees, leaving Konoha to deal with the Nine-Tails, resulting in Minato and Kushina's deaths. The character has a behind-the-scenes role in the first half of Part II.

Adopting the identity of the spiral-patterned Zetsu which served as his bodysuit during his recuperation, Tobi, Obito poses as the carefree flunky and becomes Sasori's replacement and Deidara's partner early in Part II. After Itachi's death, Obito takes a special interest in Sasuke Uchiha and takes him under his wing by revealing the truth about their clan's massacre. He presents himself as Madara after Nagato's death, revealing the "Eye of the Moon" Plan to the Kage and explaining his intention to become the Ten-Tails Jinchuriki to bring all life within an Infinite Tsukuyomi. After the Kage refuses to surrender to him, Obito declares the Fourth Great Ninja War and forms a reluctant alliance with Kabuto Yakushi, who blackmails him with the real Madara's body. Obito goes to retrieve Nagato Uzumaki's Rinnegan (輪廻眼; lit. 'Saṃsāra Eye') from his body. In the process, he is opposed by Konan. Their argument, in which Konan affirms her faith in Naruto, and Obito (still impersonating Madara) claims his original ownership of the Rinnegan, quickly evolves into a fight. Konan attempts to catch him in various large-scale paper bomb detonations, but he manages to trick her with the Izanagi technique, and stabs her in the back; he obtains the location of Nagato's body through genjutsu, and proceeds to choke her to death. He retrieves Nagato's body and Rinnegan successfully.

Obito converts the reanimated bodies of the captured Jinchuriki into his own "Six Paths of Pain" (ペイン六道, Pein Rikudō) to use the captured Tailed Beasts' power. He fights Naruto Uzumaki and Killer B, who stop the Six Paths of Pain and leave Obito to recover the Tailed Beasts and revive the Ten-Tails. After Kabuto reanimates Madara Uchiha's body to aid in the war; Obito's identity is revealed as his mask his shattered during a fight with Naruto, Killer B, Might Guy, and Kakashi. As the rest of the allied shinobi forces arrive to battle him and Madara, Obito uses the Ten-Tails to bring despair and challenges Naruto's will, attempting to defy his past self as Naruto reminds him of himself when he was younger.

After directing Kakashi to impale him, destroying the seal in his heart, Obito becomes the Ten-Tails host but is defeated by Naruto and Sasuke with the support of the Allied Shinobi Forces. As the Ten-Tails is extracted from him, Naruto appears in his subconscious and convinces him to return to their side. A guilt-ridden Obito tries to revive everyone who died in the war, like Nagato before him, only to be possessed by Black Zetsu and forced to resurrect Madara. On the brink of death, Obito turns on Madara, restrains Black Zetsu and moves to save Naruto's life. His defiance is short-lived, and he is left comatose after Madara forcefully reclaims his Rinnegan. Naruto uses his power to restore Obito's life to help fight Kaguya. Obito dies while shielding Naruto and Kakashi from Kaguya's attack; however, he thanks Naruto for reminding him of his true self. His spirit remains among the living long enough to help Kakashi by momentarily giving him his chakra and Mangekyo Sharingan (万華鏡写輪眼, Mangekyō Sharingan; lit. 'Kaleidoscope Copy Wheel Eye'), passing into the next life after Kaguya is defeated.

=== In other media ===
In addition to the main series, Obito appears in a number of video games. The game Naruto Shippuden: Ultimate Ninja Storm Revolution describes the origin of the Akatsuki organization. The sixth Part II film, Road to Ninja: Naruto the Movie (2012), features Obito in his Madara persona. He traps Naruto and Sakura in an alternate world and manipulates Naruto's opposite persona, Menma. When Naruto defeats Menma, Obito releases Naruto and Sakura and considers the mission a failure. He appears in the Naruto light novel Naruto Jinraiden: The Day the Wolf Howled (2012), which explores Sasuke's reflections after Itachi's death. In Akatsuki Hiden (2015), Obito's first meeting with Nagato is shown.

== Reception ==
The exploration of Obito's childhood in the Naruto Shippuden anime series was well received. Sci Fi Online enjoyed the handling of his, Rin and Kakashi's past, which had a major impact on the series' main storyline. IGN ranked Obito and Konan's fight the 11th-best battle in Naruto, and ranked Obito's fight against Minato Namikaze the fourth-best in the series. CyberConnect2 CEO Hiroshi Matsuyama said Obito became his favorite character in the Naruto series; Matsuyama's previous favorites were Shikamaru Nara and Itachi Uchiha. In a manga popularity poll, Obito was voted the 19th-most-popular Naruto character. Takagi's portrayal of the character in the final war was the subject of praise within viewers of the series due to how dark he is in contrast to his younger persona.

Regarding the character, before his identity reveals, Jason Thompson of Anime News Network was shocked to learn that Tobi was the real leader of Akatsuki (instead of Pain), and when Tobi refers to himself as Madara Uchiha. Thompson enjoyed Kishimoto's depiction of Tobi's teleportation technique and was surprised when Tobi told Sasuke Uchiha the truth about Itachi. He later called Tobi an "insane idealist" (similar to Nagato) after learning of his desire to create a peaceful world with the powerful Ten-Tails. A UK Anime Network reviewer enjoyed Obito's action scenes with Naruto, Killer Bee, Kakashi, and Guy because of his ability to reanimate the six-tailed beasts.

Bryce Coulter of the Fandom Post enjoyed the revelation of Tobi's true identity and liked its impact on Kakashi, praising the story's treatment of his inner turmoil, as he "confronts the demons of his past". UK Anime Network found Tobi's true identity predictable, but highly enjoyed the backstory reveal, calling it "probably the most interesting flashback sequence of the series to date". Jason Thompson was shocked at the revelation that Tobi was Obito, finding the "most compassionate person in the manga" holding a grudge against the world to be out of character. Amy McNulty of Anime News Network praised the animation of Kakashi's fight against Obito and the references to the fighters' childhoods. McNulty found the character's death predictable, and criticized the development of Obito briefly giving Kakashi his eyes' techniques after dying, finding it counter to the prevailing theme of "hard work". Chris Beveridge had mixed feelings about the treatment of Obito's death in the anime version; the narrative begins focusing on flashbacks and his childhood dreams (which had already been shown), neglecting the present fight against Kaguya.
