= Madaras (disambiguation) =

Madaras is a village in Bács-Kiskun county, Hungary.

Madaras may also refer to:

- Madaras (surname)
- Sherkat-e Madaras, a village in Kenarshahr Rural District, Iran

== See also ==
- Mădăraș (disambiguation)
- Madara (disambiguation)
