= Mădăraș =

Mădăraș or Mădăras may refer to:

- Mădăras, a commune in Bihor County, Romania
- Mădăraș, Harghita, a commune in Harghita County, Romania
- Mădăraș, Mureș, a commune in Mureș County, Romania
- Mădăras, a village in Ardud town, Satu Mare County, Romania
- Mădăraș River, a tributary of the Olt River in Romania

== See also ==
- Madaras (disambiguation)
- Madara (disambiguation)
