= Nagato (Naruto) =

Fictional character from Naruto

Nagato Uzumaki
- Naruto character
- Nagato as drawn by Masashi Kishimoto
- First appearance: Naruto chapter 372: The Weeping Land!! (2007)
- Created by: Masashi Kishimoto
- Voiced by: Japanese: Junpei Morita; Ken'yu Horiuchi (Pain); Tomoaki Maeno (child); Shiho Hisajima (female animal path); English: Vic Mignogna; Troy Baker (Pain); Matthew Mercer (Pain episode 376 or 454 and up, Naruto Shippuden: Ultimate Ninja Storm 4, and Rock Lee & His Ninja Pals); Dave Wittenberg (Pain in episode 135); Kari Wahlgren (female animal path in Naruto Shippuden: Ultimate Ninja Storm 2); Stephanie Sheh (female animal path in Naruto: Shippuden)

In-universe information
- Full name: Nagato Uzumaki
- Alias: Pain
- Title: Leader of The Akatsuki

Nagato Uzumaki (Japanese: 渦巻長門), known primarily under the alias of Pain (Japanese: ペイン, Hepburn: Pein), is a fictional character in the manga and anime series Naruto created by Masashi Kishimoto, and is a major antagonist in the series.

Nagato Uzumaki is the public figurehead leader of the Akatsuki who wishes to capture all the tailed beasts sealed into various people around the shinobi world. After acquiring and sealing most of the beasts within the Gedo statue, Nagato's advisor, Obito Uchiha who controlled the Akatsuki in reality, advises him to capture the Nine-Tailed Demon Fox named Kurama that was sealed inside the series' main protagonist, Naruto Uzumaki. Before leaving to capture Naruto, Nagato engages in a mortal battle with his former mentor, Jiraiya. His past as a war orphan, and his loss of his best friend Yahiko are explored. Due to his traumatic experiences, which stemmed from human conflict, Nagato aims to create a new world, free from the chaos of war. Nagato also appears in the series' video games.

Nagato was conceived by Kishimoto as a villain, a victim of war, who would show Naruto the impact and gravity of world wars, something Kishimoto aimed to explore throughout the series. While Nagato does not fight in the story, he uses a group of corpses known as "The Six Paths of Pain" (ペイン六道, Pein Rikudō). All of them were given elaborate designs with multiple piercings across their bodies to reinforce the idea that despite his calm demeanor, Nagato is a dangerous person.

Critical response to Nagato's character has been generally positive, praising the chaos he brings to the story, including the murder of Jiraiya and the destruction of the Hidden Leaf itself while chasing Naruto. His eventual fight against Naruto has been regarded as one of the best battles in the entire series.

== Creation and design ==
The Six Paths of Pain as seen in the manga of Naruto

Nagato originated from Masashi Kishimoto's desire to elaborate on the ending to the manga series Naruto. While the series was known for its fight scenes and tragedies, the main characters never experienced a war. Once the series began its "second part", simply referred to as Part II in the manga and Shippuden in the anime, Kishimoto felt the need to create a story arc that would emphasize the tragedy of wars, leading to the final arc which would include a war. The principal reason for this was a significant difference between the two main characters, Naruto Uzumaki who had no knowledge of wars, and Sasuke Uchiha who was a victim of one; his entire clan had been annihilated to avoid a potential civil war. As a result, Kishimoto created Nagato as a war victim who would kill Naruto's teacher, Jiraiya, and act as Naruto's arch nemesis so he would understand the tragedy that Sasuke had experienced. This led to the creation of the series' final arc, the Fourth Great Shinobi War, where Naruto engages in a bigger fight with the remaining members of the terrorist organization Akatsuki.

According to Kishimoto, Pain's story arc was the most difficult one to write. He felt this because the protagonist, Naruto, truly forgave his enemy. Instead of having the protagonist kill the enemy he hates as happens in other series, Kishimoto found the idea of the two characters interacting and settling their differences more challenging. This had a major impact on the writer, and he decided to have Naruto forgive Sasuke during their final fight in a similar manner as he interacted with Nagato. Retrospectively, Kishimoto believes Naruto took a darker tone with Nagato's introduction due to how his life indicated serious themes rarely present in shonen manga and thus often questioned himself what type of conclusion to this fight between the Akatsuki and the main character.

Regarding the bonds in the story, Kishimoto highlighted the importance of Jiraiya's death during his fight against Pain; this remark was made since, in his last moments, Jiraiya managed to discover the origin of Pain's multiple bodies and used his remaining forces to send a message to Naruto in which he explained how Pain can be defeated. As Nagato was Akatsuki's leader, Kishimoto aimed to give him a striking design showing an appealing look while simultaneously depicting him as a dangerous person. Since his alias is "Pain", he decided to add some piercings to his body—a metaphor for how he inflicts "pain upon himself". Notable among the few unused concept designs for him is a small sketch where Pain appears to wear a partial mask with a feather or horn-like accessories fitted to his forehead protector.

In the Japanese anime, Nagato's voice actor is Junpei Morita, while Yahiko/Deva(Literally meaning "God" in Hindi)/Tendo Path is voiced by Kenyu Horiuchi; in the English dub, Nagato is voiced by Vic Mignogna, and Yahiko/Deva Path is voiced by Troy Baker (except for Ultimate Ninja Storm 4, where he is voiced by Matthew Mercer). While the other Paths shared the Deva Path's voice actors, the second Animal Path is voiced by Shiho Hisajima in Japanese and Stephanie Sheh in English. In regard to Nagato, Mignogna said "his story arc is amazing".

== Appearances ==
Nagato is the recognized leader of the Akatsuki and Konan's partner, with Obito Uchiha acting as his benefactor. The "Pain" that is most often seen and used in the series is the Deva Path. This is actually Nagato's deceased friend Yahiko (弥彦), one of six animated corpses collectively known as "The Six Paths of Pain" that are controlled by Nagato and use one sixth of his full power. The Pain Paths are all outfitted with a number of body piercings that serve as a means for Nagato to control them and offer them a "more dangerous" appearance in relation to their name's installation. Through Nagato's Rinnegan (輪廻眼; lit. 'Saṃsāra Eye'), they can share visual information and coordinate attacks.

Orphaned from the war-torn country of Amegakure, the Village Hidden in Rain, Nagato meets fellow orphans that he would become very close to named Konan and Yahiko, before they are all trained by Jiraiya. A descendant of the Uzumaki clan like Naruto, Nagato's Rinnegan is later revealed to have belonged to Madara Uchiha, who transplanted his eyes into the child as part of his plan. Nagato desires peace for the world, helping Yahiko to create the Akatsuki to achieve that shared dream. The anime reveals Nagato is observed from afar by Madara's apprentice Tobi, who assumes Madara's identity. Following Yahiko's death, which Tobi orchestrated, by the actions of Hanzo of the Salamander, who was the Hidden Rain village leader, and Danzo Shimura of the Hidden Leaf Village, Nagato rethinks the idea that peace can only be attained by teaching the world suffering caused by war. For this, Nagato adopts the name of "Pain" and kills Hanzo, taking over as the new leader of the Hidden Rain and becoming a "god" for its citizens. Crippled from both Hanzo's attack and his link with the Gedo Statue, Nagato finds a way to overcome his weakness by remotely controlling the corpses of deceased people as if they were their own. Besides Yahiko, Nagato creates the other Paths from the corpses of five ninja that Jiraiya encountered in the past. After this, unaware that Tobi is manipulating him, Pain begins leading the Akatsuki to force the world into peace using any means necessary.

Pain is confronted by his former mentor Jiraiya while infiltrating the Hidden Rain, resulting in a fight that ends with his mentor's death and the loss of his Animal Path vessel. Nagato converts the corpse of a Rain kunoichi named Ajisai (アジサイ, Ajisai) into a new Animal Path before beginning his attack on the Hidden Leaf. The rest of the Paths are destroyed in the fight against Naruto, with the Deva Path disabled, and Nagato recovers his faith in Jiraiya and world peace while talking with Naruto. He then sacrifices his life to revive the people he killed in the Hidden Leaf. Konan takes Nagato's and Yahiko's bodies to be placed in a tomb. Tobi desecrates Nagato's resting place to acquire the Rinnegan, which Madara later reclaims once fully resurrected. Nagato is reanimated by Tobi's ally Kabuto Yakushi during the war and sent alongside former ally Itachi Uchiha to battle Naruto and Killer Bee. Though he regains some of his ability to fight again, Nagato gets sealed by the combined efforts of Itachi, Killer Bee and Naruto and is sent back to the afterlife.

Besides the main series, Nagato appears in multiple video games based on the series. The game Naruto Shippuden: Ultimate Ninja Storm Revolution shows the organization of the Akatsuki group. Nagato's actions are also present in the light novel Akatsuki Hiden: Evil Flowers in Full Bloom as a story Sasuke Uchiha learns while wandering across the world.

== Reception ==
Nagato has been a popular character from the Naruto series. IGN listed him as the fourth best character in the story. The site called him "one of the most philosophically and psychologically complex characters" due to the depth he brought to the series and the impact he had on the story, not only for his crimes but for the way he tried to redeem himself in his final moments interacting with Naruto. IGN felt Nagato's battle with Jiraiya was the franchise's second best fight, adding it might be one of the best animated fights in anime history. On the other hand, Anime News Network criticized the story of Nagato and Jiraiya, feeling that Sasuke Uchiha's conflict with the Akatsuki was far more entertaining; nevertheless, the fact that Nagato killed his former teacher was said to have a major impact on the series. In a manga popularity poll, Nagato was voted the 23rd most popular Naruto character.

Critical response to Nagato's role in the series has been positive. Anime UK News praised his invasion of Konohagakure, mainly due to the chaos he created during the fights, offering the audience a sensation of hopelessness as multiple characters were defeated and killed, yet still providing hope that Naruto would be able to defeat Nagato due to his constant training. The reviewer also felt the appearance of Konohamaru Sarutobi, a younger ninja friend of Naruto, to defeat one of the six Pains was appealing but said the anime's production did not live up to the original manga. Anime News Network said the major destruction Nagato brought to the village had a great impact, most notably when the area became empty because of one of his techniques. His eventual fight against Naruto has been praised for the fact that both fighters used interesting tactics during the battle, with Mania Entertainment sensing a major change in Naruto as he was haunted by the idea of avenging Jiraiya. The Fandom Post wrote that Nagato impacted both the story and Naruto when he nearly killed Hinata Hyuga once Naruto was overwhelmed by him. The new motivation Naruto had for defeating the Akatsuki was praised despite the mixed responses to the way he defeated Nagato in the next episodes. UK Anime Network also praised Nagato's actions during the invasion and the fights for all the damage he caused to the village. The reviewer recommended these scenes to newcomers because of how interesting the story had become and felt this arc was the best part of the series for fans. However, the reviewer strongly criticized the animation Studio Pierrot produced for an episode where the struggle between Nagato and Naruto continued. In contrast to UK Anime Network, another reviewer for The Fandom Post thought the anime adaptation managed to make the fight between Nagato and Naruto entertaining in terms of movements, audio and voice acting. They felt Nagato's words regarding his philosophy of war had a big impact on Naruto, who said he cannot fight back. Anime News Network felt that the entire battle managed to be one of the best in the series because of the tactics used by the two characters, and had a notable emotional impact on viewers.

Following the battle that ended when Naruto defeated all six Pains after which Nagato interacted with him. Nagato's past was viewed as too tragic by Anime News Network, citing the death of his parents among other desperate scenes that led the reviewer to feel it was too dark for a series aimed at a young demographic. The Fandom Post felt that Naruto's intention to follow Jiraiya's wish for world peace against Nagato's philosophy of a world of chaos had a major impact on the story. The way Naruto presented his ideals to Nagato brought further depth to the series. However, Nagato's final actions, including killing himself to revive some of the people he murdered, got a mixed responses from Anime News Network because it reduced the tension and drama he had built in the story.

== See also ==
- List of Naruto Characters
