= Mudar (name) =

Mudar is as masculine given name of Arabic origin. Notable people with the name include:

== Given name ==
- Mudar Badran (1934–2023), Jordanian politician
- Mudar ibn Nizar, ancestor of the Mudar
- Mudar Zahran (born 1973), Jordanian Palestinian writer

== Surname/family name ==
- Rabiah ibn Mudhar, Lakhmid king of Himayar

== See also ==
- Mudar (disambiguation)
