= Mudar (disambiguation) =

Mudar is a northern Arab tribal grouping.

Mudar may also refer to:

== People ==
- Mudar (name), list of people with the name

== Other uses ==
- Mudhar Club (handball), a handball club
- Diyar Mudar, medieval Arabic name of the westernmost of the three provinces of al-Jazira
- Mudar language

== See also ==
- Madar (disambiguation)
