= Madara =

Madara may refer to:

- Madara (manga), a 1987 Japanese media franchise
- Madara (village), in Bulgaria
- Mädara, village in Põhja-Pärnumaa Parish, Pärnu County, Estonia
- Madara (EP), EP by The Gazette
- Madara (music video), video album by The Gazette
- Madara Uchiha, a character in the manga/anime series Naruto
- Madara, also called Nyanko-sensei, a character in the manga/anime series Natsume's Book of Friends
- "Madara", a 2026 song by Filipino rapper Ez Mil featuring American rapper Eminem, Japanese rapper Hideyoshi, and American voice actor Neil Kaplan

== People ==
- John Madara, songwriter and record producer
- Madara Chennaiah, a 12th-century Kannada vachana poet and saint who was a cobbler by profession.
- Madara Līduma (born 1982), World Cup level Latvian biathlete
- Madara Mālmane (born 1989), Latvian model
- Madara Palameika (born 1987), Latvian javelin thrower
- Madara Pavlova (born 2008), Latvian luger

== See also ==
- Madar (disambiguation)
- Madaras (disambiguation)
- Madara Rider, an early medieval large rock relief and UNESCO World Heritage site in northeastern Bulgaria
- Madara Peak, a 430m peak in Vidin Heights, Livingston Island
- Madara Cosmetics, a Latvian manufacturer of organic skin care products
