= Madar =

Madar may refer to:

Places

- Madar Junction, train station in Ajmer, Rajasthan, India
- Madar, Nepal
- Madar, Yemen
- Madar, Hungarian name for Modrany, village in southern Slovakia

Entertainment

- Madar (album) an album by Norwegian saxophonist Jan Garbarek and Tunisian oud player Anouar Brahem
- Mother (1951 film), a 1951 Iranian film
- Mother (1991 film), Iranian film by Ali Hatami

Others

- Madar tree, Erythrina variegata
- Madar (surname)
- Badiuddin Shah Madar, Muslim Sufi saint who founded the Madariyya sect of Sufism in India

== See also ==
- Madara (disambiguation)
- Mudar (disambiguation)
- Madari, a caste of Indian Muslims, followers of the Madariyya sect
