= Madaras (surname) =

Madaras is a Hungarian surname. Notable people with the surname include:

- Ádám Madaras (born 1966), Hungarian pentathlete, fencer, actor, stuntman and media entrepreneur
- Gergely Madaras (born 1984), Hungarian conductor
- Gyula Madarász (1858–1931), Hungarian ornithologist and nature artist
- József Madaras (1937–2007), Hungarian actor
- Lynda Madaras (late 20th c.), American educator and writer
- Norbert Madaras (born 1979), Hungarian water polo player
- Oksana Madaras (born 1969), Ukrainian conductor
