= Naruto Shippuden: Ultimate Ninja Storm Revolution =

2014 video game

- Provisional European cover art; in the North American release, Obito Uchiha was shown unmasked beside Madara Uchiha. Also, characters Konohamaru Sarutobi, Kushina Uzumaki, and Iruka Umino were also shown in the North American release.
- Developer: CyberConnect2
- Publisher: Bandai Namco Games
- Directors: Takahiro Yano; Yohei Ishibashi
- Producer: Yuuki Nishikawa
- Designers: Yutaka Senkoshi; Hiroshi Aoki; Ryuji Tominaga; Shinsaku Sawamura; Daniel Hedjazi; Daiki Kato; Mayu Shibata
- Programmers: Yasuhiko Tsuneoka; Mirai Satake; Kazuma Fuchimoto; Yuta Mitsushio; Kohei Fukuda
- Writer: Shigeaki Fujino
- Composer: Chikayo Fukuda
- Series: Naruto: Ultimate Ninja
- Platforms: PlayStation 3, Xbox 360, Microsoft Windows
- Release: September 11, 2014 PlayStation 3, Xbox 360: JP: September 11, 2014; NA: September 12, 2014; EU: September 16, 2014; Microsoft Windows: WW: September 15, 2014
- Genre: Fighting
- Modes: Single-player, multiplayer

Naruto Shippuden: Ultimate Ninja Storm Revolution, known in Japan as Naruto Shippūden: Narutimate Storm Revolution (NARUTO(ナルト) 疾風伝 ナルティメットストーム レボリューション), is a fighting video game developed by CyberConnect2 and published by Bandai Namco Games as part of the Naruto: Ultimate Ninja video game series, based on the manga Naruto by Masashi Kishimoto. The game was released in September 2014 in Japan, North America, and Europe for the PlayStation 3 and Xbox 360. This is the last Naruto video game released for PlayStation 3 and Xbox 360.

The game features a revamped fighting system. It includes new ways of forming teams based on their skills as well as counterattacks and guard breaks. Masashi Kishimoto worked in the game by providing the new character Mecha-Naruto as well as new designs for the characters belonging to the organization Akatsuki whose back-stories are being told in this game. The game also includes a tournament mode where the player can battle against three CPU fighters at the same time, in an all-out battle royale format. Players are also able to customize characters.

== Gameplay ==
The game introduced guard-break and counterattack and 100 characters and 14 only support characters. In the former, the player breaks the guard of the opponent, knocking him or her unconscious. This gives the player the opportunity to unleash a deadly attack to inflict serious damage. There is a limit, however, on the number of times it can be used. In regards to a counterattack, if an opponent is about to land an attack on the player, the players can knock them unconscious, rendering them helpless and sealing their support. Timing is the key here and a counterattack is a chakra-consuming action. The game also features a revamped support system. There are largely three types of teams. The Drive type locks the battle with a Sealed Barrier that always activates the Support Drive ability. Support Drives call in other team members to chain attacks with the player's main character or block for him depending on the type of support the three man cell provides. Ultimate Jutsu type is a team that can do a heavy damage super attack, which depends on the team the player use. Awakening team types can use an awakening at the start of the battle by using the right analog stick.

The game has 118 playable characters, with new characters being added in addition to returning ones. Series creator Masashi Kishimoto was involved in the game to design an original character: a robot version of Naruto Uzumaki named Mecha-Naruto who has a two-stage awakening: a four-tails transformation and a Mecha-Kurama transformation. Playing a role in the newly introduced four-player Tournament Mode, Mecha-Naruto appears in a two-part episode of the Naruto Shippuden series that aired on the day of the game's release in Japan. In addition to the new character, Kishimoto also designed new costumes for Sasori, Deidara, Hidan, Kakuzu, and Orochimaru, as well as the design for a technique used by one of the game's new characters, Shisui Uchiha.

In addition to following the series canon until the latest animated episode, the game features new side stories. These include stories about Akatsuki, Shisui Uchiha and Kushina Uzumaki. After working to create new animations for Naruto Shippuden: Ultimate Ninja Storm Generations, the developer of Naruto anime series, Studio Pierrot was once again involved to animate 50 minutes' worth of animation for the new side stories.

== Plot ==
The first of three original animated stories, "Creation of the Akatsuki", reveals the origins of the new group's membership. After the events that lead to Yahiko's death, Obito appears in his Tobi guise before Nagato and Konan after the former killed Hanzo of the Salamander and gain control of the Hidden Rain Village. Obito tells them to rebuild the Akatsuki's ranks with a membership of ten as he instructs Nagato and Zetsu to recruit Kakuzu while Konan drafts Sasori. At that time, Obito personally recruits Itachi Uchiha and then Kisame Hoshigake. Later, Orochimaru manages to attract the Akatsuki's attention to join their ranks for his own purposes. After the recruitment of Deidara by Itachi and Hidan by Kakuzu and Orochimaru, the Akatsuki's ranks are complete as they begin their mission to find and capture the tailed Beasts. The second story tells of Shisui Uchiha at the time of his death. It begins with Shisui and Itachi fighting which Shisui wins. They later start talking about the Uchiha's coup, while the third, "The Far Reaches of Hope", depicts Kushina Uzumaki interacting with a young Obito and the rest of Team Minato.

== Development and release ==
For this game, the development team requested help from an expert at fighting games to create a new battle system. For this they wanted to have more movements that required more inputs. Because there are more than one hundred characters, there was a lot of testing and adjustment to find the best result in making the game. The team decided to focus on the fighting system over the hack and slash segments introduced in previous games. Ideas for Mecha-Naruto started when the staff had discussion about including a new mode. Masashi Kishimoto was the man responsible for Mecha-Naruto upon being suggested by the staff to include a new character. Kishimoto decided on adding a character that would bring a big impact to worldwide level which resulted in Mecha-Naruto. CyberConnect2 CEO Hiroshi Matsuyama was surprised when seeing the new character.

Kishimoto had also previously showed the staff designs he created for some Akatsuki members which led to the staff to see it as a perfect opportunity to use them in the game. It was then when they contacted Studio Pierrot, in charge of the series' animated version and proposed to them the possibility of showing a new story involving these Akatsuki members that would please fans from the series. As Matsuyama exclaims, this story was original and said to take place years before the organization was introduced and not will be considered as manga canon. Although the game is a spin-off from the previous Storm game, the characters and story have been supervised by Kishimoto. Matsuyama commented the new scenario's final might be tearjerker for some players.

The game was released in Japan, North America, and Europe in September 2014. In Europe, the game was shipped in two special editions alongside the standard version. The "Rivals" day one edition includes two exclusive costumes which will not be sold separately at a later date. Naruto is dressed as Sasuke Uchiha, while Sasuke is dressed as Naruto. The "Samurai Edition" includes a 17 cm Naruto Samurai Figurine (produced exclusively for the game) and a metal case. The game will also include the original video animation Naruto Shippūden Sunny Side Battle!!!. Matsuyama expects the game to sell over 1.5 million copies worldwide.

== Reception ==
Reception

Aggregate score
Aggregator	Score
Metacritic	(PC) 61/100 (PS3) 73/100 (X360) 62/100

Review scores
Publication	Score
Famitsu	35/40
GameRevolution	3/5
Push Square	8/10
Hardcore Gamer	3.5/5

The game has received positive critical reception in Japan, with Famitsu giving a score of 35 out of 40 in both PlayStation 3 and Xbox 360 versions. In western market, the game received mixed to positive reviews from critics. Review aggregator website Metacritic gave the PlayStation 3 version 73/100.
