= Naruto =

Japanese manga series by Masashi Kishimoto

- First tankōbon volume cover, featuring Naruto Uzumaki

NARUTO -ナルト-
- Genre: Adventure; Fantasy comedy; Martial arts
- Manga
- Written by: Masashi Kishimoto
- Published by: Shueisha
- English publisher: AUS: Madman Entertainment; NA/UK: Viz Media
- Imprint: Jump Comics
- Magazine: Weekly Shōnen Jump
- English magazine: NA: Weekly Shonen Jump; Shonen Jump
- Original run: September 21, 1999 – November 10, 2014
- Volumes: 72
- Anime television series
- Naruto (2002–07); Naruto: Shippuden (2007–17)
- Media franchise
- List of Naruto media; List of Naruto films; List of Naruto video games; Boruto
- icon

Naruto (Note: Japanese: NARUTO -ナルト-) is a Japanese manga series written and illustrated by Masashi Kishimoto. It tells the story of Naruto Uzumaki, a young, socially isolated ninja who seeks recognition from his peers and dreams of becoming the Hokage, the leader of his village. The story is told in two parts: the first is set in Naruto's pre-teen years (volumes 1–27), and the second in his teens (volumes 28–72). The series is based on two one-shot manga by Kishimoto: Karakuri (1995), which earned Kishimoto an honorable mention in Shueisha's monthly Hop Step Award the following year, and Naruto (1997).

Naruto was serialized in Shueisha's shōnen manga magazine Weekly Shōnen Jump from September 1999 to November 2014, with its 700 chapters collected in 72 tankōbon volumes. Viz Media licensed the manga for North American production and serialized Naruto in their digital Weekly Shonen Jump magazine. The manga was adapted into two anime television series by Pierrot and Aniplex, which ran from October 2002 to March 2017 on TV Tokyo. Pierrot also produced 11 animated films and 12 original video animations (OVAs). The franchise additionally includes light novels, video games, and trading cards. The story continues in Boruto, where Naruto's son Boruto Uzumaki creates his own ninja path as opposed to following his father's.

Naruto is one of the best-selling manga series of all time, having sold over 250 million copies in 46 countries. It has become one of Viz Media's best-selling manga series; their English translations of the volumes have appeared on USA Today and The New York Times's bestseller list several times, and the seventh volume won a Quill Award in 2006. Naruto has been praised for its character development, storylines, and action sequences, though some felt the latter slowed the story down. Critics noted that the manga, which contains coming-of-age themes, often incorporates cultural references to Japanese mythology and Confucianism.

== Plot ==
=== Part I ===
A demonic nine-tailed fox called Kurama attacks Konoha, the Village Hidden in the Leaves in the Land of Fire, one of the Five Great Shinobi Countries in the Ninja World. In response, the leader of the Leaf, Fourth Hokage Minato Namikaze, sacrifices his life by splitting the fox in half and sealing the fox inside himself and in the body of his newborn son, Naruto Uzumaki, respectively, making him a host of the beast. (Note: The host is known as a jinchuriki in the story. The secret that the fourth Hokage who sealed the beast in Naruto is his father is revealed in Part II. It is a human being in the Ninja World who has a Tailed Beast inside of them. A Tailed Beast is a giant creature that contains a large amount of chakra (energy) inside of their bodies.) The Third Hokage, Hiruzen Sarutobi, returns from retirement to become the leader of the Leaf again. Naruto is often scorned by Konoha's villagers for being the host of the Nine-Tails. Due to a decree by the Third Hokage forbidding any mention of these events, Naruto learns nothing about the Nine-Tails until 12 years later, when Mizuki, a renegade ninja, reveals the truth to him. Naruto defeats Mizuki in combat, earning the respect of his teacher, Iruka Umino. (Note: In Naruto, a jutsu is a skill or a technique involving supernatural abilities.)

Shortly afterward, Naruto becomes a ninja and joins with Sasuke Uchiha and Sakura Haruno to form Team 7, under an experienced sensei, the elite ninja Kakashi Hatake. Like all the ninja teams from every village, Team 7 completes missions requested by the villagers, ranging from doing chores and being bodyguards.

After several missions, including a major one in the Land of Waves, Kakashi allows Team 7 to take what is known as the Chunin Exams, enabling ninja to advance to a higher rank and take on more difficult missions. During the exams, Orochimaru, a wanted criminal, invades Konoha. The Third Hokage subsequently sacrifices his life to disable Orochimaru from permanently performing jutsus using his hands. Jiraiya, one of the three legendary Sannin, declines the title of Fifth Hokage and searches with Naruto for Tsunade, another Sannin, whom he chooses to become Fifth Hokage instead.

During the search it is revealed that Orochimaru wishes to train Sasuke because of his powerful genetic heritage, the Sharingan. (Note: The Sharingan (写輪眼; lit. 'Copy Wheel Eye'; English manga: 'Mirror Wheel Eye') is a special ability of the eye that the Uchiha clan holds. The Sharingan can copy any type of jutsu, can see rapid movements, and can cast an illusion on its victim, and Sasuke being the last member of his clan as he holds the Sharingan.) After Sasuke attempts and fails to kill his older brother Itachi, (Note: He destroyed their clan and joined a criminal organization called Akatsuki.) who had shown up in Konoha to kidnap Naruto, he joins Orochimaru, hoping to gain from him the strength needed to kill Itachi. The story takes a turn when Sasuke leaves the village: Tsunade sends a group of ninja, including Naruto, to retrieve Sasuke, but Naruto is unable to persuade or force him to come back. Naruto and Sakura do not give up on Sasuke; Naruto leaves Konoha to receive training from Jiraiya to prepare himself for the next time he encounters Sasuke, while Sakura becomes Tsunade's apprentice.

=== Part II ===
Two and a half years later, Naruto returns from his training with Jiraiya, just as the Akatsuki start kidnapping the hosts of the powerful Tailed Beasts. Team Kakashi and other Leaf ninja fight against them and search for their teammate Sasuke. The Akatsuki succeeds in capturing and extracting, subsequently killing, seven of the nine Tailed Beasts. Gaara, who previously had the One-Tails, survived after a Sand ninja sacrifices their life for Gaara. Meanwhile, Sasuke betrays and kills Orochimaru and faces Itachi to take revenge. After Itachi dies in battle due to an unknown illness, Sasuke learns from the Akatsuki founder Tobi that Itachi had been ordered by Konoha's superiors to destroy his clan to prevent a coup; he accepted, on the condition that Sasuke would be spared. Devastated by this revelation, Sasuke joins the Akatsuki to destroy Konoha in revenge. As Konoha ninja defeat several Akatsuki members, the Akatsuki figurehead leader, Nagato, kills Jiraiya and devastates Konoha, but Naruto defeats and redeems him, earning the village's respect and admiration.

With Nagato's death, Tobi, disguised as Madara Uchiha (one of Konoha's founding fathers), announces that he wants to capture all nine Tailed Beasts to cast an illusion powerful enough to control all humanity and achieve world peace. The leaders of the five ninja villages refuse to help him and instead join forces to confront his faction and allies. That decision results in a Fourth Shinobi World War between the combined armies of the Five Great Countries which totaled up to 80,000 shinobis. It was known as the Allied Shinobi Forces. The Akatsuki's forces consisted of Reanimated shinobi and 100,000 White Zetsu clones. The Five Kage try to conceal the breakout of the war to Naruto by keeping him in a secret island turtle near Kumogakure, or the Village Hidden in the Clouds, but Naruto finds out and escapes from the island with Killer Bee, the host of the Eight-Tails. At that time, Naruto—along with the help of Killer Bee—gains control of his Tailed Beast and the two of them head for the battlefield.

During the conflict, it is revealed that Tobi is Obito Uchiha, a former teammate of Kakashi's who was thought to be dead. The real Madara saved Obito's life, and they have since collaborated. As Sasuke learns the history of Konoha, including the circumstances that led to his clan's downfall, he decides to protect the village and rejoins Naruto and Sakura to thwart Madara and Obito's plans. However, Madara's body ends up possessed by Kaguya Otsutsuki, an ancient princess who intends to subdue all humanity. A reformed Obito sacrifices himself to help the Allies to stop her. Once Kaguya is sealed, Madara dies as well. Sasuke takes advantage of the situation and takes control of all the Tailed Beasts, as he reveals his goal of ending the current village system. Naruto confronts Sasuke to dissuade him from his plan, and after they almost kill each other in a final battle, Sasuke admits defeat and reforms. After the war, Kakashi becomes the Sixth Hokage and pardons Sasuke, Orochimaru, and Kabuto for their crimes. Years later, Kakashi steps down while Naruto marries Hinata Hyuga and becomes the Seventh Hokage, raising the next generation.

== Production ==
=== Development ===
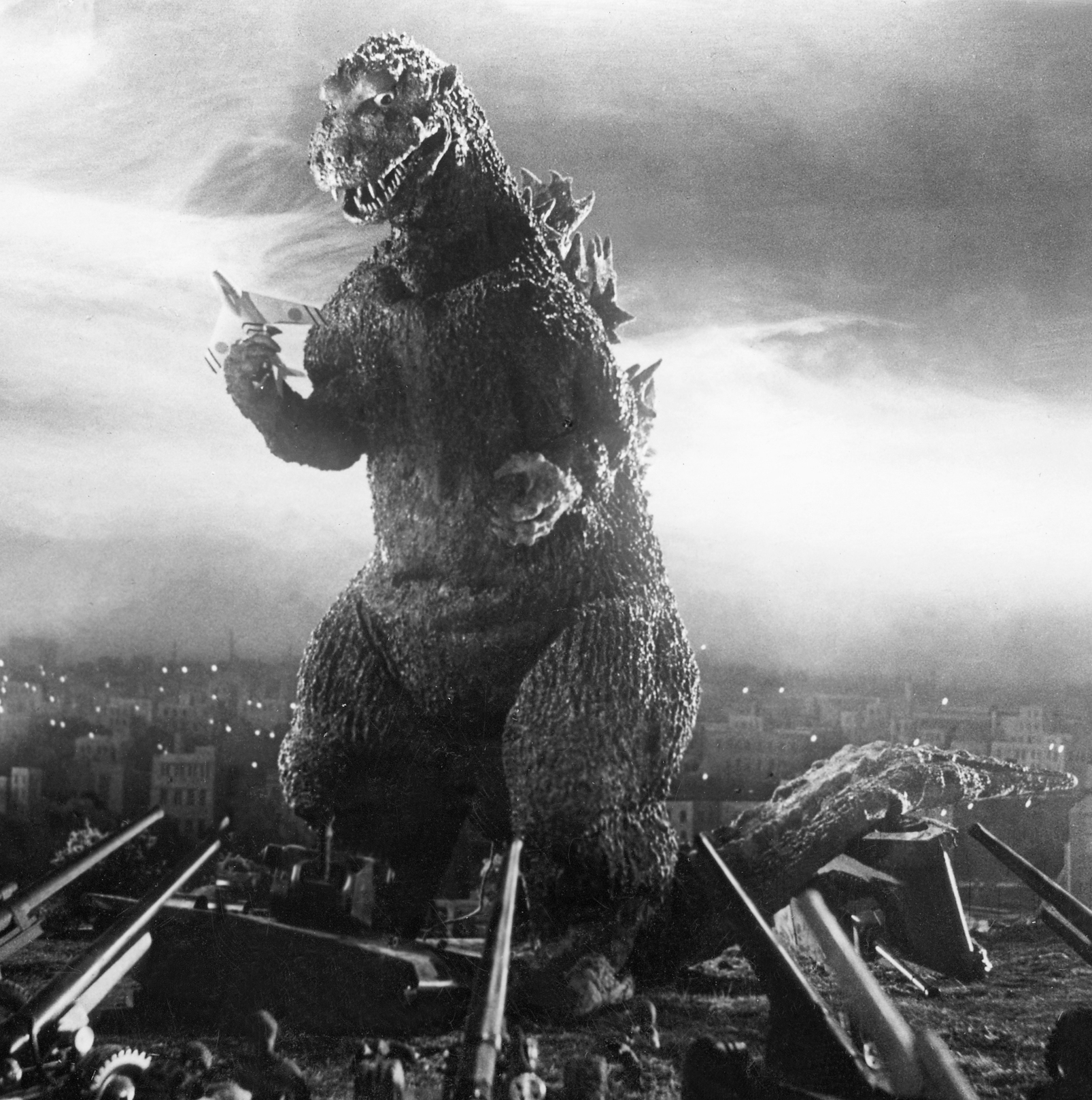
The fictional monster Godzilla inspired the inclusion of mythological beasts in Naruto.

In 1995, Shueisha published Karakuri, a one-shot manga by Masashi Kishimoto, which received an honorable mention in the 1996 Hop Step Award. Dissatisfied with subsequent draft proposals, Kishimoto began developing a new project. An early concept featured Naruto as a chef, but this version was never published. Kishimoto then developed a one-shot for the summer 1997 issue of Akamaru Jump, based on an idea of a boy who could transform into a fox. Despite positive reader feedback, Kishimoto revised the concept into a ninja-themed story due to dissatisfaction with the art and narrative.

The first eight chapters were planned prior to serialization in Weekly Shōnen Jump. Initial drafts featured detailed illustrations of Konoha village, but by the debut, the art emphasized characters over backgrounds. Although Kishimoto was concerned that the use of chakra might make the series overly Japanese, he believed it remained engaging. Inspired by Godzilla, Kishimoto incorporated the tailed beasts mythology to include monster designs. The central theme of Part I is mutual acceptance, exemplified through Naruto's character development.

In Part II, Kishimoto simplified panel layouts and plot structures to enhance readability and avoid excessive stylistic conventions. His artistic style shifted from a classic manga aesthetic toward greater realism. To conclude the Sasuke Uchiha arc within one volume, volume 43 contained additional chapters, leading Kishimoto to apologize for the higher cost.

=== Characters ===
Kishimoto drew inspiration from other shōnen manga while developing characters, aiming for distinctiveness within a Japanese cultural framework. Characters were organized into teams to highlight specialized skills and complementary weaknesses. While romance was challenging to write, it received greater emphasis in Part II, starting with volume 28. Villains were introduced to contrast moral values and highlight ideological conflicts. An ellipsis was used to allow younger characters to age and develop strength, as they were initially outmatched by antagonists.

=== Setting ===
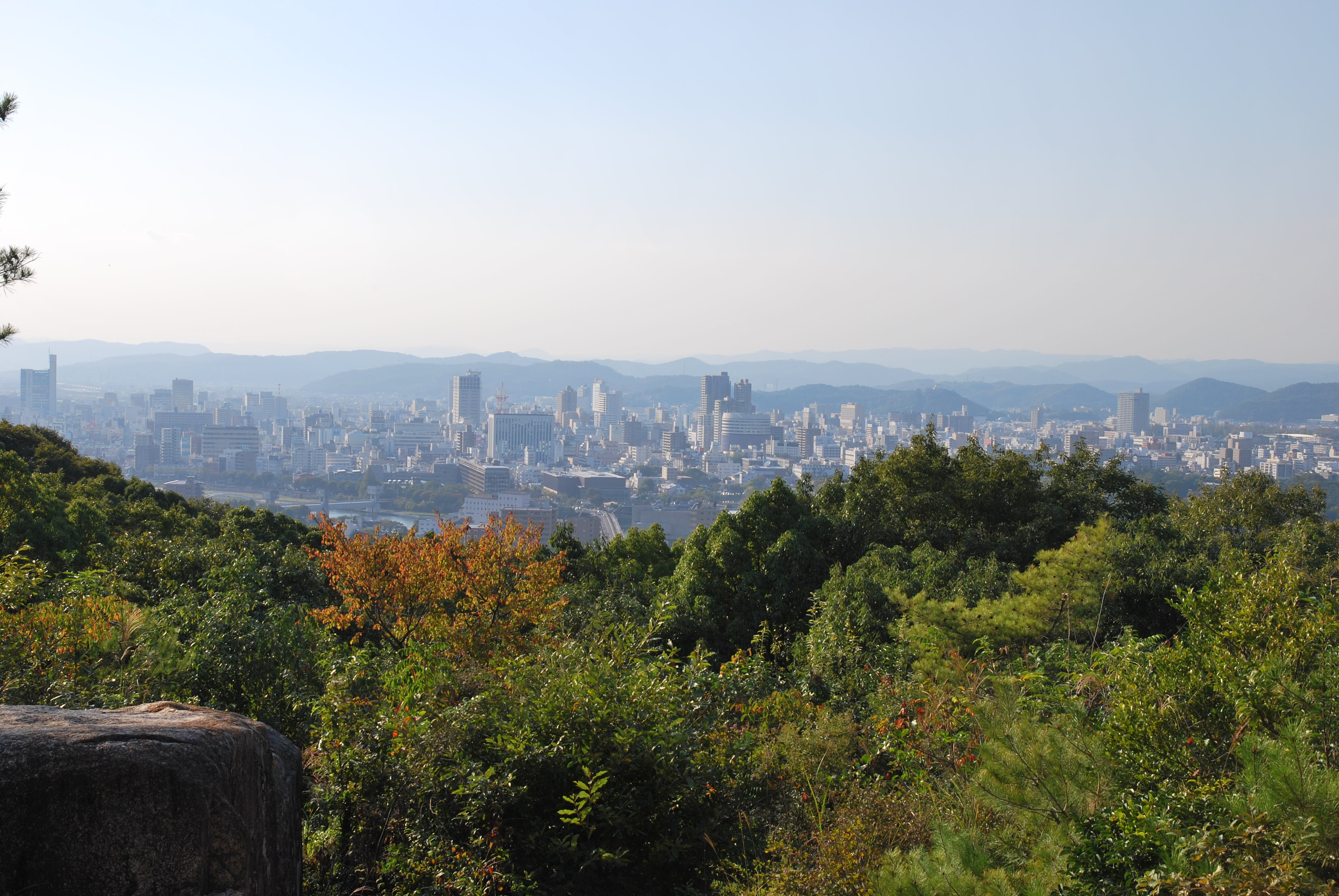
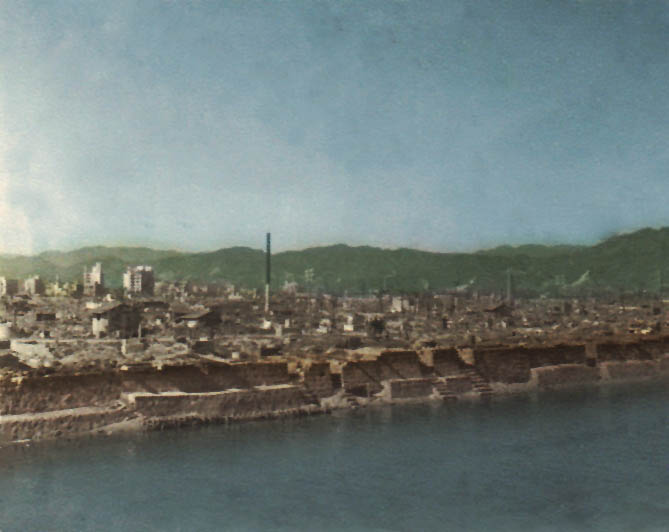
Okayama City served as the basis for Konoha Village, and Hiroshima's wartime influenced the World War conflicts.

Kishimoto incorporated the Chinese zodiac tradition, which has a significant history in Japan; the hand signs used in the series derive from this. The design of Konoha was conceived spontaneously, drawing from the scenery of Kishimoto's hometown in Okayama. The unspecified time period allowed the inclusion of modern elements such as convenience stores, though projectile weapons and vehicles were excluded.

=== Conclusion ===
Kishimoto's childhood proximity to Hiroshima and his grandfather's wartime accounts influenced his portrayal of conflict. He believed that war results from accumulated historical tensions and aimed to depict a nuanced background for the manga's final arc. Unlike his grandfather's stories, Kishimoto intended the Fourth Great Ninja War to convey a sense of hope. The narrative arc involving Nagato established thematic foundations for the ending, particularly through Naruto's forgiveness, which paralleled his eventual reconciliation with Sasuke.

The series' conclusion was delayed due to unspecified issues. Upon the release of volume 66, Kishimoto noted he had reached a long-awaited narrative moment. From the outset, Kishimoto planned to conclude with a battle between Naruto and Sasuke, though he initially considered their backgrounds asymmetrical—Naruto not having experienced war directly, unlike Sasuke, whose family was killed to prevent civil war.

Kishimoto selected Hinata Hyuga as Naruto's romantic partner early in the series, citing her consistent admiration and respect for him as a foundation for a believable relationship. Although romantic subplots were initially considered, significant development was reserved for the 2014 film The Last: Naruto the Movie, for which Kishimoto collaborated with screenwriter Maruo Kyozuka. Naruto's relationship with his son, Boruto, was further explored in the 2015 film Boruto: Naruto the Movie, concluding Naruto's character arc as an adult; this was briefly depicted in the manga's finale.

== Themes ==
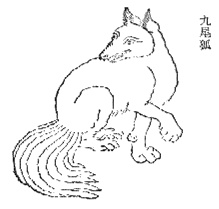
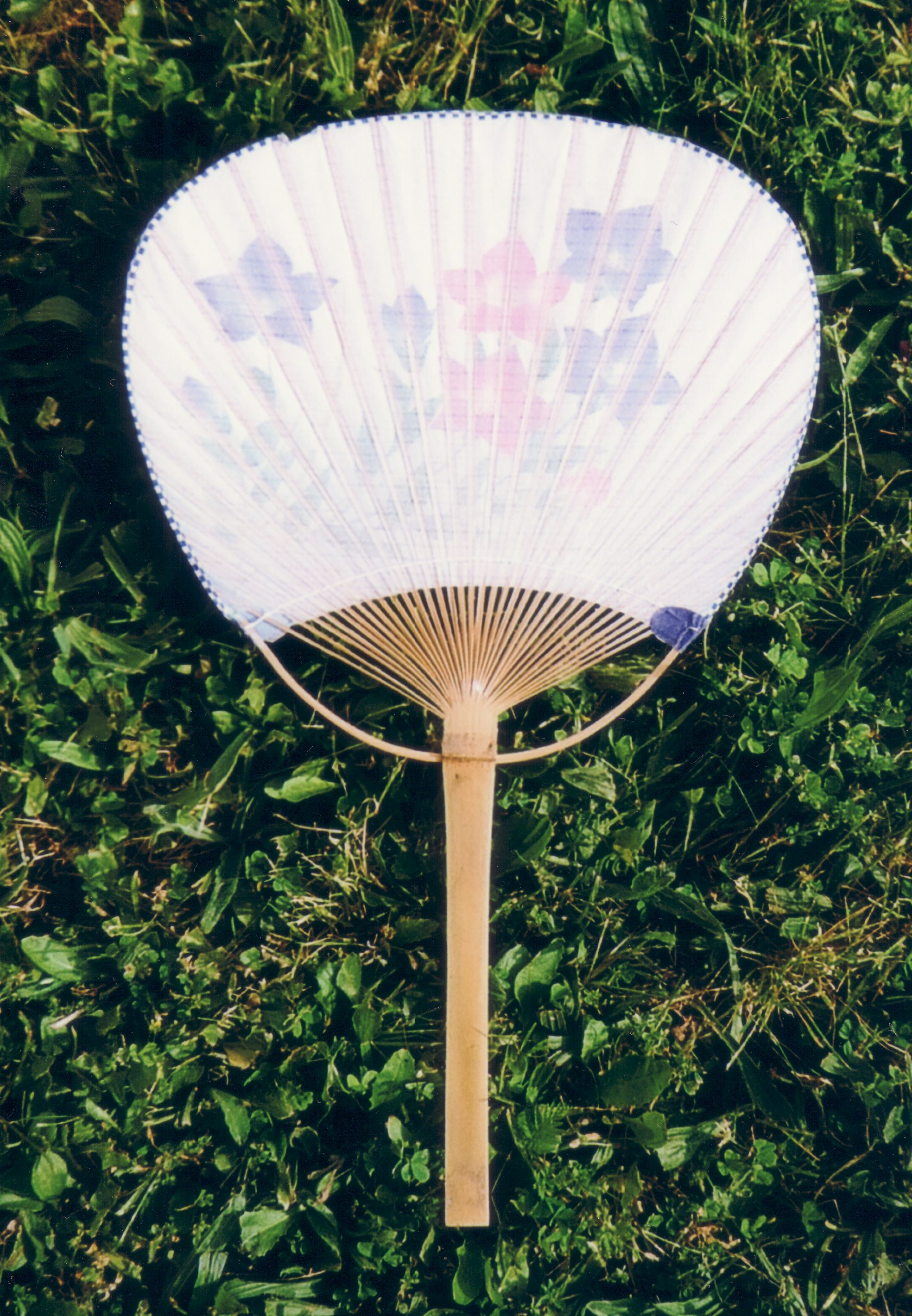
Japanese cultural elements like the kitsune mythology and the uchiwa fan are often referenced in the series.

Amy Plumb argued that Kishimoto's use of references to Japanese mythology in Naruto was intended to add further layers to the story. Kishimoto expected readers to decode these references, thereby avoiding direct explanations. As an example, the character Itachi employs three ninja techniques named after Shinto deities: Tsukiyomi, Amaterasu, and Susano-o. Plumb also cited the heraldic symbol of Sasuke's clan, a fan known as an uchiwa. Such fans appear in Japanese myths as tools to exorcise evil by blowing it away; Sasuke discovers late in the series that he has the ability to "blow away" the Nine-Tailed Fox's influence on Naruto. Foxes (kitsune tsuki) are tricksters in Japanese mythology, and in some stories, they take over human bodies. Plumb commented on the obvious similarities to the Nine-Tails sealed inside Naruto and to the pranks Naruto plays.

Christopher A. Born observed that the Naruto storyline contains traditional Confucian values and suggested that students who analyze manga such as Naruto and Bleach would learn more about Confucianism than from studying its abstract ideas alone. Norman Melchor Robles Jr. evaluated the portrayal of both positive and negative ideas in Naruto by counting words in the script associated either with violence or with positive values; he found that a small majority of tagged words were violent but commented that the depiction of violence appeared organized to show how positive strategies by the protagonists could overcome it. Sheuo Hui Gan considered the series to have a set of "traditional ethical values". She also compared the treatment of alienation in Naruto, which Naruto overcomes by joining his society, to its portrayal in Akira and Neon Genesis Evangelion, where the main characters remain alienated.

Several critics described Naruto as a coming-of-age story. Psychologist Lawrence C. Rubin suggested that the storylines would appeal to readers of any age who had lost loved ones, had difficulty finding friends, or faced other situations depicted in the series. According to a study examining readers’ ability to identify character types from physical cues, Sasuke was classified as an INTJ (Myers–Briggs) character, making him a foil to Naruto. Rik Spanjers described Sasuke’s divergence from Naruto as tragic but argued that the contrast between the protagonists’ worldviews was essential to the plot, writing that "Naruto's strength grows as he gains more loved ones to protect, while Sasuke remains alone and is increasingly absorbed by his quest for revenge". Beatriz Peña linked Sasuke’s antagonism in the series to its recurring theme of war, noting that the Uchiha clan was massacred to prevent a potential civil war against Konohagakure, which deepened the bond between Sasuke and Naruto.

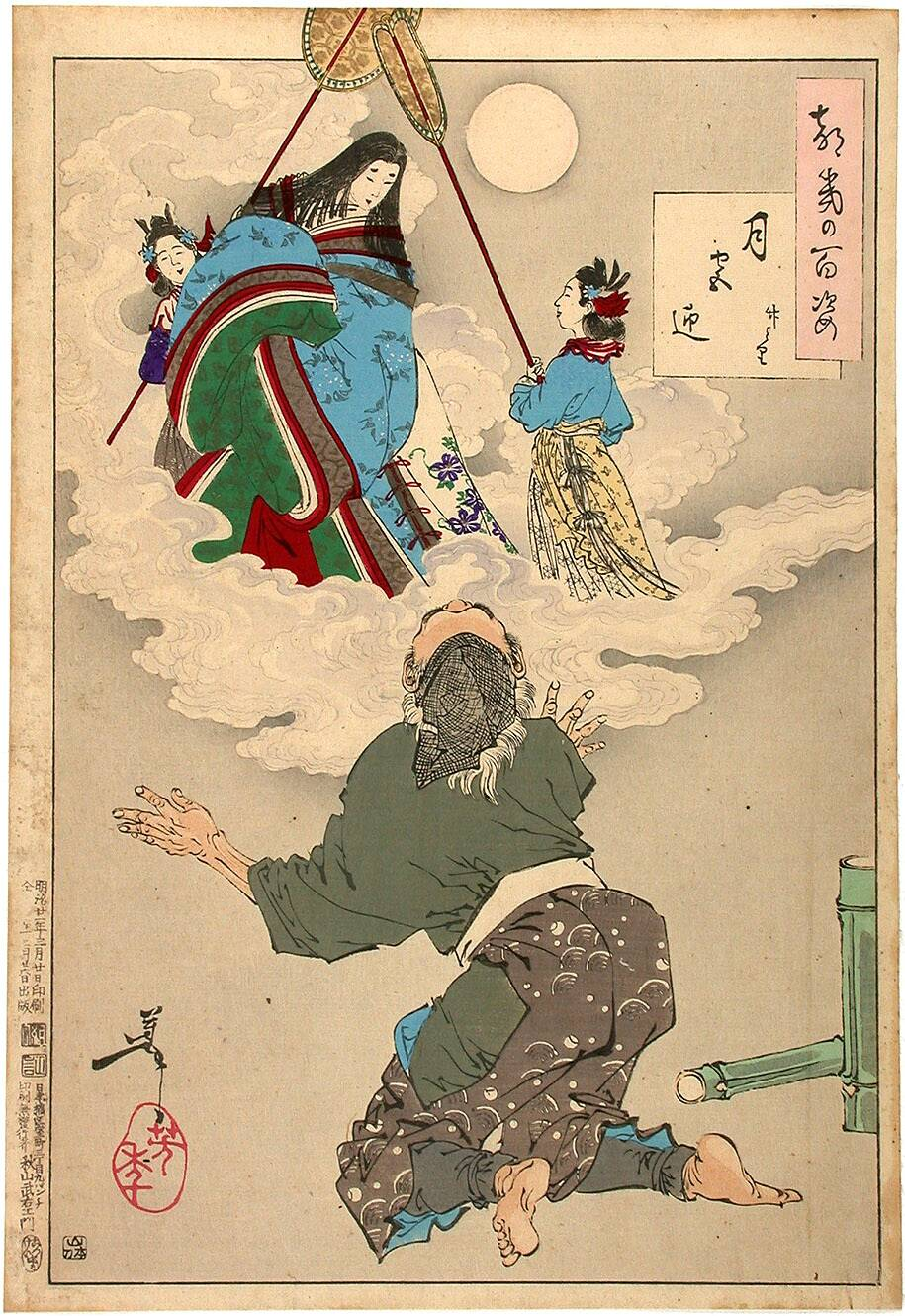
Kaguya's character is based on The Tale of the Bamboo Cutter, with her family being explored in Naruto sequels

Omote Tomoyuki observed that there were many humorous moments in the story despite the difficulties Naruto faced, but that the comedic elements diminished dramatically over time as Naruto grew into a teenager, particularly after Part II began. Weekly Shōnen Jump began serializing comedies such as Gintama and Reborn! from 2003 onwards, and in Tomoyuki's view, this partly explained the change in emphasis: Naruto "was not supposed to provide laughter anymore". Simone Levy of The Lawrentian described Naruto's character development as an embodiment of the bildungsroman genre, emphasizing that his growth throughout the story was essential to advancing the plot. Born to older-than-average parents, Naruto lacked adequate parenting, which left him emotionally vulnerable at the start of the series. Unaware of his parents' identities, he sought to fulfill his mother's wish for him to become a hero and the leader of his village, the Hokage. Although initially depicted as weak, Naruto drew strength from his mentors, Kakashi and Jiraiya, as well as his relationships with Sakura and Sasuke. After Jiraiya's death, Naruto resolved to achieve his mentor's goal of ending wars and breaking the cycle of hatred, allowing Kishimoto to deepen the character's resonance with readers while portraying his maturation. Levy concluded that Naruto successfully fulfilled the concept of bildungsroman, an achievement that she argued eluded many other fictional characters.

Piotr Konieczny of The Encyclopedia of Science Fiction compared the significant development of Naruto in the latter half of the series to that of a messianic figure, as he participated in a war against villains who sought to place society under illusions while also resolving his personal conflict with Sasuke. The series increasingly embraces science fiction tropes as it progresses. Although the de facto alien Ōtsutsuki clan was revealed as the true mastermind behind the Akatsuki, their identities and backstory were not explored until the sequel The Last: Naruto the Movie and in Boruto, where the protagonist's son takes his place in a new conflict against the remnants of the clan. Konieczny observed that Naruto encounters multiple antagonists whose motivations stemmed from tragic circumstances caused by past wars, and that Naruto makes peace with them over the course of the story. Naruto influenced several series released years later, including My Hero Academia and Ninjago. The Ōtsutsuki characters are based on Japanese mythology, particularly The Tale of the Bamboo Cutter from the Heian period, in which Princess Kaguya is an alien from the moon who visits Earth.

== Media ==
=== Manga ===
Written and illustrated by Masashi Kishimoto, Naruto was serialized for a 15-year run in Shueisha's magazine, Weekly Shōnen Jump from September 21, 1999, to November 10, 2014. Shueisha collected its chapters in 72 tankōbon volumes—27 for Part I, and the rest for Part II; they were released between March 3, 2000, and February 4, 2015. The first 238 chapters are Part I and constitute the first part of the Naruto storyline. Chapters 239 to 244 include a gaiden (side-story) focusing on Kakashi Hatake's background. The remaining chapters (245 to 700) belong to Part II, which continues the story after a 2 1/2-year gap in the internal timeline. Shueisha have also released several ani-manga tankōbon, each based on one of the Naruto movies, and has released the series in Japanese for cell phone download on their website Shueisha Manga Capsule. A miniseries titled Naruto: The Seventh Hokage and the Scarlet Spring, (Note: NARUTO(ナルト)外伝・七代目火影と緋色の花つ月, Naruto Gaiden: Nanadaime Hokage to Akairo no Hanatsuzuki) centered on the main characters' children, began serialization in the Japanese and English editions of Weekly Shōnen Jump on April 27, 2015, and ended after ten chapters on July 6 of the same year.

Naruto was scanlated (translated by fans) and available online before a licensed version was released in North America; the rights were acquired by Viz Media, which began serializing Naruto in their anthology comic magazine Shonen Jump, starting with the January 2003 issue. The schedule was accelerated at the end of 2007 to catch up with the Japanese version, and again in early 2009, with 11 volumes (from 34 to 44) appearing in three months, after which it returned to a quarterly schedule. All 27 volumes of Part I were released in a boxed set on August 12, 2008. On May 3, 2011, Viz started selling the manga in an omnibus format with each book containing three volumes.

The franchise has been licensed in 90 countries, and the manga serialized in 35 countries. Madman Entertainment began publishing Naruto volumes in Australia and New Zealand in March 2008 after reaching a distribution deal with Viz Media. Carlsen Comics has licensed the series, through its regional divisions, and released the series in German and Danish. The series is also licensed for regional language releases in French and Dutch by Kana; in Polish by Japonica Polonica Fantastica; in Russian by Comix-ART; in Finnish by Sangatsu Manga; in Swedish by Bonnier Carlsen; and Italian by Panini Comics.

==== Spin-offs and others ====
A spin-off comedy manga by Kenji Taira, titled Naruto SD: Rock Lee no Seishun Full-Power Ninden, (Note: NARUTO(ナルト) SD ロック・リーの青春フルパワー忍伝; Naruto Spin-Off: Rock Lee & His Ninja Pals) focuses on the character Rock Lee, a character who aspires to be strong as a ninja but has no magical jutsu abilities. It ran in Shueisha's Saikyō Jump magazine from December 3, 2010, to July 4, 2014, and was made into an anime series, produced by Studio Pierrot and premiering on TV Tokyo on April 3, 2012. Crunchyroll simulcasted the series' premiere on their website and streamed the following episodes. Taira also wrote Uchiha Sasuke no Sharingan Den, (Note: うちはサスケの写輪眼伝; Sasuke Uchiha's Sharingan Legend) which released on October 3, 2014, running in the same magazine and featuring Sasuke.

A monthly sequel series titled Boruto: Naruto Next Generations began serialization in the Japanese and English editions of Weekly Shōnen Jump in early 2016, illustrated by Mikio Ikemoto and written by Ukyō Kodachi, with supervision by Kishimoto. Ikemoto was Kishimoto's chief assistant during the run of the original Naruto series, and Kodachi was his writing partner for the film Boruto: Naruto the Movie. The monthly series was preceded by a one-shot, titled Naruto: The Path Lit by the Full Moon (NARUTO-ナルト-外伝 ～満ちた月が照らす道～, Naruto Gaiden ~Michita Tsuki ga Terasu Michi~), written and illustrated by Kishimoto and published on April 25 of that same year. The staff of Shueisha asked Kishimoto if he would write a sequel to Naruto. However, Kishimoto refused the offer and offered his former assistant Mikio Ikemoto and writer Ukyō Kodachi to write Boruto: Naruto Next Generations as the sequel to Naruto.

Another one-shot chapter by Kishimoto, titled Naruto: The Whorl Within the Spiral (NARUTO-ナルト-外伝 ～渦の中のつむじ風～, Naruto Gaiden ~Uzu no Naka no Tsumujikaze~), centered on Naruto's father, Minato Namikaze, was published in Weekly Shōnen Jump on July 18, 2023.

A crossover comic with Teenage Mutant Ninja Turtles, titled Teenage Mutant Ninja Turtles × Naruto, ran for four issues from November 13, 2024, to June 4, 2025. The comic was written by Caleb Goellner, with drawing by Hendry Prasetya, coloring by Raúl Angulo, and lettering by Ed Dukeshire. Jorge Jiménez and Prasetya drew the cover art for the first issue. The trade paperback edition was published on October 7, 2025.

On October 10, 2026, at the "Naruto: What's Next?" panel at New York Comic Con, it was announced that Kishimoto will create a new manga titled Naruto Shadow Rising.

=== Anime ===
The first Naruto anime television series, directed by Hayato Date and produced by Pierrot and Aniplex, premiered on TV Tokyo in Japan on October 3, 2002, and concluded on February 8, 2007, after 220 episodes. The first 135 episodes were adapted from Part I of the manga; the remaining 85 episodes are original and use plot elements that are not in the manga. Tetsuya Nishio was the character designer for Naruto when the manga was adapted into an anime; Kishimoto had requested that Nishio be given this role.

The second anime television series, titled Naruto: Shippuden, (Note: NARUTO(ナルト) 疾風伝, Naruto Shippūden; lit. 'Naruto: Hurricane Chronicles') was also produced by Pierrot and directed by Hayato Date, and serves as a direct sequel to the first Naruto anime series, corresponding to Part II of the manga. It debuted on TV Tokyo on February 15, 2007, and concluded on March 23, 2017.

A series of four "brand-new" episodes, to commemorate the original anime's 20th anniversary, were originally scheduled to premiere on September 3, 2023; however, in August of that same year, it was announced that the episodes would be postponed to a later date. In September 2026, Viz Media announced that the Naruto franchise will receive a new "limited" anime television series. On October 10, 2026, the Naruto: What's Next? panel at New York Comic Con announced that the series will consist of a crossover with Ninku. It will be directed by Noriyuki Abe, and Tetsuya Nishio, who worked on both the Ninku and Naruto anime series, will serve as character designer and chief animation director.

=== Films ===
The series was also adapted into 11 theatrical films and 12 original video animations (OVAs). In July 2015, Lionsgate announced the development of a live action film with Avi Arad through his production company Arad Productions. The film was planned to be directed by Michael Gracey. On December 17, 2016, Kishimoto announced that he has been asked to co-develop. On November 27, 2023, it was announced that Tasha Huo will work on the script for the film. On February 23, 2024, Gracey had exited the project, and Destin Daniel Cretton had been hired to direct and co-write the film. Cretton received his blessings from Kishimoto, after a visit in Tokyo, with Kishimoto stating that when he heard that Cretton would be directing, he thought that he was the perfect choice. On July 10, 2026, it was announced that global auditions had begun for the main characters, Naruto, Sasuke, and Sakura, with auditions for other characters to follow at a later date. A month later, it was reported that Charles Melton was in final negotiations to play Kakashi. On November 3, 2026, it was announced that Sony Pictures would co-finance the film and handle its international distribution, with production set to begin in Q2 2027.

=== Novels ===
Twenty-six Naruto light novels, the first nine written by Masatoshi Kusakabe, have been published in Japan. Of these, the first two have been released in English in North America. The first adapted novel, Naruto: Innocent Heart, Demonic Blood (2002), retells a Team 7 mission in which they encounter the assassins Zabuza and Haku; the second, Naruto: Mission: Protect the Waterfall Village! (2003) was based on the second OVA of the anime. Viz has also published 16 chapter books written by Tracey West with illustrations from the manga. Unlike the series, these books were aimed at children ages seven to ten.

Thirteen original novels have appeared in Japan; eleven of these are part of a series, and the other two are independent novels unconnected to the series. The first independent novel, titled Naruto: Tales of a Gutsy Ninja (2009), is presented as an in-universe novel written by Naruto's master Jiraiya. It follows the adventures of a fictional shinobi named Naruto Musasabi, who served as Naruto's namesake. The other independent novel, Naruto Jinraiden: The Day the Wolf Howled (2012), is set shortly after Sasuke's fight with Itachi. Itachi Shinden, which consists of two novels, and Sasuke Shinden, a single novel, both appeared in 2015, and both were adapted into anime arcs in Naruto: Shippuden in 2016, titled Naruto Shippūden: Itachi Shinden-hen: Hikari to Yami and Book of Sunrise respectively. Hiden is a series of six light novels published in 2015 that explores the stories of various characters after the ending of the manga.

== Merchandise ==
=== Video games ===
Naruto video games have been published by various companies for consoles such as those by Nintendo, Sony, and Microsoft. The majority of them are fighting games in which the player directly controls one of the characters from Naruto. The player pits their character against another character controlled by the game's AI or by another player; the objective is to reduce the opponent's health to zero using basic attacks as well as special techniques unique to each character derived from techniques they use in the Naruto anime or manga. The first Naruto video game was Naruto: Konoha Ninpōchō, which was released in Japan on March 27, 2003, for the WonderSwan Color. Most Naruto video games have been released only in Japan. The first games released outside of Japan were the Naruto: Gekitou Ninja Taisen series and the Naruto: Saikyou Ninja Daikesshu series, released in North America under the titles of Naruto: Clash of Ninja and Naruto: Ninja Council. In 2025, Bandai Namco announced that the Naruto video games had sold over 37.86 million units worldwide. Although all video games features characters from manga, Lars Alexandersson from the Tekken fighting series appeared in CyberConnect2's Naruto Shippuden: Ultimate Ninja Storm 2 because game designer Hiroshi Matsuyama was impressed by the alternate costume designed by Kishimoto for Tekken 6.

=== Art and guidebooks ===
Three official artbooks based on the Naruto series have been released. The first two, titled Art Collection: Uzumaki, and Illustration Collection: Naruto, were released in Japan in 2004 and 2009, with North American editions following in 2007 and 2010 respectively. The third artbook Illustration Collection: Naruto Uzumaki, was published in 2015 in Japan and later the same year in North America; it contains artwork originally on Shonen Jump comic covers. It has no text except a brief commentary by Kishimoto about his favorite artworks. An interactive coloring book called Paint Jump: Art of Naruto was released in 2008. An unreleased artbook titled Naruto Exhibition Official Guest Book by Masashi Kishimoto was given to those who attended the Naruto art exhibition at the Mori Art Museum on April 25, 2015.

Four guidebooks titled First Official Data Book through Fourth Official Data Book have been released; the first two cover Part I of the manga, and were released in 2002 and 2005; the third and fourth volumes appeared in 2008 and 2014. These books contain character profiles, Jutsu guides, and drafts by Kishimoto. For the anime, a series of guidebooks called Naruto Anime Profiles was released. These books contain information about the production of the anime episodes and explanations of the characters' designs. A manga fan book titled Secret: Writings from the Warriors Official Fanbook appeared in 2002, and another fan book was released to commemorate the series' 10th anniversary, including illustrations of Naruto Uzumaki by other manga artists, a novel, Kishimoto's one-shot titled Karakuri, and an interview between Kishimoto and Yoshihiro Togashi.

=== Collectible card game ===
Several Naruto Collectible Card Game sets were released in Japan by Bandai between 2002 and 2006, and the first set was released in North America in 2006. The game is played between two players using a customized deck of fifty cards from the set, and a game mat. To win, a player must either earn ten "battle rewards" through their actions in the game or cause the other player to exhaust their deck. The cards were released in named sets called "series", in the form of four 50-card pre-constructed box sets. Each set includes a starter deck, the game mat, a turn-counter, and one stainless steel "Ninja Blade Coin". Extra cards were available in 10-card booster packs, and deck sets. Four box sets sold in retailers were available for each series. Cards for each set were available in collectible tins, containing several booster packs and exclusive promotional cards in a metal box. By October 2006, seventeen series had been released in Japan with 417 unique cards. By August 2008, ten of these series had been released in North America. A new card game, Naruto Card Game, is set to release worldwide in June 2027.

=== Board games ===
Several board games based on the series have been released, including Naruto Shippuden Deck-Building Game (2014), Naruto Shippuden: The Board Game (2016), and Naruto: Ninja Arena (2020).

== Reception ==
=== Sales ===
The manga has 250 million copies in circulation worldwide, making it one of the best-selling manga series in history. More than half of the total circulation is in Japan, with the remaining circulation being from 46 other countries and regions. It has become one of North American publisher Viz Media's best-selling manga series; their translation of the series appeared on the USA Today and The New York Times bestseller lists several times. It was included in the fiction section of the Teacher Librarian's recommended list for 2008, and School Library Journal described it as an essential manga for school libraries. Volume 28 of the manga reached seventeenth place in the USA Today Booklist in its first week of release in March 2008, only two places short of the record for a manga, held by Fruits Basket. The volume had one of the biggest debut weeks of any manga in years, becoming the top-selling manga volume of 2008 and the second best-selling book in North America. In 2010, Viz, the publisher, commented on the loyalty of readers, who reliably continued to buy the manga as the volume count went over 40.

=== Critical response ===
Several reviewers commented on Naruto's balance between fight scenes and plot development; A. E. Sparrow of IGN and Casey Brienza of Anime News Network felt that the result was a strong storyline, but Carl Kimlinger, also writing for the same website, suggested that there were too many fights, which slowed down the plot. Kimlinger liked the character designs, and approved of the fight scenes themselves, which also drew positive comments from Rik Spanjers, who felt that the excitement of the scenes depended on Kishimoto's skill in depicting action. Javier Lugo, writing for Manga Life, agreed, describing the artwork as "dramatic, exciting, and just right for the story he's telling". Briana Lawrence from Mania Entertainment said the growth of the characters gave Part II an adult feel. Writing for IGN, Ramsey Isler called Jutsu one of the most entertaining concepts in Naruto, stating as well that their diversity, complex signs required for techniques, the unique physical features, and the sheer destructive power of Ninjutsu are the elements that have made the series widely popular.

In a review of volume 28, Brienza also praised Part II's storyline and characterization, though she commented that not every volume reached a high level of quality. The fights across Part II received praise, most notably Naruto's and Sasuke's, resulting in major changes into their character arcs. Meanwhile, the final battle between the two characters in the finale earned major praise for the choreography and art provided as well as how in depth the two's personalities were shown in the aftermath. However, some writers criticized Kaguya being the least entertaining villain, making the showdown between Naruto and Sasuke more appealing as a result. The finale earned nearly perfect scores from both Anime News Network and Comic Book Bin, with the latter acclaiming the popularity of the title character.

Responding to Naruto's success, Kishimoto said in Naruto Collector Winter 2007/2008 that he was "very glad that the American audience has accepted and understood ninja. It shows that the American audience has good taste [...] because it means they can accept something previously unfamiliar to them." Gō Itō, a professor in the manga department of Tokyo Polytechnic University, compared the series' development to the manga of Dragon Ball, saying that both manga present good illustrations of three-dimensional body movements that successfully capture the characters' martial arts. Gō felt readers could empathize with the characters in Naruto via their inner monologue during battles. The series also influenced the 2010 Scott Pilgrim vs. The World, with director Edgar Wright saying he was inspired by how whenever there was a "killer move" in the manga, it led to an impact in the background following any technique's usage.

When the manga ended, multiple authors from the magazine expressed congratulations to Kishimoto for his work. The fight scenes in general earned acclaim for how well written they were, something game developer CyberConnect2 took into account when developing the Naruto games.

In The Encyclopedia of Science Fiction, Piotr Konieczny described Naruto as an ambitious work of long-form serialized storytelling, praising its worldbuilding, inventive action choreography, and the cumulative payoff of its extensive foreshadowing and large ensemble cast. He argued that these qualities helped establish the series as a landmark of serialized shōnen storytelling and international children's science fiction.

=== Awards and accolades ===
Naruto won the Quill Award for graphic novel in 2006. In April 2007, volume 14 earned the Viz the Manga Trade Paperback of the Year Gem Award from Diamond Comic Distributors. The manga was nominated for Favorite Manga Series in Nickelodeon Magazine's 2009 Comics Awards. It won the 16th Spanish Manga Barcelona award for the shonen category in 2010. In 2015, the manga was nominated for the 19th Tezuka Osamu Cultural Prize. Kishimoto was the winner of Rookie of the Year for the series in the Japanese government's Agency for Cultural Affairs 2014 Minister of Education, Culture, Sports, Science, and Technology Fine Arts Recommendation Awards. On TV Asahi's Manga Sōsenkyo 2021 poll, in which 150,000 people voted for their top 100 manga series, Naruto ranked seventh.

== Legacy and cultural impact ==
In 2006, the protagonist Naruto Uzumaki became the first anime character to be included in Newsweek Japan's "100 Japanese People the World Respects" list. "Naruto" was the fourth most popular search term on Yahoo Search in 2007, only behind Britney Spears, WWE, and Paris Hilton; it was seventh in 2008, and sixth in 2009. In December 2023, it was announced that the Naruto anime adaptation was the most-searched anime on Google in the past 25 years. In 2025, the series received a dedicated Easter egg on Google Search.

In 2022, the Brooklyn Public Library reported that the first volume of Naruto was the seventh most-borrowed book of the past 125 years. Christel Hoolans, managing director of Kana and Le Lombard, said that Naruto is the first series since Dragon Ball to become a classic in France.

The series has inspired manga artists such as Kohei Horikoshi (My Hero Academia), Yūki Tabata (Black Clover), Koyoharu Gotouge (Demon Slayer: Kimetsu no Yaiba), Gege Akutami (Jujutsu Kaisen), and Takeru Hokazono (Kagurabachi). Shingo Kimura, the illustrator of the Naruto: Sasuke's Story manga, cited Kishimoto and Naruto as his main sources of inspiration. Comic book artist Whilce Portacio commented on the influence of the series on American comic books.

Naruto has inspired bands like Kana-Boon, Bad Omens, and Ankor. Musician Kenshi Yonezu said that Naruto inspired him to dream of becoming a manga artist before ultimately deciding to pursue a music career. Naruto has attracted a generation of rap and hip-hop artists and has been referenced in songs from artists like XXXTentacion, Lil Uzi Vert, SahBabii, Duckwrth, Denzel Curry, Robb Banks, Xavier Wulf, DRAM, Saba, Sir Michael Rocks, Megan Thee Stallion, and Eminem.

The series has served as a reference and inspiration for video games such as .hack, Darksiders II, Final Fantasy XIV, Akane, Strinova, and Shinobi: Art of Vengeance, and has been referenced in video games such as Apex Legends, Overwatch, Assassin's Creed Shadows, and Fortnite.

In 2023, it was reported that Naruto has helped increase the popularity of ramen outside of Japan, and according to a 2024 survey by the Japan Food Product Overseas Promotion Center (JFOODO), Naruto is the anime series that inspires foreigners the most to try Japanese food.

An indoor theme park, titled "Naruto World", opened in Shanghai, China, on January 25, 2020. A Naruto-themed amusement park titled "Konoha Land" opened in France on April 4, 2026.

== Notes ==
Language notes

General notes
