= Tetsuya Nishio =

Japanese animator and character designer (born 1968)

Tetsuya Nishio (西尾 鉄也, Nishio Tetsuya; born 23 June 1968 in Aichi Prefecture) is a Japanese animator, character designer and puzzle setter.

Nishio began his career as an inbetweener for the TV series Osomatsu-kun (1988). He worked for Studio Pierrot on Ninku (1995-1996). Since he was hired to work on Jin-Roh: The Wolf Brigade (1999), he has worked for Production I.G., having previously done freelance work. Minipato came about because Nishio made some promotional character illustrations which Patlabor series creator Oshii liked. Nishio was also a key animator on Millennium Actress (2001), and The Cat Returns (2002). He won the Tokyo Anime Award for best character design at the Tokyo International Anime Fair for his work on The Sky Crawlers in 2009. Nishio is particularly noted for his designs of older men.

Masashi Kishimoto requested that Tetsuya Nishio oversee the character designs of Naruto when the manga was adapted into an anime series.

An artbook has been released of his works, called The Art of Tetsuya Nishio: Full Spectrum.

Nishio is also a professional puzzle setter. Described by the The Times as "the undisputed grand puzzle master of sudoku", he creates about 15 puzzles per day (as of 2025). He is also credited with the invention of killer sudoku, a sudoku variation.
