= Madara Uchiha =

Fictional character from Naruto Series, often known as the 'Ghost of the Uchiha'

- Naruto character
- Madara Uchiha as drawn by Masashi Kishimoto
- First appearance: Naruto chapter 370: Unease (2007)
- Created by: Masashi Kishimoto
- Voiced by: Japanese: Naoya Uchida (Original); Go Inoue (Young); English: Neil Kaplan (Original); Xander Mobus (Young)

In-universe information
- Ninja status: Rogue Ninja

Madara Uchiha (Japanese: うちは マダラ, Hepburn: Uchiha Madara) is a fictional character and one of the two main antagonists in Masashi Kishimoto's manga (and anime adaptation) Naruto. He appears for the first time in "Part II" of the manga and the Shippuden anime adaptation (During the Fourth Shinobi War Arc).

He, along with its First Hokage Hashirama Senju, is one of the co-founders of Konohagakure (Japanese: 木ノ葉隠れの里, Hepburn: Konohagakure no Sato) village also known as the Village Hidden in the Leaves. Their power conflict over how to run the village, as well as the long-time feud between clans, leads to Madara deciding that humanity is beyond saving and seeks to cast a genjutsu (infinite tsukuyomi) on the entire planet, however, he is not aware that this plan will eventually annihilate humanity and turn them into numerous variants of White Zetsu. This leads to his defection and death in a battle with Hashirama; however, it is revealed later that Madara secretly revived himself, surviving well into elderhood, and manipulating Obito Uchiha into laying the key for his future plans before his true death.

During most of the series, Madara serves simply as a posthumous background and influential figure while Obito uses Madara's name to create an aura around himself. However, this changes when Kabuto Yakushi reanimates the real Madara, who eventually teams up with Obito, before betraying him and becomes a major threat until he is disposed of by Black Zetsu.

Kishimoto created the character to provide a strong villain in the series' final arc who would face the series' protagonist, Naruto Uzumaki and Sasuke Uchiha. This confrontation would be different from that with previous enemies and result in more of a focus on fight scenes. Merchandise has been released in Madara's likeness, including keychains, plush dolls, and figurines. In the Japanese anime, Naoya Uchida voices Madara, while Go Inoue voices him as a child. In the English version, Neil Kaplan provides Madara's voice with Xander Mobus voicing him as a child. Critics have commented on his role as an antagonist in the series. Some have placed him on top all-time anime villains lists, while others have criticized certain contrivances associated with his actions. Nevertheless, Madara's background was well-received for how integral his story is to the series' scenario. Madara has appeared in several pieces of Naruto media, and many Naruto video games, as well as the crossover games J-Stars Victory VS and Jump Force, have featured him as a playable character.

== Creation and design ==

Madara's Mangekyō Sharingan (above) before its transformation to Eternal Mangekyō Sharingan (below)

Madara's Rinnegan

Madara originated from Masashi Kishimoto's desire to elaborate on the ending to the manga series Naruto. Once the series began its second part, simply referred to as "Part II" in the manga and Shippuden in the anime, Kishimoto felt the need to create a story arc that would emphasize the tragedy of wars, leading to the final arc which would include a war. According to Kishimoto, Naruto and his group were weak as children in the first part and he wanted to make them stronger in the second part. This is the reason he introduced the Akatsuki (and later on Madara) as their enemies. In an interview, Kishimoto asserted that making the villains "flamboyant" was one of the "guiding principles" he followed. He desired to create villains with "powerful auras". Madara appears late in the manga, as one of the masterminds leading to the fourth shinobi world war, in the final arc. Nevertheless, he wanted to make him an engaging antagonist who would clash with Sasuke Uchiha and the Tailed Beast known as the Ten Tails to give the storyline a proper conclusion.

According to Kishimoto, Madara is not just like any other character introduced in the series. He created Madara as a character with no weaknesses. As one of the central antagonists in the story, Kishimoto designed Madara Uchiha to serve as a complex figure whose methods and goals contrast sharply with the protagonists' values, epitomizing the traits of an anti-villain. Unlike a traditional villain, Madara's actions are driven by a desire to create a world without conflict, believing that his radical approach—creating a new world order through the Infinite Tsukuyomi—is the only viable solution to end the relentless cycle of war and suffering. His methods, although unethical and extreme, stem from a vision of peace, setting him apart from typical antagonistic figures who pursue power or chaos for selfish reasons. This blend of noble intentions with morally ambiguous actions makes Madara an exemplary anti-villain, as his goals, while seemingly benevolent, are achieved through questionable means that challenge the moral foundations of the story's protagonists. Kishimoto also said Naruto always defeated his enemies without intending to kill them by settling disputes with words since his battle with Nagato. Naruto truly forgave his enemy instead of having to kill them, a concept Kishimoto liked but which no other shonen manga truly followed. Kishimoto found the idea of the two characters interacting and settling their differences more interesting, and challenging, rather than killing them. So from the Nagato battle onwards, he decided to introduce the resurrected Madara to have someone to beat. According to Kishimoto, this was one of the reasons why he introduced Edo-Madara into the storyline. But he confessed this was complicated at first. It ended up with confusion about the difference between the two characters.

Japanese voice actor Naoya Uchida enjoyed voicing Madara's character, most notably in his final recording where he sent regards to fellow actor Kazuhiko Inoue (Kakashi Hatake) and Wataru Takagi (Obito Uchiha). Neil Kaplan first voiced Madara in the video game Naruto Shippuden: Ultimate Ninja Storm 3. Because CyberConnect2's fighting game's storyline preceded the television series' plot, he was asked by their staff to read the series' manga to get an idea of the character. Kaplan said this made it difficult for him to voice Madara for the first time.

== Appearances ==
=== In Naruto ===
Madara is mentioned in the second part of the manga Naruto but does not appear in most of the series except the war arc. During his childhood, he met a child named Hashirama, but amidst the conflicts of their respective clans resulting in war, their friendship ends. After failing at several attempts to kill or defeat his rival, Madara became friends with him and accepted his treaty offering peace between the two clans. The Uchiha, Senju and all of their affiliated clans came together to form a village, which Madara named Konohagakure. Madara took a merciless approach and did not like Hashirama's compassionate methods. After the death of his brother, Izuna, Madara became cynical and vengeful and held a grudge against the Senju Clan for slaughtering his brothers in the War. After his defection from Konoha, he believed there is no real peace. Losing all of his family and conflicted over his own clanmates, he decided to free the world from its pains, by casting Infinite Tsukuyomi (無限月読, Mugen Tsukuyomi) upon the whole world so that there would be no war and no death. Madara is believed to have been killed by Hashirama's hand, but he survives and goes into hiding. He awakens the legendary Eye Technique Rinnegan using Hashirama's DNA. Before dying, Madara takes Obito as his agent and transplants his Rinnegan into Nagato to be preserved for his eventual revival years later. After Madara's death, his greatest lasting influence was on Obito, who used Madara's knowledge to strongly influence and control the Akatsuki behind the scenes, and pretended to be Madara for much of the manga's story. When Obito moves into the final stages of Madara's goal by initiating the Fourth Shinobi World War, Kabuto Yakushi forms an alliance with him, eventually reviving Madara's reanimated corpse.

By nightfall, Madara releases himself from Kabuto's contract and rebounds his soul to the modified immortal body enabling him to act on his own will. Madara decides to reclaim the Nine-Tails creature sealed within Naruto and defeats the Kages, only to reunite with Obito while he is engaged in combat with the shinobis. Madara fully resurrects himself by sacrificing the defeated Obito, ordering Black Zetsu to take control over Obito's body and perform the Samsara of Heavenly Life Technique. Restored to life, Madara unlocks his full potential and manages to break free of his restraints. Defeating his enemies, Madara goes after the Tailed beasts to revive Ten-Tails. Madara is then confronted by Might Guy, Minato Namikaze, Gaara, and Rock Lee who each use all of their forces to kill him but fail. Before killing most of his enemies, Madara is confronted by the healed Naruto Uzumaki and Sasuke Uchiha who overwhelm him. Madara is forced to escape and regain Obito's Rinnegan. Upon returning to the field, Madara succeeds in casting the Infinite Tsukuyomi. The entire world becomes trapped in the dream. Sasuke saves Naruto, Kakashi, and Sakura from this Illusionary Technique, and Black Zetsu stabs Madara, gaining control over his body. Black Zetsu reveals that it was never Madara's will but Kaguya's Madara swells in size, Kaguya taking his place. Naruto, Sasuke, Sakura, and Kakashi seal Kaguya, who reverts into Ten Tails before being sealed spitting out Madara. Eventually, Madara dies because of the toll of the tailed beasts and the Demonic Statue removed from his body. In his final moments, Madara finds real peace in one final talk with Hashirama, stating that his dream for peace has died while Hashirama's dream for peace lives on and will always keep living on as it is the better of the two. Before dying, he acknowledges their friendship and agrees with Hashirama that despite everything they are still friends in the end .

=== In other media ===
Madara appears in the original video animation Hashirama Senju vs. Madara Uchiha (2012); Obito narrates the origin of Konoha. In the beginning, ninja fought for their clans. The most powerful among them are two clans: the Senju led by Hashirama, and the Uchiha led by Madara. This was distributed as part of the Naruto Shippuden: Ultimate Ninja Storm Generations video game for the PlayStation 3 and Xbox 360. Although Obito impersonates Madara, the character made his debut in a video game in Naruto Shippuden: Ultimate Ninja Storm 3. His Ten-Tailed Beast Host incarnation also appears in Naruto Shippuden: Ultimate Ninja Storm 4. In The Last: Naruto the Movie (2014), Madara appears for a brief moment to be seen fighting with Hashirama They are depicted as the reincarnation of Indra and Ashura, which gradually leads to the final battle between Sasuke and Naruto. Madara also appears in the iOS and Android mobile game Naruto Shippuden: Ultimate Ninja Blazing. Apart from the Naruto games, the character also appears in the crossover fighting games J-Stars Victory VS and Jump Force as downloadable content.

Several merchandise items based on Madara have been released, including key chains, action figures, and many more items.

== Reception ==
Madara is a popular character from the Naruto series. He is featured in most of the powerful anime character lists from different anime reviewers. Comic Book Resources listed him third on their list of "25 Most Powerful Anime Villains", praising his strength. Comic Book Resources also featured him on their list of "10 Anime Characters Who Got Stronger After Coming Back From The Dead" and gave him the ninth spot. Comic Vine rated him 34th on their "Top 100 Anime Villains" list. TheGamer, a news website focused on video game journalism, however, ranks him at fifth on their list titled "Final Form: The 25 Strongest Anime Villains Ever, Officially Ranked". Madara is also sixth on Screen Rant's list titled "20 Most Powerful Naruto Characters, Ranked"; author Bobby Anhalt writes that, "Madara Uchiha is a force to be taken seriously." UK Anime Network felt Madara's introduction was one of the franchise's strongest developments not only for the direction he took fight scenes but because of his effect on the main storyline. His next battle against the five Kages, the leaders of each ninja village, also earned acclaim for its execution, making the final story arc more appealing. UK Anime's reviewer also liked Naruto's fight against Obito which began in the same narrative. The Fandom Post praised this fight, noted how each Kage tries to defeat Madara on their own, but he is overwhelming does not care about his rivals. Siliconera enjoyed Madara's moves from the video game Storm 4 based on his Susanoo technique which was appealing to see in combat. Anime News Network author Amy McNulty, in her review of episode 392 from the anime, writes that Madara has been built up as the ultimate villain for Naruto, and he is living up to that promise. Jason Thompson, also writing for Anime News Network criticized the character calling Madara a "jerk"; but he liked his perfect Sussano'o, which to him looks cooler than the others and is much more powerful.

Madara's origins received a good response. Screen Rant, in their article "15 Things You Didn't Know About Madara", pointed out that the power that Madara sought eventually took over his innocence that was once a part of him. They also praised some of his good qualities including his ideas about gender, money, and power. While describing his love for his brother Izuna, they compared it with Itachi's for Sasuke. According to Screen Rant, Madara is "one of the best evil characters in the series". When first seeing Madara's past, The Fandom Post enjoyed the chaos between the Uchiha and Senju clans. Despite fighting through wars, Madara still showed humanity to the point the reviewer hoped for a spin-off based on the war. In its next review, The Fandom Post enjoyed how his relationship with Hashirama was handled. When Hashirama tried offering him peace it gave the series more of a back story as it focused on the characters' past and the founding of the Hidden Leaf village. Another reviewer from the same site noted that these backstories also helped fans understand the chaos that occurred within the Uchiha clan, which was previously explored in the stories of Sasuke and Itachi. Sasuke needed to resolve whether or not to team up with Madara and destroy the ninja world, leading to his decision to stick with Itachi's ideals instead.

Some critics disliked the handling of the character. In an article from Screen Rant, titled "15 Things Wrong With Naruto We All Choose To Ignore", author Daniel Forster criticized Black Zetsu's betrayal to Madara saying he found Kaguya a poor substitute for Madara who was noted for coming across as a well-developed antagonist. Anime News Network's Amy McNulty, however, thought that this was not that annoying, but she was unsure if it was a smart decision by Kishimoto to have Zetsu stab Madara, who was a genius and who believed Zetsu was "his will incarnate". Comic Book Resources author Renaldo Matadeen criticized the handling of Madara as a villain despite appearing late in the story, and found his characterization weak. While agreeing that Kaguya should not have replaced Madara as the final villain for the Shinobi War, Anime UK News felt that Kaguya was more fleshed out in the anime adaptation making her unique in terms of origins compared with Madara's past. Her descendants had a closer relationship with the protagonists, Naruto and Sasuke. Tejal Suhas Bagwe from Dissertation Submitted in Partial Fulfillment for the Degree of Masters of Arts in English describes the usage of god themed techniques within the Uchihas as major references to Japanese mythology especially when awakening the stronger Mangekyo Sharingan. Another reference is how Orochimaru becomes the mythical Yamata-no-Orochi during Sasuke's fight against Itachi who seals Orochimaru through his own Susanoo similar to the myth. The series' final antagonist, Kaguya Otsutsuki, is based on Kaguya Hime. Similar to the references of the Sharingans, Kaguya also references Japanese mythology, with both Sasuke and Naruto being the descendants of her children in a similar fashion to Amaterasu, the powerful Goddess of the Sun, and Susanoo, the God of thunder. The contrasting relations between these two characters is a common theme within the manga, as not only this is explored through Naruto and Sasuke but also through the two other connected ninjas, Hashirama Senju and Madara Uchiha.

== See also ==
- List of Naruto characters
