= The Last: Naruto the Movie =

2014 Japanese animated film directed by Tsuneo Kobayashi

- Japanese film poster
- Directed by: Tsuneo Kobayashi
- Screenplay by: Maruo Kyozuka
- Story by: Masashi Kishimoto; Maruo Kyozuka
- Based on: Naruto by Masashi Kishimoto
- Produced by: Takuyuki Hirobe; Naoji Hohnokidani; Shoji Matsui
- Starring: Junko Takeuchi; Nana Mizuki; Chie Nakamura; Showtaro Morikubo; Satoshi Hino; Kazuhiko Inoue; Noriaki Sugiyama
- Cinematography: Atsuho Matsumoto
- Edited by: Seiji Morita
- Music by: Yasuharu Takanashi; Yaiba
- Production company: Studio Pierrot
- Distributed by: Toho
- Release date: 6 December 2014
- Running time: 112 minutes
- Country: Japan
- Language: Japanese
- Budget: ¥120 million
- Box office: ¥2.0 billion (US$19.84 million)

The Last: Naruto the Movie is a 2014 Japanese animated martial arts romantic fantasy action-adventure film produced by Studio Pierrot and directed by Tsuneo Kobayashi. It is the tenth film based on Masashi Kishimoto's manga and anime Naruto. It stars Junko Takeuchi, Nana Mizuki, Chie Nakamura, Showtaro Morikubo, Satoshi Hino, Kazuhiko Inoue and Noriaki Sugiyama. Set after the episode 493 of the Naruto Shippuden anime series, the film focuses on the now adults Naruto Uzumaki's ninja team as they go on a mission to stop the moon from falling, and rescue Hanabi Hyuga — Hinata Hyuga's sister — from Toneri Otsutsuki, a man who wishes to marry Hinata and punish mankind for weaponising chakra.

The film premiered on 6 December 2014. Kishimoto created new designs for the characters, since they are now young adults rather than teenagers as depicted in Naruto: Shippuden. Kishimoto and the writers focused on the romantic relationship between the main characters; although Kishimoto was uncomfortable depicting romantic scenes, he enjoyed seeing the output. The film's theme song is Sukima Switch's "Hoshi no Utsuwa".

The Last had been the franchise's highest-grossing film before it was surpassed by its sequel, Boruto: Naruto the Movie (2015). The film was also a critical success, with a number of writers praising its story, for its focus on Naruto and Hinata's relationship, animation and superbly-animated action sequences. However, its lack of an appealing antagonist was criticised. The film's Japanese home-media release was one of the year's best sellers.

== Plot ==
Two years since the peace established in the aftermath of the Fourth Shinobi World War and Naruto Uzumaki and Sasuke Uchiha's final showdown in the Valley of the End, and Naruto has become a hero to the entire Shinobi World. However, the Sixth Hokage Kakashi Hatake notices that the moon is nearing Earth and will soon collide with it, which would lead to the end of all life on Earth. The crisis is caused by Toneri Otsutsuki, a descendant of the Sage of Six Paths's twin brother Hamura Otsutsuki, who is determined to fulfill Hamura's promise to judge humanity for their millennium-long perversion of the Sage's teachings into ninjutsu. During the Rinne Festival, Hinata Hyuga knits a red scarf similar to the one Naruto wore when they first met with Sakura Haruno offering her assistance, who encourages Hinata to tell Naruto how she feels about him, so that they can be together. Hinata finishes the scarf and tries to confess her love to Naruto, but she becomes doubtful when she see that Naruto has been receiving a variety of gifts from many other girls, including another scarf, which he clearly cherished and started wearing all the time. This breaks Hinata's heart, because she thought that Naruto has already fallen in love with someone else. But before she can ask him about it, Toneri infiltrates the Hidden Leaf to abduct Hinata, but Naruto's intervention forces him to instead kidnap her younger sister Hanabi.

Kakashi assigns Naruto, Hinata, Sakura, Sai and Shikamaru Nara to rescue Hanabi. In an abandoned village of the Otsutsuki Clan, Naruto understands the concept of romantic love from seeing Hinata's memories while being caught in an illusion and spending more time with her, after learning that Hinata is truly in love with him, and eventually realizing that he has feelings for her as well. The Hyuga Clan revealed to be descended from Hamura's kin who remained on Earth, Toneri had transplanted Hanabi's eyes into himself so he can acquire the Tenseigan (転生眼; lit. "Reincarnation Eye") created from his ancestors' sealed eyes while proposing to Hinata. Hinata reluctantly accepts the offer in order to save Hanabi, as well as to find and destroy the real 'Tenseigan' and save the earth. However, this breaks Naruto's heart in the process as she leaves with Toneri. The villagers on Earth defend themselves, intercepting the moon's meteorites and evacuating civilians while Sasuke returns to aid in protecting the Leaf Village.

After recovering for three days Naruto awakens but is sad and upset about Hinata's decision. Sakura reassures Naruto about Hinata's true intentions and must have had another reason for going with Toneri, helping him realize that Hinata loves him so much to ever forget about him, and the group approaches Toneri's castle. Hamura's spirit contacted Hinata, asking for her help as the Byakugan Princess as Toneri has misinterpreted his decree. Toneri refuses to listen to Hinata, ruins the scarf she was knitting for Naruto, and brainwashes her. Invading Toneri's castle, Sakura and Sai secure Hanabi while Shikamaru holds off Toneri's puppets, allowing Naruto to save Hinata. The two of them then successfully destroy the Tenseigan, which shuts down all of the puppets and stops the moon from approaching the earth. However, the moon eventually continues its approach when Toneri fully awakens a new Tenseigan using Hanabi's eyes. Naruto and Toneri then face each other in an epic final battle on the moon, during which Toneri splits the moon in half. However, Naruto gains the upper hand and defeats him with a single punch, which causes the Tenseigan to fade away and lose all of its power. Hinata then takes back Hanabi's eyes, which causes the moon to return to its orbit. Toneri tries to launch a final desperate attack at Naruto using the Byakugan used for the original Tenseigan, but he loses control of the eyes, which causes him to almost die. However, Naruto spares Toneri and, after which he and his friends show Toneri his ancestor's graves. Having seen the proof that he had misinterpreted Hamura's decree, he then decides to remain on the moon to atone for his sins. Later on, Naruto tells Hinata that the scarf he wore earlier was a gift from his late mother, Kushina Uzumaki, which causes Hinata to feel embarrassed for thinking it was from one of his fans. The two of them then declare their love for each other and share their first kiss once they return from the full moon.

The credits show a montage of Naruto and Hinata's wedding, with many of their friends and family attending and congratulating them. In a post-credits scene, Naruto and Hinata are happily married and living together with their two children; their son Boruto, and their daughter Himawari.

== Voice cast ==
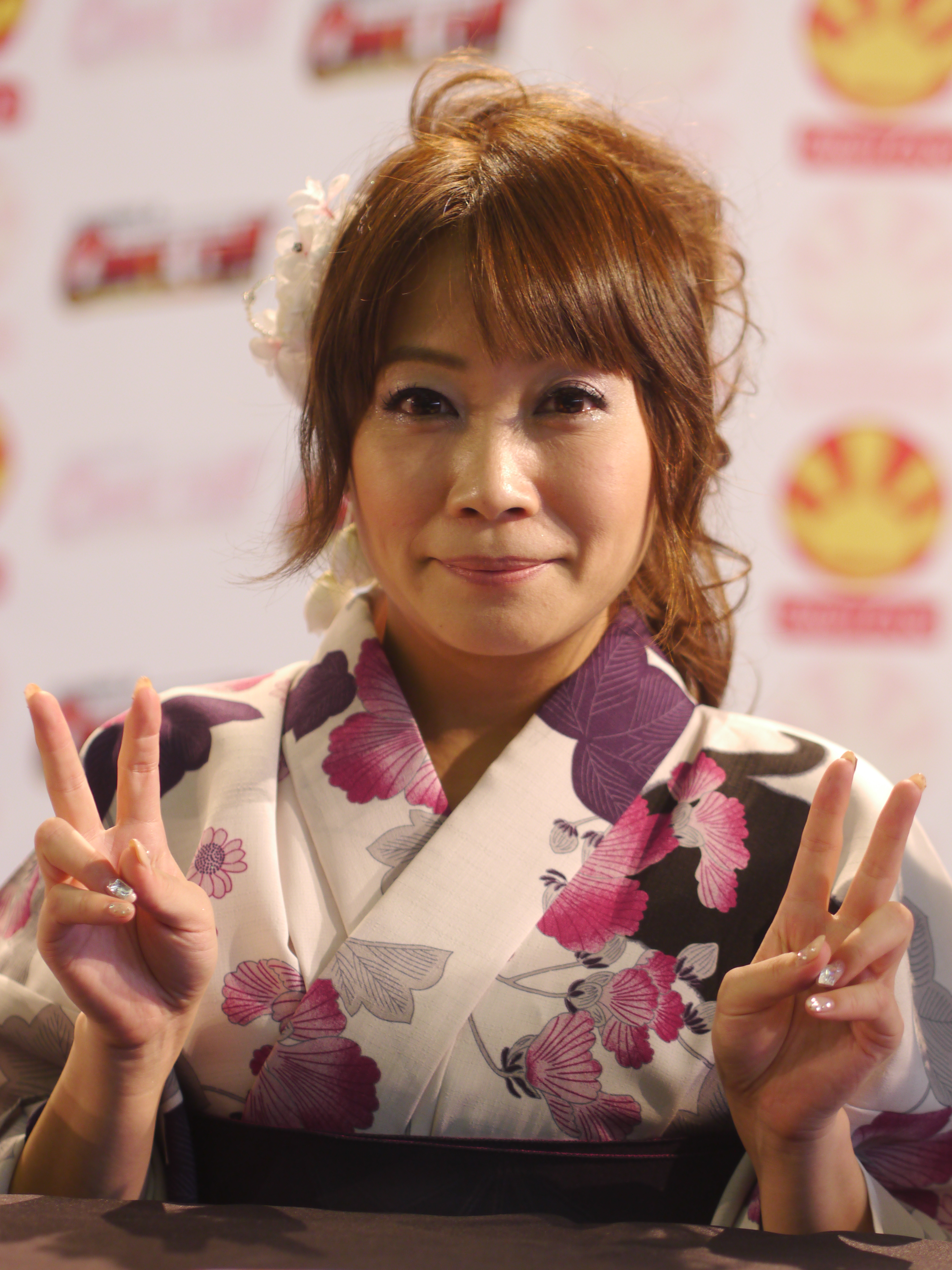
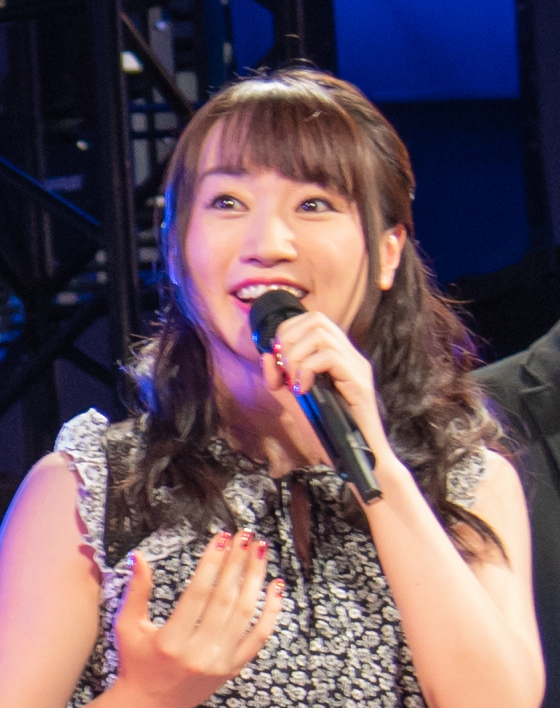
Junko Takeuchi and Nana Mizuki, the Japanese actresses who voiced Naruto Uzumaki and Hinata Hyuga, respectively

Character	Japanese	English
Naruto Uzumaki	Junko Takeuchi	Maile Flanagan
Hinata Hyuga	Nana Mizuki	Stephanie Sheh
Toneri Otsutsuki	Jun Fukuyama	Robbie Daymond
Sakura Haruno	Chie Nakamura	Kate Higgins
Shikamaru Nara	Showtaro Morikubo	Tom Gibis
Sai	Satoshi Hino	Ben Diskin
Sixth Hokage Kakashi Hatake	Kazuhiko Inoue	Dave Wittenberg
Hanabi Hyuga	Kiyomi Asai	Colleen Villard
Hiashi Hyuga	Eizō Tsuda	John DeMita
Kotetsu Hagane	Tomoyuki Kōno	Liam O'Brien
Izumo Kamizuki	Tomohiro Tsuboi	Richard Cansino
Konohamaru Sarutobi	Ikue Ōtani	Colleen Villard
Rock Lee	Yōichi Masukawa	Brian Donovan
Might Guy	Masashi Ebara	Skip Stellrecht
Ino Yamanaka	Ryōka Yuzuki	Colleen Villard
Choji Akimichi	Kentarō Itō	Robbie Rist
Fifth Hokage Tsunade	Masako Katsuki	Debi Mae West
Shizune	Keiko Nemoto	Megan Hollingshead
Iruka Umino	Toshihiko Seki	Quinton Flynn
Kurama	Tesshō Genda	Paul St. Peter
Fifth Kazekage Gaara	Akira Ishida	Liam O'Brien
Fourth Raikage A	Hideaki Tezuka	Beau Billingslea
Killer Bee	Hisao Egawa	Catero Colbert
Fifth Mizukage Mei Terumi	Yurika Hino	Mary Elizabeth McGlynn
Third Tsuchikage Onoki	Tomomichi Nishimura	Steven Blum
Sasuke Uchiha	Noriaki Sugiyama	Yuri Lowenthal
Akane	Riho Takada	Debi Mae West
Kaede	Ai Hashizume	Megan Hollingshead
Teuchi	Eisuke Asakura	Patrick Seitz
Kiba Inuzuka	Kōsuke Toriumi	Kyle Hebert
Kurenai Yuhi	Rumi Ochiai	Mary Elizabeth McGlynn
Hayate Gekko	Nozomu Sasaki	Lex Lang
Pain	Kenyu Horiuchi	Troy Baker
Katsuyu	Mamiko Noto	Mary Elizabeth McGlynn
Boruto Uzumaki	Kokoro Kikuchi	Maile Flanagan
Himawari Uzumaki	Yūki Kuwahara	Stephanie Sheh

== Production ==
The romantic scenes between Naruto and Hinata appealed to both the original manga author Masashi Kishimoto and animator Chengxi Huang due to the development of their relationship.

The film was directed by Tsuneo Kobayashi. Masashi Kishimoto provided the story concept, character designs and complete editorial supervision. Since the story takes place two years after Part II and several years before the epilogue, the characters were redesigned with clothing suitable for missions and more-mature facial features. The film contains homages to Jun'ichirō Tanizaki's In Praise of Shadows, Vincent van Gogh's The Starry Night, Alfred Hitchcock’s Vertigo (1958), and Nobuhiko Obayashi's Lonely Heart (1985). A new character, Toneri (voiced by Jun Fukuyama), appeared in the film. Screenwriter Maruo Kyozuka said that he wanted to depict a love triangle between Naruto, Hinata and Toneri in the film. Although Naruto is initially clueless about Hinata's feelings for him, during the film he begins to acknowledge and respond to them. Hinata's character was also developed in the film, with Kyozuka saying that she had to put aside her feelings for Naruto to accept Toneri's proposal so she could find Hanabi. During this scene, Kyozuka wanted to depict Naruto at his lowest after his rejection by Hinata. He then returned Naruto to his brave self, with the character resolving to continue his mission regardless of the cost. Toneri was developed as a despicable villain.

Sketches of Naruto, Hinata and Toneri by Masashi Kishimoto

After seeing the staff's initial work on a film about Naruto's relationship with Hinata, Kishimoto decided to oversee the project. Naruto was given a young adult appearance. His hair was made shorter, while his height was expanded notably in contrast to his Part II design. He was given two different outfits, a casual look consisting of an orange shirt as well as a design consisting of a black shirt with orange pants specifically meant for his missions. To make Hinata look like an adult woman, Kishimoto designed her with a strong image in mind. However, drawing Hinata with a pretty and feminine face was difficult, so he largely left the task to Tetsuya Nishio, who was in charge of aiding the author with the character designs. Also, he conceptualized her with a fixed design behind her waist so that her pouch would not get in the way. Different from always being embarrassed in front of Naruto, Hinata wore a languorous expression, which is characteristic of a woman that is deeply in love.

Kishimoto enjoyed seeing Naruto and Hinata's romantic scenes, even those not written by him. Kishimoto acknowledged his discomfort at writing romantic scenes, and he admitted he was not sure if he would be able to look at the scene depicting Naruto and Hinata's kiss. However, upon watching the scene, he felt a mixture of satisfaction and sadness due to the two characters' growth since Naruto's beginning; they had become like his own children. In making The Last: Naruto the Movie, Kishimoto based the idea of Hinata wanting to make a scarf for Naruto on what his wife had actually once done for him; this elicited laughs from the staff as they worked on the film. Animator Chengxi Huang, who had been working on multiple episodes of Naruto Shippuden beginning in early 2014, thanked Kishimoto for being a part of the animation team of The Last, as he had wanted Naruto and Hinata to become a couple since Part I of the manga, and thus enjoyed working on this film.

Hinata's Japanese voice actress, Nana Mizuki, was surprised at the attention her character received. After seeing Hinata as an adult, Mizuki was amazed by how womanly Hinata looked and acted, feeling the same way about Naruto's young-adult self. The character's personality and unwillingness to give up, regardless of the situation, attracted Mizuki to Hinata. According to Mizuki, her favourite scene in the film was when Naruto tells Hinata he loves her. While being happy at Hinata's joy, she thought the character behaved rather coldly when Hinata went to Toneri. Naruto's Japanese voice actress, Junko Takeuchi, was happy with the story and had hoped that Naruto would end up in a relationship with Hinata. Takeuchi was reminded of Naruto's late godfather, Jiraiya, when she read the script. She thought that although Naruto's declaration of love was the most important part of the character's growth, his true nature had not changed at that point. Satisfied with the story, Takeuchi thought that the audience would agree with her view.

== Music ==
The jazz fusion duo Sukima Switch performed the film's theme song, "Hoshi no Utsuwa" ("Star Vessel"), after producer Takuyuki Hirobe had asked them to compose a song which invoked a gentle (yet powerful) world view. The single was released on 3 December 2014, at the same time as the film's soundtrack. A character CD song for Hinata, "Fuyu no Owari ni (冬の終わりに)" ("At the End of Winter"), was recorded by Nana Mizuki. Two additional CDs were Even in a Future Day and The Host: Naruto the CD.

== Reception ==
=== Critical response ===
The film's romantic outlook has been well received by writers. Amy McNulty of Anime News Network praised the film's more character-driven, romantic approach compared to the previous films: "Despite the (awkward) title, the movie is not actually the final film in the franchise, but it's the last of an era and a fitting capstone for the series and its fandom". David West of Neo wrote that although The Last had characteristics in common with the original series (such as the main characters' mission to stop Toneri's plans), its well-executed focus on the romantic relationship was fairly new to the franchise. According to a Toon Zone review, the film's early release (before the end of the Naruto: Shippuden anime) and new status quo in the Naruto world might confuse the audience.

Naruto's romance with Hinata has been mostly praised by the media, with some reviewers saying that The Last should have been condensed for their relationship to have a bigger part. David West said their relationship was well-executed, praising the inclusion of previous occasions in the series where Hinata and Naruto were together. West also praised Hinata's role in the film and her interaction with the antagonist, Toneri. While noting issues with some plot elements, Thais Valdivia enjoyed the symbolism of the scarves. Midwest Book Review commended the main cast's character development and relationship to the point of stating that anime fans in general might enjoy the feature. However, Brendan Ha had mixed initial emotions about the romance. According to Ha, it was affecting, but the fact that this was Naruto's last film (since the next one focused on his son) left viewers unhappy.

Journalists have applauded the film's animation, action scenes and overall atmosphere. Charles Solomon of the Los Angeles Times gave the film a positive review: "If 'The Last' lacks some of the emotional punch of the previous feature, 'The Road to Ninja', Kobayashi compensates with flamboyant visuals that mix CG, drawn animation and elegant calligraphic figures; fans should stay through the credits for a surprising final scene". Amy McNulty commended the film's animation but criticised the falling-moon threat's lack of impact on the story. Fandom Post writer Chris Beveridge agreed about the falling-moon, but he praised The Last's atmosphere and lack of melodrama. Brendan Ha of Otaku USA enjoyed the film's action scenes and animation. Thais Valdivia of Hobby Consolas liked the development of the supporting characters Shikamaru Nara and Sai, but she criticised the too-brief appearance of Sasuke Uchiha.

Reviewers have generally criticised Toneri's role as the film's antagonist. Kotaku's Richard Eisenbeis enjoyed the supporting cast as well as the love story and recommended the film to long-time Naruto fans, but he regarded Toneri as an unmemorable villain. Besides criticising the film's overarching plot and nondescript score, Amy McNulty described Toneri as an unengaging antagonist. A Toon Zone reviewer wrote that the villain was overshadowed by the relationship between Naruto and Hinata, which made the film more appealing.

=== Release and box office ===
The Last was first announced at Jump Festa 2012. The film's first trailer premiered on 31 July 2014. It was promoted in the lead-up to the Naruto manga finale in Weekly Shōnen Jump, with information announced weekly. The film premiere took place on 6 December 2014. A limited-edition data book with Kishimoto's one-shot tie-in chapter was distributed with the film. Maruo Kyōzuka wrote a novelisation, which was published by Shueisha on 8 December 2014.

During its first weekend, The Last earned ¥515 million (US$4.35 million) and grossed ¥1.29 billion after three weekends. In December 2014, it earned about ¥1.75 billion ($14.76 million) and became the franchise's top-grossing feature film. By January 2016, the film had grossed ¥2 billion ($16.9 million).

Aniplex released the Japanese DVD on 22 July 2015, which sold 18,565 copies in that country. It was one of 2016's bestselling DVDs in Japan, selling 34,687 copies. On 29 December 2016, the film aired on TV Tokyo at 1:30 a.m. and received a rating of 1.4 percent.

It was released by Madman Entertainment in Australia and New Zealand. In North America, Viz Media and Eleven Arts screened the film in 21 theatres on 20 February 2015. Viz released the DVD and Blu-ray versions on 6 October 2015.

=== Legacy ===
In Charapedia polls, Naruto's love confession towards Hinata remained as one of the most popular ones. After The Last's post-credits scene, a trailer for the next film has been shown, featuring Naruto and Hinata's son — Boruto Uzumaki, Sasuke and Sakura's daughter — Sarada Uchiha, and the rest of the new generation. For its fighting game Naruto Shippuden: Ultimate Ninja Storm 4, CyberConnect2 added Naruto, Sasuke, Sakura, and Hinata in their forms from The Last to the game's playable characters. Shō Hinata wrote a light novel, Konoha Hiden: The Perfect Day for a Wedding (2015), which was later adapted into the Naruto anime's final season, in which Kakashi tasks the cast with finding the best gift for Naruto and Hinata's wedding. Toneri returns in the anime series Boruto: Naruto Next Generations, and he is interested in Boruto's growth.
