= Hinata Hyuga =

Naruto franchise fictional character

- Naruto character
- Hinata Hyuga's design in Part I
- First appearance: Naruto chapter 34: Intruders? (2000)
- Created by: Masashi Kishimoto
- Voiced by: Japanese Nana Mizuki; English Stephanie Sheh

In-universe information
- Family: Hiashi Hyuga (father); Unnamed mother; Hanabi Hyuga (sister)
- Spouse: Naruto Uzumaki (husband)
- Children: Boruto Uzumaki (son); Himawari Uzumaki (daughter); Kawaki Uzumaki (adoptive son)
- Relatives: Unnamed paternal grandparents; Unnamed maternal grandparents; Hizashi Hyuga (uncle, deceased); Neji Hyuga (cousin, deceased); Unnamed paternal grandparents-in-law; Unnamed maternal grandparents-in-law; Kushina Uzumaki (mother-in-law, deceased); Minato Namikaze (father-in-law, deceased)
- Ninja rank: Genin in Part I; Chunin in Part II
- Ninja team: Team 8/Kurenai Yūhi

Hinata Hyuga (Japanese: 日向 ヒナタ, Hepburn: Hyūga Hinata) is a fictional character in the anime and manga Naruto, created by Masashi Kishimoto. Hinata is a beautiful kunoichi and the former heiress of the Hyūga clan from the fictional village of Konoha. She is also a member of Team Kurenai, which consists of herself, Kiba Inuzuka with his ninja dog — Akamaru, Shino Aburame, and team leader Kurenai Yuhi. At the start of the series, Hinata has strong admiration toward the main protagonist — Naruto Uzumaki, which eventually turns into real love as the story progresses. Hinata has appeared several times in the series' feature films, most notably The Last: Naruto the Movie (2014), which revolves around her relationship with Naruto. She has also been present in other media related to the franchise, including video games, original video animations, and the manga and anime sequel Boruto: Naruto Next Generations (2016), in which she has become the mother of Naruto's three children (two biological, one adopted) and is now named Hinata Uzumaki (うずまき ヒナタ, Uzumaki Hinata).

In the making of the series, Kishimoto had decided Hinata would marry him; however, the plot regarding their romance was conceived by screenwriter Maruo Kyozuka. Hinata's design has been modified by Kishimoto throughout the franchise's story in order to fit the character's growth. She is voiced by Nana Mizuki in the original animated series and Stephanie Sheh in the English adaptations. Critical reception to the character has been mostly positive due to her actions in the series and her bigger role in The Last — her interactions with Naruto and her engagement in a conflict with the film's villain have been praised. Hinata has also been popular with the Naruto reader base, placing high in some polls. Merchandise based on Hinata have been released, including action figures, key chains and figurines and plushies.

== Creation and conception ==
Hinata Hyuga's design in Part I (right), Part II (middle), and young adult (left), depicted in The Last: Naruto the Movie

In creating Hinata Hyuga, Masashi Kishimoto originally designed a sketch which was shown to one of his assistants. In this sketch, Hinata was not a ninja and instead wore a fashion dress. Kishimoto remarked he had created this design for fun, emphasizing that he wanted Hinata to have a different personality. Nonetheless, the final design changed drastically, with Hinata becoming a ninja and a modern girl at the same time.

In 2017, Kishimoto said in an interview that he had decided on Naruto Uzumaki and Hinata getting married from the early stages of the manga. He felt that their relationship was meant to be as Hinata had been supportive of Naruto since the beginning, even before Iruka Umino; however, this angered his wife, who wanted Naruto to end up with Sakura Haruno instead. As the character's popularity was increasing, Kishimoto decided that Hinata would have a bigger role in the final arc. As a result, he conceived the idea of killing Hinata's cousin, Neji Hyuga, in order for her to offer support to Naruto while being protected by Neji before his death. Animator Chengxi Huang behind multiple Naruto series took a liking to this couple ever since he started working in Naruto Shippuden, often aiming to draw scenes of the two and most notably a scene from the final arc when Hinata slaps Naruto to calm him following the death of Neji Hyuga. In the making of the film, he thanked Kishimoto for accepting to do The Last where the couple was explored furthermore. He later created a video which showed a nude Hinata and Naruto in bed together, posted to his work Instagram, but removed it after the video received fan backlash for being inappropriate for the demographic.

In the film The Last: Naruto the Movie (2014), Hinata knits a red scarf for Naruto. This was based on how Kishimoto's wife had actually once done for him, which brought laughs to the staff while developing the film. Screenwriter Maruo Kyozuka said he wanted to depict a love triangle between Naruto, Hinata, and Toneri Otsutsuki in The Last. Hinata's character was also developed in the film, with Kyozuka saying that she had to put aside her feelings for Naruto to accept Toneri's proposal so that she could rescue Hanabi Hyuga, her sister. Kishimoto felt embarrassment when it came to the romance in the film, stating that he was not sure if he would be able to look at the scene depicting Naruto and Hinata's kiss. Nevertheless, he felt a combination of satisfaction and sadness due to the couple's development, stating that he considered them his children.

For the series' Part II, Hinata was designed to look like a woman who is beautiful but avoids using make-up and is more focused on fighting. Hinata's appearance was altered when she became a young adult. The clothing she wore varied from girlish clothing to clothing that brought about an adult atmosphere. The character viewed being able to move her feet as important, so she wore clothes with low heels. To make her more like an adult woman, Kishimoto designed her with a strong image in mind. However, drawing Hinata with a pretty and feminine face was difficult, so he largely left the task to Tetsuya Nishio, who was in charge of aiding the author with the character designs. Also, he conceptualized her with a fixed design behind her waist so that her pouch would not get in the way. Different from always being embarrassed in front of Naruto, Hinata wore a languorous expression, which is characteristic of a woman that is deeply in love.

For the film Boruto: Naruto the Movie (2015) and the following projects, Hinata was further redesigned. Kishimoto made her hair shorter since it had become a hindrance for her due to her interactions with her growing children. Her clothes were created in order to fit her growth as a mature woman and mother while still retaining the fashion she likes.

=== Voice actresses ===
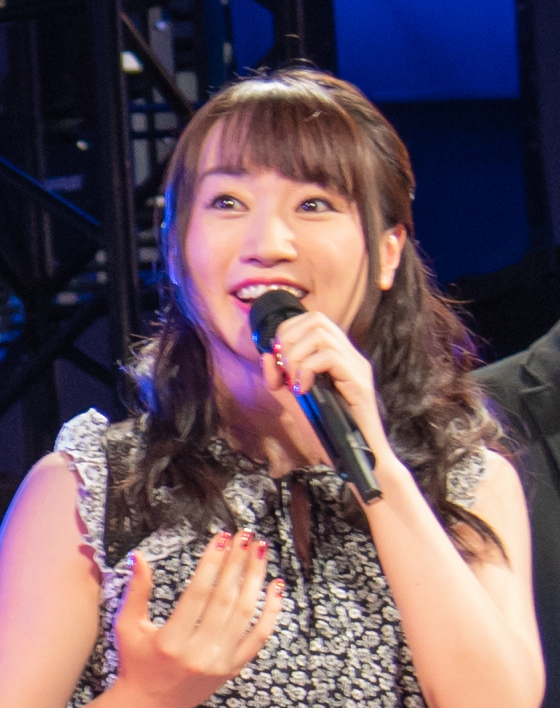
Hinata has been voiced by Nana Mizuki in Japanese

Nana Mizuki, Hinata's Japanese voice actress, was surprised by the focus her character received. After seeing Hinata as a young adult, Mizuki commented that she was amazed by how womanly and mature Hinata had become. She expressed similar feelings regarding Hinata's interactions with Naruto's young adult self. The character's attributes such as her personality and her unwillingness to give up regardless of the situation were what made Mizuki like Hinata. Her favorite scene in the film was Naruto's love confession to Hinata. Mizuki was happy for what this meant to her character, but she did not enjoy the moment when Hinata took Toneri's side.

Stephanie Sheh, Hinata's English voice actress, originally auditioned for both Hinata and Sakura Haruno. She felt pleasure when she received Hinata's role as she found her relatable due to her self-esteem issues. She stated that she wanted her character to end up with Naruto due to her feelings for him.

== Appearances ==
=== In Naruto ===
Hinata, the eldest of Hiashi Hyuga's two children, is raised as the heiress to Hyuga clan's main household due to Hiashi being the elder between him and his twin brother, Hizashi, and thereby making Hiashi head of the clan while Hizashi is demoted to the Branch House whose only purpose is to serve the upper branch. Hinata is nearly kidnapped at a young age, though saved by her father; this serves as the catalyst of the Hyuga Affair, which ends with Hizashi willingly taking the place of Hiashi to compensate for the death of the head ninja who tried to kidnap Hinata so that a breach in the treaty between the Hyuga clan's village of Konohagakure and Kumogakure is prevented. Growing up, Hinata is trained by Hiashi, but he begins to have doubts about her ability to lead the clan after seeing her struggles during their sessions. As a result, he apparently disowns her, having her younger sister, Hanabi Hyuga, as the heiress. Hinata also meets Naruto Uzumaki during her youth, developing an interest in him after he defends her while she is being bullied because of her eyes. That event and Naruto's refusal to give up against adversity inspire Hinata to become a stronger person. However, Hinata's admiration for Naruto gradually turns into romantic feelings.

Hinata is introduced in Part I of the Naruto manga during the Chunin Exams, a series of tests that are meant to upgrade her status as a rookie, along with her teammates — Kiba Inuzuka and Shino Aburame. She reaches the third examination, where she is forced to fight her cousin, Neji Hyuga. Despite her fears, Naruto encourages her to battle him. She is nearly killed in combat, and Naruto decides to avenge her. At the end of Part I, after Naruto leaves to be trained by Jiraiya, Hinata vows to become a stronger person. In Part II, two-and-a-half years after the events of Part I, Hinata has been promoted to Chunin and reunites with Naruto, fainting at seeing him for the first time in years. Hinata and her team aid Team Kakashi on a collaborative mission to find both Naruto's rival and former teammate Sasuke Uchiha and his older brother, Itachi Uchiha, though the mission is ultimately a failure. After the Akatsuki terrorist leader, Pain, attacks Konohagakure and overwhelms Naruto in combat, Hinata attempts to save the latter while finally admitting her feelings for him. Though, impaled by Pain as means to force Naruto to see the world from his perspective, Hinata survives and her injuries are healed soon afterward by Sakura Haruno. When the Fourth Great Ninja War begins, Hinata is placed in the same division as Neji, and she joins Naruto in the battle against the Ten-Tails after her cousin sacrifices himself to protect them. She manages to defeat the clone of the Ten-Tails but later gets caught in the Infinite Tsukuyomi, imagining a relationship with Naruto before being released. After Naruto is able to defeat and reform Sasuke, Hinata and everyone else are released from the Infinite Tsukuyomi. She later attends Neji's funeral alongside Naruto and the rest of the Konohagakure shinobi. In the following years, Hinata and Naruto marry and have two children, a son named Boruto Uzumaki, and a daughter named Himawari Uzumaki.

=== In The Last: Naruto the Movie ===
Hinata's Byakugan

The events of The Last: Naruto the Movie take place two years after the Fourth Great Ninja War in the series' Part II. At the age of 19, Hinata hopes to give Naruto a red scarf she knitted herself as a gift of love (which is reminiscent of the scarf he wore when they met as children, which was torn apart by bullies he was defending her from). But she becomes doubtful he'll accept it when he receives a wide variety of gifts from other women due to his newfound popularity and begins wearing a blue scarf he recently found. Soon after this, Toneri Otsutsuki infiltrates Konohagakure and kidnaps Hinata's sister, Hanabi, in order to use her Byakugan (白眼; lit. "White Eye", English manga: "Evil Eye"/"All-Seeing Eye") as his new eyes. Hinata joins Team Kakashi and Shikamaru Nara on the mission to save her sister.

During their journey through the abandoned Shinobi village of the Otsutsuki Clan, Naruto returns Hinata's feelings for him after he is caught in a genjutsu and relives some of her memories. Despite this, Hinata has been contacted by the spirit of her ancestor, Hamura Otsutsuki, to aid him as the "Byakugan Princess"; thus, she allows herself to be captured by Toneri under his belief that they will be getting married. In truth, it is so that she can destroy the Tenseigan (転生眼; lit. "Reincarnation Eye"). However, Toneri discovers the deception and mind-controls Hinata after destroying the scarf she originally created for Naruto. Naruto's team finally catches up, and a massive attack on Toneri's palace begins. The team splits, with Naruto disrupting the wedding ceremony just as Toneri was about to kiss Hinata, while the others secure Hanabi. Hinata carries out Hamura's will by helping Naruto destroy the Tenseigan and stop Toneri.

In spite of this, Toneri's Tenseigan chakra cloak grants him the power to slice the moon in half, placing Hinata in a giant bird cage. Naruto enters Nine-Tails Chakra Mode, and a huge duel ensues. Near the end, Naruto grasps the last remaining shred of Hinata's scarf and channels his chakra to deliver a punch strong enough to pin Toneri against the wall and depower him, stopping the moon from falling. Hinata takes Hanabi's eyes back from Toneri and returns them to her sister. Soon after, Hinata and Naruto reaffirm their mutual love and kiss for first time as they enter into a relationship that leads to their marriage and the start of their family.

=== In Boruto ===
In Boruto: Naruto the Movie, Hinata tries to make the best of Himawari's birthday by planning a party in Naruto's absence due to his new duties as Hokage. She then watches Boruto while he competes in the Chunin Exams, being approached by Naruto to use her Byakugan to confirm his suspicions that their son is cheating by using a particular ninja tool. After Momoshiki Otsutsuki and Kinshiki Otsutsuki attack and subsequently kidnap Naruto, Hinata tries to rescue him by chasing after them, only to be swept aside and wounded; she is then healed by Sakura. While Hinata is against Boruto joining Sasuke's rescue team, she eventually gives in. With Naruto then rescued, Hinata tends to the damage of Boruto's jacket before he declines.

=== In other media ===
Besides The Last: Naruto the Movie and Boruto: Naruto the Movie, Hinata appears in five other Naruto feature films; in Naruto Shippuden the Movie (2007), she and Shino briefly cross paths with Team 7; in Naruto Shippuden the Movie: Bonds (2008), Hinata, Naruto and Sakura are on a mission to escort Amaru and Shinno to their respective villages, with Hinata incorrectly confirming the death of Amaru and being captured along with the villagers, though later being freed by Amaru; in Naruto Shippuden the Movie: The Will of Fire (2009), she goes in search of Naruto and Sakura who are themselves looking for Kakashi Hatake, and she joins Neji in attacking the flying beast fusion of Ni, Ichi and San, afterward combining their attacks to destroy it; in Naruto the Movie: Blood Prison (2011), Hinata works in a team to bring Naruto back from the Blood Prison; in Road to Ninja: Naruto the Movie (2012), taking place prior to the Fourth Great Ninja War, Hinata fights off an attack from the Akatsuki while an alternate version of her, who wears less clothing and has more confidence and assertiveness, appears in the Genjutsu World created by Obito Uchiha, who has used the tailed beasts in his possession. A light novel titled Sakura Hiden: Thoughts of Love, Riding Upon a Spring Breeze (2015), written by Tomohito Ōsaki and illustrated by Kishimoto, details a date between Hinata and Naruto, the pair trying to save Sakura after her kidnapping by Kido Tsumiki but being too late to rescue her as Sakura has already saved herself.

== Reception ==
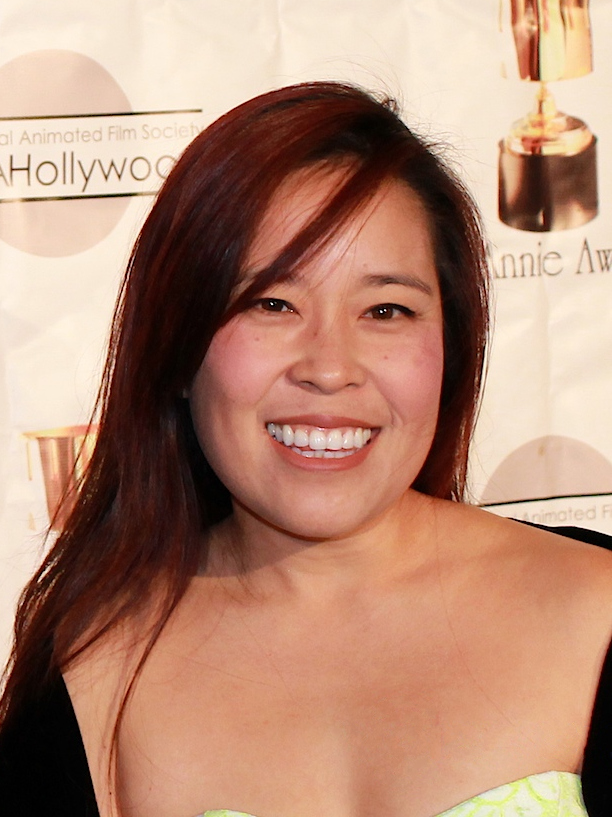
Stephanie Sheh, the English voice of Hinata, has received praise

Hinata is a popular character among Naruto fans, ranking tenth in the first annual character popularity poll, sixth in both the second and third, 12th in the fourth, ninth in the fifth, 13th in the sixth, and tenth in the seventh. Amy McNulty of Anime News Network complimented the voice work of Stephanie Sheh for "simultaneously conveying the character's shyness, anxiety and determination". Hinata merchandise has been released, including figurines. In a poll from 2021, Hinata was voted as the fourth most popular character in Boruto: Naruto Next Generations. In 2023, in the first global poll, Hinata was found to be the franchise's tenth most popular character overall, and the second most popular female character behind Sakura Haruno.

Reviewing one of the series' early story arcs, Carl Kimlinger of Anime News Network said that her fight stimulated her "determination to change" because of her weak personality. IGN's Charles White enjoyed Hinata's character arc in the first anime series, praising how she fought alone in order to save Naruto from the antagonist Jiga. During the series' final arc, Chris Beveridge of The Fandom Post liked the way Hinata supported Naruto and helped him to keep fighting against their enemies alongside her. Critic Yukari Fujimoto stated that Hinata, along with other female characters, prioritized love, treating it as more important than excelling as a ninja. After seeing her in the series' Part II for the first time, Jason Thompson enjoyed Hinata's design and expected that she and Naruto would form a couple in the future. For the finale, Ramsey Isler of IGN stated that while Hinata and Naruto ending up together was not a surprise, it nonetheless disappointed some fans who wanted Naruto to start a relationship with Sakura Haruno.

Critical reception to the development of Naruto and Hinata's relationship in The Last was generally positive. Charles Solomon of Los Angeles Times regarded their relation in the film as an "awkward romance", while Japanator.com wrote that Hinata's struggles with romance were part of the film's favorable aspects. McNulty said that, while the romance might have come off as awkward at first, it became much more appealing to the viewers as the film went on. Brendan Ha of Otaku USA felt that while many readers had known Hinata's feelings for Naruto ever since her early appearances in the series, Naruto's feelings for her had never been seen and thus The Last helped to show them. Ha praised the way Hinata tried to confess her love to Naruto, making the film "touching". Beveridge found the two characters' development appealing, but he also stated that he wished the film had been condensed in order to focus on the main couple only. UK Anime Network writer Dan Rhodes agreed with Beveridge, saying the main storyline's focus was Hinata and Naruto's relationship rather than the appearance of the film's villain, whom he considered forgettable. Chris Homer, another The Fandom Post writer, felt that Naruto fans had wanted to see this particular pair together for over fifteen years and stated the film "delivers"; he also praised the relationship between Hinata and Sakura as the latter tried to help Hinata confess her love to Naruto. David West of Neo said that Hinata and Naruto's relationship was well executed, and he praised the inclusion of previous events from the series in which the two characters were together. He also enjoyed Hinata's role in the film and what happened between her and the antagonist.

In March 2018, Chinese animator Chengxi Huang posted a video of Naruto and Hinata embracing each other naked in bed, to his public work Instagram. The video received fan backlash for being inappropriate for the demographic. Huang's apology stated that the animation was simply practice, and that he wanted to portray the everyday life of a married couple but still deleted the video in response.
