= Naruto Uzumaki =

Protagonist of the manga series Naruto

- Naruto character
- From left to right: Part I, Boruto franchise, and Part II designs by Masashi Kishimoto
- First appearance: Naruto chapter 1: Uzumaki Naruto! (1999)
- Created by: Masashi Kishimoto
- Voiced by: Japanese; Junko Takeuchi; English; Maile Flanagan
- Notable relatives: List: Minato Namikaze (father, deceased); Kushina Uzumaki (mother, deceased); Jiraiya (godfather, mentor, deceased); Hinata Uzumaki (wife); Boruto Uzumaki (son); Himawari Uzumaki (daughter); Kawaki Uzumaki (adopted son); Hanabi Hyuga (sister-in-law); Hiashi Hyuga (father-in-law)

Naruto Uzumaki (Japanese: うずまき ナルト, Hepburn: Uzumaki Naruto) (Note: The English manga published by VIZ Media uses the Japanese naming order, surname before given name, and so Naruto's name is Uzumaki Naruto in the English manga. Other English adaptations use the Western order, that is surname after given name.) (/ˈnɑːrutoʊ/) is the titular character and main protagonist of the manga series Naruto, created by Masashi Kishimoto. He is a ninja from the fictional Hidden Leaf Village (Japanese: 木ノ葉隠れ, Hepburn: Konohagakure). As a boy, Naruto is ridiculed and ostracized on account of the Kurama the Nine-Tailed Fox—a malevolent creature that attacked Hidden Leaf Village—that was sealed away in his body. Despite this, he aspires to become his village's leader, the Hokage, to receive their approval. His carefree, optimistic, and boisterous personality enables him to befriend other Hidden Leaf Village ninja, as well as ninja from other villages. Naruto appears in the series's films and in other media related to the franchise, including video games and original video animations (OVA), as well as the sequel Boruto series, where he is the Seventh Hokage, and his son, Boruto Uzumaki, is the titular character and main protagonist along with Kawaki, Naruto's adopted son.

When creating Naruto for the initial part of the series, Kishimoto kept the character "simple and stupid" while giving him many attributes of an ideal hero. Kishimoto gave Naruto a dark side by adding tragedy to the character's past. He has revised Naruto's image many times, providing the character with simple clothes to fit the young demography. Kishimoto changed his design for Part II of the storyline, which starts two-and-a-half years after Part I. Naruto is voiced by Junko Takeuchi in the original animated series and Maile Flanagan in the English adaptations.

Merchandise based on Naruto includes figurines and keychains. Naruto's character development has been praised by anime and manga publications and has drawn scholarly attention. Although some initially saw him as a typical manga and anime protagonist comparable to those in other shōnen manga, others have praised his personality and character development as he avoids stereotypes typically seen in similar media. The character has also been the subject of research in literature, making him stand out in fiction based on his traits and growth.

== Creation and conception ==
=== Original concept and influences ===
Original sketch for Naruto in Kishimoto's one-shot, Naruto (1997), which went through several alterations for the manga series due to its amount of detail

During the 1990s, new manga author Masashi Kishimoto sought to write a one-shot chapter that would feature Naruto as a chef, but this version never made it to print. Kishimoto originally wanted to make Naruto a child who could transform into a fox, so he created a one-shot of Naruto for the summer 1997 issue of Akamaru Jump magazine based on the idea. When comparing both the Naruto one-shot and his other work, Karakuri, Kishimoto realized that the former's title character was more appealing than the lead of Karakuri. Kishimoto reflects that Naruto's "honest" smile was well received in contrast to the sly look the main character from Karakuri had. Following the success of another one-shot, Mario, Kishimoto started working on the Naruto series, where he wanted to reuse the title character from his earlier one-shot. Kishimoto wrote the first two chapters to show his appeal to the readers and then focus on the other protagonists despite difficulties. Following the second chapter, Kishimoto introduced the other protagonists, but with bad relationships, including with Sasuke Uchiha and Naruto's constant rejected affections for Sakura Haruno. The manga story was planned to show Naruto's coming-of-age through multiple fights, and he looked forward to seeing the conclusion.

For the serialized version, Kishimoto incorporated traits he felt made an ideal hero in the creation of Naruto: a straightforward way of thinking, a mischievous side, and attributes possessed by Goku from the Dragon Ball franchise, aiming to keep Naruto "simple and stupid". Although Goku was a major influence to Naruto, Kishimoto was more attracted by Dragon Ball character Krillin, as he comes across as more human than the protagonist for displaying flaws that made the readers easier to accept in a similar fashion to his mentor Iruka Umino. Kishimoto avoided modeling him after anyone in particular, instead conceiving of him as naïve with a dark side resulting from his harsh past. Despite this, he is always optimistic, a trait Kishimoto said makes this character unique. By and large, Naruto's personality is childish; the creator tried to convey this trait in his illustrations. Kishimoto notes the cover of volume 10 as an example of this, where Kishimoto depicts Naruto mimicking a turtle as a child might do. Naruto was Kishimoto's first published manga, and he focused on making Naruto's facial expressions consistent in difficult situations. He commented, "It's rather awkward to talk about what makes Naruto appealing to audiences, but I think his being a knucklehead gives him an appeal". He believed it was Naruto's losses that made readers identify with him, although he wanted Naruto not to feel defeated again, which was his primary aim when writing the series. Kishimoto has said that Naruto's burning desire to be a ninja was based on his own ambition to succeed as a manga artist. As the series went on, Kishimoto wrote the older incarnations of Naruto to be naïve idealists due to how Naruto was written to continuously avoid repeating previous mistakes. However, at the same time, Kishimoto wrote him as a sign of hope, something important in regard to the series's audience.

In the original Japanese versions of Naruto, Naruto often ends his sentences with the addendum "-ttebayo" (which achieves an effect similar to ending a sentence with "you know?" in English). Kishimoto wanted to give Naruto a childlike catchphrase, and "dattebayo" came to mind; he believed that the phrase complemented Naruto's character and served as a verbal tic that portrayed him in a brattish manner. Throughout the first episodes of the English dub version, "dattebayo" and "-ttebayo" were replaced with the phrase "Believe it!", both to mirror the effect and to match the character's lip movements, although later in the English dub, Naruto stopped saying "Believe it!" and the phrase was replaced with "You know?".

=== Development ===
Naruto as a young adult. His red scarf, created by Hinata Hyuga, is a reference to Masashi Kishimoto's wife.

After fans likened Naruto, Sasuke, and Sakura to the three main characters from the Harry Potter fantasy books, Kishimoto noted that both trios began their careers in a classroom, though he added that the similarity was unintentional. During the series's publication, Kishimoto married and had children. This influenced how he viewed Naruto's character. Naruto met his parents and learned of their sacrifices to help him to control the Nine-Tailed Fox inside him so that he could protect their world. As a result, Naruto appreciated his life more and learned that his parents loved him, something the author wanted the character to feel based on his own experience as a father. In the first chapters of the series, Kishimoto did not conceive the idea that Naruto would be the son of Minato Namikaze. However, as time passed on, the manga author made touches to Minato's face shown in the Hokage Mountain in Konoha to make them more similar to Naruto with an emphasis on their spiky hairs. However, to reduce too many similarities, Kushina Uzumaki's character was made to look like Naruto's face.

Out of all the student-teacher relationships Kishimoto has created in the Naruto series, the one between Naruto and Jiraiya is his favorite. Right before Jiraiya's death in his fight against Pain in his last moments, he discovers the origin of Pain's multiple bodies and uses his last forces to send that message as a piece of advice to Naruto so that Naruto could defeat him in his place. This arc was the most difficult one to write; he felt this because Naruto truly forgave his enemy. Instead of having the protagonist kill the enemy he hates, as it happens in other series, Kishimoto found the idea of the two characters interacting and settling their differences more challenging. This had a major impact on the writer, and he decided to have Naruto forgive Sasuke during their final fight in a similar manner as he interacted with Nagato. Kishimoto felt the need to create a story arc that would emphasize the tragedy of wars, leading to the final arc, which would include a war. The principal reason for this was a significant difference between the two main characters, Naruto who had no knowledge of wars, and Sasuke who was a victim of one; his entire clan had been annihilated to avoid a potential civil war. As a result, Kishimoto created Nagato as a war victim who would kill Jiraiya, and act as Naruto's nemesis so he would understand the tragedy that Sasuke had experienced. As a result, Naruto's coming-of-age would have been completed in this arc and the final arc, where Naruto deals with world war and develops a vision of the shinobi world as well as how he should handle the conflict.

In the 2015 film, Boruto: Naruto the Movie, Kishimoto developed Boruto and Naruto's relationship from his relationship with his sons. In portraying the adult Naruto, Kishimoto did not want to make the character give a cool impression in contrast to his younger days as a war hero because Naruto being a strong father figure to Boruto would be too boring for the narrative. Similarly, Chengxi Huang wanted to properly display Naruto's facial expression during this scene, stating that while Naruto has grown up ever since his introduction, his gentle smile was the same. Manga author Mikio Ikemoto claimed the scene in which Naruto helps his son to create a Massive Rasengan was his favorite at the time of drawing Boruto, as across this moment, he had to draw Naruto's past to the point he "felt the weight of NARUTO series and its long history behind it."

==== Rivalry ====
Early in the making of the series, Kishimoto had poor faith in the manga as he believed the series was lacking something to become popular. After being recommended by his editor to give the protagonist a rival, Kishimoto wrote Sasuke with influences from Takehiko Inoue's Slam Dunk manga, which was famous for dealing with rivalries. When first introducing Sasuke, Kishimoto wrote him as a rival who never noticed Naruto. However, as the series continued, Naruto became strong enough to finally be recognized by Sasuke as a rival. He also intended for both of them to be brother-like due to the fact that both characters suffered loneliness, something that made the readers relate to them, as he noted through fan letters. By Part I's ending, the bond between Naruto and Sasuke was weakened as a result of their fight but still expected from the time when Sasuke accepted Naruto as an equal. Kishimoto compared Sasuke and Naruto to the concept of yin and yang because of their notable differences. When one of the two progressed, Kishimoto made sure the other did too. During the climax of Part I, Naruto and Sasuke engage in a mortal fight, which was directed by Atsushi Wakabayashi from Pierrot. In an interview, the director claimed that the animation was based on a journey to Lake Mashu from Hokkaido to come up with new ideas. Wakabayashi aimed for the characters to move stilted based on storyboards he made, leading to entertaining sequences. When Naruto became berserk due to the Nine-Tailed Fox's influence, Norio Matsumoto aimed to make Naruto behave like a beast, with Wakabayashi aiming to make Naruto look like an equal to his rival. The staff was inspired by 1970s series, like the boxing series Ashita no Joe, most notably its lead character, Joe Yabuki, who was often seen as an underdog the audience rooted for. However, the team still worked carefully to make the two ninjas be equals without overpowering each other.

Before the serialization began, Kishimoto had decided the ending would feature a fight between Naruto and Sasuke. He wanted the conflict to end with Naruto forgiving Sasuke as he had forgiven Nagato while also aiming it as their final battle in the manga. In regard to the fight, Kishimoto wanted to focus on hand-to-hand combat rather than ninja techniques. Anime staff Chengxi Huang said that for the animated adaptation of this fight, the group worked carefully to depict the action in every scene by showing changes on Naruto and Sasuke's clothes and hair. Huang added he felt fatigued by working so much into this fight due to reaching 70 successive cuts at a time.

The final fight between Naruto and Sasuke was considered one of the biggest challenges by the staff from Pierrot, as it took an entire month to adapt it from the manga. Director Hiroyuki Yamashita elected himself in charge of the battle, which left most of the anime members relieved due to his experience. For the scene, Pierrot received assistance from CyberConnect2, who had already adapted this battle through the fighting game Naruto Shippuden: Ultimate Ninja Storm 4. There was a need to make every movement in the fight look realistic, giving Sasuke a scary look as well as the hair movement to express the idea of both fighters willing to do anything to kill each other, which confused some due to Naruto's wish to avoid this fate. The final clash between Naruto's Rasengan and Sasuke's Chidori moves involved references from other scenes of the series to give the viewer a bigger emotional impact. The staff noted that following this fight, Sasuke's face became calmer despite his initial look, giving room to explore his redemption. A symbolism Kishimoto used in the series finale following the final battle was Naruto returning Sasuke his original bandana, representing how their bonds are tied again and no longer having a reason to kill each other.

==== Love interests ====
Naruto's romantic partner was decided during the early stages of the manga. Since Hinata Hyuga always respected Naruto, even before the series's beginning, even before his academy mentor Iruka Umino, Kishimoto felt they were meant to be. This angered his wife, who wanted Naruto to marry Sakura Haruno. When Sakura was introduced, Kishimoto did not think of her as Naruto's future wife: he saw them as being friends and teammates, although once Hinata had appeared, the author thought of forming a love triangle between the three characters. He later regretted the love triangle as he considered Naruto a fighting series with little focus on romance, and he reiterated that "[i]t was all about Naruto and Hinata getting married from an early stage."

When seeing the staff's work to focus a film on Naruto's relationship with Hinata, The Last: Naruto the Movie, Kishimoto decided to oversee the project. Nevertheless, he enjoyed seeing Naruto and Hinata's romantic scenes that he did not write. In regard to Naruto's rank, which remains as the lowest one, Genin, due to Naruto spending most of his time in Part II fighting and training, Kishimoto decided Naruto would skip the following ranks to become the Hokage, which he felt was appealing. In the making of The Last: Naruto the Movie, Hinata makes a red scarf for Naruto. This was based on something Kishimoto's wife actually once did, which brought laughs to the staff developing the film.

Screenwriter Maruo Kyozuka said that he wanted to depict a love triangle between Naruto, Hinata, and Toneri Otsutsuki in the film. Although Naruto is initially clueless about Hinata's feelings for him, during the film, he begins to acknowledge and respond to them. Hinata's character was also developed in the film, with Kyozuka saying that she had to put aside her feelings for Naruto to accept Toneri's proposal so she could find Hanabi. During this scene, Kyozuka wanted to depict Naruto at his lowest after his rejection by Hinata. He then returned Naruto to his brave self, with the character resolving to continue his mission regardless of the cost. Animator Chengxi Huang, who worked on multiple Naruto series, took a liking to this couple ever since he started working on Naruto Shippuden, often aiming to draw scenes of the two and most notably a scene from the final arc when Hinata slaps Naruto to calm him following the death of Neji Hyuga. In the making of the film, he thanked Kishimoto for accepting to do The Last, where the couple was explored furthermore. He looked at their adult selves as an appealing married couple but had to remove a video he made that received backlash for being inappropriate for the demographic.

=== Design ===
Although a real ninja wears blue to be inconspicuous, Kishimoto gave Naruto an orange jumpsuit to fit the shōnen genre. His wardrobe is based on clothing that Kishimoto wore when he was younger. According to him, a pre-existing design would not have made Naruto unique, whereas something original would have made him too distinctive. Because Naruto is associated with spirals in terms of objects he uses, the designer incorporated swirl patterns into the costume. Initial illustrations depicted Naruto in boots, but Kishimoto replaced these with sandals because he enjoys drawing toes. The goggles Naruto used to wear were replaced with a hitai-ite, or shinobi headband, because they were too time-consuming to draw. One of the most difficult design choices was the color palette of Naruto's outfit. The orange in his costume makes Naruto pop, and the blue parts are complementary. Kishimoto apologized to the anime staff for Naruto's design, as he considered it too difficult to animate.

Kishimoto was satisfied with his character having blond hair and blue eyes, something rarely seen in Japanese anime or manga. This also appealed to an international readership, something the editor of the American magazine Shonen Jump has noted. Of all his series' characters, Kishimoto most identified with Naruto. When asked why Naruto's favorite food was ramen instead of kitsune udon, Kishimoto said that he himself likes eating ramen. In the Naruto: Clash of Ninja video game series, Naruto is playable in various stages of the Demon Fox's manifestation, characterized by a red chakra. Kishimoto took inspiration from the games' presentation of these forms, imitating one of them for the manga cover of volume 26.

When designing Naruto for his Part II appearance, Kishimoto changed his character's clothing to an orange and black top, orange pants, and black sandals. He also gave him a red cape with black flames at the bottom when fighting Pain, a member of the Akatsuki. He drew Naruto's forehead protector wider to make his eyebrows easier to draw, something that had bothered him with his previous design. He also noted that Naruto's pants made the character look too childish. To remedy this, Kishimoto designed them to roll up, giving him a more mature appearance. He gave Naruto this look to make him stand out during action scenes.

For the events of the film The Last: Naruto the Movie (2014) as well as the final episodes of Naruto: Shippuden, Naruto was given a young adult appearance. His hair was made shorter, while his height was expanded notably in contrast to his Part II design. He was given two different outfits, a casual look consisting of an orange shirt as well as a design consisting of a black shirt with orange pants specifically meant for his missions. Due to his growth, Naruto wears a different headband, while his new ninja appearance was created with the purpose of being able to carry weapons more easily. Nevertheless, both looks keep the character's spiralling logo that was carried from his late mother's gone group, the Uzumaki clan.

=== Voice actors ===
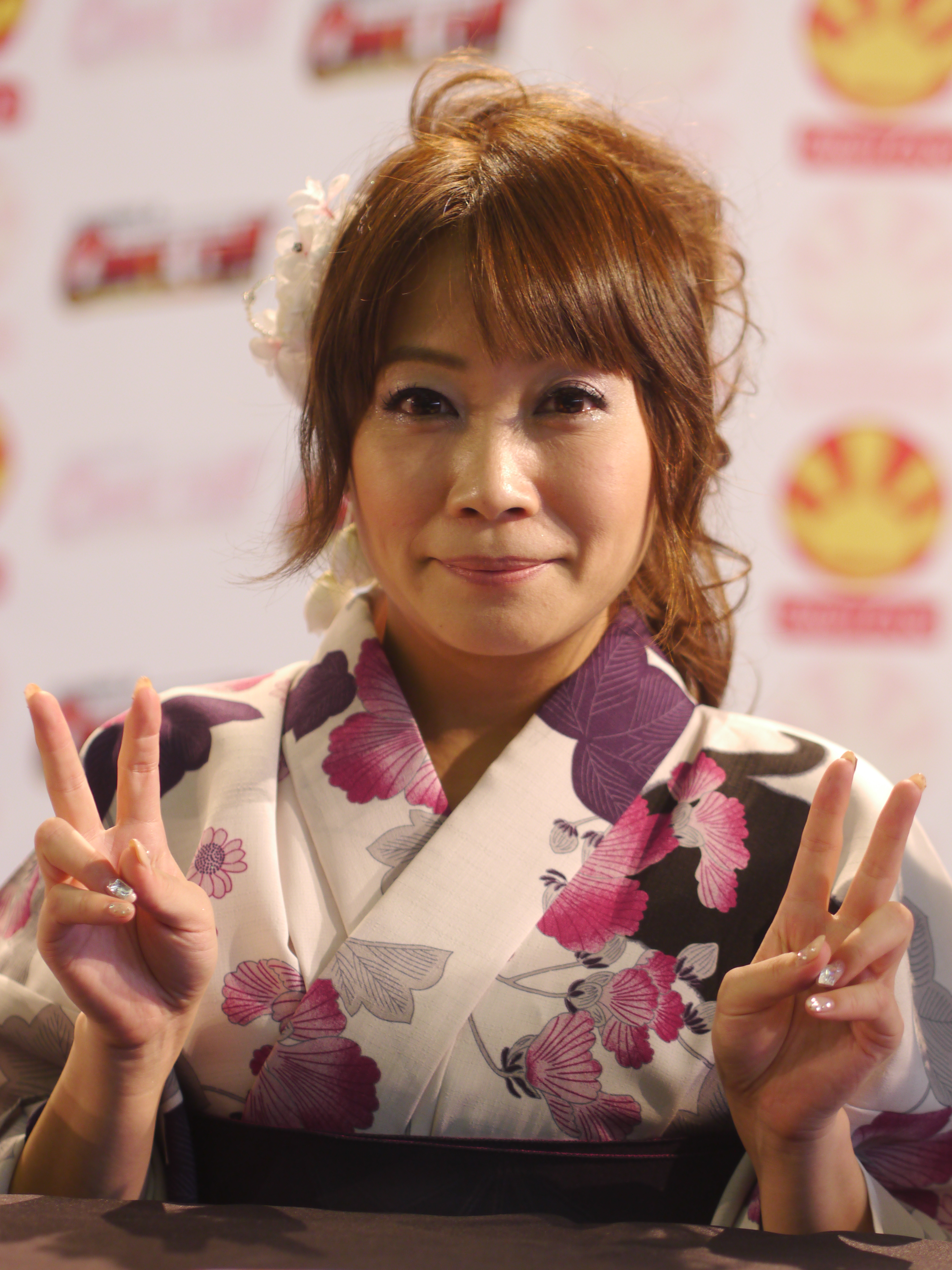
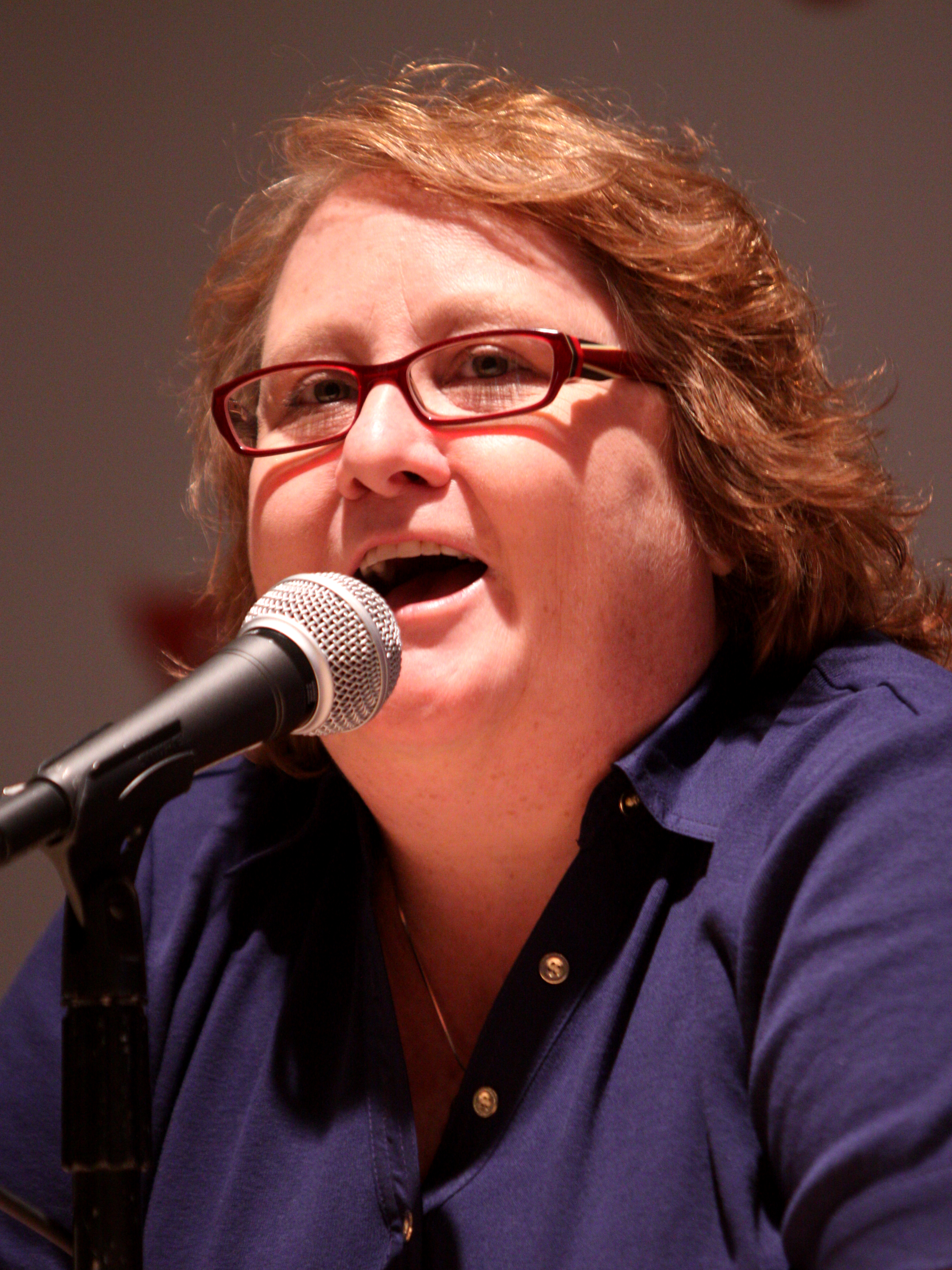
Junko Takeuchi (left) and Maile Flanagan (right) voiced Naruto Uzumaki in the anime's Japanese and English versions, respectively.

Although a male voice actor was sought for the role of Naruto in the Japanese adaptation, actress Junko Takeuchi was chosen instead over many male applicants. Before recording the first episode, Takeuchi noticed several lines from the script that ended with exclamation marks, which helped her to define Naruto's voice. She noted difficulties in transitioning from the young Naruto to the older Naruto in the animated adaptation of Part II. She had to record the first episode of Part II when Naruto's character was older and more mature, only one week after voicing the younger, immature character. Nine years after first voicing the character, while still finding it tough to voice Naruto, Takeuchi's opinion of him changed, with her feeling he was "a very reliable young man" compared to the "loud-mouthed obnoxious brat" he was before. She admired his ability to prioritize and calmly make important decisions and believes these traits will inspire viewers worldwide.

In regard to Naruto's growth, Takeuchi was happy with the story and had hoped that Naruto would end up in a relationship with Hinata. Takeuchi was reminded of Naruto's late godfather, Jiraiya, when she read the script. She thought that although Naruto's declaration of love was the most important part of the character's growth, his true nature had not changed at that point. Satisfied with the story, Takeuchi thought that the audience would agree with her view. For the film Boruto: Naruto the Movie, Takeuchi was surprised with how Naruto has grown up ever since she first voiced him, not only in the idea of age or new job but also the fact that he has become a father. As a result, she befriended Yūko Sanpei, the voice actress behind Boruto. Takeuchi felt the writing for the adult Naruto was different from his younger days, as his mannerisms had changed too, joking that she never saw such growth in the story when first voicing him. As a result, she mentions having had some inner complications with how she should show the character's growth.

The producers of the English version of the anime stated that Naruto was the most difficult character to cast, adding that Maile Flanagan "has Naruto down, from the mischievous side, that precocious 12-year-old we learn to love, to the serious side." Her performance has been praised for showing Naruto's brashness and later growth in confidence. In a 2014 interview, Flanagan claimed she had never heard of Naruto before her audition. She looked the show up after being chosen and felt the release of the English dub would be popular. She is recognized more for her work voicing Naruto than from the other roles she has done in her career, although some fans did not expect that Naruto would be voiced by a woman. Flanagan and Amanda C. Miller (the voice actress of Boruto) found the two family members similar in nature despite having different backgrounds. Flanagan was surprised by how her character changed across the years but felt he was still the same for her, finding it challenging to voice Naruto again when coming back to voice the younger Naruto. In regard to the change of tone, Flanagan was surprised by the fact that the dubbers did not replace her despite Naruto's age but felt it was something common in Japanese series.

== Synopsis ==
Introduced as a 12-year-old orphan boy with blond, spiky hair and blue eyes, Naruto Uzumaki graduates as a ninja from Konohagakure while bonding with his teacher, Iruka Umino. Naruto seeks attention as he was ridiculed during his childhood. To be accepted and respected, he resolves to become Konohagakure's Hokage and surpass all previous leaders, no matter the difficulties. While becoming a ninja, Naruto forms friendships that he initially lacked, linking some of them to family relationships. Although Naruto sometimes finds himself unable to accomplish the tasks he proposes to do, other characters believe that he will be an excellent Hokage because of his positive impact on their lives. As an adult, Naruto claims that the Konohagakure village became his family due to his job of being the Seventh Hokage, something he learned from the Third Hokage, Hiruzen Sarutobi. As a result, he initially suffered a poor relationship with his son, Boruto, due to the little time he spent with his bloodline family.

== Appearances ==
=== In Naruto ===
==== Part I ====
Naruto is an orphan who has a dangerous fox-like entity known as Kurama the Nine-Tailed Fox sealed within his body by his father, the Fourth Hokage Minato Namikaze, the leader of the Hidden Leaf Village, at the cost of his own life and that of his mother, Kushina Uzumaki. This possession led to Naruto being ridiculed frequently by the rest of the Leaf Village; being associated with him was considered taboo. As a youth, Naruto makes jokes and plays pranks to attract attention. Desiring what he lacked in his early life, Naruto dreams of becoming a Hokage himself with the hope that it will bring him the villagers' recognition and respect. In an attempt to become a ninja, Naruto is horrified to learn of his Jinchuriki nature by Mizuki but finds acceptance from his teacher, Iruka Umino, whom he views as a father figure. After learning the powerful Multi-Shadow Clone Jutsu, an ability to create physical copies of the user, Naruto becomes a ninja rank Genin. He joins a ninja group under the leadership of Kakashi Hatake, where he makes friends with Sasuke Uchiha and Sakura Haruno. These are his classmates who are also assigned to Team 7: Sasuke Uchiha, with whom he has had a rivalry since they first met at the ninja academy, and Sakura Haruno, who he has a crush on, which is not reciprocated by her as she is infatuated with Sasuke.

While being examined to increase his ninja rank to Chunnin, Naruto meets the Legendary Sannin Jiraiya and learns how to summon toads to aid him in battle and to control part of Kurama's chakra energy. The exams are interrupted by the invasion of Hidden Leaf Village by the criminal Orochimaru and the ninja of Hidden Sand Village. Naruto defeats the Sand Village's One-Tail jinchuriki, Gaara, and convinces him there is a better way to live. Shortly afterward, Naruto discovers the Akatsuki, a criminal organization that seeks to extract Kurama from his body. Though Jiraiya drives them off during this first meeting, he learns that one of its members, Itachi Uchiha, is both Sasuke's older brother and the man who killed their family, and that the Akatsuki plans to kidnap him. While accompanying Jiraiya to find a new village leader, Naruto also learns the Rasengan (螺旋丸), a sphere of chakra for offensive purposes. When Sasuke leaves the village to join Orochimaru's forces to obtain the power to kill Itachi, Naruto, on his insistence and promise to Sakura, becomes part of a rescue team to retrieve him. Naruto and Sasuke ultimately have a one-on-one battle on the Valley of the End, and after a close battle, Sasuke comes out as the victor. He, however, can not bring himself to kill Naruto and instead leaves. The two go their separate ways, but Naruto does not give up on Sasuke, leaving with Jiraiya for two and a half years to prepare himself for his next encounter with Sasuke and the Akatsuki.

==== Part II ====
After his two and a half years of training, Naruto returns the Leaf Village and begins to deal more actively with the Akatsuki by saving Gaara from their clutches. To fight them, Naruto trains with Kakashi to infuse the Rasengan with his own wind-element chakra, creating the Wind Release: Rasenshuriken (風遁・螺旋手裏剣, Fūton: Rasenshuriken) attack that proves instrumental in the downfall of the Akatsuki member Kakuzu. Despite being targeted by the Akatsuki, Naruto dedicates himself to finding and retrieving Sasuke, who eventually disposes of Orochimaru and starts acting on his vengeance-driven whims. Over time, though resisting the urge to use the Nine-Tails's power, Kurama's influence over him expands, and Naruto begins to lose his rationality as more chakra manifests in the form of tails to the point the Tailed Beast can take control of his body. This ultimately causes him to go on a rampage and berserk, destroying everything in his path.

After learning that Jiraiya has been killed by the Akatsuki leader, Pain, Naruto prepares for a future encounter by learning toad-style Senjutsu (仙術; lit. "sage techniques"), a power-enhancing ability involving the gathering of natural energy through stillness, while also perfecting Naruto's Rasenshuriken in the process. When they face off, Naruto is pinned to the ground with iron rods and loses control of Kurama's chakra once again when Hinata Hyuga nearly dies protecting him from Pain. At that time, Naruto meets his late father, Minato Namikaze, who had sealed his chakra imprint into Naruto, and learns about his parentage and that his father sealed Kurama into him so that he could use it to defeat the Akatsuki founder, Obito Uchiha, who was behind Kurama's attack on Hidden Leaf Village. With Minato stopping the Nine-Tails, Naruto regains control of his body and defeats Pain. Learning that they are both Jiraiya's students, Naruto convinces Nagato to cease his plans, seeking to take Jiraiya's path to create a better ninja world.

When Naruto discovers Sasuke's plan to attack the Leaf Village, he decides to confront him in a battle that could end both their lives should Naruto be unable to save him. He prepares himself for the upcoming fight by becoming a student of the Eight-Tails jinchuriki, Killer B, to take full control of Kurama's powers. He succeeds with help from his late mother, Kushina Uzumaki, who placed a chakra imprint of herself within the seal so that she could have a chance to see her son again. When Naruto learns that all his comrades are battling Obito's army to protect him, he takes Killer B to join him in the battle, eventually cooperating with Kurama. As he fights, Naruto meets Hagoromo Ōtsutsuki, the Sage of the Six Paths, who grants him a sealing technique to take down the Ten-Tails. After he and Sasuke join forces to face both Obito and Madara Uchiha, who are using the Ten-Tails, they have to seal a bigger threat named Kaguya Ōtsutsuki, who is in her Ten-Tails form. After sealing Kaguya with the cooperation of the rest of Team 7, Naruto ends up having to fight Sasuke in the Valley of the End due to their conflicting views regarding the ninja world's future. As both end up losing an arm, Naruto and Sasuke reconcile. He receives a new arm created from the First Hokage Hashirama Senju's cells later. Years later, Naruto is married to Hinata, with whom he has had two children – Boruto Uzumaki and Himawari Uzumaki. He becomes the Seventh Hokage (七代目火影, Nanadaime Hokage) in the epilogue.

=== In Boruto ===
In the spin-off manga Naruto: The Seventh Hokage and the Scarlet Spring, Naruto and his allies go to defeat a new Akatsuki organization led by the so-called Uchiha known as Shin Uchiha, as Sasuke fears Kaguya's allies might try to attack them. In Boruto: Naruto the Movie (2015), which takes place after the series' epilogue, Naruto's Hokage status strains his relationship with his son Boruto as his duties often kept him from his family. During the ninja examinations, Naruto is abducted by Kaguya's clanmates, Momoshiki Ōtsutsuki and Kinshiki Ōtsutsuki, and then saved by his son Boruto, Sasuke, and the Kage, before helping his son to destroy Momoshiki. Across this fight, Naruto and Boruto reconcile. In Boruto: Naruto Next Generations, the manga starts in a distant future where Naruto is implied to be dead or missing in action by an enemy of Boruto, Kawaki. In the anime, before Boruto became a ninja rank Genin, Naruto often made appearances with his new family. In the manga, a young Kawaki is adopted by Naruto when the teenager becomes a fugitive from the group Kara. Naruto clashes with the members from Kara to protect his children, to which the village fears the Ōtsutsuki clan is planning to attack again through Kara's members as well, like Boruto and Kawaki, who share a cursed mark known as Karma. In the fight against Kara's true leader, Isshiki Ōtsutsuki, Naruto and Kurama combine their chakra together at the cost of their possible death. In the aftermath, Kurama reveals that he lied to Naruto about this combination, knowing that he would refuse to use their newfound power if it meant that Kurama would die, and he goes to the afterlife. Naruto continues to fight against the remaining Kara members. Kawaki's desire to protect Naruto results in sending him alongside Hinata to timeless dimension where the two will be trapped without aging until he believes the current fights are over.

=== In light novels ===
Naruto also appears in the epilogue light novels of the series. In the first one, despite still not having obtained his prosthetic arm, he goes on a mission with his friend Sai to capture a dangerous ninja named Garyō. In the second one, he allies with Hidden Sand Village ninja Temari's team to find the missing Shikamaru Nara, who made a promise to him to work together once Naruto became the Seventh Hokage. He makes a brief appearance in Sakura Hiden, where he and Hinata try to aid Sakura from a group of enemies. In Sasuke Hiden, he sends a message to Sasuke, which convinces him to return to Hidden Leaf Village. In the final one, Konoha Hiden, Naruto marries Hinata after asking his former mentor, Iruka Umino, to take the place of his father for the wedding. A novel by Mirei Miyamoto focuses on Naruto's life as a father. Another novel, Naruto Retsuden, explores Naruto having fallen ill as a result of relying on Kurama's chakra across his entire life.

=== In other media ===
As the series's title character, Naruto appears in every movie in the series. He typically appears as the lead character on a mission with comrades from Hidden Leaf Village. Naruto: Shippūden the Movie marks the first appearance of Naruto in his Part II form. In Road to Ninja: Naruto the Movie, an alternate version of the character named Menma appears as the main antagonist of the film. In The Last: Naruto the Movie, which takes place after the events of the series, Naruto faces Toneri Ōtsutsuki; at the movie's climax, Naruto and Hinata enter a relationship that eventually leads to their marriage. Kishimoto, the film's chief story supervisor, admitted that he was embarrassed writing romance scenes in the series. However, upon watching Naruto and Hinata share their first kiss, he felt a mixture of satisfaction and sadness due to the two characters' growth since Naruto's beginning; they had become like his own children.

Naruto also appears in all four OVAs produced for the series: helping his friend Konohamaru Sarutobi find a four-leaf clover in the first, escorting a ninja to his village and fighting the criminal who stole the village's "Hero's Water" in the second, participating in a tournament in the third, and working with Team 7 in the fourth. He appears as a supporting character in the spin-off manga titled Rock Lee and his Ninja Pals, where his fellow Hidden Leaf Village ninja Rock Lee is the main character.

Naruto is a playable character in the Naruto video games. In several titles, it is possible to access a special version of him enhanced with the power from the Nine-Tailed Fox. In several games from the Ultimate Ninja series, he is playable with his own versions of Rock Lee and Might Guy's techniques while wearing their costumes. Naruto Shippūden: Gekitou Ninja Taisen EX marks the first appearance of Naruto in his Part II form in a video game. For the series' 10th anniversary, Masashi Kishimoto drew an illustration of Naruto as Hokage. This portrayal of Naruto later appears as a secret character in the game Naruto Shippuden: Ultimate Ninja Storm 2. Naruto also appears in the iOS and Android mobile game Naruto Shippuden: Ultimate Ninja Blazing. Outside Naruto, he appears in several crossover video games that feature Naruto fighting against characters from other manga; these games include Battle Stadium D.O.N, Jump Super Stars, and Jump Ultimate Stars. A Naruto avatar made a guest appearance in the MMORPG Second Life for a Jump Festa promotion titled Jumpland@Second Life. In Dragon Ball Z: Battle of Z, Naruto's costume appears as an alternate costume for Goku. Naruto was added to Fortnite Battle Royale in November 2021 as an alternate skin.

The character also appeared in the first popularity poll from the manga My Hero Academia by Kōhei Horikoshi. When the Naruto manga ended, Eiichiro Oda drew a cover of a One Piece manga chapter where Naruto is seen eating with the One Piece characters. Naruto also makes an appearance in Live Spectacle Naruto (2015) and Live Spectacle Naruto: Song of the Akatsuki (2017), two stage plays based on the manga. Naruto is played by Koudai Matsouka.

== Reception ==
=== Characterization and themes ===
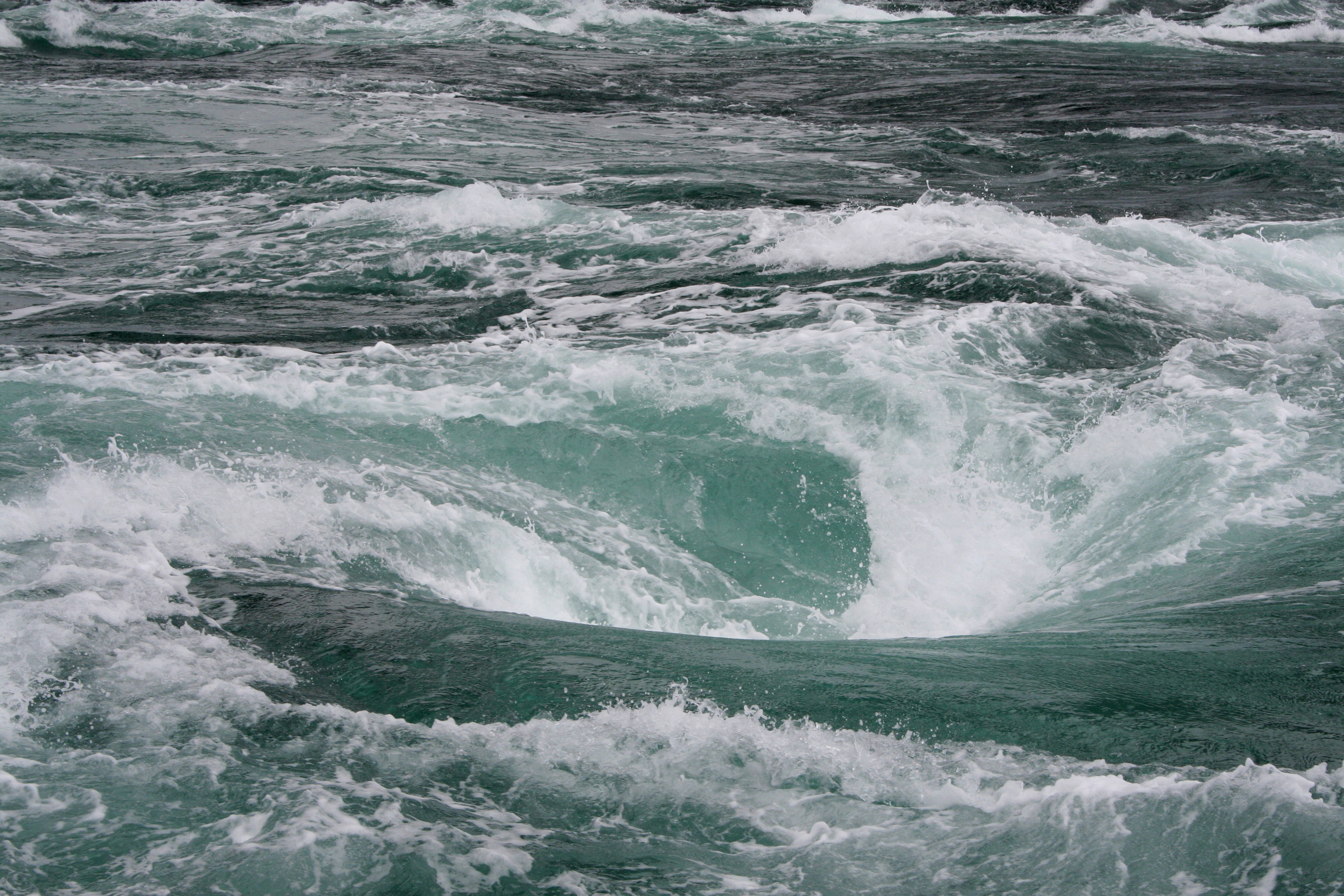
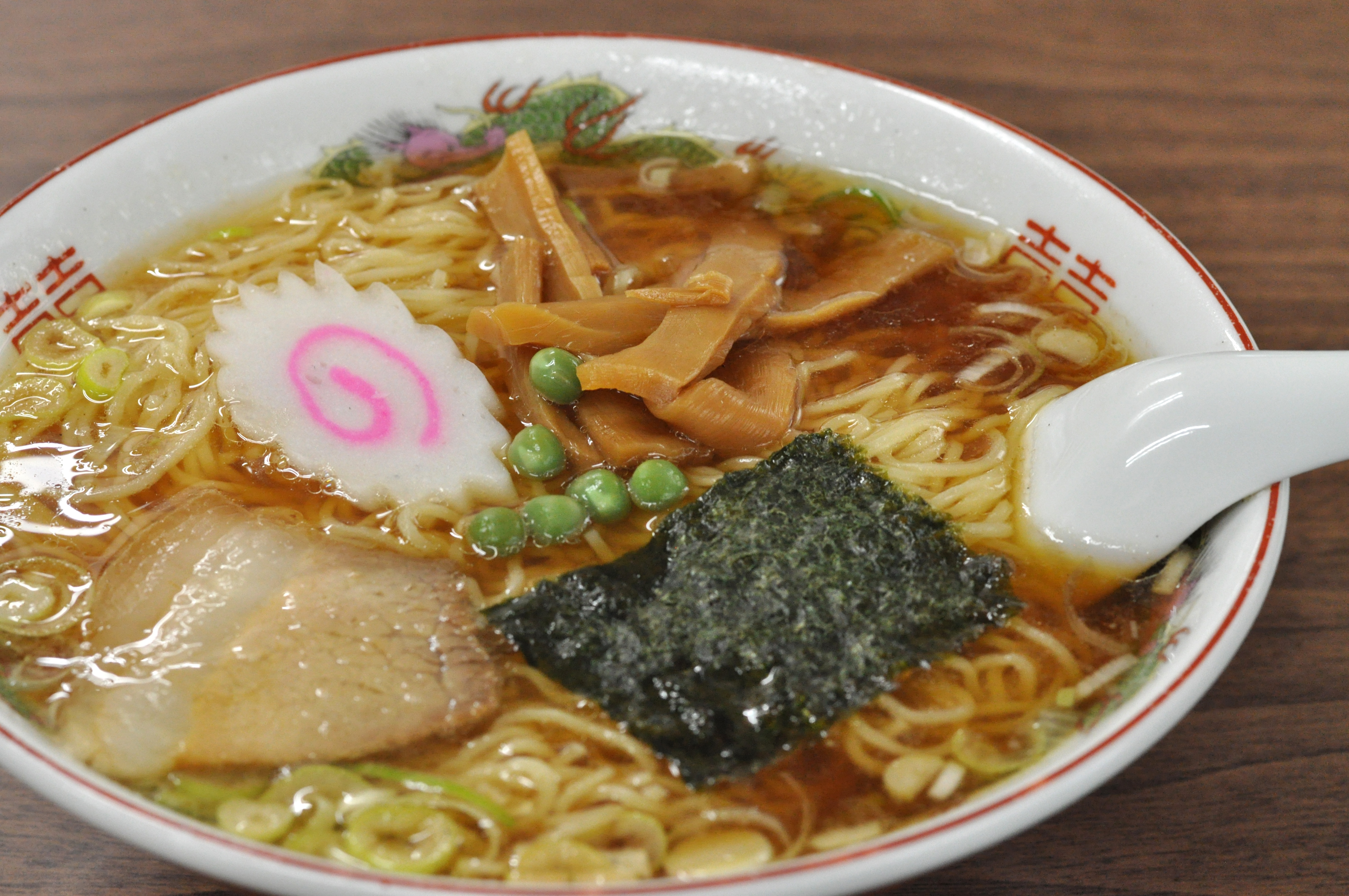
Clockwise:
- According to Franziska Ehmcke, Naruto's name emphasizes his energetic personality, reminiscent of the Naruto whirlpools.
- Franziska Ehmcke regards the inclusion of narutomaki (pictured as a garnish in a bowl of ramen) as the origin of the character's name to be a humorous addition.
- Amy Plumb relates Naruto's development to the mythology of the kitsune.

Naruto's character has received mostly positive critical response in printed and online publications. Praise was given by Joseph Szadkowski of The Washington Times, who noted that Naruto "has become a pop-culture sensation". Naruto's character was analyzed by GameSpot's Joe Dodson, who noted that despite having an "ideal" life, he still suffered from severe isolation, although he was praised for his optimistic personality by Carl Kimlinger of Anime News Network (ANN). Writers for Mania Entertainment labeled him a "good lead character" with good overall development despite certain problems at the beginning. Christina Carpenter of T.H.E.M. Anime Reviews disagreed with other writers, noting that while Naruto is a "likable enough scamp," his type of character has been done before in many anime and manga series. Yukari Fujimoto, a professor at Meiji University, sees Naruto himself as the manga's weakness. Manga author Nobuhiro Watsuki compared Naruto with Himura Kenshin and Monkey D. Luffy due to how they follow the ideals of not killing their opponents. My Hero Academia author Kōhei Horikoshi praised the portrayal of Naruto in the manga for his parallels with Sasuke, with an early example being the protagonist's inferiority complex over his teammate for feeling weaker, which leads to him stabbing himself in the hand to remember not to run away from his fears.

Writing for Popular Culture in Counseling, Psychotherapy, and Play-Based Interventions, Lawrence Rubin states that while Naruto has an optimistic and hyperactive personality, the Nine-Tailed Demon Fox (Kurama) within his body symbolizes his negative emotions. He comments that Naruto has a malevolent attitude when dealing with intense conflicts and emotions. He also states that Naruto would use Kurama's chakra for battles he can not handle with his own chakra. Rubin further notes that the more Naruto uses Kurama's chakra, the more he puts his comrades and himself in danger. Rubin feels the reason Naruto is a troublemaker is because some villagers avoid him and others mistreat him. He states that children growing up in the real world who have development issues can relate to his character. Rubin states that the search for acceptance and being acknowledged by his peers is what motivates Naruto to keep going until he reaches his life's goal, becoming the Hokage. Rubin feels that Naruto's fights with enemies who try to bring harm to the Leaf Village further motivate him to become a powerful shinobi and a "complete and mature person." Rubin concludes that Naruto's character development is similar to that of a modern American hero, the type who accidentally becomes better during a series and is able to build or restore peace.

Christopher A. Born, writing for DOAJ journal ASIANetwork Exchange, regards Naruto as a complex post-modern hero, showing "great heart." From Naruto's beginning, Born comments that the character is a nuisance, suggesting Naruto is the very definition of the word, given how he is characterized in the series, including how he interacts and his behavior. Born argues that Naruto as a whole shows Confucian values and that Naruto himself unsettles harmony in society. Amy Plumb, a PhD candidate at Macquarie University, states that Kishimoto used the mythology of the kitsune for Naruto's development throughout the series. She notes that at the beginning of the series, Naruto was a prankster and always causing trouble, the same as the kitsune. Plumb describes the Kyuubi (Demon) seal on Naruto's stomach as a catalyst for how he develops. Writing for Manga's Cultural Crossroads, Omote Tomoyuki compliments Naruto's character, saying that he has great ambition to achieve a tragic destiny. He comments on how the character has matured over the course of the series, stating how after he became a shinobi, he had let go of his childish ways that happened in the beginning of the series and how he rarely joked around in Part II of the series when he became a teenager. Franziska Ehmcke, professor of Japanese studies at Cologne University, theorized that Naruto was named after whirlpools of the sea landscape of the Awa no Naruto and compared his behavior to that natural feature, as both figures have uncontrollable energy within them. Mike Hale compared Naruto to Buffy Summers of Buffy the Vampire Slayer, praising the series's portrayal of childhood loneliness. Rik Spanjers regards Naruto's childishness as one of his strengths because it gives him a well of resoluteness from which to draw on in his goal to end the ninja wars.

Analyzing Naruto's coming-of-age story, The Lawrentian found that Naruto's development embodies the idea of Bildungsroman, the idea of how important Naruto's growth across the narrative is to move on the arc. Due to lacking parenting as a result of his parents' age during his birth, Naruto's personality starts fragile. Unaware of them, Naruto seeks to accomplish his mother's wish of becoming a hero and leader of the village, the Hokage. While initially portrayed as a weak character, Naruto finds strength in his mentors, Kakashi and Jiraiya, as well as his connections with Sakura and Sasuke. As a result of losing Jiraiya, Naruto seeks to accomplish his mentor's wish of ending wars and the cycling of hatred, making Kishimoto capable of embodying the character more with the reader while maturing in the process. As a result, The Lawrentian finds that Naruto's character fills the concept of Bildungsroman, something other fictional characters fail to accomplish.

Tejal Suhas Bagwe from Dissertation Submitted in Partial Fulfillment for the Degree of Masters of Arts in English describes Jiraiya's death as the "loss of innocence" Naruto goes through, paralleling his life with Gaara, Sasuke, and Madara. However, unlike these three characters who seek revenge and chaos for their losses, Naruto instead chooses another path derivative from these types of narratives, becoming more unique. Another aspect noted by the writer in regard to Naruto's character is how he becomes Kurama's companion despite the creature bearing hatred towards mankind for being used, resulting into multiple references to Japanese mythology based on its name and the new skills Naruto acquires when befriending the fox. Similarly, Anime News Network stated that thanks to Naruto's newfound pacifism when dealing with his quest of revenge and the rejection of violence, the story managed to become a "masterpiece".

Naruto was also analyzed in regards to his adult characterization. Midwest Book Review noted the love story between Naruto and Hinata from The Last to have been properly written enough to appeal to casual fans of romance. Antônio Guilherme Bernardes Galletti from the University of São Paulo notes Boruto: Naruto the Movie becomes complex when the protagonist learns of the shinobi code his father and master use, which was also compared to the samurais' bushido while developing a sense of individuality when deciding what to do with his life when growing up. Tata Ardiansyah from Universitas Islam Negeri said Pierrot expanded Naruto's family life in Boruto not only with the characters from the 2015 movie but also his new adopted son Kawaki, who grows to admire and love him despite his initial antiheroic characterization. Anime News Network also addressed how in Boruto, Naruto's adult characterization resulted in admiration from new characters such as Sarada, who wishes to succeed him as the leader of the village and protector of the younger ninjas. In "Through the Eyes of Child Soldiers: On War, Violence, and Trauma in Popular Entertainment Fictions", Benjamin Nickl compared Naruto and Boruto's dynamic to Harry Potter and the Cursed Child, as the latter has not experienced the same war that Naruto felt in the original series. The former was compared to a traditional war soldier, with the anime having Naruto remember fallen comrades or meet fellow survivors who are his friends.

=== Cultural impact ===
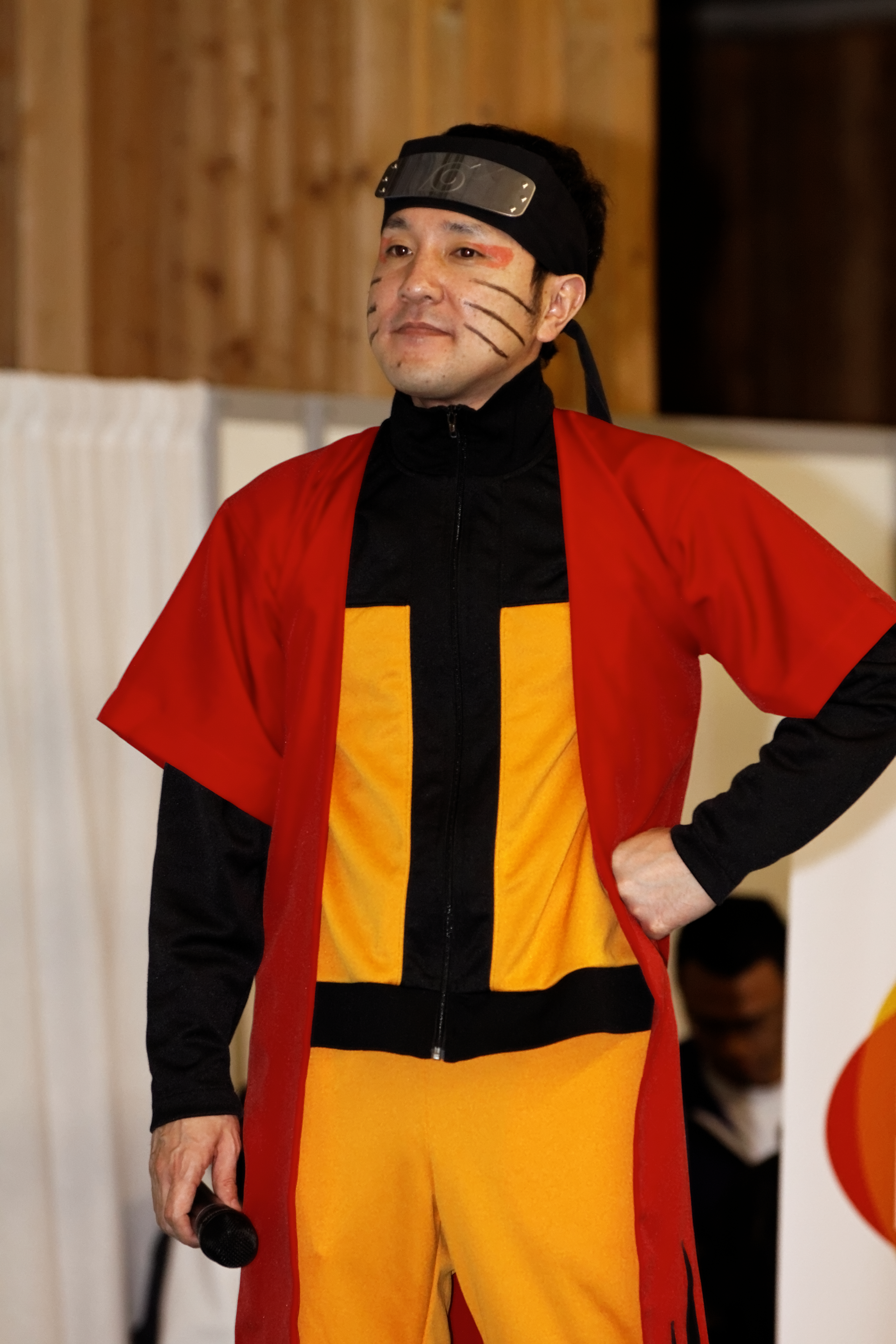
To promote games from the series, CyberConnect2 CEO Hiroshi Matsuyama cosplayed as Naruto Uzumaki.

Several journalists, including Guinness World Records, have rated Naruto among the most popular characters. In a poll from Anime! Anime!, Naruto and Sasuke were voted as one of the best rivals turned into allies. Ramsey Isler from IGN lists Naruto's "unshakable persistence" as his strongest trait, "and although he is a flawed and somewhat limited character by himself, that stubborn optimism of his makes for some great storytelling with other characters." In a Japanese TV special from August 2017, Naruto was voted as the 13th "strongest hero" from the Heisei Era. In the 2009 Society for the Promotion of Japanese Animation Awards, Junko Takeuchi won Best Voice Actress (Japanese) for her work as Naruto.

The character has inspired other works, including .hack's protagonist, Kite, Yuta Okkotsu and Yuji Itadori from Jujutsu Kaisen; its author, Gege Akutami, enjoyed the story of how Naruto deals with a demon-like creature inside his body and decided to give Yuta and Itadori a similar aura when eating the remains of the demons Rika Ryomen Sukuna, with whom they have a poor relationship. CyberConnect2 CEO Hiroshi Matsuyama also participated in the 2012 Paris Marathon while cosplaying as Naruto to celebrate the release of a new video game. Matsuyama also said that Naruto's Rasenshuriken was his favorite technique in the entire series due to its sounds as well as how the character executes it. Upon seeing the final fight between Naruto and Sasuke in Storm 4, Matsuyama felt emotional over seeing the final fight between Naruto and Sasuke. Voice actress Mariya Ise, famous for Killua Zoldyck from Hunter × Hunter, stated Naruto was one of her favorite characters, to the point she often would try cosplaying as him.

The Shanghai New World mall made an announcement in the beginning of 2019 that it planned on opening an indoor theme park on its eleventh floor, which would be called "Naruto World". The theme park was 7,000 square meters in size and would be based on the Naruto manga. As part of an official Naruto Ramen Takeover, Viz Media has partnered with Los Angeles' Silverlake Ramen to create Ramen Ichiraku. In June 2019, a life-size statue designed by Tetsuya Nishio was developed for display at the Wonder Festival 2019 Shanghai event. For the 2020 Summer Olympics, Naruto's image was used as a character to represent the event. In 2025, Google created an easter egg showing the character and his shadow clones in 8-bit performing the Naruto run when users search "Naruto" to celebrate the 25th manga anniversary.

Naruto has had an influence on hip-hop music. Many rappers, both underground and mainstream, have sprinkled Naruto references throughout their songs. Singer Diana Garnet expressed her pleasure at recording one of the ending theme songs for the animated series of Naruto Shippuden, stating that not only has she been a fan of the series ever since she was younger, but she was also motivated by Naruto's character because of his determination not to give up no matter what challenge he faced. Similarly, in an analysis involving stereotypes of African Americans created by the British newspaper The Guardian, Naruto's character is viewed as a relatable character due to the prejudicial treatment the character receives early in the series. As a result, Naruto's life achievements he makes across the narrative, ending to his portrayal as the Seventh Hokage, are seen as inspiring by the audience.
