= Kawaki =

Fictional character from Boruto

Kawaki Uzumaki
- Boruto character
- Kawaki as designed by Mikio Ikemoto
- First appearance: Boruto: Naruto Next Generations chapter 1: Boruto Uzumaki!! (2016)
- Created by: Ukyō Kodachi
- Designed by: Mikio Ikemoto
- Voiced by: Yuma Uchida (Note: Shin'ya Hamazoe in the pilot) (Japanese); Michael Schwalbe (Note: Chris Niosi in the pilot) (English)

In-universe information
- Family: Kokatsu (biological father); Unnamed biological mother; Naruto Uzumaki (adoptive father); Hinata Uzumaki (adoptive mother); Boruto Uzumaki (adoptive younger brother); Himawari Uzumaki (adoptive younger sister)
- Relatives: Hanabi Hyuga (adoptive maternal aunt); Minato Namikaze (adoptive paternal grandfather, deceased); Kushina Uzumaki (adoptive paternal grandmother, deceased); Hiashi Hyuga (adoptive maternal grandfather); Hizashi Hyuga (adoptive maternal great-uncle, deceased); Neji Hyuga (adoptive first cousin once removed, deceased)
- Ninja rank: Genin
- Ninja team: Team 7 (Team Konohamaru)

Kawaki Uzumaki (Japanese: うずまきカワキ, Hepburn: Uzumaki Kawaki) is a fictional character in Ukyō Kodachi and Mikio Ikemoto's manga franchise Boruto. Kawaki is introduced in a flashforward in the first issue of the series as Boruto's archnemesis, it is only later that his backstory is revealed: he is a rebellious member of the Kara, who wishes to escape and remove the cursed "Karma" (楔, Kāma) mark from his body. During his escape, he meets Boruto's ninja team, who takes him to the Hidden Leaf Village. The Seventh Hokage Naruto, Boruto's father, takes Kawaki under his wing, and he bonds with the family as time passes, beginning to view Naruto and Hinata as parents and Boruto and Himawari as siblings. However, due to his love for Naruto and hatred for the Ōtsutsuki Clan, he ultimately ends up accidentally swapping lives with his brother, Boruto.

Kodachi and Ikemoto created Kawaki as a major rival to Boruto. Naruto author Masashi Kishimoto suggested the idea of introducing both him and Boruto through a flashforward to cause greater impact. The character is voiced by Yuma Uchida in Japanese and Michael Schwalbe in English.

Kawaki's first appearance in the manga and anime of Boruto caused backlash from the fanbase due to his implied violent actions against Naruto. However, his debut in the narrative proper was the subject of praise for his interactions with the main character and his growth from a cold-hearted teenager to a more caring person under Naruto's influence.

== Creation and development ==
In the first pages of the first chapter of Boruto: Naruto Next Generations, a flashforward shows an older teenage Boruto Uzumaki confronting Kawaki over a ruined Konoha. The scene has a dark tone, meant to build anticipation and suspense throughout the story. When writer Ukyō Kodachi showed artist Mikio Ikemoto the script for this scene, Ikemoto was highly surprised. The artist notes that the teenage designs were created in a short amount of time, and, as a result, once the story reached this moment, the older protagonists' designs might change.

Ikemoto described the character's relationship with Boruto as antagonistic, noting both their implied past as allies and their greater vitriol towards each other compared to Naruto and Sasuke in the original Naruto manga, even clashing in visual appearance. Ikemoto has also commented that when the two interact, Boruto's design becomes more serious and "overgrown", in rebelliousness against Kawaki. When it comes to designing the characters, Kishimoto claims the clothes the characters are wearing represent their personalities; while Boruto wears Sasuke's clothing after becoming his student, Kawaki does not sport anything notable as a result of his lack of his own interest.

In December 2020, it was announced that Yuma Uchida would voice Kawaki in the anime adaptation of Boruto. Uchida was pleased with taking the role of Kawaki due to the popularity of the Boruto series. Following the announcement, Kodachi expressed joy in seeing Kawaki animated in the anime and thus looked forward to fan support. In the same month, Ikemoto stated that the anime would make further progress in regards to Kawaki's and Boruto's meeting. However, he still refrained from explaining the flashforward at the start. Ikemoto stated that more hints will be revealed about the flashforward in the future chapters, such as their growth, why they become hostile, and what Kawaki means when talking about Naruto.

== Appearances ==
Kawaki and Isshiki's Kāma

Kawaki first appears in Boruto's first chapter in a flashforward, where he and Boruto Uzumaki seem to have become enemies. An older Kawaki appears to have leveled Konoha as he confronts an older Boruto, declaring "the age of shinobi has finally come to an end".

Kawaki is introduced as a valuable piece of cargo, "the Vessel" lost to Kara in a transport accident, encountered soon afterward by Boruto's ninja team who bring him to the Hidden Leaf. Having become a member of Kara after being bought by Jigen from a cold and drunkard father as a youngster, he was given a tattoo of the Roman numeral IX under his left eye. He, alongside 13 children and teenagers, would be experimented on and bestowed a Kama mark by Jigen, and heavily modified with microscopic Shinobi-Ware implanted in his body, giving him the ability to alter his physiology for combat. Highly distrustful of Kara for Jigen's abusive and cruel treatment, Kawaki defects. To protect him from Kara, Boruto's father, the Seventh Hokage Naruto Uzumaki, adopts him as his own son. Initially distant to everybody, Kawaki spends his time with the Uzumaki family, repairing a vase Himawari made for Hinata's birthday, which he had accidentally destroyed.

When Kara's member Delta attacks the village to take Kawaki back, Naruto comes to his defense and saves him. Now growing to care for his guardian, Kawaki requests the Hokage train him to become a ninja. When Kara's leader Jigen, having tracked Kawaki, attacks the village and kidnaps Naruto, Kawaki joins Boruto and his allies Sarada Uchiha and Mitsuki to rescue the Hokage. They face the Kara member Boro, and Boruto's Karma mark causes him to be possessed by Momoshiki Ōtsutsuki, who mocks and brutally kills Boro. The team manages to rescue Naruto and return to Konohagakure, and Kawaki later learns from Amado of Jigen's true nature and relationship with the Ōtsutsuki clan. After Jigen is outsmarted and incinerated by Koji Kashin, Isshiki Ōtsutsuki (who was forced to reincarnate in Jigen's charred corpse) attacks Konoha to brand Kawaki with a new Karma and take Boruto as a sacrifice to the God Tree, since Boruto's Karma has reached a high decompression level.

Through the combined effort of Naruto, Sasuke and Kawaki, Isshiki is finally defeated. Shortly afterwards, a Momoshiki-possessed Boruto attacks Sasuke off-guard, stabbing his left eye and destroying his Rinnegan. Kawaki and a barely-conscious Sasuke manage to fend off Momoshiki until Boruto recovers his consciousness.

== Reception ==
Kawaki was first introduced to mixed reception. Allega Frank of Polygon noticed that at the start of both the manga and anime, Kawaki's debut in the flashforward caused fans to revolt over his possible future actions against the previous protagonist, Naruto Uzumaki. Finding multiple issues in the manga's premiere, Chris Beveridge of The Fandom Post gave little attention to the flashforward.

Critical opinion shifted after his introduction to the series' narrative proper. Melina Dargis of The Fandom Post found Kawaki's rivalry with Boruto similar to their predecessors Naruto and Sasuke, but noticed their differences in personality and potential for a friendlier relationship, and thus looked forward to their future development. Leroy Douresseaux anticipated that Kawaki will have a major impact in Boruto's life in regards to his way of fighting, and praised this development. Manga News found that while Kawaki's introduction might come across as forced, his relationship with Boruto's might have the potential to parallel that of Naruto and Sasuke's, although it would be hard to reach that level. IGN praised Kawaki's fight against Garo in the anime.

Critics appreciated Kawaki's character development as he interacts with the Uzumaki family, as his cold demeanor starts to mellow, most notably when he asks Naruto to train him to become a ninja. As a result, Manga News found that since his introduction, Kawaki's character development played a more major role in the narrative than that of the actual protagonist, Boruto. FandomPost agreed, claiming Kawaki's introduction to ninjutsu and bonds with the Uzumaki family to be the highlight of the manga's ninth as the young man wishes to be taught by Naruto. IGN also found Kawaki's relationship with Naruto as endearing as he was willing to return to Jigen if he does not harm the Hokage, whom they described as his 'actual' father. When Naruto and Sasuke are defeated by Kara, IGN looked forward to Kawaki and Boruto's actions to protect the Hokage, noting their Karma seals might be explored in the future to give them new powers, even though the antagonists are aware of such power and are using them. Crunchyroll regarded Kawaki as one of the most likable teenagers in anime due to how, despite starting as a rebellious antisocial youth, he quickly becomes more caring with the Uzumaki family when Naruto decides to take care of him.

Game designer Hiroshi Matsuyama from CyberConnect2 praised the debut of Kawaki in the manga due to his involvement in the narrative as well as the fight sequences he takes part of. Matsuyama also praised Ikemoto's design of Kawaki, finding the illustration of him in the cover of the series' seventh manga volume striking. In poll from 2021, Kawaki was voted as the seventh best character from Boruto: Naruto Next Generations. Kawaki's fight with Garo was also listed as the best anime fight from 2021 by Crunchyroll. Tata Ardiansyah from Syarif Hidayatullah State Islamic University Jakarta praised how Pierrot created new episodes for Kawaki as it develops more his social life alongside his family while becoming a ninja.
