= Plus-Sized Misadventures in Love! =

Japanese manga series

- Cover of the first print volume

デブとラブと過ちと！ (Debu to Rabu to Ayamachi to!)
- Genre: Romantic comedy
- Manga
- Written by: Mamakari
- Published by: NTT Solmare
- English publisher: NA: MangaPlaza (web) HarperValley; UK: 4th Estate
- Magazine: Koisuru Soirée
- Original run: September 27, 2019 – present
- Volumes: 13 (digital); 5 (print)
- Television drama
- Directed by: Ryuichi Honda
- Written by: Aya Watatane
- Music by: Satoshi Takano
- Studio: Dub
- Original network: Tokyo MX
- Original run: November 7, 2022 – December 26, 2022
- Episodes: 8
- Anime television series
- Directed by: Kazuomi Koga
- Written by: Aya Watatane
- Music by: Satoshi Hōno; Kaori Nakano
- Studio: Marvy Jack
- Licensed by: Crunchyroll
- Original network: Tokyo MX, SUN, BS Fuji, ABC TV, HTB, NCC, KKB, EBC, YTS, UX, HAB, SBS, TVA, WTV, AT-X
- Original run: October 6, 2025 – December 23, 2025
- Episodes: 12
- icon

Plus-Sized Misadventures in Love! (デブとラブと過ちと！, Debu to Rabu to Ayamachi to!) is a Japanese manga series written and illustrated by Mamakari. It began serialization on NTT Solmare's digital magazine Koisuru Soirée in September 2019, with its chapters being collected into thirteen digital volumes and five print volumes. A television drama adaptation aired from November to December 2022. An anime television series adaptation produced by Marvy Jack aired from October to December 2025.

== Plot ==
The story follows Yumeko Kōda, a plus-sized young woman who wakes up in the hospital with amnesia after an accident. The accident is deemed a suicide attempt, since Yumeko fell from four stories high and was known to be depressed due to bullying and self hatred about her size. The fall left her with a whole new positive attitude about her looks, shocking her parents. She returns back to work at the planning department of a sweets company and tackles problems with new found energy and self-love, which also spreads to her co-workers. But the accident may not have been a suicide attempt after all, and Yumeko is left to solve a possible murder mystery while trying to regain her memories, all while juggling work, love and life as plus-sized.

== Characters ==
Yumeko Kōda (幸田夢子, Kōda Yumeko)
Voiced by: Aya Endō
Portrayed by: Kanade
- A 24 year old female protagonist who was extremely depressed and had low self esteem but after a traumatic experience of falling from a four story building loses her memory and becomes convinced she is beautiful and confident.
Keisuke Yūki (結城圭介, Yūki Keisuke)
Voiced by: Yuma Uchida
Portrayed by: Takuya Kusakawa
Saki Tamai (玉井咲, Tamai Saki)
Voiced by: Akari Kitō
Portrayed by: Yūri Ota
Hiroki Maezono (前園弘樹, Maezono Hiroki)
Voiced by: Tomokazu Sugita
Portrayed by: Tsubasa Sakiyama
Yutaka Shigemori (茂森豊, Shigemori Yutaka)
Voiced by: Takuya Eguchi
Portrayed by: Hirocho Nishimura
Masahiko Hosoi (細井雅彦, Hosoi Masahiko)
Voiced by: Eiji Takeuchi
Motoki Minami (南基樹, Minami Motoki)
Voiced by: Junichi Suwabe
Shunzaburō Tanigawa (谷川俊三郎, Tanigawa Shunzaburō)
Voiced by: Shōya Chiba
Yumeko's mother (夢子母, Yumeko Haha)
Voiced by: Akeno Watanabe
Yumeko's father (夢子父, Yumeko Chichi)
Voiced by: Yasuhiro Kikuchi

== Media ==
=== Manga ===
Written and illustrated by Mamakari, Plus-Sized Misadventures in Love! began serialization on NTT Solmare's Koisuru Soirée digital magazine on September 27, 2019. The series' chapters have been collected into thirteen digital volumes as of June 2025, and five print volumes as of December 2022.

The series is published in English on NTT Solmare's MangaPlaza website and app.

No.	Release date	ISBN
1	August 28, 2020 (ebook); November 20, 2020 (print)	978-4-86-669346-0
2	August 28, 2020 (ebook); November 20, 2020 (print)	978-4-86-669347-7
3	December 3, 2020 (ebook); October 29, 2021 (print)	978-4-86-669445-0
4	October 14, 2021 (ebook); November 4, 2022 (print)	978-4-86-669532-7
5	May 6, 2022 (ebook); December 1, 2022 (print)	978-4-86-669540-2
6	January 6, 2023 (ebook)	—
7	February 3, 2023 (ebook)	—
8	March 8, 2024 (ebook)	—
9	August 2, 2024 (ebook)	—
10	January 3, 2025 (ebook)	—
11	February 7, 2025 (ebook)	—
12	March 7, 2025 (ebook)	—
13	June 6, 2025 (ebook)	—

=== Drama ===
A television drama adaptation, directed by Ryuichi Honda and written by Aya Watatane, aired on Tokyo MX from November 7 to December 26, 2022.

=== Anime ===
An anime television series adaptation was announced on November 17, 2023. It is produced by Marvy Jack and directed by Kazuomi Koga, with series composition and episode screenplays handled by Aya Watatane, character designs by Atsuko Takahashi and music composed by Satoshi Hōno and Kaori Nakano. The series aired from October 6 to December 22, 2025, on Tokyo MX and other networks. The opening theme song is "Happy Yummy Lucky Yummy", performed by Gang Parade, while the ending theme song is "Watashi de Yokatta!!!" (私でよかった！！！; 'I'm Glad It's Me!!!'), performed by Yuma Uchida. Crunchyroll is streaming the series.

==== Episodes ====
No.	Title	Directed by (Note: Production staff information is taken from the ending credits of each episode.)	Storyboarded by	Original release date
1	"Positive Thinking!"; Transliteration: "Pojitibu Shinkingu!!" (Japanese: ポジティブシンキング！！)	Kazuomi Koga	Kazuomi Koga	October 6, 2025
2	"The Man from the Park and Vice President"; Transliteration: "Kōen no Kare to Fuku Shachō" (Japanese: 公園の彼と副社長)	Takaaki Ishiyama	Nagisa Miyazaki	October 13, 2025
3	"The Old Me"; Transliteration: "Mukashi no Sugata" (Japanese: 昔の姿)	Hodaka Kuramoto	Hodaka Kuramoto	October 20, 2025
4	"Charm Point"; Transliteration: "Chāmu Pointo" (Japanese: チャームポイント)	Tokoro Toshikatsu	Tokoro Toshikatsu	October 27, 2025
5	"No Such Thing as a Bad Kid"; Transliteration: "Warui ko Nante Inai" (Japanese: 悪い子なんていない)	Michita Shiraishi	Toshihiko Masuda	November 3, 2025
6	"Yumeko and Her Mom's Relationship"; Transliteration: "Yumeko no Haha to Kōyū Kankei" (Japanese: 夢子の母と交友関係)	Kōhei Kawai	Takanari Satō	November 10, 2025
7	"The Only One in the World"; Transliteration: "Sekai ni Hitotsu Dake no……" (Japanese: 世界に一つだけの……)	Michita Shiraishi	Nagisa Miyazaki	November 17, 2025
8	"Kindness Comes with a Cold"; Transliteration: "Yasashisa wa Kaze Totomoni" (Japanese: 優しさは風邪とともに)	Hodaka Kiramoto	Hodaka Kiramoto	November 24, 2025
9	"The Person He Loves?"; Transliteration: "Kare no Sukina Hito?" (Japanese: 彼の好きな人？)	Tokoro Toshikatsu	Tokoro Toshikatsu	December 1, 2025
10	"Minami Wants to Die"; Transliteration: "Shinitagari no Minami" (Japanese: 死にたがりの南)	Kōhei Kawai	Takanari Satō	December 8, 2025
11	"The Grill-Out of Joy and Suspense"; Transliteration: "Yorokobi to Fuan no BBQ" (Japanese: 喜びと不安のBBQ)	Yuuichi Nobe	Nagisa Miyazaki	December 15, 2025
12	"Your Smile is My Happiness"; Transliteration: "Anata ga Warauto Shiawase" (Japanese: あなたが笑うと幸せ)	Hodaka Kiramoto	Yūko Horikawa	December 22, 2025
