= Yuma Uchida =

Japanese voice actor and singer (born 1992)

- 内田 雄馬
- Born: September 21, 1992 (age 34); Tokyo, Japan
- Occupations: Voice actor; singer
- Years active: 2012–present
- Agent: Intention
- Notable work: Jujutsu Kaisen as Megumi Fushiguro; Boruto: Naruto Next Generations as Kawaki; Ensemble Stars!! as Jun Sazanami; Fruits Basket as Kyo Soma; Wind Breaker as Haruka Sakura Chiikawa as Rakko
- Height: 163 cm (5 ft 4 in)
- Spouse: Rina Hidaka (m. 2024)
- Children: 1
- Relatives: Maaya Uchida (sister); Kaito Ishikawa (brother-in-law)
- Musical career
- Genres: J-pop; Anison
- Instruments: Vocals; piano
- Years active: 2018–present
- Label: King Amusement Creative
- Website: www.uchidayuma.com

Yuma Uchida (内田 雄馬, Uchida Yūma; born September 21, 1992) is a Japanese voice actor and singer who works for Intention. He is best known for his roles as Kaoru Sakuraba in The Idolmaster SideM, Jun Sazanami in Ensemble Stars!!, Yuuma Kousaka in Gundam Build Fighters Try, Nagisa Kiryū in Classroom Crisis, Megumi Fushiguro in Jujutsu Kaisen, Kawaki in Boruto: Naruto Next Generations, Haruka Sakura in Wind Breaker, Eishirō Yabuki in The Asterisk War, Hayate Immelmann in Macross Delta, Ein Dalton in Mobile Suit Gundam: Iron-Blooded Orphans, Reo Mikage in Blue Lock, Iori Kitahara in Grand Blue, Kyo Sohma in Fruits Basket, and Ash Lynx in Banana Fish. He received the 11th Seiyu Awards for Best Male Newcomer with Setsuo Itō and Yusuke Kobayashi. In 2019, he won Best Male Lead Actor in the 13th Seiyu Awards. He made his singing debut in May 2018 under the King Records label.

== Musical career ==
Uchida made his solo debut in May 2018 under the record label, King Records, releasing his first solo single "New World"; it peaked at 9th place on the Oricon Weekly Singles Chart and stayed on the chart for 4 weeks.

On September 19, 2018, he released his 2nd single entitled "Before Dawn"; it peaked at 11th place on the Oricon Weekly Singles Chart and stayed on the chart for 3 weeks. Following the release, he made his first public live performance on September 24, 2018, in King Super Live 2018 held in Tokyo Dome wherein he sang "New World", and "Before Dawn"; he, with angela, Shouta Aoi, and Mamoru Miyano collaborated in singing "Kakumei Dualism" for the encore.

On May 8, 2019, he released his 3rd single "Speechless"; it peaked at 7th place on the Oricon Weekly Singles Chart and stayed on the chart for 2 weeks. The titular song from the single was used as the ending theme song for the anime, Kono Oto Tomare!.

On May 30, 2019; he announced on his Twitter that he celebrates his 1st anniversary as a solo artist by releasing his 1st album "HORIZON" on July 24, 2019, and will also hold his 1st live tour in 3 major cities across Japan starting October. He made his first television appearance as an artist on Ongaku no Hi 2019. His first album peaked at 7th place on the Oricon Albums Weekly Chart.

On November 27, 2019, he released his 4th single "Rainbow"; it peaked at 8th place on the Oricon Weekly Singles Chart and stayed on the chart for 2 weeks. The titular song from the single was used as the ending theme song for the anime, Kono Oto Tomare!.

On February 19, 2020, he released his 5th single "Over". The titular song from the single was used as the ending theme song for the anime, Ahiru no Sora.

== Personal life ==
Uchida's older sister is fellow voice actress Maaya Uchida. On January 1, 2024, he announced his marriage to fellow voice actress Rina Hidaka. On July 19, 2026, he announced that his wife had given birth of their first child, a daughter.

In 2025, fellow voice actor and friend Kaito Ishikawa became his brother-in-law via marriage to Maaya Uchida.

== Filmography ==
=== Anime ===
List of voice performances in anime
Year	Title	Role	Notes	Source
2013	Love Lab	Boys, Store clerk		
2013	Devils and Realist	Baker		
2013	Miss Monochrome	Convenience store customer, boxing play-by-play		
2013	Beyond the Boundary	Schoolboy		
2013	Nagi-Asu: A Lull in the Sea	Hibana Asahi		
2013	Aikatsu!	Deliveryman	Season 2	
2014	Recently, My Sister Is Unusual	Basketball club member		
2014	Witch Craft Works	Schoolboy		
2014	Saki the Nationals	Reporter		
2014	No-Rin	Student		
2014	Selector Infected WIXOSS	Schoolboy		
2014	JoJo's Bizarre Adventure: Stardust Crusaders	Various characters		
2014	The Irregular at Magic High School	Various characters		
2014	Kindaichi Case Files R	Takumi Tamaki		
2014	If Her Flag Breaks	Student, Shichitoku-in (七徳院)		
2014	One Week Friends	Classmate	Ep. 2	
2014	Soul Eater Not!	Schoolboy		
2014	Ping Pong the Animation	Various characters		
2014	M3 the dark metal	Researcher		
2014	Sword Art Online II	Player		
2014	Wolf Girl and Black Prince	Schoolboy		
2014	Gundam Build Fighters Try	Yuuma Kousaka		
2014	Chaika - The Coffin Princess Avenging Battle	Various characters		
2014	Cardfight!! Vanguard G	Fighter, Painter		
2015	Saekano: How to Raise a Boring Girlfriend	Yoshihiko Kamigo		
2015	World Break: Aria of Curse for a Holy Swordsman	Kamekichi Mannendou		
2015	Magical Girl Lyrical Nanoha ViVid	Claus G.S. Ingvalt		
2015	Food Wars: Shokugeki no Soma	Male student		
2015	Blood Blockade Battlefront	Sonic Speed Monkey		
2015	Ultimate Otaku Teacher	Disguise investigator		
2015	Uta no☆Prince-sama♪ Maji Love Revolutions	Eiji Otori	Episode 13	
2015	The Heroic Legend of Arslan	Soldier		
2015	Ace of Diamond: Second Season	Kōshū Okumura		
2015	Knights of Sidonia: Battle for Planet Nine	Worker, Pilot		
2015	Classroom Crisis	Nagisa Kiryū		
2015	Snow White with the Red Hair	Kai Ulkir	2 seasons	
2015	The Asterisk War	Eishirō Yabuki	2 seasons	
2015	Mobile Suit Gundam: Iron-Blooded Orphans	Ein Dalton		
2015	Star-Myu: High School Star Musical	Eigo Sawatari		
2016	Endride	Felix		
2016	Macross Delta	Hayate Immelmann		
2016	Qualidea Code	Kasumi Chigusa		
2016	ReLIFE	Kazuomi Oga	Also OVA	
2016	Uta no☆Prince-sama♪ Maji Love Legend Star	Eiji Otori		
2017	Star-Myu: High School Star Musical 2	Eigo Sawatari		
2017	Yowamushi Pedal: New Generation	Yuuto Shinkai		
2017	King's Game The Animation	Yousuke Ueda		
2017	The Ancient Magus' Bride	Shanahan		
2017	In Another World With My Smartphone	Ende		
2017	Blood Blockade Battlefront & Beyond	Sonic Speed Monkey		
2017	The Idolmaster SideM	Kaoru Sakuraba		
2018	Sanrio Boys	Seiichiro Minamoto		
2018	Yowamushi Pedal: Glory Line	Yuuto Shinkai		
2018	The Ryuo's Work Is Never Done!	Yaichi Kuzuryū		
2018	Teasing Master Takagi-san	Nakai	3 seasons	
2018	Pop Team Epic	Hōjō	Ep. 5	
2018	Caligula	Shadow Knife		
2018	Last Hope	Gren Din		
2018	Kakuriyo: Bed and Breakfast for Spirits	Akatsuki		
2018	Tokyo Ghoul:re	Ginshi Shirazu		
2018	Banana Fish	Ash Lynx		
2018	Grand Blue	Iori Kitahara		
2018	Rascal Does Not Dream of Bunny Girl Senpai	Yūma Kunimi		
2018	Dakaichi	Ryō Narumiya		
2018	Golden Kamuy 2nd Season	Yasaku Edogai		
2018	The Idolmaster SideM Wake Atte Mini!	Kaoru Sakuraba		
2019	Manaria Friends	William		
2019	Kyou mo Tsuno ga Aru	Fried Shrimp		
2019	Zoids Wild	Salt		
2019	Ace of Diamond Act II	Kōshū Okumura		
2019	Fruits Basket	Kyo Sohma		
2019	Kono Oto Tomare! Sounds of Life	Chika Kudō		
2019	Mix	Sōichirō Tachibana		
2019	Namu Amida Bu! -Rendai Utena-	Kannō Bosatsu		
2019	King of Prism: Shiny Seven Stars	Yū Suzuno		
2019	Star-Myu: High School Star Musical 3	Eigo Sawatari		
2019	Ensemble Stars!	Jun Sazanami		
2019	Kochoki: Wakaki Nobunaga	Ikeda Tsuneoki		
2019	Given	Ritsuka Uenoyama		
2019	Ahiru no Sora	Momoharu Hanazono		
2019	Oresuki	Taiyou "Sun-chan" Ooga	Also OVA	
2019	Stand My Heroes: Piece of Truth	Hatori Ōtani		
2019	Beastars	Miguno		
2020	The Case Files of Jeweler Richard	Seigi Nakata		
2020	Toilet-Bound Hanako-kun	Teru Minamoto		
2020	Uchitama?! Have you seen my Tama?	Be Kawahara		
2020	Science Fell in Love, So I Tried to Prove It	Shinya Yukimura		
2020	Fruits Basket 2nd Season	Kyo Sōma		
2020	The God of High School	Sang Man-deok		
2020	Jujutsu Kaisen	Megumi Fushiguro		
2020	Boruto: Naruto Next Generations	Kawaki		
2021	I-Chu: Halfway Through the Idol	Futami Akabane		
2021	Dr. Ramune: Mysterious Disease Specialist	Ramune		
2021	Skate-Leading Stars	Kensei Maeshima		
2021	Burning Kabaddi	Tatsuya Yoigoshi		
2021	SSSS.Dynazenon	Onijya		
2021	Fruits Basket: The Final	Kyo Sōma		
2021	Dragon Goes House-Hunting	Orthros	Ep. 5	
2021	Shinkansen Henkei Robo Shinkalion Z	Shimakaze Anjō		
2021	Scarlet Nexus	Nagi Karman		
2021	Re-Main	Riku Momosaki		
2021	Getter Robo Arc	Takuma Nagare		
2021	The Duke of Death and His Maid	Walter		
2022	Orient	Musashi		
2022	Tokyo 24th Ward	Ran Akagi		
2022	Sasaki and Miyano	Masato Hanzawa		
2022	Salaryman's Club	Takuma Kirishima		
2022	Delicious Party Pretty Cure	Takumi Shinada		
2022	Science Fell in Love, So I Tried to Prove It r=1-sinθ	Shinya Yukimura		
2022	The Executioner and Her Way of Life	Mitsuki		
2022	Chiikawa	Rakko		
2022	Heroines Run the Show	Rio		
2022	Cardfight!! Vanguard will+Dress	Tohya Ebata		
2022	Tokyo Mew Mew New	Masaya Aoyama		
2022	I'm the Villainess, So I'm Taming the Final Boss	Isaac Lombard		
2022	The Human Crazy University	Shimoda		
2022	Bibliophile Princess	Gren Eisenach		
2022	Blue Lock	Reo Mikage		
2023	Campfire Cooking in Another World with My Absurd Skill	Tsuyoshi Mukoda		
2023	Mix 2nd Season	Sōichirō Tachibana		
2023	Opus Colors	Kazuya Yamanashi		
2023	My One-Hit Kill Sister	Siegfried		
2023	Dead Mount Death Play	Takumi Kuruya		
2023	The Marginal Service	Rubber Suit		
2023	Jujutsu Kaisen 2nd Season	Megumi Fushiguro		
2023	Rurouni Kenshin	Shinomori Aoshi		
2023	Shangri-La Frontier	Sunraku/Rakurō Hizutome		
2023	Bullbuster	Shūichi Namari		
2023	MF Ghost	Kanata Livington		
2024	The Foolish Angel Dances with the Devil	Masatora Akutsu		
2024	Villainess Level 99	Patrick Ashbatten		
2024	Wind Breaker	Haruka Sakura		
2024	Grendizer U	Cassado Zeola Whiter		
2024	Senpai Is an Otokonoko	Ryūji Taiga		
2024	Tower of God 2nd Season	Ja Wangnan		
2024	Twilight Out of Focus	Hisashi Otomo		
2024	No Longer Allowed in Another World	Yamada		
2024	Blue Box	Kengo Haryū		
2025	Medalist	Jun Yodaka		
2025	Classic Stars	Beethoven		
2025	Lazarus	Leland Astor		
2025	#Compass 2.0: Combat Providence Analysis System	Jin		
2025	Clevatess	Katz		
2025	New Saga	Kyle		
2025	Please Put Them On, Takamine-san	Seiya Ouji		
2025	Let's Go Karaoke!	Jersey		
2025	Plus-Sized Misadventures in Love!	Keisuke Yūki		
2025	Ninja vs. Gokudo	Nodoka Matsumoto		
2025	Wandance	Gaku Kabeya		
2026	Ace of Dimaond Act II season 2	Kōshū Okumura		
2026	Jujutsu Kaisen 3rd Season	Megumi Fushiguro		
2026	Sparks of Tomorrow	Kihachi Sakamoto		
2026	The Insipid Prince's Furtive Grab for the Throne	Arnold Lakes Adler		
2027	Hirayasumi	Hiroto Ikuta		
2027	The Record of a Fallen Vampire	Akabara "Rose Red" Straus		
2027	Yaiba: Samurai Legend	Gekkō		
TBA	Melody of the Boundary	Takeshi		

=== Films ===
List of voice performances in films
Year	Title	Role	Notes	Source
2016	King of Prism by PrettyRhythm	Yū Suzuno		
2017	King of Prism: Pride the Hero	Yū Suzuno		
2018	I Want to Eat Your Pancreas	Takahiro		
2018	Macross Delta the Movie: Passionate Walküre	Hayate Immelmann		
2019	Uta no☆Prince-sama♪ Maji Love Kingdom	Eiji Otori		
2019	For Whom The Alchemist Exists	Zain		
2020	Given	Ritsuka Uenoyama		
2020	Kono Sekai no Tanoshimikata: Secret Story Film	Rio		
2021	Knights of Sidonia: Love Woven in the Stars	Tōtarō Yamano		
2021	Dakaichi: Spain Arc	Ryō Narumiya		
2021	Macross Delta the Movie: Absolute Live!!!!!!	Hayate Immelmann		
2022	Fruits Basket: Prelude	Kyo Sōma		
2022	Mobile Suit Gundam: Cucuruz Doan's Island	Marcos		
2022	Kaitō Queen wa Circus ga Osuki	RD		
2022	Teasing Master Takagi-san: The Movie	Nakai		
2022	That Time I Got Reincarnated as a Slime the Movie: Scarlet Bond	Hiiro		
2023	Sasaki and Miyano: Graduation	Masato Hanzawa		
2024	Blue Lock: Episode Nagi	Reo Mikage		
2024	A Few Moments of Cheers	Daisuke Tonosaki		
2025	Eiga Senpai wa Otokonoko: Ame Nochi Hare	Ryūji Taiga		
2025	Kaitō Queen no Yūga na Kyūka	RD		
2025	Toi-san	Satan Yamada		
2025	100 Meters	Kabanoki		
2026	Cosmic Princess Kaguya!	Rai Komazawa		
2026	Chiikawa the Movie: The Secret of the Mermaid Island	Rakko		
2027	Gekijōban Medalist	Jun Yodaka		

=== Tokusatsu ===
Year	Title	Role	Notes	Source
2013	Kamen Rider × Kamen Rider Gaim & Wizard: The Fateful Sengoku Movie Battle	Bujin Riders (Kuuga to Wizard) (voiced by Tatsuya Takagi)	Movie	
2016	Kamen Rider Ghost	Planet Ganma	ep. 13 - 14	
2019	Ultraman R/B the Movie	Ultraman Tregear	Movie	
2019	Ultraman New Generation Chronicle	Ultraman Tregear	ep. 13	
2019	Ultraman Taiga	Ultraman Tregear		
2019	Ultra Galaxy Fight: New Generation Heroes	Ultraman Tregear	Web series	
2020	Ultraman Taiga The Movie	Ultraman Tregear	Movie	
2020	Ultra Galaxy Fight: The Absolute Conspiracy	Ultraman Tregear	Web series	
2022	Ultra Galaxy Fight: The Destined Crossroad	Ultraman Tregear	Web series	

=== Video games ===
List of voice performances in video games
Year	Title	Role	Notes	Source
2014	The Idolmaster SideM	Kaoru Sakuraba		
2014	I-Chu	Futami Akabane		
2014	Yume Oukoku to Nemureru Hyakunin no Oujisama	Gerald		
2015	Natsuiro High School: Seishun Hakusho	Taichi Masuno 益野太一		
2015	Band Yarouze!	Makoto Kurusu		
2016	The Caligula Effect	Shadow Knife		
2016	Sanrio Danshi ~Watashi, Koi o, Shirimashita.~	Seiichiro Minamoto		
2016	Toraware no Palm	Aoi		
2016	Namu Amida Bu! -Rendai Utena-	Kannō Bosatsu		
2016	Detective Pikachu	Tim Goodman		
2017	The King of Fighters XIV	Rock Howard		
2017	Ensemble Stars!	Jun Sazanami		
2018	DREAM!ing	Takaomi Shishimaru		
2018	Dragalia Lost	Linus, Rodrigo		
2019	Wind Boys	Takara Kuramoto		
2019	Gunvolt Chronicles: Luminous Avenger iX	Acura		
2019	SaGa: Scarlet Grace - Ambitions	Leonard		
2019	Kaikan Phrase CLIMAX -Next Generation-	Shion Okochi		
2019	Final Fantasy XIV: Shadowbringers	Crystal Exarch, G'raha Tia		
2020	Fate/Grand Order	Castor		
2020	The King of Fighters All Star	Rock Howard		
2020	Tales of Crestoria	Vicious		
2020	Ikemen Prince / イケメン王子 美女と野獣の最後の恋	Yves Kloss		
2020	Puyopuyo!! Quest	Crowlas		
2021	Jack Jeanne	Suzu Orimaki		
2021	NEO: The World Ends with You	Rindo Kanade		
2021	The Legend of Heroes: Trails Through Daybreak	Aaron Wei		
2021	Final Fantasy XIV: Endwalker	G'raha Tia		
2021	Alchemy Stars	Nails, Kleken		
2022	Gunvolt Chronicles: Luminous Avenger iX 2	Acura, Ypsilon		
2022	The King of Fighters XV	Rock Howard		
2022	Counter:Side	Rayleigh		
2022	The Legend of Heroes: Trails Through Daybreak II	Aaron Wei		
2022	Star Ocean: The Divine Force	Neyan Keizaal		
2022	Cardfight!! Vanguard Dear Days	Tohya Ebata		
2022	Dragon Quest Treasures	Margom, Monsters		
2022	Code Geass: Lelouch of the Rebellion Lost Stories	Mario Disel		
2022	Genshin Impact	Kaveh		
2023	Final Fantasy XVI	Clive Rosfield (boyhood)		
2023	Master Detective Archives: Rain Code	Seth Burroughs		
2024	Jujutsu Kaisen: Cursed Clash	Megumi Fushiguro		
2024	Under Night In-Birth II: Sys:Celes	Kuon the Aeon (Adult)		
2024	Reynatis	Jem Shinzaki		
2024	Ride Kamens	Haruma Iori / Kamen Rider Haruma		
2025	Fatal Fury: City of the Wolves	Rock Howard, Fallen Rock		
2025	Honkai: Star Rail	Anaxa		
2025	Wind Breaker: Furyō-tachi no Eiyūtan	Haruka Sakura		
2025	Super Robot Wars Y	Takuma Nagare, Hayate Immelmann, Onija		
2025	Dragon Quest I & II HD-2D Remake	Prince of Laurasia		
2026	Neverness to Everness	Esper Zero		

2021

- Pokémon Masters EX as Emmet

=== Commercials ===
- Room Aircon "Anata o Mi Mamoru Hen" (2019), Ga-kun
- Harry Potter: Wizards Unite (2019), Boy Protagonists (Japanese voice)
- Ano Hi no Kokoro o Toraete (2019), Ryuto (voice)
- 【Piccoma】Hotto, Hitokoma (2020)

=== Dubbing ===
Title	Role	Voice dub for	Notes	Source
Alien: Romulus	Andy	David Jonsson		
Avatar: The Way of Water	Miles "Spider" Socorro	Jack Champion		
Avatar: Fire and Ash	Miles "Spider" Socorro	Jack Champion		
Dessau Dancers	Alex	Oliver Konietzny		
F1	Hugh	Will Merrick		
Find Me in Paris	Jeff Chase	Castle Rock		
How to Train Your Dragon	Snotlout Jorgenson	Gabriel Howell		
The Mandalorian and Grogu	Rotta the Hutt	Jeremy Allen White		
Maurice	Alec Scudder	Rupert Graves	2019 Movie Plus edition	
The Odyssey	Sinon	Elliot Page		
Top Gun: Maverick	Mickey "Fanboy" Garcia	Danny Ramirez		
Your Friendly Neighborhood Spider-Man	Peter Parker / Spider-Man	Hudson Thames	Animation	
Zootopia 2	Zebro Zebraxton	Roman Reigns	Animation	

== Discography ==
=== Singles ===
List of singles, with selected chart positions
No.	Title	Single information	Oricon Chart peak positions	Album
1	"New World"	Released: May 30, 2018; Label: King Records; Catalog No.: KICM-91845 (limited), KICM-1845 (regular)	9	Horizon
2	"Before Dawn"	Released: September 19, 2018; Label: King Records; Catalog No.: KICM-91887 (limited), KICM-1887 (regular)	11	Horizon
3	"Speechless"	Released: May 8, 2019; Label: King Records; Catalog No.: KICM-91930 (limited), KICM-1930 (regular)	7	Horizon
4	"Rainbow"	Released: November 27, 2019; Label: King Records; Catalog No.: KICM-91989 (limited), KICM-1989 (regular)	8	
5	"Over"	Released: February 19, 2020; Label: King Records; Catalog No.: KICM-92028 (limited), KICM-2028 (regular)	9	
6	"Image"	Released: August 26, 2020; Label: King Records; Catalog No.: KICM-92059 (limited), KICM-2059 (regular)	18	
7	"SHAKE! SHAKE! SHAKE!"	Released: January 27, 2021; Label: King Records; Catalog No.: KICM-92075 (limited), KICM-2075 (regular)	6	
8	"Comin' Back"	Released: April 21, 2021; Label: King Records; Catalog No.: KICM-92085 (limited), KICM-2085 (regular)	12	

=== Album ===
List of albums, with selected chart positions
No.	Title	Single information	Oricon Chart Peak Position
1	Horizon	Released: July 24, 2019; Label: King Records; Catalog No.: KIZC-551 ~ 2 (CD + BD), KIZC-553 ~ 4 (CD + DVD), KICS-3838 (regular)	7
2	Equal	Released: September 22, 2021; Label: King Records; Catalog No.: KIZC-90631～2 (Limited Edition CD+BD), KIZC-633～4 (CD + BD), KICS-4021 (regular)	

== Concerts ==
=== Personal concerts ===
Date	Title	Venue	Source
October 6, 2019, November 3 and 17, 2019	YUMA UCHIDA 1st LIVE TOUR「OVER THE HORIZON」	Forest Hall; Namikiri Hall; Nakano Sunplaza	
February 24, 2020	YUMA UCHIDA 1st LIVE TOUR 「OVER THE HORIZON 〜& Over〜」	Pacifico Yokohama	
October 16–17, 2021	YUMA UCHIDA LIVE 2021「Equal Sign」	Makuhari Messe Hall	

=== Other concerts ===
Year	Title	Venue	Source
2018	KING SUPER LIVE 2018	Tokyo Dome	
2019	Animelo Summer Live 2019	Saitama Super Arena	

== Radio programs ==
- Uchida Yuma's Change You Mind (内田雄馬のChange You Mind, Uchida Yūma no Change You Mind, 2015)
- BELOVED MEMORIES (with Atsushi Tamaru) (2015-2020)
- Uchida Yuma: Let Me Grill Your Stories (内田雄馬 君の話を焼かせて Uchida Yūma Kimi no Hanashi o Yakasete, 2017–2021)
- Uchida Yuma: Heart Heat Hop (内田雄馬 Heart Heat Hop)

== Publications ==
=== Photobooks ===
- December 14, 2018. Uuuuma

=== Video ===
- March 1, 2017. Uchida Yūma no Koe Meshi 1 (『内田雄馬のこえめし』第1)
- December 1, 2017. Uchida Yūma no Koe Meshi 2 (『内田雄馬のこえめし』第2)
