= Naruto: Ultimate Ninja (video game) =

2003 video game

- Developer: CyberConnect2
- Publishers: JP: Bandai; NA/PAL: Namco Bandai Games (Note: Released under the Bandai brand name outside North America.)
- Composer: Chikayo Fukuda
- Series: Naruto: Ultimate Ninja
- Platform: PlayStation 2
- Release: JP: October 23, 2003; NA: June 26, 2006; AU: November 17, 2006; UK: February 9, 2007
- Genre: Fighting game
- Modes: Single-player, multiplayer

Naruto: Ultimate Ninja, known in Japan as Naruto: Narutimate Hero (NARUTO(ナルト) ナルティメットヒーロー, Naruto: Narutimetto Hīrō), is a 2003 fighting game developed by CyberConnect2 and published by Bandai for the PlayStation 2. It is the first installment of the Naruto: Ultimate Ninja series, and the first installment of the Hero series in Japan.

== Gameplay ==
There are special techniques and jutsus that can be used. Some characters feature the ability to activate special mode by inflicting the special techniques which enhances their status and gives them new abilities. It also features several items, like shuriken and kunai. There are many multi-layered stages from around the Naruto universe, including the Hidden Leaf Village, the Chunin Exam arena, and the Forest of Death. The game also uses support characters such as Naruto Uzumaki's support being Iruka, or Sasuke's support being Kakashi Hatake. The game features an arcade style story mode. Although the game loosely covers the events in the original manga from the Introduction arc up to the Invasion of Konoha arc, the game's twelve stories are meant to depict the events from different characters' perspectives and as the result some of them deviates from the original source (such as Neji being declared the winner in his fight with Naruto). Each stories consist of up to six battles divided by dialogues in a manga style display, one of many homages to its source material.

In the original Japanese version, there were only 12 characters (Naruto Uzumaki, Sasuke Uchiha, Sakura Haruno, Kakashi Hatake, Shikamaru Nara, Neji Hyūga, Rock Lee, Hinata Hyūga, Haku, Zabuza Momochi, Gaara, and Orochimaru). However, Namco Bandai has added the ability to separately select both the Nine-Tailed Naruto and Curse Mark Sasuke as bonus characters in the North American and European versions. As these characters were already available in the Japanese version as transformations (of Sasuke and Naruto respectively), both of these characters have lost the ability to transform into their stronger versions during battle. The original Japanese transformation would later serve as the ground up for the transformations in Naruto: Ultimate Ninja 3.

== Reception ==
Reception

Aggregate score
Aggregator	Score
Metacritic	75/100

Review scores
Publication	Score
1Up.com	B+
Eurogamer	7/10
Famitsu	30/40
Game Informer	6.5/10
GameDaily	(US) 9/10 (JP) 7/10
GameSpot	7.5/10
GameSpy	3/5 stars
GameTrailers	7.5/10
GameZone	7.7/10
Hardcore Gamer	3.75/5
IGN	7.5/10
Official U.S. PlayStation Magazine	4/5 stars
X-Play	3/5 stars
411Mania	5/10

The game received "generally favorable reviews" according to the review aggregation website Metacritic. In Japan, Famitsu gave it a score of one eight, two sevens, and one eight for a total of 30 out of 40. GamePro said, "If you're a fan of Naruto and his bizarre allies and enemies, Naruto: Ultimate Ninja will make you happy -- very happy. Besides finally making a debut on the PS2, this installment in the Naruto series offers up an enjoyable time whether you're playing by yourself or with someone else (the game supports two-players)." (Note: GamePro gave the game three 4/5 scores for graphics, control, and fun factor, and 3.75/5 for sound.)
