= Naruto Shippuden: Ultimate Ninja Storm 3 =

2013 video game

- Developer: CyberConnect2
- Publisher: Namco Bandai Games
- Composer: Chikayo Fukuda
- Series: Naruto: Ultimate Ninja
- Platforms: PlayStation 3 Xbox 360; Microsoft Windows; PlayStation 4 Xbox One; Nintendo Switch
- Release: March 5, 2013: PlayStation 3, Xbox 360; NA: March 5, 2013; EU: March 8, 2013; JP: April 18, 2013 Full Burst PlayStation 3, Xbox 360; NA: October 22, 2013; JP: October 24, 2013; EU: January 31, 2014 Microsoft Windows; WW: October 25, 2013 Trilogy PlayStation 4; JP: July 27, 2017; NA: August 25, 2017; EU: August 25, 2017 Xbox One; WW: August 25, 2017 Microsoft Windows; WW: August 25, 2017 Nintendo Switch; WW: April 26, 2018
- Genre: Fighting
- Modes: Single-player, multiplayer

Naruto Shippuden: Ultimate Ninja Storm 3, known in Japan as Naruto Shippūden: Narutimate Storm 3 (Japanese: NARUTO(ナルト) 疾風伝 ナルティメットストーム3, Hepburn: Naruto Shippūden: Narutimetto Sutōmu 3), the fourth installment of the Ultimate Ninja Storm series, is a fighting game developed by CyberConnect2 as part of the Naruto: Ultimate Ninja video-game series based on Masashi Kishimoto's Naruto manga. It was first released for PlayStation 3 and Xbox 360 by Namco Bandai Games in March 2013 in North America and in Europe, and in April 2013 in Japan.

The story focuses on the conflict between ninjas from all the villages and the terrorist organization known as Akatsuki as a world war starts between the groups. Its gameplay retains elements of Ultimate Ninja Storm 2 (such as quick time events), adding hack and slash scenarios and options to increase battle difficulty.

The game had positive reviews and good sales, surpassing its predecessors from the series. Critics praised the return of boss battles from Storm 2, the Ultimate Decision mechanics and improved graphics and controls. Reception of story-mode development, based on the number of cutscenes, was mixed. Lack of depth in the fighting mechanics and the under-use of hack and slash were criticized.

A re-release, Naruto Shippuden: Ultimate Ninja Storm 3 Full Burst was released on October 22 and 24, 2013 in North America and Japan, respectively. Its European version was released over three months later, on January 31, 2014.

A sequel, Naruto Shippuden: Ultimate Ninja Storm 4, was released in 2016. In 2017, CyberConnect2 re-released it again with the first two Storm games as a trilogy. The game was also released online that year.

== Gameplay ==
Sasuke Uchiha facing multiple enemies in a mob battle

The game has 80 playable characters and seven support characters (81 playable characters and seven support characters in Full Burst) The fighting system has been modified, with the Awakening Mode, giving each character enhanced abilities when their health is low and usable by certain characters during a fight. The item system was rearranged, so a player can choose between healing and offensive items. As the game progresses, the player can store items to use in combat.

Like the previous games, a player can choose two characters to assist the player character in battle. The assisting characters can aid the playable one with thirteen combos. In the team-attack system, a player can use support characters to charge and attack. The assistants have health bars, losing health when they are hit and becoming unusable when their health bars are depleted. If a player has one support character, they have ten health bars; if a player has two support characters, each has five health bars. Several arenas are interactive, making a player lose a fight if they leave an area.

Story mode is similar to Naruto Shippuden: Ultimate Ninja Storm 2 rather than the previous game, Naruto Shippuden: Ultimate Ninja Storm Generations; it features boss battles, including quick time events requiring strategy to defeat the opponent. Ultimate Decision Mode has the option of changing battle difficulties, with higher scores if greater difficulty is chosen.

The game has mob battles like Koei's Dynasty Warriors series, in which the player controls a character who must battle a series of enemies. In this mode, controls from regular fights are retained and the player can transport to another enemy after they defeat one.

== Plot ==
Ultimate Ninja Storm 3 begins with the flashback to the attack of the Nine-tailed Demon Fox on the Konohagakure ninja village while its former leader, Third Hokage Hiruzen Sarutobi, tries to stop it. The current leader of Konohagakure, Fourth Hokage Minato Namikaze, faces the masterminds behind the attack: Madara Uchiha and the fox. The story then moves to some time after Ultimate Ninja Storm 2's; the five leaders of the ninja village face Sasuke Uchiha, who intends to kill acting Hokage Danzo Shimura. Madara saves Sasuke and declares a ninja world war against the ninja forces. In the next chapter, Sasuke's former comrades from Konohagakure try to stop Sasuke until Naruto Uzumaki convinces him to have a death match. Naruto trains to control the Nine-Tailed Fox's chakra power with the help of Killer Bee, the Jinchuriki of the Eight-Tailed Ox-Octopus, and the spirit of his late mother, Kushina Uzumaki. The fourth ninja world war begins, with the ninja facing Madara's army of White Zetsu and Kabuto Yakushi's reanimated ninja. When Naruto and Killer Bee go to war, Kabuto revives the real Madara Uchiha and reveals that the "other Madara" Tobi is an imposter. While the five Kage make Madara retreat, Naruto defeats Tobi and his forces.

== Development ==
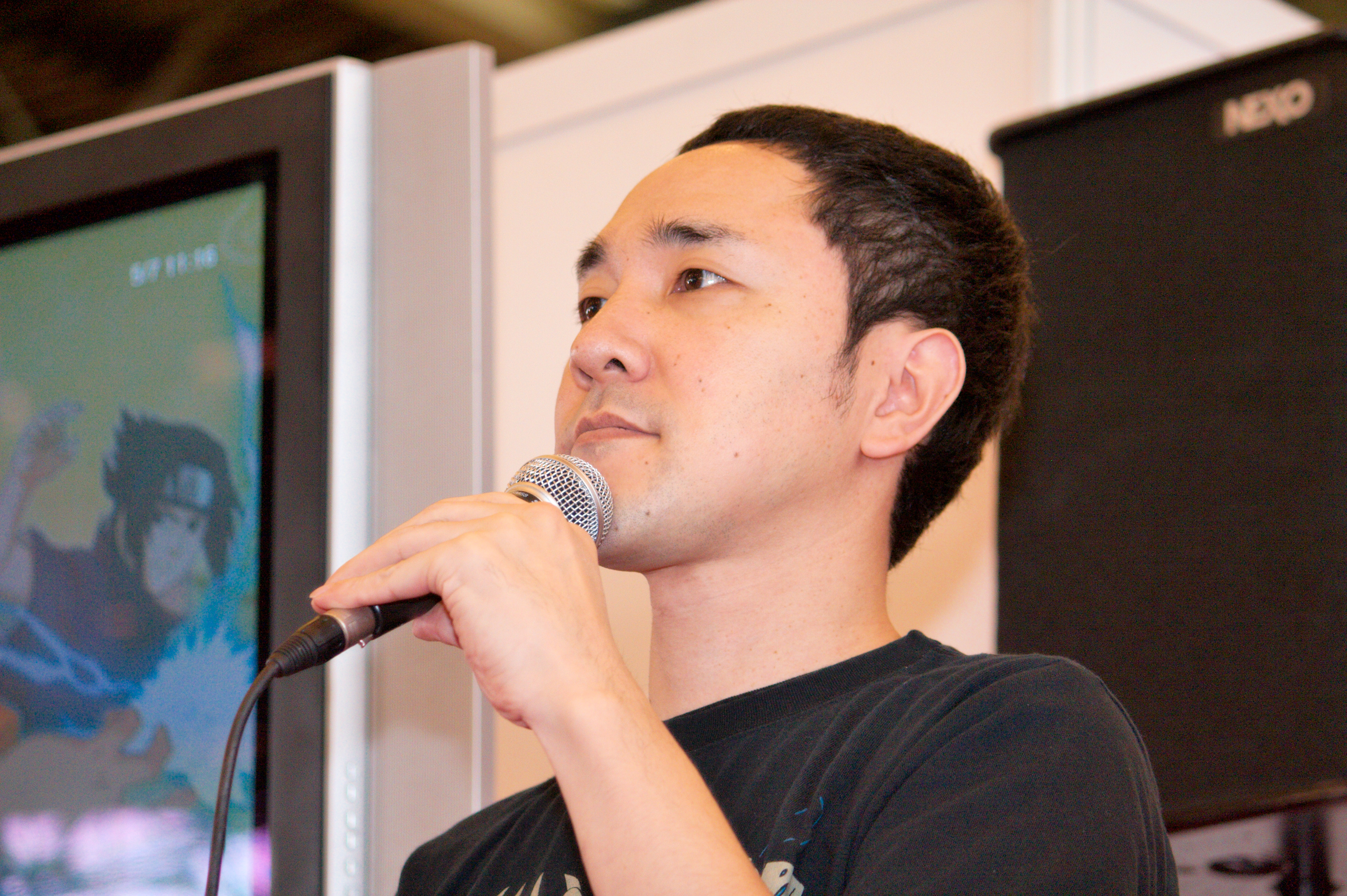
Hiroshi Matsuyama promised the return of the "epic boss battles".

The new Naruto game was first leaked online in the Weekly Shōnen Jump magazine in June 2012, with Namco Bandai Games confirming that it was Ultimate Ninja Storm 3 shortly afterwards. With the announcement, Yusuke Sasaki of Namco Bandai promised improvements to the fighting system and story mode. To make areas more interactive and add strategy to the fights, the staff added the ring-out option.

The story mode was developed to be accessible to players unfamiliar with the Naruto series. CyberConnect2 CEO Hiroshi Matsuyama promised the return of "epic boss battles" absent from Naruto Shippuden: Ultimate Ninja Storm Generations. Bandai promoted graphics improvements in its first trailer, released in July 2012. Two alternative costumes for Naruto Uzumaki (a samurai outfit and Goku's uniform from Dragon Ball) were based on illustrations by Masashi Kishimoto which were published in Shonen Jump and an art book. They attracted producer Yuki Nishikawa, who consulted other members of the company to include them in the game.

In August 2012, CyberConnect2 began a suggestion forum on their website which asked players worldwide to say what they wanted to see in Ultimate Ninja Storm 3 and upcoming Naruto games. The feedback was used to create the game. At San Diego Comic-Con in July 2012, Namco Bandai Games America representatives confirmed plans for a March 2013 release in North America. First-run copies of the game included a code to download six costumes: a Goku costume, a samurai suit for Naruto Uzumaki, Road to Ninja costumes for Hinata Hyuga and Sasuke Uchiha, a kimono for Sasuke, swimsuits for Sakura Haruno and Tsunade, a Japanese school uniform for Sakura, and ANBU costumes for Kakashi Hatake and Itachi Uchiha. The game was released in a regular form and in two limited editions which included action figures and the soundtrack.

Downloadable content is available for the game, a new addition to the series. All content released are new costumes for existing characters. Pre-orders for the game included a code to download the Goku's Turtle School uniform for Naruto Uzumaki. Players who subscribed to Weekly Shonen Jump or Neon Alley in North America received a code to download samurai costume for Naruto, a kimono for Sasuke Uchiha, a school uniform for Sakura Haruno, a swimsuit for Tsunade and an ANBU costume for Itachi Uchiha; these costumes were included with the Goku costume in Europe. On March 26, 2013, a School Uniform Pack was released in the North American and European PlayStation Store with school uniforms for Hinata Hyuga, Kakashi Hatake, Ino Yamanaka, Naruto, and Sasuke. Akatsuki straw hats for Deidara, Itachi, and Kisame Hoshigaki and a torn cloak for Pain were released on April 2, 2013, as part of the Akatsuki Hats Pack. Five costumes for Naruto and one for Sasuke were released on April 9, 2013, each based on traditional clothing from cultures around the world. New costumes for Hinata, Jiraiya, Kakashi, Madara Uchiha, Orochimaru, Sasuke, Yamato, and Tsunade were made available for download on April 16, 2013, some of which were from the ninth Naruto film (Road to Ninja: Naruto the Movie). On April 23, 2013, a Hello Kitty-inspired costume for Sakura and a Swimsuit Pack with swimsuits for Hinata, Ino, Sakura, and Temari were released. The final DLC for North America and Europe (the Kage Hats Pack) was released on April 30, 2013, with kage hats for Danzo Shimura, Gaara, Mizukage, Raikage, and Tsuchikage. Most costumes released in bundles in North America and Europe are available for purchase at the Japanese PlayStation Store.

== Naruto Shippuden: Ultimate Ninja Storm 3 Full Burst ==
A comparison of Storm 3's original graphics with its Full Burst version

On July 4, 2013, Namco Bandai Games Europe announced Naruto Shippuden: Ultimate Ninja Storm 3 Full Burst, available in a retail pack or downloadable add-on and with support for PC. CyberConnect2 called it a "director's cut" version of the original Storm 3. The game has a number of additions, including enhanced cinematics, all previously released DLC costumes (with the exceptions of Naruto's Goku costume and Sakura's Hello Kitty costume), more missions and one playable character, and an additional chapter in story mode. It was released on October 22, 2013 (October 25, 2013 for PC via Steam) in North America, on October 24, 2013, for PS3 and Xbox 360 in Japan, and on January 31, 2014 (October 25, 2013 for PC via Steam) in Europe. Full Burst scored 80 out of 100 on Metacritic. Vandal praised Full Burst's improvements, notably the boss fight between the Uchiha brothers and Kabuto. Worthplaying found the new missions and online features appealing, but thought that only Naruto fans would buy it.

== Reception ==
Reception

Aggregate score
Aggregator	Score
Metacritic	PS3: 77/100; X360: 70/100 (Full Burst) PS3: 73/100 (Full Burst) X360: 66/100 (Full Burst) PC: 80/100

Review scores
Publication	Score
Destructoid	8
GameSpot	6/10
GamesRadar+	4/5
GameTrailers	5.3/10
IGN	8.6/10
Gaming Union	8/10
Gaming Age	B

Storm 3 sold 87,661 units in its opening week, surpassing the initial sales of its predecessors. The game sold one million copies in North America and Europe by May 2013. Over two million copies of Naruto Shippuden: Ultimate Ninja Storm 3 Full Burst were shipped worldwide by August 28, 2014; it sold one million copies in North America, 750,000 copies in Europe, and 250,000 copies in Japan.

The game has been well-received, with an average score of 77/100 on Metacritic for the PlayStation 3 version and average of 70/100 for Xbox 360 version. IGN praised its improvements over its predecessors in gameplay and story-mode action scenes. Its cinematic boss battles were praised, particularly those exploring the series' background. Its story presentation was contrasted with its predecessor, Storm 2. Despite finding Storm 3's plot inferior to Storm 2, Destructoid still found it one of the best anime-based games based on its graphics and fights. Other sites had mixed responses, due to the amount of dialogue and length of cutscenes. GameTrailers felt that the exposition and lack of visual appeal made Storm 3 fail to show the manga and anime's appeal; its fighting system was simplistic and its soundtrack unsuitable. However, Play called it the best Naruto game ever released.

The addition of Decision Mode was well-received, since it could increase the game's difficulty. Noting that newcomers might not understand the game's plot, retellings might make it easier to grasp. Gaming Age appreciated the graphics and cast, saying that it surpassed Level-5's Ni no Kuni. Although hack and slash was more entertaining than Ultimate Ninja Impact's, its scarcity was criticized. Despite the number of characters, the combat's technical depth was also criticized. Gaming Union found the story's presentation similar to Storm 2, with limited exploration and few side quests.

According to the Siliconera website, many players wanted to control the reanimated Kages which debuted in Storm 3 as enemies but CyberConnect2 focused on Sage Kabuto Yakushi in Full Burst. A sequel, Naruto Shippuden: Ultimate Ninja Storm 4, was released in early 2016. Bandai Namco released Naruto Shippuden: Ultimate Ninja Storm Legacy, which contains Storm 3 Full Burst, on August 25, 2017. Storm 2, its prequel and sequels were released online at the same time.
