= Naruto: Ultimate Ninja 3 =

2005 video game

- Developer: CyberConnect2
- Publishers: JP: Bandai; NA/PAL: Namco Bandai Games
- Composer: Chikayo Fukuda
- Series: Naruto: Ultimate Ninja
- Platform: PlayStation 2
- Release: JP: December 22, 2005; NA: March 25, 2008; EU: September 5, 2008; AU: September 12, 2008
- Genre: Fighting game
- Modes: Single-player, multiplayer

Naruto Ultimate Ninja 3, known as in Japan as Naruto: Narutimate Hero 3 (NARUTO(ナルト) ナルティメットヒーロー3, Naruto: Narutimetto Hīrō 3), is the third installment of the fighting game series Naruto: Ultimate Ninja and the third and final installment of the Hero series in Japan. It was developed by CyberConnect2 and published by Bandai.

== Gameplay ==
The game features the largest character roster upon release, and third largest roster in the Ultimate Ninja series, with 42 characters, and covers the events up to episode 135 in the anime. The player can use equippable jutsu, a trend that began in the second game, and for the first time, equippable Ultimate Jutsu. When two jutsus of the same strength clash, the game cuts to a jutsu clash, in which the player or players must rapidly press a specific button repeatedly, until either jutsu wins out over the other. In this installment, the player is to both induce temporary transformations (such as Sasuke's Curse Mark, and Rock Lee's Eight inner gates) through Ultimate Jutsu, and other, more permanent ones, that last the entire rest of the fight (like Nine-Tailed Naruto or the Second State Curse Mark). The game also heavily expands on the previous game's RPG mode, and is the first in the series to use CGI cutscenes. The player also has the ability to summon other characters through the use of Ultimate Jutsu, such as Gamabunta. However, support characters have been removed and the game restricts the player to use only one Ultimate Jutsu for each battle instead of the usual preset three (though they can be changed before battle).

Additionally, the Japanese version comes with a bonus DVD that includes a special 26-minute anime OVA. It features many characters from the series, both living and dead, making it a non-canon release. The basic plot centers around a Battle Royale tournament, providing players with hints to be used in the RPG mode contained in the game.

== Reception ==
Reception

Aggregate score
Aggregator	Score
Metacritic	75/100

Review scores
Publication	Score
1Up.com	B
Famitsu	34/40
GameDaily	7/10
GameRevolution	B
GameSpot	7.5/10
GamesRadar+	3.5/5 stars
GameTrailers	8.2/10
GameZone	8/10
IGN	7.6/10
PlayStation: The Official Magazine	4/5 stars

The game received "generally favorable reviews" according to the review aggregation website Metacritic. In Japan, Famitsu gave it a score of two nines and two eights for a total of 34 out of 40. GamePro said of the game, "Regardless of its flaws, the depth of Naruto: Ultimate Ninja 3 gives fans good reason to dust off their PS2s and jump around." (Note: GamePro gave the game 4/5 scores for graphics, sound, control, and fun factor.)
