= Naruto Shippuden: Ultimate Ninja Storm Generations =

2012 video game

- European box art
- Developer: CyberConnect2
- Publisher: Namco Bandai Games
- Producer: Yusuke Sasaki
- Composer: Chikayo Fukuda
- Series: Naruto: Ultimate Ninja
- Platforms: PlayStation 3, Xbox 360,
- Release: February 23, 2012: JP: February 23, 2012; NA: March 13, 2012; AU: March 29, 2012; EU: March 30, 2012
- Genre: Fighting
- Modes: Single-player, multiplayer

Naruto Shippuden: Ultimate Ninja Storm Generations, known in Japan as Naruto Shippuden: Narutimate Storm Generation (NARUTO(ナルト) 疾風伝 ナルティメットストーム ジェネレーション, Naruto Shippūden: Narutimetto Sutōmu Jenerēshon) is the third installment of the Ultimate Ninja Storm series, is a video game in the Naruto: Ultimate Ninja fighting game series, developed by CyberConnect2 and published by Namco Bandai Games. It is based on the Naruto manga series by Masashi Kishimoto. First revealed in June 2011, it was first released in Japan on February 23, 2012, on the PlayStation 3 and Xbox 360 consoles and on March 13 in North America, in Europe on March 30 and Australia on March 29, 2012.

This title features both characters from the previous installments Naruto: Ultimate Ninja Storm and Naruto Shippuden: Ultimate Ninja Storm 2, thus featuring two incarnations from characters who noticeably changed across the series, alongside the newly introduced. The gameplay from its predecessors has been modified for faster battles while interaction between players was improved through a series of collectible cards that allows them to compete between each other to obtain new content. Additionally, the game shows original storylines produced by the group in charge of Naruto's animated adaptations, Studio Pierrot. The game has been well received by video game publications and has sold over a million units worldwide as of July 2012.

== Gameplay ==
Naruto Uzumaki attacks Sasuke Uchiha in one of his Awakening Modes, available for character with 50% or less of health remaining. This Awakening Mode makes Naruto turn into his Tailed Beast Chakra Mode.

While carrying several elements previously seen in the previous installments, such as playing the story mode and online tournaments, the game sees several new features and changes and 72 characters and 15 support only characters. The battle system has been modified for faster gameplay. The game now implements a new status meter that limits the number of techniques required to avoid the opponent's moves. One of the new additions to the game is the "Beast Mode", also known as "Awakening Mode", in which a character transforms into a beast with stronger attacks should they be about to be defeated. For example, Part II Naruto Uzumaki changes into his Tailed Beast Chakra Mode that enhances his abilities, while Part II Sasuke Uchiha summons Susanoo, a massive ethereal warrior that aids him in combat. Players are also able to use real collectible cards to unlock new content and gain advantages in the fights.

The story mode covers both Part I and Part II from the series, respectively featuring the younger and older incarnations from the series' characters. The role-playing game elements from Naruto Shippuden: Ultimate Ninja Storm 2's story mode were removed in favor of consecutive battles, thus reducing the time spent during the mode. Although it mainly focuses on Naruto Uzumaki's adventures based on the series, it features new sidestories led by other supporting characters that expand their backgrounds. New animated cutscenes are used for the story mode. The game includes the debut of the new Kage, the strongest ninjas from the Naruto series, introduced in Part II, as well as Kakashi Hatake's team during his childhood. Assistant character are exclusively teaming up with playable characters such as Fu and Torune who are teamed up with Danzo Shimura.

== Development ==
Naruto Shippuden: Ultimate Ninja Storm Generations was first announced by Namco Bandai Games in late June from 2011 in the manga magazine Weekly Shōnen Jump, promising the return of Part I characters, most notably Zabuza Momochi and Haku in response to their popularity within fans. With the addition of these characters, the staff comments the game would have a wider variety of battles than the previous game. Adding the Part I versions of the characters proved to be difficult as they were required to fit with the cast from Ultimate Ninja Storm 2. Kiba Inuzuka's Part I version was the hardest character to design as in its original his gameplay using Akamaru that moved regardless of Kiba's moves. The initial gameplay was modified during November 2011 to further balance the fights. The game's official website opened shortly afterwards. Producer Yusuke Sasaki commented the staff wanted to give combat a greater focus than its predecessors. The term "Generations" was used, standing for "the ultimate ninja battle that crosses generations."

The game is meant to satisfy the gamers' wishes and interests regarding the series according to Hiroshi Matsuyama, the president of CyberConnect2. Matsuyama also commented that the story mode is different from Naruto Shippuden: Ultimate Ninja Storm 2, with Part II meant to have a different impact on the gamers. The boss battles from such game were also removed to make the game look more like a fighting game. Studio Pierrot, the developer of the Naruto and Naruto: Shippuden anime series, aided CyberConnect2 in the making of new storylines to be featured in the game, resulting in new 60 minutes of created animation. Although by the time game was released, a new story arc from the manga had started, the staff decided not to include it in the game to avoid creating an ending that was not part of the series. Instead they wished to include substories that would help to develop certain events from Naruto.

=== Promotion and release ===
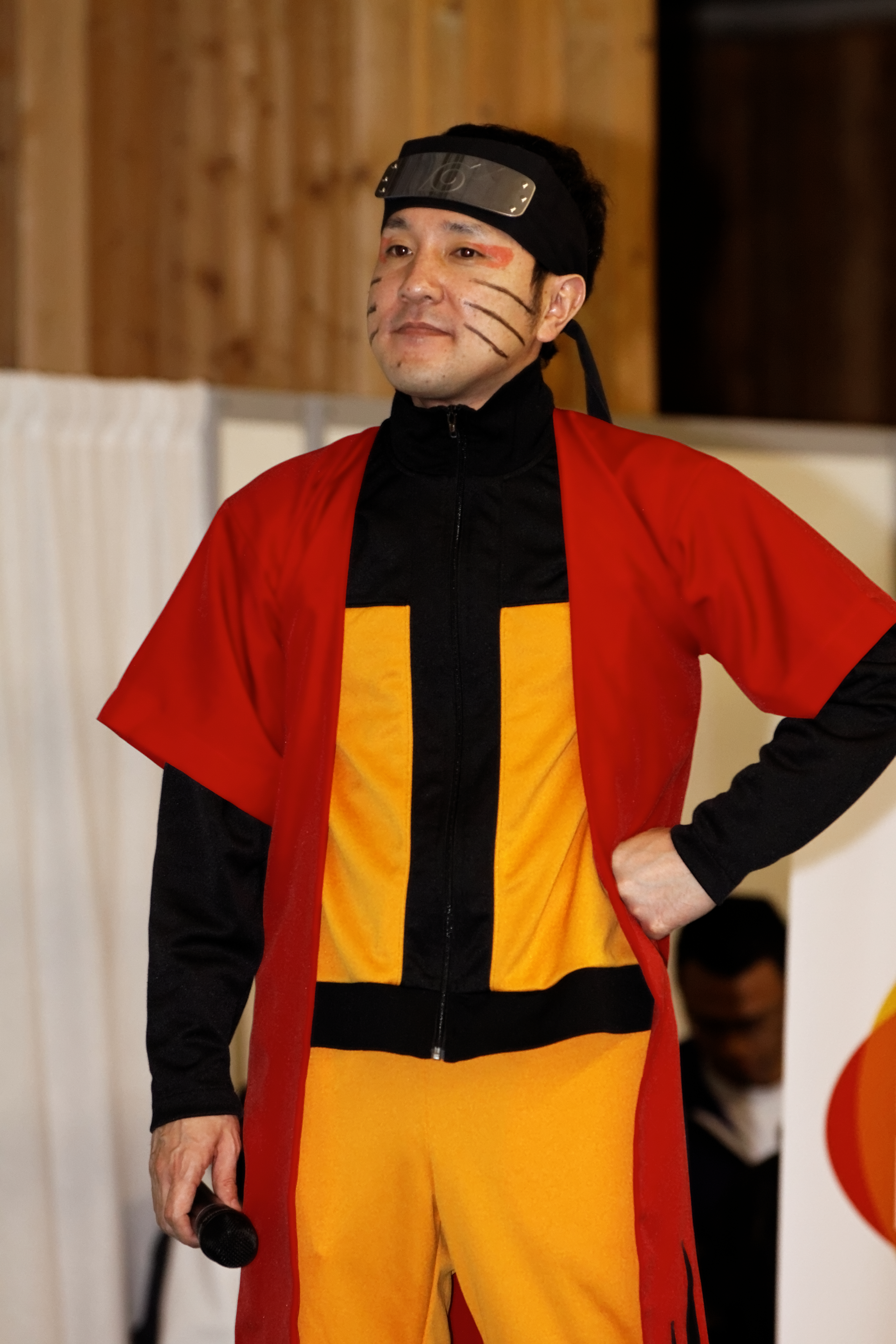
In order to promote Generations, Hiroshi Matsuyama cosplayed as Naruto Uzumaki for a marathon.

In November 2011, Namco Bandai announced the game would be released in Japan on February 23, 2012. Pre-orders included a CD soundtrack from the game and the previous installments, Ultimate Ninja Storm and Ultimate Ninja Storm 2, under the title of Ultimate Ninja Storm Best Sound (ナルティメットストームBestSound) composed by Chikayo Fukuda. Additionally, during following dates, the game was announced to be released in North America and Europe on March 13, 2012, and March 30, 2012, respectively, also by Namco Bandai. Besides the regular game, Namco Bandai Europe also released a limited "Card Edition" that comes with a starter deck from 'Naruto's collectible card game, a booster pack, and message from Masashi Kishimoto. Like the Japanese version, the European port includes a CD soundtrack, promoting "the first official rap single of Killer Bee". Besides trailers focused on the game's system, there have been also several characters focused trailers showing their roles in the story mode. Moreover, in February 2012 Namco Bandai released a trailer focusing on Killer Bee's music video. Namco Bandai also requested fans to send video responses singing alongside the video.

A free downloadable demo of the game was released on the Japanese PlayStation Network on January 24, 2012. Such announcement from the Weekly Shōnen Jump also came with the inclusion of more playable characters including Gaara, Kankuro, Temari in both Part I and Part II forms, as well as Chiyo. A demo for the English PlayStation Network and the Xbox Live was released on February 29, 2012.

On March 18, 2012, Namco Bandai made the panel "Namco Bandai Games Celebrates Naruto Shippuden: Ultimate Ninja Storm Generations" based on the game's release in the WonderCon 2012. Hiroshi Matsuyama also attended the panel and answered to the fans' questions. Matsuyama also participated in the 2012 Paris Marathon while cosplaying as Naruto to celebrating the release of the new video game.

== Reception ==
Reception

Aggregate score
| Aggregator | Score |
|---|---|
| Metacritic | (X360) 74/100 (PS3) 74/100 |

Review scores
| Publication | Score |
|---|---|
| Destructoid | 6.5/10 |
| Electronic Gaming Monthly | 7.5/10 |
| Famitsu | 36/40 |
| Game Informer | 7.25/10 |
| GameRevolution | 3/5 |
| GameSpot | 7/10 |
| IGN | 8.5/10 |
| Official Xbox Magazine (UK) | 6/10 |
| Official Xbox Magazine (US) | 6.5/10 |
| PlayStation: The Official Magazine | 6/10 |
| The Digital Fix | 7/10 |

During its first week of release in Japan, the PlayStation 3 version of Ultimate Ninja Storm Generations sold 65,758 units, becoming the third bestselling title during its weekly sales chart. As of July 2012, over one million copies have been sold worldwide with 420,000 units for North America, 420,000 units for Europe and 160,000 units for Asia.

Reviews ranged from positive to average. The game has a Metacritic score of 74 out of 100 for both console versions. It was given a score of 36 out of 40 by the Japanese magazine Famitsu based on four reviewers, who gave it all nines. It was also well received by IGN, who praised how the Ultimate Ninja Storm subseries was developed, commenting on improvements in the gameplay and the new storylines that improved the series' plot.
