= Final Fantasy VII G-Bike =

2014 mobile racing game

- Promotional artwork for Final Fantasy VII G-Bike featuring Cloud Strife.
- Developer: CyberConnect2
- Publisher: Square Enix
- Director: Hiroshi Matsuyama
- Producers: Ichiro Hazama; Shinji Hashimoto
- Series: Final Fantasy
- Platforms: iOS, Android
- Release: October 30, 2014
- Genres: Racing, hack and slash
- Mode: Single-player

Final Fantasy VII G-Bike (Note: Japanese: ファイナルファンタジーVII Gバイク, Hepburn: Fainaru Fantajī Sebun G Baiku) was a free-to-play video game for Android and iOS platforms. Available between October 2014 and December 2015, the title was a racing game with role-playing elements. Based on Square Enix's role-playing game Final Fantasy VII, the player controlled the protagonist of that game, Cloud Strife. While riding on a motorcycle, Cloud battled enemies with melee weapons and magic with help from other Final Fantasy VII characters. Players could modify Cloud's weapons, clothing, and motorcycle, and perform powerful attacks known as limit breaks.

Square Enix and developer CyberConnect2 conceived of the game as a series of titles for mobile devices that would see the Final Fantasy VII mini-games remade. In the development process, they settled on only the most popular title, G-Bike. Developers expanded on the original idea for the mini-game in areas such as customization and gameplay but did not add an overarching story.

Critics had mixed reactions due to it not being the remake of the original Final Fantasy VII for which fans had been hoping, but they still found the game visually appealing and faithful to the original mini-games aesthetic.

== Gameplay ==
G-Bike gameplay shows Cloud using lightning-based magic to attack enemies.

Final Fantasy VII G-Bike was a free-to-play racing game involving Cloud Strife, a young mercenary and protagonist of Final Fantasy VII. The game involved Cloud riding a motorcycle while fighting enemies as he travelled the roads around the city of Midgar as well as other locations. Besides attacking with his weapon called the "Buster Sword", Cloud could perform magic with items called "Materia". He was capable of performing a series of powerful attacks known as "Limit Breaks". Players could summon supporting characters from the original Final Fantasy VII such as Tifa Lockhart. Bosses drawn from FFVII are encountered at the end of stages, including Reno and Dyne. Players were awarded a ranking at the end of each stage based on how well they did.

Players could customize Cloud's weaponry and clothing to resemble either his original Final Fantasy VII look or a new look by visiting shops in-between missions. Players could customize their bikes as well as purchase new ones. In a 2015 event, players were able to replace Cloud's Hardy Daytona bike with one called Phoenix, which was more powerful and gave a boost to the characters' magical powers.

== Development and release ==
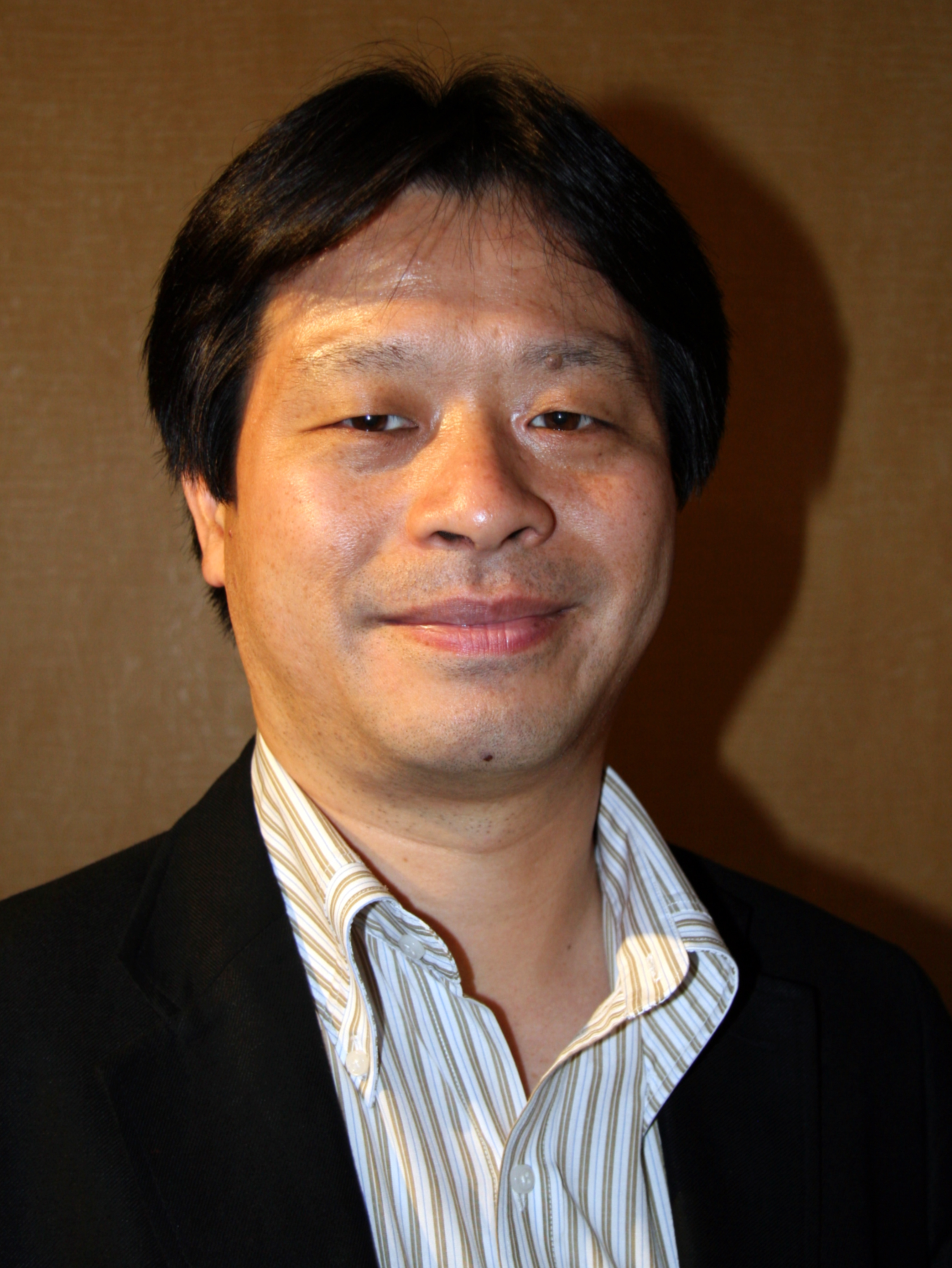
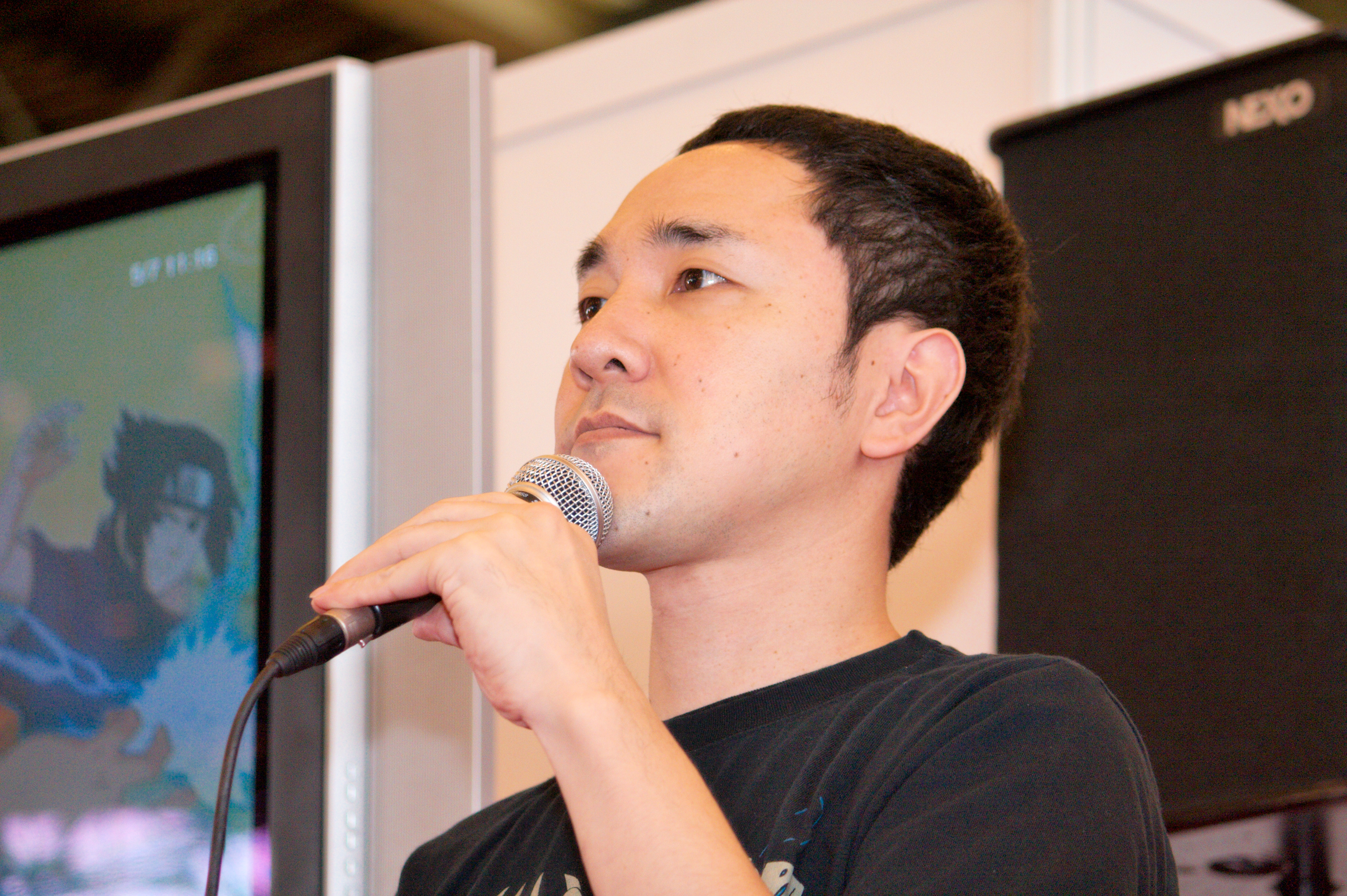
Yoshinori Kitase from Square Enix oversaw director Hiroshi Matsuyama's work.

The idea to create a mobile game based on Final Fantasy VII came from Square Enix producer Ichiro Hazama. He suggested partnering with a company known for action games. For this reason, Square Enix chose developer CyberConnect2 to make the game. They chose them because the developer company's staff had a close relationship with character designer Tetsuya Nomura, who worked with them on earlier projects. Square Enix designated Hiroshi Matsuyama of CyberConnect2 as the game's director with oversight by Square Enix executive producer Yoshinori Kitase. Nomura became the creative director, and in this role, he created a new design for Cloud Strife.

The initial plans were for G-Bike to be the first in a series of mobile games based on the minigames of Final Fantasy VII. Of the title's several minigames, G-Bike was decided upon because of its popularity. In order to expand upon it, new gameplay was developed, such as weapon modifications and new forms of combat. The team decided not to develop an elaborate story around the game because it would necessitate more playable characters. For this reason, Cloud is the only protagonist in G-Bike. Besides the original minigame, another inspiration for G-Bike's development was the 2005 film Final Fantasy VII: Advent Children. In that film, Cloud fights enemies while driving a vehicle named Fenrir, which Hazama thought was "very cool, and radical", and influences from the title went into the game. During production, CyberConnect2 was given access to production assets from both Advent Children and Crisis Core by Square Enix. That way, the developers' aesthetic matched the software publishers' previous works. Matsumaya described the early submission and evaluation processes with Square Enix's newly-established game screening department as "bumpy".

G-Bike was announced in June 2014 by Square Enix. After some initial confusion, Hazama cleared up misconceptions that the game was going to be Final Fantasy VII and stated that it would be its own game. Moreover, while it shared aesthetics with Final Fantasy VII and spin-off series Compilation of Final Fantasy VII, Square Enix said that the titles are not connected. Matsuyama revealed that he asked Square Enix producer Shinji Hashimoto if he was interested in a Final Fantasy VII remake, but Hashimoto was not. Matsuyama interjected, "Well, if G-Bike is released and becomes a hit, let's make a Final Fantasy VII [remake]".

Square Enix released the game's first trailer in September 2014. Players who registered early for the game received a "Comet Materia" in-game item as a bonus. G-Bike was released in Japan on October 30. The game was released for free with in-app purchases. At release, G-Bike had problems downloading to players' devices. While technically available, a glitch disrupted the games service until November 1. Square Enix initially stated that they will release the game in Western regions, but they later canceled it for unspecified reasons. Pocky maker Glico launched a special event to promote the game, and created collectible cards for the occasion. G-Bike was shut down by Square Enix in December 2015.

== Reception ==
G-Bike received mixed reviews from critics. Japanese website AppGet praised the title as a quality remaking of the original minigame and its original aesthetic. Ishaan Sahdev of Siliconera praised the game for its graphics, which he called "gorgeous". Toshi Nakamura of Kotaku was optimistic about the game's announcement and thought the game's trailer looked appealing. He believed that it could lead to the release of other possible remakes from Square Enix. Kyle Hilliard of Game Informer concluded that fans would not be upset that Square Enix announced G-Bike's release instead of Final Fantasy VII Remake.

Some critics were displeased and bewildered by the game's announcement. Jason Schreier of Kotaku claimed that the initial public reaction was general surprise upon hearing Square Enix was announcing a new minigame. Mike Wehner of Engadget pronounced that people would be disappointed that Square Enix was not ready with the Final Fantasy VII Remake. Nikola Suprak of Hardcore Gamer went so far as to call the developers "trolls" for even working on a minigame with the main Final Fantasy remake unfinished. Hidetsugu Naya of AppGet had more typical criticisms and noted the frequent load times and the many hours of gameplay required to unlock supporting characters. In retrospect, Kat Bailey of USGamer said that because Square Enix has not localized the game into English, the title would stay obscure as most players will never hear about it.
