= Naruto X Boruto: Ultimate Ninja Storm Connections =

2023 video game

Naruto x Boruto: Ultimate Ninja Storm Connections is an action-fighting game developed by CyberConnect2 and published by Bandai Namco Entertainment to mark the 20^{th} anniversary celebration of Naruto anime. It was released on 17 November 2023 across several platforms including on Microsoft Windows (via Steam), PlayStation 4 and 5, Nintendo Switch, Xbox Series X and Series S, and Xbox One. This edition combines iconic moments from the entire previous series with new characters and original story.

== History ==
Naruto x Boruto: Ultimate Ninja Storm Connections was designed by CyberConnect2 and published digitally by Bandai Namco Entertainment on 17 November 2023 marking the 20^{th} anniversary of the Naruto anime. It is the seventh and final edition of the Naruto Ultimate Ninja Storm series influenced by Masashi Kishimoto’s Naruto manga. Released on PlayStation 4 and 5, Microsoft Windows (via Steam), Xbox Series X and Series S, Xbox One and Nintendo Switch, it combines new characters and original story with the features in the previous editions including Naruto Shippuden: Ultimate Ninja Storm 4 which has Boruto content released in 2016. The game’s first DLC featuring Hagoromo Otsutsuki was announced on 16 January 2024 and on 21 March same year, the second DLC featuring Isshiki Otsutsuki was confirmed. The game was updated to version 1.30 introducing Kurenai Yuhi and downloadable content alongside other improvements.

== Gameplay ==
The game has the 3D arena-fighting style of the previous series with noticeable mechanical changes that speed up combat and increase accessibility. It has the largest roster of more than 130 playable characters combining previous characters and new ones such as Ashura and Indra Otsutsuki, and Boruto characters like Kawaki and Jigen. It has two story modes: History Mode – focusing on the rivalry between Naruto and Sasuke from beginning of the series to the final battle and Special Story Mode – an original storyline focused on Boruto Uzumaki who is entangled a Fifth Great Ninja War via an online game – Ninja Heroes.

Its simple control mode allows players to perform complicated ninjutsu combos and dashes with single button presses that makes it easily accessible for new players. Unlike the previous series, this version allows every character to use two different ninjutsu during battle replacing “tilt” mechanic in the previous games. Players have access to a total of six different ninjutsu in a single match.
