= Naruto: Ultimate Ninja Storm =

2008 video game

- Developer: CyberConnect2
- Publisher: Namco Bandai Games
- Composers: Chikayo Fukuda; Yasunori Ebina
- Series: Naruto: Ultimate Ninja
- Platforms: PlayStation 3 PlayStation 4 Windows; Xbox One; Nintendo Switch; Android iOS macOS tvOS
- Release: November 4, 2008: PlayStation 3; NA: November 4, 2008; EU: November 7, 2008; AU: November 20, 2008; JP: January 15, 2009 Trilogy PlayStation 4; JP: July 27, 2017; WW: August 25, 2017 Windows & Xbox One; WW: August 25, 2017 Nintendo Switch; WW: April 26, 2018 Android, iOS; WW: September 25, 2024 macOS, tvOS; WW: December 4, 2025
- Genre: Fighting
- Modes: Single-player, multiplayer

Naruto: Ultimate Ninja Storm, known in Japan as Naruto: Narutimate Storm is a 2008 fighting video game developed by CyberConnect2 and published by Namco Bandai Games (now Bandai Namco Entertainment). It is based on the popular manga and anime series Naruto by Masashi Kishimoto, and the first installment of the Naruto: Ultimate Ninja Storm series, followed up by Naruto Shippuden: Ultimate Ninja Storm 2 (2010). The game has since been remastered and released as part of the series Trilogy on newer platforms in 2017, as well as mobile platforms in 2024.

== Gameplay ==
Naruto: Ultimate Ninja Storm retains many of the gameplay elements from earlier installments of the Ultimate Ninja series. However, Ultimate Ninja Storm allows players to fight in three-dimensional environments, as opposed to the two-dimensional planes in previous games. The other games were much like Street Fighter II (a 2D fighting game that emerged in the 1990s), mainly because of the lack of plot and mostly made for the fighting aspect.

One of the new features introduced to the series in Ultimate Ninja Storm is "Awakening Mode", a transformation that can be activated when a player loses a certain amount of health during a match. The health requirement for each character differs based on how powerful the transformation is. Once activated, the character gains new abilities, speed, and stronger attacks. A few of the characters in the game gain entirely new movesets after transforming. With the d-pad, players can use preset items during a match that either damage the opponent or provide various status effects like increasing attack power, or lowering the opponent's defense. Players are also able to customize their character's jutsu and select two support characters to use in a match. Returning to the game from previous installments is "jutsu clash" mode, which is initiated if both players activate their special attack at the same time. During this mode, both players have to press the corresponding button as fast as possible in order to knock away their opponent. Each character has an "ultimate jutsu". If it hits, both players either input button commands, mash a certain button, or spin the analogue stick the fastest during the time limit. If the attacking player wins, the ultimate will hit, typically taking away around a third to a full bar of the opponent's health. If the defending player wins, they will escape without major damage. Each character also has an "ultimate impact", where if the player holds down the melee button, the character controlled will charge up a very powerful strike. If it hits, it zooms in on the opponent's face taking a heavy blow in a short, cinematic close-up.

The game includes 25 playable characters, each of which can also be used as a support character during battle. Ten additional support-only characters are available as free downloadable content released over the five-month period that followed the game's release. Additional downloadable content include alternative costumes, and new missions.

The story mode loosely covers the events of the Part I of the manga and the anime. Players are able to explore the Hidden Leaf Village between missions, which acts as a central hub for the story mode, and access more missions.

== Development ==
The game was first unveiled in September 2007, under the code name Naruto PS3 Project. Namco Bandai said the title would start with "Naruto: Ultimate Ninja" and asked fans for suggestions on a suffix consisting of one or two words. In April 2008 the game was officially named Naruto: Ultimate Ninja Storm, in addition, the developers allowed fans to choose the final front cover for the game out of a possible six.

The game features cel-shaded graphics that "will break the barrier between anime and video game". Hiroshi Matsuyama, one of the creators of the game, commented that the staff wanted to try to remove the borderline between the anime and actual gameplay. They wanted to reach an effect where people actually look at the scenes as anime rather than a game. The core concept of the game is that of a one on one battle. Though the storyline from the game is based on the first part of the anime series and the manga, the producers picked out key areas within the story, effectively forming a line from the first to the 135th episode.

A playable demo of the game was released on Sony's PlayStation Network on July 17, 2008. Only Naruto Uzumaki and Kakashi Hatake were playable and only one stage was included. The official North American release date of the game was confirmed in a trailer shown during the 2008 Tokyo Game Show.

== Releases ==
A limited-edition version of Ultimate Ninja Storm was available to those who pre-ordered the game at select retailers. It included a steel book case with an alternate art plastic slip cover, two exclusive cards for the Naruto collectible card game, a CD of the game's soundtrack, and an individually numbered "Laser Cel" depicting Naruto Uzumaki and Sasuke Uchiha. The game was first released in North America on November 4, 2008, in Europe, on November 7, 2008, and in Australia on November 20, 2008. The Japanese version of the game was released on January 15, 2009, under the name of Naruto: Narutimate Storm (NARUTO－ナルト－ナルティメットストーム, Naruto: Narutimetto Sutōmu).

A remastered version of the game was released in Naruto: Ultimate Ninja Storm Trilogy alongside Ninja Storm 2 and Ninja Storm 3 Full Burst for the PlayStation 4, Windows, and Xbox One on August 25, 2017, and was released for Nintendo Switch on April 26, 2018. A mobile version was released on September 24, 2024.

== Reception ==
Reception

Aggregate score
Aggregator	Score
Metacritic	75/100

Review scores
Publication	Score
1Up.com	B−
GameRevolution	C
GameSpot	7.5/10
GamesRadar+	3.5/5
GameTrailers	7.5/10
GameZone	8.5/10
IGN	8.4/10
PlayStation Official Magazine – UK	5/10
PlayStation: The Official Magazine	4/5
X-Play	3/5

Naruto: Ultimate Ninja Storm received "generally positive" reception, according to review aggregator Metacritic.

IGN gave the game an 8.4 out of 10, praising it for its "phenomenal visuals" and the variety of things that can be done between missions. It noted that the single-button combat might turn away hardcore gamers, but found the fast-paced action and chakra management system to be redeeming factors. GameSpot gave the game a score of 7.5 out of ten saying it wasn't a bad game but it wasn't a great one either. 1UP.com gave it a B− and praised the game's graphics, but commented that some parts of the game system have issues.

As of July 2009, 83,868 units have been sold in Japan. It was the only video game to win the Excellence Prize in the Entertainment Division of the 13th annual Japan Media Arts Festival. As of 2016, the game has sold over two million copies.
