= Naruto Shippuden: Ultimate Ninja Storm 2 =

2010 video game

- Cover art featuring Sasuke Uchiha (left) and Naruto Uzumaki (right)
- Developer: CyberConnect2
- Publisher: Namco Bandai Games
- Director: Hiroshi Matsuyama
- Composer: Chikayo Fukuda
- Series: Naruto: Ultimate Ninja
- Platforms: PlayStation 3 Xbox 360; Microsoft Windows; PlayStation 4 Xbox One; Nintendo Switch
- Release: October 15, 2010: PlayStation 3, Xbox 360; PAL: October 15, 2010; NA: October 19, 2010; JP: October 21, 2010 Trilogy PlayStation 4; JP: July 27, 2017; NA: August 25, 2017; EU: August 25, 2017 Xbox One; WW: August 25, 2017 Microsoft Windows; WW: August 25, 2017 Nintendo Switch; WW: April 26, 2018
- Genre: Fighting
- Modes: Single-player, multiplayer

Naruto Shippuden: Ultimate Ninja Storm 2, known in Japan as Naruto Shippuden: Narutimate Storm 2, is a 2010 fighting video game developed by CyberConnect2 for the PlayStation 3 and Xbox 360. It is the second installment in the Ultimate Ninja Storm series, and the sequel to Naruto: Ultimate Ninja Storm, published by Namco Bandai Games. It is based on the anime and manga series Naruto by Masashi Kishimoto. The story and cast are based on their Part II manga appearances, known in the anime as Naruto Shippuden. The game mainly stars title character Naruto Uzumaki, a teenage ninja, and his fights against the Akatsuki terrorist organization.

The game began development following the completion of Ultimate Ninja Storm, and took into account fans' comments about the first game. The team wanted to include more drama in this game to appeal to more gamers. As well as Naruto characters, the game features Tekken character Lars Alexandersson as a guest character. His inclusion was the result of CyberConnect2 CEO Hiroshi Matsuyama seeing his alternate design by Kishimoto for Tekken 6. The audio was composed by Chikayo Fukuda.

Critical response to the game has ranged from average to positive. Reviewers praised the visuals and boss fights comparing them positively to the anime series, but criticized the lack of events in the world map after completing the game's story mode. Storm 2 has achieved strong sales, becoming one of Bandai's bestselling games for 2010. A sequel, called Naruto Shippuden: Ultimate Ninja Storm 3, was released in 2013. All the Storm games were re-released in 2017 as part of a compilation.

== Gameplay ==
The player is controlling Naruto Uzumaki (middle) and has called the assist character Sakura Haruno (right) to aid him in the fight against Kakashi Hatake (left).

Naruto Shippuden: Ultimate Ninja Storm 2's gameplay retains many of the elements of the first game and has 23 fighting stages. It has nine chapters including the prologue and an extra chapter. Each character can gain new combos and jutsu by activating the Awakening Mode. Lars Alexandersson, a guest character from Tekken 6, is also playable in the game. As the story progresses, players will unlock new Jutsu and Ultimate Jutsu for certain characters.

Support characters return with two new features. The first feature is Support Types — Guard, Attack, and Balanced. These can be unlocked for each support character and decide its actions during Support Drive level one. The second new feature is the Support Drive, which has two levels. Level one is activated once a player's support characters are summoned enough times. When Support Drive level one is activated, a player's support characters will summon themselves automatically depending on their support type, and on what actions the player is executing. When a support character automatically summons itself, it will not reset the support character charge gauge, and can even be summoned when the gauge is not full. A support character cannot be manually summoned by a player if it has already summoned itself automatically. If a support character is set to Defense, it will automatically summon itself when a player is charging chakra, and block the opponent from dashing into the player.

An example of a quick time event in which the player has to press the circle button to defeat the enemy.

When a support character is set to Attack, they will help attack an opponent through combos, and knock the opponent back when a combo sends them flying. Set to Balanced, it will throw projectiles alongside the player when the player uses chakra projectiles and block incoming Ultimate Jutsus, at the expense of losing that support for a while. When Support Drive level two is activated, for a limited time a player will be capable of releasing a Team Ultimate Jutsu, activated by hitting the chakra button three times and then the attack button. A Team Ultimate Jutsu drains an enormous amount of a player's chakra, and does massive damage if it makes contact with an unguarded opponent.

The game does not have free roaming in the same sense as the original, instead being replaced by more traditional JRPG screens and movement. In addition to the Leaf Village, players are able to travel outside the village, through environments ranging from forests to deserts, and the Hidden Sand Village. Boss battles have returned, with quick time events and cutscenes.

Players can access multiple online features; quick matches have opponents chosen at random, ranked matches with leader boards, match customization, as well as the availability to host matches.

== Plot and characters ==
The game's adventure mode covers the original manga and anime's beginning with the return of young orphan ninja Naruto Uzumaki to his ninja village, Konohagakure, after two and half years of training with Jiraiya. Across the story mode, Naruto and his allies fight many enemies from a terrible criminal organization known as Akatsuki. Starting with the first chapter, they capture Gaara, once leader of the Sunagakure village. The second chapter follows Naruto's team in their failed attempt to take former ally Sasuke Uchiha from the criminal Orochimaru. The following two chapters focus on Konohagakure member Shikamaru Nara as his team again battles new members from Akatsuki. The next chapter has Sasuke betraying and defeating Orochimaru while forming his own ninja team to track down his older brother, Itachi Uchiha, who murdered his entire clan years ago. The last two chapters follow Pain, the acting leader of Akatsuki, as he kills his teacher, Jiraiya, and Naruto trains to avenge his master's death. Clearing the story mode unlocks an additional "fragment" chapter detailing Sasuke's Taka team's failed capture of Killer Bee, following their alliance with Akatsuki.

Ultimate Ninja Storm 2 has 44 characters and 15 support characters. While Naruto is at first present with his initial Shippuden techniques, later in the game he is playable with his "Sage" techniques as a separate character. Tekken 6's Lars Alexandersson is a guest character. Lars appears in his third alternate costume from Tekken 6 designed by Naruto creator Masashi Kishimoto. While unlockable through the game, the character of Minato Namikaze can be used instantly with a code that comes with the game's limited edition.

== Development ==
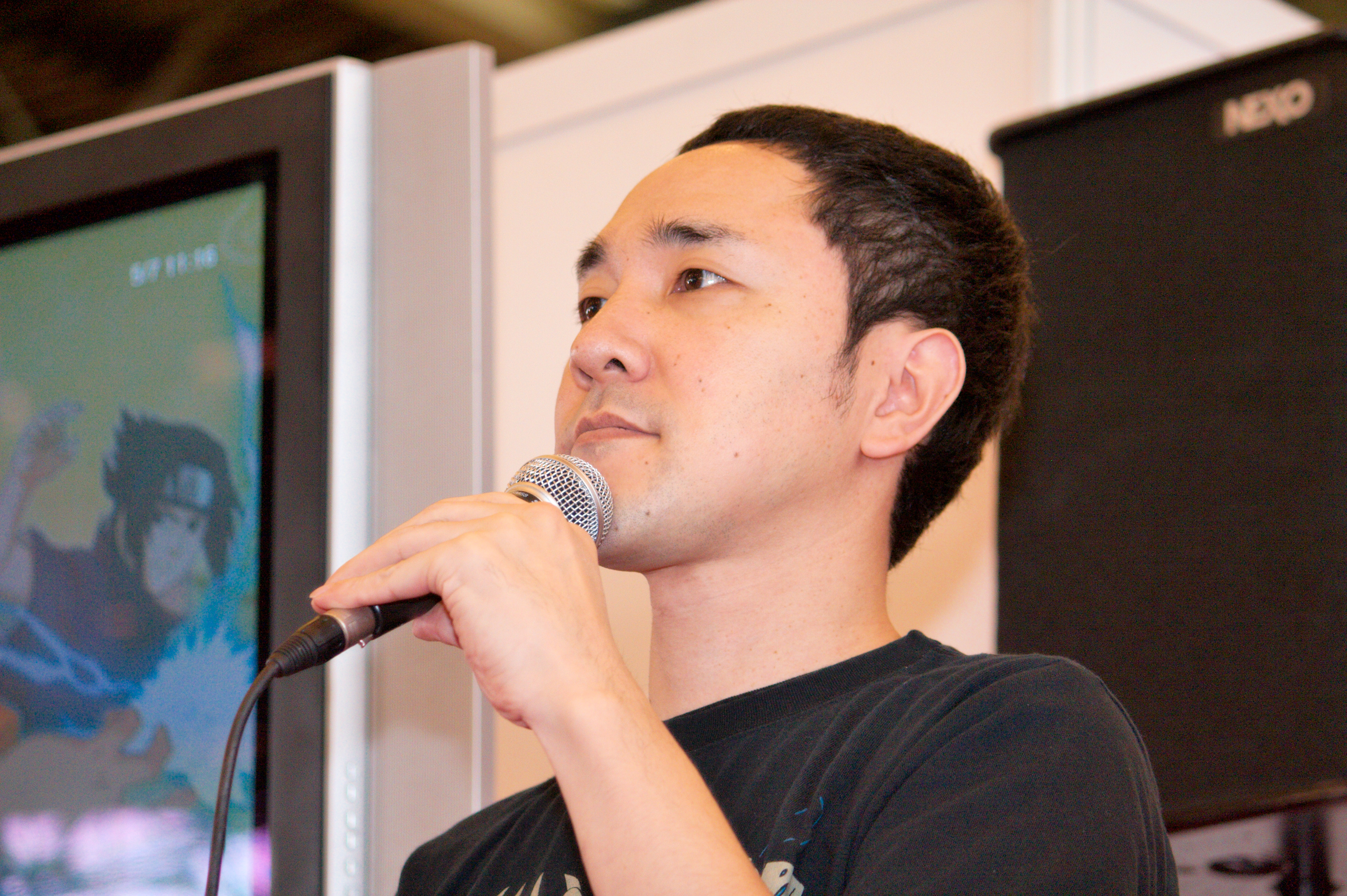
Hiroshi Matsuyama stated the CyberConnect2 staff wanted to fix issues in the original Storm game.

Naruto Shippuden: Ultimate Ninja Storm 2 had been in development by CyberConnect2's Fukuoka studio in Japan since the release of the first Naruto: Ultimate Ninja Storm title. Because of the series' worldwide popularity, CyberConnect2 decided to release it for the first time for Xbox 360 consoles. The multiplayer feature was added based on player feedback from the first game. Adding other new features was a matter of trial and error, in addition to balancing all the elements so each character has a fair chance of winning a fight. For example, in a fight between young Naruto and Jiraiya the staff made adjustments so it was equally fun and empowering playing either character. The team wanted to "recreate" the look and feel of comics during the videos and cinematic sequences. This required going through the game adjusting elements to fit this objective while ensuring the gameplay remained responsive. All the sequences were worked out beforehand using storyboards, then the gameplay elements were created before the aesthetic and sound design parts were added. The team found this challenging as their goal was to make these sequences of the same quality as the anime. In contrast to the Ultimate Ninja games made for the PlayStation 2, the team was able to add more strategy for the next generation of consoles. For example, Storm 2 allowed players use two assistant characters. Masashi Kishimoto supervised the game's contents and approved many of the original sections of the game's story mode, finding them well made.

CyberConnect2 worked to make Storm 2 more appealing than its prequel by adding more special effects and scenes with different angles. This is evident mainly in the game's boss battles where the environment changes as the fights continue. In one example, Sakura Haruno and Chiyo fight the boss Sasori. As the battle continues, the cave in which the characters are fighting is destroyed, which the team said was difficult to do. In other boss battles, the fighting system changes, an example being when Gaara has to use projectile techniques while flying around his village chasing Deidara. The staff visited fansites where the first Storm game was discussed and listened to the issues fans raised and addressed them so that they, and new gamers, would notice the improvements the team made to the sequel. The result was that even gamers who were not familiar with the franchise found the sequel interesting.

CEO Hiroshi Matsuyama said that one of the most important battles he wanted to create was the fight between Sasuke Uchiha and his brother, Itachi. Itachi was Matsuyama's favorite character and he felt emotional while developing the fight. Besides including the cast of Naruto in their older forms, the game features Lars Alexandersson from the Tekken fighting series. His design attracted Matsuyama who asked the Tekken staff if he could include Lars. Members from both the Naruto and Tekken games' staff were surprised by how well he fitted in with the cast. Although Lars does not have a story in the game, Matsuyama expected gamers to enjoy playing as him in regular battles and online gameplay. The artificial intelligence was improved to make the characters' fights more entertaining alongside the new boss fights. Matsuyama refrained from including downloadable content in the game.

=== Release ===
Naruto Shippuden: Ultimate Ninja Storm 2 was officially announced on December 20, 2009, by Namco Bandai Games at a Jump Festa event. V Jump magazine revealed the game a few days beforehand. As CyberConnect2's first multi-platform project, they worked closely with Microsoft. The pre-release playable demo for Ultimate Ninja Storm 2 was first mentioned on the official Japanese website on July 8, 2010, and was made available for download on July 29, 2010, from the Japanese PlayStation Network and Xbox Live. The demo was also made available in an English version on the European PlayStation Network and Xbox Live on August 25, 2010, as well as the American PlayStation Network and Xbox Live on August 24, 2010. On September 27, 2010, Namco Bandai announced the game had gone gold. Hiroshi Matsuyama was pleased with the game's nearly simultaneous release dates in various parts of the world.

The game's music was composed by Chikayo Fukuda, and the original soundtrack titled Naruto Shippūden: Ultimate Ninja Storm 2 - The Original Video Game Soundtrack was released on October 15, 2010, in Europe featuring a total of fourteen tracks as part of a limited edition of the game.

== Reception ==
=== Critical response ===
Reception

Aggregate score
Aggregator	Score	
Aggregator	PS3	Xbox 360
Metacritic	76/100	74/100

Review scores
Publication	Score	
Publication	PS3	Xbox 360
Destructoid	8.5/10	N/A
Eurogamer	8/10	N/A
Famitsu	39/40	35/40
GameRevolution	C+	C+
GameSpot	7/10	7/10
GameTrailers	N/A	8.4/10
GameZone	7/10	7/10
IGN	8/10	8/10
Joystiq	N/A	3.5/5
PALGN	6.5/10	N/A
VideoGamer.com	7/10	7/10

The game received "average" reviews according to review aggregator Metacritic based on Western sites, while Japanese magazine Famitsu gave it a nearly perfect score of 39 out of 40 for its PlayStation 3 version and a 35 for the Xbox 360 version. Some sites complimented the story mode as well as the presentation of the graphics which might attract gamers or appeal to players who are not too familiar with the Naruto series. IGN's reviewer complimented the game saying, while he was not a fan of Naruto, he was impressed by the game's narrative to the point of caring about the characters' fates; another reviewer felt that some parts might confuse some gamers. The reviewer for GameTrailers found the story appealing despite its cliches. He felt the sequel was a major improvement over the first Storm game, and enjoyed how some characters can be unlocked. Another aspect praised by reviewers was the boss fights for their use of cinematic scenes and quick time events. VideoGamer.com said gamers would be amazed by the game's quality during these fights. Famitsu praised the advancements in gameplay and character control, in addition to positively comparing the animation and artstyle with the Naruto anime. While finding these boss fights appealing, some reviewers found some of other fights anticlimactic. Eurogamer felt Storm 2 was a good sequel based on the new characters, new modes as well as its online mode. The inclusion of Tekken guest character Lars Alexandersson was also well received by writers.

Other criticisms of the game were that the characters had similar moves and that sidequests do not involve fights. While the visuals were praised, the world map was criticized for not having many activities other than finding items; some criticized the characters' interactions. Other criticism included the noticeably long loading times that occur during the story mode, as well as the similarities between characters' moves, which made the sequel lack the appeal of famous fighting games. On the other hand, Engadget applauded the breadth of strategies in the fights and the fact that players have to focus on interrupting their enemy's charging while trying to recharge themselves. The use of items within fights, as well as sub-missions, has prompted some to compare the game with Eastern role-playing games. Gamezone said the worst aspect of the game was its multiple use of arenas. Reviewers had mixed opinions about the audio. The soundtrack and the use of both English and Japanese voices was praised, while one reviewer found the cast unlikable, and disliked the plot and the voiceovers.

=== Sales ===
Namco Bandai hoped Ultimate Ninja Storm 2 would sell 700,000 units by November 2010. While the PlayStation 3 version sold 63,675 units in its Japanese debut, the Xbox 360 had poor sales of only 3,000 units. Siliconera believed this was mainly due to the first Storm game not being released for that console. By late November 2010, the game had shipped 1 million copies worldwide; 500,000 in Europe, 340,000 in North America and 160,000 in Japan. In May 2011, Namco Bandai reported that with 1.1 million units sold, it had become its second best-selling game from 2010 after Tekken 6. In December 2010, Namco announced the game had shipped two million copies worldwide.

=== Legacy ===
Because some young gamers were unable to play Storm 2 due to the price of consoles, a spin-off game, Naruto Shippuden: Ultimate Ninja Impact, was released on the handheld PlayStation Portable console so that it would be more accessible. A sequel to Storm 2, Naruto Shippuden: Ultimate Ninja Storm 3, was released in 2013. Multiple changes were made to the gameplay such as the use of Awakenings to make fights enjoyable. On August 25, 2017, Bandai Namco released Naruto Shippuden: Ultimate Ninja Storm Legacy which contains the third game - Naruto Shippuden: Ultimate Ninja Storm 3 Full Burst. At the same time, Storm 2 and its prequel and sequels were released online. The trilogy was also released for the Nintendo Switch.
