= Naruto: Ultimate Ninja =

Video game franchise

Naruto: Ultimate Ninja Naruto: Narutimate Series
- Genres: Fighting, role-playing
- Developer: CyberConnect2
- Publisher: Bandai Namco Entertainment
- Composer: Chikayo Fukuda
- Platforms: PlayStation 2, PlayStation 3, PlayStation Portable, Xbox 360, Microsoft Windows, PlayStation 4, Xbox One, Nintendo Switch, PlayStation 5, Xbox Series X/S, macOS, Android, iOS, tvOS
- First release: Naruto: Ultimate Ninja; October 23, 2003
- Latest release: Naruto X Boruto: Ultimate Ninja Storm Connections; November 17, 2023
- Parent series: Naruto video games

Naruto: Ultimate Ninja, known in Japan as the Naruto: Narutimate Series (Japanese: NARUTO(ナルト) ナルティメットシリーズ, Hepburn: Naruto: Narutimetto Shirīzu), is a series of fighting video games, based on the popular manga and anime series Naruto by Masashi Kishimoto. It was developed by CyberConnect2, and published by Bandai and later Bandai Namco Entertainment. The first game was released in 2003 for the PlayStation 2, and was followed by four more titles for the system, as well as five spinoffs for the PlayStation Portable. A follow-up for the PlayStation 3, titled Naruto: Ultimate Ninja Storm, was the first to feature three-dimensional battles, and began the long-running Storm sub-series. While starting out as a series exclusive to the PlayStation family of systems, the series has also been present on Xbox and PC platforms since the release of Naruto Shippuden: Ultimate Ninja Storm 2 for the Xbox 360 and Naruto Shippuden: Ultimate Ninja Storm 3 Full Burst for Windows, respectively. Latest releases were also ported to the Nintendo Switch. The Naruto: Ultimate Ninja series sold over 20 million copies worldwide as of December 2019 and in 2024 the Ultimate Ninja Storm series sold over 30 million copies and Bandai Namco posted a congratulatory art from the author, Masashi Kishimoto, as a celebration of 30 million units sold worldwide.

== Naruto: Ultimate Ninja series ==
=== Naruto: Ultimate Ninja ===
Naruto: Ultimate Ninja
- Developer: CyberConnect2
- Publisher: Namco Bandai Games
- Composer: Chikayo Fukuda
- Series: Naruto: Ultimate Ninja
- Platform: PlayStation 2
- Release: JP: October 23, 2003; NA: June 26, 2006; AU: November 17, 2006; EU: February 9, 2007
- Genre: Fighting game

Naruto: Ultimate Ninja, known in Japan as Naruto: Narutimate Hero (NARUTO(ナルト) ナルティメットヒーロー, Naruto: Narutimetto Hīrō), is the first installment of the Ultimate Ninja series and the first installment of the Hero series in Japan. The game was released on October 23, 2003 in Japan, June 26, 2006 in North America, November 17, 2006 in Australia, and February 9, 2007 in Europe.

=== Naruto: Ultimate Ninja 2 ===
Naruto: Ultimate Ninja 2
- Developer: CyberConnect2
- Publisher: Namco Bandai Games
- Director: Hiroshi Matsuyama
- Composer: Chikayo Fukuda
- Series: Naruto: Ultimate Ninja
- Platform: PlayStation 2
- Release: JP: September 30, 2004; NA: June 12, 2007; EU: October 19, 2007; AU: October 31, 2007
- Genre: Fighting game

Naruto: Ultimate Ninja 2, known in Japan as Naruto: Narutimate Hero 2 (NARUTO(ナルト) ナルティメットヒーロー2, Naruto: Narutimetto Hīrō 2), is the second installment of the fighting game series Naruto: Ultimate Ninja and the second installment of the Hero series in Japan. Like some other Naruto games in Japan, this one was available in two covers: one featuring Naruto Uzumaki along with several different characters in the background, and the other with Sasuke Uchiha and several other characters. The game was released on September 30, 2004, in Japan, June 12, 2007 in North America, and October 2007 in the PAL region.

=== Naruto: Ultimate Ninja 3 ===
Naruto: Ultimate Ninja 3
- Developer: CyberConnect2
- Publisher: Namco Bandai Games
- Composer: Chikayo Fukuda
- Series: Naruto: Ultimate Ninja
- Platform: PlayStation 2
- Release: JP: December 22, 2005; NA: March 25, 2008; EU: September 5, 2008; AU: September 12, 2008
- Genre: Fighting game

Naruto: Ultimate Ninja 3, known as in Japan as Naruto: Narutimate Hero 3 (NARUTO(ナルト) ナルティメットヒーロー3, Naruto: Narutimetto Hīrō 3), is the third installment of the fighting game series Naruto: Ultimate Ninja and the third and final installment of the Hero series in Japan. The game was released in Japan on December 22, 2005, and the rest of the world in 2008.

=== Naruto Shippūden: Ultimate Ninja 4 ===
Naruto Shippuden: Ultimate Ninja 4 Naruto Shippūden: Narutimate Accel
- Developer: CyberConnect2
- Publisher: Namco Bandai Games
- Composer: Chikayo Fukuda
- Series: Naruto: Ultimate Ninja
- Platform: PlayStation 2
- Release: JP: April 5, 2007; NA: March 24, 2009; EU: May 1, 2009; AU: May 7, 2009
- Genre: Fighting game
- Modes: Single-player, multiplayer

Naruto Shippuden: Ultimate Ninja 4, known in Japan as Naruto Shippuden: Narutimate Accel (NARUTO(ナルト) 疾風伝 ナルティメットアクセル, Naruto Shippūden: Narutimetto Akuseru) is the fourth installment of the Ultimate Ninja series and the first installment of the Accel series in Japan. It was released in Japan on April 5, 2007, in North America on March 24, 2009, and in Europe on April 30, 2009. The game introduces Naruto Shippūden characters for the first time, featuring 52 playable characters. Other changes include the introduction of fixed ultimate jutsu, which change as health decreases or if the player enters any secondary mode. The graphical style of the game has also been toned down, retaining the anime look. The RPG mode (now called Master Mode) is heavily expanded, now featuring a more action-oriented gameplay and explore the massive world of Naruto (unlike the previous games which had a more sandbox-style gameplay). This is the last Naruto game that features an English dub.

The game only covers halfway through the Kazekage Rescue arc in the Shippuden storyline (roughly at episode 15 in the anime), though to make up for the lack of story, a new arc is created for the game that takes place before the Shippuden storyline called the "Black Shadow". Hero's History mode from Ultimate Ninja 3 is also retained, now retelling the events of the original series more faithfully and includes completely redone and improved scenes from Naruto: Ultimate Ninja 3 as well as redone CGI scenes.

=== Naruto Shippūden: Ultimate Ninja 5 ===
Naruto Shippūden: Ultimate Ninja 5 Naruto Shippūden: Narutimate Accel 2
- Developer: CyberConnect2
- Publisher: Namco Bandai Games
- Composer: Chikayo Fukuda
- Series: Naruto: Ultimate Ninja
- Platform: PlayStation 2
- Release: JP: December 20, 2007; EU: November 27, 2009; AU: December 3, 2009
- Genre: Fighting game
- Modes: Single-player, multiplayer

Naruto Shippuden: Ultimate Ninja 5, known in Japan as Naruto Shippuden: Narutimate Accel 2, is the fifth and final PlayStation 2 installment in the Ultimate Ninja series, developed by CyberConnect2 and published by Namco Bandai Games. It was released in Japan on December 20, 2007, and localized for Europe in 2009. The localized version retained Japanese voice acting and did not receive a North American release.

The game features 62 playable characters and introduces support fighters who can assist during battles and perform combined attacks with certain partners. Its story-driven Master Mode combines three-dimensional exploration, character progression and optional missions, covering events from Naruto's return to the Hidden Leaf Village through the reunion with Sasuke.

== Naruto: Ultimate Ninja Heroes series ==
=== Naruto: Ultimate Ninja Heroes ===
Naruto: Ultimate Ninja Heroes
- Developers: CyberConnect2; MiCROViSion
- Publisher: Namco Bandai Games
- Series: Naruto: Ultimate Ninja
- Platform: PlayStation Portable
- Release: NA: August 28, 2007; EU: September 14, 2007; AU: November 17, 2007
- Genre: Fighting game

Naruto: Ultimate Ninja Heroes is a North American and European-exclusive fighting game and the first installment of the Heroes series in the west. It was released in North America on August 28, 2007 and in Europe on September 14, 2007. It is essentially an edited version of Naruto: Narutimate Portable, serving as a prequel to the next game, as the Japanese dub is not included in this game, essentially turning the game into a scaled down version of Naruto: Ultimate Ninja 2.

Story Mode, Kabuto, Shizune, The Third Hokage, and two stages were removed in this release, while Naruto & Sasuke's secret techniques were modified to prevent spoilers (as the English dub had not reached the Sasuke Retrieval arc yet). To compensate for these removals, the game now has a 3-on-3 battle system, similar to The King of Fighters; where the first team to defeat all three members of the other team wins. The game features 20 characters, eight stages, and several new features, such as a three-on-three fighting system, wireless two-player battles, and "Hidden Team Skills", which grant special abilities to a certain combination of characters.

=== Naruto: Ultimate Ninja Heroes 2: The Phantom Fortress ===
Naruto: Ultimate Ninja Heroes 2: The Phantom Fortress
- Developers: CyberConnect2; Artdink
- Publishers: Bandai (Japan); Namco Bandai Games (North American, Europe, Australia)
- Composer: Chikayo Fukuda
- Series: Naruto: Ultimate Ninja
- Platform: PlayStation Portable
- Release: JP: March 30, 2006; NA: June 24, 2008; EU: July 11, 2008; AU: July 31, 2008
- Genre: Fighting game

Naruto: Ultimate Ninja Heroes 2: The Phantom Fortress, known in Japan as Naruto: Narutimate Portable - Mugenjō no Maki (NARUTO(ナルト) ナルティメットポータブル 無幻城の巻, Naruto: Narutimetto Pōtaburu - Mugenjō no Maki; lit. "Naruto: Narutimate Portable - Castle of Illusions"), was released in Japan on March 30, 2006, and in North America on June 24, 2008, and in Europe on July 11, 2008. It is the second installment of the Heroes series in the west.

=== Naruto Shippuden: Ultimate Ninja Heroes 3 ===
Naruto Shippūden: Ultimate Ninja Heroes 3 Naruto Shippūden: Narutimate Accel 3
- Developer: CyberConnect2
- Publisher: Namco Bandai Games
- Composer: Chikayo Fukuda
- Series: Naruto: Ultimate Ninja
- Platform: PlayStation Portable
- Release: JP: December 10, 2009; NA: May 11, 2010; PAL: May 14, 2010; AU: May 20, 2010
- Genre: Fighting game

Naruto Shippuden: Ultimate Ninja Heroes 3, known as Naruto Shippuden: Narutimate Accel 3 (NARUTO(ナルト) 疾風伝 ナルティメットアクセル3, Naruto Shippūden: Narutimetto Akuseru 3) in Japan, is the sixth installment in the Ultimate Ninja series and the third and final installment of both the Heroes series in the west and the Accel series in Japan, announced as an exclusive title for the PlayStation Portable. The game was released in Japan on December 10, 2009 and was released in North America on May 11, 2010. The game features a roster of more than 50 characters, 48 of which are from the TV series Naruto Shippuden. English dub return since Ultimate Ninja 4. The game features four-player local multiplayer battles, as well as Sasuke and the members of Team Hebi. It features a story arc "Leaf Anbu Attacks" about Village Hidden under the Moon designed by CyberConnect2 that is unique to this game, as well as a regular one that follows the Naruto Shippūden storyline and one that follows Sasuke's story. This was the last game released under the Ultimate Ninja Heroes moniker.

=== Naruto Shippuden: Ultimate Ninja Impact ===
Naruto Shippūden: Ultimate Ninja Impact
- Developer: CyberConnect2 / Racjin
- Publisher: Namco Bandai Games
- Composer: Chikayo Fukuda
- Series: Naruto: Ultimate Ninja
- Platform: PlayStation Portable
- Release: NA: October 18, 2011; JP: October 20, 2011; EU: November 11, 2011; AU: November 24, 2011
- Genre: Adventure / Fighting

Naruto Shippūden: Ultimate Ninja Impact (Naruto Shippuden: Narutimetto Inpakuto (NARUTO(ナルト) 疾風伝 ナルティメットインパクト) in Japan), is the sixth Naruto title for the PlayStation Portable. The game's storyline covers the Kazekage Rescue arc up to the Five Kage Summit Arc (ending around episode 214 of the anime).

The game features boss battles, an all new rush battle system, 1 vs 100 action, ad hoc multiplayer missions, and also features over 50 characters, 26 of which are playable. As a special gift at New York Comic Con 2011, the first 200 people that went to watch Naruto Shippuden the Movie: Bonds along with Naruto Japanese voice actress, Junko Takeuchi, received a free copy of the game. It is the last game in the series to be featured on the PSP, with no further releases due to the release of the PlayStation Vita, the successor system to the PSP.

== Naruto: Ultimate Ninja Storm series ==
Release timeline
2008	Naruto: Ultimate Ninja Storm
2009
2010	Naruto Shippuden: Ultimate Ninja Storm 2
2011
2012	Naruto Shippuden: Ultimate Ninja Storm Generations
2013	Naruto Shippuden Ultimate Ninja Storm 3 Full Burst
2014	Naruto Shippuden: Ultimate Ninja Storm Revolution
2015
2016	Naruto Shippuden: Ultimate Ninja Storm 4
2017
2018
2019
2020
2021
2022
2023	Naruto x Boruto: Ultimate Ninja Storm Connections

=== Naruto: Ultimate Ninja Storm ===
Naruto: Ultimate Ninja Storm, known in Japan as Naruto: Narutimate Storm (NARUTO(ナルト) ナルティメットストーム Naruto: Narutimetto Sutōmu) is a fighting game developed by CyberConnect2 and published by Namco Bandai Games. The game was initially released as an exclusive for the PlayStation 3 in North America, Europe and Australia in November 2008 and in Japan on January 15, 2009. This is the first Naruto fighting game to feature a 3-dimensional fighting system as well as the first to be playable in high-definition.

=== Naruto Shippuden: Ultimate Ninja Storm 2 ===
Naruto Shippuden: Ultimate Ninja Storm 2, known in Japan as Naruto Shippuden: Narutimate Storm 2 (NARUTO(ナルト) 疾風伝 ナルティメットストーム2) was officially announced on December 20, 2009, for the Xbox 360 and PlayStation 3. The game features more characters, stages and story-content than its predecessor, as well as being the first Naruto game to feature online multiplayer. It was released on October 15, 2010, in Europe, October 19, 2010 in North America, and October 21, 2010 in Japan.

Lars Alexandersson from the Tekken series also makes an appearance as a playable character. The design used for the game is the costume designed by Naruto creator Masashi Kishimoto for Tekken 6.

=== Naruto Shippuden: Ultimate Ninja Storm Generations ===
Naruto Shippuden: Ultimate Ninja Storm Generations, known in Japan as Naruto Shippuden: Narutimate Storm Generation (NARUTO(ナルト) 疾風伝 ナルティメットストーム GENERATION(ジェネレーション), Naruto Shippūden: Narutimetto Sutōmu Jenerēshon) was officially announced on June 18, 2011, for the PlayStation 3 and Xbox 360. Unlike previous Storm games, the game's story mode features separate campaigns for several different characters, with cutscenes being newly animated OVAs. It was released on February 23, 2012, in Japan, March 13, 2012 in North America, and March 30, 2012 in Europe. Generations is the only game in the Storm series to have not received a PC release.

=== Naruto Shippuden: Ultimate Ninja Storm 3 (Full Burst) ===
Naruto Shippuden: Ultimate Ninja Storm 3, known in Japan as Naruto Shippuden: Narutimate Storm 3 (NARUTO(ナルト) 疾風伝 ナルティメットストーム3) was officially announced on June 24, 2012, for the PlayStation 3 and Xbox 360. Mob Battles akin to Naruto Shippūden: Ultimate Ninja Impact were implemented in the story mode, and giant boss-battles from previous Storm games (which were not present in Generations) returned. It was released on March 5, 2013, in North America, March 8 in Europe and April 18 in Japan.

A re-release, Naruto Shippuden: Ultimate Ninja Storm 3 Full Burst was released on October 22, 2013 in North America, October 24 in Japan and January 31, 2014 in Europe; it features revamped cinematics, all previously released DLC costumes (with the exceptions of Naruto's Goku costume and Sakura's Hello Kitty costume), a new story chapter and an additional Challenge Mode. It is the first game in the Ultimate Ninja series to be released for PC and Steam.

=== Naruto Shippūden: Ultimate Ninja Storm Revolution ===
Naruto Shippuden: Ultimate Ninja Storm Revolution, known in Japan as Naruto Shippuden: Narutimate Storm Revolution (NARUTO(ナルト) 疾風伝 ナルティメットストーム REVOLUTION(レボリューション)) was officially announced on November 27, 2013, for PlayStation 3 and Xbox 360, followed by the announcement of a PC release on September 16, 2014. The game features a restructured fighting system and new ways of forming teams based on character skills, along with various other gameplay tweaks catered to competitive-play. Exclusively for the game, Masashi Kishimoto created the character Mecha-Naruto as well as new designs for the characters in the Akatsuki, whose back-stories covered in the game's "Ninja Escapades" mode (which includes OVAs, akin to Generations). The game also introduces a new mode titled "Ninja World Tournament" where the player can battle against three CPU fighters at the same time. By September 16, 2014, all versions of the game had been released in Japan, Europe and North America.

=== Naruto Shippūden: Ultimate Ninja Storm 4 ===
Naruto Shippuden: Ultimate Ninja Storm 4, known in Japan as Naruto Shippūden: Narutimate Storm 4 (NARUTO(ナルト) 疾風伝 ナルティメットストーム 4), was announced on December 11, 2014, for the PlayStation 4, Xbox One and PC as the sixth installment and final main installment in the Storm series. It was released on February 4, 2016, in Japan, February 5, 2016 in Europe, and February 9, 2016 in North America. The western release added Spanish and Brazilian Portuguese voices.

An expansion, titled Road to Boruto, covers the story of Boruto: Naruto the Movie and was released on February 2, 2017, in Japan and February 3, 2017 in North America and Europe.

A Nintendo Switch port including all DLC was released on April 24, 2020. Coinciding with the release of the Switch port was a DLC pack titled Next Generations, released on PlayStation 4, Xbox One and PC via Steam. The pack includes Kinshiki and Momoshiki Ōtsutsuki as playable characters, along with 11 Boruto-era costumes for characters in the original game.

=== Naruto Shippuden: Ultimate Ninja Storm Trilogy/Legacy ===
In April 2017, it was announced that Naruto: Ultimate Ninja Storm, Naruto Shippuden: Ultimate Ninja Storm 2, and Naruto Shippuden: Ultimate Ninja Storm 3: Full Burst would be bundled together and released as a compilation on PlayStation 4, Xbox One, Microsoft Windows, and Nintendo Switch titled Naruto Shippuden: Ultimate Ninja Storm Trilogy. The trilogy includes enhanced graphics and 1080p resolution. It was released physically and digitally on July 27, 2017, in Japan. A physical Western release, titled Naruto Shippuden: Ultimate Ninja Storm Legacy, contains the three games as well as Naruto Shippuden: Ultimate Ninja Storm 4: Road to Boruto, and was made available for PlayStation 4, Xbox One, and Microsoft Windows on August 25, 2017.

=== Naruto x Boruto: Ultimate Ninja Storm Connections ===
Naruto x Boruto: Ultimate Ninja Storm Connections, known in Japan as Naruto x Boruto: Narutimate Storm Connections (NARUTO X BORUTO(ナルトクロスボルト) ナルティメットストーム CONNECTIONS(コネクションズ)) is the seventh installment in the Ultimate Ninja Storm series. On February 23, 2023, in celebration for the Naruto anime's 20th anniversary, was announced for the PlayStation 4, and 5, Nintendo Switch, Xbox One and Series X & S, and PC. It features content and story from all previous Ninja Storm games, as well as an original storyline. All 124 characters returned, along with newcomers such as Indra and Asura Ōtsutsuki. 60 FPS support is included with next-gen consoles. It was released in Japan on November 16, 2023, followed by its global release the next day on November 17. Furthermore, the Xbox and PC versions, as well as the Western release for the PlayStation and Switch versions, added French and German voices.

Shortly after release, the developers were accused by the English voice actors from the game to have re-dubbed over their lines with AI. The developers revealed that the questionable voice work was just the result of poor editing, and it will be fixed in a later update.

== Naruto Shippuden: Ultimate Ninja Blazing ==
Naruto Shippuden: Ultimate Ninja Blazing
- Developer: GREE, Inc.
- Publisher: Bandai Namco Entertainment
- Series: Naruto: Ultimate Ninja
- Platforms: iOS, Android
- Release: July 14, 2016
- Genre: Action role-playing game

Naruto Shippuden: Ultimate Ninja Blazing, known as Naruto Shippūden Narutimate Blazing (NARUTO(ナルト) 疾風伝 ナルティメットブレイジング) in Japan, is the first mobile platform game in the Naruto: Ultimate Ninja game series published by Bandai Namco Entertainment. It was a turn-based action role-playing game available on iOS and Android. The game was removed from iOS and Android stores on February 9, 2021.

Players engaged in combat by strategically moving their characters. These characters could level up, known as 'awakening,' to beat stronger opponents. After that, they could 'limit break,' to achieve an even stronger state. The game featured the following playable game modes: Story, Emergency Mission (Missions to get items that improve your ninjas or new ninjas), Trial Missions (get Trial Coins to Limit Break characters), Phantom Castle (fight against Teams of other players and ascend to Floor 100 - prizes for each floor), Ninja Road (get an Acquisition Stone to unlock an ability of a character you own by beating all 20 maps in a row), Ninja World Clash (PvP: Build a Team and play against online opponents). The game was free to play, and offered in-app purchase.

== Reception ==
Aggregate review scores As of July 31, 2018.
Game	Metacritic
Ultimate Ninja	75/100
Ultimate Ninja 2	73/100
Ultimate Ninja 3	75/100
Ultimate Ninja Heroes	70/100
Ultimate Ninja Heroes 2: The Phantom Fortress	64/100
Ultimate Ninja 4	-
Ultimate Ninja 5	-
Ultimate Ninja Heroes 3	61/100
Ultimate Ninja Storm	PS3: 75/100
Ultimate Ninja Storm 2	PS3: 76/100; X360: 74/100
Ultimate Ninja Impact	59/100
Ultimate Ninja Storm Generations	PS3/X360: 74/100
Ultimate Ninja Storm 3	PS3: 77/100; X360: 70/100
Ultimate Ninja Storm 3 Full Burst	PS3: 73/100; X360: 66/100; PC: 80/100
Ultimate Ninja Storm Revolution	PC: 61/100; PS3: 73/100; X360: 62/100
Ultimate Ninja Storm 4	PS4: 79/100; XONE: 80/100
Ultimate Ninja Storm 4 - Road to Boruto	PS4: 70/100; XONE: 77/100

Various Ultimate Ninja games have become Namco Bandai's best-selling games with Ultimate Ninja Storm 2 being its second best-selling game from 2010 behind Tekken 6 with 1.1 million units sold. In January 2012, Namco Bandai announced that they have sold 10 million Naruto games worldwide, including 1.9 million units in Asia, 4.3 million in North America, and 3.8 million in Europe. In celebration CyberConnect2's CEO Hiroshi Matsuyama participated in the 2012 Paris International Marathon while cosplaying as Naruto Uzumaki, thanking fans. By 2016, more than 15 million units were sold. As of 2019, 20 million units have sold. In 2017, the mobile game Ultimate Ninja Blazing grossed ¥10.5 billion ($66 million) in China. By 2024 more than 30 million Ninja Storm copies sold and Bandai Namco Entertainment posted a congratulatory art from the author, Masashi Kishimoto, as a celebration of 30 million units sold worldwide.

Critical reception to the games has been positive. G4's X-Play gave Ultimate Ninja a three out of five for a creative comicbook feel and stylish cel-shaded graphics, but complained that the controls are too simple, and that the English voices are "slightly questionable". Both IGN and GameSpot noted the game was both accessible and enjoyable and praised the anime/manga-inspired graphics. Titles for the PlayStation Portable received considerably lower averages in gaming sites. Ultimate Ninja Storm was also the only video game to win the Excellent Prize in the Entertainment Division of the 13th annual Japan Media Arts Festival.
