= Sasuke Uchiha =

Fictional character from Naruto

- Naruto character
- Sasuke Uchiha as seen in Part I (right), Part II (left), and the finale as well as the Boruto film and series (middle)
- First appearance: Naruto chapter 3: Enter Sasuke! (1999)
- Created by: Masashi Kishimoto
- Voiced by: Japanese; Noriaki Sugiyama; English; Yuri Lowenthal

In-universe information
- Family: Fugaku Uchiha (father, deceased); Mikoto Uchiha (mother, deceased); Itachi Uchiha (elder brother, deceased)
- Spouse: Sakura Haruno (wife)
- Children: Sarada Uchiha (daughter)
- Ninja rank: Genin in Part I Rogue Ninja in Part II; Vigilante in Boruto
- Ninja team: Team 7 (Part I); Taka (Part II)

Sasuke Uchiha (Japanese: うちは サスケ, Hepburn: Uchiha Sasuke) (/ˈsɑːskeɪ/) (Note: The English manga published by VIZ Media uses the Japanese naming order, surname before given name, and so Sasuke's name is Uchiha Sasuke in the English manga. Other English adaptations use the Western order, that is surname after given name.) is a fictional character in the Naruto manga and anime franchise created by Masashi Kishimoto. Sasuke belongs to the Uchiha clan, a notorious ninja family, and one of the most powerful, allied with Konohagakure (木ノ葉隠れの里; English version: "Hidden Leaf Village"). Most of its members were massacred by Sasuke's older brother, Itachi Uchiha, before the series began, leaving Sasuke as one of the few survivors. Despite becoming empathetic toward his teammates Naruto Uzumaki and Sakura Haruno, Sasuke's feelings of powerlessness force him to abandon his friends and his home in his quest to become stronger than Itachi, and to find Orochimaru. Sasuke appears in several of the series' animated feature films and related media, including video games, original video animations (OVAs), and Boruto: Naruto the Movie (2015) and its manga sequel, Boruto: Naruto Next Generations (2016), in which he is depicted as a vigilante supporting his village and a mentor to Naruto's son Boruto Uzumaki.

Kishimoto conceived Sasuke as a main rival of the series' title character Naruto Uzumaki. Despite Sasuke's dark character development later in the story, Kishimoto avoided portraying him as a villain; he found designing the character challenging and had difficulty creating a suitable look for him. Nonetheless, Kishimoto has grown to enjoy drawing him. In the manga's animated adaptations, Sasuke was voiced by Noriaki Sugiyama in Japanese and Yuri Lowenthal in English.

Sasuke's character has received mixed responses from anime and manga publications. His impressive fighting skills, plot contribution, and rivalry with Naruto Uzumaki received some praise, but he was criticized as a stereotypical rival in the mold of similar characters from other shōnen manga and as exhibiting a cold personality. Nevertheless, Sasuke's characterization in latter parts of the story and more mature personality in the Boruto sequel earned further positive comments. Sasuke has also placed highly in Naruto reader popularity polls and has also been the subject of studies by scholars. Character-based merchandise, including action figures and key chains, have been released.

== Creation ==
=== Development ===
Manga artist Masashi Kishimoto did not include Sasuke Uchiha in his original concept for the Naruto series, a story revolving around the character Naruto Uzumaki. Discussing the series' future, his editor, Kosuke Yahagi, advised him to add a rival character for the protagonist Naruto and he created Sasuke. The character's first name came from Sanpei Shirato's manga Sasuke and Sarutobi Sasuke, a fictional ninja character in Japanese children's stories. To introduce Sasuke, Kishimoto wrote a chapter that was set before the formation of his ninja squad, Team 7. The idea was scrapped; Yahagi told Kishimoto to focus the series' first two chapters on introducing Naruto instead and the focus on Sasuke and the rest of the supporting characters were shown in the next chapters for the first time. Once creating Sasuke's character, Kishimoto decided to use him as a protagonist rather than supporting character in order to start his development at the same time as Naruto. When plot developments made Sasuke one of the story's antagonists, Kishimoto called him and Naruto yin and yang because of their differences and complementary natures. During this period, he was asked whether Sasuke was good or evil; he replied that Sasuke was neither and called him a "very pure person." He said although some of Sasuke's actions such as following his clan's ideas were positive, his self-centeredness tended to cause problems with others. Since the beginning of the story's serialization, Kishimoto planned to conclude the series with a fight between Sasuke and Naruto, but he was uncertain whether the characters would end up as friends or enemies.

Kishimoto had read a variety of manga to obtain ideas for the creation of an effective rivalry between two characters, which he incorporated into Naruto and Sasuke's relationship. He was also inspired by his relationship with his twin brother, Seishi Kishimoto; since childhood, Masashi had worried about Seishi when he faced failure and had tried to help him. To contrast Sasuke with Naruto, Kishimoto made him less emotional and depicted him as a "cool genius"; he felt he had created an ideal rivalry in the pair, and when one character progressed he ensured the other did as well. Kishimoto wanted Naruto and Sasuke to seem like brothers and rivals, building on a mutual experience of childhood loneliness. Although Sasuke does not regard Naruto as a worthy opponent at first, he is surprised by Naruto's growth and becomes fiercely competitive. In the Part I finale, their rivalry leads to a fight and they grow further apart. Kishimoto said he did not want Sasuke to recognize Naruto as an equal until later in Part II.

Although both characters had used ninja techniques throughout the series, Kishimoto wanted the two fighters to rely on hand-to-hand combat for the climax of their final battle. He decided to have Naruto forgive Sasuke because he had also forgiven Nagato, another former enemy. The final fight between Sasuke and Naruto was considered one of the biggest challenges ever faced by the staff from Pierrot as it took an entire month to adapt it from the manga. Director Hiroyuki Yamashita elected himself in charge of the battle which left most of the anime members relieved due to his experience. For the scenario, Pierrot received assistance from CyberConnect2, the video game development studio who had already adapted this battle through the fighting game Naruto Shippuden: Ultimate Ninja Storm 4. There was a need to make every movement in the fight look realistic, giving Sasuke a scary look as well as hair movement in order to express the idea of both fighters willing to do anything to kill each other, which confused some due to Naruto's wish to avoid this fate. The final clash between Sasuke's Chidori and Naruto's Rasengan moves involved references from other scenes of the series to give the viewer a bigger emotional impact. The staff noted that following this fight, Sasuke's face became calmer despite his initial look, giving room to explore his redemption.

Kishimoto found Sasuke a difficult character to write, requiring considerable planning. In the series finale, Sasuke leaves on a solo journey; Kishimoto later stated that in addition to atonement, Sasuke wants to discover the origin of the final antagonist, but this was not explained in the story. He planned Sasuke and Sakura Haruno's romance early in Naruto's production and decided that despite having a good relationship with his allies, Sasuke would remain a rogue ninja at the end of the series.

Kishimoto wished to further explore Sasuke's role in the series after Naruto's finale. He wanted to explain the connection between Sasuke and Sakura in the spin-off manga Naruto: The Seventh Hokage and the Scarlet Spring (2015), which focuses on their daughter, Sarada Uchiha. Despite their separation during Sasuke's mission, which draws him away from his village, the story explains the bond between the three characters. Kishimoto focused on the final scene of the Uchiha family, which he regards as the spin-off's most important facet. Because Sasuke had few appearances in the Naruto films, Kishimoto decided to give him a bigger role in Boruto: Naruto the Movie (2015), in which he teaches Naruto's firstborn child, Boruto Uzumaki; a reference to Piccolo and Gohan in Akira Toriyama's Dragon Ball manga series and also depicted in the manga Boruto: Naruto Next Generations (2016). Kishimoto identified Naruto's fights alongside Sasuke against Momoshiki as the highlights of the film and asked that the film's staff pay close attention to those sequences. Two other scenes written by the staff which surprised Kishimoto were Sasuke's use of one of his taijutsu moves and the combination of his Susanoo technique and Naruto's recreation of the Nine-Tailed Fox. Another relationship the novelist Jun Esaka wanted to explore was the one Sasuke has with his wife in Sasuke Retsuden most notably in the manga adaptation where liked the focus on romance.

=== Design ===
While early designs of Sasuke as seen in Part I (left) were similar to the final one, for Part II (right) Kishimoto conceived multiple sketches which were scrapped.

Kishimoto regarded Sasuke as his most memorable character design because he was developed as Naruto's opposite. He said the design of Sasuke and his Sharingan (写輪眼; lit. "Copy Wheel Eye", English manga: "Mirror Wheel Eye") ability were influenced by the character Hiei in Yoshihiro Togashi's manga series, YuYu Hakusho. Sasuke originally had necklaces and ties around his arms and legs because Kishimoto had a habit of giving characters as much ornamentation as possible; realizing he could not draw such a complex character on a weekly basis, Kishimoto simplified the design to a basic contrast with Naruto's costume. The Chidori (千鳥; lit. "One Thousand Birds") – one of Sasuke and Kakashi Hatake's best-known fighting techniques – originally had a different name that Kishimoto forgot. He found the name "Chidori" and its variant, the "Lightning Blade", appropriate.

Kishimoto considered Sasuke his most challenging character to design and draw. He lacked a clear idea of how his face should look, saying Sasuke seemed older than Naruto, his contemporary, and felt this inconvenience was a result of his inexperience in drawing characters who were mature beyond their years. Sasuke's hair, originally short to save Kishimoto time, slowly grew longer as the series progressed. Mid-way through Part I, he drew a new costume for Sasuke with belts strapped around his arms and legs, but he returned to the character's original design because it took less time to draw. Sasuke is his favorite character to draw despite the time and energy required, and he compared Sasuke with Sakura in difficulty. Kishimoto's superiors sometimes asked him to redraw parts of the manga that did not illustrate Sasuke well.

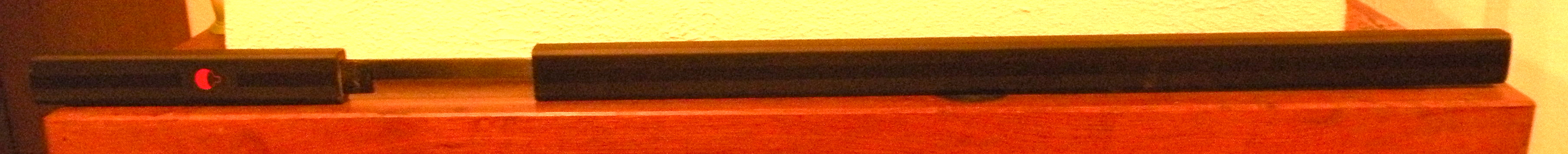
A replica of Sasuke's Kusanagi sword

Kishimoto's design focus for Part II was Sasuke's older appearance. Originally, Kishimoto had wanted to draw him as a more attractive person, but the idea was discarded. An outfit he initially planned combined the younger Sasuke's outfit with new, more modern clothes. Kishimoto tried several other looks, including the use of Shimenawa to evoke the antagonist Orochimaru, and a turtleneck and military uniform to connote cleanliness. He avoided the second option due to similarities with cold weather clothing and eventually chose Japanese clothing and a chokutō sword.

For The Last: Naruto the Movie, Kishimoto gave Sasuke a new, young-adult design with sharper facial features. In contrast with the older Naruto, who cut his hair, Sasuke's hairstyle grew longer to cover part of the character's face. In the original concept, the hair hid Sasuke's mysterious left eye – the Rinnegan (輪廻眼; lit. "Saṃsāra Eye"). According to Kishimoto, he decided to give the character a large hood because Sasuke concealed his identity during the events of the film. Sasuke's design was specifically created to support his actions; the area that showed Sasuke had lost his left arm in the Naruto finale was also covered by his clothes.

=== Personality and voice actors ===
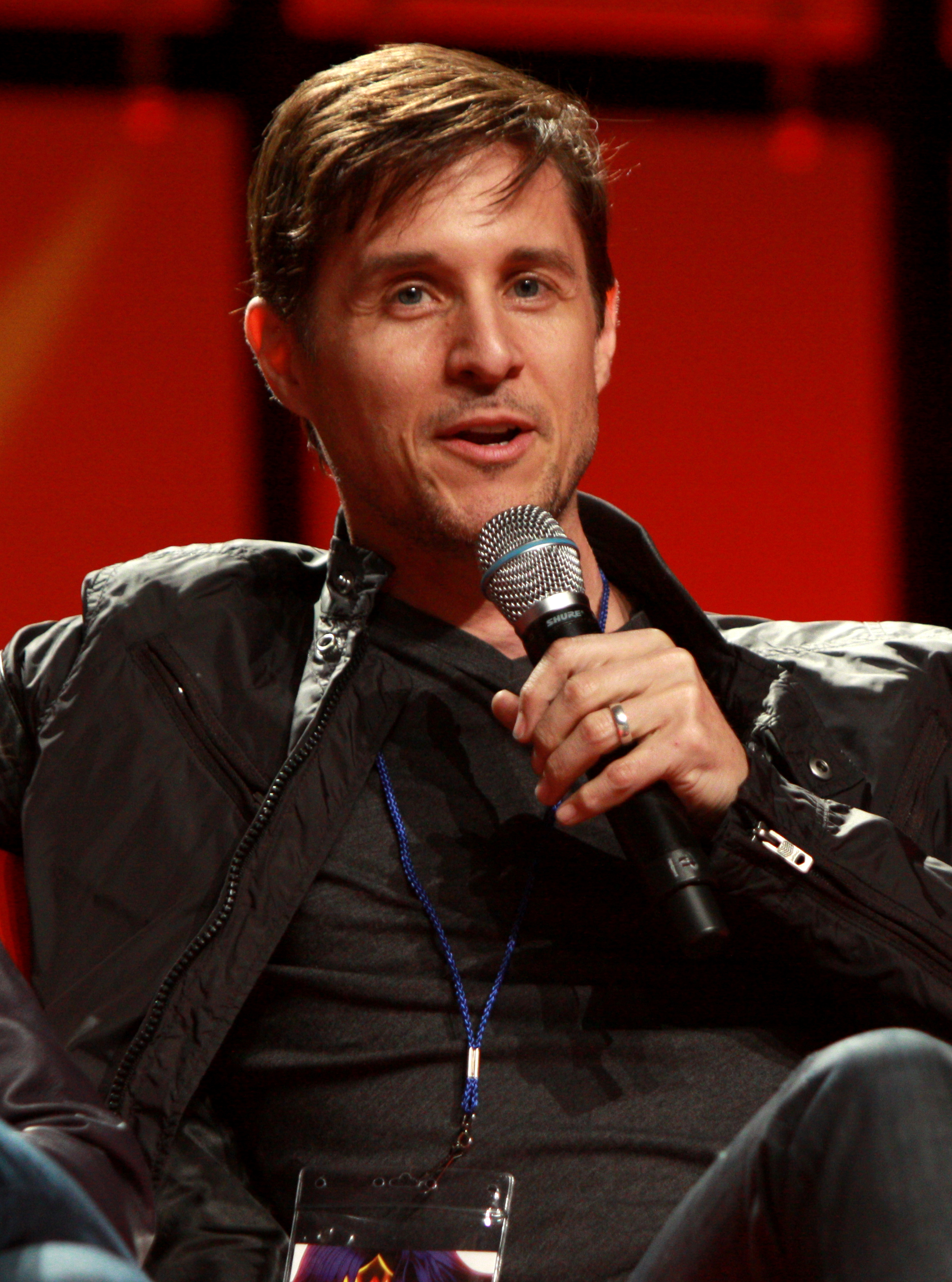
Yuri Lowenthal, voice of Sasuke in the anime's English-language version

Sasuke is voiced by Noriaki Sugiyama in Japanese media. At the beginning of the anime's first part, Sugiyama had difficulty voicing Sasuke because he knew little about his personality; he began to understand the character at the point in the story where Sasuke encounters his brother, Itachi Uchiha. Sugiyama read the manga and became particularly interested in Sasuke's development when the character left Konohagakure; he wanted to revoice some scenes from the anime, including Sasuke's departure from Konohagakure. In Behind the Scenes of Uchiha, a feature about Sasuke and Itachi's backstory, Sugiyama said he had become emotional during the recording sessions of the sixth season of the anime's second part (Naruto: Shippuden), in which Sasuke learns the truth about his brother's role in the massacre of the Uchiha clan.

Sugiyama thought Sasuke's line, "You are annoying," summed up the character's feelings toward Sakura and indicated a change in their relationship each time it was said; although she initially annoys him, he smiles when he repeats it before leaving Konohagakure. Naruto's Japanese voice actress, Junko Takeuchi, said Sasuke's line addressed to Sakura, "See you next time... Thank you," revealed his feelings for her. Sugiyama stated that by the end of the series, Sasuke realized how much he had hurt Sakura's feelings and apologized to her after his final fight against Naruto because of this. While recording for Boruto: Naruto the Movie, Sugiyama expected to see a bond between Sasuke and his apprentice, Boruto Uzumaki. According to Sugiyama, Sasuke's personality had changed for the Boruto anime series, and the actor wanted fans to see the character's interaction with his family. Japanese rock band Scenarioart in charge of performing the ending theme song of this story arc were given directions by Pierrot to make the song show the distant but caring relationship between Sasuke and Sarada. As a result, although the lyrics often mentions the farewells Sasuke and Sarada had, the intention was meant to make it look optimistic as they are destined to meet once again.

Yuri Lowenthal, who voices Sasuke in the English dubs, said he was honored to receive the role since many actors had auditioned for it, and he added that the job was stressful. Although fans were critical of deviations and mistakes in his recordings, he enjoyed voicing the character. His first impression of Sasuke was of "a serious guy dedicated to his training", but his view changed as he learned about the character's backstory. Lowenthal said that some of Sasuke's lines, such as his use of the word "kill", were changed as Viz Media often censored parts of the series' dialogue for Western viewers. As a result, he found the original Japanese version truer to the character.

== Appearances ==
=== In Naruto ===
==== In Part I ====

The three Sharingan phases, Eye of Insight, Eye of Hypnotism, and combined.

Sasuke is introduced in the third chapter of Naruto's manga as a young ninja assigned to become a member of Team 7 alongside his childhood rival Naruto Uzumaki and Sakura Haruno, the latter of whom is infatuated with him. The trio are trained under the guidance of Kakashi Hatake. Although Sasuke is antisocial, cold, and distant, he starts caring about Naruto and Sakura. During a mission, Sasuke awakens his Sharingan – his clan's inherited ability to see through illusions – which allows him to learn imperceptible movements at a superhuman rate. It is revealed later that Sasuke is the sole survivor of the once-powerful Uchiha clan of Konohagakure. He, at the age of seven, survived the massacre of his clan perpetrated by his older brother, Itachi, who spared Sasuke's life because he did not consider him worth killing. Sasuke seeks strong fighting opponents to reassure himself his power is growing.

During a ninja examination meant to improve their ranks, Team 7 encounters Orochimaru, an exile and criminal from Konohagakure who afflicts Sasuke with a Cursed Seal that contains a fragment of Orochimaru's consciousness, which increases Sasuke's physical abilities, but makes him cruel and sadistic. Kakashi teaches Sasuke the lightning-based offensive technique called Chidori in an attempt to appease Sasuke's desire for power. During a siege of Konohagakure, a berserker ninja named Gaara beats Sasuke, who is rescued by Naruto. Shortly afterward, Itachi returns to the village; Sasuke tries to kill him, but he is beaten and tortured instead. Shaken by the experience he decides to leave Team 7 and Konohagakure to become stronger. Thinking Orochimaru's training will make him more powerful, Sasuke becomes an outlaw. Naruto follows him and they fight when Sasuke refuses to return; Sasuke wins, but spares Naruto's life and continues to Orochimaru's hideout.

==== In Part II ====

Sasuke's Mangekyō Sharingan (above) before its transformation to Eternal Mangekyō Sharingan (below)

After two-and-a-half years of training, Sasuke absorbs Orochimaru's power before he can possess his younger body. Following this, Sasuke forms Team Hebi to find Itachi. Itachi and Sasuke fight and Itachi dies at the climax of the battle from an illness after he cured Sasuke from Cursed Seal. Sasuke then meets Tobi, Itachi's superior, who reveals that Itachi killed the Uchiha clan under orders from the Leaf High Council member Danzo Shimura and spared Sasuke out of love rather than contempt. Sasuke rejoins Hebi – which he renames Taka – and declares his intention to destroy his former village in retribution. Due to his brother's death, Sasuke's Sharingan has evolved into a Mangekyo Sharingan (万華鏡写輪眼, Mangekyō Sharingan; lit. "Kaleidoscope Copy Wheel Eye"), giving him powerful new techniques. After he agrees to work temporarily for Tobi's terrorist organization, Akatsuki, Sasuke becomes a rogue ninja and criminal. He kills Danzo, the now acting Hokage with Tobi's aid. Sasuke is confronted by his former Team 7 colleagues, and Naruto challenges him to a death match.

Sasuke's Rinnegan

Sasuke initially prepares to fight Naruto but instead decides to protect Konohagakure after he encounters the re-animated bodies of Itachi and the First Hokage Hashirama Senju. He rejoins Team 7 and fights the Ten-Tails monster that is controlled by the masterminds behind Akatsuki. Sasuke inherits the Rinnegan – a legendary eye technique – from the spirit of the Sage of the Six Paths Hagoromo Otsutsuki, the Founder of Shinobi. Team 7 fights and seals an ancient being called Kaguya Otsutsuki – Hagoromo's mother – who created the Ten-Tails. Sasuke then fights Naruto alone to settle their village's future; when he loses his left arm, Sasuke admits his defeat and reconciles with Naruto. Sasuke then destroys Akatsuki's illusion placed on mankind with his Rinnegan. He is pardoned for his crimes by Kakashi – the current Sixth Hokage – and decides to travel the world in search of redemption. Before leaving, he says farewell to both Sakura and Naruto with gratitude. By the end of the manga, having briefly returned to the village, Sasuke is revealed to have married Sakura who is raising their daughter Sarada Uchiha.

=== In the Boruto franchise ===
In the Naruto spin-off manga, Naruto: The Seventh Hokage and the Scarlet Spring, and the Boruto: Naruto Next Generations anime (2017), Sasuke has left Konohagakure sometime after Sarada's birth on a secret mission to investigate a possible threat relating to Kaguya, traveling across the world and Kaguya's dimensions for clues while aiding the other villages in secret. In the Boruto anime, Sasuke briefly returns to his village before the arc begins and asks Naruto to offer Sakura his apologies. He rejoins Naruto to oppose Orochimaru's former test subject Shin, who takes the Uchiha surname for his own while seeking to avenge Itachi and revive the Akatsuki to end the peace. After defeating Shin and his clone children, Sasuke bonds with his daughter for the first time and resumes his mission. A novel by Mirei Miyamoto focuses on Sasuke's work in his village where he replaces Konohamaru Sarutobi as the leader of Boruto, Sarada, and Mitsuki's team. Another novel which is being adapted into a manga is focused on Sasuke and Sakura. The theme of Sasuke's novel is that of "a married couple's view on life and death".

In Boruto: Naruto the Movie, also covered in both the Boruto manga and anime, Sasuke returns to Konohagakure to warn Naruto of the threat posed by Kaguya's kinsmen Momoshiki Otsutsuki and Kinshiki Otsutsuki, who seek the tailed beast chakra for their end. He meets Naruto's son, Boruto Uzumaki, and becomes the boy's mentor once having him learn to use his father's Rasengan (螺旋丸; lit. spiral sphere, English manga: "Spiral Chakra Sphere"). When the Otsutsuki members abduct Naruto during the Chunin Exam, Sasuke is accompanied by Boruto as he and the Kage – the leaders of the ninja villages – travel to Momoshiki's planet to save Naruto. Sasuke then aids Naruto and Boruto in defeating Momoshiki, who absorbs Kinshiki to increase his power. After Momoshiki's defeat, Sasuke notices the enemy has placed a seal called Karma on Boruto. The anime has Sasuke searching Urashiki Otsutsuki alongside Gaara. Sasuke later discovers the connection between Kara and the Otsutsuki clan, finding that Kara possesses a Ten Tails in an alternate dimension, and then faces the leader of Kara, Jigen, together with Naruto, but the pair are badly beaten, with Sasuke being forced to escape as Naruto is sealed. Not long after Naruto is freed by Boruto and his team, the village is invaded by Isshiki Otsutsuki, Jigen's true identity, who is searching for Kawaki. Immediately after Isshiki's lifespan runs out during the battle, Sasuke loses his Rinnegan to surprise assault from Momoshiki, possessing Boruto's body, but Sasuke and Kawaki help restore Boruto's consciousness.

Sasuke investigates the whereabouts of Code, the final member of Kara, and after returning to the village, Kawaki seals Naruto and Hinata in another dimension, and tries to kill Boruto. Sasuke arrives to stop him, but Momoshiki possesses Boruto for just a moment, allowing Kawaki to escape. Just after that, former Kara collaborator Eida accidentally alters reality using her power of Omnipotence, swapping the memories of almost the entire planet, about Boruto and Kawaki. Sasuke finds Sarada, who was not affected by the memory swap, begging her father to rescue Boruto, so he decides to trust his daughter over his own fake memories, and saves Boruto from the village. The two, seen as traitors, depart the village and train, and after a year, are attacked by Code and his army of Ten Tails clones. Boruto escapes, but Sasuke is defeated, and his chakra is devoured by a Ten Tails clone, leading to Sasuke being sealed and turned into a tree. Two years later, an evolved Divine Tree creature with Sasuke's chakra spawns, named Hidari, who seeks to devour Sarada.

=== In other media ===
Sasuke appears in the first four original video animations (OVAs) produced for the series. In the first episode, he helps Naruto and Konohamaru find a four-leaf clover; in the second, he joins Naruto's team for a mission; he participates in a tournament in the third; and he works with Team 7 in the fourth. One OVA presents an alternate fight between Sasuke and Naruto in Naruto: Shippuden. The character is present in the first two Naruto feature films; he guards a princess in Naruto the Movie: Ninja Clash in the Land of Snow (2004) and makes a brief appearance in a flashback in Naruto the Movie: Legend of the Stone of Gelel (2005). The first Part II film in which he appears is Naruto Shippuden 2: Bonds (2008). The sixth Part II film, Road to Ninja: Naruto the Movie (2012), contains a flirtatious, alternate-reality version of Sasuke. In The Last: Naruto the Movie (2014), an adult Sasuke returns briefly to Konohagakure to protect it from a meteor. A chibi version of Sasuke appears in comedic spin-off Rock Lee & His Ninja Pals.

He is a recurring character in the Naruto light novels and the protagonist of the manga Naruto Jinraiden: The Day the Wolf Howled (2012), which explores Sasuke's reflections after Itachi's death and his decision to destroy Konohagakure. In Sakura Hiden (2015), an adult Sasuke continues his journey of redemption but returns to Konohagakure out of concern for Sakura's safety. In Akatsuki Hiden (2015), Sasuke meets two children who tell him stories about Akatsuki, and they discuss Itachi's legacy. He is the protagonist of Sasuke Shinden (2015); he agrees to aid Konohagakure by investigating a series of disappearances, which he solves with the help of Taka and a Konohagakure ninja named Sai. Sasuke is also the protagonist of manga artist Kenji Taira's Naruto spin-off, Sasuke Uchiha's Sharingan Legend (2014), in which he and Taka search for Itachi. According to Taira, Sasuke would be characterized as an "idiot." A new novel focused on Sasuke's life as an adult alongside Sakura, Sasuke Retsuden: The Uchiha Descendants and the Heavenly Stardust (2019), was written by Jun Esaka.

Sasuke is a playable character in Naruto video games, including the Clash of Ninja and Ultimate Ninja series. His Cursed Seal can be unlocked and activated in some games. Due to his absence from early Naruto: Shippuden episodes, Sasuke has not appeared in any games based on Naruto: Shippuden until the launch of Gekitō Ninja Taisen! EX 2 and Ultimate Ninja 5 (2007). Sasuke is also present in crossover games, such as Jump Super Stars (2005), Battle Stadium D.O.N (2006), Jump Ultimate Stars (2006), J-Stars Victory VS (2014), and Jump Force (2019). In November 2021, Sasuke, alongside Kakashi, Sakura, and Naruto were all featured as skins in the popular battle royale game Fortnite.

== Cultural impact ==
=== Characterization and themes ===
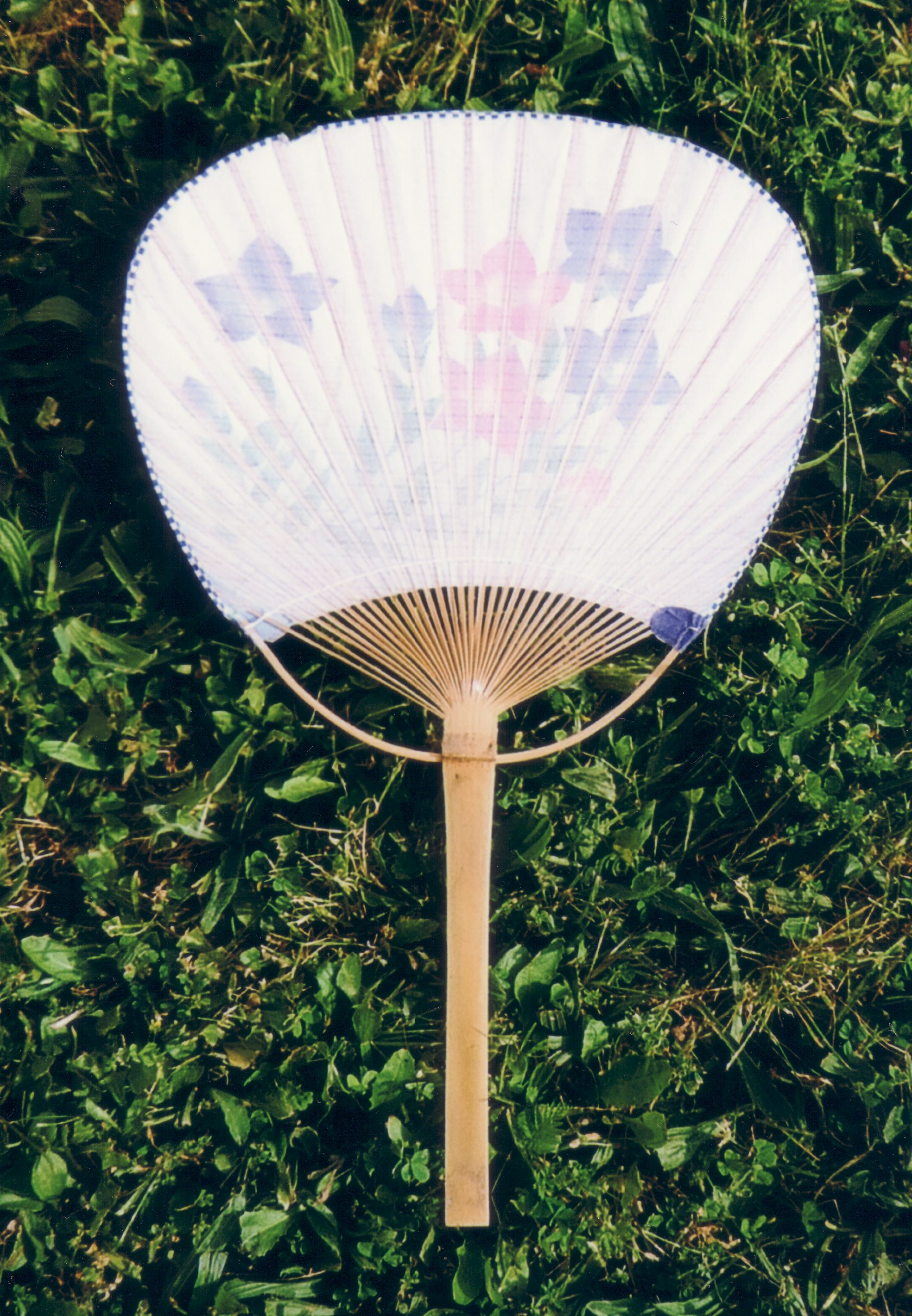
The Eastern fan (uchiwa) is Sasuke's clan symbol.

Lowenthal said in 2010 that Sasuke was one of the first dark characters he voiced, adding, "He's sort of a hero, but he's not the naïve, young white–hat hero." Scholars have also analyzed the character. In El Anime como elemento de Transculturación, Sasuke's corruption from a friend of the main character to his antagonist is considered one of the major interests in the narrative as it causes Naruto a dilemma about whether or not he will have to kill him during his growth as a ninja, making it one of the best written storylines presented in the narrative. According to a study of readers' abilities to predict character types based on physical cues, Sasuke was classified as an INTJ (Myers-Briggs) character type, making him a foil for Naruto. Rik Spanjers regarded Sasuke's dissimilarity to Naruto as tragic but wrote that the contrast between the protagonists' approaches to the world was fundamental to the plot: "Naruto's strength grows as he gains more loved ones to protect, while Sasuke remains alone and is increasingly absorbed by his quest for revenge". According to academic Amy Plumb, Kishimoto's references to Japanese mythology in Naruto, including the heraldic symbol of Sasuke's clan – a fan known as an uchiwa – added layers to the story and Sasuke's ability to 'blow away' the Nine-Tailed Fox's influence on Naruto resembled the mythological use of the fan to dispel evil. Beatriz Peña viewed Sasuke's antagonism in the series as a result of the war theme often shown throughout the story, with the Uchihas having been slaughtered due to a possible civil war against Konohagakure, which expanded the connection between him and Naruto. My Hero Academia author Kōhei Horikoshi praised the portrayal of Sasuke alongside Naruto in the beginning as in the bodyguard mission it is made clear that Sasuke is willing to fight against several enemies while Naruto instead feels fear, being motivated to avoid acting like this again.

Tejal Suhas Bagwe from Dissertation Submitted in Partial Fulfillment for the Degree of Masters of Arts in English describes the usage of god themed techniques within the Uchihas as major references to Japanese mythology especially when awakening the stronger Mangekyo Sharingan. Another reference is how Orochimaru becomes the mythical Yamata-no-Orochi during Sasuke's fight against Itachi who seals Orochimaru through his own Susanoo similar to the myth. The series' final antagonist, Kaguya Otsutsuki, is based on Kaguya Hime. Similar to the references of the Sharingans, Kaguya also references Japanese mythology, with both Sasuke and Naruto being the descendants of her children in a similar fashion to Amaterasu, the powerful Goddess of the Sun, and Susanoo, the God of thunder. The contrasting relations between these two characters is a common theme within the manga, as not only this is explored through Naruto and Sasuke but also through the two other connected ninjas, Hashirama Senju and Madara Uchiha. Antônio Guilherme Bernardes Galletti from University of São Paulo notes Boruto starts noticing the different skills his father possesses when Sasuke has him try to learn the Rasengan which makes the skilled student find a challenging training in his life for the first time. The film makes Boruto's character become complex when learning of the shinobi code his father and master use which was also compared to the samurais' bushido while developing a sense of individuality when deciding what to do with his life when growing up.

Reviewing the series' first part, writers said they enjoyed Sasuke's fights but disapproved of his dark personality, which resembled the stereotypical rival in shōnen manga. Jason Thompson wrote that Sasuke had not become evil despite siding with the antagonist Orochimaru, lending ambiguity to his character. Writers believed Sasuke's fights during the story's first part's climax against Naruto second part had a major impact on the plot and the character, and they regarded his battles as some of the franchise's best. Screen Rant said Sasuke had the most satisfying victory in anime history when forcing Danzo's suicide attack as the elder was not only responsible for orchestrated the Uchiha Clan massacre but also betrayed other nations when escaping from the Kage meeting despite having taken the role of the new Hokage.

The character's growth into since leaving the village and constant dynamic with the protagonist had Screen Rant calling them the two second best duo in anime considering he would go on to heavily assist Naruto by working for the village in his wanderings since exiling himself in the manga's ending. The character's possible mortal fate in the fight against Kara was found by IGN to be a common commentary within readers who feared Sasuke dying in the narrative based on build up where he tells Boruto he and Naruto are ready to die protecting the village. The storyline Sasuke Retsuden where Sasuke questions his marriage due to his constant wanderings resulted positive reactions from the media as he gives Sakura an engagement ring and the couple start acting commonly. Critics also commented that Sasuke had become more caring toward his daughter, and they said the Boruto anime had developed Sasuke as a father and a husband and had solidified his relationship with his wife, Sakura, Writers considered his fight scenes in Boruto: Naruto the Movie and in particular his teamwork with Naruto to be the best parts of the film, with its television series also received critical acclaimed to the point of finding as appealing as the final fight from Shippuden between Sasuke and Naruto.

=== Popularity ===
A popularity poll on the Japanese website Charapedia ranked Sasuke and Naruto's rivalry as the best in anime. At New York's 2015 Comic Con, moderator Christopher Butcher and editor Jo Otsuki commented that Sasuke had become the series' most popular character, and Otsuki called him his favorite. Butcher wondered whether readers considered Sasuke a more-relatable character after he had embraced Naruto's positive outlook on life in the series finale. According to Otsuki, fans regarded Sasuke's character and abilities as "cooler" than those of his rival. Jacob Hope of Anime News Network listed Sasuke and Naruto as two of the "Fiercest Frenemies" in anime due to their resemblance despite being adversaries and their need to engage in a mortal fight to become friends. In a Tokyo Otaku Mode poll, Sasuke was deemed the sixth best character women would want to have a date with. IGN also listed him as one of the ten best rivals in anime in general, while a poll from Anime! Anime! listed Naruto and him as one of the best rivals turned into allies. American rapper Lil Uzi Vert cited Sasuke as their favorite character from the franchise and dedicated a song to the character. In a Viz Media fan poll from 2021, Sasuke was voted as the fifth best character from Boruto: Naruto Next Generations.

=== Merchandise ===
Sasuke merchandise includes key chains and figurines. Boruto film audiences were offered fans bearing images of Sasuke and his daughter, Sarada. To promote the video game Naruto Shippuden: Ultimate Ninja Storm 4, two 1/6-scale statues depicting Sasuke and Naruto during their final clash from the series were developed by Luxembourgian company Tsume.

Japanese toy company Bandai released an action figure of Sasuke performing the Chidori move. In May 2017, Bandai launched a figurine of Sasuke performing his Susanoo eye technique, which represents the god of thunder Raijin. Studio Pierrot released artwork that was sold alongside this figure. Bandai also produced a limited-edition adult figurine of Sasuke as he appears in the Naruto finale and the Boruto franchise, which impressed Scott Green, a writer for Ain't It Cool News and Crunchyroll.
