= CyberConnect2 =

Japanese video game developer

CyberConnect2 Co., Ltd.
- Native name: 株式会社サイバーコネクトツー
- Romanized name: Kabushiki gaisha Saibā Konekuto Tsū
- Formerly: CyberConnect (1996–2001)
- Type: Kabushiki gaisha
- Industry: Video games
- Founded: February 16, 1996; 30 years ago
- Headquarters: Fukuoka, Japan
- Key people: Hiroshi Matsuyama (President and CEO); Taichiro Miyazaki (vice president)
- Products: Little Tail Bronx series.hack// series Naruto Ultimate Ninja series Asura's Wrath
- Number of employees: 272 (as of February 2025)
- Subsidiaries: CyberConnect2 Tokyo; CyberConnect2 Osaka
- Website: www.cc2.co.jp

CyberConnect2 Co., Ltd. (株式会社サイバーコネクトツー, Kabushiki gaisha Saibā Konekuto Tsū) is a Japanese video game developer. They are closely affiliated with Bandai Namco Entertainment (formerly Bandai), being best known for its work with the company on the .hack series, along with a series of fighting games based on the Naruto franchise. They are also known for creating the Little Tail Bronx series (e.g. Tail Concerto, Solatorobo: Red the Hunter and Fuga: Melodies of Steel). In 2016, it expanded its workforce into the international market by opening a studio in Montreal, Canada; however, the studio ceased operations in July 2023 after seven years of service.

== History ==
CyberConnect2 was first formed on February 16, 1996, as CyberConnect in Fukuoka, Japan. On September 16, 2001, it was renamed CyberConnect2. On October 3, 2007, CyberConnect2 changed its logo and expanded its production beyond games, beginning with the formation of Sensible Art Innovation to create the .hack//G.U. Trilogy, and LieN to compose the music.

CyberConnect2 opened a second studio in Tokyo in 2010, and later opened its first international studio in Montreal, Canada in 2016. However, it was announced the Montreal studio would close its doors by the end of July 2023. In July 2023, it was announced that a third studio in Osaka will open in early 2024.

CyberConnect2 was tasked with developing the Final Fantasy VII Remake, described in CyberConnect2's March 2015 Famitsu job advertisement as a photo-realistic role-playing game targeted at the international market built on the Unreal Engine 4 involving physically based rendering. In May 2017, it was announced that they had left the project due to unreasonable management from above, and Square Enix moved the remaining development of Final Fantasy VII Remake in-house.

== List of video games ==
Release date	Title	Platform(s)	Publisher(s)
April 16, 1998	Tail Concerto	PlayStation	Bandai
October 28, 1999	Silent Bomber	PlayStation	Bandai
June 20, 2002	.hack//Infection	PlayStation 2	Bandai
September 9, 2002	.hack//Mutation	PlayStation 2	Bandai
December 12, 2002	.hack//Outbreak	PlayStation 2	Bandai
April 10, 2003	.hack//Quarantine	PlayStation 2	Bandai
October 23, 2003	Naruto: Ultimate Ninja	PlayStation 2	Bandai
September 30, 2004	Naruto: Ultimate Ninja 2	PlayStation 2	Bandai
November 23, 2005	.hack//frägment	PlayStation 2	Bandai
December 22, 2005	Naruto: Ultimate Ninja 3	PlayStation 2	Bandai
March 30, 2006	Naruto: Ultimate Ninja Heroes 2: The Phantom Fortress	PlayStation Portable	Bandai
October 24, 2006	.hack//G.U. Vol. 1//Rebirth	PlayStation 2	Bandai Namco Games
April 5, 2007	Naruto Shippuden: Ultimate Ninja 4	PlayStation 2	Bandai Namco Games
May 8, 2007	.hack//G.U. Vol. 2//Reminisce	PlayStation 2	Bandai Namco Games
August 28, 2007	Naruto: Ultimate Ninja Heroes	PlayStation 2	Bandai Namco Games
September 10, 2007	.hack//G.U. Vol. 3//Redemption	PlayStation 2	Bandai Namco Games
December 20, 2007	Naruto Shippuden: Ultimate Ninja 5	PlayStation 2	Bandai Namco Games
November 4, 2008	Naruto: Ultimate Ninja Storm	PlayStation 3	Bandai Namco Games
December 10, 2009	Naruto Shippuden: Ultimate Ninja Heroes 3	PlayStation Portable	Bandai Namco Games
March 4, 2010	.hack//Link	PlayStation Portable	Bandai Namco Games
October 14, 2010	Naruto Shippuden: Ultimate Ninja Storm 2	PlayStation 3	Bandai Namco Games
October 14, 2010	Naruto Shippuden: Ultimate Ninja Storm 2	Xbox 360	Bandai Namco Games
October 28, 2010	Solatorobo: Red the Hunter	Nintendo DS	Bandai Namco Games
October 20, 2011	Naruto Shippuden: Ultimate Ninja Impact	PlayStation Portable	Bandai Namco Games
February 21, 2012	Asura's Wrath	PlayStation 3	Capcom
February 21, 2012	Asura's Wrath	Xbox 360	Capcom
February 23, 2012	Naruto Shippuden: Ultimate Ninja Storm Generations	PlayStation 3	Bandai Namco Games
February 23, 2012	Naruto Shippuden: Ultimate Ninja Storm Generations	Xbox 360	Bandai Namco Games
June 28, 2012	.hack//Versus	PlayStation 3	Bandai Namco Games
March 5, 2013	Naruto Shippuden: Ultimate Ninja Storm 3	PlayStation 3	Bandai Namco Games
March 5, 2013	Naruto Shippuden: Ultimate Ninja Storm 3	Xbox 360	Bandai Namco Games
August 29, 2013	JoJo's Bizarre Adventure: All Star Battle	PlayStation 3	Bandai Namco Games
April 23, 2013	Shadow Escaper	Android	
April 23, 2013	Shadow Escaper	iOS	
2013	Naruto Online	Browser	Bandai Namco Games, Tencent Games, Oasis Games
March 3, 2014	Shinigami Messiah	Android	
March 3, 2014	Shinigami Messiah	iOS	
March 25, 2014	Little Tail Story	Android	Bandai Namco Games
March 25, 2014	Little Tail Story	iOS	Bandai Namco Games
September 11, 2014	Naruto Shippuden: Ultimate Ninja Storm Revolution	PlayStation 3	Bandai Namco Games
September 11, 2014	Naruto Shippuden: Ultimate Ninja Storm Revolution	Xbox 360	Bandai Namco Games
September 15, 2014	Naruto Shippuden: Ultimate Ninja Storm Revolution	Microsoft Windows	Bandai Namco Games
October 30, 2014	Final Fantasy VII G-Bike	Android	Square Enix
October 30, 2014	Final Fantasy VII G-Bike	iOS	Square Enix
March 30, 2015	FullBokko Heroes X	Android	Drecom
March 30, 2015	FullBokko Heroes X	iOS	Drecom
December 17, 2015	JoJo's Bizarre Adventure: Eyes of Heaven	PlayStation 3	Bandai Namco Entertainment
December 17, 2015	JoJo's Bizarre Adventure: Eyes of Heaven	PlayStation 4	Bandai Namco Entertainment
January 8, 2016	.hack//New World	Android	Bandai Namco Entertainment
January 8, 2016	.hack//New World	iOS	Bandai Namco Entertainment
February 4, 2016	Naruto Shippuden: Ultimate Ninja Storm 4	PlayStation 4	Bandai Namco Entertainment
February 4, 2016	Naruto Shippuden: Ultimate Ninja Storm 4	Xbox One	Bandai Namco Entertainment
February 5, 2016	Naruto Shippuden: Ultimate Ninja Storm 4	Microsoft Windows	Bandai Namco Entertainment
April 23, 2020	Naruto Shippuden: Ultimate Ninja Storm 4	Nintendo Switch	Bandai Namco Entertainment
July 27, 2017	Naruto Shippuden: Ultimate Ninja Storm Trilogy	PlayStation 4	Bandai Namco Entertainment
August 25, 2017	Naruto Shippuden: Ultimate Ninja Storm Trilogy	Microsoft Windows	Bandai Namco Entertainment
August 25, 2017	Naruto Shippuden: Ultimate Ninja Storm Trilogy	Xbox One	Bandai Namco Entertainment
April 26, 2018	Naruto Shippuden: Ultimate Ninja Storm Trilogy	Nintendo Switch	Bandai Namco Entertainment
September 25, 2024	Naruto Shippuden: Ultimate Ninja Storm Trilogy	Android	Bandai Namco Entertainment
September 25, 2024	Naruto Shippuden: Ultimate Ninja Storm Trilogy	iOS	Bandai Namco Entertainment
November 1, 2017	.hack//G.U. Last Recode	Microsoft Windows	Bandai Namco Entertainment
November 1, 2017	.hack//G.U. Last Recode	PlayStation 4	Bandai Namco Entertainment
March 10, 2022	.hack//G.U. Last Recode	Nintendo Switch	Bandai Namco Entertainment
January 17, 2020	Dragon Ball Z: Kakarot	Microsoft Windows	Bandai Namco Entertainment
January 17, 2020	Dragon Ball Z: Kakarot	PlayStation 4	Bandai Namco Entertainment
January 17, 2020	Dragon Ball Z: Kakarot	Xbox One	Bandai Namco Entertainment
September 24, 2021	Dragon Ball Z: Kakarot	Nintendo Switch	Bandai Namco Entertainment
January 13, 2023	Dragon Ball Z: Kakarot	PlayStation 5	Bandai Namco Entertainment
January 13, 2023	Dragon Ball Z: Kakarot	Xbox Series X/S	Bandai Namco Entertainment
July 29, 2021	Fuga: Melodies of Steel	Microsoft Windows	CyberConnect2
July 29, 2021	Fuga: Melodies of Steel	Nintendo Switch	CyberConnect2
July 29, 2021	Fuga: Melodies of Steel	PlayStation 4	CyberConnect2
July 29, 2021	Fuga: Melodies of Steel	PlayStation 5	CyberConnect2
July 29, 2021	Fuga: Melodies of Steel	Xbox One	CyberConnect2
July 29, 2021	Fuga: Melodies of Steel	Xbox Series X/S	CyberConnect2
July 29, 2026	Fuga: Melodies of Steel	iOS	CyberConnect2
July 29, 2026	Fuga: Melodies of Steel	Android	CyberConnect2
October 15, 2021	Demon Slayer: Kimetsu no Yaiba – The Hinokami Chronicles	PlayStation 4	Aniplex, Sega
October 15, 2021	Demon Slayer: Kimetsu no Yaiba – The Hinokami Chronicles	PlayStation 5	Aniplex, Sega
October 15, 2021	Demon Slayer: Kimetsu no Yaiba – The Hinokami Chronicles	Xbox One	Aniplex, Sega
October 15, 2021	Demon Slayer: Kimetsu no Yaiba – The Hinokami Chronicles	Xbox Series X/S	Aniplex, Sega
October 15, 2021	Demon Slayer: Kimetsu no Yaiba – The Hinokami Chronicles	Microsoft Windows	Aniplex, Sega
June 10, 2022	Demon Slayer: Kimetsu no Yaiba – The Hinokami Chronicles	Nintendo Switch	Aniplex, Sega
September 2, 2022	JoJo's Bizarre Adventure: All Star Battle R	Microsoft Windows	Bandai Namco Entertainment
September 2, 2022	JoJo's Bizarre Adventure: All Star Battle R	Nintendo Switch	Bandai Namco Entertainment
September 2, 2022	JoJo's Bizarre Adventure: All Star Battle R	PlayStation 4	Bandai Namco Entertainment
September 2, 2022	JoJo's Bizarre Adventure: All Star Battle R	Xbox One	Bandai Namco Entertainment
September 2, 2022	JoJo's Bizarre Adventure: All Star Battle R	PlayStation 5	Bandai Namco Entertainment
September 2, 2022	JoJo's Bizarre Adventure: All Star Battle R	Xbox Series X/S	Bandai Namco Entertainment
May 11, 2023	Fuga: Melodies of Steel 2	Microsoft Windows	CyberConnect2
May 11, 2023	Fuga: Melodies of Steel 2	Nintendo Switch	CyberConnect2
May 11, 2023	Fuga: Melodies of Steel 2	PlayStation 4	CyberConnect2
May 11, 2023	Fuga: Melodies of Steel 2	PlayStation 5	CyberConnect2
May 11, 2023	Fuga: Melodies of Steel 2	Xbox One	CyberConnect2
May 11, 2023	Fuga: Melodies of Steel 2	Xbox Series X/S	CyberConnect2
November 16, 2023	Naruto x Boruto: Ultimate Ninja Storm Connections	Microsoft Windows	Bandai Namco Entertainment
November 16, 2023	Naruto x Boruto: Ultimate Ninja Storm Connections	Nintendo Switch	Bandai Namco Entertainment
November 16, 2023	Naruto x Boruto: Ultimate Ninja Storm Connections	PlayStation 4	Bandai Namco Entertainment
November 16, 2023	Naruto x Boruto: Ultimate Ninja Storm Connections	PlayStation 5	Bandai Namco Entertainment
November 16, 2023	Naruto x Boruto: Ultimate Ninja Storm Connections	Xbox One	Bandai Namco Entertainment
November 16, 2023	Naruto x Boruto: Ultimate Ninja Storm Connections	Xbox Series X/S	Bandai Namco Entertainment
April 26, 2024	Demon Slayer: Kimetsu no Yaiba – Sweep the Board	Nintendo Switch	Aniplex, Sega
July 16, 2024	Demon Slayer: Kimetsu no Yaiba – Sweep the Board	Microsoft Windows	Aniplex, Sega
July 16, 2024	Demon Slayer: Kimetsu no Yaiba – Sweep the Board	PlayStation 4	Aniplex, Sega
July 16, 2024	Demon Slayer: Kimetsu no Yaiba – Sweep the Board	PlayStation 5	Aniplex, Sega
July 16, 2024	Demon Slayer: Kimetsu no Yaiba – Sweep the Board	Xbox One	Aniplex, Sega
July 16, 2024	Demon Slayer: Kimetsu no Yaiba – Sweep the Board	Xbox Series X/S	Aniplex, Sega
May 29, 2025	Fuga: Melodies of Steel 3	Microsoft Windows	CyberConnect2
May 29, 2025	Fuga: Melodies of Steel 3	Nintendo Switch	CyberConnect2
May 29, 2025	Fuga: Melodies of Steel 3	PlayStation 4	CyberConnect2
May 29, 2025	Fuga: Melodies of Steel 3	PlayStation 5	CyberConnect2
May 29, 2025	Fuga: Melodies of Steel 3	Xbox One	CyberConnect2
May 29, 2025	Fuga: Melodies of Steel 3	Xbox Series X/S	CyberConnect2
August 5, 2025	Demon Slayer: Kimetsu no Yaiba – The Hinokami Chronicles 2	Microsoft Windows	Aniplex, Sega
August 5, 2025	Demon Slayer: Kimetsu no Yaiba – The Hinokami Chronicles 2	Nintendo Switch	Aniplex, Sega
August 5, 2025	Demon Slayer: Kimetsu no Yaiba – The Hinokami Chronicles 2	PlayStation 4	Aniplex, Sega
August 5, 2025	Demon Slayer: Kimetsu no Yaiba – The Hinokami Chronicles 2	PlayStation 5	Aniplex, Sega
August 5, 2025	Demon Slayer: Kimetsu no Yaiba – The Hinokami Chronicles 2	Xbox One	Aniplex, Sega
August 5, 2025	Demon Slayer: Kimetsu no Yaiba – The Hinokami Chronicles 2	Xbox Series X/S	Aniplex, Sega
TBA	Cecile	Microsoft Windows	CyberConnect2
TBA	Cecile	Nintendo Switch	CyberConnect2
TBA	Cecile	PlayStation 4	CyberConnect2
TBA	Cecile	Xbox One	CyberConnect2
TBA	Tokyo Ogre Gate	Microsoft Windows	CyberConnect2
TBA	Tokyo Ogre Gate	Nintendo Switch	CyberConnect2
TBA	Tokyo Ogre Gate	PlayStation 4	CyberConnect2
TBA	Tokyo Ogre Gate	Xbox One	CyberConnect2
TBA	.hack//Z.E.R.O.	TBA	CyberConnect2

== Films ==
CyberConnect2 also produced two animated films for the .hack franchise. The first one, .hack//G.U. Trilogy, is an adaptation of the .hack//G.U. games and was released in December 2007. The second film is .hack//The Movie, which was released on January 21, 2012.
