= List of Naruto chapters (Part II, volumes 28–48) =

The cover of the second box set of the Naruto manga, the first half of the Part II storyline.

The Naruto manga series, written and illustrated by Masashi Kishimoto, is split in two parts to divide the storyline; the second part is simply known as Part II. The plot follows the return of the ninja Naruto Uzumaki to Konohagakure, after two and a half years of training after leaving his teammates Sakura Haruno and Kakashi Hatake, and his subsequent efforts to make his best friend, Sasuke Uchiha, return with him and his friends. However, the criminal organization Akatsuki begins to hunt Naruto to get the Nine-Tailed Demon Fox that is sealed within him.

Part II starts at chapter 245 and is set two and a half years after the conclusion of chapter 238 in Part I. Chapters 239 through 244 form a gaiden set before the Naruto manga and detail part of Kakashi Hatake's history. All subsequent chapters are considered to be part of the Part II storyline. Naruto is published in individual chapters by Shueisha in Weekly Shōnen Jump and is later collected in tankōbon format with various extras. While the series started serialization in issue 43 of 1999, Part II started in issue 19 of 2005. Volume 28, the first volume of Part II, was released on June 3, 2005, while volume 48 was released on November 4, 2009.

An anime adaptation of Part II, produced by Studio Pierrot and TV Tokyo, started to air on February 15, 2007, on TV Tokyo under the name Naruto Shippuden (NARUTO -ナルト- 疾風伝, Naruto Shippūden; literally, Naruto: Hurricane Chronicles). These episodes began to air immediately after the end of the original Naruto anime, which had been showing filler episodes in order to widen the plot gap between the anime and the manga.

The English serialization of the Naruto manga is licensed by Viz Media and is currently published simultaneously in North America in the Weekly Shonen Jump digital magazine. It was originally serialized in the now-defunct monthly Shonen Jump print magazine. English language trade volumes are published both in print and digitally through Viz Media's website. In order to compensate for occasional gaps between the Japanese and English adaptations of the manga, Viz Media has periodically announced special campaigns during which they release several volumes within a relatively short period of time. Volume 28 was released in English by Viz Media on March 4, 2008, and volume 48 was released on June 1, 2010. The second box set containing the volumes from the first half of Part II was released in the United States by Viz Media on July 7, 2015.

== Volume list ==
No.	Title	Original release date	English release date
28	Homecoming; Naruto no kikyō!! (ナルトの帰郷!!)	June 3, 2005; 978-4-08-873828-4	March 4, 2008; 978-1-4215-1864-0
245. "Homecoming!!" (ナルトの帰郷!!, "Naruto no kikyō!!"); 246. "My, How They've Grown!!" (二人の成長!! "Futari no seichō!!"); 247. "Intruders in the Sand" (砂への侵入者たち "Suna e no shinnyūsha-tachi"); 248. "The Sand Strike Back...!!" (迎えうつ砂...!! "Mukaeutsu suna...!!"); 249. "The Kazekage Stands Tall...!!" (風影として...!! "Kazekage to shite...!!"); 250. "New Squad, First Mission!!" (新チーム、初任務!! "Shin chīmu, hatsu ninmu!!"); 251. "To the Sand...!!" (砂へ...!! "Suna e...!!"); 252. "Feelings Run Wild...!!" (想い、駆ける...!! "Omoi, kakeru...!!"); 253. "Reinforcements...!!" (頼れる加勢...!! "Tayoreru kasei...!!")
After two-and-a-half years of training abroad, Naruto Uzumaki returns to his hometown of Konohagakure. Coinciding with his return, the criminal organization Akatsuki becomes more active in its quest to capture all of the tailed beasts. For this task, Akatsuki members Sasori and Deidara capture Gaara of Sunagakure. They succeed in their task and flee the village with Gaara. Upon hearing of this, Naruto is reunited with Sakura Haruno and their mentor Kakashi Hatake, their group renamed Team Kakashi, on a mission to save Gaara.
29	Kakashi vs. Itachi カカシVSイタチ!!	August 4, 2005; 978-4-08-873849-9	May 6, 2008; 978-1-4215-1865-7
254. "Siblings...!!" (兄弟...!!, "Kyōdai...!!"); 255. "Approach...!!" (接近...!! "Sekkin...!!"); 256. "Enemies!!" (立ちはだかる者たち!! "Tachi wa dakaru mono-tachi!!"); 257. "Kakashi Comes Through" (カカシの経験値 "Kakashi no keiken atai"); 258. "Guy vs. Kisame!!" (ガイVS鬼鮫!! "Gai VS Kisame"); 259. "The Power of Itachi...!!" (イタチの力...!! "Itachi no chikara...!!"); 260. "Kakashi vs. Itachi!!" (カカシVSイタチ!!); 261. "Jinchûriki Host...!!" (人柱力...!! "Jinchūriki...!!"); 262. "Naruto Charges On...!!" (駆ける思い...!! "Kakeru omoi...!!")
During a brief pitstop in Sunagakure, Team Kakashi is joined by Chiyo, Sasori's grandmother. The group follows the Akatsuki members' trail from Sunagakure while Konoha sends Team Guy for assistance. Deciding to stall the two groups long enough for them to extract Shukaku the One-Tail from Gaara's body, doppelgängers of Akatsuki members Itachi Uchiha and Kisame Hoshigaki are sent to distract them, and succeed in buying the needed time. The Hidden Leaf Ninja eventually converge outside the Akatsuki hideout just as the extraction of Shukaku reaches completion.
30	Puppet Masters; Chiyo-bā to Sakura (チヨバアとサクラ)	November 4, 2005; 978-4-08-873881-9	July 1, 2008; 978-1-4215-1942-5
263. "Rage...!!" (大声で怒れ...!!, "Ōgoe de ikare...!!"); 264. "Sasori's Masterpiece...!!" (サソリの芸術...!! "Sasori no geijutsu...!!"); 265. "Granny Chiyo & Sakura" (チヨバアとサクラ "Chiyo-bā to Sakura"); 266. "Sasori Revealed...!!" (サソリ、現る...!! "Sasori, arawaru...!!"); 267. "Fierce Determination...!!" (激しき決意...!! "Hageshiki ketsui...!!"); 268. "Puppet Masters!!" (傀儡師VS傀儡師!! "Kugutsushi VS kugutsushi"); 269. "What Can I Do...?!" (出来ること...!! "Dekiru koto...!!"); 270. "Miscalculation...!!" (誤算...!! "Gosan...!!"); 271. "Unknown Power...!!" (未知の能力...!! "Michi no chikara...!!")
In order for Team Kakashi to gain entry to the Akatsuki's lair, Team Guy is forced to split up in order to take down a barrier over the entrance. Though they accomplish this task, the members of Team Guy are forced to deal with a number of booby traps left for them. As for Team Kakashi, they find Sasori and Deidara along with Gaara's lifeless body. Deidara flies off with Gaara's body, leading Naruto and Kakashi away as Sakura and Chiyo deal with Sasori and his various puppets. Sakura's immense strength and Chiyo's own skills with puppetry, however, are more than capable of dealing with Sasori's puppets.
31	Final Battle; Takusareta omoi!! (託された想い!!)	December 26, 2005; 978-4-08-874002-7	September 2, 2008; 978-1-4215-1943-2
272. "Granny Chiyo vs. Sasori...!!" (チヨバアVSサソリ...!!, "Chiyo-bā VS Sasori...!!"); 273. "Final Battle...!!" (ラストバトル!! "Rasuto batoru!!"); 274. "Impossible Dream" (叶わぬ夢 "Kanawanu yume"); 275. "Reward...!!" (褒美...!! "Hōbi...!!"); 276. "New Sharingan!!" (新しい写輪眼!! "Atarashii Sharingan!!"); 277. "The Ultimate Art...!!" (究極の芸術!! "Kyūkyōku no geijūtsu!!"); 278. "The Death of Gaara" (我愛羅の死 "Gaara no shi"); 279. "Power & Miracles...!!" (不思議な力...!! "Fushigi na chikara...!!"); 280. "Trust!!" (託された想い!! "Takusareta omoi!!")
Backed into a corner, Sasori resorts to his Performance of a Hundred Puppets to overwhelm Sakura and Chiyo. However, when Sakura blocks an attack meant for her, Chiyo manages to pierce Sasori through the heart before healing Sakura's injuries. As a reward to Sakura for surviving, Sasori tells her in his dying breath of the spy he has within Orochimaru's ranks that he was supposed to meet. Elsewhere, Naruto and Kakashi succeed in retrieving Gaara's body from Deidara, who escapes them by faking his death. After they regroup with Chiyo, Sakura, and Team Guy, Sakura tries to revive Gaara, though Shukaku's extraction has resulted in his death. As Naruto mourns for Gaara, Chiyo begins transferring her life energy to Gaara's body, restoring him to life at the cost of her own. The group honors Chiyo's memory and then returns home. Later, Sasori's ring is found by Zetsu's subordinate Tobi who wants to join the Akatsuki.
32	The Search for Sasuke; Sasuke e no michi!! (サスケへの道!!)	April 4, 2006; 978-4-08-874039-3	November 4, 2008; 978-1-4215-1944-9
281. "The Search for Sasuke!!" (サスケへの道!!, "Sasuke e no michi!!"); 282. "Team Kakashi Returns" (カカシ班帰還 "Kakashi han kikan"); 283. "Team Members Wanted!!" (メンバー探し!! "Menbā sagashi!!"); 284. "The New Cell...!!" (新しい仲間...!! "Atarashii nakama...!!"); 285. "The Foundation" ("根"の者!! "'Ne' no mono!!"); 286. "Naruto, Sasuke & Sakura" (ナルトとサスケとサクラ "Naruto to Sasuke to Sakura"); 287. "Untitled" (無題 "Mudai"); 288. "Feelings...?" (分からない感情 "Wakaranai kanjō"); 289. "The Akatsuki Spy!!" ("暁"のスパイ!! "'Akatsuki' no supai!!")
Though Kakashi is left bedridden upon his return to Konoha from his battle with Deidara, he makes plans for Naruto and Sakura to meet with Sasori's spy in the hopes that they will be able to retrieve the final member of the original Team 7: Sasuke Uchiha. Danzo Shimura of Konoha's council, fearing the Akatsuki might try to capture Naruto for the Nine-Tailed Demon Fox sealed within him, assigns Sai to join Team Kakashi with Tsunade responding to it by assigning Yamato as the group's temporary leader. However, Yamato has trouble with Naruto's refusal to get along with the emotionally dead Sai. Eventually arriving to their destination, Yamato goes to meet the spy alone with the rest of Team Kakashi remain in the shadows as backup. As Yamato begins to question the spy, Kabuto Yakushi, about Orochimaru's base of operations, Orochimaru himself shows up to end their discussion.
33	The Secret Mission; Gokuhi ninmu...!! (極秘任務...!!)	June 2, 2006; 978-4-08-874108-6	December 16, 2008; 978-1-4215-2001-8
290. "Consequences!!" (裏切りの結末!!, "Uragiri no ketsumatsu!!"); 291. "Rage Trigger!!" (怒りの引き金!! "Ikari no hikigane!!"); 292. "The Third Tail...!!" (三本目...!! "Sanhonme...!!"); 293. "Rampage...!! (暴走...!!" "Bōsō...!!"); 294. "The Fourth Tail...!!" (四本目...!! "Yonhonme...!!"); 295. "Toward Nine Tails...!!" (九尾へ...!! "Kyūbi e...!!"); 296. "The Sad Conclusion" (悲しき決着 "Kanashiki ketchaku"); 297. "Sai's Mission!!" (サイの任務!! "Sai no ninmu!!"); 298. "The Secret Mission...!!" (極秘任務...!! "Gokuhi ninmu...!!"); 299. "The Source of Strength...!!" (強さの源...!! "Tsuyosa no minamoto...!!")
Kabuto, having always been loyal to Orochimaru, destroys Sasori's Hiruko body with Yamato exposed, forcing him to call in Naruto, Sakura, and Sai. Eventually, Naruto is drawn into battle with Orochimaru, eventually consumed by Nine-Tails as he is transformed into a Four-Tailed Demon Fox manifestation of the Tailed Beast. Consumed mentally, Naruto attacks Orochimaru before Yamato uses his unique abilities to suppress Nine-Tails and returns Naruto to his normal state. Naruto ends up learning of the injury he inflicted on Sakura while under the Nine Tails's influence. Meanwhile, Sai joins Orochimaru on behalf of Danzo's organization, The Foundation, and is escorted to Orochimaru's lair with Team Kakashi following him.
34	The Reunion; Saikai no toki...!! (再会の時...!!)	August 4, 2006; 978-4-08-874138-3	February 3, 2009; 978-1-4215-2002-5
300. "Sai's Picture Book!!" (サイの絵本...!!, "Sai no ehon...!!"); 301. "Sai & Sasuke!!" (サイとサスケ!! "Sai to Sasuke!!"); 302. "Infiltration...!!" (潜入...!! "Sennyū...!!"); 303. "Sai's Betrayal!!" (サイの裏切り!! "Sai no uragiri!!"); 304. "Behind the Betrayal!!" (裏切りの裏側!! "Uragiri no uragawa!!"); 305. "Our Bond" (キミとのつながり "Kimi to no tsunagari"); 306. "The Reunion...!!" (再会の時...!! "Saikai no toki...!!"); 307. "On a Whim...!!" (気まぐれ...!! "Kimagure...!!"); 308. "Sasuke's Strength!!" (サスケの力!! "Sasuke no chikara!!"); 309. "A Conversation with Nine Tails!!" (九尾との対話!! "Kyūbi to no taiwa!!")
Yamato, Naruto, and Sakura find Sai and restrain him for his treachery, though his mission is revealed to be to kill Sasuke rather than take him back alive. As they prepare to search for Sasuke, Sai questions Naruto's reasons for wanting to have Sasuke back, to which Naruto responds that the two formed a bond that he refuses to have broken. Intrigued by this concept of bonds, Sai rejoins them, even helping in capturing Kabuto. The group splits up, and Sai is the first to find Sasuke. Although Sai attempts to capture him on Naruto's behalf, Sasuke proves too strong as he overwhelms the assembled Team Kakashi. Despite this turn of events, Naruto refuses the Nine Tails's power before Sasuke enters the youth's mind and suppresses the Tailed Beast. As Sasuke prepares to kill them all, Orochimaru and Kabuto convince him to let them live so they can take out the Akatsuki for them before the three leave with the mission being a failure.
35	The New Two; Aratanaru futarigumi!! (新たなる二人組!!)	November 2, 2006; 978-4-08-874273-1	February 3, 2009; 978-1-4215-2003-2
310. "The Title" (タイトル, "Taitoru"); 311. "Nicknames" (あだ名 "Adana"); 312. "The Impending Menace!!" (忍び寄る脅威!! "Shinobiyoru kyōi!!"); 313. "The New Two!!" (新たなる二人組!! "Aratanaru futarigumi!!"); 314. "The Akatsuki Strikes...!!" ("暁"侵攻...!! "'Akatsuki' shinkō...!!"); 315. "Special Drills!!" (特別な修業!! "Tokubetsu na shugyō!!"); 316. "Let the Training Begin!!" (修行、始め!! "Shugyō, hajime!!"); 317. "Nightmares!!" (悪夢の始まり!! "Akumu no hajimari!!"); 318. "Smooth Training" (順調なる修業 "Junchō naru shugyō"); 319. "Driving Force" (つき動かすもの "Tsukiugokasumono")
Kakashi, hoping to help Naruto be a better match for Sasuke during their next meeting, begins to train him in creating a new attack. Once finding that Naruto has wind nature chakra, Kakashi helps him hone the ability to control wind. To expedite this process Kakashi has Naruto use his Shadow Clones Jutsu to train with his hundreds of copies, allowing their collective knowledge to complete a year's worth of training in a few days. Meanwhile, after defeating the Two-Tails Jinchuriki Yugito Nii, Akatsuki's Immortal Duo Hidan and Kakuzu make their towards Konoha to further their organization's goal. Tsunade, determined to either capture or eliminate the pair, mobilizes the Niju Shotai, a group of twenty squads of four ninja assigned to accomplish this very task, to find the two.
36	Cell Number 10; Daijippan (第十班)	December 27, 2006; 978-4-08-874288-5	February 3, 2009; 978-1-4215-2172-5
320. "Bounties...!!" (賞金首...!!, "Shōkin kubi...!!"); 321. "Honey-Tongued...!!" (口上手...!! "Kuchijōzu...!!"); 322. "Unkillable" (あいつは殺せない "Aitsu wa korosenai"); 323. "Judgment!!" (神の裁き!! "Kami no sabaki!!"); 324. "Shikamaru's Analysis!!" (シカマルの分析!! "Shikamaru no bunseki!!"); 325. "There Won't Be a Later...!" (後は無い...!! "Ato wa nai...!!"); 326. "The Pain You Desire...!!" (望んだ痛み...!! "Nozonda itami...!!"); 327. "Amidst Despair..." (絶望の中に... "Zetsubō no naka ni..."); 328. "Cell Number 10" (第十班 "Daijippan"); 329. "The Ultimate Goal...!!" (その目的...!! "Sono mokuteki...!!")
After Naruto gains proper control over the wind element, Kakashi tells him that creating his own unique attack will require mixing wind with his Rasengan (螺旋丸; lit. spiral sphere, English manga: "Spiral Chakra Sphere"). As Naruto struggles to accomplish this task, a Niju Shotai team consisting of Shikamaru Nara and Asuma Sarutobi finds Hidan and Kakuzu. Although they are quickly able to deliver a fatal blow to Hidan, it becomes apparent that Hidan cannot be killed by normal means, as his immortality allows him to perform a ritual that inflicts pain both on himself and the person he "curses". Hidan ultimately succeeds in fatally wounding Asuma with a stake through the heart, despite Shikamaru's attempts to prevent this. As reinforcements arrive, the Akatsuki duo is driven off, and the Niju Shotai members return home to bury Asuma.
37	Shikamaru's Battle; Shikamaru no tatakai!! (シカマルの戦い!!)	April 4, 2007; 978-4-08-874338-7	February 3, 2009; 978-1-4215-2173-2
330. "The Heartbreaking Notice...!!" (悲しき報せ...!!, "Kanashiki shirase...!!"); 331. "Cell Number 10 Sets Out...!!" (第十班が行く...!! "Daijippan ga iku...!!"); 332. "Shikamaru's Battle!!" (シカマルの戦い!! "Shikamaru no tatakai!!"); 333. "Affinities...!!" (相性...!! "Aishō...!!"); 334. "The Black Metamorphoses...!!" (黒き変貌...!! "Kuroki henbō...!!"); 335. "The Fearsome Secret!!" (恐るべき秘密!! "Osorubeki himitsu!!"); 336. "Turnabout Dilemma...!!" (一転、窮地...!! "Itten, kyūchi...!!"); 337. "Shikamaru's Genius!!" (シカマルの才!! "Shikamaru no sai!!"); 338. "Payback..." (人を呪わば... "Hito o norowaba..."); 339. "The New Jutsu...!!" (新術...!! "Shin jutsu....!!")
Shikamaru sets out with the remaining members of Team Asuma to find Hidan and avenge their teacher. To help them in their quest, Kakashi joins them as leader, leaving Yamato in charge of overseeing Naruto's training. Once they find the Akatsuki pair, Shikamaru restrains them with his shadow while Kakashi pierces Kakuzu's chest. However, Kakuzu, having multiple extra hearts, survives the attack and frees Hidan, allowing the two to team up against the Konoha ninja. Needing to separate the two, Shikamaru captures Hidan again and leads him away, where he avenges Asuma by blowing Hidan up and burying his still-speaking remains in his clan's forest where Hidan will never be found. Kakashi and the others have a considerably more difficult time with Kakuzu and his extra hearts before Naruto arrives with Yamato, Sakura, and Sai.
38	Practice Makes Perfect; Shugyō no seika...!! (修業の成果...!!)	June 4, 2007; 978-4-08-874364-6	March 3, 2009; 978-1-4215-2174-9
340. "The Perilous Bridge" (危ない橋, "Abunai hashi"); 341. "Practice Makes Perfect...!!" (修業の成果...!! "Shugyō no seika...!!"); 342. "The Black King...!!" (玉...!! "Gyoku...!!"); 343. "Merciless..." (非情に... "Hijō ni..."); 344. "The Snake..." (蛇と... "Hebi to..."); 345. "The Ritual...!!" (儀式...!! "Gishiki...!!"); 346. "The Secret of the New Jutsu!!" (新術の秘密!! "Shin jutsu no himitsu!!"); 347. "A Detour!!" (寄り道!! "Yorimichi!!"); 348. "And One Makes Three!!" (次なる一人!! "Tsugi naru hitori!!"); 349. "The Northern Hideout" (北のアジトにて "Kita no ajito nite")
Having advanced his training enough to form a usable attack, Naruto uses his Wind Style: Rasen Shuriken to inflict Kakuzu with massive damage before Kakashi lands the deathblow. Elsewhere, deciding he has learned all he can from Orochimaru, Sasuke attempts to kill his former mentor as he decides to initiate the body-stealing process. Through the use of his Sharingan (写輪眼; lit. "Copy Wheel Eye", English manga: "Mirror Wheel Eye"), Sasuke is able to turn the process around and absorbs Orochimaru into his own body. Now able to act on his whim, Sasuke decides to finally enact his plan to kill Itachi. To that end, he recruits Suigetsu Hozuki, Karin, and Jugo to aid him in his hunt.
39	On the Move; Ugokidasumono-tachi (動き出す者たち)	August 3, 2007; 978-4-08-874397-4	March 3, 2009; 978-1-4215-2175-6
350. "News of the Clash...!!" (衝撃の報せ...!!, "Shōgeki no shirase"); 351. "The Man-to-Man Talk!!" (男との対話!! "Otoko to no taiwa"); 352. "His Plan...!!" (目的は...!! "Mokuteki wa...!!"); 353. "The Akatsuki Assembles...!!" ("暁"集合...!! "'Akatsuki' shūgō...!!"); 354. "On the Move" (動き出す者たち "Ugokidasumono-tachi"); 355. "Where to...?!" (どっちへ...!? "Docchi e...!?"); 356. "Collision...!!" (衝突...!! "Shōtotsu...!!"); 357. "Deidara vs. Sasuke!!" (デイダラVSサスケ!!); 358. "Chasing C2!!" (追いつめるC2!! "Oitsumeru C2!!"); 359. "Those Eyes...!!" (その眼...!! "Sono me...!!")
With Jugo joining his group Hebi, Sasuke and his comrades and split up to search for clues about Itachi's whereabouts. Once word of Orochimaru's defeat by Sasuke reaches Konoha, Naruto decides that this would be a good opportunity to try to retrieve Sasuke again. Realizing that Sasuke is looking for Itachi, Naruto sets out with Sakura, Sai, Kakashi, Yamato, and the members of Team 8 to find either of the Uchiha brothers. Akatsuki also learns of Orochimaru's defeat, and they mobilize Deidara and his new teammate Tobi to deal with Sasuke. The two soon find Sasuke, and Deidara meets him in battle, though Sasuke's abilities soon prove to be more than a match for Deidara's bombs.
40	The Ultimate Art; Kyūkyoku geijutsu!! (究極芸術!!)	November 2, 2007; 978-4-08-874432-2	March 3, 2009; 978-1-4215-2841-0
360. "The C4 Karura" (C4カルラ, "C4 Karura"); 361. "Achilles' Heel...!!" (弱点...!! "Jakuten...!!"); 362. "The Ultimate Art!!" (究極芸術!! "Kyūkyoku geijutsu!!"); 363. "Sasuke's Death...!!" (サスケの死...!! "Sasuke no shi...!!"); 364. "The Target...!!" (狙いは...!! "Nerai wa...!!"); 365. "Pursue Itachi!" (イタチを追え "Itachi o oe"); 366. "Brothers" (兄弟 "Kyōdai"); 367. "Itachi and Sasuke" (イタチとサスケ "Itachi to Sasuke"); 368. "Intel" (情報収集 "Jōhōshūshū"); 369. "Regarding Pain" (ペインについて "Pein ni tsuite")
Sasuke survives Deidara's strongest attacks, forcing the Akatsuki member to turn himself in a suicide bomber to take out his opponent. However, Sasuke escapes the blast by sacrificing the snake Manda, though he is forced to regroup with the other members of Hebi to rest. After he recuperates, they head to a nearby Akatsuki lair where Sasuke is able to meet with Itachi. Once Sasuke exhibits his increased skills, Itachi consents to meeting with him at an Uchiha site for their last battle. Meanwhile, having survived Deidara's blast and claiming himself to be the true leader of the Akatsuki while calling himself Madara Uchiha, Tobi assigns the Akatsuki's figurehead leader, Pain, the task of capturing Naruto. Before Pain can set out on this mission, however, Jiraiya infiltrates Amegakure, and Pain is forced to deal with him before he can go after Naruto.
41	Jiraiya's Decision; Jiraiya no sentaku!! (自来也の選択!!)	February 4, 2008; 978-4-08-874472-8	March 3, 2009; 978-1-4215-2842-7
370. "Unease" (胸騒ぎ, "Munasawagi"); 371. "Old Acquaintances!!" (旧知...!! "Kyūchi...!!"); 372. "The Weeping Land!!" (泣いている国!! "Naiteiru kuni!!"); 373. "Back in the Day...!!" (師弟時代...!! "Shitei jidai...!!"); 374. "Advancement!!" (神への成長!! "Kami e no seichō!!"); 375. "Two Great Sages...!!" (二大仙人...!! "Ni Daisennin...!!"); 376. "Child of Prophecy!!" (予言の子!! "Yogen no ko!!"); 377. "Honored Sage Mode!!" (仙人モード!! "Sennin mōdo!!"); 378. "One to One...!!" (一対一...!! "Ittai'ichi!!"); 379. "Jiraiya's Decision!!" (自来也の選択!! "Jiraiya no sentaku!!")
After gathering some intelligence on Pain, Jiraiya goes to confront him. Before he can do so, however, he is found by Pain's partner, Konan, his former student. During a brief battle, Jiraiya begins to suspect that Pain is also a former student, Nagato, a belief that is confirmed upon the Akatsuki leader's arrival. Konan falls back while Pain battles with Jiraiya, and the two exchange blows with their summons. Once Jiraiya's toads begin to gain the upper hand, Pain summons two additional Pains to fight alongside him. Though caught off guard by this turn of events and left outnumbered, Jiraiya is able to finish off the three bodies. Believing the battle to be won, Jiraiya continues on his way, only to be badly injured by the appearance of three more Pains in addition to the three he just killed.
42	The Secret of the Mangekyo; Mangekyō no himitsu...!! (万華鏡の秘密...!!)	May 2, 2008; 978-4-08-874512-1	April 7, 2009; 978-1-4215-2843-4
380. "Faces...!!" (その面影...!!, "Sono omokage...!!"); 381. "True Identities...!!" (その正体...!! "Sono shōtai...!!"); 382. "The True Choice!!" (本当の選択!! "Hontō no sentaku!!"); 383. "The Final Chapter, and...!!" (最終章、そして...!! "Saishūshō, soshite...!!"); 384. "Two Paths..." (二つの道... "Futatsu no michi..."); 385. "The Secret of the Mangekyo...!!" (万華鏡の秘密...!! "Mangekyō no himitsu...!!"); 386. "New Light...!!" (新たな光...!! "Aratana hikari...!!"); 387. "Reality...!!" (現実...!! "Genjitsu...!!"); 388. "Variance of Strength...!!" (力の差...!! "Chikara no sa...!!"); 389. "Sasuke's Flow!!" (サスケの流れ! "Sasuke no nagare!")
Though able to capture one of Pain's six bodies, Jiraiya is unable to defeat the other five. Knowing this will be the only chance to learn the truth behind Pain, he sends the captured body to Tsunade and goes to investigate the Akatsuki leader's secret. Jiraiya succeeds and sends his discovery to Naruto and the rest of Konoha, yet dies from his injuries. Elsewhere, Sasuke meets with Itachi, leaving Hebi behind to deal with Itachi's partner Kisame. As Naruto and his group near their location, Tobi steps in to stall them so that the two brothers can fight uninhibited. The battle between Sasuke and Itachi commences, and Sasuke is able to use his years of hatred to push Itachi to his limits.
43	The Man with the Truth; Shinjitsu o shiru mono (真実を知る者)	August 4, 2008; 978-4-08-874552-7	April 7, 2009; 978-1-4215-2929-5
390. "The Final Jutsu...!!" (最後の術...!!, "Saigo no jutsu...!!"); 391. "Thunderclap...!!" (雷鳴と共に...!! "Raimei to tomo ni...!!"); 392. "Susano'o...!!" (須佐能乎...!! "Susano'o...!!"); 393. "My Eyes...!!" (オレの眼...!! "Ore no me...!!"); 394. "Sasuke's Victory" (サスケの勝利 "Sasuke no shōri"); 395. "The Mystery of Tobi" (トビの謎 "Tobi no nazo"); 396. "Self-Intro" (自己紹介 "Jikoshōkai"); 397. "The Man with the Truth" (真実を知る者 "Shinjitsu o shiru mono"); 398. "The Origin of Konoha" (木ノ葉のはじまり "Konoha no hajimari"); 399. "How It All Begins!!" (すべての始まり!! "Subete no hajimari!!"); 400. "Living a Nightmare" (地獄の中で "Jigoku no naka de"); 401. "Illusions" (幻術 "Maboroshi"); 402. "Final Words" (最後の言葉 "Saigo no kotoba")
To bring the battle to a swift end, Sasuke conjures up a bolt of lightning Kirin to strike Itachi down. Itachi survives the attack, but after removing Orochimaru from Sasuke's body, he dies. Tobi collects Sasuke to tend to his injuries, and Naruto, having lost Sasuke's trail, is forced to return home. Once Sasuke regains consciousness, Tobi tells him of the Uchiha's history: that after he, Madara Uchiha, helped to found Konoha alongside the future First Hokage Hashirama Senju, a mistrust between Konoha's leadership and the Uchiha was created over the generations with the Nine-Tails worsening it. When years later the Uchiha began planning to overthrow this leadership, Itachi was ordered by Konoha to eliminate his own clan to prevent the Uchiha clan's rebellion. While Itachi did as instructed, he chose to spare Sasuke and lived as a criminal while lying to Sasuke so that Sasuke could someday kill him to avenge their family and become a Leaf Hero. At some point, Itachi contracted an incurable disease that shortened his lifespan considerably, yet he forced himself to stay alive so he could die by Sasuke's hands. Realizing that Itachi was as much of a victim as he was, Sasuke heads out to destroy Konoha.
44	Senjutsu Heir; Senjutsu Denshō...!! (仙術伝承...!!)	November 4, 2008; 978-4-08-874589-3	April 7, 2009; 978-1-4215-3134-2
403. "Tears" (涙, "Namida"); 404. "Taka & Akatsuki" ("鷹"と"暁" "'Taka' to 'Akatsuki'"); 405. "Inheritance" (遺されたもの "Nokosaretamono"); 406. "The Key to the Future" (未来への鍵 "Mirai e no kagi"); 407. "Addressee: Naruto" (ナルトに宛てて "Naruto ni atete"); 408. "Fukasaku's Proposition" (フカサクの提案 "Fukasaku no teian"); 409. "Senjutsu Heir...!!" (仙術伝承! "Senjutsu Denshō!"); 410. "The Battle at Storm Cloud Ravine!!" (雲雷峡の闘い!! "Unraikyō no tatakai!!"); 411. "Eight Tails vs. Sasuke!!" (八尾VSサスケ!! "Hachibi VS Sasuke!!"); 412. "Quivers of Anticipation" (かつてない戦慄 "Katsutenai senritsu")
Upon his return to Konoha, Naruto learns of Jiraiya's death by Pain. Knowing that Akatsuki will be coming for him and wanting to avenge his master, Naruto decides to learn how to use senjutsu (仙術; lit. "sage techniques") to prepare himself for the inevitable encounter with Pain. He goes to the home of the toads to train, just as Jiraiya had years earlier, and leaves deciphering Pain's identity to his friends in Konoha. Elsewhere, Sasuke agrees to have Hebi, now renamed Taka, work with Akatsuki in return for their help in destroying Konoha. Taka is sent to capture the eight-tailed beast, and upon finding its host, Killer Bee, they engage him in battle. Even though Killer Bee proves more than a match for the four of them, he nevertheless decides to release the beast within him.
45	Battlefield, Konoha; Senjō, Konoha!! (戦場、木ノ葉!!)	February 4, 2009; 978-4-08-874627-2	July 7, 2009; 978-1-4215-3135-9
413. "Crumbling" (崩落, "Hōraku"); 414. "Raging Bull" (暴れ牛 "Abare ushi"); 415. "New Powers!!" (新しき力!! "Atarashiki chikara!!"); 416. "Tales of a Gutsy Shinobi" (ド根性忍伝 "Dokonjō ninden"); 417. "Raikage on the Move!!" (雷影、動く!! "Raikage, ugoku!!"); 418. "Sage Naruto!!" (仙人ナルト!! "Sennin Naruto!!"); 419. "Raid!!" (襲来!! "Shūrai!!"); 420. "Battlefield, Konoha!!" (戦場、木ノ葉!! "Senjō, Konoha!!"); 421. "Recall Naruto!!" (ナルトを呼び戻せ!! "Naruto o yobimodose!!"); 422. "Kakashi vs. Pain!!" (カカシVSペイン!! "Kakashi VS Pein!!")
With the full power of the eight-tailed beast, Killer Bee is able to decimate Taka. Fearing the deaths of his teammates, Sasuke unleashes his newly acquired Mangekyō Sharingan (万華鏡写輪眼, Mangekyō Sharingan; lit. "Kaleidoscope Copy Wheel Eye") to suppress the beast's influence and capture Killer Bee. When the Raikage Ay, the leader of Kumogakure and Killer Bee's brother, learns of this, he decides to convene the five Kage to discuss how to deal with the growing threat of Akatsuki. As word of the meeting is sent out, Akatsuki attempts to extract the eight-tailed beast from Killer Bee's body, only to discover that the body is a fake and that Killer Bee still roams free. Elsewhere, Naruto masters senjutsu and begins to apply its teachings to some of his old techniques. While he does so, Pain's six bodies arrive in Konoha and attack the village in search of him. Taken by surprise, Konoha mobilizes its forces, Kakashi even engaging two of Pain's bodies at once.
46	Naruto Returns; Naruto kikan!! (ナルト帰還!!)	May 1, 2009; 978-4-08-874663-0	October 6, 2009; 978-1-4215-3304-9
423. "Tendo's Ability!!" (天道の能力!!, "Tendō no nōryoku!!"); 424. "Determination!!" (決断!! "Ketsudan!!"); 425. "Hatake Kakashi" (はたけカカシ); 426. "Naruto & Konoha!!" (ナルトと木ノ葉!! "Naruto to Konoha!!"); 427. "Reunion" (再会 "Saikai"); 428. "Discourse" (対談!! "Taidan!!"); 429. "Know Pain" (傷みを "Itami o"); 430. "Naruto Returns!!" (ナルト帰還!! "Naruto kikan!!"); 431. "Naruto's Magnificent Explosion!!" (ナルト大噴火!! "Naruto daifunka!!"); 432. "Return of the Rasen-Shuriken!!" (螺旋手裏剣再び!! "Rasenshuriken futatabi!!")
Although he is able to defeat one of Pain's bodies, Kakashi is unable to land a blow on another and is left on the brink of death. After one final valiant effort to ensure that the intel gathered on Pain is not wasted, he dies and reunites with his father in the afterlife. Across the village, Konoha's other ninja have similar difficulties with the remaining bodies, all the while struggling to find out as much as they can about Pain and protect Naruto's location. Pain eventually discovers Naruto's whereabouts and destroys Konoha to teach the villagers the pain of fighting. Naruto returns from his training immediately following Pain's attack, and takes it upon himself to avenge the damage done to the village and its inhabitants. Using his new senjutsu abilities, Naruto handily reduces the Pain's body number to two.
47	The Seal Destroyed; Fūin hakai!! (封印破壊!!)	August 4, 2009; 978-4-08-874711-8	February 2, 2010; 978-1-4215-3305-6
433. "Sage Jutsu, a Mistake...?!" (仙術失敗...!?, "Senjutsu shippai...!?"); 434. "Naruto vs. Tendo!!" (ナルトVS天道!! "Naruto VS Tendō!!"); 435. "Banshoten'in! Universal Pull!!" (万象天引 "Banshō Ten'in"); 436. "Peace" (平和 "Heiwa"); 437. "Confessions" (告白 "Kokuhaku"); 438. "The Seal Destroyed!!" (封印破壊!! "Fūin hakai!!"); 439. "Catastrophic Planetary Construction" (地爆天星 "Chibaku Tensei"); 440. "The Conversation with Lord Fourth!!" (四代目との会話!! "Yondaime to no kaiwa!!"); 441. "Rasen-Shuriken vs. Almighty Push!!" (螺旋手裏剣VS神羅天征!! "Rasenshuriken VS Shinra Tensei!!"); 442. "The Final Gamble!!" (最後の賭け!! "Saigo no kake!!")
Naruto is able to finish off one of Pain's two remaining bodies, but is defeated and pinned down by the last one. Pain explains his motivations and asks what Naruto would do to bring about peace, but Naruto is unable to answer. Hinata intervenes to defend Naruto, declaring her love for him, and is nearly killed. In his anger over all that has happened, Naruto almost releases the Demon Fox from his body, but is stopped by the spirit of the Fourth Hokage Minato Namikaze, who reveals that he is Naruto's real father. Minato brings Naruto back to his senses and, during a brief conversation, voices his suspicions that Pain and Akatsuki are being manipulated by Tobi. Before disappearing, Minato suppresses the fox's influence and entrusts Naruto to find a way to bring about peace. Revitalized, Naruto faces off with Pain's last body, eventually defeating it.
48	The Cheering Village; Kanko no sato!! (歓呼の里!!)	November 4, 2009; 978-4-08-874748-4	June 1, 2010; 978-1-4215-3474-9
443. "The Interview!!" (対面!!, "Taimen!!"); 444. "The Response" (答 "Kotae"); 445. "Top of the World" (世界の天辺 "Sekai no teppen"); 446. "I Just Want to Protect Them" (ただ二人を守もりたい "Tada futari o mamoritai"); 447. "I Believe" (信じる "Shinjiru"); 448. "Heirloom...!!" (形見...!! "Katami...!!"); 449. "The Blossom of Hope" (希望の花 "Kibō no hana"); 450. "The Cheering Village!!" (歓呼の里!! "Kanko no sato!!"); 451. "Sasuke's Disposal!!" (サスケの処分!! "Sasuke no shobun!!"); 452. "Pressured by Danzo!!" (ダンゾウに迫る!! "Danzō ni semaru!!"); 453. "Gokage Summit's Eve" (五影会談前夜...!! "Gokage kaidan zen'ya...!!")
Using the knowledge gathered from Jiraiya and other Konoha ninja, Naruto locates Nagato, the emaciated man who controls all of Pain's bodies. Before deciding what to do with him, Naruto asks how Nagato, a fellow pupil of Jiraiya, could have gone so astray. Nagato explains how the various tragedies he experienced in his life led him to desire peace through war. Naruto rejects his conclusion for differing from Jiraiya's ideals and resolves to find peace some other way, a dream both Nagato and Jiraiya once shared. To that end, he spares Nagato, as his death would only produce another war. Amazed, Nagato decides to put faith in Naruto's method and sacrifices his life to revive everyone that died in Konoha's defense. In the aftermath, Naruto is finally hailed as a Leaf Hero, the village starts to rebuild, and Tsunade, having expended all of her energy to protect the villagers from Pain, falls into a coma. Danzo Shimura, Sai's superior, replaces her as Fifth Hokage candidate and as his first act orders Sasuke be executed as a traitor to the village.
