= Naruto: Rise of a Ninja =

2007 video game

- European cover art
- Developer: Ubisoft Montreal
- Publisher: Ubisoft
- Producer: Sébastien Puel
- Designer: Olivier Palmieri
- Programmer: Dany Joannette
- Composers: Inon Zur; Musashi Project; Toshiro Masuda; Masaaki Iizuka
- Engine: Jade
- Platform: Xbox 360
- Release: NA: October 30, 2007; AU: November 1, 2007; EU: November 2, 2007
- Genres: Fighting, role-playing
- Modes: Single-player, multiplayer

Naruto: Rise of a Ninja is an action adventure game for the Xbox 360 with high emphasis on fighting and platforming mechanics, like with most Naruto games, it features cel-shaded graphics. The game was developed by Ubisoft Montreal, making it the first Naruto game to be developed by a non-Japanese company. The game is specifically based on the English dubbed version of the anime. The game was released in 2007. A sequel titled Naruto: The Broken Bond was released in the following year.

== Gameplay ==
Naruto: Rise of a Ninja consists of two major gameplay modes: The first is a 3D action-adventure mode that takes place from the beginning of the series to the end of the Invasion of Konoha arc (episodes 1-80 of the anime) where you explore the environment, and do predominantly platforming and racing based tasks to earn money for upgrades and progress the story. It features gameplay similar to that of a 3D platformer, like jumping acrobatically from rooftop to rooftop or racing through checkpoints. In this mode when combat is initiated the game swaps to a more traditional 2D fighting game set-up of combos and special moves, many of which are acquired as the game progresses.

The second is based solely around the combat portion of the game and is essentially a one-on-one fighting mode that allows for online versus multiplayer via Xbox Live titled "The Forest of Death". By defeating other opponents, players rank up and eventually gain points to complete the exam. If the player is defeated, they must begin from the bottom of the table all over again, but the points are still kept. Offline play and two-player versus mode are also available.

The game supports downloadable content; five new characters have been made available (Shikamaru, Choji, Jiraiya, the 3rd Hokage, and Temari). Downloadable content also adds two new arenas to play in and additional achievements for each character played in the Forest of Death.

=== Characters ===
- Naruto Uzumaki
- Sasuke Uchiha
- Sakura Haruno
- Kakashi Hatake
- Gaara of the Sand
- Haku
- Zabuza Momochi
- Orochimaru
- Kiba Inuzuka
- Rock Lee
- Neji Hyuga

Downloadable characters

- Choji Akimichi
- Temari
- Shikamaru Nara
- The Third Hokage
- Jiraiya

Choji, Temari, the Third Hokage and Jiraiya came bundled in packs of two: Choji and Temari, Third Hokage and Jiraiya. Each bundle also came with two new maps/arenas. Shikamaru is free, but players must be registered to Ubisoft and link their Xbox Live to their Ubisoft account. The DLC is no longer available on the Xbox Marketplace.

== Development ==
Rise of a Ninja was released in 2007. Ubisoft has also released a free 60MB download, which includes a Japanese voice option, the ability to change the in-game voices to Japanese, while still keeping the English subtitles.

== Reception ==
Reception

Aggregate score
Aggregator	Score
Metacritic	78/100

Review scores
Publication	Score
Destructoid	8/10
Electronic Gaming Monthly	6.67/10
Eurogamer	7/10
Game Informer	8/10
GamePro	4/5
GameSpot	7.5/10
GameSpy	4.5/5
GameTrailers	8.4/10
GameZone	8.5/10
IGN	(US) 8.4/10 (AU) 8.2/10
Official Xbox Magazine (US)	8/10

The game received "favorable" reviews according to video game review aggregator Metacritic.

Naruto: Rise of a Ninja was nominated for Best Game Based on a Movie Or TV Show at 2007 Spike Video Game Awards, but lost to The Simpsons Game.
