= Tom Gibis =

American actor (born 1964)

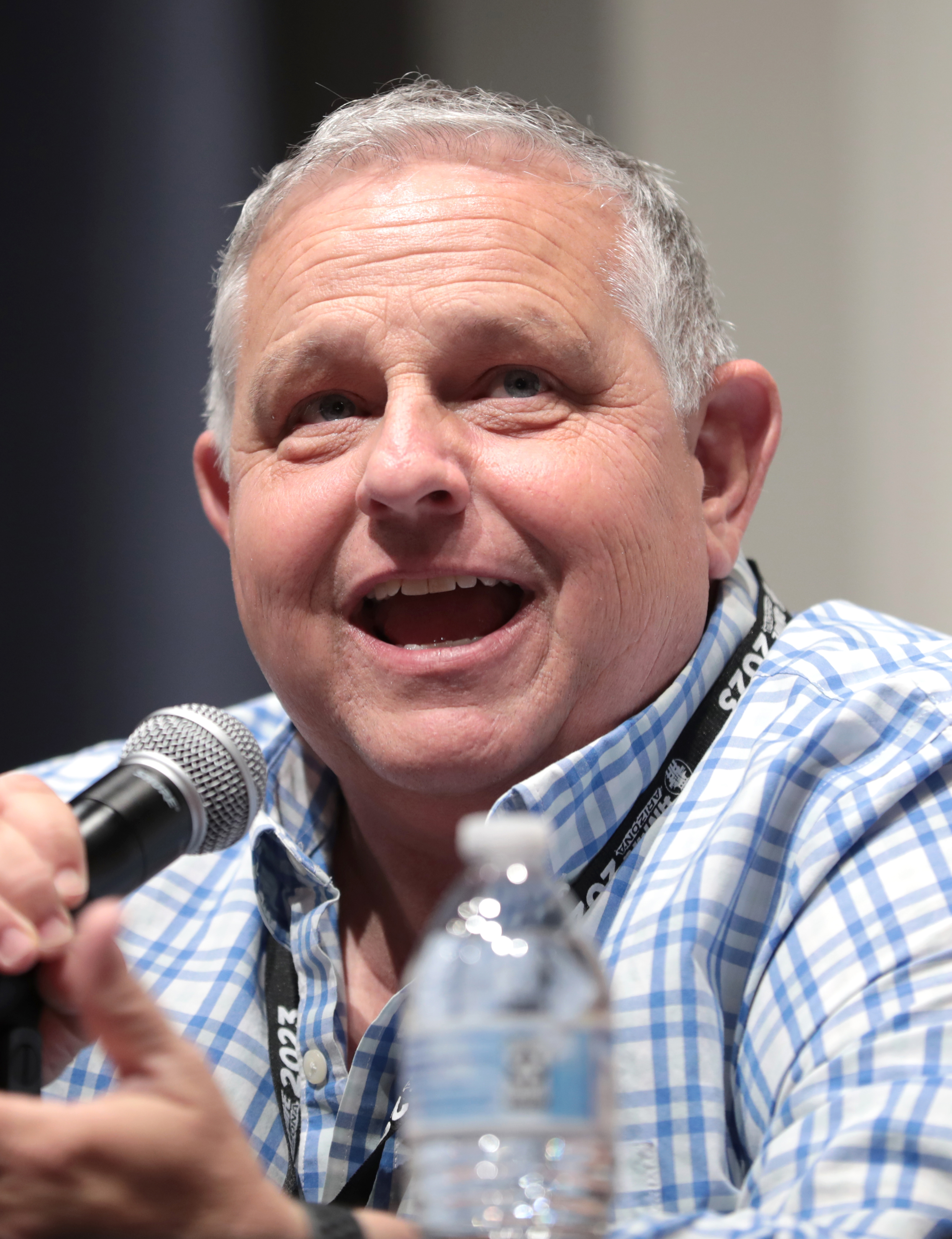
- Tom Gibis in 2023
- Born: Thomas Wayne Gibis; August 22, 1964 (age 61); West St. Paul, Minnesota, U.S.
- Occupations: Actor, voice actor
- Spouse: Jeanmarie Bascom (m. 2013)

Thomas Wayne Gibis (born August 22, 1964) is an American actor and voice actor. Gibis is best known as the voice of Shikamaru Nara from Naruto, Takumi Nomiya from Honey and Clover, and Mushra from Shinzo.

== Early life ==
Gibis was born in West St. Paul, Minnesota.

== Filmography ==
=== Television ===
Year	Title	Role	Notes
1994	Marmalade Boy	Tsutomu Rokutanda	Voice, English dub
2000–2001	Digimon Adventure 02	Michael	Voice, English dub
2000	Shinzo	Mushra	Voice, English dub
2002–2025+	Naruto	Shikamaru Nara	Voice, English dub
2002	Grounded for Life	Chuck	2 episodes
2003	A.U.S.A.	Corbie	2 episodes
2004	The Prince of Tennis	Yuta Fuji	Voice, English dub
2005	Honey and Clover	Takumi Nomiya	Voice, English dub
2006	Buso Renkin	Jinnai, Jirou Choun	Voice, English dub
2016	Kabaneri of the Iron Fortress	Sukari	Voice, English dub
2017–Ongoing	Boruto: Naruto Next Generations	Shikamaru Nara	Voice, English dub

=== Film ===
Year	Title	Role	Notes
1996	Beautiful Girls	Peter the Eater	
2002	The Lobo Paramilitary Christmas Special	Easter Bunny	
2005	Naruto the Movie: Legend of the Stone of Gelel	Shikamaru Nara	Voice
2009	Naruto Shippuden the Movie: The Will of Fire	Shikamaru Nara	Voice
2014	JLA Adventures: Trapped in Time	Toyman, Jonathan Kent	Voice, direct-to-video
2014	The Last: Naruto the Movie	Shikamaru Nara	Voice

=== Video games ===
Year	Title	Role	Notes
2007	Naruto: Path of the Ninja	Shikamaru Nara	
2007	Naruto: Uzumaki Chronicles	Shikamaru Nara	
2007	Naruto: Rise of a Ninja	Shikamaru Nara	
2008	Naruto: Ninja Destiny	Shikamaru Nara	
2008	Naruto: Ultimate Ninja Storm	Shikamaru Nara	
2008	Naruto: The Broken Bond	Shikamaru Nara	
2010	Naruto Shippuden: Ultimate Ninja Storm 2	Shikamaru Nara	
2011	Naruto Shippuden: Ultimate Ninja Impact	Shikamaru Nara	
2012	Naruto Shippuden: Ultimate Ninja Storm Generations	Shikamaru Nara	
2013	Naruto Shippuden: Ultimate Ninja Storm 3	Shikamaru Nara	
2014	Naruto Shippuden: Ultimate Ninja Storm Revolution	Shikamaru Nara	
2016	Naruto Shippuden: Ultimate Ninja Storm 4	Shikamaru Nara	
2018	Naruto to Boruto: Shinobi Striker	Shikamaru Nara	
