= List of Naruto chapters (Part I) =

The twenty-seven volume set that constitutes the first part of the Naruto manga. It was released on August 26, 2008, by Viz Media.

The Naruto manga is written by Masashi Kishimoto and is published by Shueisha in the Weekly Shōnen Jump magazine, in twenty-page installments. Part I follows the title character named Naruto Uzumaki, an energetic and determined pre-teen ninja with superhuman ninjutsu abilities, who is the host of the Nine-Tailed Fox that was sealed inside of him 12 years ago before the series began, seeks recognition from his peers, and dreams to become the Hokage, the strongest ninja leader of the Hidden Leaf Village in order to gain respect from the villagers. The first chapter of Naruto was published in issue 43 from 1999. continuing to more than seven hundred chapters in all. The Naruto manga is serialized in North America by Viz Media in their manga anthology magazine Shonen Jump, with the first chapter of the English adaptation published in the January 2003 issue. The Naruto manga is split in two parts to divide the storyline; the first part, Part I, covers the first two hundred thirty-eight chapters of the series. Part II of the Naruto storyline begins at the two hundred forty-fifth chapter, and takes place two and a half years after the end of Part I which focuses on teenage Naruto's return. The six chapters between Part I and Part II form a gaiden taking place before the regular storyline, called the "Kakashi Chronicles" (カカシ外伝, "Kakashi gaiden"). An anime adaptation of the series, produced by Studio Pierrot and TV Tokyo, was aired on TV Tokyo, with the first episode shown on October 3, 2002. The last episode of the Naruto anime aired on February 8, 2007, with the anime adaptation of Part II, known as Naruto: Shippūden, to replace it.

The chapters that make Part I have been composed into twenty-seven tankōbon in Japan by Shueisha. The first tankōbon was published on March 3, 2000, and the twenty-seventh on April 4, 2005. Most of the tankōbon contains nine chapters from the original manga. Viz Media has also published all twenty-seven volumes of the English adaptation of Part I in North America. In addition, Viz Media has published the twenty-seven volumes within a boxed set, thus constituting the entirety of the Naruto storyline before Part II, on August 26, 2008. A "Collector's Edition" of volume 1, adding a hardcover, was also published on September 16, 2008, by Viz.

The "Naruto Nation" campaign, a plan to release three volumes each month in the last four months of 2007, was announced by Viz Media shortly before the release of the fourteenth volume. Cammie Allen, Viz Media's product manager, commented, "Our main reason [for the accelerated schedule] was to catch up to the Japanese release schedule to give our readers a similar experience to that of our readers in Japan." The English serialization of Part II premiered on December 4, 2007, in Shonen Jump.

== Volume list ==
| No. | Title | Original release date | English release date |
|---|---|---|---|
| 1 | The Tests of the Ninja; Ninja no shiren (忍者の試練) | March 3, 2000; 978-4-08-872840-7 | August 6, 2003; 978-1-56931-900-0 |
1. "Uzumaki Naruto!" (うずまきナルト!); 2. "Konohamaru" (木ノ葉丸); 3. "Enter Sasuke!" (サスケ参戦! "Sasuke sansen!"); 4. "Hatake Kakashi!" (はたけカカシ!); 5. "Pride Goeth Before a Fall" (堕落する前にプライドが失われる "Daraku suru mae ni puraido ga ushinawa reru"); 6. "Not Sasuke!" (サスケじゃないよ! "Sasuke janai yo!"); 7. "Kakashi's Decision" (カカシの決断 "Kakashi no ketsudan")
For the first twelve years of his lonely life, a young ninja named Naruto Uzumaki, who had to live a life without parents and endure the apparent unsolicited hate from the villagers of Konohagakure, never knowing what it was like to be loved or have friends as a result. One day, however, he learns from the covert ninja named Mizuki that the Nine-Tailed Demon Fox was sealed within him soon after his birth and is the reason he is alone in the world. After this, Naruto's fortunes begin to change. In addition to finding a father figure in Iruka Umino, Naruto defeats Mizuki in combat by using his Multi Shadow Clones Jutsu, which is the ability to create multiple clones of Naruto himself after learning from the Scroll of Sealings, Naruto achieves his dream by finally becoming a ninja, his ultimate desire being, is to become the greatest respected in Konoha, the Hokage. In doing so, Naruto is added to Team 7 along with his long-time rival Sasuke Uchiha and his crush Sakura Haruno under the leadership of Kakashi Hatake. To see whether or not the three are ready to become ninja, Kakashi administers a test to see if they have what it takes. Each fails independently, leading Kakashi to believe they will never become a ninja.
| 2 | The Worst Client; Saiaku no irainin (最悪の依頼人) | June 2, 2000; 978-4-08-872878-0 | December 17, 2003; 978-1-59116-178-3 |
8. "You Failed!" (だから不合格だってんだ!!, "Dakara fugōkaku datten'da!"); 9. "The Worst Client" (最悪の依頼人 "Saiaku no irainin"); 10. "Target #2" (2匹目 "Nihikime"); 11. "Going Ashore (上陸...!! "Jōriku"); 12. "Game Over!!!" (終わりだ!! "Owari da!!"); 13. "Ninja!!" (忍者だ!! "Ninja da!!"); 14. "The Secret Plan...!!!" (秘策...!! "Hisaku...!!"); 15. "Return of the Sharingan" (蘇る写輪眼!! "Yomigaeru Sharingan"); 16. "Who Are You?!" (お前は誰だ!! "Omae wa dare da!!"); 17. "Preparations for Battle" (戦いの準備!! "Tatakai no junbi")
Kakashi advises the three to start focusing on the team's well-being instead of their own, and in doing so they are able to pass the test. As one of the team's first missions, they are assigned to escort a man named Tazuna to the Land of Waves. Along the way, the group is attacked by Zabuza Momochi, an assassin sent to kill Tazuna. Kakashi, with the help of Naruto, Sasuke, and his own Sharingan (写輪眼; lit. "Copy Wheel Eye", English manga: "Mirror Wheel Eye") eye, is able to defeat Zabuza. Before he can finish Zabuza off, however, a masked boy named Haku arrives to take him away. In preparation for another of Zabuza's attacks, Kakashi decides to train Naruto, Sasuke, and Sakura.
| 3 | Bridge of Courage; Yume no tame ni...!! (夢の為に...!!) | August 4, 2000; 978-4088728988 | April 14, 2004; 978-1-59116-187-5 |
18. "Training Day" (修業開始, "Shūgyō kaishi"); 19. "The Emblem of Courage" (勇気の象徴 "Yūki no shōchō"); 20. "The Land That Had a Hero...!!" (英雄のいた国...!! "Eiyū no ita kuni...!!"); 21. "A Meeting in the Forest...!!" (森の中の出会い...!! "Mori no naka no deai...!!"); 22. "The Enemies Return" (強敵出現 "Kyōteki shutsugen"); 23. "Ambush Times Two!" (2つの急襲! "Futatsu no kyūshū!"); 24. "Speed!!" (スピード!!" "Supīdo!!"); 25. "For Your Dreams...!!" (夢の為に...!! "Yume no tame ni...!!"); 26. "Sharingan Devastation!!" (写輪眼崩し!! "Sharingan kuzushi!!"); 27. "Awakenings" (覚醒 "Mezame")
In an effort to get stronger, Naruto trains harder than Sasuke and Sakura. Though he catches up to both in terms of talent, exerting the extra effort leaves him fatigued. To allow him a chance to regain his energy, the rest of Team 7 goes on to escort Tazuna without him. Soon afterwards, however, they are attacked again by Zabuza and a masked Haku. Using his new training, Sasuke does battle with Haku and proves to be an equal match, forcing Haku to trap him in a prison of ice. Naruto quickly arrives to help and joins Sasuke in the fight, though both are soon overpowered. As Haku makes to finish Naruto off, Sasuke uses himself as a shield to block the attack and appears to be killed. Naruto, in his anger, taps into the dormant powers of the demon fox sealed within him.
| 4 | The Next Level; Eiyū no hashi!! (英雄の橋!!) | October 4, 2000; 978-4088730264 | August 3, 2004; 978-1-59116-358-9 |
28. "Nine Tails...!! (九尾...!!", "Kyūbi...!!"); 29. "Someone Precious to You" (大切な人 "Taisetsu-na hito"); 30. "Your Future Is...!!" (お前の未来は...!! "Omae no mirai wa...!!"); 31. "To Each His Own Struggle..." (それぞれの戦い... "Sorezore no tatakai..."); 32. "The Tools Called Shinobi" (忍という名の道具 "Shinobi to iu na no dōgu"); 33. "The Bridge of the Hero!!" (英雄の橋!! "Eiyū no hashi!!"); 34. "Intruders?" (侵入者? "Shinnyūsha?"); 35. "Iruka vs. Kakashi" (イルカVSカカシ); 36. "Sakura's Depression" (サクラの憂鬱 "Sakura no Yūutsu")
With the demon fox's power, Naruto is easily able to kill Haku and avenge Sasuke's death. However, when Haku's mask breaks away, Naruto is unable to bring himself to kill the young boy beneath the mask and suppress demon fox's power. Elsewhere, Kakashi and Zabuza do battle. As Kakashi is about to kill Zabuza with his Lightning Blade, Haku takes the attack, saving Zabuza at the cost of his own life. Despite this turn of events Kakashi is still able to disable Zabuza, prompting the arrival of Zabuza's employer, Gato. When Gato orders his own personal army of thugs to kill Zabuza along with Tazuna and Team 7, Zabuza uses the last of his strength to kill Gato, avenging Haku's death before dying himself. With their C-rank mission complete, Team 7 and a revived Sasuke return to Konoha. Soon after returning home, Naruto, Sasuke, and Sakura are entered into the Chunin Exams, a chance for them to rise up the ninja ranks and test their abilities.
| 5 | The Challengers; Chōsensha-tachi!! (挑戦者たち!!) | December 4, 2000; 978-4088730509 | December 7, 2004; 978-1-59116-359-6 |
37. "A Total Mismatch!!!" (最悪の相性!!, "Saiaku no aishō!!"); 38. "On Your Mark" ("START...!!"); 39. "The Challengers!!" (挑戦者たち!! "Chōsensha-tachi!!"); 40. "The First Test" (第一の試験 "Daiichi no shiken"); 41. "The Whisper of Demons" (悪魔の囁き "Akuma no sasayaki"); 42. "To Each His Own" (それぞれの闘い "Sorezore no tatakai"); 43. "The Tenth Question" (第10問目 "Daijū monme"); 44. "The Talents We Test For" (試された資質 "Tamesareta shishitsu"); 45. "The Second Exam" (第二の試験 "Daini no shiken")
Prior to the start of the exam, Team 7 has a chance to mingle with their former classmates and fellow rookie ninja: the members of Team 8 and Team 10. Once the first phase of the exam begins, it is revealed that all of those wishing to advance in rank must first complete a written test. The test's questions, however, prove too difficult for almost all present, and it soon becomes apparent that the true objective of the first phase is to cheat without getting caught. Unaware that this is the test's true purpose, Naruto insists on continuing. Through his willingness to face the unknown, he is allowed to continue on to the second phase with the rest of the examinees who were not caught.
| 6 | Predator; Sakura no ketsui!! (サクラの決意!!) | March 2, 2001; 978-4088730899 | April 5, 2005; 978-1-59116-739-6 |
46. "The Password Is..." (合言葉は..., "Aikotoba wa..."); 47. "Predator!!" (捕食者!! "Hoshokusha!!"); 48. "The Target Is...!!" (その目的は...!! "Sono mokuteki wa...!!"); 49. "Coward...!!" (臆病者...!! "Okubyōmono...!!"); 50. "I've Got To...!!" (私が...!! "Watashi ga...!!"); 51. "Beauty Is the Beast!!" (美しき野獣!! "Utsukushiki yajū!!"); 52. "The Principles of Use!!" (使用の条件!! "Shō no jōken!!"); 53. "Sakura's Decision!!" (サクラの決意!! "Sakura no ketsui!!"); 54. "Sakura and Ino" (サクラといの "Sakura to Ino")
For the second phase of the exams, the remaining teams of three must survive the Forest of Death and arrive at its center in five days' time. Soon after they enter the forest Team 7 is attacked by Rouge Ninja named Orochimaru. Naruto engages him in battle, though is quickly defeated by him who seals the demon fox's power. Sasuke, inspired by Naruto's determination, continues the battle in Naruto's place. Before escaping, Orochimaru brands Sasuke with a Cursed Seal of Heaven, knocking him out. Sakura, the only conscious member of the team, is forced to look after her teammates and defend them from the attacks of Orochimaru's followers. As she is about to be defeated, Team 10 arrives to help, allowing Sakura to return to attending to Naruto and Sasuke as the others deal with her attackers.
| 7 | The Path You Should Tread; Susumubeki michi...!! (進むべき道...!!) | May 1, 2001; 978-4088731131 | August 2, 2005; 978-1-59116-875-1 |
55. "No Holds Barred!!" (全面戦争!!, "Zenmen sensō!!"); 56. "The Strength That Is Given...!!" (与えられし力...!! "Ataerareshi chikara...!!"); 57. "Ten Hours Earlier..." (10時間前... "Jū jikan mae..."); 58. "Witnesses...!!" (目撃者...!! "Mokugekisha...!!"); 59. "The Tragedy of the Sand!!" (砂の惨劇!! "Suna no sangeki!!"); 60. "The Last Chance...!!" (ラストチャンス...!! "Rasuto Chansu...!!"); 61. "The Path You Should Tread...!!" (進むべき道...!! "Susumubeki michi...!!"); 62. "Trapped Like Rats!!" (袋のネズミ!! "Fukuro no nezumi!!"); 63. "One More Face" (もう一つの顔 "Mō hitotsu no kao")
Team 10 and Orochimaru's forces do battle, though their progress is slow in either side claiming victory. Just as additional reinforcements begin to arrive to help Team 10, Sasuke finally awakens, the Cursed Seal of Heaven given to him by Orochimaru fueling him with power. With his new strength, Sasuke is able to make quick work of their opponents, forcing them to give up and flee. Although the battle is won, Team 7 needs three days to recover. As they make way for the forest's center on the final day they are briefly impeded by a group of stragglers, though ultimately claim victory and complete the second phase.
| 8 | Life-and-Death Battles; Inochigake no tatakai!! (命懸けの戦い!!) | August 3, 2001; 978-4088731476 | December 6, 2005; 978-1-4215-0124-6 |
64. "Lord Hokage's Message...!!" (火影の伝令...!!, "Hokage no denrei...!!"); 65. "Life-and-Death Battles!!" (命懸けの戦い!! "Inochigake no tatakai!!"); 66. "Sakura's Advice" (サクラの勧告 "Sakura no kankoku"); 67. "Unholy Gifts!" (異端なる能力! "Itan naru nōryoku!"); 68. "Blood of the Uchiha" (うちはの血 "Uchiha no chi"); 69. "The Deadly Visitor!!" (恐怖の訪問者!! "Kyōfu no hōmonsha!!"); 70. "The One Who Dies!!" (死ぬのは!! "Shinu no wa!!"); 71. "The Insurmountable Wall...!!" (高すぎる壁...!! "Takasugiru kabe...!!"); 72. "Rivals...!!" (拮抗...!! "Kikkō...!!")
Seven teams of three pass the second phase, far too many aspiring ninja to advance to the final rounds. To reduce the number of participants ten preliminary matches are held, with the winner of each match advancing to the finals. After the first few matches, where Sasuke is able to claim victory using Lions Barrage without using Sharingan and Cursed Seal, Sakura is pit against her rival and childhood friend Ino Yamanaka. While neither is fond of fighting the other, both do their best to be worthy opponents. Although Sakura is able to avoid Ino's attacks for much of the match's duration, Ino is eventually able to restrain her. Using one of her family's signature abilities Ino takes control of Sakura's mind, intending to force Sakura to forget it the match.
| 9 | Neji vs. Hinata; Neji to Hinata (ネジとヒナタ) | October 4, 2001; 978-4088731742 | March 7, 2006; 978-1-4215-0239-7 |
73. "A Declaration of Defeat...?!" (敗北宣言...!?, "Haiboku sengen...?!"); 74. "The Sixth Round Match, and Then...!!" (第六回戦...そして!! "Dairoku kaisen... soshite!!"); 75. "Naruto's Coming-of-Age...!!" (ナルトの成長...!! "Naruto no seichō...!!"); 76. "Kiba Turns the Tables... and So Does Naruto?!" (キバの逆転!! ナルトの逆転 !!? "Kiba no gyukuten... Naruto no gyukuten?!"); 77. "Naruto's Clever Scheme!!" (ナルトの奇策!! "Naruto no kisaku!!"); 78. "Neji and Hinata" (ネジとヒナタ "Neji to Hinata"); 79. "The Hyuga Clan" (日向一族 "Hyūga ichizoku"); 80. "The Outer Limits" (限界を超えて "Genkai o koete"); 81. "Gaara Versus..." (我愛羅vs...)
Before she can be forced to surrender, Sakura is able to expel Ino from her mind using Inner Sakura. With both tired out from the ordeal, the match culminates in a double knock out, after which the two begin to rekindle their friendship. Naruto proves more fortunate in his own match, outsmarting his opponent, Team 8 member Kiba Inuzaka, to the surprise of the onlookers by defeating him using his Shadow Clone of Sasuke's Lions Barrage: Naruto Uzumaki Barrage. Naruto's success motivates Kiba's teammate Hinata Hyuga to do her best in the match against her cousin, Neji Hyuga. Neji, a stronger Genin Fighter who hates Hinata's family and is fatalistic, shows her no mercy during their fight. The match concludes with Hinata being left in critical condition and Neji showing no remorse for his treatment of one of his relatives. Naruto, enraged by Neji's actions and outlook, swears upon Hinata's spilled blood that he will defeat Neji in the final matches.
| 10 | A Splendid Ninja; Rippa na ninja...!! (立派な忍者...!!) | December 4, 2001; 978-4088731971 | June 6, 2006; 978-1-4215-0240-3 |
82. "Lee's Secret!!" (リーの秘密!!, "Rī no himitsu!!"); 83. "The Ultimate Defense... Crumbles?!" (絶対防御•崩壊!? "Zettai hōgyo, hōkai?!"); 84. "The Genius of Hard Work...!!" (努力の天才...!! "Doryoku no tensai...!!"); 85. "Now, of All Times...!!" (今こそ...!! "Ima koso...!!"); 86. "A Splendid Ninja...!!" (立派な忍者...!! "Rippa na ninja...!!"); 87. "The Preliminaries... Completed!!" (予選終了...!! "Yosen shūryō...!!"); 88. "What About Sasuke...?!" (サスケは...!? "Sasuke wa...?!"); 89. "Naruto's Wish...!!" (ナルトのお願い...!! "Naruto no onegai...!!"); 90. "What About My Training?!" (修業どーすんだ!? "Shūgyō dōsun'da?!")
As one of the last matches, Rock Lee is pit against Gaara. With his superior speed and strength Lee attempts to claim a quick victory using the Fifth Gate and Hidden Lotus, but is unable to fully bypass Gaara's superior defenses. After being left tired out from relentless assault, Lee is left unable to move and is left at Gaara's mercy. After his body is broken by Gaara's attacks and Gaara makes to finish him off, Gaara is declared the victor to prevent further damage to Lee. The preliminaries draw to a close and the finalists are assigned opponents for the finals in a month's time, leaving them plenty of time to recuperate and train. Naruto, eager to get ready for his match against Neji Hyuga, approaches Kakashi to help him train. Kakashi, having already decided to train Sasuke, encourages Naruto to find an alternative, which he does in the form of Jiraiya.
| 11 | Impassioned Efforts; Deshi'iri shigan!? (弟子入り志願 !?) | March 4, 2002; 4-08-873236-7 | September 5, 2006; 978-1-4215-0241-0 |
91. "Make Me Your Disciple?!" (弟子入り志願!?, "Deshi'iri shigan!?"); 92. "Konoha. vs. Sound vs. Sand" (木ノ葉と音と砂と...!! "Konoha to Oto to Suna to...!!"); 93. "Impassioned Efforts... Each and Every One!!" (熱情...それぞれ!! "Netsujō... sorezore!!"); 94. "The Key...!!" (鍵...!! "Kagi...!!"); 95. "A Chance Encounter...!!" (邂逅...!! "Kaikō...!!"); 96. "The Unexpected Visitor!!" (突然の来訪者!! "Totsuzen no raihōsha!!"); 97. "My Reason for Living...!!" (在り続ける理由!! "Ari tsuzukeru wake!!"); 98. "The Proud Failure!!" (誇り高き失敗者!! "Hokori takaki shippaisha!!"); 99. "The Finals Commence...!!" (本線、開始っ...!! "Honsen, kaishi...!!")
Soon after Jiraiya starts to train Naruto, he realizes that Naruto is the container of the Nine-Tailed Fox and breaks Orochimaru's seal on Naruto. Rather than give him the usual training regiment of preserving his strength, Jiraiya trains him to take advantage of the demon fox's power. Meanwhile, rumors of an impending invasion of Konoha by the villages of Otogakure and Sunagakure begin to spread, causing the Konoha ninja to begin preparing for the worst. For Naruto, his training consists of being taught how to summon toads to his side during battle. Although he struggles to get the hang of it at first, he is eventually able to take full advantage of the Nine-Tailed Fox and summon a biggest toad named Gamabunta. Naruto recovers from his training and, on the day of the finals, heads to the location of the final matches.
| 12 | The Great Flight!! Ōi naru hishō!! (大いなる飛翔!!) | May 1, 2002; 4-08-873259-6 | December 5, 2006; 978-1-4215-0242-7 |
100. "Prepared to Lose...!!" (玉砕覚悟!!, "Gyokusai kakugo!!"); 101. "The Other...!!" (もう一つの...!! "Mō hitotsu no...!!"); 102. "The Caged Bird...!!" (籠の中の鳥...!! "Kago no naka no tori...!!"); 103. "The Failure!!" (落ちこぼれ!! "Ochigobore!!"); 104. "The Power to Change...!!" (変える力...!! "Kaeru chikara...!!"); 105. "The Great Flight!!" (大いなる飛翔!! "Ōi naru hishō!!"); 106. "Sasuke Forfeits...?!" (サスケ失格...!? "Sasuke shikkaku...!?"); 107. "The Boy with No Fighting Spirit!!" (やる気ゼロの男!! "Yaruki zero no otoko!!"); 108. "A Plot Within a Plot...?!" (勝利への伏線...!? "Shōri e no fukusen...!?")
In the first match of the finals, Naruto gets to fight Neji Hyuga. With Neji being more naturally skilled than he is, Naruto is forced to call upon the dormant powers of the demon fox to get an even footing. The two ultimately clash, and after the smoke clears Neji appears to be the victor. Before he can be declared the winner, however, Naruto manages a successful sneak attack, which knocks Neji out and lets Naruto claim victory. For the next match, Shikamaru Nara fights Temari. Shikamaru uses his shadow to try to trap her, and although Temari tries to stay out of his shadow's range he is able to catch her. Though poised to win his match, Shikamaru forfeits instead due to the amount of energy wasted in trying to catch Temari.
| 13 | The Chûnin Exam, Concluded...!! Chūnin shiken, shūryō...!! (中忍試験、終了...!!) | August 2, 2002; 978-4088732985 | March 6, 2007; 978-1-4215-1087-3 |
109. "Tree Leaves, Dancing...!!" (木の葉、舞い...!!, "Konoha, mai...!!"); 110. "At Long Last...!!" (いよいよ...!! "Iyo iyo...!!"); 111. "Sasuke vs. Gaara!!" (サスケVS我愛羅!!); 112. "Sasuke's Taijutsu...!!" (サスケの体術...!! "Sasuke no taijutsu...!!"); 113. "The Reason He Was Late...!!" (遅刻の理由...!! "Chikoku no ryū...!!"); 114. "Violent Assault...!!" (強襲...!! "Kyōshū...!!"); 115. "The Chûnin Exam, Concluded...!!" (中忍試験、終了...!! "Chūnin shiken, shūryō...!!"); 116. "Operation Destroy Konoha...!!" (木ノ葉崩し...!! "Konoha kuzushi...!!"); 117. "The Imparted Mission...!!" (下された任務...!! "Kudasareta ninmu...!!")
Sasuke begins his match with Gaara by trying, like Rock Lee, to bypass his defenses. When he too proves unsuccessful, he readies an attack taught to him by Kakashi: Chidori (千鳥; lit. "One Thousand Birds"). Just as he use it to break through Gaara's defenses, the invasion of Konoha starts, ending the finals. Orochimaru, the mastermind behind the invasion, takes the Third Hokage Hiruzen Sarutobi, Konoha's leader, hostage and the two begin to fight. As invading forces pour into Konoha, Sasuke pursues a fleeing Gaara. Not wanting Sasuke to get too far away, but not able to follow him personally, Kakashi sends Sakura, Naruto, and Shikamaru to stop him.
| 14 | Hokage vs. Hokage!! 火影VS火影!! | November 1, 2002; 4-08-873341-X | May 1, 2007; 978-1-4215-1088-0 |
118. "Detainment...!!" (足止め...!!, "Ashidome...!!"); 119. "The Life I Wanted...!!" (オレの人生...!! "Ore no jinsei...!!"); 120. "Hokage vs. Hokage!!" (火影VS火影!!); 121. "The Terrible Experiment...!!" (恐るべき実験...!! "Osorubeki jikken...!!"); 122. "The Bestowed Will!!" (受け継がれてゆく意志!! "Uketsugarete yuku ishi!!"); 123. "The Final Seal" (最後の封印 "Saigo no fūin"); 124. "The Eternal Battle...!!" (永遠なる闘い...!! "Eien naru tatakai...!!"); 125. "The Time of Awakening...!!" (目覚めの時...!! "Mezame no toki...!!"); 126. "Off Guard...!!" (油断...!! "Yudan...!!")
Orochimaru, a former student of the Third Hokage that is eager to kill his old master, resurrects the First Hokage Hashirama Senju and Second Hokage Tobimara Senju, the Third's former teachers, to fight him. Needing to get rid of the two if he is to defeat Orochimaru, the Third seals away their souls. The Third attempts to seal Orochimaru's soul as well, but is stabbed in the back before he can complete the sealing. Elsewhere, Naruto, Sakura, and Shikamaru discover that they are being followed by some of Konoha's invaders, and Shikamaru opts to stay behind to stall them. Using the strength left over from his fight with Temari he buys them the necessary time. Meanwhile, Sasuke catches up with Gaara and Kankuro prepares to hold Sasuke off while Gaara escapes with Temari. Before they can begin, Shino Aburame arrives to fight Kankuro, allowing Sasuke to proceed. As Shino directs his bugs to Kankuro's location. They consume his chakra once they get there, causing Kankuro to collapse. The battle won, Shino also collapses due to Kankuro's poison.
| 15 | Naruto's Ninja Handbook! Naruto ninpōchō!! (ナルト忍法帖!!) | December 20, 2002; 4-08-873368-1 | July 3, 2007; 978-1-4215-1089-7 |
127. "To Feel Alive...!!" (生の実感...!!), "Sei no jikkan...!!"); 128. "Exceeding One's Limits...!!" (限界を超えて...!! "Genkai o koete...!!"); 129. "To Hurt...!!!" (痛み...!! "Itami...!!"); 130. "Love...!!" (愛情...!! "Aijō...!!"); 131. "The Name Gaara...!!" (我愛羅という名...!! "Gaara to iu na...!!"); 132. "The Two... Darkness and Light" (二人...闇と光 "Futari... Yami to hikari"); 133. "Those Who Are Strong...!!" (強き者...!! "Tsuyokimono...!!"); 134. "Naruto's Ninja Handbook!" (ナルト忍法帖!! "Naruto ninpōchō!!"); 135. "The Gale-Like Battle...!!" (嵐の如き戦い!! "Arashi no gotoki tatakai!!")
Sasuke catches up with Gaara, just in time to witness the beginnings of Gaara's transformation. As he begins to assume a monstrous form, Gaara is given enough speed and strength to overcome Sasuke's Chidori. As Gaara is about to finish him off, Naruto arrives to fight save him and fight in his place. After Naruto taps into the power of the demon fox sealed within him, Gaara completes his transformation becoming a life-size replica of Shukaku, the One-Tailed Raccoon sealed within him. To compete with this giant form, Naruto summons Gamabunta he can muster. The giant toad clashes with Shukaku and Naruto, hoping to end the battle quickly white the demon fox's power, tries to bring Gaara to his senses.
| 16 | Eulogy; Konoha kuzushi, shūketsu!! (木ノ葉崩し、終結!!) | March 4, 2003; 4-08-873394-0 | September 4, 2007; 978-1-4215-1090-3 |
136. "The Last Blow...!!" (最後の一撃...!!, "Saigo no ichigeki...!!"); 137. "The Shinobi of Konoha...!!" (木ノ葉の忍...!! "Konoha no shinobi...!!"); 138. "Operation Destroy Konoha, Terminated!!" (木ノ葉崩し、終結!! "Konoha kuzushi, shūketsu!!"); 139. "Eulogy...!!" (その者の名は...!! "Sono mono no na wa...!!"); 140. "Contact...!!" (接近...!! "Sekkin...!!"); 141. "Uchiha Itachi!!" (うちはイタチ!!); 142. "Kakashi vs. Itachi" (カカシvsイタチ); 143. "The Fourth Hokage's Legacy!!" (四代目の遺産!! "Yondaime no isan!!"); 144. "The Pursuers" (追跡者 "Tsuisekisha")
Naruto headbutts Gaara, causing the Shukaku form to recede. The two have one final exchange of blows and Naruto is able to claim victory while also redeeming Gaara. Meanwhile, the Third Hokage realizes that he lacks the strength needed to fully seal Orochimaru's soul. Doing what little he can he seals Orochimaru's arms instead, ending the invasion at the cost of his life. Orochimaru and the invaders flee, and Konoha begins to rebuild. Jiraiya, with Naruto's assistance, sets out to find a new Hokage, hoping that his old teammate, Tsunade, will take the job. As they leave, Itachi Uchiha and Kisame Hoshigaki infiltrate Konoha and are engaged in battle by Konoha's elite ninja. The two prove too much for Konoha's forces, and even Kakashi is left beaten after fighting the two. Before they leave Kakashi is able to learn that they are members of Akatsuki who seek to capture Naruto for the demon fox sealed within him. Sasuke learns of this and, having a prior desire to kill his older brother, Itachi, races out to find Naruto before they do.
| 17 | Itachi's Power; Itachi no chikara!! (イタチの能力!!) | May 1, 2003; 4-08-873420-3 | September 4, 2007; 978-1-4215-1652-3 |
145. "Memories of Despair" (絶望の記憶, "Zetsubō no kioku"); 146. "Along with Hatred...!!" (憎悪とともに...!! "Zōo to tomo ni...!!"); 147. "It's My Fight!!" (オレの戦い!! "Ore no tatakai!!"); 148. "Itachi's Power!!" (イタチの能力!! "Itachi no chikara!!); 149. "The Legendary...!!" (伝説の...!! "Densetsu no...!!"); 150. "Training Begins...?!" (修行開始...!? "Shūgyō kaishi...!?"); 151. "The Hook...!!" (きっかけ...!! "Kikkake...!!"); 152. "The Second State" (第二段階 "Daini dankai"); 153. "The Searchers!!" (捜索者たち!! "Sōsakusha-tachi")
Once finding Naruto, Itachi and Kisame try to take him with them. Before they can do so, however, Sasuke arrives, ready to kill Itachi for murdering their family and clan years earlier. Despite Sasuke's efforts, Itachi is more than capable of dealing with him, and it is not until the arrival of Jiraiya that they are driven off. Sasuke is sent back to Konoha to recover, and Naruto and Jiraiya continue their search. As they travel from town to town trying to locate Tsunade, Jiraiya begins teaching Naruto how to use the Rasengan (螺旋丸; lit. spiral sphere, English manga: "Spiral Chakra Sphere"). As Naruto slowly progresses through the learning stages, Orochimaru, in need of a way to heal his arms if he is to attack Konoha again, also sets out to find Tsunade, her medical expertise being the only thing that can help him.
| 18 | Tsunade's Choice; Tsunade no ketsui (綱手の決意!!) | August 4, 2003; 4-08-873493-9 | September 4, 2007; 978-1-4215-1653-0 |
154. "Convergence...!!" (到達...!!, "Tōtatsu...!!"); 155. "The Third State" (第三段階 "Daisan dankai"); 156. "The Offer" (取り引き "Torihiki"); 157. "Tsunade's Answer...?!" (答えは...!? "Kotae wa...!?"); 158. "No Forgiveness...!!" (許さねぇ...!! "Yurusane...!!"); 159. "The Wager...!!" (賭け...!! "Kake...!!"); 160. "The Necklace of Death...!!" (死の首飾り...!! "Shi no kubikazari...!!"); 161. "Tsunade's Choice!!" (綱手の決意!! "Tsunade no ketsui"); 162. "A Vulnerable Heart...!!" (抗えぬ心...!! "Aragaenu kokoro...!!")
Orochimaru tracks down Tsunade and makes her an offer: heal his arms and in exchange he will revive her dead brother and lover. He gives her a week to consider it and leaves. Soon afterwards Jiraiya and Naruto find her and offer her the title of Hokage. She turns down the offer, instead choosing to insult the former Hokage. Naruto, enraged, attacks her with an incomplete Rasengan. Intrigued by his progress, Tsunade makes a bet with him: that he cannot perfect the Rasengan in a week. Naruto, determined to prove her wrong, accepts and dedicates his time to completing the attack. Once the week is up and he appears to have been unsuccessful, Tsunade, disappointed in his progress, goes to meet Orochimaru.
| 19 | Successor; Uketsugumono (受け継ぐ者) | November 4, 2003; 4-08-873523-4 | October 2, 2007; 978-1-4215-1654-7 |
163. "Undecayed...!!" (朽ちぬもの...!!, "Kuchinumono...!!"); 164. "Medical Specialists!!" (医療忍者!! "Supesharisuto!!"); 165. "Naruto Attacks!!" (ナルト、突撃っ!! "Naruto, totsugeki!!"); 166. "Shinobi Skills...!!" (忍の才能...!! "Shinobi no sainō...!!"); 167. "As Promised...!!" (約束通り...!! "Yakusoku dōri...!!"); 168. "Once More" (もう一度だけ "Mō ichido dake"); 169. "Risking Everything...!!" (命を懸ける...!! "Inochi o kakeru...!!"); 170. "Deadlock!!!" (三竦みの攻防!! "Sansukumi no kōbō!!"); 171. "Successor" (受け継ぐ者 "Uketsugumono")
Tsunade meets with Orochimaru, though rather than heal him she tries to kill him. Unwilling to see her loved ones if it would mean the destruction of Konoha, Tsunade is drawn into battle with Orochimaru's assistant, Kabuto Yakushi. Kabuto is eventually able to immobilize her, forcing the newly arrived Jiraiya and Naruto to defend her; Jiraiya battling Orochimaru and Naruto fighting Kabuto. Although Kabuto appears in control of the battle, Naruto is able to deliver a perfected Rasengan to his stomach in an attempt to protect Tsunade. Inspired by Naruto's winning of their bet, Tsunade overcomes her restraints and joins Jiraiya in attacking Orochimaru. Unable to do combat with both of them, Orochimaru escapes with Kabuto. Once Naruto recovers, Tsunade decides to accept the title of Hokage, and returns with him and Jiraiya to Konoha.
| 20 | Naruto vs. Sasuke ナルトvsサスケ!! | December 19, 2003; 4-08-873552-8 | October 2, 2007; 978-1-4215-1655-4 |
172. "The Return" (帰郷, "Kikyō"); 173. "Anguish" (苦悩する者たち "Kunōsurumono-tachi"); 174. "Feelings...!" (想い、それぞれ...! "Omoi, sorezore...!"); 175. "Naruto vs. Sasuke!!" (ナルトvsサスケ!!); 176. "Rivals" (ライバルというもの "Raibaru to iu mono"); 177. "The Sound Ninja Four" (音の四人衆 "Oto no yoninshū"); 178. "Invitation...!!" (音の誘い...!! "Oto no izanai...!!"); 179. "Never Forget...!!" (忘れるな...!! "Wasureruna...!!"); 180. "A Promise!!" (約束だ!! "Yakusoku da!!")
Upon returning, Tsunade tends to a number of injuries that have yet to be fully healed. Rock Lee, his injuries from his fight with Gaara too severe to be healed by regular medics, proves her most difficult case. After inspecting the damage to his body Tsunade advises that he give up his life as a ninja, though Lee insists taking the operation. Meanwhile, Sasuke, recovered but angry with himself for being so easily defeated by Itachi, begins to search earnestly for any means to get stronger. In doing so he forces Naruto to fight him, though his spirits are only dampened further when Naruto's Rasengan proves stronger than his Chidori. To draw Sasuke further down the path of vengeance, Orochimaru sends his Sound Four to confront Sasuke and show him the strength that can be gained by joining them.
| 21 | Pursuit; Yurusenai!! (許せない!!) | March 4, 2004; 4-08-873573-0 | October 2, 2007; 978-1-4215-1855-8 |
181. "The Battle Begins...!!" (闘いの始まり...!!, "Tatakai no hajimari...!!"); 182. "Assemble!!" (集結!! "Shūketsu!!"); 183. "The Promise" (一生の約束 "Isshō no yakusoku"); 184. "Sound vs. Leaf!!" (音vs木ノ葉!! "Oto vs Konoha!!"); 185. "Pursuit...!!" (音を追え...!! "Oto o oe...!!"); 186. "Failure...?!" (作戦...失敗!? "Sakusen... shippai!?"); 187. "The Plea...!!" (命乞い...!! "Inochigoi...!!"); 188. "The Shinobi of Konohagakure...!!" (木ノ葉隠れの忍...!! "Konohakagure no shinobi"); 189. "Faith...!!" (信じる力...!! "Shinjiru chikara...!!"); 190. "Unforgivable!!" (許せない!! "Yurusenai!!")
Sasuke decides to go to Orochimaru in order to get stronger and accompanies the Sound Four back to his lair after coldly rejecting Sakura, who tried to bring him back and confessing his fellings. Upon learning of Sasuke's defection, Naruto accompanies the now Chunnin Shikamaru in assembling a team to retrieve him, and the two gather Neji, Kiba, and Choji Akimichi to their cause. The team pursues the Sound Four until they are trapped by Sound Four member Jirobo, who distracts them while the rest of the Sound Four goes on ahead. Choji is able to free the team from Jirobo, and begins to do battle with him while the others continue their pursuit. Choji and Jirobo have a battle of strengths, with Choji eventually beating Jirobo to death.
| 22 | Comrades; Tensei...!! (転生...!!) | April 30, 2004; 4-08-873595-1 | November 6, 2007; 978-1-4215-1858-9 |
191. "Comrades...!!" (仲間...!!, "Nakama...!!"); 192. "The Plan...!!" (段取り...!! "Dandori...!!"); 193. "Game Over" (ゲームオーバー "Gēmu Ōbā"); 194. "Taking Stock" (さぐりあい "Saguriai"); 195. "Capture...!!" (攻略法...!! "Kōryaku hō...!!"); 196. "The Strongest Enemy!!" (一番強い敵!! "Ichiban tsuyoi teki!!"); 197. "Prepared to Die!!" (決死の覚悟!! "Kesshi no kakugo!!"); 198. "Transference...!!" (転生...!! "Tensei...!!"); 199. "The Wish...!!" (願望...!! "Ganbō...!!")
Once the retrieval team catches up with the Sound Four, Kidomaru uses his web to trap them. Neji frees the team from the bindings and sends the others after the remaining Sound Four members. Kidomaru attacks Neji from afar, slowly studying his actions to devise a way to defeat him. Using the silk he produces to create a bow and arrow, Kidomaru begins firing shots at a blindspot in Neji's defenses, eventually succeeding in hitting his target. Neji, however, is able to survive the attack, and uses the arrow that pierced him to kill Kidomaru. Elsewhere, Orochimaru earnestly awaits Sasuke's arrival, planning to take Sasuke's body for himself to regain the use of his arms. Although he puts it off for as long as he can, Orochimaru is forced to take a different body, planning to instead take Sasuke's body at a later date.
| 23 | Predicament; Kukyō...!! (苦境...!!) | August 4, 2004; 4-08-873639-7 | November 6, 2007; 978-1-4215-1859-6 |
200. "According to Plan...!!" (計算通り...!!, "Keisan dōri...!!"); 201. "Miscalculation...!!" (計算違い...!! "Keisan chigai...!!"); 202. "Three Wishes!!" (三つの願い!! "Mittsu no negai!!"); 203. "Sakon's Secret" (左近の秘密 "Sakon no himitsu"); 204. "Ukon's Prowess" (右近の能力 "Ukon no nōryoku"); 205. "Kiba's Decision!!" (キバの決意!! "Kiba no ketsui!!"); 206. "Predicament...!!" (苦境...!! "Kukyō...!!"); 207. "Deadlocked" (飛車角落ち "Hisha kakuochi"); 208. "Fake-Out!!" (一手目はフェイク!! "Itteme wa feiku!!")
After the remaining portion of the retrieval team catches up with the Sound Four again, Naruto, Shikamaru, and Kiba split up to fight the remaining Sound Four members individually. Kiba battles with Sakon and Ukon while Shikamaru fights Tayuya. The Sound Four members overwhelm the Konoha ninja, and they are left on the verge of defeat. Meanwhile, Kimimaro, a former member of the Sound Four sent to continue the task of bringing Sasuke to Orochimaru, is forced to fight Naruto. Despite Naruto's best efforts, Kimimaro is able to buy enough time for Sasuke to continue on his own.
| 24 | Unorthodox; Pinchi pinchi pinchi!! (ピンチ·ピンチ·ピンチ!!) | October 4, 2004; 4-08-873660-5 | November 6, 2007; 978-1-4215-1860-2 |
209. "Help Arrives!!" (助っ人、参上!!, "Suketto, sanjō!!"); 210. "Lee's Secret!!" (リーの秘密!! "Rī no himitsu"); 211. "Unorthodox...!!" (変則的...!! "Hensokuteki...!!"); 212. "Danger Danger Danger!!" (ピンチ•ピンチ•ピンチ!! "Pinchi pinchi pinchi!!"); 213. "Debt...!!" (大きな借り...!! "Ōki na kari...!!"); 214. "Retreat...!!" (いったん退いて...!! "Ittan hiite...!!"); 215. "Gaara of the Sand" (砂漠の我愛羅 "Sabaku no Gaara"); 216. "Halberd and Shield...!!" (矛と盾...!! "Hoku to tate...!!"); 217. "For the Most Precious" (大切な者の為に "Taisetsu na mono no tame ni")
Determined to go after Sasuke, Naruto contemplates how to defeat Kimimaro. Rock Lee, having recovered from his surgery, soon arrives to fight Kimimaro in his place, allowing Naruto to continue on. Despite briefly gaining the upper hand, Lee, like Kiba and Shikamaru, is forced onto the defensive, and it is not until the arrival of Gaara, Temari, and Kankuro that they are all saved. Temari crushes Tayuya under a pile of debris and Kankuro kills Sakon and Ukon with a barrage of weapons. Gaara proves to have a more difficult fight, as Kimimaro is continually able to recover from his attacks. As Kimimaro is about to kill Gaara and Lee via a sneak attack, he dies of the illness that forced him to leave the Sound Four. Their battles won, the Konoha ninja return home with their saviors, just as Naruto catches up with Sasuke and the Valley of the End, a landmark where the First Hokage similarly fought Sasuke's ancestor Madara Uchiha.
| 25 | Brothers; Itachi to Sasuke (兄と弟) | December 3, 2004; 978-4088736792 | December 4, 2007; 978-1-4215-1861-9 |
218. "Konohagakure Comrades!!" (木ノ葉の仲間!!, "Konoha no nakama!!"); 219. "Future and Past" (未来と過去 "Mirai to kako"); 220. "Brothers" (兄と弟 "Itachi to Sasuke"); 221. "Out of Reach" (遠すぎる兄 "Tōsugiru ani"); 222. "Itachi Accused" (イタチの疑惑 "Itachi no giwaku"); 223. "Father and Son" (サスケと父 "Sasuke to chichi"); 224. "That Day...!!" (その日...!! "Sono hi...!!"); 225. "In Darkness...!!" (闇の中...!! "Yami no naka...!!"); 226. "For a Friend...!!" (親しき友に...!! "Shitashiki tomo ni...!!")
Naruto tries to reason with Sasuke, though Sasuke is uninterested in returning to Konoha. As the two start to fight Sasuke remembers why he became so determined to gain power and kill Itachi. Sasuke spent his childhood trying to win his family's recognition, though their interest was always focused on Itachi and his prodigious skills. Just when Itachi began to distance himself from the clan and Sasuke started to enjoy his family's attention, he returned home one day to find that Itachi had killed their entire family. Deciding to spare Sasuke, Itachi gave him words of advice: in order to become strong enough to kill him and avenge the clan, Sasuke need only strive for power. To help Sasuke down this path, Itachi told Sasuke how to gain the Uchiha clan's most powerful ability, the Mangekyo Sharingan (万華鏡写輪眼, Mangekyō Sharingan; lit. "Kaleidoscope Copy Wheel Eye"): simply kill your closest friend. Having since come to find Naruto to be his closest friend, Sasuke prepares do just that, finding the loss of Naruto to be an adequate payment for the strength needed to kill Itachi once and for all.
| 26 | Awakening; Wakare no hi...!! (別れの日...!!) | February 4, 2005; 4-08-873770-9 | December 4, 2007; 978-1-4215-1862-6 |
227. "Chidori vs. Rasengan!!" ("千鳥VS螺旋丸!!"); 228. "Kakashi's Premonition" (カカシの予感 "Kakashi no yokan"); 229. "The Bond...!!" (繋がり...!! "Tsunagari...!!"); 230. "Awakening!!" (目醒めの時!! "Mezame no toki!!"); 231. "Special!!" (特別な力!! "Tokubetsu na chikara!!"); 232. "The Final Valley" (終末の谷 "Shūmatsu no tani"); 233. "The Worst Ending...!!" (最悪の結末...!! "Saiaku no ketsumatsu...!!"); 234. "Parting Ways...!!" (別れの日...!! "Wakare no hi...!!"); 235. "Mission Failed...!!" (任務失敗...!! "Ninmu shippai...!!")
Naruto and Sasuke prove equally matched. In attempts to gain victory, each calls upon their unique strengths: Naruto and the demon fox's power, Sasuke and his Cursed Seal's reserves. Naruto and Sasuke fuel their sources of strength into their Vermilion Rasengan and Dark Chidori, respectively, and attack one another. Once the energy created by the clash dissipates, Sasuke stands over a defeated Naruto, though his injuries leave him little better off. Although he contemplates killing Naruto he eventually decides against it, realizing that that is what Itachi would want. Deciding to get power in his own way, Sasuke pardons to Naruto and goes to Orochimaru, ready for whatever is necessary to get stronger. Kakashi arrives too late to retrieve Naruto and take him back to Konoha, where he, like the rest of the retrieval team, are healed.
| 27 | Departure; Tabidachi no hi!! (旅立ちの日!!) | April 4, 2005; 4-08-873791-1 | December 4, 2007; 978-1-4215-1863-3 |
236. "A Broken Promise" (守れなかった約束, "Mamorenakatta yakusoku"); 237. "Fool...!!" (馬鹿...!! "Baka...!!"); 238. "Departure!!" (旅立ちの日!! "Tabidachi no hi!!"); 239. "Chronicle 1: The Mission Begins...!!" (外伝其ノ一:任務開始...!! "Gaiden sono ichi: Misshon Sutāto...!!"); 240. "Chronicle 2: Teamwork!!" (外伝其ノ二:チームワーク!! "Gaiden sono ni: Chīmuwāku!!"); 241. "Chronicle 3: A True Hero" (外伝其ノ三:本当の英雄!! "Gaiden sono san: Hontō no eiyū!!"); 242. "Chronicle 4: The Crybaby Ninja" (外伝其ノ四:泣き虫忍者 "Gaiden sono yon: Nakimushi ninja"); 243. "Chronicle 5: A Gift" (外伝其ノ五:プレゼント "Gaiden sono go: Purezento"); 244. "Chronicle 6: Sharingan Hero" (外伝最終話:写輪眼の英雄 "Gaiden saishūwa: Sharingan no eiyū")
As Naruto recovers from his injuries, he and Sakura vow to bring Sasuke back together. To prepare for their next encounter with Sasuke, Sakura becomes Tsunade's apprentice, while Naruto leaves with Jiraiya to train under him for two-and-a-half years. In the intermission between Naruto's departure and eventual return, the story of Kakashi Gaiden, detailing Kakashi's origins, is told. During the Third Great Ninja War, Kakashi, along with his teammate Obito Uchiha, went to rescue their teammate Rin Nohara from the enemy. They were attacked by enemy ninja, who proceeded to permanently scar Kakashi's eye and crush Obito under a boulder. As his dying act, Obito gives his Sharingan to Kakashi, who woefully leaves with Rin and is rescued by their sensei, the future Fourth Hokage Minato Namikaze.

== See also ==
- List of Naruto chapters (Part II, volumes 28–48)
- List of Naruto chapters (Part II, volumes 49–72)
