= Naruto Shippuden the Movie: The Will of Fire =

2009 Japanese anime film directed by Masahiko Murata

- Directed by: Masahiko Murata
- Written by: Junki Takegami
- Produced by: Mikihito Fukazawa; Fukashi Azuma; Naoji Hōnokidani
- Starring: Junko Takeuchi; Chie Nakamura; Kazuhiko Inoue; Satoshi Hino; Noriaki Sugiyama; Showtaro Morikubo; Ryoka Yuzuki; Yoichi Masukawa; Shinji Kawada; Kousuke Toriumi; Nana Mizuki; Yukari Tamura; Koichi Tochika
- Cinematography: Atsuho Matsumoto
- Edited by: Yukie Oikawa; Seiji Morita
- Music by: Yasuharu Takanashi; Yaiba
- Production company: Studio Pierrot
- Distributed by: Toho
- Release date: August 1, 2009
- Running time: 96 minutes
- Country: Japan
- Language: Japanese
- Box office: ¥1.02 billion (US$8.1 million)

Naruto Shippuden the Movie: The Will of Fire (Japanese: 劇場版 NARUTO(ナルト) 疾風伝 火の意志を継ぐ者, Hepburn: Gekijō-ban Naruto Shippūden Hi no Ishi wo Tsugumono; lit. "Inheritance of the Will of Fire"), is a 2009 animated martial arts fantasy film and the sixth Naruto film overall, specifically the third Naruto: Shippuden film, which takes as its basis the popular anime and manga series. Released on August 1, 2009, in theaters in Japan (Maramusa Notari planned to release a DVD on April 21, 2010), it uses the advertising tagline Todoke, ore-tachi no Omoi! (届け、オレたちの想い！, We will deliver our desires to everyone!).

The Naruto 10th Anniversary site unveiled the film, and the teaser was shown along with the preview of "The Three-Tails Arrival" anime arc. The official website of the Naruto: Shippuden anime has put up the promotional video of the film.

It was released in North America on October 23, 2012, by Viz Media. The movie is set after the episode 126 of the Naruto: Shippuden anime series.

== Plot ==
A puppet Curse

In the potential outbreak of a 4th Great Ninja World War, a few ninjas with Kekkei Genkai (血継限界; lit. 'bloodline trait') abilities had disappeared from the land of Lightning, Earth, Water & Wind. The Land of Fire remains the only village not affected by these events, so people start to suspect its role in these incidents, & rumors of a possible rebellion begin to circulate. With the other nations amassing troops on the borders of the Land of Fire & threatening invasion, the Feudal Lord of the Land of Fire orders Tsunade to capture the real culprit & prove Konoha's innocence, in the event of failure, the Land of Fire will destroy the village to preserve world peace.

Hiruko is both a missing-nin culprit & a former friend of the Legendary Sannin (Orochimaru, Jiraiya and Tsunade), who left the village long ago after developing the Chimera Technique, a Jutsu that allows the user to absorb both the chakra & Kekkei Genkai of other ninjas. Based in Mount Shumi with his followers, Ichi, Ni & San, Hiruko uses a Jutsu to project himself onto the skies above Konoha, announcing that he'll obtain the Kekkei Genkai of the Land of Fire & become both immortal & invincible, instigate the 4th Great Ninja World War & conquer the world. With Hiruko intending to use the power of a solar eclipse to carry out his plan, a race to defeat him begins, as the moment of the eclipse draws near.

Hiruko targets the Land of Fire's Kekkei Genkai, Kakashi Hatake's Sharingan (写輪眼; lit. 'Copy Wheel Eye", English manga: "Mirror Wheel Eye'). One night, Hiruko activates a Puppet Curse placed on Kakashi over 10 years ago. Kakashi asks Tsunade to allow him to go, so he can defeat Hiruko. Before he leaves, Kakashi asks Tsunade to place a special seal on him that will automatically activate Kamui, when Hiruko attempts to absorb him. Under the influence of Hiruko's Puppet Curse, Kakashi leaves the village. At the Hokage's office, Tsunade labels Kakashi as a missing-nin & orders everyone from the village (without any further orders from her) to stay away from Kakashi. Upon hearing of his desertion, Naruto Uzumaki & Sakura Haruno leave the village to rescue their teacher. Team 8, Team 10 & Team Guy are sent to retrieve them.

Naruto, Sakura & Sai follow Kakashi & defeat Hiruko's subordinates. Eventually, they reach the temple, where Hiruko awaits for Kakashi. Naruto enters the temple alone, where Hiruko starts the eclipse & the absorption. However, Kakashi's Mangekyo Sharingan (万華鏡写輪眼, Mangekyō Sharingan; lit. 'Kaleidoscope Copy Wheel Eye') activates, & the space inside the slime created by the Chimera Technique begins to distort. Naruto saves Kakashi, breaking into the slime with multiple Rasengan (螺旋丸, lit. spiral sphere, English manga: "Spiral Chakra Sphere") before pulling him out, but Hiruko remains alive. He states that the eclipse continues & releases a large amount of chakra, reducing the surrounding area to rubble. Hiruko summons a chimera beast. Team 8, Team 10 & Team Guy work together to defeat the chimera beast. Naruto & Kakashi battle Hiruko, who easily absorbs their attacks, Raikiri & Oodoma Rasengan. Naruto finally attacks Hiruko with Futon: Rasenshuriken (Wind Release (Wind Style): Rasenshuriken), which Hiruko fails to absorb & dies from his injuries. The ninjas celebrate their victory at Mount Shumi.

After the credits, a note from Masashi Kishimoto says, "I hope this movie stays with you forever..."

== Voice cast ==
| Character | Japanese | English |
|---|---|---|
| Naruto Uzumaki | Junko Takeuchi | Maile Flanagan |
| Kakashi Hatake | Kazuhiko Inoue | Dave Wittenberg |
| Sakura Haruno | Chie Nakamura | Kate Higgins |
| Sai | Satoshi Hino | Ben Diskin |
| Shikamaru Nara | Showtaro Morikubo | Tom Gibis |
| Choji Akimichi | Kentarō Itō | Robbie Rist |
| Ino Yamanaka | Ryōka Yuzuki | Colleen Villard |
| Kiba Inuzuka | Kōsuke Toriumi | Kyle Hebert |
| Hinata Hyuga | Nana Mizuki | Stephanie Sheh |
| Shino Aburame | Shinji Kawada | Derek Stephen Prince |
| Rock Lee | Yōichi Masukawa | Brian Donovan |
| Neji Hyuga | Kōichi Tōchika | Steve Staley |
| Tenten | Yukari Tamura | Danielle Judovits |
| Jiraiya | Hōchū Ōtsuka | David Lodge |
| Tsunade | Masako Katsuki | Debi Mae West |
| Shizune | Keiko Nemoto | Megan Hollingshead |
| Gaara | Akira Ishida | Liam O'Brien |
| Kankuro | Yasuyuki Kase | Doug Erholtz |
| Temari | Romi Park | Tara Platt |
| Kotetsu Hagane | Tomoyuki Kōno | Liam O'Brien |
| Izumo Kamizuki | Tomohiro Tsuboi | Richard Cansino |
| Teuchi | Eisuke Asakura | Lex Lang |
| Hiruzen Sarutobi | Hidekatsu Shibata | Steve Kramer |
| Asuma Sarutobi | Jūrōta Kosugi | Doug Erholtz |
| Sasuke Uchiha | Noriaki Sugiyama | Yuri Lowenthal |
| Obito Uchiha | Sōsuke Komori | Vic Mignogna |
| Rin Nohara | Haruhi Terada | Stephanie Sheh |
| Taiseki | Kanji Suzumori | Kirk Thornton |
| Hiruko | Sōichirō Hoshi | Todd Haberkorn |
| Ichi | Yoshimitsu Shimoyama | Patrick Seitz |
| Ni | Junko Minagawa | Laura Bailey |
| San | Hideo Watanabe | Matthew Mercer |

== Critical reception ==
Carlo Santos of Anime News Network gave the film a C+ rating. In his review, he commended the film for its fluid action scenes, background art and connections to major plot points from the series but criticized the poor execution of the plot into a conventional Shōnen Jump formula with little complexion, concluding with, "If only the staff had put as much effort into the storytelling as they did for the animation, perhaps this would have come out as a more complete product."
