= Naruto the Movie: Legend of the Stone of Gelel =

2005 film

Naruto the Movie: Legend of the Stone Gelel
- Theatrical release poster
- Directed by: Hirotsugu Kawasaki
- Written by: Hirotsugu Kawasaki; Yuka Miyata
- Starring: Junko Takeuchi; Chie Nakamura; Gamon Kaai; Akio Nojima
- Music by: Toshio Masuda
- Production company: Studio Pierrot
- Distributed by: Toho
- Release date: August 6, 2005
- Running time: 97 minutes
- Country: Japan
- Language: Japanese
- Box office: ¥1.18 billion (US$10.2 million)

Naruto the Movie: Legend of the Stone of Gelel (劇場版 NARUTO(ナルト) 大激突!幻の地底遺跡だってばよ, Gekijō-ban Naruto Daigekitotsu! Maboroshi no Chiteiiseki Dattebayo; lit. 'Theatrical Feature Naruto: Great Clash! The Illusionary Ruins at the Depths of the Earth') is a 2005 Japanese animated martial arts fantasy adventure film based on Masashi Kishimoto's manga and anime franchise, written by Hirotsugu Kawasaki and Yuka Miyata. It was released in theaters in Japan on August 6, 2005.

Unlike Ninja Clash in the Land of Snow, Legend of the Stone of Gelel became a direct-to-video film in the United States. It aired on Cartoon Network's Toonami block on July 26, 2008, and was released to DVD on July 29, 2008. The film is set after episode 160 of the Naruto anime series. The theme song "Ding! Dong! Dang!" is performed by TUBE.

== Plot ==
At a desolated beach, a night-time battle rages between the sand ninjas and bulky, robot-like, armored warriors. Gaara and the group of sand ninjas gain the upper-hand and when the remaining warriors begin to retreat back into the ocean, they shoot flares into the night to reveal a large warship waiting just offshore.

Meanwhile, Naruto Uzumaki, Shikamaru Nara and Sakura Haruno are on a mission to recover a lost pet ferret when they too are attacked by the armored warriors as well as a mysterious knight named Temujin. After a short battle, both Temujin and Naruto are blasted off a nearby cliff. Shikamaru and Sakura run to the edge to see if they can spot their friend, when suddenly a massive machine, like a giant moving cathedral, plows through the forest and comes to rest not far away. Naruto and Temujin wake up to find themselves in a moving caravan led by Kahiko and Emina.

Luckily the ferret, Nerugui, has survived the fall and has taken a liking to Temujin much to the chagrin of Kahiko whom Naruto discovers is the person who ordered the mission. Shikamaru investigates the cathedral and discovers a room filled with pods containing human beings. He witnesses two people, Kamina and Ranke, associates to Temujin, appear to activate the pods, which seem to use the humans to place souls in each armored, soldier body. Temujin leaves the caravan to return to his own party with Naruto in tow. Back at the cathedral, Temujin introduces Naruto to a man named Master Haido.

Haido informs Naruto and Temujin about the Gelel Stone, a mysterious, powerful mineral which controls the traveling caravan and which the annihilated clan lost. Haido plans to get the stone in order to make the world at peace. Naruto and Temujin head to the beach, where Gaara defeats Ranke and Kamina flees, while Shikamaru and Sakura save Kahiko from Fugai. Temujin recalls his past memory, before Shikamaru restrains him and reunites with the others. They interrogate Temujin, but he and Kahiko leave the caravan. At the Gelel Mine, Naruto and friends confront Haido for sacrificing anyone.

As Haido and Naruto pursue Kahiko and Temujin below the platform elevator, Shikamaru, Sakura, and Kankuro defeat Kamina and Fugai. At the Chamber of Sealing, Haido informs Temujin that he killed his parents. After destroying Temujin's stone, Haido tries to use his power of the real one to kill him, but the sacrificing soldiers arrive to save the repentant Temujin. Naruto uses the green and orange Rasengan (螺旋丸, lit. spiral sphere, English manga: "Spiral Chakra Sphere") to destroy the stone and defeat Haido, then Naruto, Temujin, and Kahiko discover the mine losing control. Temujin uses the Space-Time Hole to destroy the mine and Naruto saves him.

In the mid-credits scene, the recovered Temujin and the children set sail, and say goodbye to Naruto and allies.

== Cast ==
Role	Japanese voice actor	American voice actor
Naruto Uzumaki	Junko Takeuchi	Maile Flanagan
Sakura Haruno	Chie Nakamura	Kate Higgins
Shikamaru Nara	Showtaro Morikubo	Tom Gibis
Gaara	Akira Ishida	Liam O'Brien
Kankuro	Yasuyuki Kase	Michael Lindsay
Haido	Akio Nojima	Douglas Rye
Temujin	Gamon Kaai; Yūko Katō	Roger Craig Smith
Fugai	Urara Takano	Kari Wahlgren
Kamira	Sachiko Kojima	Jennifer Hale
Ranke	Houko Kuwashima	Megan Hollingshead
Emina	Tomoka Kurokawa	Michelle Ruff
Kahiko	Nachi Nozawa	Kyle Hebert
