= Jiraiya (Naruto) =

Fictional character from Naruto

- Naruto character
- Jiraiya as he is drawn by Masashi Kishimoto
- First appearance: Naruto Chapter 90: Whaddabout My Training?! (2001)
- Created by: Masashi Kishimoto
- Voiced by: Japanese; Hōchū Ōtsuka; Tōru Nara (as a child); English; David Lodge; Brad MacDonald (as a child); Todd Haberkorn (Rock Lee & His Ninja Pals); Richard Cansino (Naruto: Ultimate Ninja); Wally Wingert (Naruto: Ultimate Ninja Heroes 2: The Phantom Fortress)

Jiraiya (Japanese: 自来也) is a fictional character in the Naruto manga and anime series created by Masashi Kishimoto. Introduced in the series' first part, he was a student of Third Hokage Hiruzen Sarutobi and one of the three "Legendary Three Ninjas"(Legendary Sanin)—along with Orochimaru and Lady Tsunade, his former teammates. Jiraiya appears as a perverted old man who occasionally returns to the village Konohagakure, reporting the activities of Orochimaru and the organization Akatsuki. Referred to as the "Toad Sage" and "Pervy Sage", he mentors Fourth Hokage Minato Namikaze and later becomes the godfather and mentor of Minato's son, Naruto Uzumaki.

Jiraiya appears in two Naruto films, and as a playable character in most of the franchise's video games. Various pieces of merchandise based on him have been released. He has received positive critical reception. Reviewers have praised Jiraiya's introduction in the story and his relation with Naruto as his mentor. Out of all student-teacher relationships in Naruto, Jiraiya and Naruto's is the one Kishimoto liked the most. He served as a strong father-figure to Naruto.

== Creation and conception ==
Manga author Masashi Kishimoto first conceived Jiraiya's name based on Kabuki. He conceptualized him as a wizard with frog-like traits. He gave him an incisive and energetic speech pattern specific to old Kabuki plays. Kishimoto stated that Jiraiya "makes everything more colorful" since he is one of the few characters who enjoy talking. Regarding the bonds in the story, Kishimoto highlighted the importance of the character's death during his fight against Pain; this remark was made since, in his last moments, Jiraiya manages to discover the origin of Pain's multiple bodies and uses his last forces to send a message to Naruto Uzumaki in which he explains how Pain can be defeated. Kishimoto felt he had done a good job of establishing Jiraiya's last moments. He commented that out of all the master-pupil relationships he had created in the Naruto series, the bond between Naruto and Jiraiya is his favorite, stating that drawing their interactions was "worthwhile". Jiraiya was one of the characters that resonated the most with the author alongside Naruto, Sasuke Uchiha, and Haku.

At the 2015 New York Comic-Con, when asked which character besides Naruto is his favorite, Kishimoto chose Jiraiya. Due to the fans' preference, Kishimoto drew a sketch of Jiraiya in front of the audience at the event. He stated he felt nostalgic since this was the first time he had drawn Jiraiya or any other character in the series for a while. However, Kishimoto did not remember how to draw Jiraiya initially, and thus he used a person among the spectators who was cosplaying Jiraiya as a reference. After being asked which character's point of view he would choose to tell the story from instead of Naruto's if given the possibility, Kishimoto listed Jiraiya as one of his choices. He elaborated on this by stating Jiraiya was not very knowledgeable at a young age, feeling that this aspect would have created an interesting contrast with Jiraiya's "not so much arrogant, but overconfident, blusterous, and very, very skilled" adult self and that the story presenting Jiraiya's development would have been "fun to draw". Kishimoto further mentioned that jutsu was still in the process of developing during Jiraiya's childhood, and he felt this would have been an engaging subject to depict in the series. Jiraiya is played by Hōchū Ōtsuka in the series' original animated adaptation, while David Lodge voices him in the English dub.

David Lodge stated that Jiraiya is one of viewers' "favorite characters". When questioned if he is frequently asked to voice Jiraiya in new features since the character is a part of such a popular franchise, he answered affirmatively. Lodge stated that besides being known as the "Toad Sage" due to controlling frogs, Jiraiya is also known as the "Pervy Sage", considering this a "big deal" in Japan due to such content being classified as sensitive. He stated that in the United States, a lot of the things regarding the "Pervy Sage" part had to be restricted. Lodge said that Jiraiya was the best character he had ever played due to having "so many dimensions"; he elaborated by mentioning that while Jiraiya can be "crazy", he can also be a "very serious, philosophical, wise sage". He characterized this aspect of Jiraiya's personality as "fun". He said he had "such a good time" playing Jiraiya, stating he managed to "delve into a character that is more than one-dimensional" in the process of voicing him. Lodge also stated he has "a huge fanbase" for Jiraiya's character. He commented that Jiraiya is his favorite character, characterizing him as "such a grand scope character".

== Appearances ==
=== In Naruto ===
Jiraiya is a ninja from the village of Konohagakure trained by Hiruzen Sarutobi, the Third Hokage. He becomes known as the "Toad Sage" and also "Pervy Sage" due to his training under the Great Toad Sage in the field of Senjutsu (仙術; lit. "sage techniques"), enabling him to summon toads as allies during battles. The Great Toad Sage also informs Jiraiya of a prophecy that he will mentor a child who will either save the world or destroy it. As he grows older, Jiraiya and his two teammates, Orochimaru and Tsunade, are collectively referred to as the "Legendary Sannin" owing to their exemplary ninja abilities allowing them to survive a fight against Hanzo—Amegakure's dictator—during the Second Great Ninja War. Soon after, Jiraiya encounters a trio of Amegakure orphans consisting of Nagato, Yahiko, and Konan, training the three in ninjutsu to protect themselves before returning to the Land of Fire. At that time, Jiraiya considered Nagato to be the child from the Great Toad Sage's prophecy.

For most of his adult life, though loyal to Konohagakure, Jiraiya often leaves his hometown to explore the world. Sometime later, Jiraiya becomes a mentor to Minato Namikaze, the future Fourth Hokage, who dies due to sealing the Nine-Tailed Fox inside his newborn son, Naruto Uzumaki. Jiraiya makes only sporadic appearances, returning to Konohagakure after long absences to report on information he has learned throughout his travels. During his first appearance in the series' Part I, Jiraiya takes the time to train Naruto, teaching him his own signature abilities and trying to help him learn how to control Kurama. When his teacher, Hiruzen, who has resumed his duty as the Third Hokage since Minato's death, dies during an invasion by Orochimaru, Jiraiya is offered the position of Hokage. Despite this, Jiraiya thinks his inability to prevent Orochimaru from becoming a criminal makes him unworthy of the responsibility and instead offers to search for Tsunade so that she can take the position instead—a task he eventually succeeds at. After Naruto's flawed attempt to retrieve Sasuke Uchiha, Jiraiya decides to take the boy for two and a half years of training to make him strong enough to bring Sasuke back and to protect himself from the Akatsuki organization.

In Part II, Jiraiya returns to inform Kakashi Hatake and Yamato about the threat Naruto can become under the Nine-Tails's influence by telling them of his near-death experiences when the youth used only a fraction of Kurama's power. To keep Naruto from participating in Team 7's new Sasuke-related mission, Jiraiya offers to train him again and takes Naruto to Yugakure, the Village Hidden in Boiling Water. After entrusting Naruto with the key to Kurama's seal, Jiraiya begins investigating the Akatsuki's leader, Pain. His investigation leads him to battle Pain, whom he recognizes to be Nagato using the corpses of Yahiko and five other ninja he met in his journey. At the battle's conclusion, while reflecting on his life, Jiraiya realizes that Naruto is the boy foretold in the prophecy. Due to this, remembering it was his first novel that inspired Minato to name his son after the book's protagonist, Jiraiya musters the strength to send a message about Nagato's Paths of Pain, along with a disabled Animal Path, to Naruto and the rest of Konohagakure to give them an edge. While Pain kills Jiraiya, he concludes that Naruto will be a hero.

=== In other media ===
Jiraiya makes an appearance in two Naruto films, Naruto Shippuden the Movie: Bonds (2008) and Naruto Shippuden the Movie: The Will of Fire (2009). He is a playable character in most Naruto video games, including the Clash of Ninja series, the Ultimate Ninja series, and the Path of the Ninja series. In the first Ultimate Ninja game (2003), he only appears as a support to Naruto during his special techniques. In the Path of the Ninja RPG series, he is a character who can be spoken to for information and support. In Ultimate Ninja 2 (2004), he is an available character and has been given variations of the Rasengan, fire techniques, and toads summoning techniques. In Path of the Ninja 2 (2006), he is not only a character in the storyline, but a "secret" acquirable character that can be added to the team as a fully active member.

== Reception ==
Jiraiya has appeared in several of the main Shōnen Jump popularity polls. In the second and third, he ranked in the top ten. In the fourth poll, he ranked 11th. In the last poll conducted in 2011, Jiraiya was placed 16th. Merchandise based on Jiraiya has also been released, including action figures, key chains, and headbands similar to his. Naruto's Japanese voice actress, Junko Takeuchi, was reminded of Jiraiya's close relationship with Naruto when reading the script of The Last: Naruto the Movie.

Several manga, anime, and video game reviewers have praised the character of Jiraiya. Davey Jones of ActiveAnime regarded Jiraiya's training with Naruto as good comic relief and stated that the two characters are similar. AnimeonDVD's Justin Rich praised Jiraiya's introduction in the series, describing him as a funny character. Jason Van Horn of IGN commented on Jiraiya's relationship with Naruto, writing that "they share so much in common". Matt Shingleton of DVDTimes viewed Jiraiya as "the greatest character Masashi Kishimoto [had] ever created in this series" and further said that "besides the fact he fills the comical pervert archetype [he is] one of the strongest characters in the series and just about everything about him is rough and unpredictable". Jason Thompson praised the character's Sage Mode, commenting that it would make a good cosplay. He also expressed shock at the character's death while fighting Pain, considering him a sympathetic person. Luke Carroll of Anime News Network enjoyed David Lodge's role as Jiraiya's English voice actor. Hiroshi Matsuyama found that Jiraiya's death had a major impact in his work as a game designer in the Naruto games due to his previous works from .hack never actually had a death in the narrative with the exception being Harold who is already dead during the .hack series.

In 2010, Shueisha published the first novel Jiraiya wrote, which was inspired by his student Nagato and prompted Minato and Kushina Uzumaki to name their son after its protagonist. The novel is titled Naruto: Tales of a Gutsy Ninja (Naruto―ナルト―ド根性忍伝, Naruto: Dokonjō Ninden) and follows the fictional character Naruto Musasabi. Naruto tries to track down his former comrade, Renge Momoashi, and unravel a mysterious conspiracy involving the destruction of a nearby village. In 2015, Shueisha released Jiraiya's second novel, Naruto: The Tale of the Utterly Purehearted Shinobi (Naruto -ナルト- ド純情忍伝, Naruto: Dojunjō Ninden), which presents a battle between two fighters who appear to be related.
