= Shikamaru Nara =

Fictional character from Naruto

- Naruto character
- Shikamaru Nara in Part I. Art by Masashi Kishimoto
- First appearance: Naruto chapter 34: Intruders? (2000)
- Created by: Masashi Kishimoto
- Voiced by: Japanese; Showtaro Morikubo; Nobutoshi Canna (Naruto episode 141); English; Tom Gibis

In-universe information
- Family: Shikaku Nara (father, deceased); Yoshino Nara (mother)
- Spouse: Temari (wife)
- Children: Shikadai Nara (son)
- Relatives: Gaara (brother-in-law); Kankuro (brother-in-law); Rasa (father-in-law, deceased); Karura (mother-in-law, deceased); Shinki (adoptive marital-nephew); Yashamaru (uncle-in-law, deceased)
- Ninja rank: Genin in first half of Part I; Chunin in second half of Part I and all of Part II; Jonin in Epilogue; Hokage's Chief Aide in Boruto (Part I); Eighth Hokage in Boruto (Part II)
- Ninja team: Team 10

Shikamaru Nara (Japanese: 奈良 シカマル, Hepburn: Nara Shikamaru) is a fictional character in the manga and anime franchise, Naruto, created by Masashi Kishimoto. In the manga, Shikamaru is a shinobi affiliated with the Village Hidden in the Leaves or Konohagakure. He is a member of Team 10, a group of ninja consisting of himself, Choji Akimichi, Ino Yamanaka, and team leader Asuma Sarutobi. Shikamaru is portrayed as a lazy character, unwilling to apply his prodigious intelligence. Kishimoto has noted that he likes Shikamaru due to his easygoing nature. Outside the Naruto anime and manga, Shikamaru has appeared in several other media in the franchise, including video games, original video animations, and six feature films.

Numerous anime and manga publications have commented on Shikamaru's character. Many reviewers commented on his laziness and intelligence, and noted his transformation into a leader; Anime News Network celebrated Shikamaru's emergence in the Naruto storyline. Shikamaru has also been highly popular with the Naruto reader base, placing high in several popularity polls. Merchandise based on Shikamaru has been released, including action figures, key chains, and patches.

== Creation and conception ==
Shikamaru Nara is known for being one of the smartest characters in the anime manga series Naruto. Masashi Kishimoto originally created Shikamaru in order for him to be the only winner of an early Naruto arc: the Chunin Exams, based on his high intelligence. However, recommendations from his editors resulted in Kishimoto deciding to interrupt the fighting tournament between the ninjas in order to focus on a recently introduced villain, Orochimaru. Nevertheless, Shikamaru ends up becoming the only ninja from the original test to achieve Chunin rank during Part I of the series.

Kishimoto has noted that he likes Shikamaru due to his easygoing nature despite being a genius, and contrasted him against Sasuke Uchiha's intelligent but abrasive personality. Kishimoto also comically remarked that he would marry Shikamaru if he were a female, noting that Shikamaru would likely be successful in life. When designing Shikamaru's Part II appearance, Kishimoto wanted to give Shikamaru a unique appearance despite drawing him with a vest that several other ninja wear in the series. As a result, he drew his forehead protector on his arm in order to not obscure his hair.

During Part II, Shikamaru's teacher, Asuma Sarutobi, dies from Hidan, an Akatsuki member, and Shikamaru starts smoking Asuma's cigars. Kishimoto feared that Shueisha would censor this since Shikamaru was still a teenager and the manga's magazine was aimed at young demographic. Although, these scenes were not censored in the manga, these scenes were ultimately censored in the anime, only depicting Shikamaru holding Asuma's silver lighter.

== Appearances ==
The Nara Clan symbol

=== In Naruto ===
Shikamaru's first major appearance in the series is during the Chunin Exams; held twice a year, Genin take part in them to advance their ranks. He is part of Team 10 alongside Choji Akimichi and Ino Yamanaka. He is a highly unenthusiastic person, and he attempts to go through life with minimum effort. Contrary to his lazy tendencies, Shikamaru is extremely intelligent; his teacher, Asuma Sarutobi, determined that Shikamaru's IQ was over 200. Shikamaru's abilities are based on the Shadow Imitation Technique (影真似の術, Kagemane no Jutsu; English TV: "Shadow Possession Jutsu"), the signature technique of his clan, with which he merges his shadow with an opponent's shadow, making them immobilized and forced to mimic Shikamaru's movements. As the series progresses, Shikamaru becomes able to manipulate his shadow in new ways. By Part II of the series, Shikamaru is capable of utilizing multiple shadow-based techniques at once and can lift his shadow from the ground in order to interact with physical objects; for instance, he can pierce enemies with the shadow tendrils or use them to throw weapons.

Shikamaru approaches the exams with a sense of apathy. When he battles Temari, a shinobi from the Village Hidden in the Sand or Sunagakure, he defeats her but forfeits his match to her, due to his chakra being low. Despite this loss, he is the only ninja among his peers to be promoted to the rank of Chunin, as Tsunade, the fifth Hokage, was impressed by the insight and intelligence he demonstrated during Orochimaru's invasion of the Leaf village. As a Chunin, Shikamaru is appointed the leader of a team to prevent Sasuke Uchiha from defecting to the Village of Otogakure or the Hidden Sound Village. Although Shikamaru's team manages to defeat the Sound ninjas barring their way, Sasuke manages to escape.

In Part II of the series, Shikamaru is assigned the task of locating two members of the criminal organization Akatsuki. While his team manages to find their targets, the immortal Akatsuki member Hidan kills Asuma Sarutobi during the course of the battle. After Asuma's funeral, Shikamaru sets out with the surviving members of Team 10 to avenge their mentor with the aid of Kakashi Hatake. As the others deal with Hidan's partner Kakuzu, Shikamaru avenges Asuma by defeating Hidan and making sure the Akatsuki member's body is never found. Following the fight, Shikamaru vows to protect Kurenai Yuhi and Asuma's newborn daughter. After the Akatsuki formally declared war on all the Hidden Villages, therefore starting the Fourth Great Ninja War, Shikamaru is later assigned to the Fourth Division alongside Temari and Choji. He is named a proxy general under Gaara. In the series epilogue, stating his personal desire during the series of final battles, Shikamaru becomes advisor to the Seventh Hokage Naruto Uzumaki after marrying Temari and gaining a son in Shikadai Nara. During Part 2 of Boruto, following Naruto's disappearance and presumed murder, for which Boruto was framed, Shikamaru serves de facto as the Eighth Hokage, without however having been officially inaugurated.

=== Appearances in other media ===
Besides the Naruto anime and manga, Shikamaru is featured in seven of the featured films in the series: in the second film, he aids Naruto Uzumaki and Sakura Haruno in fighting against Haido, a utopian idealist seeking to rule the world with a power called Gelel; in the fourth, Shikamaru appears in a brief sequence, fighting against a large group of stone soldiers; in the fifth, Shikamaru is sent alongside Kakashi and Sai in search of the base of the Land of Sky, who plans to invade Konoha; in the sixth, Shikamaru, alongside Sakura and Sai, battles the chimera beast summoned by Hiruko; in the eight, Shikamaru participates in the battle against the demon Satori; in the ninth, the Limited Tsukuyomi universe presents a portly Shikamaru, the exact opposite of his teammate, Choji, who becomes the team strategist instead; and in the tenth, Shikamaru leads the team consisting of himself, Naruto, Sakura, Sai, and Hinata Hyuga that is sent to rescue Hinata's younger sister, Hanabi, who was kidnapped by Toneri Otsutsuki. He is also present in the third original video animation, in which he participates in a tournament. Shikamaru is a playable character in nearly all Naruto video games, including the Clash of Ninja series and the Ultimate Ninja series. In some games, he utilizes variations of his Shadow Imitation Technique not seen in the anime or manga. Ultimate Ninja 4 and Gekitō Ninja Taisen! EX 2 marks the first appearance of Shikamaru in his Part II appearance in a video game.

A light novel titled Shikamaru Hiden: A Cloud Drifting in Silent Darkness, written by Takashi Yano and illustrated by Kishimoto, stars Shikamaru as the main character and narrator. The novel is set two years after the Fourth Ninja War, focusing on Shikamaru's assignment as organizer of the newly formed Shinobi Union to capture a rogue ninja who rules over the distant Land of Silence and attempts to establish a new world order ruled by the common people. It also explores his growing relationship with Temari, culminating in him struggling to name his child with her, years after the end of the novel. An upcoming novel by Mirei Miyamoto will focus on Shikamaru's life as a father.

== Reception ==
Shikamaru has ranked highly in the Weekly Shōnen Jump popularity polls for the series, continuously placing in the top ten and reaching fourth place in one poll. The last such poll was in 2011, in which Shikamaru was in ninth place, behind Sasori and ahead of Hinata. Merchandise based on Shikamaru has also been released, including action figures, key chains, and patches in both his Part I and Part II appearance. NTT customers voted him as their sixteenth favorite black haired male anime character. CyberConnect2 CEO Hiroshi Matsuyama referred to Shikamaru as one of his favorite characters from Naruto.

Several publications for manga, anime, video games, and other related media have commented on Shikamaru's character. IGN stated that Shikamaru was one of their favorite characters in the series, and referred to him as "the poster child for any card-carrying member of Generation X" due to his general lack of enthusiasm and his unwillingness to utilize his potential. In a review of episode 110, IGN praised how Shikamaru managed to transcend his lazy nature in order to take on the mantle of a leader when assigned to lead a team in order to retrieve Sasuke Uchiha and agreed that the decision to make him Chunin was fair. Anime News Network also commented on this development, calling Shikamaru's emergence as "an unlikely hero" one of the highlights of the arc. In a subsequent review of episode 135, in which the mission to retrieve Sasuke has failed and the members of Shikamaru's team were critically injured, IGN lauded the "great moment" in the episode in which Shikamaru began to cry after learning his friends will recover, and declared that he will be a better leader for the sake of his friends. Mania Entertainment's Justin Rich celebrated his "sheer intellect", calling him "one of the most fascinating characters in the series" and "one of the few truly brilliant fighters in shōnen anime". Dani Moure, another reviewer from the same site, noted about his battle with Temari during the Chunin Exams that it was "one of the better fights involving the supporting players".

Javier Lugo from Manga Life found Shikamaru's fight in the series' fourteenth volume good despite how threatening it is for him. For Part II, Park Cooper from the same site acclaimed Shikamaru's strategy in dealing with the members from the series' antagonist, Akatsuki. Amy McNulty from Anime News Network praised how Shikamaru's epilogue episodes helps to expand his characterization as he decides to aid Naruto when he becomes the Hokage. Reviewing the anime Boruto: Naruto Next Generations's third episode, Sam Stewart from IGN enjoyed the adult Shikamaru's characterization for how he helps his sons Shikadai but ultimately felt he was overshadowed by his wife Temari.
