= The Tale of the Princess Kaguya =

The Tale of the Princess Kaguya may refer to:

- The Tale of the Bamboo Cutter, a 9th or 10th century Japanese story
- The Tale of the Princess Kaguya (film), a 2013 film based on the story
- Princess Kaguya, a 1935 film based on the story

== See also ==
- Kaguya
