= Kaguya =

Kaguya may refer to:

- Kaguya (mouse), an artificially bred mouse
- Kaguya (wrestler), Japanese professional wrestler
- "Kaguya" (song), a 2015 single by Japanese boy band News
- "Kaguya", a 2024 single by @onefive
- Kaguya, the nickname for the Japanese lunar orbit spacecraft SELENE, launched in 2007
- 10880 Kaguya, a minor planet named after the spacecraft

== Fiction ==
=== Kaguya-hime ===
- Kaguya-hime (かぐや姫, "Princess Kaguya"), the main character in The Tale of the Bamboo Cutter, thought to be the oldest Japanese folktale
  - Princess Kaguya, a 1935 film based on the folktale
  - The Tale of the Princess Kaguya (film), a 2013 Studio Ghibli animated film based on the folktale
  - Kaguyahime (manga), a manga series by Reiko Shimizu based on the folktale
  - Prince Kaguya, a musical based on the folktale
  - Cosmic Princess Kaguya!, a 2026 Japanese musical anime film based on the folktale

=== Other fictional characters and elements ===
- Kaguya Houraisan, in Imperishable Night from the Touhou Project video game series
- Kaguya Ōtsutsuki, in the anime and manga series Naruto
- Kaguya Shinomiya, in the manga series Kaguya-sama: Love Is War
- Kaguya Sumeragi, in the anime series Code Geass
- Kimimaro Kaguya, in the anime and manga series Naruto
- Princess Snow Kaguya, in the anime film Sailor Moon S: The Movie
