= List of Naruto characters =

The major characters of the series as they appear in Part I, as seen from left to right: Lee, Guy, Gaara, Hinata, Sakura, Kakashi, Naruto, Iruka, Sasuke, Itachi, Shikamaru, Shino, and Neji.

The major characters of the series as they appear in Part II with Kurama (The Nine-Tailed Fox) in the background

The Naruto (Japanese: ナルト) manga and anime series features an extensive cast of characters created by Masashi Kishimoto. The series takes place in a fictional universe where countries vie for power by employing ninja who can use special techniques and abilities in combat. The storyline is divided into two parts, simply named Part I and Part II, with the latter taking place two-and-a-half years after the conclusion of Part I. It is followed by the sequel series Boruto by Ukyō Kodachi, which continues where the epilogue of the first series left off. The series' storyline follows the adventures of a group of young ninja from the village of Konohagakure (Village Hidden in the Leaves).

The eponymous character of the first series is Naruto Uzumaki, an energetic ninja who wishes to become Hokage, the leader of Konohagakure and holds a demon fox called Nine-Tails sealed in his body. During the early part of the series, Naruto is assigned to Team 7, in which he meets his long-time rival/friend Sasuke Uchiha, a taciturn and highly skilled "genius" of the Uchiha clan; and Sakura Haruno, who is infatuated with Sasuke and has Naruto's attention and Kakashi Hatake, the quiet and mysterious leader of the team. Over the course of the series, seeking out Sasuke when he ran away from the village, Naruto interacts with and befriends several fellow ninja in Konohagakure and other villages. He also encounters the series' antagonists, including Orochimaru, a rogue ninja of Konohagakure scheming to destroy his former home, as well as the elite rogue ninja of the criminal organization Akatsuki who seek out Jinchuriki like Naruto and Gaara for the Tailed Beasts.

As Kishimoto developed the series, he created the three primary characters as a basis for the designs of the other three-person teams. He also used characters in other shōnen manga as references in his design of the characters, a decision that was criticized by several anime and manga publications. The characters that Kishimoto developed, however, were praised for incorporating many of the better aspects of previous shōnen characters, although many publications lamented the perceived lack of growth beyond such stereotypes. The visual presentation of the characters was commented on by reviewers, with both praise and criticism given to Kishimoto's work in the manga and anime adaptations.

The English manga published by VIZ Media uses the Japanese naming order, surname before given name, while other English adaptations use the Western order, that is surname after given name.

== Creation and conception ==
When Masashi Kishimoto was originally creating the Naruto series, he looked to other shōnen manga for inspiration while still attempting to make his characters as unique as possible. Kishimoto cites Akira Toriyama's Dragon Ball series as one of these influences, noting that Goku, the protagonist of Dragon Ball, was a key factor when creating Naruto Uzumaki due to his energetic and mischievous personality. To complement Naruto, Kishimoto worked on creating a rival that was a "cool genius", as he believed this was "the archetypal rival character". After reviewing different manga for ideas, he ultimately developed Sasuke Uchiha. When creating the primary heroine, Kishimoto admitted, "I don't have a definite image of what a heroine should be". He eventually created Sakura Haruno, emphasizing "her energy and flirtatious spirit" as her primary characteristics. These three characters would be the mold for the other three main Naruto teams.

The separation of the characters into different teams was intended to give each group a specific flavor. Kishimoto wished for each team member to be "extreme", having a high amount of aptitude in one given attribute, yet talentless in another. This approach was used to make each team perform best when individual members worked together to overcome their weaknesses. Having watched tokusatsu dramas as a child, Kishimoto wished for his teams to be different from the superhero teams in these dramas, dismissing the value of a team in which all the teammates were "strong to the point of perfection". Kishimoto notes that the different roles the characters assume is similar to many role-playing games, and "each character stands out better that way".

Kishimoto inserted villains into the story to counteract the lead characters' moral values. He stated that this focus on illustrating the difference in values is central to his creation of villains to the point that, "I don't really think about them in combat". The villains' physical appearances were also embellished to differentiate them from other characters, making it easier for a reader to follow the story and identify the villains, even in heated battle scenes. Kishimoto noted that making the villains "flamboyant" with a "showy costume" is "one of my guiding principles", as well as making them "more memorable".

When drawing the characters, Kishimoto consistently follows a five-step process: concept and rough sketch, drafting, inking, shading, and coloring. These steps are followed when he is drawing the manga and making the color illustrations that commonly adorn the cover of tankōbon, the cover of the Weekly Shōnen Jump, or other media, but the toolkit he uses occasionally changes. For instance, he used an airbrush for one illustration for a Weekly Shōnen Jump cover, but decided not to use it for future drawings largely due to the cleanup required.

== Main characters ==
=== Naruto ===
The protagonists of the Naruto series are Naruto Uzumaki, Sasuke Uchiha, Sakura Haruno, and Kakashi Hatake, who form "Team 7" (第7班, Dainanahan) of Konohagakure. After Sasuke Uchiha's defection and Naruto's departure from Konohagakure at the end of Part I, the team disbands. During Part II, the team reforms as "Team Kakashi" (カカシ班, Kakashi-Han) with two new members: Sai, who occupies Sasuke's position, and Yamato, who becomes the acting Captain.^{[ch. 285]} During the Fourth Great Ninja War, Team 7 reunites to fight Madara Uchiha and then Kaguya Ōtsutsuki when she possesses the former. Once the War is over, Naruto and Sasuke have their final battle that allow them to resolve their issues with their group fully reunited soon after.

==== Naruto Uzumaki ====
Naruto Uzumaki (うずまき ナルト, Uzumaki Naruto) is the titular character and main protagonist of the Naruto franchise. He was the first character created by Kishimoto during the conception of the series and was designed with many traits from other shōnen characters. He is often shunned by the Konohagakure villagers as he is the host of Kurama, the Nine-Tailed Fox that attacked Konoha.^{[ch. 2]} After being held back for several years in the Ninja Academy, which teaches ninjutsu and taijutsu skills, he finally passes the Ninja certification exam, and compensates for this with his cheerful and boisterous personality as he developed his catchphrase "Believe it!" (～だってばよ, dattebayo), vowing to never give up on any goal he sets. In particular, Naruto has ambitions of becoming Hokage, the strongest ninja leader of Konohagakure, to gain the villagers's respect and be able to protect them. Over the course of the series, Naruto befriends many foreign and Konoha people and eventually leaves a positive influence on all their lives, which grants him worldwide fame.^{[ch.. 450]} Naruto eventually achieves his dream of becoming Seventh Hokage, marries Hinata Hyuga and has two children: Boruto Uzumaki and Himawari Uzumaki.^{[ch.. 700]} Naruto is voiced by Junko Takeuchi in Japanese, and by Maile Flanagan in English.

==== Sasuke Uchiha ====
Sasuke Uchiha (うちは サスケ, Uchiha Sasuke) is Naruto Uzumaki's main rival and best friend. He was designed by Kishimoto as a "cool genius" since he felt this was an integral part of an ideal rivalry. Sasuke's older brother, Itachi Uchiha, killed the rest of their clan.^{[ch. 224]} Because of this, Sasuke's sole ambition is to avenge his clan and kill his brother, developing a cold and withdrawn personality and self-proclaiming Avenger, seeing people as tools to further his goal. By the events of the Boruto series, Sasuke has become a vigilante investigating the Ōtsutsuki clan for Konohagakure and a mentor for Naruto's son, Boruto Uzumaki. Sasuke is voiced by Noriaki Sugiyama in the Japanese anime, while his English voice actor is Yuri Lowenthal.

==== Sakura Haruno ====
Sakura Haruno (春野 サクラ, Haruno Sakura) is a member of Team 7, Naruto's classmate and Sasuke's love interest. While creating the character, Kishimoto has admitted that he had little perception of what an ideal girl should be like. As a child, Sakura was teased by other children because of her large forehead, a feature Kishimoto tried to emphasize in Sakura's appearance. She was comforted by Ino Yamanaka and the two developed a friendship. In the Japanese anime, her voice actress is Chie Nakamura, and she is voiced by Kate Higgins in the English adaptation.

==== Kakashi Hatake ====
Kakashi Hatake (はたけ カカシ, Hatake Kakashi) is the easygoing, tardy, smart leader of Team 7, consisting of Naruto Uzumaki, Sasuke Uchiha and Sakura Haruno. Kakashi had a dark past by suffering many significant losses which included Sakumo Hatake, his father who had committed suicide, Minato Namikaze, his mentor who sacrificed himself, Rin Nohara, who Kakashi accidentally killed, and Obito, who died during a rescue mission, although it was later revealed that he was still alive. Kakashi was a very vital key for Naruto's success, training him to be a great ninja. Kakashi succeeds Tsunade as the Sixth Hokage after the Fourth Great Ninja War has ended, with Naruto succeeding him as the Seventh Hokage years later. He is voiced by Kazuhiko Inoue in the Japanese anime, and by Dave Wittenberg in English.

=== Naruto Shippūden ===
==== Sai ====
Sai (サイ) is a ninja who joins Team Kakashi in Part II, carefully designed by Kishimoto to stand out as Sasuke's replacement by having the two look similar. A member of "The Foundation" since he was a child, Sai has been trained to not possess or desire any type of emotion or camaraderie, even after he killed his surrogate brother Shin under Danzo's diabolical orders. He consequently gives people labels based on their status, and his label of Sasuke as a traitor antagonizes Naruto and Sakura. After the two discover his past and warm up to him, however, he begins to crave bonds with other people, which becomes his primary goal in the series.^{[ch. 303]} Sai's attempts to form bonds can be humorous as he tries giving pet names to others; however, he often says what he actually thinks of a person, resulting with him choosing names such as "fatso" for Choji and "ugly" for Sakura. He eventually learns from his mistakes and attempts the opposite approach by calling Ino "beautiful", causing Ino to fall for him.^{[ch. 312]} When not making an attempt to bond with others, Sai spends his time painting and drawing, and has produced thousands of works, although he doesn't name any of them. His artistic talents extend to his choice of attacks in battles, as he can infuse chakra with his inking brush to make his drawings come to life.^{[ch. 283]} In the series epilogue, Sai ends up marrying Ino Yamanaka and together they have a son, Inojin.^{[ch. 700]} Of all the Naruto protagonists, Sai receives the least screen time (since New Era) in the series. Sai's voice actor is Satoshi Hino in the Naruto: Shippūden anime, and his English voice actor is Benjamin Diskin except in Rock Lee and his Ninja Pals, where he is voiced by Lucien Dodge.

==== Yamato ====
Yamato (ヤマト) is introduced during Part II of the Naruto series as an ANBU member who becomes a substitute captain in Team Kakashi.^{[ch. 284]} "Yamato" is not his real name, rather a codename assigned for the purposes of joining Team Kakashi.^{[ch. 317]} Unlike Kakashi, who was his senior in the ANBU and referred to him as Tenzo (テンゾウ, Tenzō), Yamato believes ninja should be able to look after themselves to the point of leaving behind any he sees as a hindrance.^{[ch. 298]} During his childhood, Yamato was abducted by Orochimaru and experimented upon in an attempt to replicate the First Hokage's Wood Style jutsu. In the anime, the ordeal erased Yamato's memories as he was taken in by Danzo to serve as a Root operative under the code name Kinoe (甲). After meeting Kakashi, Kinoe would leave Root and join the Anbu as Tenzo.

After Kakashi Hatake was wounded during his team's mission to rescue Gaara from the Akatsuki, Tsunade places Yamato in Team Kakashi under the cover of acting leader so he can use his Wood Style whenever the need to suppress Kurama's influence over Naruto arises.^{[ch. 291]} For possessing the First Hokage's DNA, Yamato gets captured by Kabuto to strengthen the White Zetsu army for the Fourth Great Ninja War. Yamato is eventually revealed to have been contained by the body of the White Zetsu known as Guruguru, until the altered human ejects him once Madara casts the Infinite Tsukiyomi.^{[ch. 676]} In Naruto: The Seventh Hokage and the Scarlet Spring, Yamato is among the ninja assigned to keep tabs on Orochimaru. In the anime, Yamato is voiced by Rikiya Koyama in the Japanese version. In the English version, he was voiced by Troy Baker, with Matthew Mercer taking over the role since Episode 230; however, Baker reprises the role in Naruto Shippuden: Ultimate Ninja Storm 4.

=== Boruto ===
The protagonists of the Boruto series are Naruto and Hinata's son Boruto Uzumaki, Sasuke and Sakura's daughter Sarada Uchiha, Orochimaru's artificial son Mitsuki, and Konohamaru Sarutobi who form "Team Konohamaru" (木ノ葉丸班, Konohamaru-Han). Prior to their series, Konohamaru was a supporting character in the Naruto series while Boruto and Sarada were introduced in the Naruto epilogue.^{[ch. 700]}

==== Boruto Uzumaki ====
Boruto Uzumaki (うずまき ボルト, Uzumaki Boruto) is the titular character and main protagonist of the Boruto franchise, he is son of Naruto Uzumaki and Hinata Hyuga and the older brother of Himawari Uzumaki. who attends Konoha's ninja academy, inheriting his paternal family's short blond hair, blue eyes, including his father and his grandmother's "Believe it!" (だってばさ, dattebasa) verbal tic. In the Japanese version, Boruto is voiced by Kokoro Kikuchi in The Last: Naruto the Movie and by Yuuko Sanpei in all subsequent appearances. In the English version, he is voiced by Maile Flanagan in The Last and by Amanda C. Miller in all subsequent appearances.

==== Sarada Uchiha ====
Sarada Uchiha (うちは サラダ, Uchiha Sarada) is the daughter of Sasuke Uchiha and Sakura Haruno. She seems to have inherited traits from both her parents, like her mother's "Cha!" (しゃーんなろー!, Shānnarō!) verbal tic and her father's aloofness and reluctance to acknowledge and commend others. Sarada is the central character of Naruto: The Seventh Hokage and the Scarlet Spring, searching for her estranged father while mistakenly feeling she and Sakura are not related. Gaining her Sharingan in the process, Sarada is voiced by Kokoro Kikuchi in Japanese, while in the English version she is voiced by Laura Bailey in Naruto Shippuden: Ultimate Ninja Storm 4 and by Cherami Leigh in all subsequent appearances.

==== Mitsuki ====
Mitsuki (ミツキ) is a teammate of Boruto and Sarada, a mysterious boy with a calm mind and a penchant for making snide remarks. His backstory is explored in Naruto Gaiden: The Road Illuminated by the Full Moon, which reveals that Mitsuki is an artificial human created by Orochimaru, and a modified clone of him, gaining the name Mitsuki from the fact that he is a "vessel" (杯, tsuki) for the "snake" (巳, mi) to inhabit. He tested by Orochimaru and another of his creations called Log (ログ, Rogu) to determine his allegiance; Mitsuki decided to follow his own path as the "moon" instead of a vessel, setting out toward the Hidden Leaf to find his "sun": Boruto Uzumaki. Mitsuki can extend his limbs by using chakra to dislocate his joints, while the experimentation by Orochimaru allows him to access Sage Mode. He is voiced by Ryūichi Kijima in Japanese and by Robbie Daymond in the English dub.

==== Konohamaru Sarutobi ====
Konohamaru Sarutobi (猿飛 木ノ葉丸, Sarutobi Konohamaru), named after Konohagakure, is the grandson of the Third Hokage Hiruzen Sarutobi. He strives to replace his grandfather as Hokage so the villagers will recognize him by name, not simply as the Hokage's grandson. He looks to Naruto as a mentor in this quest, emulating his work ethic, determination, and signature jutsu such as the Rasengan and the Sexy Jutsu. Konohamaru insists, however, that he will only become Hokage after Naruto has been Hokage first.^{[ch. 2]} By the series epilogue, Konohamaru has ascended to the rank of jonin and is the captain of Team Konohamaru. Konohamaru's design caused great difficulties for Masashi Kishimoto; he intended for Konohamaru to look like a "punk" smaller than Naruto, yet all of his attempts resulted in a recreation of Naruto. He eventually gave Konohamaru small, angry-looking eyes and was instantly happy with the design.^{[vol. 2:26]} While voiced in the Japanese anime by Ikue Ōtani and by Akiko Koike as a stand-in, Konohamaru's adult self is voiced by Hidenori Takahashi. In the English version, Colleen O'Shaughnessey voices Konohamaru's pre-adult self, and Max Mittelman voices his adult self

==== Kawaki Uzumaki ====
Kawaki Uzumaki (うずまきカワキ, Uzumaki Kawaki) is a tattooed youth who became a member of Kara after being brought by Jigen from a drunkard father, bearing a tattoo of the Roman numeral IX under his left eye and bestowed a Karma Mark by Jigen to be made into a living weapon for Kara. He was heavily modified with microscopic Shinobi-Ware implanted in his body that give him abilities similar to Orochimaru's Curse Marks and Jugo's Sage Transformation in altering his physiology at a cellular level. For reasons yet to be revealed, Kawaki left Kara and encountered Boruto who brings him to the Hidden Leaf as he lives with the Uzumaki family. The two would end up becoming mortal enemies as hinted in prologue of the Boruto series; an older Kawaki appearing to have perpetrated Konoha's destruction as he confronts an older Boruto while declaring "the age of shinobi has come to an end" before begin the fight. His voice actor in the Japanese anime is Yūma Uchida and Michael Schwalbe voices him in the English dub.

== Secondary characters ==
=== Team 8 ===
Team 8 (第8班, Daihappan) is a group of Konohagakure ninja led by Kurenai Yuhi. The members of Team 8 primarily concentrate on tracking, with each of the members' unique abilities used in this role. During Part II, Team 8, excluding Kurenai due to her pregnancy, joins Naruto Uzumaki and Team 7 in their search for Itachi and Sasuke Uchiha.^{[ch. 354]}

==== Hinata Hyuga ====
Hinata Hyuga (日向 ヒナタ, Hyūga Hinata) is a member of Team 8, Sakura and Ino's best friend and Naruto's love interest. She suffers from a serious lack of self-confidence. Though born of the Hyuga clan's main house and raised to become future head of the clan, Hinata's shyness and inability to stand up for herself resulted in the strong disapproval of her father Hiashi after being defeated by her younger sister Hanabi, who became their father's successor. Hinata was then disowned by Hiashi and placed in the care of Kurenai Yuhi.^{[ch. 78]} Under Kurenai's guidance, Hinata began training her strength in both skill and will in order to prove her worth to her father.^{[ch. 238]} Hinata's growing self-confidence mainly comes from her long-standing admiration for Naruto Uzumaki, as she is inspired by his enthusiasm and unyielding determination to never give up. As the series progresses, Hinata's admiration towards Naruto eventually grows into true love. During Part II, Hinata confesses her romantic feelings to Naruto while protecting him from Pain and later assists him during the Allied Ninjas' battle with the Ten-Tails.^{[ch. 437, 615]} Following the end of the Fourth Great Ninja War, and the events of The Last: Naruto the Movie where she carries out the will of her ancestor Hamura Ōtsutsuki by helping Naruto stop Toneri, she marries him and they have two children by the series epilogue. Her voice actress in the Japanese anime is Nana Mizuki, and her English voice actress is Stephanie Sheh.

==== Kiba Inuzuka ====
Kiba Inuzuka (犬塚 キバ, Inuzuka Kiba) is a member of Team 8 from the Inuzuka Clan, a group of ninja with canine characteristics who train alongside their ninja dog (忍犬, ninken) partners. In stark contrast to his teammates, Kiba is brash, impulsive, and loud-mouthed, and considers Naruto a rival after Naruto defeats him in the Chunin Exams. Despite this, he is very protective of his teammates, and displays the same loyalty to Akamaru, unwilling to abandon him and putting himself in harm's way for Akamaru's sake.^{[ch. 204]} In exchange for Kiba's devotion, Akamaru fights with him in battle; he uses his heightened senses to Kiba's advantage, and helps double-team opponents with volleys of physical attacks. Since Akamaru is naturally better equipped for combat, Kiba usually modifies his own abilities at the start of a battle, growing claws and running on four limbs to increase his speed.^{[ch. 75]} He can also drastically increase his sense of smell, and by the second half of the series he can use it to track things dogs cannot.^{[ch. 364]} In the series epilogue, Kiba ends up living with Tamaki, the granddaughter of the Uchiha Clan's supporter Granny Cat, and the two house various dogs and cats. Kiba's voice actor in the Japanese anime is Kōsuke Toriumi, and his English voice actor is Kyle Hebert.

==== Akamaru ====
Akamaru (赤丸) is Kiba Inuzuka's ninja dog, best friend, and constant companion. At the start of the series, Kiba carries Akamaru around on his head or inside his jacket. By Part II of the Naruto storyline, Akamaru grows large enough for Kiba to ride atop his back, though Kiba comically fails to notice this drastic difference.^{[ch. 282]} With his heightened sense of smell, hearing, and ability to detect others' chakra levels, Akamaru acts as a valuable tool for Kiba in hostile situations. To help Kiba beat track of opponents, Akamaru uses scent marking, though in battle he relies on Kiba to provide the chakra for the combination attacks they execute, which require Akamaru to transform into a clone of Kiba.^{[ch. 203]} In the series epilogue, an aged Akamaru fathers a litter of puppies, among the assortment of animals living with Kiba and Tamaki. In the Japanese version of the anime, Akamaru is voiced by Junko Takeuchi, also the voice actor for Naruto Uzumaki, and Kōsuke Toriumi, who voices Kiba, when Akamaru transforms into a clone of Kiba. In the English adaptation of the anime, Akamaru's vocal effects as a puppy are provided by Jamie Simone though Kyle Hebert provided the voice of Akamaru when he took Kiba's form.

==== Shino Aburame ====
Shino Aburame (油女 シノ, Aburame Shino) is a member of Team 8 from the Aburame Clan, a group of ninja who formed a symbiosis with a special breed of insects known as "destruction bugs" (寄壊蟲, kikaichū) by allowing the insects to use their bodies as hives. During a battle, Shino directs his bugs towards an opponent, boxing them in and absorbing their chakra once they have been surrounded. Shino's merciless tendencies towards opponents, as well as his attachment to and collection of insects,^{[ch. 172]} have caused other characters to label him as "creepy".^{[ch. 70]} Nevertheless, Shino cares deeply for his teammates, being acutely aware of their inner workings and always regretting when he is unable to help them;^{[ch. 238]} he is also capable of childish emotions, as shown in the anime when he sulks after Naruto (returning after two and a half years) fails to remember his name or recognize him. In the series epilogue, Shino becomes a Ninja Academy teacher. In the Japanese anime, his voice actor is Shinji Kawada. His first voice actor in the English anime was Sam Riegel, who voiced Shino in episodes 23 and 24, but in all following appearances, he has been voiced by Derek Stephen Prince.

==== Kurenai Yuhi ====
Kurenai Yuhi (夕日 紅, Yūhi Kurenai) is the leader of Team 8, a skilled user of genjutsu, particularly skilled with illusions involving plants.^{[ch. 141]} Of all her students, Kurenai is closest with Hinata, acting as a surrogate parent in the absence of Hinata's father, and helping Hinata overcome her weaknesses.^{[ch. 78]} Whenever Kurenai appears in the series, she is usually accompanied by her childhood friend Asuma Sarutobi, and during Part II of the series, Kurenai is revealed to be pregnant with Asuma's child.^{[ch. 342]} Several months after Asuma's death, Kurenai gave birth to their daughter Mirai Sarutobi, who later becomes a kunoichi by the events of the series epilogue.^{[ch. 533, 700]} In the Japanese anime, her voice actress is Rumi Ochiai. In the English adaptation of the anime, she was voiced by Saffron Henderson in episode three, and Mary Elizabeth McGlynn in all subsequent appearances.

=== Team 10 ===
Team 10 (第10班, Daijippan) is a group of Konohagakure ninja led by Asuma Sarutobi. The fathers of the three team members Choji Akimichi, Shikamaru Nara, and Ino Yamanaka were also on a team together, and both generations refer to their team using the moniker "Ino-Shika-Cho".^{[ch. 137]} During Part II, Asuma is slain in an encounter with members of Akatsuki, and Kakashi Hatake briefly assumes leadership of the team to hunt down those responsible for Asuma's death.^{[ch. 331]} In the series epilogue, the three living members of Team Asuma are training their children to become the next "Ino-Shika-Cho" group.

==== Shikamaru Nara ====
Shikamaru Nara (奈良 シカマル, Nara Shikamaru) is a member of Team 10, Naruto's friend and Temari's love interest. Creator Kishimoto has noted that he "likes" Shikamaru due to his easygoing nature despite being a genius, and contrasted him against Sasuke Uchiha's intelligent but abrasive personality. Shikamaru's intelligence is such that Asuma Sarutobi, Team 10's leader, is never able to defeat Shikamaru at games such as shogi or go, and he can devise complex strategies even in the heat of battle. However, his laziness frequently prevents him from effectively utilizing his intelligence.^{[ch. 107]} Shikamaru is a longtime friend of Choji Akimichi, choosing to look upon Choji as a person without considering his large girth. Despite thinking of Naruto a bit poorly and often getting annoyed by him, he is one of the few people to have acknowledged him as a person rather than the tailed beast in childhood, remaining one of Naruto's close friends since then.^{[ch. 190]} In battle, Shikamaru can manipulate his shadow, and, by extending it into another person's shadow, can force the target to mimic his movements.^{[ch. 107]} In the series epilogue, Shikamaru works as Naruto's advisor and is revealed to have married Temari, who had moved to the Hidden Leaf, and with whom he has a son, Shikadai. In the Japanese anime, Shikamaru's voice actor is Showtaro Morikubo, although Nobutoshi Canna acted as a stand-in for Morikubo in episode 141. His English voice actor is Tom Gibis.

==== Choji Akimichi ====
Choji Akimichi (秋道 チョウジ, Akimichi Chōji) is a member of Team 10, typified by his affinity for food. Though his habit of always eating gives him a relatively portly appearance, Choji insists he is not fat, instead using explanations like being "big-boned". If someone refers to him as fat, Choji instantly becomes hostile and increases his resolve to battle,^{[ch. 55]} even killing one of the Sound Four during one occurrence. Shikamaru Nara has never found an issue with Choji's weight, instead choosing to look upon Choji's inner strength. Because of this, Choji regards him as his best friend, stating he would willingly give his life to defend Shikamaru.^{[ch. 190]} In battle, Choji can increase the size of his body to improve the amount of damage his strikes deal upon impact.^{[ch. 189]} He can also use his clan's signature Calorie Control (カロリーコントロール, Karorī Kontorōru) which converts his body fat to chakra.^{[ch. 190]} In the series epilogue, Choji has married Karui of the Hidden Cloud Village and they have a daughter Chocho Akimichi. His voice actor in the Japanese anime is Kentarō Itō and his English voice actor is Robbie Rist.

==== Ino Yamanaka ====
Ino Yamanaka (山中 いの, Yamanaka Ino) is a member of Team 10 and Yamanaka Clan, and the only daughter of Inoichi Yamanaka, typified by her affinity of being fashionable and good looks, making her a popular girl in the academy. She is a childhood friend of Sakura Haruno, helping her to develop her own identity and defending her from bullies. When they discovered that they both liked Sasuke Uchiha, their friendship was ended.^{[ch. 71]} The two eventually make amends and rekindle their friendship, but still maintain a competitive attitude toward each other.^{[ch. 73]} In the anime, when Sakura begins to excel in healing techniques, Ino becomes motivated to learn Medical Ninjutsu, hoping to be even more useful to her friends and teammates as an able medical ninja. In terms of combat abilities, Ino specializes in mind-altering techniques. Ino can transfer her consciousness to her target's mind, gaining control over their body and actions which she can then use to attack others, to spy or to immobilize/distract.^{[ch. 55]} She can also communicate telepathically by connecting minds of people around her, and in addition, she is a sensory ninja, able to detect chakra around her. During the death of her father, it was revealed that Ino was raised to embody the title of the 'Purple Buschlover' represented in the Yamanaka Clan's crest, which is a blunt and candid love that treasures bonds. In the series' epilogue, Ino has married Sai and they have a son, Inojin, and become the head of her clan and the Leader of the Village's Sensory Unit as well as the owner of her family's flowershop. In the Japanese anime, her voice actress is Ryōka Yuzuki, and her voice actress in the English adaptation is Colleen O'Shaughnessey.

==== Asuma Sarutobi ====
Asuma Sarutobi (猿飛 アスマ, Sarutobi Asuma) was the leader of Team 10 and son of the Third Hokage Hiruzen Sarutobi, grandson of Sasuke Sarutobi and uncle of Konohamaru Sarutobi. In battle, Asuma wielded trench knives that he could infuse with his wind nature chakra to extend the blades' length and sharpness.^{[ch. 317]} When he was younger, Asuma had a dispute with his father and briefly left Konohagakure in protest, gaining fame as a member of the Land of Fire's Twelve Guardian Shinobi. Though Asuma eventually returned, gaining the resolve to protect Konoha's next generation from his experiences outside his home, he never completely reconciled with his father by the time of Hiruzen's death.^{[ch. 314]} Asuma was usually seen smoking a cigarette, but would temporarily drop the habit when something was bothering him, such as when his father died.^{[ch. 321]} Among all his students, Asuma shared a particularly close relationship with Shikamaru Nara, often playing go or shogi together.^{[ch. 107]} Asuma frequently appears alongside his childhood friend Kurenai Yuhi, denying having a relation before it is revealed that Kurenai is bearing his child.^{[ch. 140, 342]} After Asuma is killed by Hidan of the criminal organization Akatsuki, Shikamaru inherited his mentor's ideals as he uses his knuckles to defeat Hidan. During the Fourth Great Ninja War, Asuma is brought back with the Reanimation Jutsu to fight for Kabuto before being defeated by his students and sealed until his soul is allowed to return to the afterlife. Asuma's voice actor in the Japanese anime is Jūrōta Kosugi, and he is voiced by Doug Erholtz in the English adaptation.

=== Team Guy (Team 9) ===
Team Guy (ガイ班, Gai-Han) is a group of Konohagakure ninja led by Might Guy. The members of Team Guy primarily concentrate on physical attacks and weapons. They are a year older than the other members of Konohagakure's teams, as Guy wanted to wait a year before they could take the test to advance in ninja rank and become Chunin. In Part II, Team Guy joins Team 7 in an attempt to save Gaara from the criminal organization, Akatsuki.^{[ch. 253]}

==== Rock Lee ====
Rock Lee (ロック・リー, Rokku Rī) is a member of Team Guy and the favorite student of team leader Might Guy. In the ninja academy, Rock Lee was unable to use ninjutsu or genjutsu techniques, but his persistence impressed Guy. Guy spends much of his free time training with Lee to help him accomplish his dream of becoming a respected ninja by using only taijutsu. Lee has adopted several of Guy's habits because of this, such as his wardrobe and his perseverance.^{[ch. 84]} Guy has taught him a number of powerful, even forbidden, techniques. Because some of these techniques, such as the ability to open the eight chakra gates, can pose a severe risk to Lee's body, he is only permitted to use them to protect something or someone dear to him. During the Chunin Exams, Lee loses use of both his left arm and leg, but his injuries are healed following Tsunade's return to Konoha^{[ch. 52]}. In the Japanese anime, his voice actor is Yoichi Masukawa, and his voice actor is Brian Donovan in English.

==== Neji Hyuga ====
Neji Hyuga (日向 ネジ, Hyūga Neji) was a member of Team Guy and a child prodigy of the Hyuga clan, as well as Hinata's cousin.^{[ch. 101]} As he was the only ninja of his generation to be promoted to the rank of Jonin during Part II, he frequently acted as leader of his assigned teams and the secondary leader of Team Guy when Might Guy is absent. Though a member of the branch house, Neji displayed his title as a prodigy of the Hyuga throughout the series as a master of his clan's Gentle Fist style of combat that he taught to himself.^{[ch. 101]} Originally, Neji believed in a fatalistic philosophy: that one's destiny is inescapable and that a weak person will always be weak.^{[ch. 38]}

After being defeated in the Chunin Exams Final Round by Naruto Uzumaki, who defied his own "fate" and used Nine-Tailed-Fox's chakra, Neji had a change of heart once Uncle Hiashi reveals the full story of his father's death, Hizashi Hyuga, as an act of self-sacrifice in place of his twin brother. Neji then abandons his belief in determinism and resolves to get strong enough to never lose a battle and change the fates of his loved ones.^{[ch. 197]} As the series progressed, Neji refined his Gentle Fist and devised original variations that either increased their potency or fixed flaws such as the blind spot in his Byakugan.^{[ch. 197]} Neji also remedied the estranged relations between himself and the members of the main house, resulting in his training with Hiashi and Hinata at the end of Part I.^{[ch. 238]} Neji is killed during the Fourth Great Ninja War as he sacrificed himself to protect Naruto and Hinata from Obito Uchiha's attack, telling Naruto that he made the choice to die protecting those dear to him as his father had. Following the war's conclusion, a memorial was held in Neji's honor. Years after the war, Naruto paid tribute to Neji by naming his son Boruto Uzumaki whose name means "bolt" while Neji's name means "screw". He then named his daughter Himawari after Nejis favourite flowers, Sunflowers. In the Japanese anime, his voice actor is Kōichi Tōchika, and when he is featured as a child, he is voiced by Keiko Nemoto. His voice in the English anime is provided by Steve Staley, and Wendee Lee provides his child voice.

==== Tenten ====
Tenten (テンテン) is a member of Team Guy. Of all the Naruto protagonists, Tenten receives the least screen time in the series.^{[ch. 73]}. In battle, Tenten specializes in weaponry, ranging from projectiles to close-combat weapons and even explosives by the second part of the series. Tenten uses this expertise to help Neji Hyuga train his defensive techniques, and she holds him in high regard since he can always block her attacks.^{[ch. 98]} In the series epilogue, Tenten runs her own weapons shop. Her Japanese voice actress is Yukari Tamura, and her English voice actress is Danielle Judovits.

==== Might Guy ====
Might Guy (マイト・ガイ, Maito Gai) is the leader of Team Guy who dedicates most of his time to his pupil Rock Lee, who emulates himself in his sensei's image and ideals, including his "My Rules" philosophy, which involves setting tough self-imposed penalties for failure in the belief that the punishment will make him stronger.^{[ch. 180]} Like Lee, Guy relies on his mastery of taijutsu, but unlike his pupil he is fully capable of using ninjutsu and genjutsu. He taught Lee many of the techniques he learned from his father Might Duy, such as the ability to unlock the Eight Gates which safely restrict the flow of chakra through the body. When not teaching Lee, Guy is usually found competing with his self-proclaimed childhood rival, Kakashi Hatake. Throughout the series, Kakashi never displays a particular interest in their rivalry, which only further motivates Guy to defeat him.^{[ch. 65]} Guy is an extremely capable ninja as seen in his fight against Itachi Uchiha and his recurring confrontations with Kisame Hoshigaki,^{[ch. 143]} beating him single-handedly on two occasions.^{[ch. 258]}^{[ch. 506]} During the Fourth Great Ninja War, Guy is forced to use the Eighth Gate in a failed attempt to defeat Madara. Though Naruto uses the power of the Sage of Six Paths to save his life, Guy's right leg is too damaged to be fully healed. Though he is not wavered from his shinobi career, he remains in a paraplegic state by the events of the epilogue.

Series creator Masashi Kishimoto had likened Guy's passionate personality to that of a physical education teacher he had in junior high school, but notes that the teacher was not a model for Guy's character. In the Japanese anime, his voice actor is Masashi Ebara (who also voices Guy's father, Duy), with Mayuki Makiguchi voicing him as a child. In the English anime, Guy is voiced by Skip Stellrecht (except in Rock Lee and his Ninja Pals, where he is voiced by Matthew Mercer), with Todd Haberkorn voicing him as a child.

=== Sand Siblings ===
The Sand Siblings (砂の三姉弟, Suna no Sankyōdai) are ninjas from the village of Sunagakure and the children of the Fourth Kazekage, the former leader of the village.^{[ch. 59]} They come to Konohagakure to participate in the biannual Chunin exams, and serve as antagonists in the subsequent invasion of Konohagakure. Because of their interactions with Naruto Uzumaki, and learning their father was murdered by their supposed ally Orochimaru, the Sand Siblings return as allies of Konohagakure, aiding Naruto's group in their attempts to retrieve Sasuke Uchiha from Orochimaru's forces. Kishimoto changed their costumes for their return due to the difficulty in drawing their original attire, as well as to symbolize their new friendship with Konohagakure. In Part II, Gaara becomes Kazekage with his older siblings serving under him as his bodyguards during the Kage Summit at the Land of Iron.

==== Gaara ====
Gaara (我愛羅) is the youngest of the three siblings, created as a foil to Naruto Uzumaki, with a similar background yet a highly divergent personality. Before being born, Gaara was made into a weapon by his father by becoming the Jinchuriki of the Tailed Beast Shukaku the One-Tail (一尾の守鶴, Ichibi no Shukaku). This act caused the death of his mother during labor and Gaara was placed in the care of his mother's younger brother. Like any other Jinchuriki and because his sand unconsciously attacked those around him when he was threatened, Gaara was tormented by his father and fellow villagers as well as his uncle.^{[ch. 131]} Unlike Naruto, however, Gaara comes to see himself as omnipotent and that anyone who challenges him or his power must die. When he battles Naruto during the invasion of Konoha, learning that he is also a Jinchuriki like himself, Gaara's outlook changes as he resolves to help others and he succeeds his deceased father as Sunagakure's Fifth Kazekage during Part II.^{[ch. 249]} Gaara is eventually nabbed by Deidara and Sasori, both Akatsuki members; they then extract Shukaku, the tailed beast sealed inside him, killing Gaara in the process. Chiyo, Sasori's grandmother, eventually revives Gaara. Gaara's Japanese voice actor is Akira Ishida and his English voice actor is Liam O'Brien.

==== Kankuro ====
Kankuro (カンクロウ, Kankurō) is the middle of the three siblings. For the first half of the series, he is frequently at odds with Gaara, though he tends to hold his tongue for fear of being killed.^{[ch. 36]} In Part II, once Gaara begins to reveal his dreams and motivations to Kankuro, Kankuro becomes very protective of Gaara; he lashes out at anyone who speaks poorly of Gaara and when Gaara is kidnapped, he readily risks his life to save him.^{[ch. 249]} Kankuro is a talented puppeteer, normally using his bladed attack puppet Crow (烏, Karasu) and trapping puppet Black Ant (黒蟻, Kuroari) in combination attacks. He also possesses the large puppet Salamander (山椒魚, Sanshōuo) that provides him with combination defense and offense. After his puppets were destroyed by their creator, Kankuro gains a new puppet in Sasori's lifeless body Scorpion (蠍, Sasori) and modifies it for his use as a normal puppet. During the Fourth Great Ninja War, after defeating the reanimated Sasori and breaking Kabuto's hold over him, Kankuro is entrusted with the Mother and Father puppets. In the series epilogue, Kankuro continues to serve as Gaara's bodyguard. In the Japanese anime, his voice actor is Yasuyuki Kase, and his English voice actor is Michael Lindsay, until he was replaced by Doug Erholtz in 2013 (after the former retired the previous year).

==== Temari ====
Temari (テマリ) is the oldest of the three siblings. Unlike her more combat-loving brothers, Temari values peace, as she questions Sunagakure's justifications for going to war with Konohagakure.^{[ch. 95]} This trait carries over to Part II, in which she begins acting as a liaison between Sunagakure and Konohagakure to help the two villages work together. In her time in Konohagakure, Temari is often seen walking with Shikamaru Nara, causing other characters to think they are dating, although both deny this.^{[ch. 247]} In battle, Temari wields a giant iron fan that can create powerful gusts of wind capable of leveling the surrounding landscape. As she is skilled at deducing an opponent's strategies and weaknesses soon after a battle begins, she typically uses her winds to remove parts of the battlefield that might be advantageous to the enemy.^{[ch. 107]} During Part I of the series, Temari is able to use the Summoning Jutsu, in which she can summon a powerful scythe-wielding weasel called Kamatari (カマタリ).^{[ch. 214]} In the series epilogue, Temari is revealed to have moved to the Hidden Leaf and married Shikamaru, with whom she has a son, Shikadai.^{[ch. 700]} Temari's voice actress in the Japanese anime is Romi Park and her English voice actress is Tara Platt.

=== Team Moegi ===
Team Moegi (モエギ班, Moegi-Han) is a group of Konohagakure ninja led by Moegi Kazamatsuri who appears in Boruto: Naruto Next Generations. The three members are the newest generation of the Ino-Shika-Cho, a generational team encompassing members of the Akimichi, Nara, and Yamanaka clans.

==== Shikadai Nara ====
Shikadai Nara (奈良 シカダイ, Nara Shikadai) is the son of Shikamaru Nara and Temari, and Boruto's best friend, who attends Konoha's ninja academy.^{[ch. 700]} He inherits his father's relaxed unenthusiastic personality and fighting style through the Shadow Imitation Technique while blunt and outspoken like his mother. During the events of Boruto: Naruto the Movie, Shikadai faces Boruto in the Chunin Exam finals and is deemed the winner by default because Boruto was discovered to having cheated during their match. Shikadai is voiced by Kenshō Ono in Japanese and by Todd Haberkorn in the English dub.

==== Chocho Akimichi ====
Chocho Akimichi (秋道 チョウチョウ, Akimichi Chōchō) is the daughter of Choji Akimichi and Karui who attends Konoha's ninja academy.^{[ch. 700]} Like her father, inheriting the Akimichi's clan fighting style, she never turns down an invitation when it comes to food and is quite confident and self-assured about herself, a trait she perhaps inherited from her mother. But during the events of Naruto: The Seventh Hokage and the Scarlet Spring, Chocho becomes conscious of her weight while starting to think that she might be an adopted child. Chocho accompanies her friend Sarada in search of her father, Sasuke, believing the trip to be in search of her "real" father instead. When she witnesses her father's slender figure, she becomes eager to learn the technique. Chocho is voiced by Ryoko Shiraishi in Japanese and by Colleen Villard in the English dub.

==== Inojin Yamanaka ====
Inojin Yamanaka (山中 いのじん, Yamanaka Inojin) is the son of Sai and Ino Yamanaka who attends Konoha's ninja academy.^{[ch. 700]}. Inojin uses the Super Beast Scroll technique, following his father, but is also being trained in using his clan's mind-altering techniques by his mother. Inojin is voiced by Atsushi Abe in Japanese and by Spike Spencer in the English dub.

==== Moegi Kazamatsuri ====
Moegi Kazamatsuri (風祭モエギ) is a member of Team Ebisu, consisting of her, Konohamaru Sarutobi, and Udon, with whom she forms the "Konohamaru Ninja Squad". The team is still academy students in Part 1, but has graduated to genin by Part 2. In the Boruto: Naruto Next Generation manga series, the now adult Moegi has been promoted to jonin and is leading Shikadai, Chocho, and Inojin as part of her team. Like Hashirama and Yamato, Moegi possesses the ability to use Wood-Style Jutsu. She is voiced by Noriko Shitaya in the Japanese anime and Wendee Lee in the English adaptation.

=== Team Hanabi ===
Team Hanabi (ハナビ班, Hanabi-Han), also known as Team 15, is an all-kunoichi team of Konohagakure ninja led by Hanabi Hyuga who appears in Boruto: Naruto Next Generations.

==== Sumire Kakei ====
Sumire Kakei (筧 スミレ, Kakei Sumire) is a class representative during Boruto's time in the Hidden Leaf's Academy, and is close friends with Sarada and Chocho. Sumire inherited a curse mark devised by her father, a former Foundation member named Tanuki Shigaraki, that allows her to summon an artificial creature called Nue. In the first arc of the anime, orphaned as a result of the former Foundation members being ostracized, Sumire wished to continue her father's work in taking revenge on the Hidden Leaf, but Boruto convinces her to let go of her past and find her own path. Sumire later graduates to a genin and becomes a member of an all-kunoichi team, later gaining a place in the Scientific Ninja Weapons Team after falling in love with Boruto. Sumire is voiced by Aya Endō in Japanese and by Erica Lindbeck in the English dub.

==== Namida Suzumeno ====
Namida Suzumeno (雀乃 なみだ, Suzumeno Namida) is a Konohagakure ninja genin who is prone to crying, possessing a jutsu that produces a high-pitch sound wave capable of incapacitate those who hear her. As her skill is untrained, she avoids using it to harm her teammates. In the Japanese anime, Namida is voiced by Sara Matsumoto and in the English anime, her voice actress is Tara Sands.

==== Wasabi Izuno ====
Wasabi Izuno (伊豆野 ワサビ, Izuno Wasabi) is a ninja genin from Konohagakure. She fights using a transformation jutsu that allow her to assume the characteristics of a cat. Wasabi's voice actress in the Japanese anime is Natsumi Yamada, while her voice actress in the English adaptation is Cassandra Morris.

==== Tsubaki Kurogane ====
Tsubaki Kurogane (鉄 ツバキ, Kurogane Tsubaki) is a samurai who was a disciple of Mifune, and was brought to Konohagakure to replace Sumire Kakei on Team Hanabi as she joined the Scientific Ninja Weapons Team. Not much is known about her except she is a skilled samurai and therefore perfectly masters kenjutsu (use of swords). In the Japanese anime, Tsubaki's voice actresses is Juri Nagatsuma in Japanese and Erica Mendez in the English dub.

==== Hanabi Hyuga ====
Hanabi Hyuga (日向 ハナビ, Hyūga Hanabi) is the youngest daughter of Hiashi Hyūga and the younger sister of Hinata Hyuga. She loves and admires her older sister very much and the feeling is mutual. In Boruto: Naruto Next Generations, Hanabi becomes the leader of her own team of genin, in addition to her duties as heiress of the clan. In the Japanese anime, she is voiced by Kiyomi Asai, while being voiced by Colleen Villard in the English dub. She is also voiced by Kari Wahlgren in the video game Naruto Shippuden: Ultimate Ninja Storm 4.

=== Team Udon ===
Team Udon (ウドン班, Udon-Han), also known as Team 5, is a group of Konohagakure ninja led by Udon Ise who appears in Boruto: Naruto Next Generations.

==== Metal Lee ====
Metal Lee (メタル・リー, Metaru Rī) is the son of Rock Lee who attends Konoha's ninja academy.^{[ch. 700]} Like his father, Metal relies on his taijutsu, but gets nervous when being watched, causing him to mess up his techniques. Metal is voiced by Ryō Nishitani in Japanese and Billy Kametz in English up until episode 176, with Sean Chiplock taking over the role for subsequent episodes.

==== Iwabe Yuino ====
Iwabe Yuino (結乃 イワベエ, Yuino Iwabei) is a Konohagakure Academy student. While a standout during his entire time enrolled, his poor test grades lead him to be held back repeatedly. Iwabi uses Earth Style techniques. He is voiced by Shin'ya Hamazoe ^{(ja)} in Japanese and Ray Chase in English.

==== Denki Kaminarimon ====
Denki Kaminarimon (雷門 デンキ, Kaminarimon Denki) is a Konohagakure Academy student, and the heir to the Kaminarimon Company. Denki carries a laptop with him most times, and knows a lot about technology because of his father. However, he is not proficient in jutsu, asking Iwabe to help him pass the jutsu exam in the academy. He is voiced by Chihiro Ikki in Japanese and Erica Mendez in English. Denki is known to be smart.

==== Udon Ise ====
Udon Ise (伊勢ウドン, Ise Udon) is a member of Team Ebisu, consisting of himself, Konohamaru Sarutobi, and Moegi, with whom they form the "Konohamaru Ninja Squad". The team is still academy students in Part 1, but has graduated to genin by Part 2. In the Boruto: Naruto Next Generation manga series, the now adult Udon has been promoted to jonin and is leading Metal Lee, Iwabi and Denki as part of his team. As a child, he is voiced by Tomo Shigematsu in the Japanese anime and Kate Higgins in the English version, and as an adult, he is voiced by Ikuji Nose in Japanese and by Edward Bosco in English.

== Antagonists ==
=== Zabuza Momochi ===
Zabuza Momochi (桃地 再不斬, Momochi Zabuza) is a former member of Kirigakure's Seven Swordsmen of the Mist, a group of ninja that use particularly large swords in battle. He is one of Team Seven's first opponents. Zabuza possesses a sword called Kubikiri Bōchō (首斬り包丁; it. Decapitating Knife). After a failed coup d'état, wherein he tried to assassinate the Fourth Mizukage Yagura Karatachi, Zabuza and his followers fled the village and began working as mercenary assassins.^{[ch. 30]} He also takes in a young boy, Haku, as his apprentice, mostly treating him as a tool although he ultimately does care for him.^{[ch. 32]} Zabuza is skilled in water-based abilities, but his area of expertise is in assassinations in areas covered by mist.^{[ch. 26]} His talents lead to his commission by a criminal named Gato to kill a man named Tazuna, which he is unable to perform due to interference by the Leaf village's Team seven consisting of Kakashi Hatake, Naruto Uzumaki, Sasuke Uchiha, and Sakura Haruno. Because he takes too long to complete the task, his contract is revoked, and his employer tries to have Zabuza killed. Having been redeemed by Naruto, Zabuza kills Gato first, though is mortally wounded and dies soon afterwards.^{[ch. 32]} He is one of the shinobi resurrected by Kabuto to fight on the Akatsuki side and is defeated, being sealed during a rematch with Kakashi.^{[ch. 516, 524]} In the Japanese anime, his voice actor is Unshō Ishizuka, and his English voice actor is Steven Blum.

=== Haku ===
Haku (白) is Zabuza Momochi's most faithful follower. Before he started working for Zabuza, Haku lived as an orphan. His father killed his mother when it was discovered that Haku possesses a genetic ability, Hyōton (氷遁; lit. "Ice Release"), that allows him to mix wind and water elements to create ice,^{[ch. 24]} which was considered a threat. Haku then killed his father. After wandering from place to place, he was found by Zabuza, who recognized Haku's talents and agreed to take him in as a tool. As a result, Haku becomes unquestioningly protective of and loyal to Zabuza, and only by being useful does he find a purpose in life.^{[ch. 29]} Haku later meets Naruto (who mistakes him for a girl) while he is training, and the two bond over their connections. On this same mission, Haku ultimately gives his life in his mission to save his master from Kakashi's Lightning Blade, becoming the first casualty in the series. This is not in vain, however, as a saddened Naruto uses Haku's death to redeem Zabuza.^{[ch. 30]} Episode 17 of the anime greatly expands on Haku's early life, showing the scene where Haku discovered his powers. Haku is resurrected by Kabuto Yakushi later in Part 2 of the series to fight in the Fourth Shinobi World War until being sealed by the Allied Shinobi Forces.^{[ch. 516, 524]} His voice actress in the Japanese anime is Mayumi Asano, and his English voice actress is Susan Dalian. Mona Marshall voiced Haku as a child.

=== Orochimaru ===
Orochimaru (大蛇丸) is an S-ranked criminal who served as the primary antagonist of Part I of the Naruto series, having previously affiliated with the Akatsuki. He was a former Hidden Leaf Ninja and Hiruzen's student alongside his teammates Jiraiya and Tsunade, who are revered as the Legendary Sannin.^{[ch. 170]} Orochimaru's desire for immortality, so he can learn every jutsu in existence, led him to experimenting on fellow ninja before establishing his own ninja village, the Hidden Sound Village, as his personal laboratory, to continue his work while amassing a personal army to destroy Konoha.^{[ch. 69]} His immortality technique involves transferring his consciousness between different host bodies every few years, with his intent to acquire the body of Sasuke Uchiha being his driving motivations throughout most of the series.^{[ch. 238]} Following end of Part II, through kept under watch by Yamato, Orochimaru renounced his personal war against the Hidden Leaf Village. He has since created Mitsuki.

=== Kabuto Yakushi ===
Kabuto Yakushi (薬師 カブト, Yakushi Kabuto) is a spy who works as Orochimaru's right hand, though he acts on his own whims. As a child with no memory of his past, Kabuto was found on a battlefield by a nun from Konohagakure who raised him before he was recruited by the Foundation as their spy to infiltrate numerous countries and organizations.^{[ch. 289, 583]} But after being labeled a risk to the Foundation for knowing too many secrets, Kabuto becomes Orochimaru's spy after being promised an identity he can call his own.^{[ch. 584]} Using his former affiliations, and infiltrating the Akatsuki, Kabuto gathers intelligence on Orochimaru's behalf; for instance, he participates in the bi-annual Chunin Exams as a Konoha representative to gather information on his fellow participants.^{[ch. 88]} Highly proficient with medical techniques and genetic manipulation, Kabuto devises means to heal wounds by reactivating dead cells to grow new ones, and can form a scalpel with chakra to deal surgical strikes to his opponents.^{[ch. 164]}

In Part II, after his mentor's defeat by Sasuke, Kabuto integrates some of Orochimaru's remains into his body to become powerful enough to not serve anyone again.^{[ch. 357]} Kabuto then masters snake Sage Jutsu while modifying his body with DNA samples of the Sound Five, Jugo, Suigetsu, and Karin to increase his abilities further. After perfecting the Reanimation Jutsu, using it to bring back Madara Uchiha as his personal trump card, Kabuto forces Obito Uchiha into a tenuous alliance with him under the promise that he can have Sasuke upon victory against the Ninja Alliance.^{[ch. 520]} However, during the second day of the Fourth Great Ninja War, Itachi manages to break free of Kabuto's control and force him to end the Reanimation Jutsu with Sasuke's help. The ordeal of being subjected to Itachi's Izanami genjutsu has Kabuto re-evaluate himself and his life, coming to the conclusion that he should save Sasuke. In the war's aftermath, kept under surveillance by the Hidden Leaf, Kabuto returns to run the orphanage where he was held as a kid, together with his adopted brother Urushi. In the Japanese anime, Kabuto is voiced by Nobutoshi Canna, and his English voice actor is Henry Dittman.

=== Danzo Shimura ===
Danzo Shimura (志村 ダンゾウ, Shimura Danzō) is one of the oldest villagers in Konohagakure, and a moderately cantankerous war hawk who was Hiruzen's rival whom he consequently opposed along with the other Hokage for placing world peace above their village's best interests.^{[ch. 285]} As Hiruzen obtained the Third Hokage title, Danzo uses the Root and his own personal Root black ops to secretly oversee their village's security along with his personal goal to become a Hokage.^{[ch. 298]} This led to Danzo being responsible for events that included Kabuto's defection and orchestrating the Uchiha Massacre. The latter event result in him having the transplanted right eye of Shisui Uchiha, along with having Orochimaru using Shin's genetic makeup to graft Danzo's right arm with a large number of Sharingan eyes and Hashirama's cells. Following Pain's attack devastating Konohagakure, Danzo took advantage of Tsunade's coma in convincing the Fire Country's feudal lord to make him Acting Candidate Sixth Hokage (六代目火影候補, Rokudaime Hokage Kouho) and uses his position to decree Sasuke a wanted criminal before attaining the Five Kage summit to convince the formation of the Shinobi alliance with himself as its leader. But the plan fails when Sasuke Uchiha infiltrated the meeting place and the other kages figured out that Danzo possesses Shisui's right eye. While attempting to flee the area, he ultimately committs suicide after he battled and lost to Sasuke. He then uses the last of his strength in an attempted sealing jutsu on Sasuke and Obito.^{[ch. 481]} Though the jutsu failed, Danzō destroyed Shisui's Sharingan to ensure Obito would not obtain it. With Danzo's death, the Root ended in the aftermath of the Fourth Great Ninja War with its members allowed to live in peace while integrating back into society. In the Japanese anime he is voiced by Hiroshi Ito and in the English version he is voiced by William Frederick Knight except in Rock Lee and His Ninja Pals, where he is voiced by Richard Epcar.

=== Sound Five ===
The Sound Five (音隠れの忍四人衆, Otogakure no Shinobi Yonin Shū; lit. "Hidden Sound Shinobi Five People", English TV: "Sound Ninja Five) are Orochimaru's elite bodyguards. The group was originally known as the "Sound Five", but after Kimimaro became bedridden due to his unknown illness, the group resumed calling themselves the Sound Four.^{[ch. 201]} As a group they specialize in barriers, defensive walls, sealing techniques as well as possessing their own individual unique techniques and Curse Marks that increase their strengths.^{[ch. 184]} The group is composed of:

- Jirobo (次郎坊, Jirōbō), a large, and quick-tempered, man who specializes in absorbing chakra and close-quarters combat.^{[ch. 187]} He is voiced by Kenta Miyake in the Japanese anime, while his English voice actor is Michael Sorich.
- Kidomaru (鬼童丸, Kidōmaru), a six-armed ninja who can produce spider-webs to fight and specialized in ranged combat.^{[ch. 192]} He is voiced by Susumu Chiba in the Japanese anime, while his English voice actor is Peter Lurie.
- Sakon and Ukon (左近 - 右近, Sakon to Ukon) are twin brothers who are the strongest of the Sound Four and count as one member due to their ability to merge their bodies with anyone and kill an opponent at a cellular level.^{[ch. 203,204]} Both Sakon and Ukon are voiced by Shunsuke Sakuya in the Japanese anime, while their English voice actor is Brian Beacock.
- Tayuya (多由也, Tayuya), a female flautist who uses her flute for genjutsu and controlling summoned demons.^{[ch. 206]} She is voiced by Akeno Watanabe in the Japanese anime, while her English voice actress is Kari Wahlgren.
- Kimimaro (君麻呂, Kimimaro), the last of the Kaguya Clan who has his kin's Kekkei Genkai ability to manipulate his bone structure, called the Shikotsumyaku, became the leader after he defeated the entire group in battle. He is voiced by Toshiyuki Morikawa in the Japanese anime with Makoto Tsumura voicing him as a child. His English voice actor is Keith Silverstein with Kari Wahlgren voicing him as a child.

The Sound Four (later Sound Five) do not become a prominent part of the story until sent by their leader to escort Sasuke Uchiha to him. Even with Kimimaro joining the group to ensure Sasuke's passage to Orochimaru, the Sound Five all died in the process: Jirobo and Kidomaru killed in their respective fights against Chōji Akimichi and Neji Hyūga, Sakon and Ukon taken out by Kankuro as they nearly kill Kiba Inuzuka, Tayuya indirectly killed by Temari as she had the upper hand on Shikamaru Nara, and Kimimaro succumbed to his unknown illness in the midst of his battle against Gaara and Rock Lee.^{[ch. 184, 217]} During the Fourth Shinobi World War, Kimimaro is reanimated by Kabuto Yakushi as a pawn to battle against the Allied Shinobi Forces.^{[ch. 515]} In the anime adaptation, unaware that Kabuto brought them back instead of Orochimaru, the Sound Four were also reanimated and were allowed to act on their impulse for revenge against the members of the Sasuke Retrieval group before being defeated. It was also at the time of the war's climax that Kabuto reveals that he assimilated the Sound Five's DNA to access their abilities.^{[ch. 585]}

=== Akatsuki ===
From left to right: Sasori, Deidara, Konan, Nagato, Tobi, Itachi and Kisame. Behind: Zetsu, Kakuzu, Hidan and Orochimaru.

The Akatsuki (暁; lit. "Dawn" or "Daybreak") is an organization of criminal ninja that serves as the primary antagonistic force of Part II of the Naruto series. It was founded by Yahiko, Nagato and Konan. After Yahiko's death, it was led by Nagato with Obito as his benefactor. The Akatsuki's goal is world peace through the power of the nine Tailed Beasts, with Nagato assuming it would involve mass destruction giving way to a world without war.^{[ch. 239]} To achieve their goal of collecting all nine Tailed Beasts, the Akatsuki recruited several rogue ninja, including Deidara, Sasori, and Hidan, among other notable Akatsuki members, to join their ranks. The real goal is for Obito to enact Madara's Project Tsuki no Me (月の眼計画, Tsuki no Me Keikaku; literally "Eye of the Moon Plan"), which involves feeding the Tailed Beasts to the Gedo Statue, to revert it into the Ten-Tails with Obito as its Jinchuriki; empowered thus, he would project the Infinite Tsukiyomi on the moon's surface, and bring all life into a utopic illusion. The members of the Akatsuki are ninja who have abandoned their villages, and are considered by their former homes to be S-class criminals, the most powerful and wanted ninja in the Naruto universe. Aside from an attempt by members Itachi Uchiha and Kisame Hoshigaki to capture Kurama (the Nine-Tailed fox sealed within Naruto Uzumaki), the Akatsuki is not prominently featured in Part I.^{[ch. 143]} In Part II, they take a more active role, capturing Gaara and extracting the One-Tailed Tanuki, Shukaku, from his body, as well as progressively capturing the remaining Tailed Beasts.^{[ch. 261]} Kishimoto called the Akatsuki's members antiheroes as he wished to expand their backgrounds as much as the ones from the series' protagonists, contrasting them with other types of villains.

==== Obito Uchiha ====
Obito Uchiha (うちは オビト, Uchiha Obito), also known under his alias Tobi (トビ) is the true leader of the Akatsuki and the primary antagonist for most of Part II of the Naruto series. As a child during the Third Great Ninja War, being Kakashi's teammate in Team Minato, Obito was similar to Naruto in both wanting to become Hokage and unrequited love for his teammate Rin. When he and Kakashi rescue Rin after she was kidnapped by Hidden Stone Ninja during a mission, Obito's right side got crushed in a landslide. Obito believed his death was certain and had Rin transplant his left Sharingan into Kakashi to replace the latter's original left eye. Obito finds himself saved by Madara and outfitted with Zetsu prosthetics, and is conditioned to become his apprentice, the ninja arranging Obito to witness Rin's death as a casualty of war by a reluctant Kakashi to break his spirit. Coming to the conclusion that he can use the Tailed Beasts to destroy the current reality and create a utopia, Obito takes up Madara's name following the latter's death while masking his voice. Obito would then arrange similar events for Nagato with Yahiko's death to create the current incarnation of the Akatsuki.^{[ch. 602, 606]} Obito serves a behind-the-scenes role throughout the first half of Part II while revealed to have caused tragedy prior to the series, most notably Kurama's attack on the Hidden Leaf as revenge on his sensei Minato for not protecting Rin.^{[ch. 501]} Other than being able to use his right Sharingan to cast Kamui in a fashion that renders him intangible and lets him teleport over great distances, Obito can use Wood Style attacks as his prosthetics possess Hashirama's cells.^{[ch. 310, 395]}

==== Zetsu ====
Zetsu (ゼツ) is the only member of the Akatsuki without a bespoke partner, the only nonhuman member, and Obito's right-hand man. Originally, Kaguya created a shadow-like parasitic entity known as Black Zetsu (黒ゼツ, Kuro Zetsu) to manipulate her grandson Indra and his descendants throughout history for one of them to manifest a Rinnegan and free his creator. Black Zetsu succeeds with Madara, whom he deceived into believing that he had created the entity. White Zetsu (白ゼツ, Shiro Zetsu) was originally part of an army that Kaguya was assembling to fend off her kinsmen, consisting of humans mutated into drones after being assimilated by the Ten Tails during Kaguya's previous Infinite Tsukuyomi. Black and White Zetsu operate in symbiosis, Black Zetsu occasionally argued with his easygoing host. As White Zetsu is an extension of the Shinju, he can merge into the ground or vegetation to quickly travel to a new location, and use spores to create clones of himself or whoever he touches.^{[ch. 289]} This makes Zetsu not only of use to the Akatsuki as a spy, but also to devour bodies of deceased Akatsuki members or those the organization does not want found.^{[ch. 255, 261]} Another of the White Zetsu retrieved from the Gedo Statue, initially referred to as Guruguru (グルグル) due to the spiral-shaped pattern on his body, later named Tobi (トビ), served as an exosuit for Obito while the youth got used to his new body. After White Zetsu is killed by Sasuke during the Fourth Great Ninja War, Black Zetsu goes into hiding, accompanies and merges with Obito, and tricks him into reviving Madara.^{[ch. 575, 656]} Ultimately, once the Eye of the Moon Plan runs its course, Black Zetsu reveals his true identity and fuses himself onto Madara to convert the human into a new body for Kaguya to inhabit.^{[ch. 674]} Black Zetsu then reveals his role in the conflict between the Senju and Uchiha, while helping Kaguya fight Naruto and Sasuke. He is eventually ripped away from his creator when Naruto severs Kaguya's arm. As Kaguya is sealed away once more, Black Zetsu is thrown by Naruto into the forming moon so he would not make another attempt to free his creator.^{[ch. 681, 688, 690]} Tobi, having participated in the war by encasing Yamato to access his Wood-Style, before ejecting him once the Infinite Tsukiyomi is cast, crumbles away after the jutsu is canceled, with his former captive the only witness to his death.^{[ch. 699]}

As Kishimoto originally planned the Akatsuki to be a group of individuals with close to no human characteristics, he decided to make Zetsu half black and half white to emphasize his split personality. In the Japanese anime, Zetsu is voiced by Nobuo Tobita, who also voices the Tobi and the White Zetsu Army. In episode 134 of the English adaptation, Black Zetsu is voiced by Michael Sorich and White Zetsu by Brian Beacock, though both in the English Shippuden anime are voiced by Travis Willingham alongside Tobi and the White Zetsu Army.

==== Kisame Hoshigaki ====
Kisame Hoshigaki (干柿 鬼鮫, Hoshigaki Kisame) is a former ninja of Kirigakure and partnered to Itachi Uchiha, having a unique appearance with pale blue skin, a gill-like facial structure, and sharp acute angled triangle teeth. While he was loyal to Kirigakure, Kisame was one of the Seven Swordsmen of the Mist, a group of violent ninja that use particularly large swords in battle. His sword, Samehada (鮫肌, "Sharkskin" in Shippuden), is a living weapon covered in scales. Although it was covered in bandage like cloth in the Akatsuki arc (while he was travelling with Itachi Uchiha). It can absorb untold amounts of an opponent's chakra. Only allowing those it sees as worthy to wield it, Samehada can provide the user with the chakra it holds, ensuring him an infinite amount of stamina. Kisame himself has massive amounts of chakra,^{[ch. 142]} and by fusing Samehada into him, Kisame can assume a shark-like form that increases his abilities. In battle, he frequently shapes water into the forms of sharks to damage opponents.^{[ch. 258]} After discarding Samehada when it chose Killer Bee over him, Kisame is decapitated by Killer Bee and the Raikage using Double Lariat. It is later revealed that the decapitation was just a shapeshifting technique performed by Zetsu; the real Kisame having hidden inside Samehada.^{[ch. 487]} After Kisame's supposed death, Killer Bee took Samehada for himself, therefore allowing Kisame to enter the Hidden Cloud Village. After a while, he was discovered by Naruto and Kisame attempts to flee with crucial intel from the Allied Shinobi Force but is defeated by Might Guy and captured. Kisame then commits suicide by summoning sharks and allowing them to eat him, but not before using one of them to steal back the information he had compiled and send it to the Akatsuki.^{[ch. 508]} His voice actor in the Japanese anime is Tomoyuki Dan; in English, he is voiced by Michael McConnohie in his first appearance and then by Kirk Thornton from then on.

==== Konan ====
Konan (小南) is the only female ninja in the Akatsuki. As such, Kishimoto originally wanted her to have an obscene appearance showing more of her bust. Being the partner of Pain, Konan was also a pupil under Jiraiya after she was orphaned as a child by one of Amegakure's many wars and forced to fend for herself. Because she serves under Pain, she is referred to by villagers of Amegakure as "God's angel". Under Jiraiya, Konan learned to take advantage of her natural talent with origami, using it as a key component in her battle style.^{[ch. 373, 449]} Konan can divide her body into countless sheets of paper, which she controls and reshapes remotely to scout out an area, form weapons for attack, or create wings that mirror her title. While Konan's abilities are restricted when the paper is wet, since paper will cling and lose its stiffness, she is able to use this weakness to her advantage as she implements explosive tags into her paper clones. After Nagato's death, Konan withdraws her position in the Akatsuki and proclaims loyalty to Naruto.^{[ch. 372]} Later, she is confronted by Obito over the location of Nagato's Rinnegan eyes. She fights him in a suicide assault, but is killed after being forced to reveal Nagato's resting place. She last sees the endless rain of Amegakure stop for the first time.^{[ch. 510]} In the Japanese anime, Konan is voiced by Atsuko Tanaka and in the English anime, her voice actress is Dorothy Elias-Fahn.

==== Nagato ====
Nagato (うずまき), primarily known under the alias of Pain (ペイン, Pein), is the founder and recognized leader of the Akatsuki, he is the partner of Konan, with Obito acting as his benefactor.^{[ch. 510]} The "Pain" most often seen in the series is the Deva Path, which is actually Nagato's deceased friend, Yahiko (弥彦), one of six animated corpses collectively known as "The Six Paths of Pain" (ペイン六道, Pein Rikudō), all controlled by Nagato and using one sixth of his full power.^{[ch. 378, 419]} The Pain Paths are all outfitted with a number of body piercings that serve as a means for Nagato to control them and to give them a "more dangerous" appearance in relation to their name's installation. Nagato, former student of the late Legendary Sannin Jiraiya, killed Jiraiya when he was in the middle of an infiltration mission. After the skirmish, Nagato decided to invade Konohagakure or the Hidden Leaf Village to prevent them from sending more shinobi to avenge Jiraiya and to collect the Nine-Tails, therefore Naruto. After Nagato used his Deva Path to decimate the entire village and the majority of the population, including Kakashi Hatake, Naruto appeared and defeated all Six Paths of Pain using a newly learned Sage Mode. Naruto then located the original Pain, meaning Nagato, and convinced him to help Naruto bring peace to the ninja world and, after a change of heart, Nagato used the Rinne Rebirth jutsu, which basically revives recently deceased individuals. Due to the sheer strength to revive almost every single person in the Hidden Leaf, Nagato died from the immense strain after successfully reviving everyone. During the Fourth Great Ninja War, Kabuto Yakushi reanimated Nagato Uzumaki alongside Itachi Uchiha. Both individuals eventually had a skirmish with Naruto. Itachi Uchiha then broke free from Kabuto's control after casting Shisui Uchiha's Kotoamatsukami upon himself. The Kotoamatsukami basically subtly or directly overwrites the will of a person. After Itachi broke free from Kabuto's control, he successfully sealed Nagato in his Sword of Totsuka.

==== Itachi Uchiha ====
Itachi Uchiha (うちは イタチ, Uchiha Itachi) is a former ninja of Konohagakure, the older brother of Sasuke Uchiha, and the partner of Kisame Hoshigaki. Though having spent his early youth as the prodigy of the Uchiha clan, Itachi is treated as the antagonist for much of the series. He is initially portrayed as being solely responsible for the killing of his entire clan and family, sparing only his brother, Sasuke Uchiha, with the explanation that he was testing his abilities.^{[ch. 224]} Around the time of his death, his villainous role is downplayed; not only is he revealed to offer help to Obito Uchiha in killing the clan, though it is revealed in part two that he performed the massacre under the orders of Konoha's leadership to prevent an Uchiha coup d'état.^{[ch. 400]} While battling Sasuke Uchiha, Itachi died in battle due to an unknown illness. Itachi was eventually resurrected by Kabuto during the Fourth Great Ninja War but managed to break free from Kabuto's control, and, together with Sasuke, defeats Kabuto. In the Japanese anime, Itachi's voice actor is Hideo Ishikawa. His first voice actor in the English anime was Skip Stellrecht, who voiced Itachi in episodes 29 and 30, but in all following appearances, he has been voiced by Crispin Freeman.

==== Deidara ====
Deidara (デイダラ) is a former ninja of Iwagakure, having left the village after bombing it. He was a terrorist bomber-for-hire before Itachi Uchiha forced him to join the Akatsuki. Though he came to embrace the organization, Deidara still holds a grudge against Itachi and all other Uchiha throughout the series, as he feels their Sharingan eyes "look down on his artwork".^{[ch. 359]} Deidara, along with his paired-up partner Sasori, nabbed Gaara, the Fifth Kazekage, to attain the One-Tailed Shukaku, though losing his left arm during the battle. Eventually, Hidden Leaf and Sand ninjas try to hunt down the Akatsuki to try to retrieve and avenge Gaara, successfully killing Sasori and Deidara lost his remaining right arm to Kakashi Hatake's Kamui. After successfully getting away, Kakuzu eventually restored both of Deidara's arms and Sasori's position was then replaced by Tobi after his death. Though he was annoyed by Tobi, Deidara becomes somewhat of a teacher to him, and adopts a genuine care for his well-being.^{[ch. 366]} Both of Deidara's hands have mouths on them that, by infusing clay or other fine-grained minerals with chakra, create "sculptures", bombs that explode with varying intensities. Deidara's bombs can take any form he chooses, and from the time of their creation to their detonation, he can animate and control them remotely.^{[ch. 248]} Sasuke Uchiha, Itachi's younger brother, is able to systematically nullify his bombs in combat, and so Deidara transforms himself into a living bomb in a last effort to kill Sasuke and to prove the supremacy of his art, but fails in the attempt.^{[ch. 363]} He is later resurrected by Kabuto for the war against the Shinobi Alliance but is defeated by Kankuro.^{[ch. 520]} His voice actor in the Japanese anime is Katsuhiko Kawamoto. In his cameo appearance in episode 135 of the English adaptation, he is voiced by Quinton Flynn, and in the anime of Shippuden by Roger Craig Smith.

==== Hidan ====
Hidan (飛段) is the immortal, foul-mouthed, and sadomasochistic partner of Kakuzu and a former ninja of Yugakure, the Village Hidden in Boiling Water. He is a member of the Way of Jashin (ジャシン; lit. "evil god") religion which worships a deity of the same name and believes that anything less than death and utter destruction in battle is a sin.^{[ch. 313]} His religion's experimentations have led to the creation of his unique abilities; by consuming an opponent's blood and drawing Jashin's triangular symbol on the ground, Hidan can create a link with his opponent. Once this link is created, any damage done to Hidan's body is reflected on his opponent, allowing him to kill them by giving himself fatal injuries. Though his immortality keeps him from dying or suffer any impairment, Hidan feels his victims' suffering with an excitement bordering on arousal. ^{[ch. 325]} After Hidan used this ability to kill Asuma Sarutobi, Shikamaru Nara fights him to avenge his master. Their battle culminates in Hidan being blown up, and Shikamaru burying his still-speaking remains in a forest that the Akatsuki will never be able to reach.^{[ch. 339]} As such, Hidan is no longer considered a member by the rest of the Akatsuki.^{[ch. 353]} In the Japanese version of the anime, Hidan is voiced by Masaki Terasoma. In the English version, he is voiced by Chris Edgerly and in Naruto Shippūden: Clash of Ninja Revolution 3 by Wally Wingert.

==== Kakuzu ====
Kakuzu (角都) is the partner of Hidan and a former ninja of Takigakure, the Village Hidden in the Waterfalls. Kakuzu is motivated by greed, and joins the Akatsuki to seek out valuable bounties. However, his extreme temperament and fits of rage leading to his eventual murder of whomever he was partnered with resulted in his pairing with the immortal Hidan.^{[ch. 322]} When Kakuzu still lived in his village, he was given a very important mission: assassinate Hashirama Senju, the First Hokage. As the strongest shinobi of his time, Hashirama was far too strong for Kakuzu, and the mission failed with Kakuzu barely escaping with his life. Kakuzu returned to his village, and, despite the overwhelming danger and risk he faced, he was dishonoured and severely punished. Gaining a violent hatred for his village because of this unfair treatment, Kakuzu escaped from prison and, in vengeance, stole his village's forbidden techniques, and murdered the village elders (carving out their hearts), becoming a rogue ninja in the process. Kakuzu's body is composed of a large number of black threads, allowing him to reattach any body part, his or another, back onto its owner. The threads are also capable of piercing flesh, which Kakuzu uses to remove the still-beating hearts of his opponents and integrate their hearts into his body to extend his life indefinitely. Kakuzu can store up to four spare hearts in animal masks that are sewn to his back, which can be detached during combat situations to shoot elemental blasts at his opponents, and quickly recalled to his body if he needs a replacement heart.^{[ch. 336]} Kakuzu's hearts are systematically destroyed soon after his introduction by a group of Konohagakure ninja. After Naruto Uzumaki leaves his final heart on the brink of failure, Kakuzu is easily finished off by Kakashi.^{[ch. 342]} After being resurrected by Kabuto, he is sent out to participate in the war until being sealed. In the Japanese anime, Kakuzu's Japanese voice actor is Takaya Hashi and in the English version he is voiced by Fred Tatasciore.

==== Sasori ====
Sasori (蠍), primarily known as "Sasori of the Red Sand" (赤砂の蠍, Akasuna no Sasori; Tablesori), was a former ninja of Sunagakure and partner of Deidara. When he was a child, Sasori's parents were killed by the father of Kakashi Hatake, Sakumo Hatake, also known as the White Fang of Konoha, leaving him in the care of his grandmother, Chiyo, who taught Sasori the art of puppetry to cheer him up after his loss, which he refined to fit his needs over the years. However, motivated by his desire to make works that last forever, Sasori secretly devised a way to convert the corpses of humans into puppets, allowing him to use any ninja abilities they possessed for himself. Leaving Sunagakure, the Sand village, in his teenage years, Sasori later kidnapped the Third Kazekage, transforming him into a puppet and using him as his main weapon.^{[ch. 267]} Sasori's desire was to become art, so he converted his own body into a puppet, which essentially gives him eternal life and allows him to control hundreds of puppets at once.^{[ch. 271]} After joining the Akatsuki, Sasori was paired with Orochimaru, and after his desertion, was teamed with Deidara, who looks up to him and his artistic knowledge with reverence.^{[ch. 248]}^{[ch. 263]} In the Akatsuki, Sasori spent much time hidden inside Hiruko, a human puppet who served as both weapon and armour, which he adorned with the Akatsuki's robe. After he and Deidara kidnap Gaara, Sasori ends up fighting Sakura and Chiyo. During the battle, after being emotionally touched by seeing puppets he created years ago that resent his killed parents, Sasori allows Chiyo to strike a scroll that represented his heart, the only part of his humanity he kept when converting himself to a puppet, resulting in his death. Before dying, he tells Sakura about his rendezvous with one of Orochimaru's henchmen who had been working for him as a spy.^{[ch. 464]} After being resurrected by Kabuto, Sasori fights Kankuro, who convinces him to be at peace with himself. Sasori comes to terms with his life and is able to pass on and rest in peace. In the Japanese anime, Sasori is voiced by Akiko Yajima as a child and by Takahiro Sakurai as an adult. In the English version he is voiced by Kari Wahlgren as a child and as an adult he is voiced by Johnny Yong Bosch. His scorpion-like puppet body, Hiruko, is voiced by Yutaka Aoyama in the Japanese version and in the English version by JB Blanc.

=== Madara Uchiha ===
Madara Uchiha (うちは マダラ, Uchiha Madara) is one of the co-founders of the Hidden Leaf Village along with Hashirama Senju, the two later revealed to be reincarnations of their clans' founding ancestors Indra and Asura prior to Sasuke and Naruto.^{[ch. 385, 671]} Madara is a cynical and vengeful man who holds grudges against the Senju Clan for slaughtering his brothers in the War. He is very arrogant about his immense battle prowess. Though he was a childhood friend of Hashirama amidst the conflicts of their respective clan, their friendship ends as a result of the war. As the leader of the Uchiha Clan, Madara's overuse of Mangekyo Sharingan blinds him, forcing him to take the eyes of his late younger brother Izuna. This allows Madara to use his newly awakened Eternal Mangekyo Sharingan to continue the ongoing war between the Uchiha and the Senju.^{[ch. 386]} In later years, Hashirama comes forth with a peace offering between the two clans. Though he agrees to have peace with his former rival, Madara feels he would never be accepted by the Senju and loses hope in Hashirama. While working towards this goal, Madara captures Kurama the Nine-Tailed Fox and uses him in a scheme to destroy Konoha.^{[ch. 399, 621]} Madara is believed to have been killed by Hashirama's hand, but he survives and goes into hiding while taking a blood sample of Hashirama with him to awake his Rinnegan.^{[ch. 560]} During this time, Madara takes Obito Uchiha as his agent and transplants his Rinnegan into Nagato to be preserved for his eventual revival years later.^{[ch. 605]}

=== Ōtsutsuki Clan ===

The Ōtsutsuki Clan's main line (above) and branch line (below) symbols

The Ōtsutsuki Clan (大筒木一族, Ōtsutsuki Ichizoku) are ancient clan of horned celestial beings of unknown origin who spent eons seeking out worlds that cultivate with Divine Trees (神樹, Shinju), alien plants that drain a world's resources to produce chakra fruit (チャクラの実, Chakura no Mi) while some are revered by a populace as a sacred symbol. The main family Ōtsutsuki clan would harvest the fruit to prolong their lives while reducing the host planet into a dead world before seeking for another world to plant a new Divine Tree there. Kaguya Ōtsutsuki's descendants produced a branch family which further branched out into the Senju, Uzumaki, Uchiha, and Hyuga Clans.

==== Kaguya Ōtsutsuki ====
Kaguya Ōtsutsuki (大筒木 カグヤ, Ōtsutsuki Kaguya) is the central underlying antagonist of the Naruto series and a member of the main family of the Ōtsutsuki clan. Betraying her partner Isshiki Ōtsutsuki after they planted a Divine Tree on the world, Kaguya decided to keep the world for herself and ate the Divine Tree's fruit to awaken her Rinne Sharigan and subject the world to the Infinite Tsukuyomi to end all conflict.^{[ch. 646]} While Kaguya was revered as the "Rabbit Goddess" (卯の女神, Usagi no Megami), Kaguya was consumed by her power and eventually lost trust in humanity while converting humans assimilated by the Divine Tree into her personal army of White Zetsu as a defense against her kinsmen. This and the other horrifying acts that Kaguya committed resulted in the then-powerless people to denounce her as a "Demon" (鬼, Oni). Later learning that some of her chakra passed on into her sons, Hagoromo and Hamura, Kaguya attempts to reclaim that power by merging into the Divine Tree and regress it into the Ten-Tails (十尾, Jūbi). Hagoromo, aided by his brother Hamura, managed to defeat the monster and seal him in his body, becoming the first jinchūriki. Shortly before dying, the Sage decided to divide the demon's chakra into nine parts and, through a technique known as "perfect Izanagi" of Yin-Yang, he gave birth to the bodies of the nine tailed beasts into which she infused all of her mother's chakra. She eventually sealed the Ten-Tails' soulless body with the Chibaku Tensei, trapping him in an enormous mass of rocks, which would later be known as the Moon. But Kaguya created Black Zetsu at the last second to orchestrate her return by influencing Hagoromo's eldest son Indra and the Uchiha Clan. Having successfully manipulated Madara Uchiha into eventually casting the Infinite Tsukuyomi while having the Ten-Tails corpse absorbed by the Uchiha, Black Zetsu betrays Madara and converts him into a vessel for Kaguya to inhabit. From there, deeming Naruto and Sasuke a threat because they are the current reincarnations of her grandsons and because of their resemblance to her own children, Kaguya takes Team 7 and Obito into her dimensional realms to kill them there. But after being overpowered by Naruto and Sasuke with Sakura preventing her escape, Kaguya is resealed with the tailed beasts and Madara extracted from her body.^{[ch. 646, 647]} Kaguya is voiced by Mami Koyama in Japanese and by Cissy Jones in the English dub.

==== Momoshiki Ōtsutsuki ====
Momoshiki Ōtsutsuki (大筒木 モモシキ, Ōtsutsuki Momoshiki) is one of the two main antagonists of Boruto: Naruto the Movie and a member of the main family of the Ōtsutsuki clan, intending a planet new Divine Tree as the one his faction used to harvest a previous planet's resources is dying. Momoshiki possesses both a pair of Byakugan and Rinnegan, the latter located on his palms, which he uses to absorb and release ninjutsu. He also consumes red pills that enhances his abilities. Targeting the Tailed Beasts for their chakra, attacking Killer Bee prior, Momoshiki and his partner Kinshiki come to Konohagakure with the objective of capturing Kurama from Naruto. The two manage to abduct Naruto to their dimension after destroying the Chunin Exams stadium, but before they could finish the extraction process, the pair are confronted by Boruto, Sasuke, and the four Kage. Overwhelmed, Momoshiki consumes a makeshift red pill from Kinshiki's body, making him even stronger with another Rinnegan appearing on his forehead. Though ultimately killed by Naruto and Boruto's combined Rasengan, in Part I of the Boruto series makes Momoshiki's final moments to isolate Boruto within frozen time and brand him with the Kama mark so he can take the boy as his new vessel. Momoshiki's attempts to take over Boruto's body become grave enough that Boruto asked Kawaki to kill him so he can stop Momoshiki for good. Momoshiki is voiced by Daisuke Namikawa in Japanese and by Xander Mobus in the English dub.

==== Kinshiki Ōtsutsuki ====
Kinshiki Ōtsutsuki (大筒木 キンシキ, Ōtsutsuki Kinshiki) is one of the two main antagonists of Boruto: Naruto the Movie. He is Momoshiki's obedient subordinate and a member of the main family of the Ōtsutsuki clan. As with his master, Kinshiki was a member of his clan who came to Earth to steal the tailed beasts' chakra. Having managed to kidnap Naruto for Kurama's extraction, the pair are confronted by a group of ninja arriving to rescue Naruto. Realizing that they are overwhelmed, Kinshiki breaks through his binding by the Kage and turns himself into a red pill for his master to consume, enhancing the latter's powers although Momoshiki is soon killed. Kinshiki is voiced by Hiroki Yasumoto in Japanese and by Wally Wingert in the English dub.

==== Urashiki Ōtsutsuki ====
Urashiki Ōtsutsuki (大筒木ウラシキ, Ōtsutsuki Urashiki) is the main antagonist of the Boruto: Naruto Next Generations anime series and a member of the main family of the Ōtsutsuki clan, able to siphon chakra with his fishing rod. He joins Momoshiki and Kinshiki on their mission to gather the chakra of the God Tree on Earth, sent ahead of the two to investigate Kaguya's disappearance and subdues Toneri when he attempts to stop him. After Momoshiki and Kinshiki were defeated, Urashiki acts on his own to target the tailed beast chakra by first going after Shukaku. When that failed he learned of the Leaf possess his clan's time travel relic Karasuki and decides to go after Naruto when he was trained by Jiraiya past, only for Boruto and Sasuke to follow after him. In the end, Urashiki is killed by Boruto and past Naruto. Urashiki is voiced by Kazuya Nakai in Japanese and by Benjamin Diskin in the English dub.

==== Isshiki Ōtsutsuki ====
Isshiki Ōtsutsuki (大筒木イッシキ, Ōtsutsuki Isshiki) is the primary antagonist of Part I of the Boruto series and a high rank member of the main family of the Ōtsutsuki clan. Originally coming to Earth with Kaguya for the fruit of a Divine Tree their clan planted on the planet, Isshiki was fatally wounded by Kaguya in an act of betrayal. He was found by a novice monk named Jigen and took over his body in order to survive, placing a Kāma onto his host. But Isshiki began to prepare a new host as Jigen's body wouldn't be able to bear his chakra and founded Kara to create a new Divine Tree in order to obtain the chakra fruit. He also possesses a dojutsu which can use Sukunahikona (ability to shrink or grow an object to any size). Using Jigen's guise, he becomes the founder of the Kara organization to search for a suitable Vessel, eventually ending up with a failed Vessel in Code, and a successful one with Kawaki. After Naruto takes Kawaki in, Isshiki powers up by taking chakra from a captive Ten-Tails and arrives in the Leaf. Naruto refuses to give Kawaki up, so he takes the Hokage away to another dimension. Sasuke Uchiha arrives, having tracked him to Kara's dimension. The two go all-out and push the body of Jigen to his limits; but in the end Isshiki decisively beats them both, sealing Naruto away. After Team 7 rescues Naruto from Boro, a member of Kara, Isshiki is attacked by Koji Kashin; a member of Kara. Though Koji took advantage of Jigen's weakened state, he is overwhelmed after killing the body of Jigen, which forces Isshiki's revival in his weak body. Isshiki destroys Koji, after discovering that he is a clone of Jiraiya created by Amado, his most trusted confidant in Kara. Isshiki comes to the Leaf to re-mark Kawaki, before his time could run out in the failed vessel of Jigen. Naruto and Sasuke arrive to fight him, after his initial destruction. Sasuke unveils his plan, made with Boruto, as the latter uses his Karma to teleport Isshiki to another dimension. Furious, Isshiki effortlessly beats Naruto and gravely injures Sasuke, before maiming Boruto. After attempting to kidnap Boruto to use for his plan, Naruto arrives, in the Baryon Mode and fights on even terms with Isshiki. His lifespan shortened to five minutes, Isshiki grows desperate, but discovers that the beaten Naruto has a chakra link with Kawaki. He successfully teleports the boy to the battlefield and rebrands him. As he begins turning to dust, Kawaki reveals that he only branded his Shadow Clone, and he stomps Isshiki to dust. Afterwards, Isshiki's soul entrusts Code with a Ten-Tails to continue his work. He is voiced by Kenjiro Tsuda, and by Keith Silverstein in the English dub.

=== Kara ===
Kara (殻; lit. Husk) is an organization of ninja that serves as the primary antagonistic force of Part I of the Boruto series. While much of their history is yet unknown, they are interested in those with Forbidden Jutsu, like Boruto, and seek out a "vessel" for their goals. Kara's leadership are known as the Inners (内陣インナー, Innā), each in charge of a particular region with a Roman Numeral tattooed on their faces. They use sleeper agents known as Outers (外陣アウトー, Autō) to serve them in a variety of ways.

- Jigen (ジゲン): Kara's leader and an Inner who uses Genjutsu to communicate with the other Inners, and bears a Roman numeral of four tattoo under his left eye. He is a fierce Taijutsu who possesses the ability to bestow Kama marks on others and can access the abilities of Isshiki Ōtsutsuki, whom he a Vessel of. He eventually dies later in the series, letting Isshiki fully reincarnate into his body. He is voiced by Kenjiro Tsuda in the Japanese dub, and by Keith Silverstein in the English dub.
- Amado Sanzu (三途アマド): The genius Inner who created Kara's cyborgs and serves as head scientist for Jigen, later revealed to be his enemy, as he sends Koji to assassinate him and defecting to Konoha. He also reactivates Delta as an ally of the Leaf, after her initial deactivation by him. As Amado's role in the Leaf and the threat of Code increases, he reveals that Delta is a faulty clone of his deceased daughter, Akebi, who died from an illness. He also tells the Leaf the history of Shibai Ōtsutsuki, a being considered a god even within the clan of Ōtsutsuki itself. His godlike abilities, called shinjutsu is what Amado harnessed for his cyborgs that were greater than Jigen, such as Eida and Daemon. Amado is voiced by Akio Ōtsuka in the Japanese dub and by Greg Chun in the English dub.
- Code (コード, Kōdo): A young Inner with ginger hair and the tattoo of the Roman numeral six. He is revealed to be a defective Vessel of Isshiki, as he has a White Karma, which is only usable as a weapon, granting him the ability to use Claw Marks as a means of transportation, as well as immense physical boosts. Following Isshiki's demise, he releases EIda and Daemon, to cyborgs created by Amado to be stronger than Jigen, but their alliance is cut short, due to Eida's attraction to Kawaki and they soon turn on him. Ending up alone once more, Code aims to use the juvenile Ten-Tails Isshiki left him as a weapon. However, Code's modifications on the Ten-Tails made it sapient and turn on him as the Divine Trees. He is voiced by Junta Terashima in the Japanese dub and by Jacob Hopkins in the English dub.
- Delta (デルタ, Deruta): A female Inner with a destructive temper whose heavily modified body allows her to fight nearly on equal footing against Naruto when she attempts to retrieve Kawaki, bearing the Roman numeral of one tattooed on her forehead. After Naruto destroys her body, her drone returns to Kara base and activates a new body. When Amado leaves the organization, he deactivates her body, but he later on reprograms her as an ally of the Leaf. After Amado's defection, it is revealed that Delta is basically a faulty clone of his deceased daughter, with a personality of her own. Delta is voiced by Houko Kuwashima in the Japanese dub and by Amber Lee Connors in the English dub.
- Koji Kashin (果心居士, Kashin Koji): A masked Inner who assigned his sleeper agent Ao to retrieve Kawaki. He possesses the Fire-Style jutsu True Fire of Samadhi, which creates flames hot enough to negate an opponent's regeneration, and can use both Toad summoning jutsu and the Rasengan. Koji is sent to retrieve Kawaki, which he leaves to the Outers Ao and Garo. He infiltrates the Leaf Village, and surveys Kawaki at the Uzumaki house for a long time. He is able to view the fight between Jigen, Naruto and Sasuke and picks his moment for an assassination attempt, on Amado's orders. During his fight with Jigen, it is revealed that Koji is a clone of Jiraya created by Amado. Three years later, Koji joined forces with Boruto Uzumaki to help him achieve his goals. Koji Kashin is voiced by Yūichi Nakamura in the Japanese dub and by Kaiji Tang in the English dub.
- Boro (ボロ, Boro): A brutish Inner with the Roman numeral of three tattooed on his face. He is the leader of a cult dedicated to the veneration of the Ōtsutsuki and the Infinite Tsukuyomi. In reality, he used the cult to kidnap children suitable to become vessels for Isshiki. After Naruto is sailed away by Isshiki, Boro guards it. Team 7 shows up to save Naruto, but Boro makes their task very difficult, due to his perceived immortal body. Sarada sees through his weakness, and destroys the Scientific Ninja Tool within his body, which healed it and kept it under wraps. Boro loses control and gravely injures all of Team 7, before Momoshiki Ōtsutsuki awakens within the body of his Vessel, Boruto. Momoshiki absorbs some chakra from the unconscious Naruto and disintegrates Boro completely. Boro is voiced by Kenta Miyake in the Japanese dub and by Dave B. Mitchell in the English dub.
- Victor (ヴィクタ, Vikuta): A crippled, elderly Inner with the Roman numeral of five tattooed on the left side of his forehead. He is a veteran of the Fourth Great Ninja War, after which he emigrated to the Land of Valleys, where he started a huge company, working with Scientific Ninja Tools. He and his partner Deepa attempt to create their own God Tree, and he sacrifices most of the company workers for his God Tree. Though he is strong, and able to use all five basic chakra natures, Orochimaru and Konohamaru work together to defeat him. Later on, he tries stealing Kawaki for himself, but Koji Kashin kills him on Jigen's orders. He is voiced by Chō in the Japanese dub and by Doug Stone in the English dub.
- Deepa (ディーパ, Dīpa): A fearsome and cruel Inner with the Roman numeral of seven tattooed on his face. He possesses the unique jutsu of creating super-dense carbon, which he can use as thick armor, or projectiles of different sizes and shapes. He murders Omoi's teammates, as well as the Haze ninjas, on his pursuit of retrieving the Hashirama cell from Team 7. Though Boruto, Sarada and Mitsuki give it their all, Deepa is unfazed by their greatest attacks as he beats them. Mitsuki uses his Sage Mode to save his teammates, which results in the failure of several of his organs. While Boruto and Sarada train to become stronger and Mitsuki recovers, During Victor's recreation of the God Tree, Boruto and Sarada arrive to fight him. Deepa dominates, until Mitsuki arrives to even the fields. Through their combined chakra, Boruto is able to destroy his ultimate armor with a Sage Jutsu Super Compressed Rasengan, and he is then crushed by boulders. Later, Amado resurrects his head, in order for Jigen to learn of Victor's betrayal, after which point Jigen orders his disposal permanently. He is voiced by Tetsuya Kakihara in the Japanese dub and by Chris Hackney in the English dub.
- Ouga (オウガ, Ōga): A highly intelligent and deceptive young Inner with the Roman numeral of eight tattooed on her forehead. She is an unusual cyborg even among the Inners themselves, as Amado used Scientific Ninja Tool enhancements to greatly boost her mental capabilities, instead of physical prowess, since he needed an assistant in the lab, during his research about the human heart and soul. Due to her curious nature, she attempted to study Jigen's heart, at which point Jigen removed a part of her brain and exiled her. While her body breaks down as she is held in stasis, she uses a puppet and genjutsu to capture people and place them in a genjutsu world of traps, to somehow regain her desire to live through them, since she also participates under a false identity, Yatsume. After one of her captives, Boruto breaks through the genjutsu and inspires her, she regains her purpose and sets everyone free, while escaping. She is voiced by Sara Matsumoto and the decoy old man puppet she used is voiced by Kappei Yamaguchi and by Ray Chase in the English dub.
- Eida (エイダ, Eida): a female cyborg and Daemon's elder sister, created by Amado to be stronger than Jigen, she is adept at taijutsu, while also possessing the Senrigan, an eye which allows her to predict future outcomes and make everyone on Earth, except members of the Ōtsutsuki clan and their Vessels fall in love with her. During Code's initial attack of Naruto Uzumaki, Eida and Daemon turn on Code, because he attempted to kill Kawaki as he was protecting Naruto at the time. Since there is no known way to resist her charms, or counter Daemons's ability yet, they are granted asylum in the Leaf village. She is voiced by Kana Hanazawa in the Japanese dub and Anairis Quiñones in the English dub.
- Daemon (ダイモン, Daimon): a cyborg child and Eida's little brother, created by Amado as a weapon against Jigen. He is an incredibly powerful taijutsu user, with the ability to reflect an opponent's attack back at them or someone else, provided he touches them while they attack. During Code's initial attack of Naruto Uzumaki, Eida and Daemon turn on Code, because he attempted to kill Kawaki as he was protecting Naruto at the time. Since there is no known way to resist Eida's charms, or counter his ability yet, they are granted asylum in the Leaf village. He is voiced by Yumiri Hanamori in the Japanese dub and AJ Beckles in the English dub.

=== Divine Trees ===
The Divine Trees (神樹, Shinju; lit. God Tree) are humanoid creatures that serve as the primary antagonistic force of Part II of the Boruto series. They were originally a juvenile Ten-Tails that Isshiki kept in another dimension before it came into the possession of Code, using his ability to create Claw Grimes (爪アカ, Tsumeaka) from fragments of its flesh to serve as his personal army to attack Boruto and his friends with. But the Claw Grimes start attacking people for their chakra and transmitting it to the main body, causing the Ten-Tails to develop a consciousness and breaks free while splintering itself in the form of a quartet in the image of those whose chakra was absorbed by the Claw Grimes. The Divine Trees explain they evolved passed their need to feed on an Ōtsutsuki to fully mature, instead seeking knowledge while preying on the loved ones of those they resemble.

- Jūra (十羅): The supportive and composed leader of the group who selected the Nine Tails Jinchuriki as his prey, assuming it to be Naruto before meeting Himawari.
- Hidari (左): A Divine Tree who assumed Sasuke's appearance and mannerisms, selecting Sarada as his prey.
- Matsuri (祭): A Divine Tree who assumed Moegi's appearance and mannerisms, selecting Konohamaru as her prey.
- Mamushi (虫): A Divine Tree who assumed the appearance of a Kara Outer named Bug, eventually selecting Eida as his prey.
- Ryū (粒): A Divine Tree who assumed Shinki's appearance and mannerisms, selecting Gaara as his prey.

== Supporting characters ==
=== Iruka Umino ===
Iruka Umino (うみの イルカ, Umino Iruka) is a Konohagakure chunin and instructor at the Ninja Academy, a school for prospective ninja. Masashi Kishimoto's initial design of Iruka featured "evil" eyes and sharper cheekbones, but this was abandoned in favor of a more relaxed appearance.^{[vol. 2:126]} When Iruka was a child, his parents were killed by Kurama, the Nine-Tailed Fox which was later sealed with the Yang part into Naruto Uzumaki and the Yin part into Minato Namikaze. At the start of the series, he often found it awkward around Naruto, but after Naruto was targeted for death by Iruka's friend Mizuki, Iruka became the first person who acknowledged Naruto, and they ultimately saved each other against Mizuki.^{[ch. 1]} The Third Hokage chose Iruka as Naruto's sensei on purpose because of their similar backgrounds. Naruto thinks of Iruka as a father-figure because of the fight against Mizuki,^{[ch. 232]} and Iruka, in turn, has immense faith in Naruto's potential to be a great ninja. During the Fourth Great Ninja War, Iruka is dispatched by the Allied Shinobi Forces to stop Naruto from leaving the island where he and Killer Bee are being kept safe. However, upon finding out that he was deceived, Naruto abandons Iruka, but Iruka slips Naruto a good luck note into his headband, restoring their mutual faith.^{[ch. 535]} In the final episode of Naruto: Shippuden, Naruto asks Iruka to stand in as his father for his wedding. In Boruto: Naruto Next Generations He has become the headmaster of the Leaf Village Ninja Academy. In the Japanese anime, his voice actor is Toshihiko Seki, and his English voice actor is Quinton Flynn in the Naruto and Naruto Shippuden series and Kyle McCarley at the end of the Naruto Shippuden series and Boruto: Naruto Next Generations.

=== Hokage ===
The term Hokage (火影; lit. "Fire Shadow") refers to the title of the leader of Konohagakure. Over the course of the series, there have been eight Hokage, who are honored by the village through carving their likenesses into the rock formation overlooking Konohagakure, although the Eighth Hokage's face is not carved into the mountain. The First Hokage is Hashirama Senju, founder of the village along with Madara Uchiha. The First is succeeded by his younger brother, Tobirama Senju, the Second Hokage who creates Konoha's government system and attempts to keep Uchiha clan members from ending up like Madara. He, in turn, is followed by one of his students, Hiruzen Sarutobi, who becomes the Third Hokage. After a long rule, the Third abdicates in favor of Minato Namikaze, who takes the position of Fourth Hokage, but reclaims his position after the Fourth gave his life to save the village from Kurama, the Nine-Tailed Fox.^{[ch. 1]} Hiruzen is the Hokage at the beginning of the series, but he dies in battle with his former student, Orochimaru, during an invasion of Konohagakure.^{[ch. 137]} One of Hiruzen's students and also Hashirama's granddaughter Tsunade Senju, succeeds him as the Fifth Hokage, becoming also the first and only female Hokage.^{[ch. 172]} Danzo Shimura follows Tsunade, becoming the unofficial leader of Konoha, the candidate Sixth Hokage, after Tsunade enters a coma as a consequence of defending the village from Pain. Before Danzo took office, he ultimately committed suicide after losing a battle against Sasuke Uchiha. Kakashi Hatake was considered to be the Sixth Hokage until Tsunade awakened from her coma, at which point she resumes her duty.^{[ch. 489]} After the Fourth Great Ninja War, Tsunade abdicates in favor of Kakashi, who becomes the Sixth Hokage for many years until Naruto Uzumaki succeeds him as the Seventh Hokage. After the presumed death of Naruto by Kawaki, Shikamaru Nara becomes the Eighth Hokage.

==== Hashirama Senju ====
Hashirama Senju (千手 柱間, Senju Hashirama), the First Hokage (初代火影, Shodai Hokage) was the co-founder of the first ninja village, Konohagakure, and the former leader of Senju Clan. He is a respected ninja of his era and is known as the "God of Shinobi" (忍の神, Shinobi no Kami). The only naturally born user of Wood Style techniques, Hashirama is also an incarnation of Asura Ōtsutsuki.^{[ch. 120, 671]} Despite experiencing the Warring States period firsthand, Hashirama has a cheerful and happy-go-lucky personality with a desire to end the conflict. As a child, Hashirama forged a friendship with Madara Uchiha before the youth declared them enemies, and they battle on occasion with Hashirama eventually convincing Madara to have their clans make peace while finding Konoha.^{[ch. 399]} He later dies through many wars of his era, though is brought back by the Reanimation Jutsu twice by Orochimaru^{[ch. 118]}; the first of which to battle his former student Hiruzen,^{[ch. 120]} while the second to help Sasuke understand Konoha's history before battling the reanimated Madara in the new war. He manages to make amends with his former friend as the latter lays dying following Kaguya's defeat, and Hashirama is put to rest after helping to transport Team 7 from Kaguya's dimension back to Earth. In the Japanese anime, he is voiced by Takayuki Sugō while Yuki Tai voices him as a child. In the English version, Hashirama is voiced by Jamieson Price in Part I, Peter Lurie in Part II, and JB Blanc in some video games, with Max Mittelman voicing him as a child.

==== Tobirama Senju ====
Tobirama Senju (千手 扉間, Senju Tobirama), the Second Hokage (二代目火影, Nidaime Hokage), is the younger brother of Hashirama and the teacher of Hiruzen Sarutobi. He is credited as being the Hokage who created the infrastructure of Konohagakure, including the Ninja Academy, Police Force, and the Anbu Black Ops. He is considered as the most powerful Water Style user and is known throughout the Ninja World for creating the Flying Thunder God Jutsu (飛雷神の術, Hiraishin no Jutsu), the Shadow Clone Jutsu, and the controversial Reanimation Jutsu, although he abandoned its completion due to its sinister nature.^{[ch. 520]} He has high knowledge of the Uchiha anatomy and source of their power. In flashbacks, he disapproves of Hashirama's friendship with Madara Uchiha even after the rival clans had reconciled, eventually leading to Madara's departure. Tobirama's time as Hokage is short-lived as, during the First Great Ninja War, he sacrifices himself to let his team, which included Hiruzen Sarutobi and Danzo Shimura, successfully retreat after being surrounded by enemy forces during a mission.^{[ch. 501]} He is later brought back years later by the Reanimation Jutsu after it was perfected by Orochimaru and forced to battle Hiruzen, ultimately losing and being sealed away by the Reaper Death Seal.^{[ch. 118]} Tobirama is later brought back again to inform Sasuke Uchiha about the Uchiha Clan and to participate in the battle against the Ten Tails. He and the other resurrected Hokage are put to rest after Kaguya's defeat. In the Japanese anime, he is voiced by Kenyū Horiuchi while Kengo Kawanishi voices him as a child. In the English version, Tobirama is voiced by Peter Lurie in Part I, Jamieson Price in Part II, and Steven Blum in some video games, with Benjamin Diskin voicing him as a child.

==== Hiruzen Sarutobi ====
Hiruzen Sarutobi (猿飛 ヒルゼン, Sarutobi Hiruzen), the Third Hokage (三代目火影, Sandaime Hokage), has been the longest-ruling Hokage, being forced to return to duty after the death of the Fourth Hokage, Minato Namikaze. He is a peace-loving leader, preferring nonviolent discussions to his advisers' more militaristic suggestions. Throughout the series, he acts as a source of wisdom to younger generations; and from the start, is one of the few characters to treat Naruto Uzumaki as a person rather than a mere host of Kurama.^{[ch. 2]} He was admired as the God of Shinobi in his prime,^{[ch. 121]} and also known as "The Professor" (プロフェッサー, Purofessā), as he purportedly knew every jutsu in Konohagakure.^{[ch. 121]} He is able to use the Summoning Jutsu, which allows him to summon the Monkey King: Enma (猿猴王・猿魔, Enkōō: Enma), who takes the form of a long rod when not summoned.^{[ch. 120]} He is also the teacher of the Three Legendary Sannin Jiraiya, Orochimaru, and Tsunade. Orochimaru is his favorite student, and Sarutobi could never bring himself to recognize Orochimaru's evil qualities. When Orochimaru invades Konoha years later, Sarutobi fights him to repent for never prosecuting Orochimaru as he should have.^{[ch. 121]} While he is unable to seal Orochimaru with the forbidden Death Seal, Hiruzen still manages to rob Orochimaru of his ability to use Jutsu by sealing his arms, thus bringing an end to the invasion and allowing him to die happily.^{[ch. 137]} During the Fourth Great Ninja War, Orochimaru releases Hiruzen's soul from the Death Seal and reanimates him so Sasuke can confirm the events behind the Uchiha Clan Massacre. He later participates in the battle against Obito and Madara alongside the other resurrected Hokage, before being put to rest following Kaguya's defeat. In the Japanese anime, he is voiced by Hidekatsu Shibata, and his English voice actor is Steve Kramer.

==== Minato Namikaze ====
Minato Namikaze (波風 ミナト, Namikaze Minato), the Fourth Hokage (四代目火影, Yondaime Hokage), is Naruto Uzumaki's father and Kushina's husband. Although Naruto and Minato are noted to have a number of similar physical traits throughout the series, their familial relationship is not revealed until Part II of the series.^{[ch. 367]} He was the student of Jiraiya and the teacher of Kakashi Hatake, Obito Uchiha, and Rin Nohara. The entire village respects Minato as a hero of the village, having perfected Tobirama's Flying Thunder God Jutsu, a method of teleportation with pre-made seals, to earn the title of "Konoha's Yellow Flash" (木ノ葉の黄色い閃光, Konoha no Kiiroi Senkō).^{[ch. 240]} Before the start of the series, after battling the mysterious masked ninja who released the Nine-Tails Kurama, Minato siphons Kurama's Yin chakra to weaken the Tailed Beast to be sealed into Naruto's body in a sacrificial act so that only his son can access Kurama's Yang chakra.^{[ch. 2]} Years later, during the Fourth Great Ninja War, Orochimaru releases Minato's soul and reanimates him. Minato and the other Hokage decide to fight alongside Sasuke on the battlefield and defeat Madara Uchiha. Minato reveals his own Nine-Tails Chakra Mode which he later tries to pass to his son. During a battle against Madara, he soon realized that Obito is in fact alive all along and that he was the masked man that was behind Kurama's attack on the Hidden Leaf Village during Naruto's birth. Once the battle is over, Minato is released from the Reanimation Jutsu by Hagoromo and promises Naruto that he will tell Kushina of their son's progress. Kishimoto has expressed desire to make a spin-off series with a younger Minato as the protagonist. In the Japanese anime, Minato is voiced by Toshiyuki Morikawa with Miyu Irino voicing him as a child. In the English version, his voice actor is Tony Oliver. In 2023, on the occasion of the global poll held for the 20th anniversary of the manga, Minato Namikaze was found to be the most popular character of the franchise.

==== Tsunade Senju ====
Tsunade Senju (千手 綱手, Senju Tsunade), as well as her former teammates Jiraiya and Orochimaru, is a former student of Hiruzen Sarutobi.^{[ch. 170]} Despite looking like a beautiful and buxom woman in her twenties, Tsunade is actually an older woman in her fifties who uses a transformation technique to maintain her youthful appearance.^{[ch. 149]} Tsunade is also the granddaughter of the First Hokage Hashirama Senju and Mito Uzumaki with many referring to her by the Japanese honorific "hime" (princess). Despite her connections to the first three Hokage, Tsunade hates the position when she is first introduced. After her boyfriend Dan Katō and brother Nawaki Senju die in pursuit of their dreams to become Hokage, she loses faith in the title and the concept of dreams. She regains her faith in both after meeting Naruto Uzumaki, who consistently overcomes any obstacle in his own dreams of being Hokage.^{[ch. 172]} As a result, Tsunade accepts the position of Fifth Hokage (五代目火影, Godaime Hokage) to protect Konohakagure on behalf of everyone she has loved,^{[ch. 169]} also later taking Sakura as her apprentice, much like Orochimaru with Sasuke and Jiraiya with Naruto. By the end of the series, Tsunade retires at the end of the Fourth Great Ninja War and bestows the Hokage title to Kakashi. She is last seen in the epilogue attending a meeting with other recent Kage that have also retired.

Despite the importance of her position, Tsunade tends to laze around and avoid her everyday duties, instead leaving them for her assistant Shizune. She does however take her role very seriously in situations where Konoha is in danger, and throughout Part II leads the village in combating the Akatsuki.^{[ch. 238]} Tsunade is a compulsive gambler with terrible luck, though with a rare winning streak perceived by her as a bad omen. Despite her odd personality, Tsunade is a highly talented medical ninja who can heal injuries that most others would consider incurable, and also possesses superhuman strength that allows her to reduce buildings to rubble. The pinnacle of her skills is the Creation Rebirth jutsu and its derived technique, the Strength of a Hundred Technique, which she taught to her disciple Sakura. This way, both Tsunade and Sakura use mitotic regeneration to make them nearly unkillable in battle. In the Japanese anime, Tsunade's voice actress is Masako Katsuki, and her English voice actress is Debi Mae West. In some of the video games, however, her English voice actress is Mary Elizabeth McGlynn, starting from Naruto: Ultimate Ninja 2 to Naruto Shippuden: Ultimate Ninja 4, Naruto: Ultimate Ninja Heroes 2 and only Naruto: Ultimate Ninja Storm 1.

=== Jiraiya ===
Jiraiya (自来也) was a Konohagakure ninja, being not only Naruto Uzumaki's teacher but also Minato Namikaze's teacher. Kishimoto has commented that out of all master-pupil relationships he has created in the Naruto series, the bond between Naruto and Jiraiya is his favorite, noting that it makes drawing them "worthwhile". As a child, Jiraiya was under the tutelage of Hiruzen Sarutobi, along with his teammates, Tsunade and Orochimaru.^{[ch. 170]} Jiraiya is known throughout the Naruto world as the "Toad Sage" (蝦蟇仙人, Gama Sennin) due to his toad-related jutsu and knowledge of Sage Jutsu. Prior to Naruto, Jiraiya also trained other pupils like Minato and Nagato due to a prophecy he heard that his pupil would be great man. Although still affiliated with Konoha, Jiraiya is usually traveling to watch over potential threats to his home. Jiraiya's personality is openly lecherous, proudly describes himself as a "super pervert" while authoring a series of best-selling adult romance novels.^{[ch. 91]} He also wrote the epic "Tale of the Gutsy Ninja", with Naruto named after its protagonist. During Part I, he takes Naruto as his student, and returns him to Konoha in Part II before leaving to investigate the Akatsuki. However, finding Nagato leading the organization, Jiraiya dies fighting his former student's Paths of Pain while sending a message to the village, believing to have done enough for Naruto.^{[ch. 245]} In the Japanese anime, Jiraiya is voiced by Hōchū Ōtsuka, with Toru Nara voicing him as a child. His English voice actor is David Lodge, with Brad MacDonald voicing him as a child; Richard Cansino and Wally Wingert also voice him in some video games.

=== Anko Mitarashi ===
Anko Mitarashi (みたらしアンコ, Mitarashi Anko) is a kunoichi from Konohagakure and a classmate of Team Minato's. She was assigned to a team under the tutelage of Orochimaru. The two became fond of each other, and Orochimaru ultimately decided to give Anko some of his research. However, this resulted in Anko being the only survivor of ten Cursed Seal subjects, and also develop various snake-like abilities.^{[ch. 50]} After Orochimaru abandoned his village, Anko blamed herself and made it her personal goal to eliminate him. At the start of the series, she is a loud, brash tokubetsu jonin and the proctor of the second part of the Chunin Exams. After prematurely arriving to take the examinees to the Forest of Death, she ends up frightening Naruto when he complains about her "exaggerations" of the forest.^{[ch. 45]} She also fights Orochimaru in the forest alone when she discovers he is in there. During Part II, Anko is sent by the Allied Shinobi Forces to find and locate Kabuto. However, Kabuto ends up defeating her in battle, and uses her Cursed Seal to fuel his Reanimation Jutsu while she is unconscious. Sasuke and the Taka later find her and uses her Cursed Seal to release Orochimaru, causing the Cursed Seal to be cured. In the epilogue, Anko is an instructor at the academy, having become rather fat.^{[ch. 700]} In Japanese, Anko is voiced by Takako Honda. In the English dub, she is voiced by Julianne Buescher until Episode 169, when Laura Bailey takes over; Anko is also voiced by Kari Wahlgren in Naruto: Ultimate Ninja 3 and is also voiced by Cherami Leigh in Boruto: Naruto Next Generations.

=== Shizune ===
Shizune (シズネ) is a Konohagakure ninja introduced in the series as Tsunade's assistant. She leaves Konohagakure with Tsunade after the death of Tsunade's boyfriend, Dan Katō, and Tsunade teaches her medical techniques over their years away from the village. Many of her attacks in the series are poison-based, including using concealed poisoned needles or emitting toxic gas from her mouth.^{[ch. 166]} In Part II of the series, Shizune's concern for details causes her to question Tsunade's judgment, creating interference with Tsunade's plans and temporarily straining the relationship between the two.^{[ch. 282]} During Pain's attack on Konohagakure, Shizune is briefly killed when her soul is stripped away as the Human Path interrogates her about Naruto's whereabouts,^{[ch. 429]} though she is revived at the end of the invasion.^{[ch. 449]} She continues to serve as the Hokage's personal assistant well over into Naruto's leadership as the Seventh Hokage in the series epilogue.^{[ch. 449]} In the Japanese anime, her voice actress is Keiko Nemoto, and her English voice actress is Megan Hollingshead.

=== Killer Bee ===
Killer Bee (キラービー, Kirābī) is a ninja from the village of Kumogakure and the Jinchuriki of Gyūki—the Eight-Tails.^{[ch. 411]} He is also the adopted brother of Ay, the Fourth Raikage, and as such, is expected to be the guardian of the village.^{[ch. 541]} In battle, he uses its great strength to increase the lethality of his professional wrestling-styled attacks,^{[ch. 413]} something Kishimoto's former editor proposed. He is also a talented swordsman, capable of using up to seven swords at once and to execute attacks unpredictable enough to render Sasuke's Sharingan useless.^{[ch. 411]} When the Akatsuki attacks him, he pretends to be captured to escape at the cost of losing some of Gyūki's chakra and pursue a career as an enka music singer.^{[ch. 419]}^{[ch. 537]} However, Killer Bee is brought back to Kumogakure, playing a role in teaching Naruto how to control Kurama's power. He also becomes Naruto's primary partner in the war against the Akatsuki after gaining his brother's approval to fight alongside him, eventually losing Gyūki to Madara.^{[ch. 544]} However, Killer Bee survived the extracting by holding on to a piece of Gyūki's tentacle and becomes the Eight Tails Jinchuriki again in the aftermath of the war. In the Boruto anime series, Killer Bee was attacked by Otsutsuki clansmen with his fate currently unknown following the Eight Tails chakra being extracted from him. Despite the difficulties in making his lines, as he always speaks in rhymes, Kishimoto wishes to make him a rich character. His voice actor in the Japanese anime is Hisao Egawa, and his English voice actor is Catero Colbert.

=== Hagoromo Otsutsuki ===
Hagoromo Ōtsutsuki (大筒木ハゴロモ, Ōtsutsuki Hagoromo), known as "The Sage of Six Paths" (六道仙人, Rikudō Sennin), and his twin brother Hamura are the sons of Kaguya. Having unintentionality inherited fragments of the Shinju's chakra while in their mother's womb, Hagoromo and Hamura ended up fighting Kaguya upon learning the truth of the utopia they were born into. After the brothers defeated Kaguya following her transformation into the Ten-Tails, Hagoromo become the first jinchūriki and use the chakra to establish a practice known as ninshu, which eventually evolved into ninjutsu to his dismay, Hagoromo started a family while considering an heir to his legacy between his sons, Asura and Indra. While Indra was naturally gifted and self-reliant, Hagoromo ultimately decided on Asura due to his ability to befriend others and peaceful ideologies. This would cause a rift between the brothers, Hagoromo unaware of Black Zetsu's role in turning Indra against his family. Hagoromo later uses the last of his strength to create the Tailed Beasts before dying and seal the body of the Ten-Tails into the moon. Despite his death, Hagoromo's spirit observed Asura and Indra throughout their reincarnations, including Hashirama and Madara, before his sons' current incarnations as Naruto and Sasuke. During the Fourth Great Ninja War, realizing Madara's intentions, Hagoromo intervenes to give Naruto and Sasuke the power to defeat Kaguya and later bringing Team 7 back from Kaguya's dimension with the deceased Kage. Hagoromo eventually departs as Naruto and Sasuke proceed in their final duel. Hagoromo is voiced by Mitsutaka Tachikawa in Japanese and Michael McConnohie in the English dub for anime until Shippuden episode 463, where he was replaced by Doug Stone, while in game version voiced by Fred Tatasciore in Naruto Shippuden: Ultimate Ninja Storm 4 and his younger self was voiced by Keith Silverstein.

=== Himawari Uzumaki ===
Himawari Uzumaki (うずまき ヒマワリ, Uzumaki Himawari) is the second child of Naruto Uzumaki and Hinata Hyuga, inheriting the latter's hair along with her father's blue eyes. She also inherits her maternal family's Byakugan, which allows her to do the Gentle Fist technique capable of blocking the target's chakra points with one hit, although she only activates them when she is angry. Like her mother, Himawari is kind-hearted and is fond of her brother Boruto even though he has a fear of her if Himawari actives Byakugan, though she has a temper like her late-paternal grandmother that terrifies Boruto if she is pushed too hard. One such moment resulted in Himawari accidentally knocking Naruto out before his inauguration as Hokage with Kurama developing a phobia of her from the near-death ordeal and giving Naruto Syngenesophobia. She visits Neji's grave with her mother during the epilogue. ^{[ch. 700]} During the events of Boruto, following the timeskip, Himawari is revealed to have become the Jinchuruiki of the assumed dead Kurama when he tricked Naruto into sacrificing him to assume Baryon Mode in their fight against Isshiki. Himawari reveals her Jinchuriki status while fighting Jura, who sensed Kurama within her.

In the Japanese version, Himawari is voiced by Yūki Kuwahara in The Last: Naruto the Movie and Saori Hayami in Boruto: Naruto the Movie. In the English version, Himawari is voiced by Stephanie Sheh in The Last: Naruto the Movie and Melissa Fahn in Boruto: Naruto the Movie

=== Kagura Karatachi ===
Kagura Karatachi (枸橘かぐら, Karatachi Kagura) is the grandson of the Fourth Mizukage Yagura Karatachi. Kagura was killed by the revenge-seeking Funamushi of the Funato Clan. Kagura is voiced by Keisuke Kōmoto in Japanese and Bryce Papenbrook in the English dub.

== Other characters ==
=== Sunagakure ===
==== Chiyo ====
Chiyo (チヨ) was an elder advisor to Sunagakure introduced at the start of Part II, initially mistrustful of other ninja villages because of the Second and Third Great Ninja Wars. During those wars, she played a role in formal treaties while strengthening Sunagakure's military might with her knowledge of poisons despite her efforts being nullified by Tsunade's antidotes. As a skilled puppeteer, Chiyo takes Sasori in after his parents died at the hands of Sakumo Hatake, the father of Kakashi. She teaches him everything she knows before he left the Sand village. When Gaara is captured by the Akatsuki, Chiyo joins Team Kakashi to rescue the Kazekage. Confronting Sasori, Chiyo is able to kill her grandson after Sasori purposefully does not avoid an attack. Despite their efforts, Gaara dies before they can rescue him.^{[ch. 275, 278]} Touched by the genuine bond formed between the Sand and the Leaf, Chiyo gives up her life to revive Gaara, hoping that the relationship of peace might be continued.^{[ch. 280]} However, by the Fourth Great Ninja War, Chiyo is brought back by Kabuto's Reanimation Jutsu to fight against the combined Ninja army. She is eventually put back to rest after Itachi cancels the technique. The character is voiced by Ikuko Tani in the Japanese anime, and by Barbara Goodson in the English dub.

=== Kumogakure ===
==== Darui ====
Darui (ダルイ) is a Kumogakure ninja who serves as one of the bodyguards for the Fourth Raikage during the Kage Summit. In contrast to his master, he is easygoing and tends to apologize, which the Raikage chastises him for. He is taught by the Third Raikage on the arts of black lightning, shaping it in the form of black panther, and also possesses the Storm Style kekkei genkai, a mixture of lightning and water elements that forms flowing lightning. During the Fourth Ninja War, Darui leads the First Division specializing in mid-range battles. Sometime between the war's end and the series epilogue, he becomes the Fifth Raikage (五代目雷影, Godaime Raikage). During Boruto: Naruto Next Generations, Darui goes to the Leaf Village to oversee the Chunnin Exams. He is voiced by Ryota Takeuchi in the Japanese anime and Catero Colbert in the English dub, though Ogie Banks replaces the latter for the Ultimate Ninja Storm series of video games.

==== A (Third Raikage) ====
A (あ, Ē) is the Third Raikage (三代目雷影, Sandaime Raikage). He is known as the greatest Raikage who dueled Eight-Tails and faced an army by himself. One time during the Third Great Ninja War, he and his team was surrounded by an army of 10,000 shinobi. To allow his comrades to escape, he decided to hold off the entire enemy forces for three full days to let his team escape. He soon died after exhausting all of his chakra. Years later, during the Fourth Great Ninja War, he was reanimated by Kabuto Yakushi alongside other prominent Kages like Rasa, the Fourth Kazekage, Mu, the Second Tsuchikage, and Gengetsu Hōzuki, the Second Mizukage. The Four Kages eventually had a skirmish with an Allied Shinobi Force division led by Gaara. A was defeated by Naruto Uzumaki specifically and was sealed away. He is voiced by Naoki Tamanoi in Japanese, and in English by Beau Billingslea in his initial appearance, before he was replaced by Neil Kaplan from episode 282 to 301, where Billingslea reprises his role as A once again. In the English dub of Naruto Shippuden: Ultimate Ninja Storm 3, he is instead voiced by Fred Tatasciore.

==== Karui ====
Karui (カルイ) is one of Killer Bee's subordinates, a part of Team Samui. She is greatly worried by her teacher's disappearance following his fight with Taka and visits Konohagakure with her team in order to find him. A passionate and bold young woman, she quickly becomes involved in an altercation with Team Kakashi, blaming them for befriending and defending Sasuke Uchiha. She even proceeds to brutally punch Naruto in the face repeatedly after he allows her to do so as compensation for not giving up information on Sasuke. Karui is assigned as part of the Second Division during the Fourth Ninja War. Sometime after the war ends, she moves to Konohagakure and marries Choji Akimichi, giving birth to their daughter Chocho, who is an academy student in the series epilogue.^{[ch. 700]} Karui is voiced by Yuka Komatsu in the Japanese anime. In the English dub, Danielle Nicolet voices the character in Naruto and Sascha Alexander in Boruto: Naruto Next Generations.

=== Kirigakure ===
==== Mei Terumi ====
Mei Terumi (照美 メイ, Terumī Mei) is the Fifth Mizukage (五代目水影, Godaime Mizukage) of the Kirigakure. She possesses two kekkei genkai: the Lava Style, a combination of fire and earth elements that allows her to spit lava, and Vapor Style, which mixes fire and water to create corrosive mist. She is apparently relatively new to the position and does not remember the previous leadership, which conducted witch hunts against kekkei genkai users like her, fondly. During the Kage Summit, Mei acts rather dodgy when asked about rumors that the Akatsuki formed in her village, and when she finds out Danzo is capable of mind control she suspects him of using it on the previous Mizukage. She manages to nearly kill Sasuke during the meeting and initially helps guard the daimyō of the Shinobi Countries during the preparation for the Fourth Ninja War. During the war, Mei fights the revived Madara Uchiha with the other Kages, though despite their impressive teamwork, they still end up losing to Madara's might. Years after the war comes to an end and during some point at the epilogue, Mei passes down her title to her former bodyguard Chōjūrō. Despite being a beautiful woman in her thirties, she is never married, and the status of being one pains her. She is voiced by Yurika Hino in the Japanese anime, and by Mary Elizabeth McGlynn in the English adaptation.

==== Chojuro ====
Chojuro (長十郎, Chōjūrō) is one of Mei Terumi's bodyguards, with the other being Ao. He is one of the Seven Swordsmen of the Mist, carrying the sword Hiramekarei (ヒラメカレイ), but after Zabuza Momochi and Kisame Hoshigaki are killed, he becomes the only real one left of the Swordsmen; in addition, he is the only one affiliated with the village at the beginning of the series. Chojuro frequently annoys Ao because he stutters and seems to lack self-confidence. After accompanying the Mizukage to the Kage Summit, he helps her guard the daimyō of the Shinobi Countries, and is able to gain enough self-confidence to help Naruto defeat Black Zetsu. He later becomes the Sixth Mizukage (六代目水影, Rokudaime Mizukage) sometime after the war. In the Japanese anime, he is voiced by Kouki Miyata, while Brian Beacock provides his voice in the English adaptation.

==== Ao ====
Ao (青) is one of Mei Terumi's bodyguards. He is a middle-aged ninja who wears an eyepatch on his right eye, a Byakugan he acquired from a main house Hyuga, and is often critical of Chōjūrō's indecisiveness due to his upbringing during Hidden Mist Village's "Blood Mist" days. When Mifune suggests Danzo Shimura to lead the inter-village effort against the Akatsuki, Ao reveals his Byakugan to confirm that Danzo's eye and arm belonged to Shisui Uchiha, whom he fought and aware of the Uchiha's ability to covertly manipulate others. Ao then goes after Danzo's group when they flee during Taka's attack, only to saved by Mei and Chōjūrō when he fell into a trap that Danzo's men set up in an attempt to retrieve his Byakugan. Ao serves in the Allied Shinobi Forces as captain of the Sensor Division stationed in the Shinobi Alliance Headquarters in Kumogakure, barely surviving the Ten Tails' Tailed Beast Bomb when it obliterated their base. Later revealed to have survived in Boruto: Naruto Next Generations, his body has been augmented with Shinobi-Ware prosthetics that include a Type-3 Shinobi Gauntlet replacing his left forearm. Ao had become a sleeper agent for the Kara. He engaged Team Konohamaru and Katasuke, using one of the latter's inventions to kill Mugino. A revenge-driven Boruto manages to outwit and overpower Ao, sparing the man's life, and making him return to the Shinobi side. Ao ends up sacrificing himself to save Boruto from being crushed by Kashin Koji's Boiler Toad. He is voiced by Tadahisa Saizen in the Japanese anime, while Steven Blum voices him in the English adaptation.

==== Gengetsu Hozuki ====
Gengetsu Hozuki (鬼灯 幻月, Hōzuki Gengetsu) was the Second Mizukage (二代目水影, Nidaime Mizukage) of Kirigakure. A very tall mustached man with large poofy hair, curious way of dressing and with no eyebrows, he was laid back and very charismatic leader concerned with the welfare of his village.^{[ch. 546]} He loathed the Second Tsuchikage and their final confrontation with each other resulted in their mutual deaths.^{[ch. 525]} Gengetsu is brought back to life by Kabuto's resurrection technique alongside other prominent Kages like Rasa, the Fourth Kazekage, Mu, the Second Tsuchikage, and A, the Third Raikage to face the Shinobi Alliance in the Fourth Ninja War. The Four Kages eventually had a skirmish with the Allied Forces and was defeated. Like other members of the Hozuki clan, he mastered hydrification technique, which manifests itself as an oily, water like substance.^{[ch. 548]} He is voiced by Hideyuki Umezu in the Japanese anime, while Jamieson Price voices him in the English adaptation.

==== Yagura Karatachi ====
Yagura Karatachi was the Fourth Mizukage of Kirigakure or the Village Hidden in the Mist. He was a short and pink-eyed character who was the Jinchuriki of the Three-Tails Isobu. A while after becoming a Jinchuriki, Yagura was confronted by Obito Uchiha, Pain (Nagato Uzumaki), and Konan, and Obito placed Yagura under a powerful genjutsu, essentially enslaving Yagura as his will was basically being overwritten by Obito. Due to Yagura being enslaved and manipulated, he forced his village to enter the Bloody Mist era where students are forced to fight each other to the death to be able to graduate if they survive. After years of secretly being controlled by Obito, Ao finally discovered the genjutsu manipulating Yagura after he used his Byakugan. Ao eventually dispelled the genjutsu but Yagura died shortly after, subsequently killing the Three-Tails as well. During the Fourth Great Ninja War, Kabuto Yakushi reanimated Yagura Karatachi. A while later, Kabuto was forced by reanimated Itachi Uchiha to cease his Reanimation jutsu. Subsequently, Yagura was released from the Reanimation jutsu. Yagura was voiced by Miyu Irino in Japanese and Johnny Yong Bosch along with Nicolas Roye in English.

=== Iwagakure ===
==== Onoki ====
Onoki (オオノキ, Ōnoki) was the Third Tsuchikage (三代目土影, Sandaime Tsuchikage) of the Iwagakure, the grandson of the First Tsuchikage Ishikawa, and a protege of his predecessor Mu with longest reign as Kage that allowed him to personally meet many figures long dead in the present, including Madara Uchiha.^{[ch. 469]} He possesses the Particle Style, a kekkei tota that combines Fire, Earth, and Wind elements to create three-dimensional shapes capable of disintegrating anything it touches, as well as the ability to alter gravity, enabling him flight. He is very proud, despite his frailty,^{[ch. 454]} and shows little respect to those much younger than him. During the Kage Summit, he admitted to have frequently hired Akatsuki members.^{[ch. 458]}^{[ch. 459]} While Onoki justify hiring the Akatsuki as necessary in protecting his village during its demilitarization, both it and his advanced age kept him from being named leader of the Shinobi Alliance though Sasuke's intrusion and Gaara's conduct cause Onoki to regain some of more noble traits from his youth. Later, he goes out to find Kabuto and prevent him from finding Killer Bee and Naruto and succeeds in protecting them, although Kabuto does successfully capture Yamato, Naruto's bodyguard. Throughout the war, Onoki's techniques proved instrumental in keeping Alliance members alive and he becomes the de facto leader in the assault against the real Madara Uchiha. Years later, Onoki retires due to his failing health and passes down his title to his granddaughter, Kurotsuchi. In the Boruto series, following an attack on his village by a rogue ninja a decade after the Fourth Great Ninja War that took the life of his grandson Kozuchi, Onoki began to develop the Akuta as a defense force to keep people safe and unharmed. He continued perfecting the process after receiving a White Zetsu's remains, improving on the Akuta while creating Fabrications like his partial clone son Kū as he orchestrated Mitsuki's abduction to refine the process. But upon seeing the extent the Fabrications would go to see his ideals realized, Onoki helps Boruto stop the artificial humans at the cost of his life. Onoki is voiced by Tomomichi Nishimura in the Japanese anime and Steven Blum in the English adaptation.

==== Kurotsuchi ====
Kurotsuchi (黒ツチ) is Onoki's granddaughter and his bodyguard during the Kage Summit. She is a kunoichi who favors her village's best interests greatly, even once advising Onoki to kill Naruto and Killer Bee so as to avoid seeing them fall to the Akatsuki. She was also an acquaintance of Deidara before his defection to the Akatsuki. Kurotsuchi participates in the Fourth Ninja War, serving in the Second Division under her father, Kitsuchi. She survives the war and becomes the Fourth Tsuchikage (四代目土影, Yondaime Tsuchikage) by the series epilogue, replacing her ailing grandfather. She is voiced by Hana Takeda in the Japanese anime and Laura Bailey in the English adaptation and is also voiced by Cherami Leigh in Boruto: Naruto Next Generations.

==== Akatsuchi ====
Akatsuchi (赤ツチ) is one of Onoki's bodyguards accompanying him for the Kage Summit. He is a portly and jovial man who is nevertheless loyal and dedicated to his master. Despite his big size, he moves fast and excels in Earth Style, using it to form golems. Like Kurotsuchi, he was a friend of Deidara before his defection to the Akatsuki. Akatsuchi participates in and survives the Fourth Ninja War, continuing to serve as the Tsuchikage's personal bodyguard well over into Kurotsuchi's reign. He is voiced by Kenta Miyake in Japanese and by Kyle Hebert in English.

==== Mu ====
Mu (無, Mū) was the Second Tsuchikage (二代目土影, Nidaime Tsuchikage) of Iwagakure. While he was voiced by Osamu Mukai in the Japanese anime, he had multiple English voice actors: J.B. Blanc in most appearances, Jonathan Fahn in Naruto Shippuden episode 340, and by Wally Wingert in Naruto Shippuden: Ultimate Ninja Storm 3

=== Tailed Beasts ===
==== Kurama (Nine-Tails) ====
Kurama (九喇嘛), often called the Nine-Tails (九尾の妖狐, Kyūbi no Yōko; lit. Nine-Tailed Fox), is the most powerful of the Tailed Beasts. Used by Madara in his attempt to wipe out Konohagakure at the time of its foundation, Kurama is defeated and sealed within Hashirama's wife and then transferred to Kushina Uzumaki two generations later. Through Obito's scheme, Kurama is released and attacks Konohagakure before being stopped by the Fourth Hokage Minato Namikaze, who seals the fox's Yin half within himself. Following this, Minato and Kushina sacrifice themselves to seal the weakened Yang-Kurama within their son, Naruto Uzumaki, twelve years before the series' start.^{[ch. 1]}^{[ch. 500]} Throughout the series, Naruto tries to harness Yang-Kurama's immense chakra to perform several jutsu that would normally be impossible for a shinobi of his age.^{[ch. 95]} But Naruto soon learns that relying too much on Yang-Kurama's power would allow Yang-Kurama to impose its will over its host to the point of breaking the seal. Naruto eventually takes control of Yang-Kurama's chakra with help from an imprint of Kushina.^{[ch. 499]}

During Naruto's fight against Obito, seeing its host's resolve to save the other Tailed Beasts, Yang-Kurama befriends Naruto by allowing him to achieve Tailed Beast Mode.^{[ch. 571]} Eventually, as Yang-Kurama is extracted from Naruto, the Tailed Beast tells Gaara how to save Naruto's life by transferring Yin-Kurama from Minato into Naruto. Yang-Kurama is later returned to its Jinchuriki's body and becomes whole again as it reunites with its Yin counterpart to regains their original size and powers. During the events of Boruto series, Kurama convinces Naruto to use Baryon Mode as final resort in the fight against Isshiki, which results in Kurama ceasing to exist with Naruto rendered a normal human. But due to his nature as a Tailed Beast, Kurama eventually reconstitutes within the body of Himawari Uzumaki as she becomes his new Jinchuriki.

Kishimoto was mainly inspired to create Kurama based on the character with the same name from the manga series YuYu Hakusho. The inclusion of the fox spirit was also inspired by Godzilla.

In the Japanese anime, Kurama's voice actor is Tesshō Genda, and in the English adaptation, he is voiced by Paul St. Peter.

==== Gyūki (Eight-Tails) ====
Gyūki (牛鬼), is known as the Eight-Tails (八尾, Hachibi) of the Tailed Beasts. It was most recently sealed inside Killer Bee of Kumogakure. Gyūki is an octopus with an ox-like head. It is likely based on the yōkai Ushi-oni.

In the Japanese anime, Gyūki's voice actor is Masaki Aizawa, and in the English adaptation, it is voiced by Matthew Mercer.

==== Chōmei (Seven-Tails) ====
Chōmei (重明), is known as the Seven-Tails (七尾, Nanabi, Shichibi) of the Tailed Beasts. Prior to the Akatsuki's hunt of the Tailed Beasts, it was sealed inside Fū of Takigakure. Chōmei is a Japanese rhinoceros beetle.

In the Japanese anime, Chōmei's voice actor is Kenichi Suzumura, and in the English adaptation, it is voiced by Steven Blum.

==== Saiken (Six-Tails) ====
Saiken (犀犬), is known as the Six-Tails (六尾, Rokubi) of the Tailed Beasts. The beast was sealed inside Utakata of Kirigakure. Utakata was later nabbed by the Akatsuki, specifically Pain. Saiken is a slug.

In the Japanese anime, Saiken's voice actor is Miyu Irino, and in the English adaptation, it is voiced by Todd Haberkorn.

==== Kokuō (Five-Tails) ====
Kokuō (穆王), is known as the Five-Tails (五尾, Gobi) of the Tailed Beasts. Prior to the Akatsuki's hunt of the Tailed Beasts, it was sealed inside Han of Iwagakure. Kokuō is a horse-dolphin.

In the Japanese anime, Kokuō's voice actor is Mie Sonozaki, and in the English adaptation, it is voiced by Mary Elizabeth McGlynn.

==== Son Gokū (Four-Tails) ====
Seiten Taisei Son Gokū (斉天大聖孫悟空), is known as the Four-Tails (四尾, Yonbi) of the Tailed Beasts. Prior to the Akatsuki's hunt of the Tailed Beasts, he was sealed inside Rōshi of Iwagakure. Son Gokū is a gorilla-monkey, likely based on Sun Wukong.

In the Japanese anime, Son Gokū's voice actor is Hiroki Yasumoto, and in the English adaptation, he is voiced by John Eric Bentley.

==== Isobu (Three-Tails) ====
Isobu (磯撫), is known as the Three-Tails (三尾, Sanbi) of the Tailed Beasts. The beast was once forcefully sealed by Hidden Mist ninjas into Rin Nohara. Kakashi Hatake accidentally killed Rin, killing Isobu in the process, when she purposefully jumped in front of Kakashi's chidori when he tried to attack the Hidden Mist ninjas. The beast was eventually reincarnated and soon sealed inside Yagura Karatachi of Kirigakure before Yagura died, resulting in the death of Isobu again. After Isobu was eventually and naturally reincarnated in a lake, Hidden Leaf ninjas, Orochimaru's henchmen, and the Akatsuki, specifially Obito and Deidara, tried to nab and seal the beast. However, the Akatsuki emerged victorious, managing to nab the beast. Isobu is a turtle, likely based on the yōkai: the Isonade.

In the Japanese anime, Isobu's voice actor is Shigenori Sōya, and in the English adaptation, it is voiced by Chris Edgerly.

==== Matatabi (Two-Tails) ====
Matatabi (又旅), is known as the Two-Tails (ニ尾, Nibi) of the Tailed Beasts. It was sealed inside Yugito Nii of Kumogakure, before she was nabbed by Hidan and Kakuzu, both of which were Akatsuki members. Matatabi is a tiger-like cat, likely based on the yōkai: the Nekomata and/or the Bakeneko.

In the Japanese anime, Matatabi's voice actor is Ryōko Shiraishi, and in the English adaptation, it is voiced by Cristina Vee.

==== Shukaku (One-Tail) ====
Shukaku (守鶴), is known as the One-Tails (一尾, Ichibi) of the Tailed Beasts. It was sealed inside Gaara of Sunagakure, before Deidara and Sasori, both Ataksuki members, nabbed Gaara and sealed the beast in a vessel. Shukaku is a tanuki, likely based on the yōkai: the Bake-danuki.

In the Japanese anime, Shukaku's voice actor is Hiroshi Iwasaki, and in the English adaptation, he is voiced by Kirk Thornton.

=== Taka ===
Taka (鷹), originally named Hebi (蛇), is a group of shinobi formed by Sasuke originally to locate and kill Itachi Uchiha, but later allied with the Akatsuki to destroy Konohagakure. ^{[ch. 352]} Each of them were forcibly taken in by Orochimaru and forced to serve under him as Otogakure shinobi along with Sasuke, ultimately seeking redemption by allying with Sasuke. The group gets split up after their attempt at terrorizing the Five Kage Summit, but they later reunite as part of the Allied Shinobi Forces. Following the war, they went back to Otogakure along with Orochimaru.

==== Suigetsu Hozuki ====
Suigetsu Hozuki (鬼灯水月, Hōzuki Suigetsu) is the first member to join. Originally from Kirigakure, his goal is to claim all of the swords wielded by the Seven Swordsmen of the Mist, and from there reform the organization in memory of his late brother Mangetsu, who was a member himself.^{[ch. 523]} Although his dream was initially cut short by Orochimaru, after Sasuke freed him he managed to claim Zabuza's sword, but lost it while battling the Kage. Suigetsu tends to have a sadistic personality, constantly fascinating about cutting things and consequently getting on Karin's nerves, yet sees himself as normal in comparison to most other people. His clan has the ability to turn any part of their body into water, but must stay hydrated to do so.^{[ch. 347]} Suigetsu is voiced by Takashi Kondo in Japanese and by Grant George in the English dub except in Rock Lee and His Ninja Pals, where he is voiced by Todd Haberkorn.

==== Karin ====
Karin (香燐) is the second member of Taka and a member of the Uzumaki Clan that Naruto, Kushina, Nagato and Mito belong to. She was originally from Kusagakure and later another unnamed village, but after the latter was destroyed, she was taken in by Orochimaru, eventually becoming a loyal servant to him. After briefly encountering Sasuke during the Chunin Exams, she became addicted to him and decided to join Taka to be at his side.^{[ch. 482]} Karin was critically wounded by Sasuke during his battle against Danzo, and after he left her behind, Karin was arrested by Kakashi, in turn meeting Naruto for the first time^{[ch. 486]}. She later met up with Sasuke to confront him, but instead immediately forgave him. Sometime after, she moved on from Sasuke due to wanting him to be happy and helped deliver Sasuke and Sakura's daughter, Sarada. Karin is a Sensor Type, able to sense others' chakra and feel a person's aura that way, such as seeing Naruto's chakra as "bright and warm". She can also heal people if they bite her, which causes them to absorb chakra, leaving permanent marks all over her body, but due to the risks involved, she can only use it once per day. In Japanese, Karin is voiced by Kanako Tōjō up until Episode 485, when Toa Yukinari takes over. In English, she is voiced by Ali Hillis except in Rock Lee and His Ninja Pals, where she is voiced by Michelle Ruff.

==== Jugo ====
Jugo (重吾, Jūgo) is the third member of Taka. His clan has the ability to use senjutsu, but due to the severe amount of natural energy they absorb they are prone to fits of extreme violence, with additional side effects being that they can revert to a childlike form if they use it the wrong way. Because of this, in childhood, Jugo was an outcast, eventually finding solace in Kimimaro whom he saw as an older sibling.^{[ch. 414]} After meeting Sasuke, he tried to refuse being part of Taka and used his abilities, but Sasuke managed to calm him down. As Kimimaro was the only other person who could do this, Jugo decided to follow Sasuke in the belief that he was Kimimaro's reincarnation.^{[ch. 414]} Jugo is voiced by Shuhei Sakaguchi in Japanese and by Travis Willingham in the English dub except in Rock Lee and His Ninja Pals, where he is voiced by Patrick Seitz and is also voiced by Kyle Hebert in Boruto: Naruto Next Generations.

=== Rin Nohara ===
Rin Nohara (のはら リン, Nohara Rin) is a female member of Team Minato and the teammate of Kakashi Hatake and Obito Uchiha, appearing only in person during the Kakashi Gaiden act.^{[ch. 239]} She acts as a medical ninja and had a crush on Kakashi, though she is unaware that she herself has the affection of Obito. When Team Minato is sent to sabotage Kannabi Bridge during the Third Great Ninja War, she was kidnapped by the Iwagakure ninja before the resulting rescue mission ends with Obito's apparent death.^{[ch. 241, 243]} Sometime afterward, she is captured by the Kirigakure ninja and made into Isobu's Jinchuriki as part of a Trojan horse scheme to destroy Konoha. Rin realized the scheme while being rescued and jumped in the way of Kakashi's Lightning Blade to save the village at the cost of her life, which is later revealed to have been orchestrated by Madara to break Obito's spirit.^{[ch. 604, 630]} Obito later learns upon his death that Rin's spirit has always been waiting for him, and later guides him to the other side after he metaphysically helps Kakashi one last time in his team's battle against Kaguya. In the Japanese anime, Rin's voice actress is Haruhi Nanao, and her English voice actress is Stephanie Sheh.

=== Kushina Uzumaki ===
Kushina Uzumaki (うずまき クシナ, Uzumaki Kushina) is the mother of Naruto Uzumaki and the wife of the Fourth Hokage Minato Namikaze.^{[ch. 382]} She is a host of Kurama, immediately preceding Naruto.^{[ch. 499]} While Naruto shares his colouring with his father, Minato, he inherits his facial appearance and most of his personality from Kushina, who is brash, temperamental, likes ramen, and even has the "Believe it!" (だってばね, dattebane) verbal tic, which both her son and grandson inherit. Being a member of the Uzumaki Clan, Kushina possesses a special chakra that was distinguished even among her peers, causing her to be sent from her homeland to Konohagakure to be the host of Kurama, replacing Mito Uzumaki.^{[ch. 500]} In Konohagakure, Kushina met with Minato who became Kushina's love after he saved her from a kidnapper, leading to their marriage.^{[ch. 498]} During her pregnancy, she had to be sent to a secretive place during labor to prevent Kurama's seal being broken.^{[ch. 500]} However, the place was subdued by Obito Uchiha, and he released Kurama who ran rampant on Konoha.^{[ch. 501]} She and Minato both sacrifice their lives to seal Kurama to Naruto after the tailed beast is weakened from losing his yin-chakra, while also placing some of their chakra to their son as a fail-safe if he would break the seal.^{[ch. 503]} In Part II, Kushina's chakra appears during Naruto's subconscious battle with Kurama, helping her son to seal the fox and to tell him the truth behind Kurama's attack sixteen years ago.^{[ch. 497]} Before disappearing, she thanks Naruto for forgiving her about the whole ordeal of the sealing of Kurama.^{[ch. 504]} In the Japanese anime, Kushina is voiced by Emi Shinohara. She was voiced by Cindy Robinson in the English version before Laura Bailey took over the role since episode 246 and onwards.

== Reception ==
The characters of Naruto have received both praise and criticism from publications dedicated to anime, manga, and other media. Active Anime lauded the characters for not being "simple cardboard cut-out characters" due to their "fleshed out personalities" and "underlying dramatic motivations", and praised the "deeply moving emotional trials" they undergo over the course of the series. Adam Cook of Anime Boredom agreed with this assessment, extolling the characters as "well rounded" and "imaginative", and celebrated how the characters allowed the series to successfully incorporate comedy, action, and drama together in a believable manner. A review from Derrick Tucker, also of THEM Anime Reviews offered a positive view, commenting that Naruto Uzumaki combined the finer values of his shōnen predecessors, but lamented how the characters' personalities tended to fall between Naruto's "charisma and coolness" and Sasuke's "blandness", making it difficult to think about the characters on "any deep or meaningful level". Justin Rich of the entertainment website Mania asserted that the series lacked the "tremendous depth in it's [sic] characters" or "the most flushed [sic] out backgrounds" seen in other shōnen series, and believed the primary strength of the series was the fighting.

The visual appearances of the characters in the anime and manga have also received notice from reviewers. Carl Kimlinger of Anime News Network praised the characters' "distinctive clothing, hair, faces and personalities" that made them easily identifiable, as well as Kishimoto's "clear eye for geography, movement and the human form" and "impeccable visual timing". Tucker, on the other hand, described Kishimoto as "an average artist at best" and derided the poor transition of his artistic style into animation. Despite this, he admitted that when the animators were at their best, they produced "artistic renderings that leave little to be desired on the part of fans of the manga", but ultimately concluded the animation was "a mixed bag".
