= Maile Flanagan =

American actress

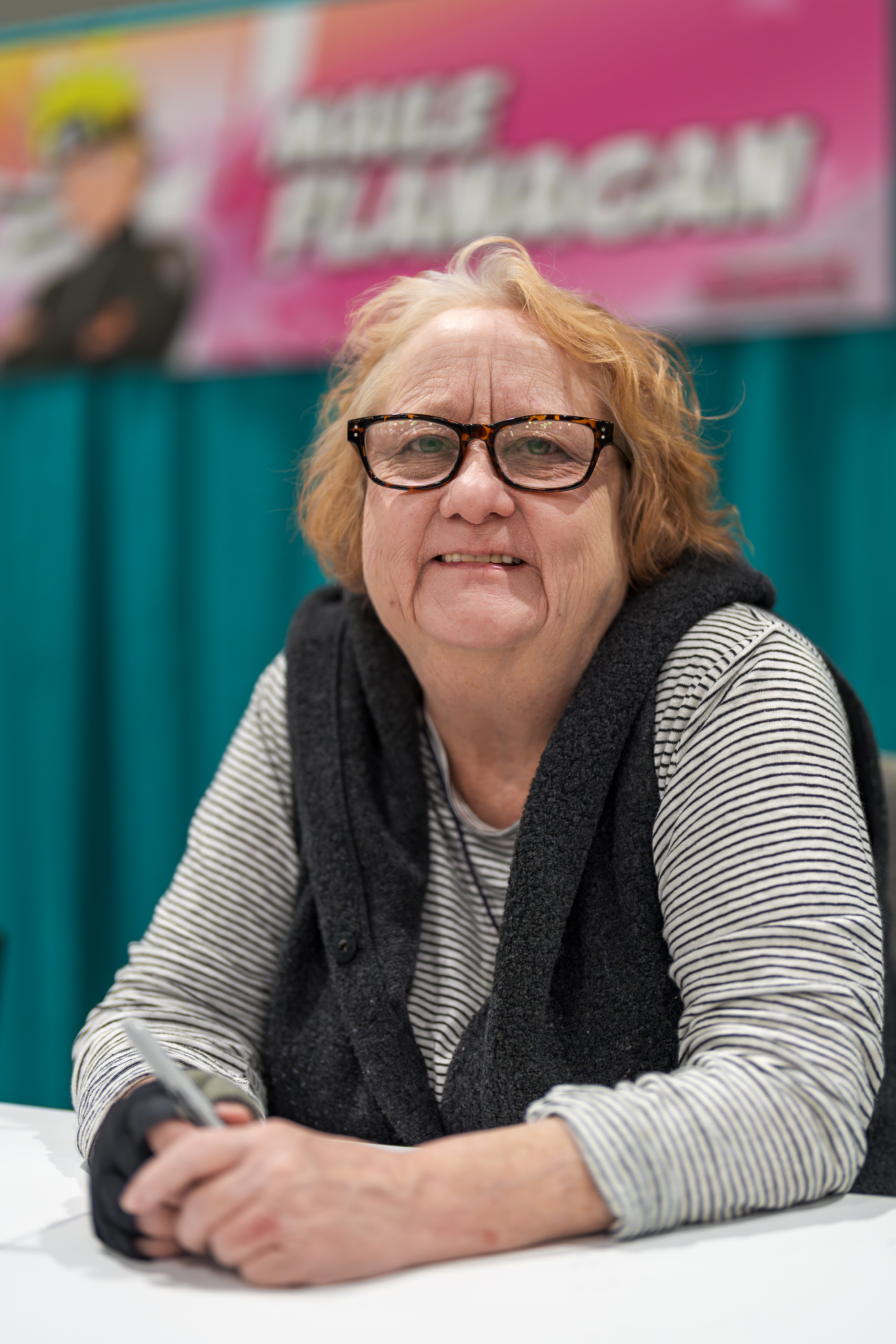
- Flanagan at Animate! Raleigh in 2026
- Born: Honolulu, Hawaii, U.S.
- Education: Boston College (BA)
- Occupations: Actress; comedian
- Years active: 1998–present
- Spouse: Lesa Hammett (m. 2008)

Maile Flanagan (/ˈmaɪli/) is an American actress and comedian. She is best known as the voice of Naruto Uzumaki in the English dub of the Naruto franchise. Other prominent roles include voicing Piggley Winks in Jakers! The Adventures of Piggley Winks (for which she received two nominations for the Daytime Emmy Award for Outstanding Performer in an Animated Program and won once), and portraying Principal Terry Perry in Lab Rats.

Flanagan's live-action film work include appearances in Phone Booth (2002), The Number 23 (2007), Evan Almighty (2007), 500 Days of Summer (2009) and Transformers: Dark of the Moon (2011). She has also made guest appearances in several television series such as ER, Shameless, Bad Teacher, The Office and Grey's Anatomy. She appeared on the ABC sitcom Not Dead Yet in a recurring capacity. As of 2023, she is the voice of Matthew "Matt" Hornsby on the Adult Swim animated sitcom Royal Crackers.

Flanagan has numerous theater credits including working with writer/director Justin Tanner in his plays Oklahomo!, Wife Swappers, Pot Mom, and Zombie Attack!

== Early life ==
Flanagan was born in Honolulu, Hawaii. Her father worked in an intelligence position for the U.S. military. In 1969, her family was stationed in Bangkok, Thailand and when she was ten, they moved to Germany.

She graduated from Munich America High School (MAHS), a Department of Defense (DOD) school, in 1983. In 1987, Flanagan graduated from Boston College with a degree in political science, concentrated in history and mathematics.

== Career ==
After a brief stint in Washington, D.C., Flanagan moved to Minneapolis and worked in theater roles and did stand-up comedy. She was in the comedy troupe Every Mother's Nightmare with Wayne Wilderson, Tom McCarthy and Nancy Walls. In 1996, she moved to Los Angeles with the stage production of The Bad Seed, which won an LA Weekly Theater Award for Best Comedy Ensemble.

Flanagan's first major voice role in animation was Piggley Winks in Jakers! The Adventures of Piggley Winks, for which she was nominated for an Annie Award in 2005. She was then cast as the title character, Naruto Uzumaki, in the English dub of Naruto, and has consistently voiced the kid, teen and adult incarnations of Naruto in all of its properties including numerous spin-offs and video game adaptations. She also earned an Emmy Award for Outstanding Performer in an Animated Program for her performance in Jakers! The Adventures of Piggley Winks in 2006.

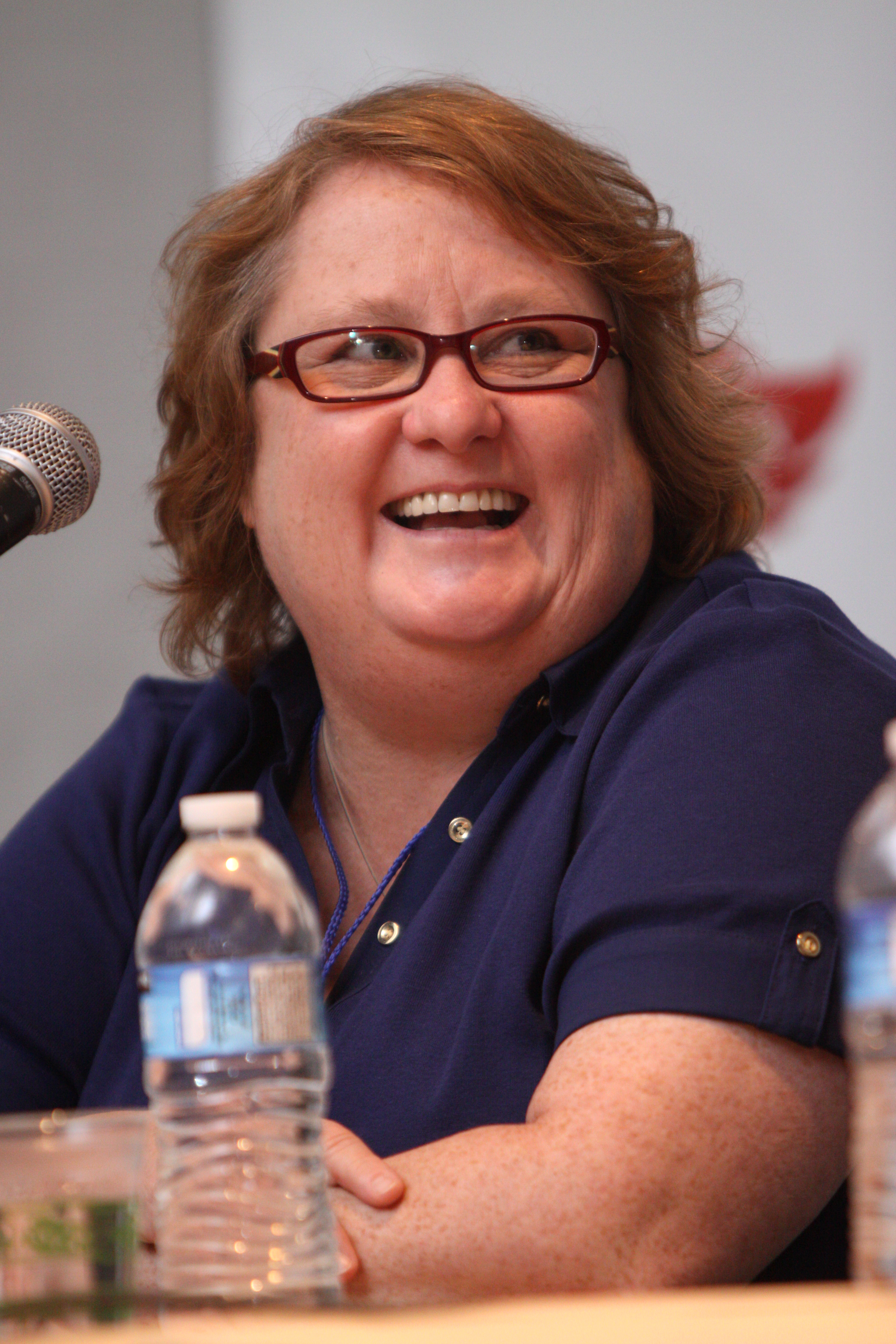
Flanagan at the 2012 Phoenix Comic-Con

In 2009, Flanagan provided the voice of Mother Aardvark in the third installment of Ice Age film series. Also in 2009, she appeared in Marc Webb's romantic comedy drama 500 Days of Summer and Justin Tanner's play Voice Lessons. The following year, she lent her voice to Orangu-Tammy in the animated film Kung-Fu Magoo.

From 2012, Flanagan starred as Terry Perry, principal of the Mission Creek High School in the Disney XD live-action comedy series Lab Rats; she was in the show for four seasons until it ended in 2016. She reprised the role again in the 2016 spinoff of the series called Lab Rats: Elite Force. She also had a recurring role as Connie in the third and fourth season of the Showtime comedy-drama TV series Shameless (2013–14).

In February 2023, Flanagan appeared as Tina in the ABC sitcom Not Dead Yet, based on Alexandra Potter's 2020 novel Confessions of a Forty-Something F**k Up. She also provided the voice of Matt Hornsby in Royal Crackers, which ran on Adult Swim in April of that same year.

== Personal life ==
Flanagan is openly a lesbian. She married Lesa Hammett in 2008.

== Filmography ==
=== Live-action roles ===
==== Television ====
List of live-action acting performances on television and related media
Year	Title	Role	Notes	Source
1998	MADtv	Chaz Bono	Uncredited role; Episode #4.1	
2001	Gideon's Crossing	Nurse Daley	2 episodes: "The Crash" & "Freakshow"	
2001	Citizen Baines	Carmen	Episode: "The Whole Thump-Thump-Thump"	
2001	61*	Housewife	TV movie	
2005	Hot Properties	Woman	Episode: "Killer Bodies"	
2006	Lovespring International	Ruth Hardwood	Episode: "The Loser Club"	
2006	Desperate Housewives	Cashier	Episode: "Bang"	
2006	ER	Elaine Martinelli	Episode: "Tell Me No Secrets"	
2006	Big Day	Linda	Episode: "Boobzilla"	
2005–07	Grey's Anatomy	Lab Tech	4 Episodes	
2006–07	The Class	Penny	2 episodes: "The Class Gives Thanks" & "The Class Goes Back to the Hospital"	
2007	The Office	Phyllis' sister	Episode: "Phyllis' Wedding"	
2008	Reno 911!	Madam Carla	2 episodes: "Strong Sister" & "The Tanning Both Incident"	
2008	Rules of Engagement	Audrey's Co-worker	1 episode	
2009	iCarly	Security guard at Dingo Studios	Episode: “iTake on Dingo”	
2009	In the Motherhood	Linda	Episode: "In Sickness and in Health"	
2010	Svetlana	Client (Maile)	Episode: "Gumption"	
2011	Weeds	Lady in Sauna	Episode: "Bags"	
2012–16	Lab Rats	Terry Perry	Recurring role; 44 episodes	
2013	Last Man Standing	Dr. Kathy Pullman	Episode: "Attractive Architect"	
2013–14	Shameless	Connie	Recurring role; 6 episodes	
2014	Bad Teacher	Linda	2 episodes	
2015	Mike & Molly	Darlene	Episode: "Mudlick or Bust"	
2015	Modern Family	Immigration Officer	Episode: "Patriot Games"	
2016	Lab Rats: Elite Force	Terry Perry	Recurring role; 4 episodes	
2023-24	Not Dead Yet	Tina	Recurring role; 14 episodes	

==== Film ====
List of live-action acting performances in feature films
Year	Title	Role	Notes	Source
1998	Overnight Delivery	Gas jockey		
2002	Phone Booth	Lana		
2002	Now You Know	Shelly		
2003	The Station Agent	Pappy's Waitress		
2007	The Number 23	Charades friend		
2007	Evan Almighty	Mail Person		
2008	Yes Man	Janet, the Cake baker		
2008	500 Days of Summer	Co-worker Rhoda		
2011	Transformers: Dark of the Moon	Acuretta Worker		
2012	Wrong	Pharmacist		
2013	Teacher of the Year	Hannah Manning		

=== Voice roles ===
==== Television ====
List of voice performances in television
Year	Title	Role	Notes	Source
1998	Men in Black: The Series	Old crone / Bully	Episode: "The Jack O'Lantern Syndrome"	
1999	Oh Yeah! Cartoons	Boy	Episode: "Herb"	
2000	Jackie Chan Adventures	Maynard	Episode: "Bullies"	
2003	Astro Boy	Matthew	English dub	
2003–06	Jakers! The Adventures of Piggley Winks	Young Piggley Winks / Fergal O'Hopper	52 episodes	
2005–09	Naruto	Naruto Uzumaki	English dub	
2007–09	Back at the Barnyard	Macy the Lamb	3 episodes	
2009–19	Naruto: Shippuden	Naruto Uzumaki	English dub	
2010	Fish Hooks	Sunny	Episode "Happy Birthfish, Jocktopus"	
2015	Shimmer and Shine	Grunts	Episode "Underground Bound"	
2015–17	Pig Goat Banana Cricket	JR Barton	14 episodes	
2016	Bunsen Is a Beast	Mikey Munroe	Pilot	
2018-21	The Loud House	Byron	4 Episodes	
2018–23	Boruto: Naruto Next Generations	Naruto Uzumaki	English dub	
2020	Curious George	Bus Driver	Episode "George's Little Library"	
2022	Tiger & Bunny	Carlotta Lindell	English Dub	
2022	Bee and PuppyCat: Lazy in Space	TempBot	Episode: "Did You Remember"	
2023–24	Royal Crackers	Matt Hornsby	16 episodes	

==== Film ====
List of voice acting performances in animated film
Year	Title	Role	Notes
2002	Tom and Jerry: The Magic Ring	Boy	
2009	Ice Age: Dawn of the Dinosaurs	Aardvark Mom	
2010	Kung-Fu Magoo	Orangu-Tammy	
2011	Rango	Lucky	
2014	Ava & Lala	Lala	
2018	Last Prince of Atlantis	Sea Turtle	

=== Video games ===
List of voice performances in video games
Year	Title	Role	Notes	Source
2006	Naruto: Clash of Ninja	Naruto Uzumaki	English dub	
2006	Naruto: Ninja Council	Naruto Uzumaki	English dub	
2006	Naruto: Clash of Ninja 2	Naruto Uzumaki	English dub	
2006	Naruto: Ultimate Ninja	Naruto Uzumaki	English dub	
2007	Naruto: Ultimate Ninja 2	Naruto Uzumaki	English dub	
2007	Naruto: Ultimate Ninja Heroes	Naruto Uzumaki	English dub	
2007	Naruto: Rise of a Ninja	Naruto Uzumaki	English dub	
2007	Naruto: Clash of Ninja Revolution	Naruto Uzumaki	English dub	
2008	Naruto: Ultimate Ninja Heroes 2: The Phantom Fortress	Naruto Uzumaki	English dub	
2008	Naruto: Ultimate Ninja 3	Naruto Uzumaki	English dub	
2008	Naruto: Ultimate Ninja Storm	Naruto Uzumaki	English dub	
2008	Naruto: The Broken Bond	Naruto Uzumaki	English dub	
2008	Naruto: Clash of Ninja Revolution 2	Naruto Uzumaki	English dub	
2009	Naruto Shippuden: Ultimate Ninja 4	Naruto Uzumaki	English dub	
2009	Naruto Shippuden: Clash of Ninja Revolution 3	Naruto Uzumaki	English dub	
2009	Naruto Shippuden: Legends: Akatsuki Rising	Naruto Uzumaki	English dub	
2010	Final Fantasy XIII	Cocoon Inhabitants	English dub	
2010	Naruto Shippuden: Ultimate Ninja Heroes 3	Naruto Uzumaki	English dub	
2010	Naruto Shippuden: Ultimate Ninja Storm 2	Naruto Uzumaki	English dub	
2010	Valkyria Chronicles II	Alexis Hilden	English dub	
2011	Naruto Shippuden: Ultimate Ninja Impact	Naruto Uzumaki	English dub	
2012	Naruto Shippuden: Ultimate Ninja Storm Generations	Naruto Uzumaki	English dub	
2012	Final Fantasy XIII-2	Rhett	English dub	
2013	Naruto Shippuden: Ultimate Ninja Storm 3	Naruto Uzumaki	English dub, with Full Burst	
2014	Naruto Shippuden: Ultimate Ninja Storm Revolution	Naruto Uzumaki	English dub	
2016	Naruto Shippuden: Ultimate Ninja Storm 4	Naruto Uzumaki	English dub, with Road to Boruto expansion	
2017	Minecraft: Story Mode Season 2	PorkChop		
2018	Naruto to Boruto: Shinobi Striker	Naruto Uzumaki	English dub	
2023	Hellboy Web of Wyrd	Skuld		

== Awards and nominations ==
Year	Award	Category	Work	Result
2005	Annie Awards	Voice Acting in an Animated Television Production	Jakers! The Adventures of Piggley Winks	Nominated
2006	Daytime Emmy Awards	Outstanding Performer in an Animated Program	Jakers! The Adventures of Piggley Winks	Won
2007	Daytime Emmy Awards	Outstanding Performer in an Animated Program	Jakers! The Adventures of Piggley Winks	Nominated
