= Long time no see (disambiguation) =

"Long time no see" is an English expression used as a greeting by people who have not seen each other for a while.

Long time no see may also refer to:

- "Long Time No See", episode of ABC television sitcom George Lopez
- Long Time No See (album), an album by Chico De Barge
- Long Time No See (5566 album), an album by 5566
- Long Time No See (FM album), an album by FM
- Long Time No See (novel), a novel by Susan Isaacs
- "Long Time No See", a song by Jat Chou from the 2010 album The Era
- "Long Time No See: Jiraiya Returns!", episode of anime series Naruto
- "Long Time, No See" (Staged), a 2021 television episode
