= Naruto: Clash of Ninja =

Fighting video game series

- Genres: Fighting, role-playing
- Developer: Eighting
- Publishers: D3 Publisher, Tomy, Namco Bandai
- Platforms: GameCube, Wii
- First release: Naruto: Clash of Ninja; April 11, 2003
- Latest release: Naruto Shippūden: Gekitō Ninja Taisen! Special; December 2, 2010
- Parent series: Naruto video games

Naruto: Clash of Ninja, released in Japan as Naruto: Gekitō Ninja Taisen! (NARUTO(ナルト) 激闘忍者大戦!), is a series of 3D cel-shaded fighting games based on the manga and anime series Naruto by Masashi Kishimoto. They are developed by Eighting and published by D3 Publisher and Tomy. The series began with four GameCube games, with the first two available internationally and the last two released exclusively in Japan, before splitting into two parallel Wii-exclusive follow-up series: the Gekitō Ninja Taisen EX tetralogy released exclusively in Japan and its international counterpart, the Clash of Ninja: Revolution trilogy. The two Wii series share the same gameplay mechanics, but differ with respect to content and characters, with the international Revolution series being based on a localized version of the Naruto anime series. The first half of the original series and the entire Revolution trilogy are available in North America and Europe, (although the first Clash of Ninja wasn't released in the latter) the first two Revolution games are available in Australasia and all games in the series except the Revolution trilogy are available in Japan.

Each installment of the series has had numerous methods of play with varying types of modes. New games have introduced additional modes that appear in subsequent games. The player directly controls a character taken from the Naruto series, and uses their unique abilities to battle and defeat an opponent. New games in the series include more of the Naruto plotline in a story mode, and it tends to stay true to the source material. As a result, the character selection generally increases with each installment due to the inclusion of more of the Naruto plotline, with some exceptions. With the final Revolution game and the entire EX series incorporating Naruto: Shippūden, the second part of the Naruto series, many of the characters have been substantially redesigned, and the selection correspondingly limited. Reactions to early installments were mixed, while later titles have been received more positively, with many praising the simple and easy-to-learn fighting system while others lambasting the fighting system, and the lack of significant unlockable content.

== Gameplay ==
In each game of the series, the player controls one of many characters directly based on their counterparts in the Naruto anime and manga. As in practically all fighting games, the player then pits their character against another character controlled by the game's AI or by another player, depending on the mode that the player is in. The objective of each game is to reduce the opponent's health to zero using basic attacks and special techniques unique to each character that are derived from the source material. For instance, Naruto Uzumaki can use his signature Shadow Clone Jutsu, (影分身の術, Kage Bunshin no Jutsu; English manga: "Art of the Shadow Doppelganger") and Rock Lee utilizes many of his Strong Fist style techniques. Characters have available a chakra bar, which depletes upon the execution of a special technique. Each game in the series also possesses numerous modes that offer different styles of play. The game's story mode follows the plot from the anime and manga, with a versus mode pitting two players against each other also included. Each game in the series adds new modes, as well as incorporating new features into the game. Early games feature unlocking characters by using a Shop and obtaining money in fights. Most of the games feature an 'Omake' bonus section which contains music, sound effects, and character models. All games in both Wii series take advantage of the Wii Remote's versatility and motion controls, as well as the console's backwards compatibility, to provide multiple control schemes, allowing players to perform gestures to execute certain attacks with the Wii Remote and Nunchuk, or use traditional pad controls with the Wii Remote held sideways, the Classic Controller or the GameCube controller.

== Naruto: Clash of Ninja/Gekitō Ninja Taisen! (GameCube series) ==
=== Naruto: Clash of Ninja ===
Naruto: Clash of Ninja, known in Japan as Naruto: Gekitō Ninja Taisen! (ナルト-激闘忍者大戦!, lit. Naruto: Great Ninja Battle!), is the first installment of the Clash of Ninja series and the first Naruto game released in Japan and North America. It has ten characters and was released in Japan on April 11, 2003. The game was announced along with its sequel, Clash of Ninja 2, on October 27, 2005, for a 2006 release in North America, which was released on March 7, 2006. The game's plot follows from Naruto's graduation from the academy and the first major battle.

=== Naruto: Clash of Ninja 2 ===
Naruto: Clash of Ninja 2
- Developer: Eighting
- Publishers: JP/NA: Tomy; EU: Nintendo
- Series: Naruto: Clash of Ninja
- Platform: GameCube
- Release: JP: December 4, 2003; NA: September 26, 2006; EU: November 24, 2006
- Genre: Fighting game
- Modes: Single-player, multiplayer

Naruto: Clash of Ninja 2, known as Naruto: Gekitō Ninja Taisen! 2 (NARUTO(ナルト) 激闘忍者大戦! 2, lit. Naruto: Great Ninja Battle! 2), in Japan, and Naruto: Clash of Ninja European Version in Europe, is the second installment of the series. It was released in Japan on December 4, 2003. It was announced alongside its predecessor, Clash of Ninja, for a 2006 release in North America and has 22 characters which was then released on September 26, 2006. The game follows the plot of the series, in story mode, starting from Naruto's graduation from the Ninja Academy until the end of the Chunin Exam. The game retains the characters from the first installment and added characters from the Chunin Exam arc. This entry allows four players to fight in multiplayer at the same time. Unlockable features in this game are acquired by accomplishing certain tasks to add them to the game's shop, and then using money won from fights to buy access to the features.

=== Naruto: Gekitō Ninja Taisen! 3 ===
Naruto: Gekitō Ninja Taisen! 3
- Developer: Eighting
- Publisher: Tomy
- Series: Naruto: Clash of Ninja
- Platform: GameCube
- Release: JP: November 20, 2004
- Genre: Fighting game
- Modes: Single-player, multiplayer

Naruto: Gekitō Ninja Taisen! 3 (NARUTO(ナルト) 激闘忍者大戦! 3, lit. Naruto: Great Ninja Battle! 3), is the third installment of this series. The game was announced on August 3, 2004, and released in Japan on November 20, 2004. The game covers the events of the anime from the Chunin Exam to the Search for Tsunade arc. This installment introduces the ability to change forms during combat and gives some characters a second special attack. Also, the game adds on to the tag-team mode from Clash of Ninja 2, granting the player the ability to use team specials. While this game was released exclusively in Japan, it was later given an updated port under the name Naruto: Clash of Ninja Revolution with fewer characters and features.

=== Naruto: Gekitō Ninja Taisen! 4 ===
Naruto: Gekitō Ninja Taisen! 4
- Developer: Eighting
- Publisher: Tomy
- Series: Naruto: Clash of Ninja
- Platform: GameCube
- Release: JP: November 21, 2005
- Genre: Fighting game
- Modes: Single-player, multiplayer

Naruto: Gekitō Ninja Taisen! 4 (NARUTO(ナルト) 激闘忍者大戦! 4, lit. Naruto: Great Ninja Battle! 4) is the fourth installment of this series. It was released in Japan in November 2005. It covers the events from the Sasuke Retrieval arc. Most noticeably, the game removes the shop feature and focuses on meeting certain criteria in the game's new Mission mode to unlock content. Mission mode pits the player against increasingly stronger opponents under specific circumstances and with different methods of winning in order to complete each mission. The new game called Three-Man Squad Mode, is selecting 3 characters to fight 3 opponents. This game was released exclusively in Japan.

== Naruto: Clash of Ninja Revolution (Non-Japanese/International Wii ports and series) ==
=== Naruto: Clash of Ninja Revolution ===
Naruto: Clash of Ninja Revolution
- Developer: Eighting
- Publisher: Tomy
- Series: Naruto: Clash of Ninja
- Platform: Wii
- Release: NA: October 23, 2007; EU: March 28, 2008; AU: May 8, 2008
- Genre: Fighting game
- Modes: Single-player, multiplayer

Naruto: Clash of Ninja Revolution is the third Clash of Ninja game available in North America and was released on October 23, 2007, and has 20 characters. Clash of Ninja Revolution covers the events of the Chunin Exam arc to the end of the Search for Tsunade arc. Clash of Ninja Revolution is essentially an enhanced port of Naruto: Gekitou Ninja Taisen 3 but uses the same gameplay engine as Gekitō Ninja Taisen! EX. The game utilizes the Nunchuk accessory for the Wii Remote, for basic attacks and for special attacks that require specific movements from both items. It was nominated as Wii's Best Fighter for 2007.

=== Naruto: Clash of Ninja Revolution 2 ===
Naruto: Clash of Ninja Revolution 2
- Developer: Eighting
- Publisher: Tomy
- Series: Naruto: Clash of Ninja
- Platform: Wii
- Release: NA: October 21, 2008; EU: February 13, 2009
- Genre: Fighting game
- Modes: Single-player, multiplayer

Naruto: Clash of Ninja Revolution 2 is the fourth North American installment of the Clash of Ninja series and the second installment in the Revolution series. It was released in the US on October 21, 2008, and in Europe on February 13, 2009, and has 35 characters. The game features an original storyline that was never shown in the anime or manga, set after Sasuke Retrieval arc. In addition, the game introduces new gameplay modes, such as a new Mission Mode with 300 missions, with its gameplay as ten missions for each character; and bring back other modes, such as Oboro mode, now renamed Kumite Mode, among other minor tweaks. All control schemes from the original are available, and the game features a reworked team battle mode, although online play was ruled out in favor of balancing out the characters and perfecting the game's story mode. The game introduces for the North American audience the hand seal mechanism from Naruto Shippūden: Gekitō Ninja Taisen! EX 2, which characters can use to gain chakra or boost their attack power temporarily. It was nominated for Best Fighting Game on the Wii by IGN in its 2008 video game awards.

=== Naruto Shippuden: Clash of Ninja Revolution 3 ===
Naruto Shippuden: Clash of Ninja Revolution 3
- Developer: Eighting
- Publisher: Tomy
- Series: Naruto: Clash of Ninja
- Platform: Wii
- Release: NA: November 17, 2009; EU: April 9, 2010
- Genre: Fighting game
- Modes: Single-player, multiplayer

Naruto Shippuden: Clash of Ninja Revolution 3 is the fifth North American installment in the Clash of Ninja series and is the third installment to Revolution series. It was released in America on November 17, 2009, and on April 9, 2010, in PAL territories, as Naruto Shippuden: Clash of Ninja Revolution 3 European Version. Clash of Ninja Revolution 3 covers the Kazekage Rescue arc and features 40 playable characters, and fighting environments as well as Wi-fi multiplayer matches, co-op matches, latent ninja powers and an overhauled combat system. This game has a new feature: the ability to call on your teammate in team battle to help. The PAL version features minor bug fixes, minor character re-balancing and also Japanese voice acting everywhere but for the main menu and the Story Mode cutscenes are only in English.

== Naruto Shippūden: Gekitō Ninja Taisen! EX (Japan-exclusive Wii series) ==
=== Naruto Shippūden: Gekitō Ninja Taisen! EX ===
Naruto Shippūden: Gekitō Ninja Taisen! EX
- Developer: Eighting
- Publisher: Takara Tomy
- Series: Naruto: Clash of Ninja
- Platform: Wii
- Release: JP: February 22, 2007
- Genre: Fighting game
- Modes: Single-player, multiplayer

Naruto Shippūden: Gekitō Ninja Taisen! EX (NARUTO(ナルト) 疾風伝 激闘忍者大戦! EX, lit. Naruto Shippūden: Great Ninja Battle! EX) is the fifth installment of the Clash of Ninja series only for Japan. This game is the first game in the series to be released for the Wii, and was released in Japan on December 28, 2006. The game uses the Wii Remote by waving the controller in different directions, but the GameCube controller and the Wii Classic controller can be used as well. The game takes place during the Naruto: Shippūden series, specifically the Kazekage Rescue arc. The game replaces the cast of characters in the previous games with a new set based specifically on the Shippūden series.

=== Naruto Shippūden: Gekitō Ninja Taisen! EX 2 ===
Naruto Shippūden: Gekitō Ninja Taisen! EX 2
- Developer: Eighting
- Publisher: Takara Tomy
- Series: Naruto: Clash of Ninja
- Platform: Wii
- Release: JP: November 29, 2007
- Genre: Fighting game
- Modes: Single-player, multiplayer

Naruto Shippūden: Gekitō Ninja Taisen! EX 2 (NARUTO(ナルト) 疾風伝 激闘忍者大戦! EX 2, lit. Naruto Shippūden: Great Ninja Battle! EX 2) is the sixth installment of the Clash of Ninja series only for Japan. It was released on November 29, 2007. This is the first Naruto Shippūden game to feature Sasuke Uchiha as a playable character. and covers Kazekage Rescue up to the Tenchi Bridge Reconnaissance arc. All characters are playable in their timeskip forms, while Naruto and Sasuke are also playable in their pre-timeskip forms. Two new features are included in the game. The first, "Danger Zones", are hazards on stages that can hurt the player's character when encountered. (for example, spikes on cliff walls) The second feature included is a new hand seal mechanism, which can be used by the player to raise their character's attack power or chakra, and for some characters, an in-game transformation.

=== Naruto Shippūden: Gekitō Ninja Taisen! EX 3 ===
Naruto Shippūden: Gekitō Ninja Taisen! EX 3
- Developer: Eighting
- Publisher: Takara Tomy
- Series: Naruto: Clash of Ninja
- Platform: Wii
- Release: JP: November 27, 2008
- Genre: Fighting game
- Modes: Single-player, multiplayer

Naruto Shippūden: Gekitō Ninja Taisen! EX 3 (NARUTO(ナルト) 疾風伝 激闘忍者大戦! EX 3, lit. Naruto Shippūden: Great Ninja Battle! EX 3) is the seventh installment of the Clash of Ninja series only for Japan. It was released on November 27, 2008, in Japan. A new mode called 'Hurricane Clash mode' has been added, where players take on hordes of ninja in levels based on the series locations. Another feature was added, called "Senzai Ninriki", in which players gain a new power when they reach Critical Mode, and there is also a tag team mode. This game includes an original Naruto: Shippuden story line and the beginning of the Hidan and Kakuzu arc.

=== Naruto Shippūden: Gekitō Ninja Taisen! Special ===
Naruto Shippūden: Gekitō Ninja Taisen! Special
- Developer: Eighting
- Publisher: Takara Tomy
- Series: Naruto: Clash of Ninja
- Platform: Wii
- Release: JP: December 2, 2010
- Genre: Fighting game
- Modes: Single-player, multiplayer

Naruto Shippūden: Gekitō Ninja Taisen! Special (NARUTO(ナルト) 疾風伝 激闘忍者大戦! Special, lit. Naruto Shippūden: Great Ninja Battle! Special) is the eighth installment of the Clash of Ninja series only for Japan that features an updated character roster, jutsus, a substitution bar, and online play, and the new story mode called GNT Road, the game can be select the characters to complete the mission to unlock all characters. It was released on December 2, 2010, in Japan, and is thus the final game of the series.

== Playable characters ==
The characters in the Clash of Ninja series are directly based upon characters taken from the Naruto anime. Each game introduces a new set of characters, with their appearance and abilities derived directly from the source material. As Naruto Shippūden: Gekito Ninja Taisen! EX and its sequels take place during Naruto: Shippūden, the characters' appearance is significantly different. As such, many characters before Shippūden differ drastically from their older counterparts.

Character	1	2	3	4	EX	Revolution	EX 2	Revolution 2	EX 3	Revolution 3	Special
Naruto Uzumaki	✓	✓	✓	✓	✓	✓	✓ ^{2}	✓	✓ ^{2}	✓	✓
Nine-Tailed Naruto	✓	✓	✓ ^{1}	✓ ^{1}	✗	✓ ^{1}	✓ ^{1}	✓ ^{1}	✓ ^{1}	✗	✗
One-Tailed Kyuubi/Ultimate Nine-Tailed Naruto	✗	✗	✗	✓	✓ ^{1}	✗	✗	✓	✗	✓ ^{1}	✗
Three-Tailed Kyuubi Naruto	✗	✗	✗	✗	✗	✗	✓ ^{1}	✗	✓ ^{1}	✗	✓ ^{1}
Sage Mode Naruto	✗	✗	✗	✗	✗	✗	✗	✗	✗	✗	✓
Sasuke Uchiha	✓	✓	✓	✓	✗	✓	✓	✓	✓	✓	✓
Sharingan Sasuke	✗	✓	✓ ^{1}	✓ ^{1}	✗	✓ ^{1}	✓ ^{1} ^{2}	✓ ^{1}	✓ ^{1} ^{2}	✓ ^{3}	✓ ^{3}
Mangekyo Sharingan Sasuke	✗	✗	✗	✗	✗	✗	✗	✗	✗	✗	✓
Second State Sasuke	✗	✗	✗	✓	✗	✗	✗	✓	✗	✗	✗
Sakura Haruno	✓	✓	✓	✓	✓	✓	✓	✓	✓	✓	✓
Kakashi Hatake	✓	✓	✓	✓	✓	✓	✓	✓	✓	✓	✓
Sharingan Kakashi	✓	✓	✓ ^{1}	✓ ^{1}	✓ ^{1}	✓ ^{1}	✓ ^{1}	✓ ^{1}	✓ ^{1}	✓ ^{1}	✓ ^{1}
Anbu Kakashi	✗	✗	✗	✗	✗	✗	✗	✗	✗	✓	✓
Sai	✗	✗	✗	✗	✗	✗	✓	✗	✓	✓	✓
Yamato	✗	✗	✗	✗	✗	✗	✓	✗	✓	✓	✓
Rock Lee	✓	✓	✓	✓	✓	✓	✓	✓	✓	✓	✓
Eight-Gates Lee	✗	✓ ^{1}	✓ ^{1}	✓ ^{1}	✓ ^{1}	✓ ^{1}	✓ ^{1}	✓ ^{1}	✓ ^{1}	✓ ^{1}	✓ ^{1}
Neji Hyuga	✗	✓	✓	✓	✓	✓	✓	✓	✓	✓	✓
Tenten	✗	✗	✓	✓	✓	✓	✓	✓	✓	✓	✓
Might Guy	✗	✓	✓	✓	✓	✓	✓	✓	✓	✓	✓
Choji Akimichi	✗	✗	✓	✓	✗	✗	✓	✓	✓	✓	✓
Shikamaru Nara	✗	✓	✓	✓	✗	✓	✓	✓	✓	✓	✓
Ino Yamanaka	✗	✓	✓	✓	✗	✓	✗	✓	✗	✗	✓
Asuma Sarutobi	✗	✗	✗	✗	✗	✗	✓	✓	✓	✓	✓
Kiba Inuzuka	✗	✓	✓	✓	✗	✗	✓	✓	✓	✓	✓
Akamaru	✗	✓	✓	✓	✗	✗	✗	✗	✗	✗	✗
Shino Aburame	✗	✗	✓	✓	✗	✓	✓	✓	✓	✓	✓
Hinata Hyuga	✗	✓	✓	✓	✗	✓	✓	✓	✓	✓	✓
Awakened Hinata	✗	✗	✗	✓	✗	✗	✗	✓	✗	✓ ^{1}	✓ ^{1}
Kurenai Yuhi	✗	✗	✗	✗	✗	✗	✗	✓	✓	✓	✓
Gaara (Fifth Kazekage)	✗	✓	✓	✓	✓	✓	✓	✓	✓	✓	✓
Kankuro	✗	✓	✓	✓	✓	✓	✓	✓	✓	✓	✓
Crow	✗	✓	✓	✓	✗	✗	✗	✗	✗	✗	✗
Temari	✗	✗	✓	✓	✓	✓	✓	✓	✓	✓	✓
Baki	✗	✗	✗	✗	✗	✗	✗	✓	✓	✓	✓
Jiraiya	✗	✗	✓	✓	✗	✓	✓	✓	✓	✓	✓
Orochimaru	✗	✓	✓	✓	✗	✓	✓	✓	✓	✓	✓
Tsunade (Fifth Hokage)	✗	✗	✓	✓	✗	✓	✓	✓	✓	✓	✓
Granny Chiyo	✗	✗	✗	✗	✗	✗	✗	✗	✗	✓	✓
Hiruzen Sarutobi (Third Hokage)	✗	✗	✓	✓	✗	✗	✗	✗	✗	✗	✗
Minato Namikaze (Fourth Hokage)	✗	✗	✗	✗	✗	✗	✗	✗	✗	✗	✓
Iruka Umino	✓	✓	✓	✓	✗	✗	✗	✗	✗	✗	✗
Mizuki	✗	✓	✓	✓	✗	✗	✗	✗	✗	✗	✗
Anko Mitarashi	✗	✗	✓	✓	✗	✗	✗	✓	✗	✓	✓
Curse-Mark Anko	✗	✗	✗	✗	✗	✗	✗	✗	✗	✓ ^{1}	✓ ^{1}
Killer Bee	✗	✗	✗	✗	✗	✗	✗	✗	✗	✗	✓
Eight-Tailed Bee	✗	✗	✗	✗	✗	✗	✗	✗	✗	✗	✓ ^{1}
Ay (Fourth Raikage)	✗	✗	✗	✗	✗	✗	✗	✗	✗	✗	✓
Yugao Uzuki	✗	✗	✗	✗	✗	✗	✗	✓	✓	✓	✓
Komachi	✗	✗	✗	✗	✗	✗	✗	✓	✗	✓	✗
Towa	✗	✗	✗	✗	✗	✗	✗	✓	✗	✓	✗
Zabuza Momochi	✓	✓	✓	✓	✗	✗	✗	✗	✗	✗	✗
Haku	✓	✓	✓	✓	✗	✗	✗	✗	✗	✗	✗
Itachi Uchiha	✗	✗	✓	✓	✓	✓	✓	✓	✓	✓	✓
Kisame Hoshigaki	✗	✗	✗	✓	✓	✓	✓	✓	✓	✓	✓
True Sasori	✗	✗	✗	✗	✗	✗	✓	✗	✓	✓	✓
Sasori in Hiruko	✗	✗	✗	✗	✓	✗	✓	✗	✓	✓	✓
Deidara	✗	✗	✗	✗	✓	✗	✓	✗	✓	✓	✓
Hidan	✗	✗	✗	✗	✗	✗	✗	✗	✓	✓	✓
Kakuzu	✗	✗	✗	✗	✗	✗	✗	✗	✓	✓	✓
Jirobo	✗	✗	✗	✓	✗	✗	✗	✗	✗	✗	✗
Kidomaru	✗	✗	✗	✓	✗	✗	✗	✗	✗	✗	✗
Sakon and Ukon	✗	✗	✗	✓	✗	✗	✗	✗	✗	✗	✗
Tayuya	✗	✗	✗	✓	✗	✗	✗	✗	✗	✗	✗
Kimimaro	✗	✗	✗	✓	✗	✗	✗	✗	✗	✗	✗
Kabuto Yakushi	✗	✗	✗	✓	✗	✗	✓	✓	✓	✓	✓
Bando	✗	✗	✗	✗	✗	✗	✗	✓	✗	✓	✗
Kagura	✗	✗	✗	✗	✗	✗	✗	✓	✗	✓	✗
Total	10	24	33	43	17	24	33	39	38	46	49

Notes:

1. This marks an in-game transformation of said character.
2. This marks a character playable in both post and pre-timeskip forms.
3. Sharingan (写輪眼; lit. 'Copy Wheel Eye", English manga: "Mirror Wheel Eye') is always active.

== Reception ==
Clash of Ninja has received mixed reactions from critics. Metacritic, a website that compiles scores from numerous video game publications, gave Clash of Ninja a 72/100. IGN lauded the game's battle system as "very balanced, amazingly quick, and still a lot of fun." In addition, IGN commented on Clash of Ninja's "impressive visuals" and "strong audio." Conversely, GameSpot provided a more negative review, deriding the game's different modes as "seriously boring and predictable," as well as criticizing the lack of significant differences in the playing style of the game's characters. G4's X-Play gave Clash of Ninja two out of five stars, lambasting the fighting engine as "ridiculously basic," and "shallow." It also criticized the lack of a story or use of cutscenes or extras. GameSpy also commented on this, noting that "considering the charm of the source material, [the game] is really a disappointment."

Critical reaction for Clash of Ninja 2 has been similar to its predecessor, with mixed opinions from critics. Metacritic compiled a "universal score" of 74/100 from 22 reviews for Clash of Ninja 2. X-Play criticized the game for its limited two-player game and similar fighting styles of the characters. They did, however, praise the game's four-player mode and animation, commenting that it "[nailed] the look of the cartoon characters," and referred specifically to the characters' special techniques animation as "remarkably impressive." IGN agreed with this assessment, noting the game's "sharper look" and "overall depth." GameSpot, echoing its sentiments with Clash of Ninja, called the fighting system "simple," to the point that it made the game's expanded roster "irrelevant," and the game "not very satisfying to play."Although GameSpot remarked favorably on the game's "high-energy Japanese-themed background music," it criticized the "obnoxiously repetitive" voice acting, and its constant presence in the game. GameSpot went on to remark that Clash of Ninja 2 "ultimately [did] little to improve upon the original," and felt more reminiscent of an "upgraded game than a true sequel." IGN heavily disagreed, claiming that although the game was similar to the original, it had a "ton of added depth" in the fighting system and character options. IGN lauded the game's characters' "depth and complexity" as "awesome," and "a blast to play." GameSpy focused on the game's four player multiplayer, comparing it to the best-selling Super Smash Bros. Melee and that it was a "recipe for plenty of fun." Like its predecessor, Clash of Ninja 2 achieved the 250,000 unit sales benchmark, earning it a spot in Nintendo's Player's Choice games.

As with previous incarnations of the series, Clash of Ninja Revolution received a high score from IGN, who noted the game as "fun whether you're a fan of the anime or not", and went on to name it the best Wii fighting game to date, giving it an 8.4 as the final score. The publication Nintendo Power gave Clash of Ninja Revolution a 7 out of 10, calling the game a mere roster update from previous versions. However, Metacritic gave the game, just like the previous games on their site, "mixed or average reviews" with a 74/100 from 23 critics.

Nintendo Power also gave the sequel, Clash of Ninja Revolution 2, an 8 out of 10 for its new modes and refreshed gameplay, and also called Clash of Ninja Revolution 2 the "best Naruto fighting game for Nintendo to date." IGN gave the game an 8.2 out of 10, saying "new characters, new stages, same feel. Fans will love it, but not everyone will want to buy it all over again." Like Naruto: Clash of Ninja and Clash of Ninja Revolution, Clash of Ninja Revolution 2 received "mixed or average reviews" on Metacritic with a critic's score of 74/100

IGN gave Clash of Ninja Revolution 3 an 8 out of 10, praising game to have the most balanced cast of characters and best game mechanics of the series. IGN also criticized Story Mode and laggy online play. However, Metacritic gave this game "mixed or average reviews" with on a score of 74/100 (similar to Clash of Ninja 2, Clash of Ninja Revolution, and Clash of Revolution 2) from 22 critics.

== See also ==
- Naruto
- List of Naruto video games
