= Pass or Fail =

Pass or Fail may refer to:

- Pass or fail, the result of an exam
- "Pass or Fail" (Doctor in the House), a 1969 television episode
- "Pass or Fail: Survival Test", a 2002 episode of the television series Naruto
- "Pass/Fail", a 2010 episode of the television series Heroes
