= Naruto: Clash of Ninja (video game) =

2003 video game

- North American box art
- Developer: Eighting
- Publisher: Tomy
- Composer: Shinji Hosoe
- Series: Naruto: Clash of Ninja
- Platform: GameCube
- Release: JP: April 11, 2003; NA: March 7, 2006
- Genre: Fighting
- Modes: Single-player, multiplayer

Naruto: Clash of Ninja (NARUTO(ナルト) 激闘忍者大戦!, Naruto: Gekitō Ninja Taisen; lit. "Naruto: Great Ninja Battle") is a 3-D cel-shaded fighting game developed by Eighting and published by D3 Publisher and Tomy. It is based on the popular anime and manga series Naruto by Masashi Kishimoto, and the first installment of the Naruto: Clash of Ninja video game series. In the game, players pit two characters from the Naruto manga and anime series against each other, using basic attacks and special techniques to defeat their opponent in one of the game's modes.

Clash of Ninja was originally released in Japan on April 11, 2003, and was subsequently released in North America on March 7, 2006, with the only major difference being the voice-overs by the English voice actors from the Naruto anime. The game received mixed critical reviews, with some praising the combat for being easy-to-learn and entertaining, though some lambasted its simplicity and the lack of significant unlockable content.

== Gameplay ==
Over the course of the game, the player controls one of a select few characters directly based upon their counterparts in the Naruto anime and manga. Clash of Ninja is a member of the fighting game genre; the player pits their character against another character controlled by the game's AI or by another player, depending on the mode that the player is in. The objective is to reduce the opponent's health to zero using basic attacks and special techniques unique to each character that are derived from techniques they use in the Naruto anime or manga. For instance, Naruto Uzumaki is able to use his signature Shadow Clone Jutsu (影分身の術, Kage Bunshin no Jutsu; English manga: "Art of the Shadow Doppelganger"), and Rock Lee utilizes many of his Strong Fist style techniques. To use these techniques, characters have available a chakra bar, which depletes upon the execution of a special technique, and regenerates over time. In the game's numerous modes, the player can choose from different styles of play. The game's story mode follows the plot from the anime and manga, and a versus mode pitting two players against each other also included.

== Development ==
The original Japanese version of Clash of Ninja, the first installment of the Clash of Ninja series, was developed by Eighting and published by D3 Publisher and Tomy, and released on April 11, 2003. On October 27, 2005, both Clash of Ninja and its sequel, Clash of Ninja 2, were confirmed for a 2006 release in North America. The game has a total of ten characters that come from the Land of Waves arc of the series (covers the events up to episode 19 in the anime). Masato Toyoshima, one of the executives of Eighting, stated that the game was designed to appeal to both casual and hardcore gamers. The only significant difference made by Eighting in the development between the English variant and its Japanese counterpart were the voice-overs, which were done by the English voice actors in the Naruto anime. Toyoshima claimed that the development team was especially "proud that [they] were able to accomplish" creating the cel-shaded graphics that closely matched the scenes in the Naruto anime and manga.

== Reception ==
Reception

Aggregate scores
| Aggregator | Score |
|---|---|
| GameRankings | 67.35% |
| Metacritic | 72 out of 100 |

Review scores
| Publication | Score |
|---|---|
| 1Up.com | B+ |
| GamePro | 4/5 |
| GameSpot | 6.3 out of 10 |
| GameSpy | 3/5 |
| GamesRadar+ | 4/5 |
| GameZone | 6.9 out of 10 |
| IGN | 7.8 out of 10 |
| Nintendo Power | 7 out of 10 |
| Nintendo World Report | 7 out of 10 |
| X-Play | 2/5 |

Clash of Ninja has received mixed reactions from several video game publications. GameRankings gave it a score of 67.35%, while Metacritic gave it 72 out of 100. In Japan, Famitsu gave the game a score of 31 out of 40. The game sold well in North America, becoming part of Nintendo's set of Player's Choice games, which lowers the retail price to $19.99 if the game has sold at least 250,000 copies.

The gameplay was subject to mixed opinions. IGN lauded the game's battle system as "very balanced, amazingly quick, and still a lot of fun," but accepted that the battle designs were "a bit basic." GameSpot provided a more negative review, deriding the game's different modes as "seriously boring and predictable," as well as criticizing the lack of significant differences in the playing style of the game's characters. GameSpot characterized the voice acting as having "some of the worst stereotypes of anime voice acting," and noted the lack of unlockable items and other incentives to continue play. G4's X-Play gave Clash of Ninja two out of five stars, lambasting the fighting engine as "one of the laziest, most oversimplified engines ever seen in a 3D fighting game," and "ridiculously basic." X-Play also criticized the lack of a significant plot in the story mode and the lack of use of cutscenes or unlockable items. GameSpy commented on this, noting that "considering the charm of the source material, [the game] is really a disappointment".

The cel-shaded graphics and audio received acclaim from reviewers, with GameSpot praising the game's "smooth, powerful-looking animations," as well as extolling how "powerful sound effects and a driving soundtrack" contributed to the game's overall feel. GameSpy noted that "[the game] manages to shine in the visual department," making note of how the varied graphical details were "fluid and precise and doesn't ever slow down or become choppy." X-Play, however, considered the graphics "underwhelming," criticizing the lack of significant usage of animation and cinematic scenes, and remarking that the graphics "follow the rest of the game's lead."

== See also ==
- Naruto: Clash of Ninja (series)
- List of Naruto video games
