= Naruto season 2 =

Naruto
- Season 2
- First Japanese home media volume cover of the season
- No. of episodes: 48

Release
- Original network: TV Tokyo
- Original release: June 4, 2003 – May 12, 2004

Season chronology
- ← Previous; Season 1 Next → Season 3

The second season of the Naruto anime television series, labelled as the "2nd Stage" in the Japanese DVD release, is directed by Hayato Date, and produced by Studio Pierrot and TV Tokyo. Based on Masashi Kishimoto's manga series of the same name, the season follows Naruto Uzumaki and fellow genin-ranked ninja participating the Chūnin Exams, surviving Orochimaru's invasion of the Hidden Leaf Village and confronting Gaara in the Leaf Forest. The season ran from June 4, 2003, to May 12, 2004, on TV Tokyo and its affiliates, consisting of 48 episodes. (Note: The number of episodes are based on how Sony / Aniplex divides the seasons (stages) of Naruto in its original Japanese home media release. The number of seasons and how many episodes each has varies depending on the series distributor. Some other ways the first season could be split based on streaming services and home video releases are as follows: Viz Media and Hulu season 2: Eps. 53–106 (54 episodes); Netflix and Crunchyroll season 2: Eps. 27–52 (26 episodes); Netflix season 3: Eps. 53–80 (28 episodes); Crunchyroll season 3: Eps. 53–78 (26 episodes); Apple TV+ season 2: Eps. 58–100 (43 episodes))

The English dub aired on both Cartoon Network's Toonami and YTV's Bionix programming blocks from June 3, 2006, to April 14, 2007. The season's episodes ran on Adult Swim's relaunched Toonami block in a completely uncut format from December 1, 2012, to November 30, 2013. After the 52nd episode, it was removed from the schedule rotation to make room for its successor series, Naruto: Shippuden.

Sony Pictures Entertainment collected the episodes in a total of twelve DVD volumes under the name "2nd Stage", between January and December 1, 2004. Episodes from this season were released on by Viz Media between the ninth and twenty-first DVD volumes from the series, while several uncut DVD boxes have also been released.

Seven pieces of theme music are used for the episodes in Japanese version; three opening themes and four closing themes. The first opening theme is "Haruka Kanata" (遥か彼方; lit. Far Away) by Asian Kung-Fu Generation (used for episodes 36 to 53), "Kanashimi Wo Yasashisa Ni" (悲しみをやさしさに; lit. Sadness into Kindness) by Little By Little (used for episodes 54 to 77), and "Go!!!" by Flow (used for episodes 78 to 83). The four closing themes are "Harmonia" by Rythem (used for episodes 36 to 51), "Viva★Rock" by Orange Range (used for episodes 52 to 64), "Alive" by Raico (used for episodes 65 to 77), and "Ima Made Nando Mo" (今まで何度も; lit. Many Times Before) by The Mass Missile (used for episodes 78 to 83). The opening theme for the English airing are "Rise" by Jeremy Sweet and Ian Nickus (used until episode 52), "Haruka Kanata" by Asian Kung-Fu Generation (used for episodes 53 to 80), and is then replaced by "GO!!!" in the same way as the Japanese version, while the closing theme is an instrumental version of "Rise", which is used in all episodes.

== Episodes ==
No. overall	No. in season	Title	Directed by	Written by	Animation directed by	Original release date	English air date
Chūnin Exams
36	1	"Clone vs. Clone: Mine Are Better Than Yours!"; Transliteration: "Bunshin Taiketsu! Ore ga Shuyakudattebayo!" (Japanese: 分身対決！オレが主役だってばよ！)	Yuki Hayashi	Kou Hei Mushi	Hiromi Okazaki	June 4, 2003	June 3, 2006
The team realizes they are in another genjutsu. To draw out the assailants, Naruto Uzumaki summons the clones and fights the enemy ones all night. When the Rain Genin believe that Team 7 exhausted from combat, Sasuke Uchiha, Sakura Haruno, and Kabuto Yakushi corner them. After a brief struggle, Naruto knocks out the enemies and takes the scroll, at which point they head to the tower and meet with Kabuto's team. Unknown to Team 7, Kabuto submits the data for Orochimaru.
37	2	"Surviving the Cut! The Rookie Nine Together Again!"; Transliteration: "Daini Shiken Toppa! Seizoroi Rūkī Nain!" (Japanese: 第二試験突破！勢ぞろいルーキーナイン！)	Directed by : Takeyuki Sadohara; Storyboarded by : Hitoyuki Matsui	Akatsuki Yamatoya	Jong Ki Choi	June 11, 2003	June 10, 2006
Team 7 opens its scrolls inside the tower, summoning Iruka Umino to inform them that they made it in time. He observes their growth, then allows them to enter the main room, where they meet with the other passing teams: Team 10, Team 8, Team Guy, the Sand Siblings, Kabuto's team, and Team Dosu. Hiruzen Sarutobi briefly speaks about what the exams are all about before entrusting Hayate Gekko to oversee the matches.
38	3	"Narrowing the Field: Sudden Death Elimination!"; Transliteration: "Gōkakusha Nibun no Ichi!? Ikinari Shiai Dattebayo!!" (Japanese: 合格者二分の一!? イキナリ試合だってばよ!!)	Directed by : Hayato Date; Storyboarded by : Hitoyuki Matsui	Satoru Nishizono	Masaru Hyodo	June 18, 2003	June 17, 2006
Hayate reveals that an unusually large number of Genin got through the second stage of the exam. A series of one-on-one preliminary matches will be held to reduce the number of people meaning that there will be a tournament for the next exam eliminating the loser and promoting the victor. Kabuto drops out immediately upon the notice, blaming his withdrawal on an injury sustained from an earlier part of the test. The preliminary matches are randomized with a machine and the dials end at Sasuke Uchiha and Yoroi Akado. Before the battle, Sasuke tells Sakura about the curse mark limiting the amount of chakra.
39	4	"Bushy Brow's Jealousy: Lions Barrage Unleashed!"; Transliteration: "Gejimayu Jerashī! "Shishi Rendan" Tanjō!" (Japanese: ゲジまゆジェラシー！｢獅子連弾｣誕生！)	Directed by : Hiroshi Kimura; Storyboarded by : Ryō Yasumura	Akatsuki Yamatoya	Kazuhisa Kosuge	July 2, 2003	June 24, 2006
Sasuke fights Yoroi, but is handicapped by his inability to use chakra due to the danger of activating the Cursed Seal. Yoroi's ability to absorb chakra gives him an advantage. Sasuke, in the heat of battle, remembers Lee's attack on him and uses it to create his own variant of the taijutsu move: Lion's Barrage. After using the barrage, he manages to suppress his Cursed Seal and wins the exam match. Kakashi Hatake takes Sasuke to an isolated location to hinder the Cursed Seal, before meeting Orochimaru. Back at the tower, Shino Aburame confronts Zaku Abumi.
40	5	"Kakashi and Orochimaru: Face-to-Face!"; Transliteration: "Isshokusokuhatsu!! Kakashi tai Orochimaru" (Japanese: 一触即発!! カカシVS(たい)大蛇丸)	Rion Kujo	Kou Hei Mushi	Yukimaro Ōtsubo	July 9, 2003	July 1, 2006
Kakashi threatens to kill Orochimaru with his Lightning Blade, a threat that Orochimaru takes lightly. Despite this, Orochimaru leaves, with Kakashi terrified at his foolishness. Shino defeats Zaku, before Kankuro starts facing Misumi Tsurugi.
41	6	"Kunoichi Rumble: The Rivals Get Serious!"; Transliteration: "Raibaru Gekitotsu! Otome Gokoro wa Honki Mōdo" (Japanese: ライバル激突！オトメ心は本気モード)	Directed by : Mitsutaka Noshitani; Storyboarded by : Yasuhiro Minami	Michiko Yokote	Akihiro Tsuda	July 16, 2003	July 8, 2006
Kankuro defeats Misumi, by tricking him into attacking his puppet Crow. Though Kankuro has Crow break Misumi's ribs, the opponent survives due to his ability to contort himself. The fourth match is between Sakura Haruno and Ino Yamanaka. After the two exchange insults, they have flash backs from when they were friends, before Sakura was forced to end it after both learn that they each have a crush on Sasuke. Though Ino restrains herself because of their past, she decides to follow Sakura's example.
42	7	"The Ultimate Battle: Cha!"; Transliteration: "Besuto Batoru wa Shānnarō!!" (Japanese: ベストバトルはしゃーんなろー!!)	Masahiko Murata	Michiko Yokote	Yukiko Ban	July 23, 2003	July 15, 2006
Sakura and Ino are evenly matched. They both use illusion clone jutsu, chakra string jutsu and others. In a desperate move, Ino uses her Mind Transfer Jutsu to take control over Sakura's body and have her forfeit. But Naruto's cheering of Sakura allows her Inner Sakura to force Ino out of her body. The two girls having been pushed to their limits, Ino and Sakura decide to end the battle as they charge each other to land a powerful punch on each other. Though Sakura and Ino ended up being both eliminated after a double knockout, the ordeal did rekindle their friendship.
43	8	"Killer Kunoichi and a Shaky Shikamaru"; Transliteration: "Shikamaru Tajitaji!? Kunoichi-tachi no Atsuki Tatakai" (Japanese: シカマルタジタジ!? くの一達の熱き戦い)	Yuki Hayashi	Katsuyuki Sumisawa	Yasuhiko Kanezuka	July 30, 2003	July 15, 2006
On the next match, Tenten's weapon summonings are negated and overwhelmed by Temari's wind-based attacks. Shikamaru Nara and Kin Tsuchi are chosen for the next match. Although Kin ensnares Shikamaru in a genjutsu, he captures her in his Shadow Imitation Technique. He forcefully knocks herself unconscious. The next combatants are randomized putting everyone into awaiting excitements, and Naruto and Kiba are chosen to fight each other.
44	9	"Akamaru Unleashed! Who's Top Dog Now?"; Transliteration: "Akamaru Sansen!! Makeinu wa Dotchida?" (Japanese: 赤丸参戦!! 負け犬はどっちだ？)	Directed by : Masaaki Kumagai; Storyboarded by : Hitoyuki Matsui	Tamotsu Mizukoshi	Hiromi Okazaki	August 6, 2003	July 22, 2006
Kiba quickly embarrasses Naruto by sending him tumbling to the ground with one intense blow but he soon discovers that Naruto will not be taken down so easily. Kiba and his dog Akamaru continue to prove too much for Naruto. He uses his superior strength and speed to dominate the match. Consuming special military pills that enhance their chakra, Kiba and Akamaru use a combination of their speed and special signature Man-Beast Clone Jutsu to overwhelm Naruto.
45	10	"Surprise Attack! Naruto's Secret Weapon!"; Transliteration: "Hinata Sekimen! Kankyaku Anguri, Naruto no Oku no Te" (Japanese: ヒナタ赤面！観客あんぐり、ナルトの奥の手)	Takeyuki Sadohara	Akatsuki Yamatoya	Jong Ki Choi	August 13, 2003	July 29, 2006
As the battle continues, Naruto manages to trick Kiba into knocking Akamaru out. Despite this, Naruto is still at a disadvantage due to Kiba's pill-enhanced chakra as well as his superior strength and speed. Kiba proves to be too fast for Naruto to the point that Naruto does not even have time to perform any jutsu. Using his speed to get behind Naruto, Kiba is about to land a finishing blow. Before making contact, Naruto accidentally farts into his face, stopping him in his tracks. Due to Kiba's greatly enhanced sense of smell, he is overwhelmed by the odor as Naruto defeats him with by using his Shadow Clones in his own version of Sasuke's Lion Barrage: Naruto Uzumaki Barrage.
46	11	"Byakugan Battle: Hinata Grows Bold!"; Transliteration: "Byakugan Kaigen!! Uchiki na Hinata no Daitan Ketsui!" (Japanese: 白眼開眼!! 内気なヒナタの大胆決意！)	Rion Kujo	Akatsuki Yamatoya	Yukimaro Ōtsubo	August 20, 2003	August 5, 2006
The next match is Hinata Hyuga and her older brother Neji, who is revealed to be her cousin from the branch house of the Hyuga clan. Neji intimidates and berates Hinata, by convincing her to forfeit. When Naruto encourages Hinata, she fights back, but gets her internal organs damaged.
47	12	"A Failure Stands Tall!"; Transliteration: "Akogare no Hito no Me no Maede!!" (Japanese: 憧れの人の目の前で!!)	Directed by : Hiroshi Kimura; Storyboarded by : Ryō Yasumura	Akatsuki Yamatoya	Kazuhisa Kosuge	August 27, 2003	August 12, 2006
Neji reveals that he had been toying with Hinata, and he disables her ability to use chakra with the Gentle Fist style. Hinata, inspired by Naruto, refuses to give up. She tells Neji that she believes that he is suffering more from fighting his destiny. Angered, Neji attempts a fatal blow, but four observing Jonin halt him. Hinata collapses into cardiac arrest shortly after, and Naruto vows to defeat Neji.
48	13	"Gaara vs. Rock Lee: The Power of Youth Explodes!"; Transliteration: "Gaara Funsai!! Wakasa da! Pawā da! Bakuhatsu da!" (Japanese: 我愛羅粉砕!! 若さだ！パワーだ！爆発だ！)	Toshiyuki Tsuru	Satoru Nishizono	Hirofumi Suzuki	September 3, 2003	August 19, 2006
The next set of matchups is Rock Lee against Gaara. At first, Lee's Strong Fist taijutsu is ineffective against Gaara's wall of sand that automatically rises to protect him. Lee then removes the heavy leg weights he was wearing, drastically increasing his speed and allowing him to bypass Gaara's defense. Lee then uses his Primary Lotus, but only succeeds in destroying a clone made of sand.
49	14	"Lee's Hidden Strength: Forbidden Secret Jutsu!"; Transliteration: "Nekketsu Ochikobore! Tsuini Sakuretsu, Kindan no Ōgi!" (Japanese: 熱血落ちこぼれ！遂に炸裂、禁断の奥義！)	Directed by : Hayato Date; Storyboarded by : Noriyuki Nakamura	Satoru Nishizono	Yasuhiko Kanezuka	September 10, 2003	August 26, 2006
Gaara reappears and attacks Lee, who is weakened from using his Primary Lotus again. Lee recovers by opening the Second Gate, shocking the Jonin observers in the audience. He proceeds to open the Third Gate and Fourth Gate.
50	15	"The Fifth Gate: A Splendid Ninja Is Born"; Transliteration: "Aa Rokku Rī! Kore ga Otoko no Ikizamayo!!" (Japanese: 嗚呼ロック・リー！これが男の生き様よ!!)	Mitsutaka Noshitani	Satoru Nishizono	Akihiro Tsuda	September 17, 2003	September 2, 2006
Lee's increased speed overwhelms Gaara's sand defenses. Lee opens the Fifth Gate and uses his most powerful attack, Hidden Lotus. Lee's power, accuracy, strength and speed increase outstandingly, allowing Lee to inflict extreme injuries on Garra with a 5th gate barrage of his. Unfortunately for Lee, Gaara survives by softening his fall with sand and uses his sand coffin to crush Lee's left arm and leg. Before Gaara can kill Lee, Guy intervenes. Lee, though unconscious due to his injuries, rises to continue the battle, his desire to win fueling his broken body. At the end of the match, Rock Lee is crippled to the extent that he cannot fight again. Guy regrets teaching Lee such dangerous techniques, but vacates the ring for the final match between Choji Akimichi and Dosu Kinuta.
51	16	"A Shadow in Darkness: Danger Approaches Sasuke"; Transliteration: "Yami ni Ugomeku Kage – Sasuke ni Semaru Kiki!" (Japanese: 闇にうごめく影 サスケに迫る危機！)	Yuki Hayashi	Kou Hei Mushi	Hiromi Okazaki	September 24, 2003	September 9, 2006
Despite having formulated a strategy beforehand, Choji loses the round to Dosu, concluding the preliminaries. The nine qualifying Genin are assigned opponents, and they are all allowed to leave for a month of training before the finals. Elsewhere, Kabuto prepares to kidnap Sasuke under Orochimaru's orders, but he is stopped by Kakashi and is forced to retreat. Naruto later meets with Kakashi in hopes of training with him, but is given Ebisu as a replacement.
52	17	"Ebisu Returns: Naruto's Toughest Training Yet!"; Transliteration: "Ebisu Futatabi! Harenchi wa Watashi ga Yurushimasenzo!" (Japanese: エビス再び！ハレンチは私が許しませんぞ！)	Rion Kujo	Akatsuki Yamatoya	Yukimaro Ōtsubo	October 1, 2003	September 16, 2006
Naruto reluctantly agrees to train under Ebisu, and Ebisu tries to teach Naruto how to walk on water. As Naruto practices, Ebisu catches an old man (later revealed to be Jiraiya) spying on a women's bathhouse. As Ebisu rushes to apprehend him, Jiraiya knocks him out with a single hit, leaving Naruto without a tutor.
53	18	"Long Time No See: Jiraiya Returns!"; Transliteration: "Aiyashibaraku! Ero-sennin Tōjō!!" (Japanese: あいやしばらく！エロ仙人登場!!)	Directed by : Shūji Miyahara; Storyboarded by : Hayauma Ippaku	Michiko Yokote	Akira Matsushima	October 8, 2003	September 30, 2006
After Jiraiya knocks out Ebisu, Naruto is left without a tutor. Naruto asks Jiraiya to tutor him by using his Sexy Jutsu. While Jiraiya oversees Naruto's training, he quickly realizes that Naruto is the host of the Nine-Tails. Jiraiya unlocks the Five-Pronged Seal that Orochimaru had placed on Naruto in the Death Forest, and Naruto quickly grasps the concept of walking on water. Afterwards, Jiraiya speaks with Naruto about his two kinds of chakra: Blue Chakra and Red Chakra.
54	19	"The Summoning Jutsu: Wisdom of the Pervy Sage!"; Transliteration: "Ero-sennin Jikiden – Kuchiyose no Jutsu Dattebayo!!" (Japanese: エロ仙人直伝 口寄せの術だってばよ!!)	Directed by : Keiichiro Kawaguchi; Storyboarded by : Hayauma Ippaku	Katsuyuki Sumisawa	Jong Ki Choi	October 15, 2003	October 7, 2006
That night, having learned that he and his group were nothing more than tools for Orochimaru to test Sasuke, Dosu fails to ambush Gaara, who kills him. After talking to Kabuto about the upcoming invasion of Konohagakure by Sunagakure and Otogakure, Gaara's teacher Baki, kills Hayate for eavesdropping on them. The next day, Naruto resumes his training with Jiraiya. He signs a scroll that will allow him to use toads. At first, Naruto summons a tadpole.
55	20	"A Feeling of Yearning, a Flower Full of Hope"; Transliteration: "Setsunai Omoi – Negai o Kometa Ichirin" (Japanese: 切ない思い 願いを込めた一輪)	Directed by : Hiroshi Kimura; Storyboarded by : Ryō Yasumura	Satoru Nishizono	Kazuhisa Kosuge	October 22, 2003	October 21, 2006
Sakura and Ino goes to the hospital, only to find Sasuke gone. While there, Sakura checks on Lee. Despite the injuries that have taken away his hopes of becoming a ninja, Lee trains to regain his strength. The training causes him too much pain and he passes out. Elsewhere, the many finalists continue their training and Naruto summons a tadpole with hind-legs. Meanwhile, Sasuke accompanies Kakashi.
56	21	"Live or Die: Risk It All to Win It All!"; Transliteration: "Seika Shika!? Menkyokaiden wa Inochigake!" (Japanese: 生か死か!? 免許皆伝は命懸け！)	Directed by : Masaaki Kumagai; Storyboarded by : Toshiya Niidome	Akatsuki Yamatoya	Chikara Sakurai	October 29, 2003	October 28, 2006
Jiraiya realizes that Naruto's training is taking too long, and decides to use drastic measures. Knowing that Naruto can only tap into the Nine-Tails's chakra during life-or-death situations, Jiraiya sends Naruto to a local chasm off the cliff. While falling, Naruto enters his subconsciousness and meets the Nine-Tails for the first time. Though the Nine-Tails is hostile towards Naruto, he gives the boy a bit of his chakra out of self-interest. With the Nine-Tails's chakra, Naruto summons a giant toad to stop his descent.
57	22	"He Flies! He Jumps! He Lurks! Chief Toad Appears!"; Transliteration: "Tonda! Haneta! Mogutta! Gama Oyabun Tōjō!!" (Japanese: 飛んだ！跳ねた！潜った！ガマ親分登場!!)	Directed by : Hayato Date; Storyboarded by : Noriyuki Nakamura	Satoru Nishizono	Yasuhiko Kanezuka	November 5, 2003	November 4, 2006
The giant toad, revealed to be named Gamabunta, is angry that he has been summoned in a pit and even angrier that Naruto is sitting on top of his head. Although Naruto informs Gamabunta that he summoned him, Gamabunta does not believe him. Determined to prove himself, Naruto rides atop Gamabunta's head until sunset, while Gamabunta tries to shake him off. Naruto passes out and falls shortly before sunset, but he earns Gamabunta's respect in the process. Gamabunta escorts Naruto to the hospital.
58	23	"Hospital Besieged: The Evil Hand Revealed!"; Transliteration: "Shinobi Yoru Ma no Te! Nerawa-reta Byōshitsu" (Japanese: しのび寄る魔の手！狙われた病室)	Rion Kujo	Kou Hei Mushi	Yukimaro Ōtsubo	November 12, 2003	November 11, 2006
When Naruto awakens, he finds Shikamaru Nara sitting by his bed, bringing him a basket of fruit. The two locate Gaara elsewhere in the hospital and stops him from killing Lee. Gaara explains that his reason for existing is to kill everyone, and reveals that he, like Naruto, was alone for much of his childhood, hated and feared by others for being a host of a Tailed Beast. Might Guy appears, and defends Naruto, Shikamaru, and Lee, forcing Gaara to leave the hospital.
59	24	"The Final Rounds: Rush to the Battle Arena!"; Transliteration: "Mō Retsu Mō Tsui Mō Dasshu – Hansen Kaishi Dattebayo" (Japanese: モー烈モー追モーダッシュ 本選開始だってばよ)	Mitsutaka Noshitani	Yuka Miyata	Hideyuki Yoshida	November 19, 2003	November 18, 2006
On the day of the finals, Naruto makes his way to the arena. Along the way, he encounters and converses with Hinata. Hinata thanks Naruto for his words of encouragement during her match with Neji made her a better person. Hinata reassures him of his talents, removing any doubts he had about the finals. Naruto thanks Hinata and goes on his way. As he gets closer to the arena, Naruto meets Konohamaru Sarutobi, who tries to use a number of shortcuts to help Naruto get to the arena faster. The shortcuts end up being ineffective and time consuming, as a result, Naruto makes it to the stadium late but can still enter.
60	25	"Byakugan vs. Shadow Clone Technique!"; Transliteration: "Byakugan tai Kage Bunshin! Ore wa Zettē Katsu!!" (Japanese: 白眼VS(たい)影分身！オレはぜってー勝つ!!)	Directed by : Yuki Hayashi; Storyboarded by : Shinji Satō	Michiko Yokote	Marie Tagashira & Chiyuki Tanaka	November 26, 2003	November 18, 2006
Naruto begins his match with Neji Hyuga, whom he promised to defeat a month earlier during the preliminaries. Since taijutsu proves ineffective, Naruto creates a large number of shadow clones. Though Neji defeats them all, Naruto makes more.
61	26	"Ultimate Defense: Zero Blind Spot!"; Transliteration: "Shikaku Zero! Mō Hitotsu no Zettai Bōgyo" (Japanese: 死角ゼロ！もうひとつの絶対防御)	Directed by : Shūji Miyahara; Storyboarded by : Hayauma Ippaku	Akatsuki Yamatoya	Akira Matsushima	December 3, 2003	November 18, 2006
Naruto creates more shadow clones, and this time manages to sneak up on Neji. Before he can land a blow, Neji uses a powerful defensive technique, then follows up with blocking Naruto's chakra path. Even though he can no longer fight, Naruto does not give up, and berates Neji over how he treated Hinata. Neji then reveals the real history of the Hyuga clan and how the death of his father Hizashi Hyuga was arranged to protect the Hyuga Clan's head: Hinata's father Hiashi. He reaffirms his belief in the unchanging nature of one's destiny.
62	27	"A Failure's True Power"; Transliteration: "Ochikobore no Sokojikara!" (Japanese: 落ちこぼれの底力！)	Toshiya Niidome	Akatsuki Yamatoya	Hiromi Okazaki	December 10, 2003	November 18, 2006
Determined to prove Neji wrong, Naruto draws on the Nine-Tails's chakra, surprising many of the older ninja present with his ability to use the fox's chakra. Following an explosive clash between the two, Naruto manages to defeat Neji through the use of a shadow clone as a decoy. After telling Neji to stop putting so much faith in fate, Naruto wins the match.
63	28	"Hit It or Quit It: The Final Rounds Get Complicated!"; Transliteration: "Shikkaku!? Kiken! Maedaoshi! Haranbukumi no Daihonsen!" (Japanese: 失格!? キケン！前倒し！波乱含みの大本選！)	Directed by : Hiroshi Kimura; Storyboarded by : Ryō Yasumura	Satoru Nishizono	Kazuhisa Kosuge	December 17, 2003	November 25, 2006
While Neji recovers, Hiashi visits him and reveals the truth behind Hizashi's death. After Hiashi killed a kidnapper and saved Hinata, it became a threat to an established treaty between the Hidden Leaf and Hidden Storm ninja unless Hiashi is killed and sent to the Land of Lightning in good will. But the Hyuga clan plan to have Hizashi, Hiashi's younger twin brother, die in his place to keep the Byakugan of a main house Hyuga from falling into enemy hands. Despite Hiashi disapproving of his brother being sacrificed, Hizashi agrees to die on his own freewill to protect his brother. Though Neji does not believe this at first, he realizes it to be the truth upon seeing a final letter written by his father after his uncle apologizes. Meanwhile, the match between Sasuke Uchiha and Gaara is postponed due to Sasuke's absence, and the match between Shino Aburame and Kankuro is set to start. But Kankuro forfeits and a match between Shikamaru Nara and Temari begins instead.
64	29	"Zero Motivation: The Guy with Cloud Envy!"; Transliteration: "Kumo wa ī nā... Yaru ki Zero no Otoko" (Japanese: 雲はいいなあ... やる気ゼロの男)	Directed by : Rion Kujo; Storyboarded by : Toshiya Niidome	Michiko Yokote	Yukimaro Ōtsubo	December 24, 2003	December 2, 2006
Though initially unwilling, Shikamaru fights Temari because he refuses to lose to a girl. Shikamaru quickly studies the arena and its elements and comes up with a plan. Despite this, Temari has seen Shikamaru's primary attack, The Shadow Possession Jutsu in action and knows how it works. Shikamaru relies on strategy to defeat his opponent, but it becomes evident that Temari is a keen strategist too. However, Shikamaru's strategies are superior and enable him to capture Temari with his jutsu, but he forfeits as he has no chakra left to fight.
65	30	"Dancing Leaf, Squirming Sand"; Transliteration: "Gekitotsu! Konoha Mai – Suna Ugomeku Toki" (Japanese: 激突！木の葉舞い 砂うごめく瞬間(とき))	Directed by : Yoshihisa Matsumoto; Storyboarded by : Shinji Satō	Kou Hei Mushi	Jong Ki Choi	December 31, 2003	December 9, 2006
With Sasuke and Gaara's match needing to start, the Third Hokage Hiruzen Sarutobi sets a time limit for Sasuke to arrive of 10 minutes. Sasuke arrives at the last minute with Kakashi Hatake. Meanwhile, Gaara descends to the arena and kills a pair of ninjas for interfering.
66	31	"Bushy Brow's Jutsu: Sasuke Style!"; Transliteration: "Arashi o Yobu Otoko!! Sasuke no Gejimayu-ryū Taijutsu!" (Japanese: 嵐を呼ぶ男!! サスケのゲジマユ流体術！)	Directed by : Hayato Date; Storyboarded by : Hitoyuki Matsui	Akatsuki Yamatoya	Yasuhiko Kanezuka	January 14, 2004	December 16, 2006
Sasuke's enhanced speed and taijutsu skills enable him to bypass Gaara's sand-based defenses with ease, as Lee did previously. Determined to kill Sasuke, Gaara makes a defensive sphere of sand.
67	32	"Late for the Show, but Ready to Go! The Ultimate Secret Technique Is Born!"; Transliteration: "Date ni Oku-reta Wake Janai! Kyūkyoku Ōgi: Chidori Tanjō!!" (Japanese: だてに遅れたわけじゃない！究極奥義・千鳥誕生!!)	Directed by : Mitsutaka Noshitani; Storyboarded by : Shinji Satō	Akatsuki Yamatoya	Hideyuki Yoshida	January 14, 2004	December 23, 2006
To break through Gaara's defense, Sasuke uses his new and powerful jutsu that Kakashi learned in his training, Chidori: One Thousand Birds, to pierce Gaara's shield. This causes Gaara to stop his transformation as he panics upon seeing that he is bleeding. At that moment, Kabuto uses a genjutsu to put the audience to sleep, signaling the start of the invasion of Konoha.
Destruction of Leaf
68	33	"Zero Hour! The Destruction of Leaf Begins!"; Transliteration: ""Konoha Kuzushi" Shidō!" (Japanese: ｢木ノ葉崩し｣始動！)	Directed by : Masaaki Kumagai; Storyboarded by : Hitoyuki Matsui	Satoru Nishizono	Chikara Sakurai	January 28, 2004	January 6, 2007
Revealing himself to have killed the Fourth Kazekage before him, Orochimaru takes Hiruzen hostage as he has his personal bodyguards, the Sound Four, establish a barrier so no one can interfere. Meanwhile, invading Sound and Sand ninja infiltrate Konoha, and the battle begins to damage the village. Kankuro and Temari carry Gaara from the village, followed by Sasuke. Preoccupied with fending off the enemies and repelling the sleep-inducing genjutsu, Kakashi tells Sakura to wake Naruto and Shikamaru.
69	34	"Village in Distress: A New A-Ranked Mission!"; Transliteration: "Matte Mashita! Ē-Ranku Ninmu Dattebayo!!" (Japanese: 待ってました！A(エー)ランク任務だってばよ!!)	Directed by : Shūji Miyahara; Storyboarded by : Toshiya Niidome	Kou Hei Mushi	Akira Matsushima	February 4, 2004	January 13, 2007
Once Naruto and Shikamaru awaken (the latter actually faked sleep), Kakashi summons Pakkun to assist them in tracking down Sasuke. Meanwhile, Orochimaru begins his battle with Hiruzen, his former mentor before becoming the Third Hokage. Both display powerful techniques in what the observing ANBU describe as a Kage-level battle. During the battle, Orochimaru uses the Reanimation Jutsu to summon Hiruzen's deceased predecessors: the Second Hokage Tobirama Senju who invented the Reanimation Jutsu and the First Hokage Hashirama Senju, excluding the Fourth Hokage. The Senju brothers apologize to their former student for what is about to happen as Orochimaru forces them to fight Hiruzen.
70	35	"A Shirker's Call to Action: A Layabout No More!"; Transliteration: "Nigegoshi Nanbā Wan – Mendokusē ga Yarukkyanē!!" (Japanese: 逃げ腰NO．1(ナンバー・ワン) めんどくせーがやるっきゃねえ!!)	Rion Kujo	Michiko Yokote	Yukimaro Ōtsubo	February 11, 2004	January 20, 2007
As Naruto, Sakura, Shikamaru, and Pakkun pursue Sasuke, it soon becomes apparent that they are being followed by a group of nine Sound ninja. Shikamaru volunteers to stall them to buy the others time and falls back. Once the Sound ninja get close enough, Shikamaru traps them with his shadow, though he finds that he has only captured eight. Attempting to kill the eight, Shikamaru discovers the ninth's location, but lacks the chakra to trap him. Before the enemy ninjas can kill Shikamaru, Asuma Sarutobi arrives and defeats all nine of them.
71	36	"An Unrivaled Match: Hokage Battle Royale!"; Transliteration: "Kokon Musō! "Hokage" Toiu Reberu no Tatakai" (Japanese: 古今無双！｢火影｣というレベルの戦い)	Atsushi Wakabayashi	Akatsuki Yamatoya	Atsushi Wakabayashi	February 18, 2004	January 27, 2007
The Hokage battle begins, with Hashirama's Wood Style giving him and his brother the advantage on Hiruzen as he summons Enma the giant monkey king to help him in the uneven fight as Orochimaru brings out his Kusanagi sword. During the fight, Hiruzen learns that ninja brought back by the Reanimation Jutsu are immune to any normal form of attack and regenerate from any injury dealt on them. Explaining his desire to become immortal to know every form of ninjutsu, Orochimaru decides to reveal the fruits of his labor by peeling away his face: revealing the face of a girl whose body he now occupies.
72	37	"A Mistake from the Past: A Face Revealed!"; Transliteration: "Hokage no Ayamachi – Kamen no Shita no Sugao" (Japanese: 火影の過ち 仮面の下の素顔)	Directed by : Hiroshi Kimura; Storyboarded by : Ryō Yasumura	Kou Hei Mushi	Kazuhisa Kosuge	February 25, 2004	January 27, 2007
Though Temari tries to hold off Sasuke so the brothers can escape, Sasuke easily dispatches her and resumes his chase. At the Hokage battle, Orochimaru reveals the nature of his Transference Ritual that allows him to transfer his being into the body of another every few years and that he intends to make Sasuke his new vessel. Regretting not killing Orochimaru when he had the chance the night his former student left the village, Hiruzen musters up his chakra and summons shadow clones for a last resort attack to rectify the mistake.
73	38	"Forbidden Secret Technique: Reaper Death Seal!"; Transliteration: "Kinjutsu Ōgi! "Shiki Fūjin"" (Japanese: 禁術奥義！｢屍鬼封尽｣)	Yuki Hayashi	Michiko Yokote & Yuka Miyata	Yasuhiko Kanezuka	March 3, 2004	February 3, 2007
As the battles across Konoha rage on, Hiruzen has his clones use the Reaper Death Seal on the Senju brothers. As the corpses used to reanimate the first two Hokage are revealed to be Kin and Zaku, Hiruzen reveals that the Reaper Death Seal is a double-edge attack that the Fourth Hokage used to seal the Nine-Tails with his own soul as the price. Having given up two thirds of his own soul to seal the Senju brothers within the Reaper's stomach, Hiruzen intends to feed what remains of his own soul and Orochimaru's soul to the monster as well. However, Orochimaru has the Kusanagi stab Hiruzen in the back. Sasuke catches up with the Sand Siblings again. Before Gaara escapes with Temari, Shino Aburame arrives to fight Kankuro.
74	39	"Astonishing Truth! Gaara's Identity Emerges!"; Transliteration: "Kyōgaku! Gaara no Shōtai" (Japanese: 驚愕！我愛羅の正体)	Toshiya Niidome	Satoru Nishizono	Masaru Hyodo	March 10, 2004	February 10, 2007
Leaving Shino to deal with Kankuro, Sasuke continues following Gaara. Kankuro attacks Shino with his puppet, using its many hidden weapons to catch Shino by surprise. Shino dodges the attacks through the use of his destruction bugs, but eventually makes the mistake of inhaling some of the puppet's poison gas. As the battle goes on, Shino directs his bugs to Kankuro's location. They consume his chakra once they get there, causing Kankuro to collapse. The battle won, Shino also collapses due to Kankuro's poison. Sasuke catches up with Gaara as Shino's battle ends, and the two resume their match.
75	40	"Sasuke's Decision: Pushed to the Edge!"; Transliteration: "Genkai o Koete... Sasuke no Ketsudan!!" (Japanese: 限界を越えて... サスケの決断!!)	Directed by : Mitsutaka Noshitani; Storyboarded by : Toshiya Niidome	Akatsuki Yamatoya	Hideyuki Yoshida	March 17, 2004	February 17, 2007
Gaara begins transforming into Shukaku, dramatically increasing his strength and speed. Sasuke uses his Chidori to slice Gaara's arm off, but the pain only makes Gaara more determined and excited to kill Sasuke. Unable to use the Chidori a third time, Sasuke is forced to use his Cursed Seal so that he can attack Gaara again. This fails to defeat him, and Sasuke collapses due to the use of the Cursed Seal. As Gaara prepares to inflict the finishing blow, Naruto repels the attack with a kick. Naruto, Sakura, and Pakkun arrive and find Sasuke.
76	41	"Assassin of the Moonlit Night"; Transliteration: "Tsukiyo no Ansatsusha" (Japanese: 月夜の暗殺者)	Directed by : Rion Kujo; Storyboarded by : Tetsurō Amino	Akatsuki Yamatoya	Yukimaro Ōtsubo	March 24, 2004	February 24, 2007
Gaara tries to attack Sasuke again but is covered by Sakura who gets in the way. Gaara pushes Sakura out of the way while Naruto grabs Sasuke and saves him. Gaara sufrises a pain to remember his childhood with his maternal uncle Yashamaru. While Yashamaru had for many years been the only person who seemed to care for him, Gaara was shocked to find Yashamaru suddenly attacking him out of sheer hatred.
77	42	"Light vs. Dark: The Two Faces of Gaara"; Transliteration: "Hikari to Yami – Gaara Toiu na" (Japanese: 光と闇 我愛羅という名)	Directed by : Shūji Miyahara; Storyboarded by : Toshiya Niidome	Kou Hei Mushi	Akira Matsushima	March 31, 2004	March 3, 2007
As Gaara sufrises to reminisce about Yashamaru, he remembers Yashamaru's statement of his mother's death and his uncle's suicide bombing. Though Gaara survived the blast – thanks to the sand shield – he lost the only person who ever cared for him. From that point on, Gaara came to love only himself and started to find purpose in killing others. Returning to the present, Gaara keeps his grip on Sakura with his sand claw choking her to death. Gaara, feeling deranged, asks Naruto to play a game with him saying that if he can beat him, Sakura will be set free. Determined to save Sakura, an enraged Naruto violently attacks Gaara and they engage in battle.
78	43	"Naruto's Ninja Handbook"; Transliteration: "Bakuhatsu! Korezo Naruto Ninpōchō~~!!" (Japanese: 爆発！これぞナルト忍法帖～～っ!!)	Masaaki Kumagai	Satoru Nishizono	Hiromi Okazaki	April 7, 2004	March 10, 2007
With the lives of his comrades at stake, a determined Naruto manages to get rid of his fear of Gaara. Rejuvenated, Naruto uses techniques from his Ninja Handbook scroll. Naruto unleashes new and improved Naruto Uzumaki Barrage consisting of 2,000 shadow clones (Naruto Uzumaki 2k Barrage). Eight shadow clones kick Gaara into the air and all 2,000 shadow clones punch Gaara on every inch of his body before two shadow clones deliver the final blow to the barrage. Naruto attempts a second attack twice as powerful, with kicks. To fend off the attack, Gaara explodes his complete transformation into a replica of Shukaku, the One-Tailed Tanuki. Gaara tries to crush Naruto with his sand. Thinking of Sakura, Sasuke and his friends, Naruto uses his own chakra to summon Gamabunta. Gaara forces himself to sleep and allows Shukaku to take over. Needing to get close to Shukaku to wake Gaara up, Naruto and Gamabunta transform into a replica of the Nine-Tails to fight.
79	44	"Beyond the Limit of Darkness and Light"; Transliteration: "Rimitto Bucchigiri! "Hikari to Yami"" (Japanese: リミットぶっちぎり！～光と闇～)	Directed by : Hiroshi Kimura; Storyboarded by : Ryō Yasumura	Satoru Nishizono	Kazuya Saitō	April 14, 2004	March 17, 2007
As the transformed Gamabunta holds Shukaku in place, Naruto awakens Gaara. Tapping into the Nine-Tails's chakra again, Naruto headbutts Gaara and destroys Shukaku's form. Across Konoha, the village's ninja, including the parents of many of the Genin, begin the counterattack of the invading forces. At the site of his battle with Orochimaru, Hiruzen realizes that he does not have enough strength left to fully seal Orochimaru's soul, and instead opts to seal the part of his former pupil's soul within his arms. Robbing Orochimaru his ability to use ninjutsu, Hiruzen happily dies after bidding farewell to him.
80	45	"The Third Hokage, Forever..."; Transliteration: "Sandaime yo, Towa ni......!!" (Japanese: 三代目よ、永久に......!!)	Directed by : Akira Shimizu; Storyboarded by : Junya Koshiba	Akatsuki Yamatoya	Chikara Sakurai	April 21, 2004	March 24, 2007
Critically damaged, Orochimaru calls off the invasion and flees the village with his forces despite his sealed arms. In the forest, Naruto and Gaara both lay on the ground, devoid of chakra. Naruto sympathizes with Gaara for his childhood, but threatens to kill Gaara if he should ever bring harm to his friends again. Realizing that Naruto's strength came from the desire to protect others, Gaara begins to reshape his view of the world as his siblings take him home, and apologizes to Temari and Kankuro. The next day, Naruto and the ninja of Konoha mourn the deaths of those who died during the invasion, including Hiruzen. Kakashi does not attend the funeral and reminisces about Obito, as Jiraiya watches on and remembers his time in Hiruzen's genin squad.
Search for Tsunade
81	46	"Return of the Morning Mist"; Transliteration: "Asagiri no Kikyō" (Japanese: 朝霧の帰郷)	Yuki Hayashi	Kou Hei Mushi	Yasuhiko Kanezuka	April 28, 2004	March 31, 2007
Jiraiya reveals to be the pupil alongside Orochimaru. When the village's elders offer the position of the Fifth Hokage for Jiraiya, he declines it, saying that his former teammate Tsunade will be a candidate. Jiraiya offers to find her for Konoha and asks that he be allowed to take Naruto with him. Meanwhile, Itachi Uchiha and Kisame Hoshigaki enter Konoha, and are confronted by Asuma Sarutobi and Kurenai Yuhi. Itachi and Kisame quickly gain the advantage in battle, but Kakashi Hatake comes to their rescue at the last moment.
82	47	"Eye to Eye: Sharingan vs. Sharingan!"; Transliteration: "Sharingan tai Sharingan!!" (Japanese: 写輪眼VS(たい)写輪眼!!)	Directed by : Rion Kujo; Storyboarded by : Toshiya Niidome	Yuka Miyata	Yukimaro Ōtsubo	May 5, 2004	April 7, 2007
Kakashi and Itachi exchange blows, each being very proficient with the Sharingan. Itachi neutralizes Kakashi with his genjutsu Tsukuyomi. As Kakashi struggles to remain standing, he asks Itachi why he returned to Konoha. Itachi replies that they are after Naruto, which Kakashi elaborates as meaning they want the Nine-Tails for their organization Akatsuki. Annoyed that Kakashi knows of their organization, Itachi instructs Kisame to kill Asuma and Kurenai, before bringing Kakashi to him so they can find out what else he knows of their group. Before Kisame can do so, Might Guy arrives. Itachi and Kisame leave the battle.
83	48	"Jiraiya: Naruto's Potential Disaster!"; Transliteration: "Ō, Nō~! Jiraiya no Jonan, Naruto no Sainan" (Japanese: おお、のォ～っ！自来也の女難、ナルトの災難)	Directed by : Mamoru Enomoto; Storyboarded by : Tetsurō Amino	Michiko Yokote	Hideyuki Yoshida	May 12, 2004	April 14, 2007
Guy, Asuma, and Kurenai take an unconscious Kakashi home to rest, where they decide Sasuke Uchiha should not know of Itachi's return. Despite their wishes, Sasuke finds out, and learns that his older brother Itachi is after Naruto Uzumaki. Determined to kill Itachi and avenge the Uchiha clan, Sasuke rushes out to find Naruto, though he discovers that Naruto has already left the village with Jiraiya. In another town, Naruto sits in a hotel room while Jiraiya tries to pick up a woman. After someone knocks on a door, Naruto opens it to reveal Itachi and Kisame standing before him.

== Home media release ==
=== English ===
==== DVD ====
Naruto Uncut (USA)
Volume	Date	Discs	Episodes	Reference
3	May 29, 2007	3	26–38	
4	August 7, 2007	3	39–52	
5	December 4, 2007	3	53–65	
6	February 12, 2008	3	66–78	
7	May 6, 2008	3	79–92	

Naruto Season Box Set (USA)
Box Set	Date	Discs	Episodes	Reference
Season 1, Vol. 2	November 24, 2009	6	26–52	
Season 2, Vol. 1	February 16, 2010	6	53–78	
Season 2, Vol. 2	April 27, 2010	6	79–106	

Naruto Unleashed (UK)
Volume	Date	Box Set Release	Disc	Episodes	Reference
Series 2 Part 1	May 21, 2007	December 24, 2007	3	27–39	
Series 2 Part 2	September 3, 2007	December 24, 2007	3	40–52	
Series 3 Part 1	April 7, 2008	October 20, 2008	3	53–65	
Series 3 Part 2	May 26, 2008	October 20, 2008	3	66–78	
Series 4 Part 1	August 25, 2008	February 23, 2009	3	79–91	

Naruto Uncut (AUS / NZ)
Collection	Episodes	DVD release date	Reference
3	26–38	July 23, 2008	
4	39–53	August 20, 2008	
5	54–65	September 17, 2008	
6	66–78	October 22, 2008	
7	79–92	November 12, 2008	

Naruto Origins (AUS / NZ)
Collection	Episodes	DVD release date	Reference
1	1–52	May 24, 2017	
2	53–106	May 24, 2017	

==== Blu-ray ====
Viz Media (Region 1/A)
Set	Date	Discs	Episodes	References
2	February 16, 2021	4	28–55	
3	May 11, 2021	4	56–82	
4	August 24, 2021	4	83–110	
