= Naruto season 1 =

Naruto
- Season 1
- First Japanese home media volume cover of the season
- No. of episodes: 35

Release
- Original network: TV Tokyo
- Original release: October 3, 2002 – May 28, 2003

Season chronology
- Next → Season 2

The first season of the Naruto anime television series is directed by Hayato Date, and produced by Pierrot and TV Tokyo. Based on Masashi Kishimoto's manga series of the same name, it follows Naruto Uzumaki living in the Hidden Leaf Village, determined to become the next Hokage and gain the respect of the people. The season ran from October 3, 2002, to May 28, 2003, on TV Tokyo and its affiliates, consisting of 35 episodes. (Note: The number of episodes are based on how Sony / Aniplex divides the seasons (stages) of Naruto in its original Japanese home media release. The number of seasons and how many episodes each has varies depending on the series distributor. Some other ways the first season could be split based on streaming services and home video releases are as follows: Viz Media and Hulu season 1: Eps. 1–52 (52 episodes); Netflix and Crunchyroll season 1: Eps. 1–26 (26 episodes); Apple TV+ season 1: Eps. 1–57 (57 episodes))

The English dub ran from September 10, 2005, to May 27, 2006, on Cartoon Network's Toonami programming block in the United States and YTV's Bionix programming block in Canada. The season's episodes ran on Adult Swim's relaunched Toonami block in a completely uncut format from December 1, 2012, to November 30, 2013. After the 52nd episode, it was removed from the schedule rotation to make room for its successor series, Naruto: Shippuden. The series returned to Adult Swim on May 31, 2024, as part of its short-lived Toonami Rewind weekday afternoon block, which ran until it dissolved on December 27 of the same year. The episodes would later re-air on the traditional Toonami block beginning on January 12, 2025.

In Japan, the season released in both VHS and DVD format. A total of twelve volumes were released by Sony Pictures Entertainment between January 1 and December 3, 2003. Episodes from this season were later released on nine DVD compilations by Viz Media between March 28, 2006, and February 20, 2007, with two compilations of thirteen and twelve episodes released for the first season. The first of these compilations was nominated at the American Anime Awards for best package design. In 2009, Viz released another two DVD boxes containing episodes 1–25 and 26–52, respectively.

Four pieces of theme music are used for the episodes; two opening themes and two closing themes in the Japanese episodes and a single theme for the openings and endings in the English-dubbed version. The two Japanese opening themes are "Rocks" (stylized as R★O★C★K★S) by Hound Dog (used for episodes 1 to 26) and "Haruka Kanata" (遥か彼方; lit. Far Away) by Asian Kung-Fu Generation, used for episodes 27 to 35). The two closing themes are "Wind" by Akeboshi (used for episodes 1 to 26) and "Harmonia" by Rythem (used for episodes 27 to 35). The opening and ending theme for the English airing is "Rise" by Jeremy Sweet and Ian Nickus, with an instrumental version played as the closing theme.

== Episodes ==
No. overall	No. in season	Title	Directed by	Written by	Animation directed by	Original release date	English air date
Prologue
1	1	"Enter: Naruto Uzumaki!"; Transliteration: "Sanjō! Uzumaki Naruto" (Japanese: 参上！うずまきナルト)	Hayato Date	Katsuyuki Sumisawa	Yuji Moriyama	October 3, 2002	September 10, 2005
Naruto Uzumaki is a twelve-year-old troublemaker ninja living in the Hidden Leaf Village under harsh ridicule from the villagers, having defaced a monument dedicated to the four Hokage leaders out of a need for acknowledgement. His teacher, Iruka Umino, reprimands him for putting graffiti on each face statues, later hearing his aspirations of becoming Hokage to become respected by the villages. The next day, being held back from graduating the Ninja Academy after a botched Clone Jutsu, Naruto is tricked by an academy teacher named Mizuki into stealing a scroll containing the secret ninjutsu from the Third Hokage Hiruzen Sarutobi that night. Iruka intercepts Naruto, before being ambushed by Mizuki. He reveals to Naruto that the villagers were ordered not to reveal him a host to a demon fox called the Nine Tails which devastated their village twelve years ago. Mizuki explains this to be the reasoning Naruto has been isolated, adding that Iruka's parents were killed by the demon. The remorseful Iruka protects Naruto and tells him that they have a lot in common, spurring Naruto to use the Multi Shadow Clones Jutsu he learned from the scroll to subdue Mizuki. The next day, Iruka gives the headband to Naruto, in order to justify his graduation from school.
2	2	"My Name Is Konohamaru!"; Transliteration: "Konohamaru da Kore!" (Japanese: 木ノ葉丸だ コレ！)	Directed by : Rion Kujo; Storyboarded by : Hitoyuki Matsui	Akatsuki Yamatoya	Yukimaro Ōtsubo	October 10, 2002	September 10, 2005
While Naruto gets into an argument with Hiruzen over how he wanted to present himself on the photo of Ninja Registration Form, the Third Hokage is attacked by a small boy, who is revealed to be his grandson Konohamaru Sarutobi. While following Naruto, who is the first person to not see him solely as the Hokage's grandson, Konohamaru asks to be taught the Sexy Jutsu that Naruto used on Hiruzen. In the process, Konohamaru reveals his own reasons for wanting to become Hokage and his desire to be recognised for his own achievements. The two are eventually found by Konohamaru's mentor Ebisu, who sees Naruto as a bad influence on Konohamaru, with the resultant confrontation ending after Naruto uses Ebisu's lust against him, by combining his Sexy Jutsu and the Shadow Clone Jutsu to produce the overwhelming Sexy Harem Jutsu. Through Naruto's guidance, Konohamaru is able to accept that he cannot follow in his grandfather's footsteps by his name alone.
3	3	"Sasuke and Sakura: Friends or Foes?"; Transliteration: "Shukuteki!? Sasuke to Sakura" (Japanese: 宿敵!? サスケとサクラ)	Directed by : Yuki Hayashi; Storyboarded by : Hitoyuki Matsui	Satoru Nishizono	Yasuhiko Kanezuka	October 17, 2002	September 17, 2005
Once graduated from the Ninja Academy, having drunk some milk before meeting up with his former classmates. At classroom, all the girls were fighting over Sasuke. Upset over the attention Sasuke is getting from the girls, Naruto gets on top of the desk and fiercely glares at Sasuke and accidentally, he kissed Sasuke and is knock out by the girls. Later, Naruto is assigned to be a member of a three-person squad before undergoing a test to obtain the rank of Genin. He is put into Team 7, along with Sasuke Uchiha, his long-time rival, and Sakura Haruno, whom he has feelings for despite her own feelings for Sasuke. Knowing of Sakura's romantic feelings for Sasuke, Naruto formulated a scheme to dispose of his rival and pose as Sasuke to get close to Sakura. But at the last second, Naruto forcefully goes to the bathroom, while the real Sasuke somehow escapes and runs into Sakura while searching for Naruto. After expressing disgust toward Sakura when she blames Naruto's stupidity on not having parents, Sasuke finds Naruto after he was forced to ditch a guilt-driven Sakura to go to the bathroom again, with their confrontation short-lived. Meanwhile, Naruto's stomach pains are revealed to be the result of drinking long-expired milk earlier as Hiruzen briefs the Jonin instructor to mentor Naruto and his teammates.
4	4	"Pass or Fail: Survival Test"; Transliteration: "Shiren! Sabaibaru Enshū" (Japanese: 試練！サバイバル演習)	Directed by : Kyōsuke Mikuriya; Storyboarded by : Takaaki Ishiyama	Michiko Yokote	Takako Onishi, Yukiko Ban & Takeshi Ōsaka	October 24, 2002	September 24, 2005
As their classmates gradually all meet up with their Jonin instructors who will decide whether they are fit to become Genin, Team 7 are forced to wait for theirs. Eventually, after Naruto sets up a juvenile trap, he and his group meet their instructor: Kakashi Hatake. Appearing to be a slacker, Kakashi takes the day to let his students each introduce themselves and tell each other their desires and aims: Naruto states that his dream is to become Hokage, Sakura seems too embarrassed by hers to say them publicly, and Sasuke declares his intent to restore his clan by killing an unnamed person. With the introductions over, Kakashi tells Team 7 that their test will begin tomorrow and that they are not to eat before then. The next day, after forcing Team 7 to wait for him again, Kakashi explains that the test entails the seizure of one of two bells from his person, the catch being that only two of the prospective Genin will pass while third is sent back to the Academy. While Sasuke and Sakura hide themselves away as the test begins, Naruto attempts to face Kakashi head-on with his Shadow Clones Technique, which is easily countered, and then falls for a snare trap. Taking advantage of Kakashi lecturing Naruto about falling for obvious traps, Sasuke seemingly takes out the instructor with shuriken and kunai knives.
5	5	"You Failed! Kakashi's Final Decision"; Transliteration: "Shikkaku? Kakashi no Ketsuron" (Japanese: 失格？カカシの結論)	Yasunori Urata	Michiko Yokote	Mariko Aoki	October 31, 2002	October 1, 2005
After his sneak attack failed, Sasuke attempts to fight Kakashi before being buried up to his neck underground. From there, Kakashi subjects Sakura to a genjutsu of Sasuke bleeding to death before dealing with Naruto when he decides to help himself to everyone's lunches. Once the time limit for the test is reached, Naruto is tied to a pole, and Kakashi deems all members of Team 7 utter failures as he reveals that his test was impossible for them, due to their lack of teamwork during the exercise. From there, Kakashi offers to give Team 7 one final chance and leaves them with a single order to follow: not to feed Naruto. However, knowing that they need Naruto at full strength for what Kakashi has in store for a make-up test, Sasuke and Sakura feed Naruto. Having watched the entire event, Kakashi dramatically appears before them. As Kakashi apparently prepares to punish them all, Sakura and Sasuke stand up to him, explaining that they gave Naruto food because he is a member of their team. Ultimately, finding a group who actually met his test's standards, Kakashi decides to pass Team 7 and accepts them as his students. From there, Kakashi reveals that the other teams he tested failed not because of their failures in the exercise, but because of their inability to see through the deception and work as a team. He explains the essential need for ninja groups to work as a unit, as well as stating his own ideal that, while ninja who break the rules are scum, those who abandon their friends are worse than scum.
Land of Waves Escort
6	6	"A Dangerous Mission! Journey to the Land of Waves!"; Transliteration: "Jūyō Ninmu! Nami no Kuni e Chō-shuppatsu" (Japanese: 重要任務！波の国へ超出発)	Masahiko Murata	Kou Hei Mushi	Yukiko Ban	November 7, 2002	October 8, 2005
After Team 7 completes a few miscellaneous D-ranked missions, Naruto relentlessly asks Hiruzen for a higher level C-rank mission, and they are eventually assigned to escort a bridge builder named Tazuna back to the Land of Waves. But they are ambushed along the way by the Demon Brothers, two Chunin from the Hidden Mist Village in the Land of Water. Though it appeared they killed him as they go after Team 7 and Tazuna, the Demon Brothers learned that Kakashi was aware of their presence and faked his death to catch them off-guard and see his students in action. While applauding Sasuke for holding off the Demon Brothers and Sakura for guarding Tazuna, Kakashi expresses disappointment in how poorly Naruto handled the situation and got himself poisoned. But Naruto refuses to quit the mission, and with Sasuke's taunting getting to him, uses a kunai to stab his hand to bleed out the poison while making a promise to never back down again. Though Kakashi decides to have Naruto's self-inflicted wound dealt with, he is amazed by the boy's rapid healing and wonders if it is the Nine-Tails's doing. Elsewhere, a man named Gato confronts the Demon Brothers' boss for his subordinates' failure to assassinate Tazuna. Threatening Gato with his large sword, the figure decides to handle the job personally.
7	7	"The Assassin of the Mist!"; Transliteration: "Kiri no Ansatsusha!" (Japanese: 霧の暗殺者！)	Directed by : Masayuki Iimura; Storyboarded by : Hitoyuki Matsui	Michiko Yokote	Naoki Aisaka	November 14, 2002	October 15, 2005
On the way to the Land of Waves, with Kakashi threatening to abandon the mission if not provided an adequate explanation for lying about the mission's difficulty level, Tazuna reveals his desire to build a bridge to save the impoverished Land of Waves from the wealthy shipping-magnate Gato. Hearing his story, Team 7 agree to go through with the mission regardless for humanitarian reasons. But once on the bridge, the group is ambushed by Zabuza Momochi, a Rogue Ninja from the Hidden Mist Village who works for Gato. Refusing to hand Tazuna over, Kakashi is forced to reveal a strange eye. The former confused as to how Kakashi obtained it, Sasuke and Zabuza both recognise the strange eye as a Sharingan. While Team 7 protects Tazuna, Kakashi engages Zabuza, both using clones to distract the other to get them from behind.
8	8	"The Oath of Pain"; Transliteration: "Itami ni Chikau Ketsui" (Japanese: 痛みに誓う決意)	Rion Kujo	Akatsuki Yamatoya	Yukimaro Ōtsubo	November 21, 2002	October 22, 2005
Kakashi is eventually caught off-guard and is captured in the Water Prison Technique. With Kakashi immobilised, Zabuza creates a water clone to go after the rest of Team 7 and Tazuna. Though Kakashi tells his students to run, Naruto remembers the promise he made to himself and decides to fight to save Kakashi and keep Tazuna alive. With Naruto using his transformation skills with Sasuke's expertise with a Fuma Shuriken, the two youths succeed in forcing Zabuza to release Kakashi in order to avoid Naruto's kunai.
9	9	"Kakashi: Sharingan Warrior!"; Transliteration: "Sharingan no Kakashi" (Japanese: 写輪眼のカカシ)	Directed by : Yuki Hayashi; Storyboarded by : Toshiya Niidome	Satoru Nishizono	Yasuhiko Kanezuka	November 28, 2002	October 29, 2005
Once freed from the Water Prison, Kakashi uses his Sharingan to replicate many of Zabuza's water-based attacks, causing him to become agitated and is easily defeated. At the last second, Zabuza is seemingly killed by a young masked Hunter Ninja from the Hidden Mist Village. Naruto is angry and jealous that someone so young could easily defeat an opponent that gave Team 7 so much trouble, but Kakashi says that there are many ninja younger than Naruto yet stronger than himself. The hunter-ninja leaves with Zabuza's body, and Kakashi then collapses from fatigue as a result of using his Sharingan for too long.
10	10	"The Forest of Chakra"; Transliteration: "Chakura no Mori" (Japanese: チャクラの森)	Directed by : Kazuyoshi Yokota; Storyboarded by : Hitoyuki Matsui	Katsuyuki Sumisawa	Atsushi Aono	December 5, 2002	November 5, 2005
Brought to Tazuna's home to recover from his fight with Zabuza, Naruto meets the bridge builder's grandson Inari, while Kakashi awakens realizing that there were numerous inconsistencies between the actions of the masked youth and that of other hunter-nin. Expecting to face Zabuza again, Kakashi decides to take Team 7 to the woods to teach them chakra control by having them walk up a tree by focusing chakra beneath their feet. While Sakura was successful on her first try, both Naruto and Sasuke had to attempt it numerous times. Elsewhere, revealed to be Zabuza's follower, the masked youth known as Haku tends to Zabuza's wounds as the swordsman intends to settle things with Kakashi once fully healed in a week's time.
11	11	"The Land Where a Hero Once Lived"; Transliteration: "Eiyū no Ita Kuni" (Japanese: 英雄のいた国)	Yasunori Urata	Akatsuki Yamatoya	Takako Onishi	December 12, 2002	November 12, 2005
While Naruto and Sasuke try to outdo each other in their Tree Climbing Practice, Sakura accompanies Tazuna and is astonished by the poverty and fear in the Land of Waves. Following dinner, Sakura asks about Inari staring at the torn family photo on the wall, but the boy runs off with his mother Tsunami chasing after him. Tazuna then explains that the man torn from the picture, named Kaiza, was once a hero in the Land of Waves. Kaiza raised Inari after saving his life from bullies that attempted to drown him and his dog. When Gato arrived in the village, Kaiza was kidnapped and tortured, including having his arms crushed with sledgehammers. Shortly after, Kaiza is publicly executed by Gato's men in front of Inari and the other people of the town, to serve as an example of anyone who opposes Gato. Moved by the story, Naruto resumes his training with the intent to prove to Inari that there are still heroes in the world.
12	12	"Battle on the Bridge! Zabuza Returns!"; Transliteration: "Kyōjō Kessen! Zabuza Futatabi!!" (Japanese: 橋上決戦！ザブザ再び!!)	Directed by : Masaaki Kumagai; Storyboarded by : Hitoyuki Matsui	Michiko Yokote	Yukiko Ban	December 19, 2002	November 19, 2005
After training in the woods, Naruto is awoken by someone whom he thought was a girl. Eventually learning that the person is actually a boy, but unaware that he is the masked youth Haku, Naruto gets into an exchange of ideals and morals before the two part ways. Once found by Sasuke, Naruto resumes his Tree Climbing Practice into the evening until he and Sasuke finally make it to the top of their respective trees. Naruto and Sasuke return triumphantly to Tazuna's home, with Naruto cheerful yet completely drained from the effort. Inari is disturbed by the sight of Naruto, thinking about Kaiza and gets into a heated dispute with Naruto, who angrily leaves while calling him a coward. Later that night, Kakashi tells a despondent Inari that Naruto understands the boy's pain from his own hardships. The next day, Kakashi, Sasuke, and Sakura escort Tazuna to the bridge without Naruto. There, they find Tazuna's workers unconscious with Zabuza and a masked Haku behind the incident.
13	13	"Haku's Secret Jutsu: Demonic Mirroring Ice Crystals"; Transliteration: "Haku no Hijutsu: Makyō Hyōshō" (Japanese: 白の秘術・魔鏡氷晶)	Directed by : Masayuki Iimura; Storyboarded by : Hiroki Kawashima	Satoru Nishizono	Naoki Aisaka	December 26, 2002	November 26, 2005
At Tazuna's house, two of Gato's thugs arrive to kidnap Tsunami. Inari musters his courage in an attempt to stop them, but is saved when Naruto defeats them. Before leaving to join the others at the bridge, Naruto apologises to Inari for calling him a coward and acknowledges his bravery. On the bridge, as Kakashi engages Zabuza, Sasuke's newly gained speed gives him an advantage against Haku before the masked ninja traps him in his personal Crystal Ice Mirrors Technique.
14	14	"The Number One Hyperactive, Knucklehead Ninja Joins the Fight!"; Transliteration: "Igaisei Nanbā Wan, Naruto Sansen!" (Japanese: 意外性No.1(ナンバー・ワン)、ナルト参戦！)	Directed by : Rion Kujo; Storyboarded by : Hitoyuki Matsui	Satoru Nishizono	Yukimaro Ōtsubo	January 9, 2003	December 3, 2005
Having arrived, with Kakashi preoccupied with Zabuza, Naruto attempts to help Sasuke by attacking the Crystal Ice Mirrors from the outside while Sasuke attacks from the inside. But Naruto's unfamiliarity with Haku's abilities traps him as he and Sasuke are forced to work together against Haku, who sees that he must make an exception to his no killing policy.
15	15	"Zero Visibility: The Sharingan Shatters"; Transliteration: "Shikai Zero no Tatakai: Sharingan Kuzushi" (Japanese: 視界ゼロの戦い・写輪眼崩し)	Directed by : Yuki Hayashi; Storyboarded by : Hitoyuki Matsui	Satoru Nishizono	Yasuhiko Kanezuka	January 16, 2003	December 10, 2005
Naruto and Sasuke both attempt to destroy the ice mirrors, their respective Shadow Clone and Fireball Techniques having no effect. Realizing that Haku's Crystal Ice Mirrors are actually an Ice-Style Kekkei Genkai, a genetic trait in certain ninja, Kakashi decides to use his Sharingan to quickly end his fight with Zabuza. But Haku told him about Kakashi's methods during their last fight, Zabuza has the advantage as he uses his Hidden Mist technique to counter Kakashi's Sharingan and force the ninja to anticipate his opponent's next move. While Kakashi rushes to Tazuna and Sakura under the assumption that Zabuza would attack them, he ends up leaving him himself open from behind as Zabuza lands a strike with his Kubikiribōchō sword.
16	16	"The Broken Seal"; Transliteration: "Kaihō Sareta Fūin" (Japanese: 解放された封印)	Directed by : Masaaki Kumagai; Storyboarded by : Hidehito Ueda	Katsuyuki Sumisawa	Takako Onishi & Yukimaro Ōtsubo	January 23, 2003	December 17, 2005
Naruto and Sasuke are both injured severely from Haku's Crystal Ice Mirrors before the latter reveals his Uchiha lineage by awakening his clan's own inherit ability: the Sharingan. With Sasuke's Sharingan allowing him to track Haku's incredibly fast movements, he is deemed a bigger threat than Naruto and a volley of shuriken is used to force Sasuke to take a hit meant for his teammate. Believing his teammate had died in his arms, Naruto is enraged and unconsciously taps into the Nine-Tails's chakra to heal his wounds while attacking Haku.
17	17	"White Past: Hidden Ambition"; Transliteration: "Shiroi Kako: Himeta Omoi" (Japanese: 白い過去・秘めた想い)	Toshiyuki Tsuru	Michiko Yokote	Hirofumi Suzuki & Masaru Hyodo	January 30, 2003	December 31, 2005
The Nine-Tails's chakra recedes after Naruto used to attack Haku while dispelling his mirrors, breaking his opponent's mask and revealing him as the youth he previously conversed with. Asking Naruto to kill him as he had failed Zabuza, a flashback reveals that he had inherited his ability from his mother as they lived in the Land of Water. But as those with Kekkei Genkai are demonized, Haku is forced to watch his mother killed by his father, before subconsciously invoking his powers to kill his father and the angry mob. Some time after, Haku was found by Zabuza and trained to hone his skills to be of use to the swordsman. Meanwhile, having sensed Naruto only released a fraction of the Nine-Tails's chakra, Kakashi summons a number of dogs to find and restrain Zabuza. At that time, Haku manages to convince Naruto to kill him before seeing Kakashi about to finish Zabuza off with his own Lightning Blade Technique.
18	18	"The Weapons Known as Shinobi"; Transliteration: "Shinobi Toiu na no Dōgu" (Japanese: 忍という名の道具)	Directed by : Yasunori Urata; Storyboarded by : Hiroki Kawashima	Akatsuki Yamatoya	Yuji Moriyama	February 6, 2003	January 7, 2006
Inari is shown running from door to door throughout the Land of Waves, trying to rally the villagers into defending Tazuna and the bridge. Though he agrees to kill Haku, Naruto instead witnesses Haku sacrificing himself to protect Zabuza from Kakashi's Lightning Blade. Unfazed by his apprentice's sacrifice, Zabuza continues attacking Kakashi while Tazuna accompanies Sakura to Sasuke's dead body. Kakashi manages to disable Zabuza's arms before their battle is interrupted by Gato and his men, the criminal intending to kill Zabuza and everyone else present. Meanwhile, disappointed in his attempts to rally the villagers support for the bridge, Inari sets out alone but finds a crowd waiting for him outside.
19	19	"The Demon in the Snow"; Transliteration: "Zabuza Yuki ni Chiru..." (Japanese: ザブザ雪に散る...)	Toshiyuki Tsuru	Akatsuki Yamatoya	Hirofumi Suzuki & Masaru Hyodo	February 13, 2003	January 14, 2006
Now fired by Gato, Zabuza no longer has a reason to kill Tazuna and fight Kakashi, but is unfazed when his former employer kicks Haku's corpse. Though Zabuza sees Haku as nothing more than a tool, he is moved by Naruto's words as he tearfully acknowledges Haku's sacrifice. With Kakashi telling Naruto not to interfere out of respect, Zabuza redeems himself as a ninja by enduring multiple stabs and beatings to reach Gato and killing him with the kunai he placed in his mouth. Zabuza collapses as Gato's men retreat when the villagers arrive, Team 7 are relieved to discover that Sasuke is still alive, having been spared any lethal injuries. Honouring Zabuza's dying wish to place him beside Haku, Kakashi assures his former enemy that he and Haku will go to the same place. Soon after, he and Team 7 give the two rogue ninjas a burial with Zabuza's Kubikiribōchō as a grave marker, and Naruto express his disdain for the notion that ninjas should strive to become merely tools and declares that he will find his own Ninja Way following Naruto's Way. As Team 7 leave for the Hidden Leaf, Tazuna proclaims to the village that the bridge will be called the Great Naruto Bridge to signify the strength that Naruto gave Inari, who in turn gave it to the whole town.
Chūnin Exams
20	20	"A New Chapter Begins: The Chūnin Exam!"; Transliteration: "Shinshō Totsunyū! Chūnin Shiken Dattebayo" (Japanese: 新章突入！中忍試験だってばよ)	Directed by : Mitsutaka Noshitani; Storyboarded by : Satoru Iriyoshi	Kou Hei Mushi	Akihiro Tsuda	February 20, 2003	January 21, 2006
After their adventure in the Land of Waves, Team 7 has returned to doing miscellaneous missions, with Naruto's rivalry with Sasuke making matters worse to the point that Kakashi decides to call it a day and sends his students home. After Sasuke takes his leave, Naruto and Sakura meet up with Konohamaru and his friends Udon and Moegi. As antics ensue with him making Sakura mad, Konohamaru accidentally bumps into two foreign ninja. Despite advice from his older sister Temari (one of the two mystery ninja), Kankuro (the other) threatens to kill Konohamaru. After somehow tripping Naruto, Kankuro was about to hit Konohamaru when Sasuke hits the ninja with a stone. Just as Kankuro is about to attack Sasuke, he is stopped by his younger brother Gaara as Temari explains that they are ninja from the Hidden Sand Village in the Land of Wind who have arrived for the Chunin Exams.
21	21	"Identify Yourself: Powerful New Rivals"; Transliteration: "Nanore! Arawareta Kyōteki Tachi!!" (Japanese: 名乗れ！現れた強敵たち!!)	Directed by : Matsuo Asami; Storyboarded by : Ryō Yasumura	Katsuyuki Sumisawa	Kazuhisa Kosuge	February 27, 2003	January 28, 2006
Encountering the Sand Siblings, Team 7 learns that the three are ninja who have come from the Hidden Sand Village to participate in the Chunin Exams to be promoted to Chunin-level ninja. Elsewhere, meeting with Hiruzen on the matter, Kakashi, the Third Hokage's son Asuma Sarutobi, and Kurenai Yuhi all nominate their students for the Chunin Exams to Iruka's disbelief. Iruka challenges their decision as he believes Naruto and the others are not ready for the exam, but Kakashi explains to Iruka that they are no longer his students. The next day, Kakashi gives Team 7 the application forms for the Chunin Exams with Sasuke and Naruto more than willing, while Sakura is uncertain. Later, each member of Team 7 is attacked by a mysterious ninja that they defeated in a one-on-one fight. The figure is revealed to be Iruka, who reports to Kakashi of approving his choice. Later, while making their way to site of the Chunin Exam, Team 7 meets Rock Lee and his teammates Neji Hyuga and Tenten. Though they leave to make their way to where the exams are, Team 7 is followed by Lee who intends to issue a challenge to Sasuke.
22	22	"Chūnin Challenge: Rock Lee vs. Sasuke!"; Transliteration: "Kiai Hyaku-Nijū Pāsento Nau de Rokku na Chōsenjō!" (Japanese: 気合120%(ひゃくにじゅうパーセント) ナウでロックな挑戦状！)	Directed by : Rion Kujo; Storyboarded by : Hitoyuki Matsui	Akatsuki Yamatoya	Yukimaro Ōtsubo	March 6, 2003	February 4, 2006
Following Team 7, and revealed to have a crush on Sakura, Lee challenges Sasuke to a battle. Feeling neglected in his teammates's shadows, Naruto's attempt to fight Lee himself only ended with him being quickly knocked out. Now interested to face an opponent calling himself the strongest Genin, Sasuke accepts his challenge but finds himself powerless against an opponent who uses taijutsu. Lee was about to finish the fight with his Dancing Leaf Shadow attack when a large turtle named Ningame appears. Soon after, as Naruto thinks Ningame is his mentor, Lee's actual mentor Might Guy appears on top of Ningame with Team 7 a bit taken back by Guy's tough love and motivational speech for Lee. Upon noticing them, Guy reveals himself to be an eternal rival of Kakashi's before taking his leave after giving Lee a punishment task to complete. Before leaving, Lee confesses that he is not actually the strongest Genin, who is in fact someone else on his team, and that he only fought Sasuke to train himself. After Naruto pressures Sasuke over this turn of events, Team 7 reaches the room where the Chunnin Exams are to take place.
23	23	"Genin Takedown! All Nine Rookies Face Off!"; Transliteration: "Kechirase Raibaru! Rūkī Nain Zenin Shūgō" (Japanese: 蹴散らせライバル！新人9人(ルーキーナイン)全員集合)	Directed by : Yuki Hayashi; Storyboarded by : Toshiya Niidome	Michiko Yokote	Yasuhiko Kanezuka	March 13, 2003	February 11, 2006
Before entering the Chunin Exam hall, Team 7 are greeted by Kakashi, who informs them that all three of them had been required to consent to taking the exams before they would have been allowed in, and wished them luck. Once inside, Team 7 meet up with their classmates: Ino Yamanaka, Shikamaru Nara, and Choji Akimichi of Asuma's Team 10 and Shino Aburame, Hinata Hyuga, and Kiba Inuzuka of Kurenai's Team 8. The Rookie Nine have a spirited discussion, before they meet an exam veteran named Kabuto Yakushi, who informs them about each of the villages represented while also giving Sasuke information on Gaara and Lee. Though Kabuto intimidated the other Rookie Nine members by telling them that there were only elite Genin among the individuals taking the exams, Naruto loudly proclaims that he will beat every ninja in the room, to his friends's annoyance of being targeted by association. At that time, Kabuto is attacked by Team Dosu from the Hidden Sound Village for his earlier remark about their village. Although it appears that Kabuto dodged the attack, his glasses suddenly break and he becomes nauseated. Before the confrontation escalates any further, the examiner Ibiki Morino and his team enter to commence the Chunin Exams.
24	24	"Start Your Engines: The Chūnin Exam Begins!"; Transliteration: "Ikinari Shikkaku? Chō-nankan no Daiichi Shiken" (Japanese: いきなり失格？超難関の第一試験)	Mashu Itō	Satoru Nishizono	Takako Onishi	March 20, 2003	February 18, 2006
As everyone takes their seats, Ibiki explains that the first phase of the exam will be a written test where the teams with higher points continue to the next phase. Ibiki's assistants line the sides of the room to observe the Genin to ensure they do not cheat, with teams removed from the room if any member is caught cheating five times. With the exception of Naruto and Sakura, Sasuke and everyone else realise that the real test is to subtly cheat using their unique skills. While Sakura is able to answer the questions, Naruto is the opposite as he feels he must place all his faith in the final question, which will be given fifteen minutes before the test's end.
25	25	"The Tenth Question: All or Nothing!"; Transliteration: "Deta-toko Shōbu! Funbari Dokoro no Jū Monme" (Japanese: 出たとこ勝負！踏ん張りどころの10(じゅう)問目)	Directed by : Masaaki Kumagai; Storyboarded by : Toshiyuki Shimazu	Kou Hei Mushi	Yukiko Ban	March 27, 2003	February 25, 2006
Forty-five minutes into the written portion of the Chūnin Exams, Ibiki announces that it is time for the tenth and final question. But he ominously states that while their team would fail the exam if they do not take it, failure to answer it correctly would result in the participant being barred from any future Chunin Exams. Fretting over the unpredicted turn of events, Naruto refuses to give in to fear with his outburst putting the minds of those remaining at ease. Seeing that no one else would be leaving, Ibiki reveals that the first nine questions were to test their skills in intelligence gathering while the final question was to test their resolve. Passing Ibiki's test, the proctor was amused to find that Naruto passed without answering any of the questions, while the remaining Genin meet their next examiner Anko Mitarashi the next day at the site of the second phase of the exam: the Forest of Death.
26	26	"Special Report: Live from the Forest of Death!"; Transliteration: "Zettai Hikken! Shi no Mori Chokuzen Rupo! Konoha no Gakkyū Shinbunda Kore!" (Japanese: 絶対必見！死の森直前ルポ！木ノ葉の学級新聞だコレ！)	Hayato Date	Katsuyuki Sumisawa	Hiromi Okazaki	April 2, 2003	March 4, 2006
The episode is an anime-exclusive episode for Konohamaru and his classmates' news report starring the Chunin-in-training. Before the second exam can begin, Konohamaru and his friends pull the members of Team 7 aside for interviews, where they retell the story up until this point. They discuss about the Hokages and the rogue ninjas.
27	27	"The Chūnin Exam Stage 2: The Forest of Death"; Transliteration: "Daini Shiken Sutāto! Mawari wa Minna Teki Darake!" (Japanese: 第二試験スタート！周りはみんな敵だらけ！)	Directed by : Mitsutaka Noshitani; Storyboarded by : Ryō Yasumura	Akatsuki Yamatoya	Akihiro Tsuda	April 2, 2003	April 15, 2006
Anko briefs the candidates on their goal for the second portion of the exam. Each team is given one of two scrolls: a Heaven Scroll or an Earth Scroll. Once in the Forest, they must take the other scroll from an opposing team, and reach the tower in the centre of the forest with both to continue. After receiving their scroll, each team enters the Forest of Death simultaneously.
28	28	"Eat or Be Eaten: Panic in the Forest"; Transliteration: "Kū ka Kuwareru ka! Esa ni Natta Naruto" (Japanese: 喰うか喰われるか！エサになったナルト)	Masahiko Murata	Satoru Nishizono	Masaru Hyodo	April 9, 2003	April 15, 2006
A few minutes after entering the Forest of Death, Naruto leaves the team to relieve himself, but he is knocked out by a Genin from the Hidden Rain Village who mimics his appearance to infiltrate Team 7. Luckily, seeing through the disguise, Sasuke drives away the attacking Rain Genin. While he and his team mates go over a password to identify themselves in such a situation, Naruto is separated from the others by a powerful gust of wind before being swallowed by a giant snake. In the meantime, Sasuke and Sakura are disabled by a Grass ninja named Shiore. Before they even fight, Sasuke and Sakura have visions of their own deaths upon looking into Shiore's eyes, paralysing them with fear. Regaining his composure, Sasuke flees with Sakura as Shiore pursues. Luckily, having managed to kill the snake, Naruto arrives in time to save them both.
29	29	"Naruto's Counterattack: Never Give In!"; Transliteration: "Naruto Hangeki! Nigenēndattebayo!" (Japanese: ナルト反撃！逃げねーんだってばよ！)	Directed by : Takeyuki Sadohara; Storyboarded by : Hitoyuki Matsui	Michiko Yokote	Jong Ki Choi	April 16, 2003	April 15, 2006
Despite Naruto's timely appearance, Sasuke offers Shiore the scroll in exchange for their lives. Sasuke then throws the scroll to Shiore but Naruto intercepts it. Naruto punches Sasuke during his attempt to convince Naruto to give the scroll up, causing Naruto to accuse Sasuke of being an impostor as the Sasuke he knew would never be so weak and cowardly. Shiore summons a giant snake and engages Naruto, who uses the Nine-Tails's chakra to fight. Eventually, upon learning that his opponent is the host of the Nine-Tails, Shiore used the Five-Pronged Seal and seals Naruto's ability to access the demon fox's power. As Naruto's unconscious body is saved by Sakura pinning it to a tree with a kunai in mid-air, Sasuke manages to muster the courage from Naruto's words to fight while activates his Sharingan. Meanwhile, Anko learns of three faceless corpses found near the exams, one of them revealed to be Shiore, and recognizes the technique used to remove their faces.
30	30	"The Sharingan Revived: Dragon-Flame Jutsu!"; Transliteration: "Yomigaere Sharingan! Hissatsu: Katon Ryūka no Jutsu!" (Japanese: 蘇れ写輪眼！必殺・火遁龍火の術！)	Atsushi Wakabayashi	Kou Hei Mushi	Atsushi Wakabayashi	April 23, 2003	April 22, 2006
After a protracted battle with the mysterious ninja posing as Shiore, Sasuke traps Shiore and uses the Dragon Flame technique to incinerate his attacker. However, Shiore is still alive with his face partially melted off, revealing part of Shiore's true face. After extending his neck to inflict Sasuke with an unidentified mark, the ninja introduces himself as Orochimaru. Burning the scroll he possessed, Orochimaru leaves while promising that Sasuke will look for him in the future. Anko eventually finds Orochimaru, revealed to be her former teacher, and unsuccessfully tries to kill him while learning that his target was Sasuke, and that any interference in the Chunin Exams to remove the youth from the proceedings would end terribly for the Hidden Leaf Village.
31	31	"Bushy Brow's Pledge: Undying Love and Protection!"; Transliteration: "Gekimayu Puratonikku! Boku wa Shinu Made Anata o Mamoru!!" (Japanese: 激まゆプラトニック！僕は死ぬまでアナタを守る!!)	Directed by : Hiroshi Kimura; Storyboarded by : Yuichiro Miyake	Satoru Nishizono	Kazuhisa Kosuge	April 30, 2003	April 29, 2006
After the ordeal with Orochimaru, Sakura managed to move her team mates under a tree to tend to their wounds overnight. During this time, Sakura is unaware that her team are being watched by Team Dosu, and wards off a squirrel that they had placed a paper bomb onto, without knowing that it had been made into an explosive device. Soon after, the Sound Genin make their presence known as they reveal their intent to kill Sasuke while dealing with the numerous traps that Sakura had prepared to defend her teammates. Luckily, having been guided by the squirrel after saving it, Lee arrives to protect Sakura. As the battle ensued, Lee uses the Primary Lotus on Dosu but the impact is cushioned by Zaku Abumi and Lee is knocked out.
32	32	"Sakura Blossoms!"; Transliteration: "Sakura Saku! Ketsui no Ushiro Sugata" (Japanese: サクラ咲く！決意の後ろ姿)	Masahiko Murata	Michiko Yokote	Yukiko Ban	May 7, 2003	May 6, 2006
With her teammates and Lee all unconscious, Sakura is forced to fight on her own before one of the Sound Genin, Kin Tsuchi, grabs the girl by her hair and proceeds to insult her for her perceived vanity. This causes Sakura to remember her past with her own rival, Ino, and she is reminded of the reasons for growing her hair so long. She then decides to focus on being a strong ninja rather than just attractive, cutting her hair to free herself from Kin's grasp before attacking Zaku. Moved by Sakura's determination, Ino and the rest of Team 10 come to her aid.
33	33	"Battle Formation: Ino–Shika–Chō!!"; Transliteration: "Muteki no Fōmēshon! Ino–Shika–Chō!!" (Japanese: 無敵のフォーメーション！いのシカチョウ!!)	Rion Kujo	Katsuyuki Sumisawa	Yukimaro Ōtsubo	May 14, 2003	May 13, 2006
Team 10 battles Team Dosu, each using their unique techniques to battle. However, though Ino uses her Mind Transfer technique on Kin, the Sound Genin regain the advantage before Sasuke suddenly awakens. Empowered by Orochimaru's Curse Seal of Heaven, Sasuke becomes cruel and sadistic as he easily defeats Zaku while breaking his arms. Terrified by Sasuke's extremely cruel brutality, Sakura stops him before he can inflict fatal injuries on either of the remaining Sound Genin. Deciding that they stand no chance, Dosu leaves their scroll behind so that he and his team can retreat without further harm.
34	34	"Akamaru Trembles: Gaara's Cruel Strength!"; Transliteration: "Akamaru Bikkuri! Gaara, Kyōi no Jitsuryoku" (Japanese: 赤丸ビックリ！我愛羅、驚異の実力)	Directed by : Mitsutaka Noshitani; Storyboarded by : Yasuhiro Minami	Akatsuki Yamatoya	Akihiro Tsuda	May 21, 2003	May 20, 2006
As Team 7, Team 10, and Team Guy recover, Team 8 witnesses Gaara mercilessly kill a team of Rain Genin. Although Gaara prepares to turn his attention to Team 8, his siblings persuade him to leave them alone. Gaara's team beats the previous record for getting to the tower by a gigantic margin, and none of them are even remotely injured.
35	35	"The Scroll's Secret: No Peeking Allowed"; Transliteration: "Nozokimi Genkin! Makimono no Himitsu" (Japanese: のぞき見厳禁！巻き物の秘密)	Directed by : Masaaki Kumagai; Storyboarded by : Hidehito Ueda	Kou Hei Mushi	Yasuhiko Kanezuka	May 28, 2003	May 27, 2006
Naruto awakens and, upon realizing that they need another scroll to pass, decides to forge a new one, but has to open their existing scroll to do so, an action banned by the rules of the exam. However, before he could do so, Kabuto, separated from his team, stops him, stating that those who did would be rendered unconscious until the end of the exam. He then accompanies Team 7 to the tower in the center of the forest. Along the way, the group encounters a genjutsu set by the Rain Genin group whose teammate Sasuke had defeated previously. By the time they realize that they are not getting any closer to the center of the forest, they are ambushed by a number of clones.

== Home media release ==
=== English ===
==== DVD ====
Naruto Uncut (USA)
Volume	Date	Discs	Episodes	Reference
1	July 4, 2006	3	1–13	
2	December 5, 2006	3	14–25	
3	May 29, 2007	3	26–38	

Naruto Season Box Set (USA)
Box Set	Date	Discs	Episodes	Reference
Season 1, Vol. 1	October 6, 2009	6	1–25	
Season 1, Vol. 2	November 24, 2009	6	26–52	

Naruto Unleashed (UK)
Volume	Date	Box Set Release	Disc	Episodes	Reference
Series 1 Part 1	August 21, 2006	September 3, 2007	3	1–13	
Series 1 Part 2	December 26, 2006	September 3, 2007	3	14–26	
Series 2 Part 1	May 21, 2007	December 24, 2007	3	27–39	

Naruto Uncut (AUS / NZ)
Collection	Episodes	DVD release date	Reference
1	1–13	May 14, 2008	
2	14–25	June 11, 2008	
3	26–38	July 23, 2008	

Naruto Origins (AUS / NZ)
Collection	Episodes	DVD release date	Reference
1	1–52	May 24, 2017	

==== Blu-ray ====
Viz Media (Region 1/A)
Set	Date	Discs	Episodes	References
1	November 3, 2020	4	1–27	
2	February 16, 2021	4	28–55	
