= Starship Troopers (franchise) =

Military science fiction media franchise

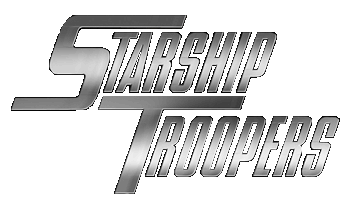
- Official franchise logo
- Created by: Robert A. Heinlein (original novel); Edward Neumeier and Paul Verhoeven (film and Sony Pictures–owned adaptations) (Note: Both Neumeier and Verhoeven are involved on the writing of the movie; the former received the screenplay credit. Four of the five films that form the main continuity of the movie universe (including the first movie itself) were written by Neumeier.)
- Original work: Starship Troopers (1959)
- Owners: Heinlein Prize Trust (publishing); TriStar Pictures (Sony Pictures Entertainment) (multimedia)
- Years: 1959–present

Print publications
- Novel(s): Starship Troopers (1959)

Films and television
- Film(s): Starship Troopers (1997)
- Animated series: Starship Troopers (1988); Roughnecks: Starship Troopers Chronicles (1999–2000)
- Television film(s): Starship Troopers 2: Hero of the Federation (2004)
- Direct-to-video: Starship Troopers 3: Marauder (2008); Starship Troopers: Invasion (2012); Starship Troopers: Traitor of Mars (2017)

Games
- Traditional: Starship Troopers (1976); Starship Troopers: The Miniatures Game (2005)
- Role-playing: Starship Troopers: The Roleplaying Game (2005)
- Video game(s): Starship Troopers: Terran Ascendancy (2000); Starship Troopers (2005); Starship Troopers: Terran Command (2022); Starship Troopers: Extermination (2023)

Miscellaneous
- Pinball: Starship Troopers (1997)

Official website
- starshiptroopers.com

Starship Troopers is an American military science fiction media franchise based on the 1959 novel of the same name by Robert A. Heinlein and the satirical 1997 film adaptation by screenwriter Edward Neumeier and director Paul Verhoeven.

== Setting ==
The series is set hundreds of years in the future, after a collapse of Western democracy and many resulting wars. In this future, human society is now ruled by the Terran Federation, a government run by military veterans. Military service is voluntary, but required to earn the full rights of citizenship, such as holding office and voting.

Much of the series focuses on the experiences of Juan "Johnny" Rico and the lessons he learns enlisting in military service along with his hometown friends, Carmen Ibanez (a love interest who becomes a pilot) and Carl (who, in the films, is shown as being a psychic who joins military intelligence). Johnny joins the 'Mobile Infantry', the primary foot soldiers of the Federation (depicted in the book as having advanced armored suits equipped with jetpacks and nuclear weapons). While Johnny is in training, an alien species known as the "Arachnids" attacks Buenos Aires, resulting in the death of Johnny's family (only his mother in the books, his entire family in the film). After this, the Federation goes to war and the series follows their attempts to defeat the "bugs", especially by capturing part of the Arachnid ruling class.

== Novel ==
=== Starship Troopers (1959) ===
At some point between 1958 and 1959, Robert Heinlein put aside the novel that would become Stranger in a Strange Land and wrote Starship Troopers. His motivation arose partially from his anger at US President Dwight Eisenhower's decision to suspend US nuclear tests, and the Soviet tests that occurred soon afterward. Writing in his 1980 volume Expanded Universe, Heinlein would say that the publication of a newspaper advertisement placed by the National Committee for a Sane Nuclear Policy on April 5, 1958, calling for a unilateral suspension of nuclear weapons testing by the United States sparked his desire to write Starship Troopers. Heinlein and his wife Virginia created the "Patrick Henry League" in an attempt to create support for the US nuclear testing program. Heinlein stated that he used the novel to clarify his military and political views.

Like many of Heinlein's books, Starship Troopers was completed in a few weeks. It was originally written as a juvenile novel for New York publishing house Scribner; Heinlein had previously had success with this format, having written several such novels published by Scribner. The manuscript was rejected, prompting Heinlein to end his association with the publisher completely, and resume writing books with adult themes. Scholars have suggested that Scribner's rejection was based on ideological objections to the content of the novel, particularly its treatment of military conflict.

The Magazine of Fantasy & Science Fiction first published Starship Troopers in October and November 1959 as a two-part serial titled Starship Soldier.

Commentators have written that Starship Troopers is not driven by its plot, though it contains scenes of military combat. Instead, much of the novel is given over to a discussion of ideas. In particular, the discussion of political views is a recurring feature of what scholar Jeffrey Cass described as an "ideologically intense" book. A 1997 review in Salon categorized it as a "philosophical novel". Critics have debated to what extent the novel promotes Heinlein's own political views. Some contend that the novel maintains a sense of irony that allows readers to draw their own conclusions; others argue that Heinlein is sermonizing throughout the book, and that its purpose is to expound Heinlein's militaristic philosophy.

== Films ==
=== Live-action ===
Film	U.S. release date	Director(s)	Screenwriter(s)	Producer(s)
Starship Troopers	November 7, 1997	Paul Verhoeven	Edward Neumeier	Jon Davison; Alan Marshall
Starship Troopers 2: Hero of the Federation	April 24, 2004	Phil Tippett	Edward Neumeier	Jon Davison
Starship Troopers 3: Marauder	August 5, 2008	Edward Neumeier	Edward Neumeier	David Lancaster
Starship Troopers	TBA	Neill Blomkamp	Neill Blomkamp	Neill Blomkamp & Terri Tatchell

==== Starship Troopers (1997) ====
Humans, in a fascist militaristic future, wage war with giant alien bugs.

==== Starship Troopers 2: Hero of the Federation (2004) ====
In the sequel to Paul Verhoeven's loved/reviled sci-fi film, a group of troopers taking refuge in an abandoned outpost after fighting alien bugs, failing to realize that more danger lays in wait.

==== Starship Troopers 3: Marauder (2008) ====
Johnny Rico is called back into action to defeat the bugs.

==== Future ====
In December 2011, film producer Neal H. Moritz announced plans to produce a reboot of the Starship Troopers film franchise. In November 2016, Columbia and Moritz announced the writing team of Mark Swift and Damian Shannon had been signed to pen the screenplay. Verhoeven expressed skepticism at the proposed remake, citing reports that it draws heavily from the original militaristic 1959 novel. In 2025, Neill Blomkamp was announced to write and direct a new adaptation of Starship Troopers which would be closer to the source material than the Verhoeven film.

=== Animated ===
Film	U.S. release date	Director(s)	Screenwriter(s)	Story by	Producer(s)
Starship Troopers: Invasion	August 28, 2012	Shinji Aramaki	Flint Dille	Shinji Aramaki; Joseph Chou; Shigehito Kawada	Joseph Chou
Starship Troopers: Traitor of Mars	August 21, 2017	Shinji Aramaki; Masaru Matsumoto	Edward Neumeier	Edward Neumeier	Joseph Chou; Max Nishi; Tomi Hashimoto

==== Starship Troopers: Invasion (2012) ====
A black op has gone terribly wrong. Now, Captain Carmen Ibanez and a hardcore trooper famed as Major Henry "Hero" Varro must lead a team of battle-weary troopers to find the missing ship and discover what went wrong.

==== Starship Troopers: Traitor of Mars (2017) ====
Federation trooper, Johnny Rico's ordered to work with a group of new recruits on a satellite station on Mars, where giant bugs have decided to target their next attack.

== Television ==
Series	Episodes	First released	Last released	Showrunner(s)	Network(s)
Starship Troopers	6	October 25, 1988	December 17, 1988	Tetsurō Amino	—N/a
Roughnecks: Starship Troopers Chronicles	36 + 4 clip shows	August 30, 1999	April 3, 2000	Richard Raynis	BKN

=== Starship Troopers (1988) ===
Mysterious monstrous alien creatures attack Earth's colonies. This six-part OVA focuses on Juan "Johnnie" Rico who joins the army because of Carmen, a girl he likes, his days in boot camps, his losses and Earth's first counterattack.

=== Roughnecks: Starship Troopers Chronicles (1999–2000) ===
The missions of a Mobile Infantry squad as they participate in a war of survival against a ferocious alien insectoid invader.

== Video games ==
Video game	U.S. release date	Developer	Publisher	Platform(s)
Starship Troopers	1979	Dendron Amusements	Dendron Amusements	CP/M
Klendathu	1982	Leo B. Christopherson	Tandy Corporation	TRS-80 Color Computer
Starship Troopers	1997	MGA Entertainment	MGA Entertainment	Handheld LCD game
Starship Troopers: Battlespace	1998	Mythic Entertainment	Kesmai	Windows
Starship Troopers: Terran Ascendancy	October 23, 2000	Blue Tongue Entertainment	Hasbro Interactive	Windows
Starship Troopers	October 27, 2005	Strangelite	Empire Interactive and Destineer	Windows
Starship Troopers: Roughnecks	2007	Elocom Mobile	Ojom	Mobile
Starship Troopers: Invasion - Mobile Infantry	November 13, 2012	Spectre Media	Spectre Media	iOS
Starship Troopers: Terran Command	June 16, 2022	The Artistocrats	Slitherine Software	Windows
Starship Troopers: Extermination	October 11, 2024	Offworld Industries	Offworld Industries	Windows, PlayStation 5, Xbox Series XS
Starship Troopers: Continuum	November 14, 2024	XR Games	Sony Pictures Virtual Reality	PlayStation 5, Meta Quest
Starship Troopers: Ultimate Bug War!	March 16, 2026	Auroch Digital	Dotemu	Windows, PlayStation 5, Xbox Series XS, Nintendo Switch 2

== Cast and characters ==
List indicators
- This table shows the principal characters and the actors who have portrayed them throughout the franchise.
- A dark grey cell indicates the character was not in the film or video game, or that the character's presence in the film or video game has not yet been announced.
- A ^{V} indicates a voice only role.

Character	Anime series	Original series			Animated films		Animated series
Character	Starship Troopers	Starship Troopers	Starship Troopers 2: Hero of the Federation	Starship Troopers 3: Marauder	Starship Troopers: Invasion	Starship Troopers: Traitor of Mars	Roughnecks: Starship Troopers Chronicles
Character	1988	1997	2004	2008	2012	2017	1999–2000
Fed Net Announcer		John Cunningham^{V}	Stephen Stanton^{V}	Corey Burton^{V}		Andrew Love^{V}	
Juan D. Rico John "Johnny" Rico	Yasunori Matsumoto^{V}	Casper Van Dien		Casper Van Dien	David Matranga^{V}	Casper Van Dien^{V}	Rino Romano^{V}
Carl Jenkins	Yūji Mitsuya^{V}	Neil Patrick Harris			Justin Doran^{V}	Justin Doran^{V}	Rider Strong^{V}
Carmencita Ibañez Carmen	Rei Sakuma^{V}	Denise Richards			Luci Christian^{V}	Luci Christian^{V}	Tish Hicks^{V}
Charles Zim Charlie	Akira Kamiya^{V}	Clancy Brown					Clancy Brown^{V}
Yvette Deladrier	Mika Doi^{V}	Brenda Strong					
Emilio Rico Bill	Shinji Ogawa^{V}	Christopher Curry					
Mrs. Maria Rico	Kazuko Yanaga^{V}	Lenore Kasdorf					
Smith Alphard Kitten	Kazuhiko Inoue^{V}	Matt Levin					
Pat Leivy Ace	Shō Hayami^{V}	Jake Busey					
Ian Frankel	Tomomichi Nishimura^{V}						
Theodore C. Hendrick Ted	Kazuyuki Sogabe^{V}						
Greg Paterson	Hirotaka Suzuoki^{V}						
T. Azuma	Shūichi Ikeda^{V}						
S. Cherenkov	Masahiro Anzai^{V}						
Clea	Saeko Shimazu^{V}						
Dunn	Shingo Hiromori^{V}						
Isabelle Flores Dizzy		Dina Meyer				Dina Meyer^{V}	Elizabeth Daily^{V}
Shujumi		Anthony Ruivivar					
Jean Rasczak		Michael Ironside					Jamie Hanes^{V}
Zander Barcalow		Patrick Muldoon					Nicholas Guest^{V}
Breckenridge		Eric Bruskotter					
"Birdie" Byrd		Ungela Brockman					
Djana'D		Tami-Adrian George					
Katrina McIntire		Blake Lindsley					
Lei Sahara			Colleen Porch				
V.J. Dax			Richard Burgi				
Pavlov Dill			Lawrence Monoson				
Dede Rake (née Deladier)			Brenda Strong				
Dix Hauser				Boris Kodjoe			
Lola Beck				Jolene Blalock			
Omar Anoke				Stephen Hogan			
Enolo Phid				Amanda Donohoe			
Holly Little				Marnette Patterson			
Bull Brittles				Stelio Savante			
J. Kirby				Nicole Salandra			
"Slug" Skinner				Garth Breytenbach			
A. Sunday				Tanya van Graan			
Link Manion				Cécile Breccia			
A. Danner				Graeme Richards			
M. Hightower				Antonio Summerton			
Elmo Goniff				Joe Vaz			
Tony Daugherty					Sam Roman^{V}		
"Ice Blonde"					Melissa Davis^{V}		
Tia Durer Trig					Emily Neves^{V}		
"Mech"					Jovan Jackson^{V}		
Henry Varro Hero					David Wald^{V}		
Otis Hacks Bugspray					Andrew Love^{V}		
"Ratzass"					Leraldo Anzaldua^{V}	Leraldo Anzaldua^{V}	
"Holy Man"					Kalob Martinez^{V}		
Francis Brutto							David DeLuise^{V}
Richard LaCroix Doc							James Horan^{V}
Jeff Gossard Goss							Bill Fagerbakke^{V}
"Colonel" T'Phai							Steve Staley^{V}
Marlow							Thomas Wagner^{V}
Miriam Redwing							Irene Bedard^{V}
Sanchez							R. Lee Ermey^{V}
Earl Walker							Michael Harrington^{V}

== Reception ==
=== Critical and public response ===
Film	Rotten Tomatoes	Metacritic	CinemaScore
Starship Troopers	72% (82 reviews)	51 (20 reviews)	C+
Starship Troopers 2: Hero of the Federation	33% (6 reviews)	—N/a	—N/a
Starship Troopers 3: Marauder	43% (7 reviews)	—N/a	—N/a
Starship Troopers: Invasion	—N/a (4 reviews)	—N/a	—N/a
Starship Troopers: Traitor of Mars	—N/a (4 reviews)	—N/a	—N/a

== Sources ==
- Booker, M. Keith; Thomas, Anne-Marie (2009). The Science Fiction Handbook. Singapore: John Wiley & Sons. ISBN 9781405162067. Archived from the original on March 13, 2023.
- Cass, Jeffrey (April 1999). "SS Troopers: Cybernostalgia and Paul Verhoeven's Fascist Flirtation". Studies in Popular Culture. 21 (3): 51–63. JSTOR 23414533.
- Heinlein, Robert A. (2003). Expanded Universe. New York City, New York, US: Baen. ISBN 0-7434-7159-8. OCLC 223822885.
