= Starship Troopers: Invasion =

2012 American-Japanese anime film by Shinji Aramaki

- Official DVD cover

Japanese name
- Kanji: スターシップ・トゥルーパーズ インベイジョン
Transcriptions
- Revised Hepburn: Sutāshippu Turūpāzu Inbeijon
- Directed by: Shinji Aramaki
- Screenplay by: Flint Dille
- Story by: Shigehito Kawada; Shinji Aramaki; Joseph Chou
- Based on: Starship Troopers by Robert A. Heinlein
- Produced by: Joseph Chou
- Music by: Tetsuya Takahashi
- Production companies: Sola Digital Arts; Stage 6 Films; Lucent Pictures
- Distributed by: Sony Pictures Home Entertainment
- Release dates: July 21, 2012 (Japan); August 28, 2012 (United States)
- Running time: 89 minutes
- Countries: Japan; United States
- Languages: English; Japanese

Starship Troopers: Invasion (Japanese: スターシップ・トゥルーパーズ インベイジョン, Hepburn: Sutāshippu Turūpāzu Inbeijon) is a 2012 Japanese adult animated military science fiction horror film directed by Shinji Aramaki. It is the fourth installment of the Starship Troopers franchise. The film was released in Japan on July 21, 2012, and in North America on August 28, 2012, as a direct-to-video title.

The film was followed by Starship Troopers: Traitor of Mars (2017).

== Plot ==
On an asteroid, the Terran Federation's Fort Casey is crawling with bugs. The starship Alesia begins to deploy its Mobile Infantry troopers, by dropship, to seize and control the hangar and rescue any survivors. Lt. Daugherty's Alpha Team lands and immediately engages bugs, fighting through to rendezvous with the surviving Fort Casey troopers. After setting explosives charges, the troopers head to the starship John A. Warden for evacuation, only to see it leave dock without them—Minister Carl Jenkins has commandeered the Warden from Captain Carmen Ibanez, sending her to Alesia. Before leaving, Jenkins orders that Major Henry "Hero" Varro, the commander of Fort Casey's K-12 troopers, be escorted to Alesia as a prisoner. Alesia docks with Fort Casey for emergency evacuation of the surviving troopers, and the Fort Casey asteroid is successfully destroyed.

While en route to Earth, Alesia is contacted by General Johnny Rico from High Command at L-6 Base. When he orders Alesia to search for the Warden, which has broken all contact, the Fort Casey troopers agree to do so on condition that Varro lead them during the mission. When they find the Warden, Daugherty's team escorts Ibanez to the bridge while Varro's team secures the engine room, both teams finding nothing but dead crewmen and a few dead bugs. Varro finds a deranged Jenkins who warns him—too late—not to power up the Warden because "she" has hacked all the systems. As engines recharge the Warden, an Arachnid Queen inside takes control of all systems and opens bulkhead doors to release her bugs. As Ibanez and the troopers attempt to return to Alesia, the Queen uses Warden's main weapons to destroy the other ship, then flies Warden into a wormhole whose outlet is in near-Earth space. The troopers return to the bridge, where Varro reveals he was arrested when Jenkins had ordered his unit to capture the Queen alive on Fort Casey, but Varro had refused to sacrifice his squad.

General Rico deploys three starships from L-6 Base in Earth orbit, but the Queen hijacks the Warden's weaponry and destroys them. The Queen sets the bug-infested Warden on a trajectory to crash land in Paris, but Alpha Team sniper Tia "Trig" Durer manages to shoot out the wires linking the Queen to the ship, allowing Ibanez to re-direct the Warden to crash land in the Alps. Meanwhile, General Rico leads a squad of troopers in Marauder suits to stop the bugs from escaping the crash site, while high command gives him thirty minutes before dropping nukes from the L-6 Station to sanitize the site.

Back on the Warden, the five surviving troopers make their way toward the Queen. Ice Blonde protects Ibanez at a nearby airlock while Mech and Ratzass go to the engine room to blow it up. When Varro and Bugspray find Trig's corpse, Bugspray uses Trig's family-made sniper rifle to buy Varro some time to reach the queen. Jenkins, having recovered from his mental breakdown, provides Varro backup with bugs under his mind control—revealing an important Terran breakthrough in the war effort, and the reason for capturing a live Queen.

Rico is the lone survivor from his squad to reach the Warden. The extraction shuttle from L-6, and the nuclear strike, are all destroyed by the Queen's control of the Warden's weapons. As Jenkins leads the team to his shuttle from Fort Casey, Rico rushes to distract the Queen and rescue Varro. Varro, critically injured, blows a grenade when surrounded by bugs. Rico abandons his broken Marauder suit and uses a combat knife on one of the Queen's eyes, buying Ibanez time to make takeoff preparations. Rico sprints back into the dropship as it barely escapes the Warden before the explosives detonate and destroy the Warden.

Mech, Ice, and Ratzass pay their respect to their fallen comrades while Ibanez confronts Jenkins over the recent crises. Jenkins sidesteps the issue, telling Rico and Ibanez that his research will someday save the entire galaxy. After the closing credits, one warrior bug is seen navigating a sewer system, having inexplicably survived the Warden's destruction.

== Cast ==
The voice cast as presented in order of closing credits:

- Luci Christian as Carmen Ibanez, captain of the John A. Warden
- Justin Doran as Carl Jenkins, Minister of Paranormal Warfare
- David Matranga as Johnny Rico, general from High Command at L-6 Base.
- David Wald as Hero, Major Henry Varro, commander of K-12 team. He is brave and considered an incredible soldier, killing bugs even after grievous injuries and loss of limbs. He is one of the last soldiers to die, sacrificing himself for Rico.
- Andrew Love as Bugspray, Lieutenant Otis Hacks, acting commander of K-12 team. He forms a relationship with Trig after saving her and is overrun by bugs after fulfilling her desire, simultaneously buying Hero time to reach the Queen. He is close friends with Ratzass.
- Leraldo Anzaldua as Ratzass, sergeant from K-12 team. He is a rowdy soldier with a raging libido, although his fighting skills are not to be questioned. He is close friends with Bugspray.
- Sam Roman as Daugherty, Lieutenant Tony Daugherty, commander of A-1 team. He is respected amongst his subordinates, but is killed when the John A. Warden crashes.
- Emily Neves as Trig, Tia Durer, sniper from A-1 team. She fights for vengeance for a previous battle that left hundreds of civilians dead, swearing that one bug will die for each victim of the battle. She is killed by the Queen's bugs after severing the Queen's connection to the John A. Warden. She forms a relationship with Bugspray, who saves her from death at the beginning of the movie.
- Melissa Davis as Ice Blonde, corporal from A-1 team. She flirts with her teammates but is a soldier at heart. She is revealed to be mother and widow whose husband died on another planet
- Kalob Martinez as Holyman, private from K-12 team. He rarely speaks, he mostly points at various tattoos of prayer symbols and pantomimes certain actions. He believes different symbols will protect him and his teammates in different battles, and he is killed saving Ice Blonde. He is close friends with Kharon.
- Chris Patton as Kharon, private from K-12 team. He is killed during the John A. Warden's evacuation, caught by a bug on the way to the airlock. He holds the line, and is swiftly overrun. He is close friends with Holyman.
- Adam Gibbs as Shock Jock, medic from A-1 team. He dies when the Queen fires the John A. Warden's weapons at the Alesia.
- Jovan Jackson as Mech, sergeant and explosives specialist from A-1 team.
- Corey Hartzog as Chase, scout from K-12 team. He is Hero's right hand, accompanying him to the airlock, but fails to make a jump, falling into a pit of bugs. He then detonates a grenade, killing himself to buy time for Hero.
- Josh Grelle as Chow, private first class from A-1 team. He is a solitary martial artist and technical expert, focusing on speed. He fights Ratzass hand-to-hand after being provoked, a match which ended in a tie with Ratzass in a daze from various kicks and headlocks from Chow, and one single heavy blow from Ratzass. He reactivates the engine of the John A. Warden but inadvertently also releases the bugs. He kills many bugs as well, even killing one with his martial arts skills after losing his rifle, but is eventually overrun and stabbed in the shoulder.
- Karl Glusman as Gunfodder, private from K-12 team. He loses an arm at the beginning of the film, which is replaced by a prosthetic by Shock Jock. He is caught after Kharon, just barely before reaching the airlock. A bug snaps his prosthetic off, and with his rifle jammed, he is unable to return fire, although Shock Jock rescues him. He dies of his injuries shortly after.
- Shelley Calene-Black as Captain Jonah, captain of the Alesia, killed along with the rest of the crew when the queen uses the John A. Warden's weapons to destroy the Alesia.
- Noel Burkeen as Crysoch
- Andy McAvin as High Command
- Michael Keeney as Communication Officer 1
- Kris Carr as Communication Officer 2

== Production ==
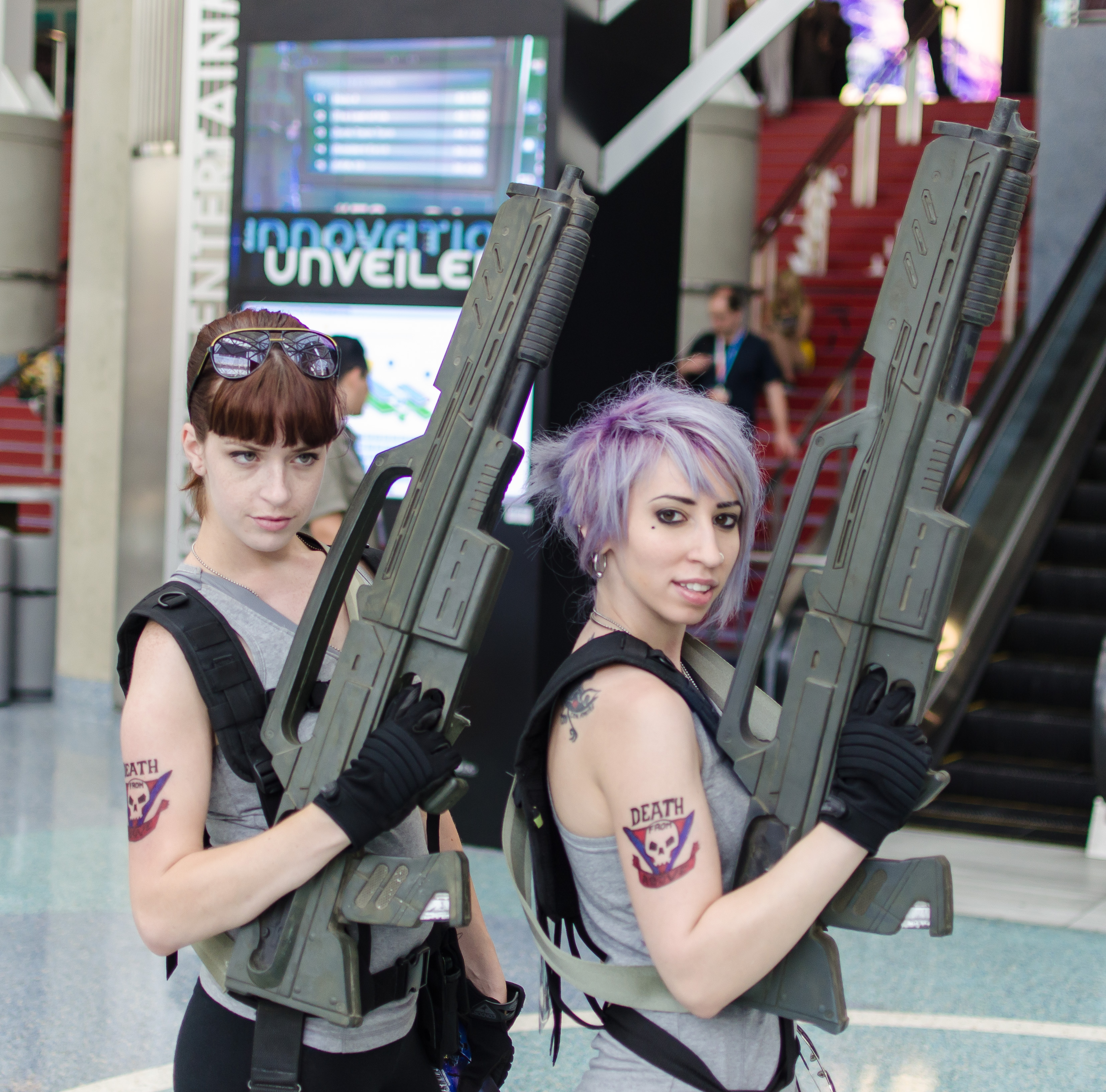
Promotion of the tie-in game at E3 2012

Edward Neumeier, writer of the three previous films in the series, and Casper Van Dien, actor playing the protagonist Johnny Rico in the first and the third film, are attached as executive producers. According to Neumeier, he was allowed to have as much impact as he wished in his consulting role but his involvement ended up rather limited. Once the script was finished, it took about a year-and-a-half to complete the film. If the film was successful, there was a possibility of further sequels by the same creative team.

The characters of Johnny Rico, Carl Jenkins, and Carmen Ibanez return from the original Starship Troopers; despite some pre-release rumors to the contrary, all three roles were recast with new actors rather than the original cast.

The recording was done at Seraphim Digital in Houston, Texas. Several of the actors that were in the film also did the motion capture for several of the characters.

A mobile game that acts as a prequel to the series, called Starship Troopers: Invasion – Mobile Infantry, was released worldwide via the App Store on November 13, 2012.

== See also ==
- List of films featuring space stations
