= Tanya van Graan =

South African actress, singer and model (born 1983)

- Born: 13 December 1983 (age 42); Cape Town, South Africa
- Occupations: Actress; model; singer
- Years active: 2003–present
- Spouse: Kasper Kristofferson (m. 2014)

Tanya van Graan (born 13 December 1983) is a South African actress, singer and model. She is known for her roles in Zulu and Starship Troopers 3: Marauder, and for being FHM's Sexiest Woman at the 2007 FHM 100 Sexiest Women in the World bash held in Johannesburg.

== Career ==
In addition to appearances in South African productions, she appeared in the science fiction film Starship Troopers 3: Marauder, by Edward Neumeier, as Sergeant A. Sunday, alongside Jolene Blalock and Casper Van Dien.

In 2010, she starred in the horror comedy Lost Boys: The Thirst as Lily, alongside Tanit Phoenix and Corey Feldman. In the same year she played the role of Holly in the action movie Death Race 2 and worked again with Tanit Phoenix in front of the camera as well as its sequel, Death Race 3: Inferno, released in 2013. In the movie, van Graan played the character Amber and stood as before, in addition to Luke Goss, Danny Trejo and Ving Rhames before the camera. All three films of the Death Race series were released as Direct-to-DVD.

In 2013, Van Graan starred as Tara in the thriller movie Zulu of Jérôme Salle, alongside Orlando Bloom and Forest Whitaker.

== Filmography ==
=== Film ===
Year	Title	Role	Notes
2004	Kofifi	Karen	
2008	Starship Troopers 3: Marauder	Sergeant A. Sunday	
2010	Mad Cow the Movie	Charlize	Lead actress
2010	Lost Boys: The Thirst	Lily	
2010	Death Race 2	Holly	
2013	Death Race 3: Inferno	Amber	
2013	Zulu	Tara	
2013	Jimmy in Pien	Judge #2	
2014	SEAL Team 8: Behind Enemy Lines	Female Tech / Collins	
2014	Die Spook van Uniondale	Marie	
2016	Geraubte Wahrheit	Melissa	
2017	24 Hours to Live	Jasmine Morrow	
2018	Tremors: A Cold Day in Hell	Dr. Rita Sims	
2020	The Empty Man	Allison Lasombra	
2021	Escape Room: Tournament of Champions	Sonya	Extended cut version
2022	Redeeming Love	Sally	
2025	Muzzle: City of Wolves	Mia	
2026	Hive	Camille	

=== Television ===
Year	Title	Role	Notes
2004	Snitch	Talen Aimes	Guest; Season 1 Episode 1
2008	Strictly Come Dancing	Herself	Reality Show
2008	Malan en Kie	Chantelle	
2017	Dating Game Killer	Shauna Bradshaw	TV film
2020	Raised by Wolves	Lempo	(1) Season 1 Episode 3: "Virtual Faith" (2) Season 1 Episode 4: "Nature's Course" (3) Season 1 Episode 5: "Infected Memory" (4) Season 1 Episode 6: "Lost Paradise"
2020	Professionals	Romy Brandt	10 episodes
