= Starship Troopers: Traitor of Mars =

2017 American-Japanese anime film by Shinji Aramaki

- Promotional release poster

Japanese name
- Kanji: スターシップ・トゥルーパーズ：レッドプラネット
Transcriptions
- Revised Hepburn: Sutāshippu to~urūpāzu: Reddopuranetto
- Directed by: Shinji Aramaki; Masaru Matsumoto
- Written by: Edward Neumeier
- Based on: Starship Troopers by Robert A. Heinlein
- Produced by: Joseph Chou; Max Nishi; Tomi Hashimoto
- Starring: Casper Van Dien; Dina Meyer; DeRay Davis
- Music by: Tetsuya Takahashi
- Production companies: Sola Digital Arts; Stage 6 Films; Lucent Pictures
- Distributed by: Sony Pictures Home Entertainment
- Release date: August 21, 2017
- Running time: 88 minutes
- Countries: Japan; United States
- Language: English

Starship Troopers: Traitor of Mars (Japanese: スターシップ・トゥルーパーズ：レッドプラネット, Hepburn: Sutāshippu to~urūpāzu: Reddopuranetto) is a 2017 Japanese adult animated military science fiction film directed by Shinji Aramaki and Masaru Matsumoto and written by Edward Neumeier. The film is a sequel to Starship Troopers: Invasion (2012) and the fifth installment of the Starship Troopers franchise. It also marks the return of two original actors; Casper Van Dien reprises his role as Johnny Rico from the first and third films and Dina Meyer reprises her role as Dizzy Flores from the first film.

== Plot ==
After the events of Invasion, Johnny Rico has been demoted to the rank of colonel and relocated to a space station orbiting Mars to train a new batch of troopers. Unfortunately, his squad is incompetent. Mars has low support for the war, seeing their planet unaffected by the bug conflict and even suggesting pulling out from the war. Because of their laid-back attitude, the denizens of Mars are unprepared for a full-scale bug invasion.

Unknown to everyone, Sky Marshal Amy Snapp plans to destroy Mars while gaining popular support for doing it, having been aware of a bug nest growing under Mars for some time but deciding to take advantage of the bug attack to gain social and political support to scuttle the whole planet. She stages a fleet attack run on the Arachnid Quarantine Zone (AQZ) as a massive distraction. While the public is distracted, she plans to capture General Carl Jenkins, then fabricate a story in which the Federation was too distracted in the AQZ to save Mars and had to detonate a Q-Bomb (a planet destroyer whose power was demonstrated in the third film) to cleanse the bug threat, thus blaming Jenkins for the loss of Mars.

During the bug attack, Rico and his team survive the initial assault and manage to land on the Mars surface. While the bulk of the Federation start their attack run on the AQZ, Snapp captures Jenkins and disrupts all communications between Earth and Mars. However, before he was captured, Jenkins telepathically reached out to Carmen Ibanez to return to Mars. Meanwhile, during a bug attack, Rico's troopers are found by a rescue drop ship and everyone makes it on board except for Rico, whom the team presumes dead. When regaining consciousness, Rico sees his dead lover, Dizzy Flores, who died in the first film, and who asks him to help stop the Q-Bomb. Unknown to Rico, Dizzy is a telepathic projection from Jenkins. While being beaten and drugged by Snapp, Jenkins manages to telepathically motivate Rico to help stop the Q-Bomb. Snapp then publicly announces the fall of Mars.

Rico's surviving troopers realize he is alive and return to save him. Upon reuniting, the team heads towards the weather control tower to disarm the Q-Bomb. They overload the tower's systems to improvise a massive explosive device to thin out the enemy forces. With the Fed-Net back online, public reception of Snapp turns negative. Carmen arrives with a drop ship and rescues Rico's surviving team. Once evacuated, the tower's destruction destroys the bugs within its blast radius.

In the aftermath, Jenkins breaks free from his captors and later returns to power. Rico is promoted back to the rank of general and leads the operation to reclaim Mars, while Snapp's treachery is revealed to the public.

== Cast ==
- Casper Van Dien as Colonel Juan "Johnny" Rico, a demoted general stationed on the frontier planet of Mars forced to train rather hopeless soldiers.
- Dina Meyer as Dizzy Flores, Rico's deceased lover who appears as a telepathic hallucination induced by Carl Jenkins to inspire him.
- Justin Doran as General Carl Jenkins, Minister of Paranormal Warfare and a former classmate of Rico's. Doran reprises his role from the previous film.
- Luci Christian as Captain Carmen Ibanez, of the John A. Warden and a former classmate of Rico's. Christian reprises her role from the previous film.
- Emily Neves as Sky Marshal Amy Snapp, an ambitious officer who wishes to destroy Mars for political and social support.
- Scott Gibbs as Lieutenant Toshi Baba
- DeRay Davis as Corporal "One-Oh-One", a trigger-happy explosives expert.
- Juliet Simmons as Tami Camacho, only female in the squad.
- Chris Gibson as Dutch Cantor, a red-haired jokester who was known for always being dismembered in simulations. KIA in the same way.
- Greg Ayres as Private Second Class Geo Malik. A quiet soldier with a penchant for science over combat, also known for his distinctive goggles.
- Leraldo Anzaldua as Sergeant Major Guy "Ratzass" Cunningham, now Rico's right-hand man after the events of Invasion. His rowdiness has settled down as his reputation grows throughout the Federation. As the first recurring character in the Starship Troopers series aside from Rico, Jenkins and Ibanez, he's KIA when jumping from a gunship, as his helmet air seal fails, freezing his body in freefall.
- John Swasey as George Baba, Lt. Baba's cousin and a pilot of Martian National Guard. KIA after his ship was damaged by a plasma bug, crashing directly into it, sacrificing himself.
- Ashley Forshaw as Bug Scream
- Andrew Love as Fed Net Official
- Kyle C. Jones as Daniel
- Rob Mungle as Special Branch Chief Torek
- Maggie Flecknoe as Sana, the Ticket Agent

== Production ==
Following Roughnecks: Starship Troopers Chronicles (1999) and Invasion (2012), Traitor of Mars is the third CG animated project in the film series' universe. Screenwriter Edward Neumeier (who wrote the first 3 films and directed Starship Troopers 3: Marauder) returned to write this entry.

Development and news of the animated film, made to coincide with the 20th Anniversary of the release of the first film, happened rather discreetly. News of the film emerged on June 5, 2017, when Sony Entertainment debuted a trailer online.

== Release ==
Fathom Events gave the film a one-night release on August 21, 2017. It released video on demand on August 22, 2017 and home media on September 1, 2017.

== Reception ==
On Rotten Tomatoes the film has four reviews: one positive and three negative.

== See also ==
- List of films set on Mars
