= Casper Van Dien =

American actor (born 1968)

- Van Dien at Dragon Con in 2026
- Born: Casper Robert Van Dien Jr. December 18, 1968 (age 57); Milton, Florida, U.S.
- Occupation: Actor
- Years active: 1984–present
- Spouses: Carrie Mitchum (m. 1993; div. 1997) Catherine Oxenberg (m. 1999; div. 2015) Jennifer Wenger (m. 2018)
- Children: 4, including Grace Van Dien

Casper Robert Van Dien Jr. (born December 18, 1968) is an American actor, best known for his lead role as Johnny Rico in the science-fiction action film Starship Troopers (1997). Other credits include Sleepy Hollow (1999), Sanctimony (2000), The Curse of King Tut's Tomb (2006), Watch Over Me (2006–2007), Born to Ride (2011), Shiver (2012), Mortal Kombat: Legacy (2013), Star Raiders: The Adventures of Saber Raine (2017), Alita: Battle Angel (2019), and Mad Heidi (2022).

== Early life ==
Van Dien was born in Milton, Florida, the son of Diane (née Morrow), a nursery school teacher, and Casper Robert Van Dien Sr., a U.S. Navy Commander and fighter pilot.

There is a long military tradition in Van Dien's family. Aside from his father, his grandfather was a Marine during World War II. Van Dien is descended from an old Dutch family long settled in the New York area; his other heritage includes Swedish, French, and English.

The street that he grew up on: Van Dien Avenue, Ridgewood, New Jersey, was named after his great-great-great-grandfather. When Van Dien was older, his family returned to Florida, where he enrolled at the St. Petersburg campus of the Admiral Farragut Academy, graduating 3rd in command. After high school, Van Dien attended Florida State University in Tallahassee, where he was a member of Sigma Alpha Epsilon fraternity.

== Career ==
After moving to Los Angeles, Van Dien landed a number of small parts in various television series and movies. Two early breaks were recurring roles as Ty Moody on the daytime soap opera One Life to Live and the prime time drama Beverly Hills, 90210. Keen to expand his acting talents, Van Dien took a big part in the video game, Wing Commander IV: The Price of Freedom.

In 1996, Van Dien played King Tal in Beastmaster III: The Eye of Braxus, the second sequel to the 1982 cult classic, The Beastmaster. Van Dien also starred in the 1997 James Dean biopic James Dean: Race with Destiny. Soon after, he got the breakthrough role of Johnny Rico in Paul Verhoeven's 1997 science fiction action film Starship Troopers. His success in Starship Troopers subsequently resulted in his casting as Tarzan in Tarzan and the Lost City (1998). Van Dien next played Brom von Brunt in Tim Burton's 1999 film Sleepy Hollow, a reworking of the classic Washington Irving tale.

In 2000, Van Dien appeared in Cutaway as well as Aaron Spelling's short-lived NBC prime time soap Titans with Yasmine Bleeth, John Barrowman, Perry King and Victoria Principal. He filmed several scenes as Patrick Bateman, in 2002's The Rules of Attraction. However, the scenes were unused in the final film.

In 2008, Van Dien returned to the role of Rico in Starship Troopers 3: Marauder, a direct-to-video sequel to Starship Troopers.

Van Dien replaced Matt Mullins as Johnny Cage for the second season of the YouTube webseries Mortal Kombat: Legacy.

In 2020, he joined the cast of the independent film Daughter. In 2022, Van Dien played the role of Samual Hyst in the series Salvage Marines, where he was also credited as a producer, an adaptation of the Necrospace book series; in an interview, he favorably compared this role to that of Johnny Rico.

== Personal life ==
From 1993 to 1997, Van Dien was married to Carrie Mitchum (daughter of Christopher Mitchum and granddaughter of Robert Mitchum). Van Dien had co-starred with Robert Mitchum in James Dean: Race with Destiny. They have two children, including actress Grace Van Dien (b. 1996).

In 1999, Van Dien met actress Catherine Oxenberg during the filming of the TV movie The Collectors, and they soon worked together again in the 1999 thriller The Omega Code. On May 8, 1999, they married at Graceland Wedding Chapel in Las Vegas, Nevada. In 2005, the couple appeared in their own reality series, I Married a Princess, which aired on the Lifetime Television channel in the United States, LIVINGtv in the United Kingdom and Lifestyle You in Australia; Oxenberg's mother is Princess Elizabeth of Yugoslavia. During the 2006–2007 TV season, Van Dien and Oxenberg co-starred in the American drama series Watch Over Me on MyNetworkTV. Oxenberg had a daughter from a previous relationship, India Riven Oxenberg (b. 1991). Van Dien and Oxenberg have two daughters, born 2001 and 2003. In 2015, Van Dien filed for divorce from Oxenberg. Van Dien and Oxenberg were celebrity ambassadors for the non-profit organization Childhelp.

Van Dien married Jennifer Wenger in June 2018.

== Filmography ==
=== Film ===
| Year | Title | Role | Notes |
|---|---|---|---|
| 1996 | Night Eyes 4: Fatal Passion | Roy | |
| 1996 | Beastmaster III: The Eye of Braxus | King Tal | |
| 1997 | Casper: A Spirited Beginning | Bystander | Direct-to-video |
| 1997 | Starship Troopers | Johnny Rico | |
| 1998 | Tarzan and the Lost City | Tarzan / John Clayton II | |
| 1998 | Casper Meets Wendy | Crewcut Hunk | Direct-to-video |
| 1999 | The Omega Code | Gillen Lane | |
| 1999 | Sleepy Hollow | Brom Van Brunt | |
| | Shark Attack | steve mckray | |
| 2000 | Sanctimony | Tom Gerrick | |
| 2000 | Road Rage | Jim Travis | |
| 2002 | The Rules of Attraction | Patrick Bateman | Deleted scene |
| 2004 | Dracula 3000 | Captain Abraham Van Helsing | Direct-to-video |
| 2006 | Slayer | hawk | |
| 2008 | Aces N Eights | Luke Rivers | |
| 2009 | One Hot Summer | Luther Simmonds | |
| 2008 | Starship Troopers 3: Marauder | Colonel Johnny Rico | Direct-to-video |
| 2011 | Born to Ride | Mike Callahan | |
| 2012 | Shiver | Sebastian Delgado | |
| 2012 | Malibu Days | | Short film |
| 2012 | The Pact | Bill Creek | |
| 2012 | Abraham Lincoln: Vampire Hunter Sequels | James K. Polk | Short film |
| 2012 | Noobz | Himself | Also co-producer |
| 2012 | Christmas Twister | Ethan | |
| 2012 | Starship Troopers: Invasion | —N/a | Direct-to-video, executive producer |
| 2013 | 500 MPH Storm | Nathan Sims | |
| 2013 | Assumed Killer | Sam Morrow | Also co-producer |
| 2013 | Higher Mission | John Perryman | |
| 2014 | Sleeping Beauty | King David | Direct-to-video, also director |
| 2015 | Avengers Grimm | Rumpelstiltskin | Direct-to-video |
| 2015 | June | Dave Anderson | Also co-executive producer |
| 2016 | Army Dog | Tom Holloway | Also producer |
| 2016 | Showdown in Manila | Charlie Benz | |
| 2016 | Storage Locker 181 | Dayton | |
| 2016 | Beyond the Edge | Harold Richards | original title Isra 88 |
| 2017 | Star Raiders: The Adventures of Saber Raine | Saber Raine | |
| 2017 | All About the Money | Kurt Pomeroy | Also producer |
| 2017 | Starship Troopers: Traitor of Mars | Colonel Johnny Rico (voice) | Direct-to-video, also executive producer |
| 2018 | Last Seen in Idaho | Brock | Also co-producer |
| 2018 | Darkness Reigns | Himself | |
| 2018 | Dead Water | John Livingston | |
| 2018 | Deadpool The Musical 2 - Ultimate Disney Parody | Cyclops | Short fan film |
| 2018 | Alpha Wolf | Jack Lupo | |
| 2019 | Alita: Battle Angel | Amok | |
| 2019 | Madness in the Method | Tim | |
| 2019 | Chokehold | Javier | |
| | Last Seen In Idaho | Brock | |
| 2020 | Acquitted by Faith | Benjamin Stills | |
| 2020 | The Warrant | Virgil St. Denis / The Saint | |
| 2020 | The Road to Camp Miracle | Ernest Robertson | Short film |
| 2020 | Roped | Robert Peterson | |
| 2020 | Lady Driver | Elliot Lansing | |
| 2020 | G-Loc | Decker | |
| 2020 | Dead Water | John | |
| 2020 | The 2nd | Melvin "The Driver" Sampras | |
| 2020 | One Nation Under God | Kingsley | |
| 2021 | Real Talk | Rick the Republican | |
| 2021 | Shooting Paul | Ben | |
| 2021 | Serena's Game | Ben | |
| 2022 | A Tale of Two Guns | Abel Cruz | |
| 2022 | Assailant | Michael | |
| 2022 | Mad Heidi | President Meili | |
| 2022 | The Most Dangerous Game | Baron Von Wolf | |
| 2022 | Battle of Saipan | Vic | |
| 2022 | County Line: No Fear | Zed Dalton | |
| 2023 | Daughter | Father | |
| 2023 | The Flood | | |
| 2023 | Monsters of California | Myers | |
| | Heart Of A Championship | Clint | |
| 2025 | The Last Time | Vasillias | |
| | Guns Of Redemption | Luke | |
| | Ruthless Bastards | Nico Hawk | |

=== Television ===
| Year | Title | Role | Notes |
|---|---|---|---|
| 1990 | Menu for Murder | Lifeguard | TV movie |
| 1991 | Saved by the Bell | Student | Uncredited; episode: "Pipe Dreams" |
| 1991 | Dangerous Women | Brad Morris | Recurring |
| 1992 | Freshman Dorm | Zack Taylor | 5 episodes |
| 1992 | Life Goes On | Unknown | Episode: "Udder Madness" |
| 1993–1994 | One Life to Live | Tyler "Ty" Moody | TV series |
| 1994 | Dr. Quinn, Medicine Woman | Jesse | Episode: "Cattle Drive: Part 1 & 2" |
| 1994 | Beverly Hills, 90210 | Griffin Stone | 7 episodes |
| 1995 | P. C. H. | Randy | TV movie |
| 1995 | Silk Stalkings | Roger Barrows | Episode: "I Know What Scares You" |
| 1995 | Married... with Children | Eric Waters | Episode: "Blonde and Blonder" |
| 1996 | Backroads to Vegas | Adam | TV movie |
| 1996 | Lethal Orbit | Tom Corbett | TV movie |
| 1996 | Beastmaster III: The Eye of Braxus | King Tal | TV movie |
| 1996 | The Colony | Sawyer | TV movie |
| 1997 | The Outer Limits | Jake Miller | Episode: "Heart's Desire" |
| 1997 | NightScream | Teddy Johnson / Ray Ordwell Jr. | TV movie |
| 1997 | James Dean: Race with Destiny | James Dean | TV movie |
| 1998 | Modern Vampires | Dallas | TV movie, also producer |
| 1998 | On the Border | Jake Barnes | TV movie |
| 1999 | Shark Attack | Steven McKray | TV movie |
| 1999 | The Collectors | A.K. | TV movie |
| 1999 | Thrill Seekers | Tom Merrick | TV movie |
| 2000 | Partners | Axel | TV movie |
| 2000 | Python | Bart Parker | TV movie |
| 2000 | Road Rage | Jim Travis | TV movie |
| 2000 | Cutaway | Delmira | TV movie |
| 2000–2001 | Titans | Chandler Williams | 14 episodes |
| 2001 | Chasing Destiny | Bobby Moritz | TV movie |
| 2001 | Under Heavy Fire | Captain Ramsey | TV movie |
| 2001 | The Tracker | Connor Spears | TV movie |
| 2001 | Danger Beneath the Sea | Miles Sheffield | TV movie |
| 2002 | The Vector File | Gerry | TV movie |
| 2003 | Big Spender | Eddie Burton | TV movie |
| 2003 | Windfall | "Ace" Logan | TV movie |
| 2004 | Skeleton Man | Oberron | TV movie |
| 2004 | Dracula 3000 | Abraham Van Helsing | TV movie |
| 2004 | What the Bleep Do We Know!? | Romantic Moritz | Documentary; uncredited |
| 2004 | Rock Me, Baby | Michael | Episode: "Love at First Flight" |
| 2005 | I Married a Princess | Himself | Also producer |
| 2005 | Hollywood Flies | Zach | TV movie |
| 2005 | Maiden Voyage | Kyle Considine | TV movie |
| 2005 | Personal Effects | Chris Locke | TV movie |
| 2005 | The Fallen Ones | Matt Fletcher | TV movie |
| 2005 | Officer Down | Philip Hallows | TV movie |
| 2005 | Premonition | Jack Barnes | TV movie |
| 2006 | Meltdown | Tom | TV movie |
| 2006 | The Curse of King Tut's Tomb | Danny Freemont | TV movie |
| 2006 | Slayer | "Hawk" | TV movie |
| 2006–2007 | Watch Over Me | Andre Forester | 64 episodes |
| 2008 | Aces 'N' Eights | Luke Rivers | TV movie |
| 2008 | Mask of the Ninja | Jack Barrett | TV movie |
| 2008–2009 | Monk | Steven Albright | 2 episodes |
| 2009 | One Hot Summer | Luther Simmonds | TV movie |
| 2010 | Turbulent Skies | Tom | TV movie |
| 2010 | Laugh Track Mash-ups | James | Episode: "Coopin' with Mr. Levy" |
| 2010 | The Dog Who Saved Christmas Vacation | Randy McGovern | TV movie |
| 2012 | Lake Effects | Ash Henson | TV movie |
| 2012 | Fugitive at 17 | Spencer Oliphant | TV movie |
| 2012 | Femme Fatales | Joe Hallenbeck | Episode: "One Man's Death" |
| 2012 | Baby's First Christmas | Kyle | TV movie |
| 2015 | Fire Twister | Scott | TV movie |
| 2015 | Sharktopus vs. Whalewolf | Ray | TV movie |
| 2015 | Patient Killer | Jason | TV movie; also director |
| 2017 | Hawaii Five-0 | Roger Niles | Episode: "Na La Ilio" |
| 2018–2023 | All American | Harold Adams | 11 episodes |
| 2022 | Salvage Marines | Samuel Hyst | |
| 2025 | Wednesday | Arnold Gideon | 2 episodes |
| TBA | Stripped | Chris Cameron | |

=== Web ===
| Year | Title | Role | Notes |
|---|---|---|---|
| 2013 | Mortal Kombat: Legacy | Johnny Cage | 5 episodes |
| 2015 | Interns of F.I.E.L.D. | Hawk Guy | 2 episodes |
| 2015–2016 | Con Man | Waiter (cameo) | 6 episodes |
| 2016 | Crunch Time | Casper Van Dien | 3 episodes |
| 2017 | Super Power Beat Down - Boba Fett vs Star-Lord | Hal Jordan / Green Lantern | Fan film |
| 2018 | Deadpool The Musical 2 - Ultimate Disney Parody! | Cyclops | |
| 2021 | Batman: Dying Is Easy | James Gordon | Fan film |

=== Video games ===
| Year | Title | Role | Notes |
|---|---|---|---|
| 1996 | Wing Commander IV: The Price of Freedom | Confed Redshirt #3 | |
| 2005 | Starship Troopers: The Video Game | General Johnny Rico (voice) | |
| 2024 | Starship Troopers: Extermination | General Johnny Rico (voice) | |
| 2026 | Starship Troopers: Ultimate Bug War! | General Johnny Rico | |
