= Starship Troopers: Terran Ascendancy =

2000 video game

- Developer: Blue Tongue Entertainment
- Publisher: Hasbro Interactive (Note: Released under the MicroProse label)
- Director: Nick Hagger
- Designer: Nick Hagger
- Programmer: Shane Stevens
- Artists: Lloyd Chidgzey, Glen Dunstan
- Writer: Nick Hagger
- Composer: Stephan Schütze
- Platform: Microsoft Windows
- Release: NA: October 23, 2000; AU: November 1, 2000; EU: November 10, 2000
- Genre: Real-time tactics
- Mode: Single-player

Starship Troopers: Terran Ascendancy, also known as simply Starship Troopers in the U.S., is a real-time tactics video game developed by Blue Tongue Entertainment and published by Hasbro Interactive under the MicroProse label in 2000. The game is based on both the 1997 movie Starship Troopers and the 1959 book Starship Troopers by Robert A. Heinlein.

== Gameplay ==
During gameplay, players begin by selecting a lieutenant profile and choosing a platoon insignia before entering missions. Each mission starts with a vocal and text briefing outlining objectives. The player must appoint a strike team for every mission and equip members with any required items, or may allow the game to auto‑select and auto‑equip the team. Once deployed, players control their troops in real time across large environments, using multiple weapons such as grenade launchers, light rifles, and missile launchers. Players can assign different formations to their units to handle various situations. The camera can be centered on troops with the spacebar, and manual adjustments allow the player to change viewing angles. Missions proceed as players move their squad through terrain, engage alien enemies, and complete assigned objectives within the campaign structure.

== Plot ==
The game is divided into three acts following the player's Mobile Infantry platoon from the start to the end of the war.

=== Act 1 ===
On October 18, 2369, the player's platoon is first deployed to Klendathu at the start of the war only for the mission to end with a general retreat. The player's platoon, however gets stranded during the evacuation and is forced to deal with Plasma bugs to facilitate extraction, while saving any allied MI squads in the area. Shortly after Klendathu, on November 23, 2369, the player's platoon is sent to Zegema Beach to extract a weapons supply convoy in the area. Shortly after Zegema Beach, the player's platoon is deployed to the Arachnid Quarantine Zone in Dentana to save the local civilians in the area, while capturing a live Arachnid specimen in the process on January 20, 2370. The last two missions for this act take place in Planet P on February 28 and March 1, 2370, where the player is deployed to secure Whiskey Outpost while capturing further bug specimens. The act ends with the player's platoon in a cave labeled "Bug City," where the player's platoon facilitates the capture of the Brain Bug.

=== Act 2 ===
Five months have passed since the capture of the Brain Bug, and Arachnid Egg Fall Clusters have been attacking various planets in Terran-controlled space. The player's platoon was tasked with escort missions for Internal Security's officer Major Alexander Bishop, while repelling an Arachnid invasion of Mars, attempting to recapture a colony called New Wellington from the Arachnids for morale purposes, as well as learning the true nature of how the Arachnids were able to efficiently attack the Terrans especially with a key food processing facility and the loss of two key military research bases. Bishop and the player's platoon is deployed to Axel 6, a small mining outpost with very little strategic value to exfiltrate the commanding officer of the base as a potential witness. Major Bishop and the player learn that a high-ranking Federation officer, Colonel Holland, has been leaking intelligence of the major Terran bases to the Arachnids via the captured Brain Bug, in hopes of uniting humanity with the bugs. Bishop and the player's platoon succeed in killing Holland and the captured Brain Bug while saving scientists who were witnesses to Holland's treachery. Despite the nature of Holland's behavior, the Terran Council decide to cover up Holland's death for morale purposes and finish the battle.

=== Act 3 ===
As of September 20, 2371, the Federation has managed to create new weapons and technology for use against the Arachnids and has begun a counter-offensive against the Arachnids to ensure the end of the war. The player's platoon was tasked with rescue missions for stranded Mobile Infantry troopers on Planet P, as well as students from a military academy used to train Psychics on the planet Sirius 3, and recovering ancient teleportation technology on Planet G. Shortly after the success of the mission, the player is sent to Klendathu for the second and last time to search for an Arachnid Queen. Utilizing psychic troopers to track the queen, as well as reverse-engineered teleportation devices for extraction, the player's platoon fights through arachnid forces to plant Nova bombs in the hive and manages to escape the cavern before it explodes. The war ends on New Year's Day of 2372, with the Terran military celebrating their victory.

== Reception ==
Reception

Aggregate score
Aggregator	Score
Metacritic	68/100

Review scores
Publication	Score
AllGame	3.5/5
CNET Gamecenter	7/10
Computer Games Strategy Plus	3.5/5
Computer Gaming World	2/5
Eurogamer	6/10
Game Informer	7.75/10
GamePro	3/5
GameSpot	5.4/10
GameSpy	78%
IGN	7.2/10
PC Gamer (US)	60%

The game received "average" reviews according to the review aggregation website Metacritic.
