= Who Are the Heirs of Patrick Henry? =

1958 essay by Robert Heinlein

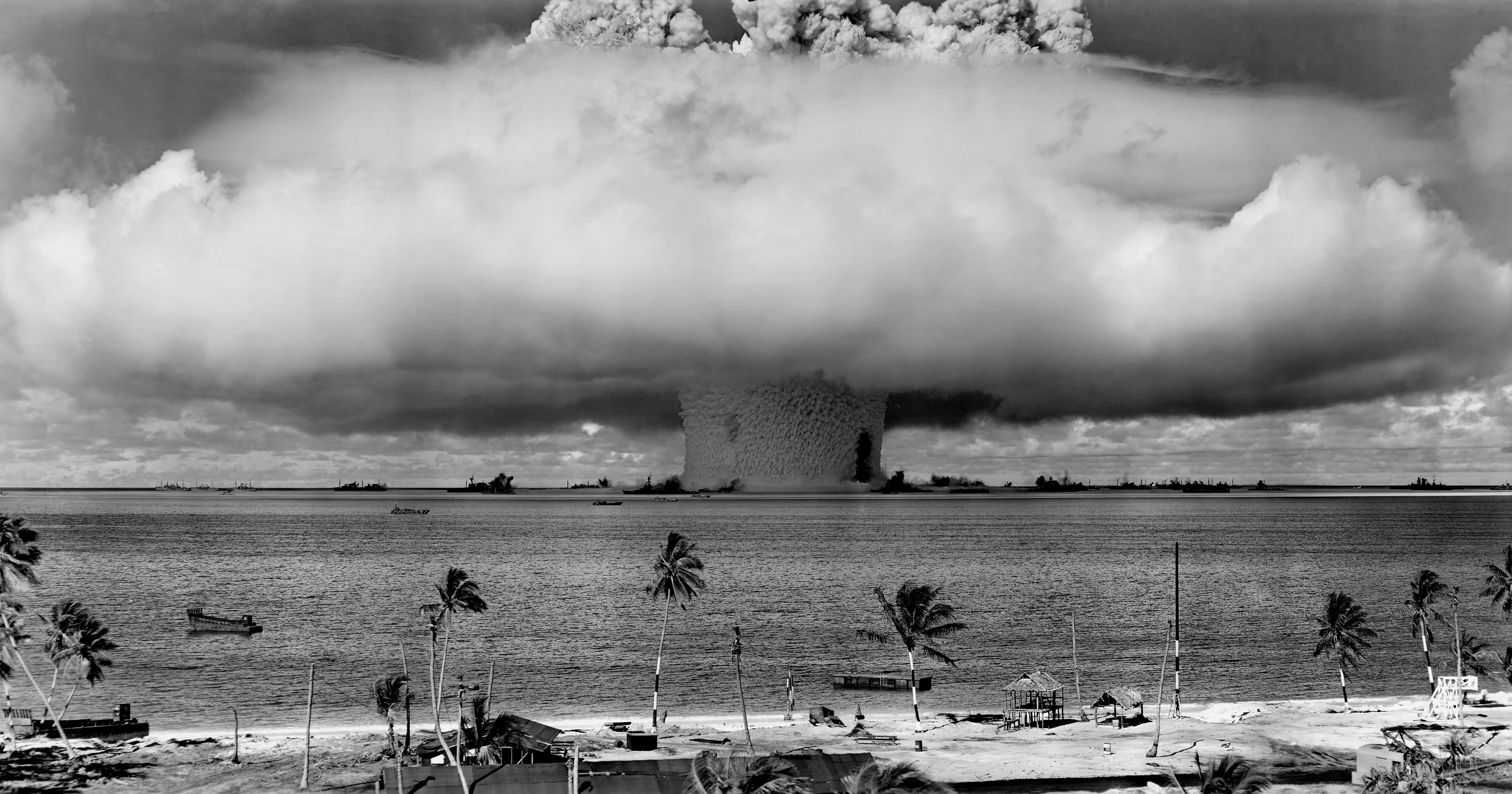
The U.S. nuclear test on Bikini Atoll in 1946

Who Are the Heirs of Patrick Henry? is an essay by author Robert Heinlein, defending continued above-ground nuclear testing by the United States. It was printed as a paid ad in 1958, in response to a similar ad by The National Committee for a SANE Nuclear Policy urging that the U.S. unilaterally end testing.

SANE was famously advocating a ban on nuclear testing by the United States, emphasizing the danger of exposure to fallout. This was supported by an estranged Heinlein friend, Isaac Asimov, who later said he was happy to have "played a very small part in bringing about the nuclear-test ban". He had written a paper detailing the effects of carbon-14 on human beings called The Radioactivity of the Human Body, the first popular media examination of the issue.

When SANE took out an ad to this effect in Heinlein's local newspaper, Colorado Springs Gazette Telegraph, Heinlein, within days, responded with his own ad. In it, he acknowledged that nuclear testing has some impact but not anything like the claims he described as "willfully distorted", but stated that even if the very slight impact was "a hundred times as great[,] we still would choose it to the dead certainty of Communist enslavement".

His article had started with a Patrick Henry quote:

Is life so dear, or peace so sweet, as to be purchased at the price of chains and slavery? Forbid it, Almighty God! I know not what course others may take, but as for me, give me liberty, or give me death!!

After stating that there was indeed a danger of death by nuclear war, Heinlein stated: "These are the risks. The alternative is surrender. We accept the risks."

Heinlein sent this article to many of his friends with a reaction that was, at best, mixed. Even among those who agreed with him, the author and editor John W. Campbell responded: "Your newspaper ads aren’t going to do much good, Bob, because the Common Man is in control... and he's quite incapable of understanding the complexities of the systems he's controlling."

Ultimately, a petition was sent to U.S. President Dwight Eisenhower from Heinlein's "Patrick Henry League" with 500 signatures, advocating continued nuclear testing. On October 31, 1958, the United States, the United Kingdom, and the Soviet Union entered into a three-year moratorium on nuclear weapon testing.

A side effect of the general incident was that Heinlein stopped working on his current book, with a working title of The Heretic, to write a novel in which he attempted to express his own principles of community service and sacrifice for the common good, Starship Soldiers. In it, characters learned the values of civic virtue and community service, while serving in a futuristic Mobile Infantry using power armor suits, often credited as helping invent the mecha genre of science fiction. This was serialized in The Magazine of Fantasy & Science Fiction. It was later published as a novel, Starship Troopers, in 1959.

In a later reprinting of The Heirs of Patrick Henry in Expanded Universe, Heinlein emphasized that he was demonstrating public service, not militarism, by stating: "In Starship Troopers, it is stated flatly and more than once that nineteen out of twenty veterans are not military veterans. Instead, 95% of voters are what we call today 'former members of federal civil service'."

The book that he had put off finishing, The Heretic, was completed and published in 1961 as Stranger in a Strange Land, exploring a philosophical flip side and becoming seen as a sort of founding document of the hippie movement.
