= Starship Troopers (OVA) =

1988 anime original video by Sunrise

- Cover of official handbook on the series showing Johnny Rico inside the power armor design from the OVA.

宇宙の戦士 (Uchū no Senshi)
- Genre: Mecha, military science fiction
- Created by: Based on Starship Troopers; 1959 novel by Robert A. Heinlein
- Original video animation
- Directed by: Tetsurō Amino
- Produced by: Hironori Nakagawa; Minoru Takanashi
- Written by: Tsunehisa Ito; Shō Aikawa
- Music by: Hiroyuki Namba
- Studio: Sunrise
- Released: October 25, 1988 – December 17, 1988
- Runtime: 25 minutes
- Episodes: 6

Starship Troopers (宇宙の戦士, Uchū no Senshi; lit. "Warriors of Space") is a Japanese six-part anime OVA produced by Sunrise and Bandai, and released in 1988. It is based on the 1959 book Starship Troopers by Robert A. Heinlein. The OVA was dedicated to Heinlein, who died before the first part of the series was released.

== Plot ==
Johnny Rico, an ordinary high school student, decides to enlist in the military after learning that his classmate Carmencita plans to join upon graduation. Encouraged by his best friend Carl, who reveals that the Earth Federation is at war with an unidentified alien species, Rico commits to enlist despite his parents' objections.

During basic training, Rico experiences the harsh realities of military life, including the dismissal of fellow recruits, punishment for disobeying orders even when attempting to save allies, and the death of his mother. While serving as a platoon leader in simulated exercises, he is unexpectedly thrust into real combat with alien forces. Though many of his comrades are killed, Rico survives and is officially recognised as a soldier.

Rico later reunites with Carmencita, but differences between the military and civilian populations, as well as friction between the army and navy, create tension. When Carmencita's ship collides with an alien vessel and is destroyed, she is presumed dead. Rico subsequently participates in an assault on the alien homeworld, Kurendatsu, where he confronts both the loss of his friends and the realisation that the enemy also fights for survival.

Following a prolonged battle, Rico discovers that Carmencita has survived and is recovering in a military hospital. The story concludes with Rico finally confessing his long-suppressed feelings for her.

== Cast ==
- Juan "Johnny" Rico: Yasunori Matsumoto
- Carmencita Ibañez: Rei Sakuma
- Emilio Rico: Shinji Ogawa
- Maria Rico: Kazuko Yanaga
- Sergeant Zim: Akira Kamiya
- Greg Patterson: Hirotaka Suzuoki
- Alphard "Kitten" Smith: Kazuhiko Inoue
- Thomas Azuma: Shūichi Ikeda
- Pat Leivy: Show Hayami
- Carl McGuinness: Yūji Mitsuya
- Theodore C. Hendrick: Kazuyuki Sogabe
- Corporal Claire: Saeko Shimazu
- Sergeant Dunn: Shingo Hiromori
- Captain Frankel: Tomomichi Nishimura
- Captain Deladrier: Mika Doi
- Sergei Cherenkov: Masahiro Anzai

== Mecha design ==
Kazutaka Miyatake of Studio Nue originally designed the mobile infantry powered armors in the OVA for a Japanese edition of the novel (published by Hayakawa Publishing, Japan's largest science fiction publisher) in the early eighties. A mecha based on this design also appears on the DAICON III and IV Opening Animations from 1981 and 1983, a few years before the OVA was released.

== Episode list ==
1. "Johnny"
2. "Hendrick"
3. "Maria"
4. "Greg"
5. "Cherenkov"
6. "Carmencita"
