= Antonio Summerton =

South African actor and TV presenter

- Born: Antonio Summerton; 27 August 1980; South Africa
- Died: 29 December 2007 (aged 27); Roodepoort, South Africa
- Education: University of Stellenbosch
- Occupations: Actor, TV presenter
- Years active: 1999–2007

Antonio Summerton (27 August 1980 – 29 December 2007) was a South African actor and television presenter. He was best known for his roles in the popular serials Egoli: Place of Gold and 7de Laan.

== Personal life ==
He was born on 27 August 1980 in South Africa.

== Death ==
On 29 December 2007, at the age of 27, he lost control while riding his motorcycle in Roodepoort and hit a light pole. He died at the scene.

== Career ==
He polished his acting credits after joined with New Africa Theatre Association. Later he studied drama at the University of Stellenbosch. His first popular role came through the serial Backstage from 2000 to 2002. Then in 2004, he played the role 'Duncan' in the kykNET series Villa Rosa. In the same year, he made a guest role as 'Rick' in the popular soapie 7de Laan. He also appeared in the international films Human Cargo and Red Dust. Then he joined the films Lullaby and Starship Troopers. From 2006 to 2007, he was a regular on the soap opera Binnelanders, where he played the role of 'Brendan George'.

Apart from acting, he is also a television presenter, who hosted the show Selekta on DStv's Go channel. In August 2007 he worked as the host of the reality stripping show Stripteaze, which premiered on 1 September 2007 and aired on actionX channel. His final acting role came through the mini-series Noah's Ark, which aired from July to August 2008 where he played the title role.

== Selected filmography ==
- 7de Laan – Season 1 as Rick
- Backstage – Season 1 as Jason
- Noah's Ark – Season 1 as Noah Crawford
- Human Cargo as Rebel Leader
- Starship Troopers 3: Marauder as Sgt. M. Hightower
- Binnelanders as Brendan George
