= Starship Troopers (video game) =

2005 video game

- European Windows cover art of the retail box of the game
- Developer: Strangelite
- Publishers: EU: Empire Interactive; NA: Destineer
- Composer: Richard Jacques
- Platform: Microsoft Windows
- Release: AU: October 27, 2005; EU: October 28, 2005; NA: November 15, 2005
- Genre: First-person shooter
- Modes: Single-player, multiplayer

Starship Troopers is a 2005 first-person shooter game developed by British company Strangelite Studios and published by Empire Interactive. The game is based on the 1997 movie of the same name directed by Paul Verhoeven.

Set five years after the events of the movie, the game lets players assume the role of 'Marauder Zero Six' as they assault the planet Hesperus which has been invaded by the Arachnids. The game features footage from the first movie and the sequel Starship Troopers 2: Hero of the Federation (2004).

== Gameplay ==
=== Single-player ===
The single-player game features a campaign mode consisting of a series of missions connected by mission briefings. After a level is completed it is then available to play in a Level Attack mode, which is similar to a time trial mode, except a score and the number of kills are also recorded.

There are three different levels of difficulty: easy, medium, and hard. The level of difficulty affects the AI of the bugs, which means they will notice and attack players sooner on hard than on easy. The different levels also affect the amount of ammunition and grenades available throughout the missions, and the health of the bosses.

Most missions involve a player completing a single objective, with obstacles on the way. For example, the player's ultimate objective is to rescue comrades. The player may have to find the soldiers, protect them, retrieve supplies, fix equipment, and then escape.

During the course of a mission, a player may run into one or more bosses, often a Royal warrior or a bug that performs a heavy support role, such as a plasma bug or a tanker. As the game progresses, and tougher enemies are introduced, better guns are made available to the player.

=== Multiplayer ===
Multiplayer in Starship Troopers consists of three different modes; Deathmatch, Team Deathmatch and Co-op. The most popular mode is Co-op, which sees players defending a mechanic from an onslaught of arachnids whilst retrieving parts to repair a dropship to escape in. The network and lobby functions were provided by Demonware, who have now withdrawn the services.

Promised dedicated server and modification tools were never released, along with the closing of the official English forums player numbers in the multiplayer game were very low. The game also lacked any console or server commands which makes it impossible to execute a variety of necessary admin functions such as kick, ban or a map change. Lastly as the balancing of the weapons is directly inherited from the single-player mode this means that deathmatch play is not very competitive. A player who picks up the rocket launcher for example is likely to dominate the game because it deals significantly more damage compared to many other weapons, has an area of effect, can be fired rapidly and has a very large magazine.

Patches released for the game mainly focused upon improving the game's multiplayer mode. The latest, version 5.24 released in December 2005, introduced four new DM/TDM maps and three new co-op maps.

== Reception ==
Reception

Aggregate score
Aggregator	Score
Metacritic	46/100

Review scores
Publication	Score
1Up.com	D+
Computer Games Magazine	1/5
Computer Gaming World	1/5
Eurogamer	4/10
GameSpot	3.8/10
GameSpy	2/5
GameZone	6.7/10
IGN	5/10
PC Format	69%
PC Gamer (US)	45%

The game received "generally unfavorable reviews" according to the review aggregation website Metacritic. GameSpot and IGN stated technical issues, such as problems with the AI and archaic graphics as the reason for the low score. There are also very few character models, leaving most troopers looking identical. The sound bytes used for the troopers' voices are also repeated many times throughout the game, with some bytes placed at inappropriate times.
