= Starship Troopers: The Miniatures Game =

Starship Troopers:
The Miniatures Game
- Publishers: Mongoose
- Publication: 2005; 21 years ago
- Players: 2
- Age range: 12 +

Starship Troopers: The Miniatures Game was a short-lived miniature wargame released in 2005 by UK gaming company Mongoose Publishing. It drew upon Robert A. Heinlein's 1959 Starship Troopers novel, the films, and the TV series as inspiration through a license from Sony. The game was pulled from the shelves in 2007, and formally discontinued a year later.

== Armies ==
The playable races of Starship Troopers include the United Citizens Federation (UCF), the Arachnid Empire ("The Bugs") and the Skinnie Hegemony (or just "Skinnies"). Each of these races, besides the Arachnids, is further divided into different playable armies:

Mobile Infantry commanders, for example, can choose from a wide variety of different platoons. These include Light Armoured Mobile Infantry (as seen in the film adaptation), Marauders (large bipedal vehicles), Power Armour platoons (as seen in the Roughnecks cartoon), Pathfinders (elite commandos loosely based on the PC game) and Exosuits (based on the original 1959 book by Robert A. Heinlein).

Skinnies are based on a tribal society, and so the abilities and choices available to a Skinnie army depend greatly on the choice of tribe leader. Arachnid armies are extremely versatile; all Arachnid units are usable and are limited only by the hive's ability to breed them. In this way, the player develops their own personalised colony.

== Miniatures ==
Mongoose produced a large line of 28mm plastic and pewter miniatures for the Starship Troopers miniatures game by sculptors including Shayne Hoyle, Bobby Jackson, Bob Naismith, Ben Saunders and Steve Saunders amongst others.

== Reception ==
Starship Troopers was received favorably at Origins, where it won "Best New Game".

In 2007, Mongoose announced that it would update the rule system and convert the miniatures to a new line of pre-painted figures. The Starship Troopers line was discontinued in anticipation of its re-release as Starship Troopers: War of the Species. In early 2008, Mongoose Publishing changed their plans, saying that the new edition of Starship Troopers would use the Battlefield:Evolution game rules under the title Starship Troopers Evolution.

In March 2008 Mongoose announced that it was ceasing production and marketing of its miniatures ranges, ending Mongoose's involvement with Starship Troopers.

== Reviews ==
- Syfy
