= Starship Troopers 3: Marauder =

2008 film by Edward Neumeier

- Official DVD cover
- Directed by: Edward Neumeier
- Written by: Edward Neumeier
- Based on: Starship Troopers by Robert A. Heinlein
- Produced by: David Lancaster
- Starring: Casper Van Dien; Jolene Blalock; Amanda Donohoe; Marnette Patterson; Boris Kodjoe; Stephen Hogan
- Cinematography: Lorenzo Senatore
- Edited by: Michael Bateman
- Music by: Klaus Badelt
- Production companies: Stage 6 Films; Bold Films
- Distributed by: Sony Pictures Home Entertainment
- Release dates: July 19, 2008 (Japan); August 5, 2008 (United States)
- Running time: 105 minutes
- Countries: United States; South Africa; Germany
- Language: English
- Budget: $20 million

Starship Troopers 3: Marauder is a 2008 American military science fiction film written and directed by Edward Neumeier and starring Casper Van Dien, who returned as Johnny Rico from the original film, along with Jolene Blalock and Boris Kodjoe. It is a sequel to Starship Troopers (1997) and Starship Troopers 2: Hero of the Federation (2004) (which were both written by Neumeier), and is the third installment in the Starship Troopers franchise. Released in Japan on July 19, 2008, and directly to video in the United States on August 5, 2008 by Sony Pictures Home Entertainment, it received generally mixed reviews.

== Plot ==
In the eleven years of "The Second Bug War", the Mobile Infantry has improved their weapons and tactics. However, the Arachnids have countered these developments with new and tougher variants. The United Citizen Federation, now finding itself engaged in prolonged trench warfare on the frontier planets, increasingly relies on its control of the media, using its extensive police and judicial powers to suppress dissenters and religious fanatics as seditionists, while maintaining recruitment numbers.

Colonel Johnny Rico is stationed on the agricultural planet Roku San, where popular Sky Marshal and singer Omar Anoke pays a visit. While off-duty, Rico's old friend, General Dix Hauser, gets into a bar fight with a group of anti-war farmers. When Rico forcibly disarms the drunken Dix, he is threatened with a court martial but the base defenses suddenly fail due to a Bug attack. Rico incapacitates Dix and assumes command of the defenders. When Roku San falls, the media blames Rico, who is condemned to execution for insubordination.

Fleet Captain Lola Beck, Dix's fiancée and a former flame of Rico's, is piloting Anoke to Sanctuary, the Fleet's secret headquarters, when a mechanical failure due to a battery attack by the Bugs during warp severely damages her ship, forcing six crew members, including herself and Anoke, to escape via a rescue pod to the nearest planet, the classified OM-1. Admiral Enolo Phid suppresses the distress signal from the pod so as not to lower public morale, but Dix learns of the situation and has Rico's execution faked so he can rescue Anoke and Lola, since their capture would provide the Arachnids with invaluable knowledge, including the location of Sanctuary. On OM-1, an apparent earthquake causes one of the six survivors, a physician surnamed Wiggs, to fall into a crevasse, where Anoke sees a giant eye staring at him from below. Cynical cook Jingo Ryan perishes next after hiding within a cluster of supposed rock outcroppings, which are actually Arachnid limbs that pull him below ground. Engineer Bull Brittles proposes marriage to the very religious flight attendant, Holly Little, but dies shortly afterwards.

Back on Earth, Dix confronts Phid about why she is abandoning the Sky Marshal, only to be arrested. Phid reveals that Anoke caused the downfall of Roku San, having telepathically communicated with the "Brain of Brains", also known as "Behemecoytal", through a previously captured Brain Bug. Disillusioned with the war and seeking peace at any cost, he adopted the Arachnids’ religion and sacrificed the outpost at Roku San by disabling the surrounding electric barrier to win their trust. Now believing the original Brain Bug allowed itself to be captured in order to pass on intelligence from inside, the Federation orders it to be executed and dissected, but it resists by using its telepathic powers to murder several soldiers before Hauser slaughters it. Phid confesses to deliberately ignoring the distress calls from OM-1 to gain promotion to Sky Marshal, unaware that the highly skilled Lola was accompanying Anoke.

On OM-1, the stranded contact Behemecoytal, who communicates with them through the corpses of their fallen comrades and soon consumes Anoke's brain. Lola and Holly, the sole survivors, pray for salvation, which arrives when Rico and his command staff from Roku San, outfitted with cybernetically networked "Marauder" power armor suits, rescue them and defeat the Arachnid warriors without suffering any casualties. OM-1 is revealed as the home of the Bug Hive, the Arachnids' ruling body, and Fleet subsequently destroys it from orbit with a "Q Bomb".

Rico is subsequently cleared of all charges, promoted to the rank of General, and given command of the Marauder program. Anoke is reported to have died in a terrorist attack, staged earlier by Phid and the government to explain his disappearance, and given a hero's funeral. Dix and Lola are married, while Phid is appointed the new Sky Marshal with Dix as her second-in command, and Holly becomes the first Federal chaplain. Dozens of peace protesters are falsely convicted of involvement in the "terrorist attack" and executed by hanging. Phid, impressed by how Anoke was rendered servile by the Arachnids' religion, persuades the Federation to adopt a heavily modified version of Christianity as a state religion, promoting militarism and blind obedience.

== Cast ==
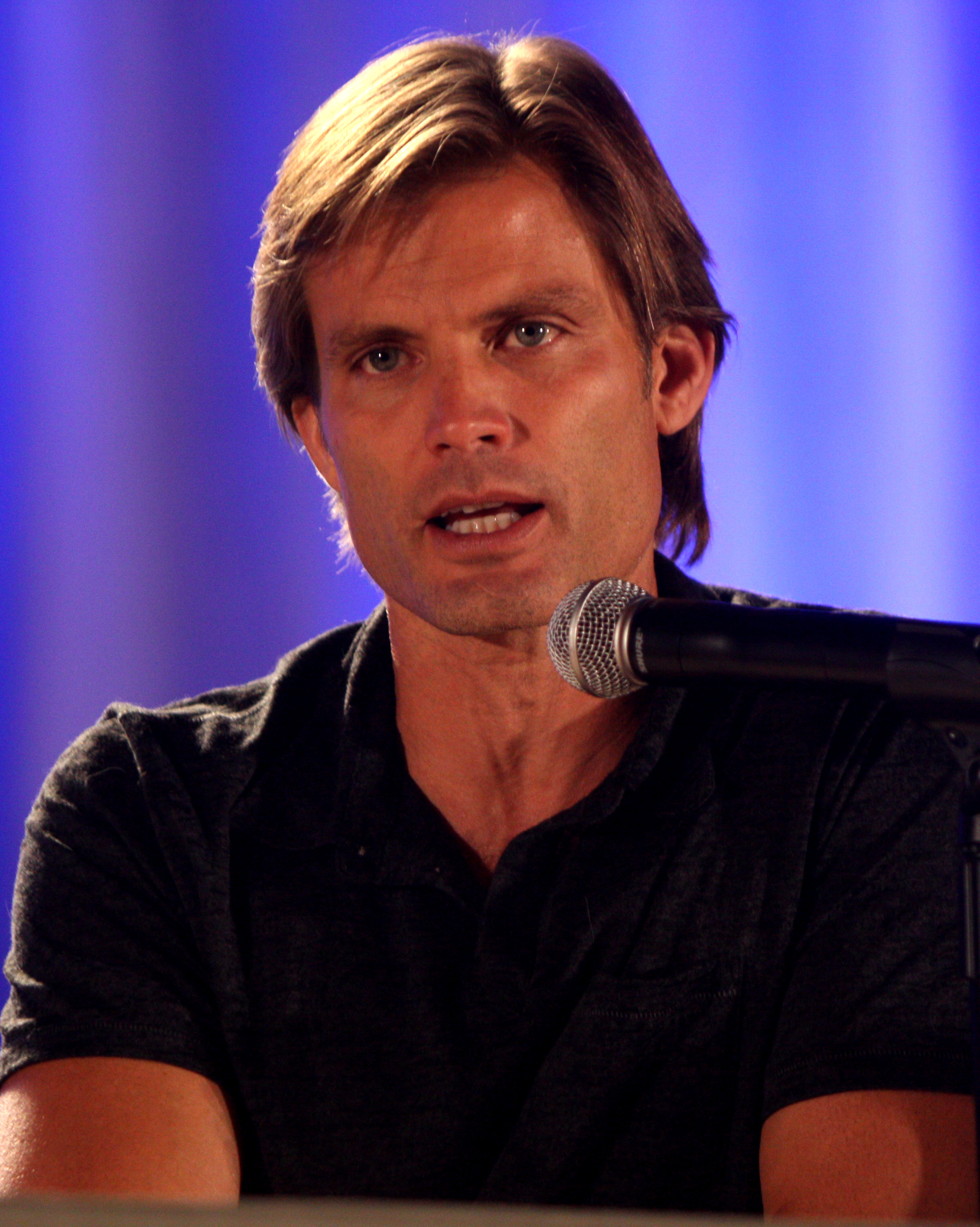
Casper Van Dien returns as Johnny Rico

- Casper Van Dien as Colonel Johnny Rico
- Jolene Blalock as Captain Lola Beck
- Boris Kodjoe as General Dix Hauser
- Stephen Hogan as Sky Marshal Omar Anoke
- Marnette Patterson as Holly Little
- Stelio Savante as Bull Brittles
- Cécile Breccia as Lieutenant Link Manion
- Cokey Falkow as Jingo Ryan
- Antonio Summerton as Sgt. M. Hightower
- Danny Keogh as Dr. Wiggs
- Amanda Donohoe as Admiral Enolo Phid
- Ashley Forshaw as Bug Scream
- Tanya van Graan as Sergeant A. Sunday
- Nicole Salandra as Sergeant J. Kirby
- Corey Burton as Fed Net (credited as Official) (voice)
- Joe Vaz as Elmo Gonif

== Production ==
Ed Neumeier, who wrote the screenplays of the previous two Starship Troopers films, makes his directorial debut with this film. Neumeier says that he sees the Troopers films as each reflecting different wars, and where the first film is inspired by movies about World War II, Marauders was inspired by Vietnam War films. The story also deals with issues of religion and politics, and is about "how the state can use religion both badly, and for good."

Casper Van Dien reprised his role as Johnny Rico for the third film, being the only actor from any of the previous movies to do so. He had been willing to reprise his character for the second film, but said director Phil Tippett wanted to go in a different direction that did not involve Rico and thus he could not participate.

Production started in May 2007, with principal photography commencing in South Africa.

Robert Skotak served as Visual Effects Supervisor, and Roger Nall was the Digital Effects Supervisor responsible for the CGI creature design and the Marauder battle armor sequences. Nall led a team of about twenty-five people. Their team worked on over 350 effects shots for the Arachnids alone, and the Marauder sequence, which included scenes of Van Dien and other actors stripping naked to be "bioscanned", required about 100 distinct shots. Third-party studies were brought in to work on sequences such as space ships, puppet work, wire removal and more, for an estimated 150 additional effects shots.

== Reception ==
=== Critical response ===
On Rotten Tomatoes, the film has an approval rating of 43% based on 7 reviews.

Joe Leydon of Variety said: "Die-hard fans of Starship Troopers, Paul Verhoeven's notorious 1997 cult-fave sci-fi spectacle, will be pleased to note that its second made-for-vid sequel gamely attempts to replicate the original pic's over-the-top style and self-satirical tone. Unlike 2004's negligible Starship Troopers 2: Hero of the Federation, a relatively straightforward actioner, the latest episode reprises Verhoeven's love-it-or-hate-it mix of gruesome mayhem, overstated melodrama, peek-a-boo nudity and tongue-in-cheek fascist aesthetics." Alex Dorn of UGO.com stated that "fans of the original movie should be pretty happy with this venture" but that those "expecting the whiz-bang big budget wonder of the original will be disappointed." He gave the film an overall rating of a B minus. Scott Weinberg of FEARnet gave the film a positive review, stating that the film is "probably a rental more so than a must-own, but certainly worth a look if you dug the first film". Ain't It Cool News gave the film a mixed review, saying the effects were a step down from the work of Phil Tippett in the second film, but welcomed the return to the satirical tone of the first film. The reviewer found the satire uneven, too specific at times, but also at other times unclear. He notes the problems and limitations of direct-to-video productions but concludes "if you can get past that and you enjoy this world then there is goofy fun to be had."

Lowe at IGN gave the film three out of ten and although he was impressed by the production values, he was not impressed by the film: "The bottom line is that Starship Troopers 3 is a film that even Starship Troopers fans will have trouble enjoying. Even the return of Casper Van Dien and added studio interest and budget could not salvage this film from the perils of its own shortcomings." David Nusair of ReelFilm found it less effective than the second film and called it "a misfire of near epic proportions".

=== Accolades ===
In March 2009, Starship Troopers 3: Marauder was nominated for a 2009 Saturn Award in the Best DVD Release Category.

== Home media ==
The film was released both Blu-ray and DVD on August 5, 2008. It is also part of Starship Troopers Trilogy DVD set, which contains the first three films in the series. Stephen Hogan's rendition of the theme song "A Good Day to Die" as Sky Marshall Omar Anoke is a bonus feature in the Blu-ray release. Film critic Joe Leydon wrote for Variety: "Omar Anoke, the heroic sky marshal in charge of battling the big bugs, is a charismatic celebrity and chart-topping singer whose onstage movements and militaristic song list suggest Adolf Hitler as an American Idol contestant." Scott Lowe of IGN wrote: "the Sky Marshal's saber rattling pop single ... calls to mind Lee Greenwood's 'I'm Proud to Be an American,'" despite also commenting it's "the most ridiculous and time wasting feature."

Home media sales totaled $4,989,719.

== Animated sequels ==
It is followed by two animated films, Starship Troopers: Invasion (2012) and Starship Troopers: Traitor of Mars (2017).

== See also ==
- List of films featuring powered exoskeletons
