= Starship Troopers =

1959 novel by Robert A. Heinlein

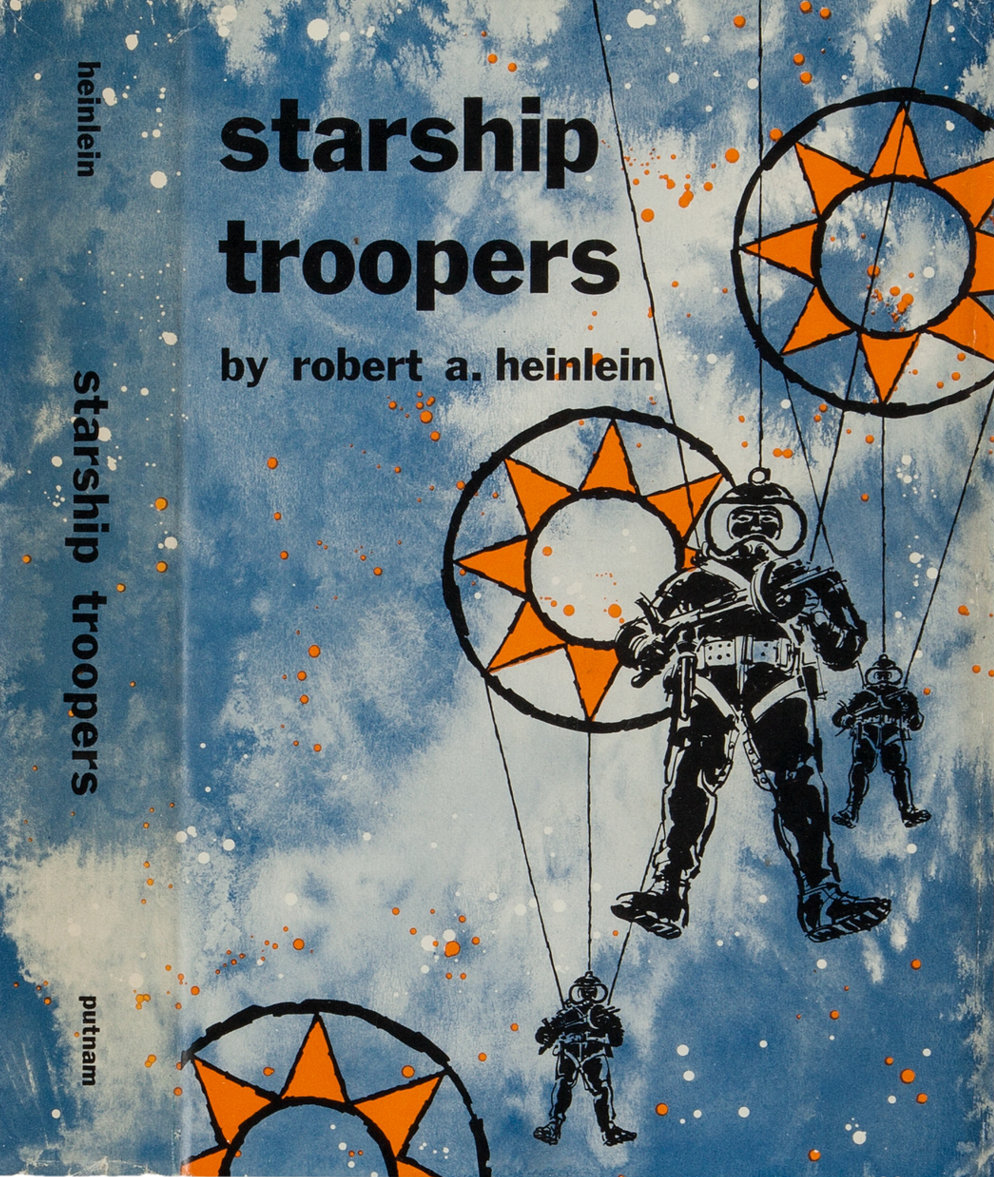
- First edition hardcover
- Author: Robert A. Heinlein
- Cover artist: Jerry Robinson
- Language: English
- Genre: Military science fiction Philosophical fiction
- Publisher: G. P. Putnam's Sons
- Publication date: November 5, 1959
- Publication place: United States
- Media type: Print (hardcover and paperback)
- Pages: 263 (paperback edition)
- Award: Hugo Award for Best Novel (1960)
- ISBN: 978-0450044496
- OCLC: 2797649
- LC Class: PZ7.H368 Su

Starship Troopers is a military science fiction novel by American writer Robert A. Heinlein. Written in a few weeks in reaction to the US suspending nuclear tests, the story was first published as a two-part serial in The Magazine of Fantasy & Science Fiction as Starship Soldier, and published as a book by G. P. Putnam's Sons on November 5, 1959.

The story is set in a future where humanity is united under an interstellar government called the Terran Federation, dominated by a military elite. Under the Terran Federation, only veterans of "Federal Service" enjoy full citizenship, including the right to vote. The first-person narrative follows Juan "Johnny" Rico, a young man of Filipino descent, through his military service in the Mobile Infantry. He progresses from recruit to officer against the backdrop of an interstellar war between humans and an alien species known as "Arachnids" or "Bugs". Interspersed with the primary plot are classroom scenes in which Rico and others discuss philosophical and moral issues, including aspects of suffrage, civic virtue, juvenile delinquency, and war; these discussions have been described as expounding Heinlein's own political views. Identified with a tradition of militarism in American science fiction, the novel draws parallels between the conflict between humans and the Bugs, and the Cold War. It is also a coming-of-age novel, which criticizes American cultural shifts of the 1950s, arguing that a lack of discipline had led to a moral decline, and advocating for corporal and capital punishment.

Starship Troopers brought to an end Heinlein's series of juvenile novels. It won the Hugo Award for Best Novel in 1960, and was praised by reviewers for its scenes of training and combat and its visualization of a future military. It also became enormously controversial because of the political views it seemed to support. Reviewers were strongly critical of the book's intentional glorification of the military, an aspect described as propaganda and likened to recruitment. The novel's militarism, and the fact that government service – most often military service – was a prerequisite to the right to vote, led to it being frequently described as fascist. Others disagree, arguing that Heinlein was only exploring the idea of limiting the right to vote to a certain group of people. Heinlein's depiction of gender has also been questioned, while reviewers have said that the terms used to describe the aliens were akin to racial epithets.

Starship Troopers had wide influence both within and outside science fiction. Ken MacLeod stated that "the political strand in [science fiction] can be described as a dialogue with Heinlein". Science fiction critic Darko Suvin wrote that it is the "ancestral text of US science fiction militarism" and that it shaped the debate about the role of the military in society for many years. The novel is credited with popularizing the idea of powered armor, which became a recurring feature in science fiction books and films, as well as an object of scientific research. Heinlein's depiction of a futuristic military was also influential. Later science fiction books, such as Joe Haldeman's 1974 anti-war novel The Forever War, have been described as reactions to Starship Troopers. The story was adapted several times, including in a 1997 film version directed by Paul Verhoeven that satirized what the director saw as the fascist aspects of the novel.

== Writing and publication ==
The cover of The Magazine of Fantasy & Science Fiction (November 1959), illustrating Starship Soldier

Robert Heinlein was among the best-selling science fiction authors of the 1940s and 1950s, along with Isaac Asimov and Arthur C. Clarke; they were known as the "big three" that dominated US science fiction. In contrast to the others, Heinlein firmly endorsed the anti-communist sentiment of the Cold War era in his writing. Heinlein served in the US Navy for five years after graduating from the United States Naval Academy in 1929. His experience in the military profoundly influenced his fiction. At some point between 1958 and 1959, Heinlein put aside the novel that would become Stranger in a Strange Land and wrote Starship Troopers. His motivation arose partially from his anger at US President Dwight Eisenhower's decision to suspend US nuclear tests, and the Soviet tests that occurred soon afterward. Writing in his 1980 volume Expanded Universe, Heinlein would say that the publication of a newspaper advertisement placed by the National Committee for a Sane Nuclear Policy on April 5, 1958, calling for a unilateral suspension of nuclear weapons testing by the United States sparked his desire to write Starship Troopers. Heinlein and his wife Virginia created the "Patrick Henry League" in an attempt to create support for the US nuclear testing program. Heinlein stated that he used the novel to clarify his military and political views.

Like many of Heinlein's books, Starship Troopers was completed in a few weeks. It was originally written as a juvenile novel for New York publishing house Scribner; Heinlein had previously had success with this format, having written several such novels published by that publisher. The manuscript was rejected, prompting Heinlein to end his association with that publisher completely, and to resume writing books with adult themes. Scholars have suggested that Scribner's rejection was based on ideological objections to the content of the novel, particularly in its treatment of military conflict.

The Magazine of Fantasy & Science Fiction first published Starship Troopers in October and November 1959 as a two-part serial titled Starship Soldier. A senior editor at Putnam's, Peter Israel, purchased the manuscript and approved revisions that made it more marketable to adults. Asked whether it was aimed at children or adults, he said at a sales conference "Let's let the readers decide who likes it." The novel was eventually published by G. P. Putnam's Sons.

== Setting ==
Set approximately 700 years in the future, the book depicts an Earth ruled by a world government run by military veterans. The society is depicted as affluent, and futuristic technology shown as coexisting with educational methods from the 20th century. The rights of a full citizen—to vote and hold public office—are not universally guaranteed, and can only be earned through Federal Service. Those who do not perform this service (of which only military service has been described) retain the rights of free speech and assembly, but can neither vote nor hold public office. People of either sex above the age of 18 are permitted to enlist; only those who complete their service gain full citizenship. Important government jobs are reserved for Federal Service veterans. This structure arose ad hoc after the collapse of the "20th century Western democracies", driven in part by an inability to control crime and juvenile delinquency, particularly in North America, and a war between an alliance of the United States, the United Kingdom and Russia, against the "Chinese Hegemony".

Two extraterrestrial civilizations are depicted, respectively, as the "Pseudo-Arachnids" (or "Bugs"), and the "Skinnies". The "Bugs" are described as communal beings originating from the planet of Klendathu, and consist of multiple castes; workers, warriors, brains, and queens, similar to those of ants and termites on Earth. The warriors are the only ones who fight, and are unable to surrender in battle. It also is implied that the Bugs are technologically advanced, possessing such technologies as spaceships. The "Skinnies" are depicted as less communal than the Arachnids, yet more so than humans. The events of the novel take place during an interstellar war between the Terran Federation and the Arachnids. At the opening of the story, Earth is not at war, yet such a declaration has come when Rico has completed his training. The "Skinnies" are initially allies of the Pseudo-Arachnids, but switch to alliance with humans, midway through the novel. Faster-than-light travel exists in this future: spacecraft use the "Cherenkov drive", and can travel "Sol to Capella, forty-six lightyears, in under six weeks".

Starship Troopers is narrated by the main protagonist Juan "Johnny" Rico, a member of the "Mobile Infantry". It is one of the few Heinlein novels which intersperses his typical linear narrative structure with a series of flashbacks. These flashbacks are frequently to Rico's "History and Moral Philosophy" course in school, in which the teacher discusses the history of the structure of their society. Rico is depicted as a man of Filipino ancestry. He is from a wealthy family, whose members had never served in the military. Rico's ancestry is depicted as inconsequential, society having finally abandoned racial and gender-based prejudice.

== Plot ==
The novel opens with Rico aboard the corvette transport Rodger Young (named after real life Medal of Honor recipient Rodger Young), serving with the platoon known as "Rasczak's Roughnecks". The platoon carries out a raid against a planetary colony held by Skinnies. The raid is relatively brief: the platoon lands on the planet, destroys its targets, and retreats, suffering two casualties in the process. One of them, Dizzy Flores, is rescued by Rico but dies while returning to orbit. The narrative then flashes back to Rico's graduation from high school. Rico and his best friend Carl are considering joining the Federal Service after graduation; Rico is hesitant, partly due to his father's attitude towards the military. Rico makes his decision after discovering that his classmate Carmen Ibañez also intends to enlist.

Rico's choice is taken poorly by his parents, and he leaves with a sense of estrangement. He is assigned to the Mobile Infantry, and moves to Camp Arthur Currie (named for Sir Arthur Currie who rose through the ranks to command the Canadian Corps in World War I) on the Canadian prairie for his training under Sergeant Charles Zim. The training is extremely demanding. Rico receives combat training of all types, including simulated fights in armored suits. A fellow recruit is court-martialed, flogged, and dismissed for striking a drill instructor who was also his company commander. Rico himself is given five lashes for firing a rocket during a drill with armored suits and simulated nuclear weapons without ensuring that no friendlies were within the blast zone, which in combat would have resulted in the death of a fellow soldier. Another recruit, who murdered a baby girl after deserting the army, is hanged by his battalion after his arrest by civilian police. Disheartened, Rico thinks of resigning when he receives a letter from Jean Dubois, who taught Rico History and Moral Philosophy. Dubois reveals that he was once a lieutenant colonel in the Mobile Infantry, which gives Rico the motivation not to resign. After further training at another camp near Vancouver, Rico graduates with 187 others, of the 2,009 who had begun training in that regiment.

The "Bug War" has changed from minor incidents to a full-scale war during Rico's training. An Arachnid attack that annihilates the city of Buenos Aires alerts civilians to the situation; Rico's mother is killed in the attack. Rico participates in the Battle of Klendathu, an attack on the Arachnids' home world, which turns into a disastrous defeat for the Terran Federation. Rico's ship, the Valley Forge, is destroyed, and his unit is decimated; he is reassigned to the Roughnecks on board the Rodger Young, led by Lieutenant Rasczak and Sergeant Jelal. The unit carries out several raids, and Rico is promoted to corporal by Jelal after Rasczak dies in combat.

One of his comrades in the Roughnecks suggests that Rico go to officer training school and try to become an officer. Rico ends up going to see Jelal, and finds that Jelal already had the paperwork ready. Rico enters Officer Candidate School for a second course of training, including further courses in "History and Moral Philosophy". En route from the Roughnecks to the school Rico encounters his father who has also enlisted and is now a corporal, and the two reconcile. He is also visited in school by Carmen, now an ensign and ship's pilot officer in the Navy, and the two discuss their friend Carl, who had been killed earlier in the war.

Rico is commissioned a temporary third lieutenant for his final test: a posting to a combat unit. Under the tutelage of his company commander, Captain Blackstone, and with the aid of his platoon sergeant, his boot camp drill instructor Fleet Sergeant Zim, Rico commands a platoon during "Operation Royalty", a raid to capture members of the Arachnid brain caste and queens. Rico then returns to the officer school to graduate. The novel ends with him holding the rank of second lieutenant, in command of his old platoon in the Rodger Young, with his father as his platoon sergeant. The platoon has been renamed "Rico's Roughnecks", and is about to participate in an attack on Klendathu.

== Themes ==
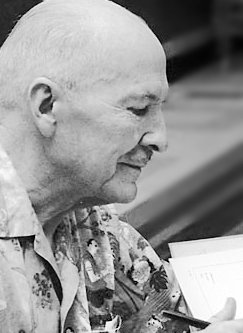
Robert Heinlein in 1976

Commentators have written that Starship Troopers is not driven by its plot, though it contains scenes of military combat. Instead, much of the novel is given over to a discussion of ideas. In particular, the discussion of political views is a recurring feature of what scholar Jeffrey Cass described as an "ideologically intense" book. A 1997 review in Salon categorized it as a "philosophical novel". Critics have debated to what extent the novel promotes Heinlein's own political views. Some contend that the novel maintains a sense of irony that allows readers to draw their own conclusions; others argue that Heinlein is sermonizing throughout the book, and that its purpose is to expound Heinlein's militaristic philosophy.

=== Militarism ===
Starship Troopers has been identified as being a part of a tradition in American science fiction that assumes that violent conflict and the militarization of society are inevitable and necessary. Although the Mobile Infantry, the force to which Rico is assigned, is seen as a lowly post by the characters in the story, the novel itself suggests that it is the heart of the army and the most honorable unit in it. In a commentary written in 1980, Heinlein agreed that Starship Troopers "glorifies the military ... Specifically the P.B.I., the Poor Bloody Infantry, the mudfoot who places his frail body between his loved home and the war's desolation – but is rarely appreciated ... he has the toughest job of all and should be honored." The story is based on the social Darwinist idea of society as a struggle for survival based on military strength. It suggests that some conflicts must be resolved by force: one of the lessons Rico is repeatedly taught is that violence can be an effective method of settling conflict. These suggestions derive in part from Heinlein's view that in the 1950s the US government was being too conciliatory in its dealings with communist China and the Soviet Union.

Heinlein draws an analogy between the human society in the novel, which is well-to-do but needs to be vigilant against the imperialist threat of the Arachnids, and US society of the 1950s. Reviewers have suggested that the Arachnids are Heinlein's analogue for communists. Traits used to support this include the communal nature of the Arachnids, which makes them capable of a much higher degree of coordination than the humans. Bug society is once explicitly described as communist, and is moreover depicted as communist by nature; this has been read as implying that those with a different political ideology are analogous to alien beings. The related motifs of alien invasion, patriotism, and personal sacrifice during war, are present, as are other aspects of US popular culture of the 1950s. Commentators have argued that Heinlein's portrayal of aliens, as well as being a reference to 1950s communist countries, aims to "reinscribe the ideologies of America's mythic frontier history". The concept of the frontier includes a social-Darwinist argument of constantly fighting for survival, even at the expense of indigenous people or, in the case of Starship Troopers, of aliens. Heinlein suggests that without territorial expansion involving violent conquest of other races, humans would be destroyed. Scholar Jamie King has stated that Heinlein does not address the question of what the military government and Federal Service would do in peacetime, and argues that Heinlein has set up a society designed to be continuously at war, and to keep expanding its territory.

=== Coming of age ===
Starship Troopers has been referred to as a bildungsroman or "coming-of-age" story for Rico, as he matures through his tenure in the infantry. His training, both at boot camp and at officer candidate school, involves learning the value of militarism, thus inviting the reader to learn it as well. This is especially true of the parts of his training that involve indoctrination, such as the claim by one of his instructors that rule by military veterans is the ideal form of government, because only they understand how to put collective well-being above the individual. The story traces Rico's transformation from a boy into a soldier, while exploring issues of identity and motivation, and traces his overall moral and social development, in a manner identified by commentators as similar to many stories about German soldiers in World War I. Rico's transformation has been likened to the common narrative within stories with military themes by scholar H. Bruce Franklin. This typical narrative is that of a sloppy and unfit civilian being knocked into shape by tough officers, whose training is "calculated sadism" but is depicted as fundamentally being on the right side. The letter Rico receives from Dubois, partly responsible for Rico "crossing the hump" with his training, is shown as a turning point in his development. The classroom scenes embedded in the story serve to explain Rico's adventures, and highlight his reactions to events around. A notable example is the execution Rico is forced to witness after a deserter from his unit murders a young girl; Rico is uncertain of his own reaction until he remembers a lecture by Dubois in which the latter argues that "moral sense" derives entirely from the will to survive. The concept of the American frontier is also related to the coming-of-age theme. Young protagonists across Heinlein's novels attain manhood by confronting a hostile "wilderness" in space; coming-of-age in a military, alien context is a common theme in Heinlein's earlier works as well. Rico's coming-of-age has also been described as being related to his relationship with his father; the journey "outward" through the novel also contains a search for Rico's childhood and a reunion with his estranged parent.

=== Moral decline ===
Starship Troopers also critiques US society of the 1950s, suggesting that it led young people to be spoiled and undisciplined. These beliefs are expressed through the classroom lectures of Dubois, Rico's teacher for History and Moral Philosophy. Dubois praises flogging and other types of corporal punishment as a means of addressing juvenile crimes. It has been suggested that Heinlein endorsed this view, although the fact that Dubois also compares raising children to training a puppy has been used to argue that Heinlein was making use of irony. The story is strongly in favor of corporal punishment and capital punishment, as a means of correcting juvenile delinquents, part of a trend in science fiction which examines technology and outer space in an innovative manner, but is reactionary with respect to human relationships. As with other books by Heinlein, traditional schools are denigrated, while learning "on the spot" is extolled: Rico is able to master the things required of him in military training without undue difficulty.

Dubois also ridicules the idea of inalienable rights, such as "Life, Liberty and the pursuit of Happiness", arguing that people have only the rights that they are willing to fight and die for to protect. The novel appeals to scientific authority to justify this position; Dubois repeatedly states that his argument is mathematically demonstrable, statements which have led scholars to label the novel "hard science fiction", despite its social and political themes. The "moral decline" caused by this situation is depicted as having caused a global war between an alliance of the US, Britain, and Russia against the "Chinese Hegemony" in the year 1987. Despite the alliance between the US and Russia, this war has been described as demonstrating Heinlein's anti-communist beliefs, which saw "swarming hordes" of Chinese as a bigger threat. The novel draws some comparisons between the Chinese and the Arachnids, and suggests that the lessons of one war could be applied to the other.

== Reception ==
To Heinlein's surprise, Starship Troopers won the Hugo Award for Best Novel in 1960. It has been acknowledged as one of the best-known and most influential works of science fiction. The novel is considered a landmark for the genre, having been described by a 1960 review as one of the ten best genre books of 1959, in a 2009 review as a key science fiction novel of the 1950s, and as the best-known example of military science fiction. The novel has been described as marking Heinlein's transition from writing juvenile fiction to a "more mature phase" as an author. Reviewing the book with others written for children, Floyd C. Gale of Galaxy Science Fiction wrote in 1960 that "Heinlein has penned a juvenile that really is not. This is a new and bitter and disillusioned Heinlein". Rating it 2.5 stars out of five for children, 4.5 stars for adults, and "?" for civilians, he believed that the novel would be "of exceptional interest to veterans with battle experience ... but youngsters will find it melancholy and verbose". Conversely, Michael Moorcock described it as Heinlein's last "straight" science fiction, before he turned to more serious writing such as Stranger in a Strange Land.

By 1980, twenty years after its release, Starship Troopers had been translated into eleven languages and was still selling strongly. Heinlein nevertheless complained that, despite this success, almost all the mail he received about it was negative and he only heard about it "when someone wants to chew me out". The novel is highly contentious. Controversy surrounded its praise of the military and approval of violence, to the extent that it has frequently been described as fascist, and its implication that militarism is superior to traditional democracy. Heinlein's peers were among those who argued over the book; a comparison between a quote in Starship Troopers that "the noblest fate that a man can endure is to place his own mortal body between his loved home and war's desolation" and the anti-war poem "Dulce et Decorum Est" by Wilfred Owen began a two-year discussion in the Proceedings of the Institute for Twenty-First Century Studies from 1959 to 1961, with James Blish, Poul Anderson, Philip José Farmer, Anthony Boucher, John Brunner, Brian Aldiss, among those debating Starship Troopers's quality of writing, philosophy, and morality.

The writing in Starship Troopers has received varied responses, with the scenes of military training and combat receiving praise. In a 2009 retrospective, science-fiction writer Jo Walton wrote that Starship Troopers was "military SF done extremely well". She went on to argue that "Heinlein was absolutely at his peak when he wrote this in 1959. He had so much technical stylistic mastery of the craft of writing science fiction that he could [tell the story] 'backwards and in high heels' and get away with it." Others referred to it as very readable, and found the military scenes compelling. Heinlein's descriptions of training and boot camp in the novel, based on his own experiences in the military, have been described as being rendered with remarkable skill. A 1960 review in the New York Herald Tribune praised the "brilliantly written" passages describing infantry combat, and also called attention to the discussion of weapons and armor, which, according to other reviewers, demonstrated Heinlein's "undiminished talent for invention". Scholar George Slusser described the book in 1986 as the "ultimately convincing space-war epic", praising in particular the "precisely imagined" weapons and tactics, while a 1979 science fiction encyclopedia referred to it as the "slickest" of Heinlein's juvenile books.

Criticism of the style of the book has centered on its political aspects. Heinlein's discussions of his political beliefs were criticized as "didactic", and the novel was derided for "exposition [that was] inserted in large indigestible chunks". Author Ken MacLeod's 2003 analysis of the political nature of Starship Troopers stated that it was "a book where civics infodumps and accounts of brutal boot-camp training far outweigh the thin and tensionless combat scenes". Scientist and author Brunner compared it to a "Victorian children's book", while the Science Fiction Handbook published in 2009 said that the novel provided "compelling images of a futuristic military" and that it raised important questions, even for those who disagree with its political ideology. However, it stated that the story was weak as a tale of an alien encounter, as it did not explore alien society in any detail, but presented the Arachnids as nameless and faceless creatures that wished to destroy humanity. Boucher, founder of The Magazine of Fantasy & Science Fiction, remarked in 1960 that Heinlein had "forgotten to insert a story". A 1979 summary said that though Heinlein's vision might verge on fascism, his tightly controlled narrative made his ideology seem "vibrantly appealing".

=== Criticism of militarism ===
Starship Troopers is generally considered to promote militarism, the glorification of war and of the military. Scholar Bruce Franklin referred to it in 1980 as a "bugle-blowing, drum-beating glorification" of military service, and wrote that militarism and imperialism were the explicit message of the book. Science fiction writer Dean McLaughlin called it "a book-length recruiting poster". In 1968 science fiction critic Alexei Panshin called Starship Troopers a militaristic polemic and compared it to a recruiting film, stating that it "purports to show the life of a typical soldier, with a soundtrack commentary by earnest sincere Private Jones who interprets what we see for us." Panshin stated that there was no "sustained human conflict" in the book: instead, "All the soldiers we see are tough, smart, competent, cleancut, clean-shaven, and noble." Panshin, a veteran of the peacetime military, argued that Heinlein glossed over the reality of military life, and that the Terran Federation-Arachnid conflict existed simply because, "Starship troopers are not half so glorious sitting on their butts polishing their weapons for the tenth time for lack of anything else to do." Literature scholar George Slusser, in describing the novel as "wrong-headed and retrogressive", argued that calling its ideology militarism or imperialism was inadequate, as these descriptions suggested an economic motive. Slusser instead says that Heinlein advocates for a complete "technological subjugation of nature", of which the Arachnids are a symbol, and that this subjugation itself is depicted as a sign of human advancement.

A 1997 review of the film in Salon stated that the novel could almost be described as propaganda, and was terrifying as a result, particularly in its belief that the boot camp had to be an ingredient of any civilization. This was described as a highly unusual utopian vision. Moorcock stated that the lessons Rico learns in boot camp: "wars are inevitable, [and] that the army is always right". In discussing the book's utility in classroom discussions of the form of government, Alan Myers stated that its depiction of the military was of an "unashamedly Earth-chauvinist nature". In the words of science fiction scholar Darko Suvin, Starship Troopers was an "unsubtle but powerful black-and-white paean to combat life", and an example of agitprop in favor of military values.

Other writers defended Heinlein. George Price argued that "[Heinlein] implies, first, that war is something endured, not enjoyed, and second, that war is so unpleasant, so desolate, that it must at all costs be kept away from one's home." Poul Anderson also defended some of the novel's positions, arguing "Heinlein has recognized the problem of selective versus nonselective franchise, and his proposed solution does merit discussion." Complaints were made against Heinlein for the lack of conscription in Starship Troopers. When he wrote the novel, the military draft was still in effect in the US.

=== Allegations of fascism ===
The society within the book has frequently been described as fascist. According to the 2009 Science Fiction Handbook, it had the effect of giving Heinlein a reputation as a "fanatical warmongering fascist". Scholar Jeffrey Cass has referred to the setting of the book as "unremittingly grim fascism". He has stated that the novel made an analogy between its military conflict and those of the US after World War II, and that it justified American imperialism in the name of fighting another form of imperialism. Jasper Goss has referred to it as "crypto-fascist". Suvin compares Heinlein's suggestion that "all wars arise from population pressure" to the Nazi concept of Lebensraum or "living space" for a superior society that was used to justify territorial expansion.

Some reviewers have suggested that Heinlein was simply discussing the merits of a selective versus a nonselective franchise. Heinlein made a similar claim, over two decades after Starship Troopers's publication, in his Expanded Universe and further claimed that 95 percent of "veterans" were not military personnel but members of the civil service. Heinlein's own description has been disputed, even among the book's defenders. Heinlein scholar James Gifford has argued that a number of quotes within the novel suggest that the characters within the book assume that the Federal Service is largely military. For instance, when Rico tells his father that he is interested in Federal Service, his father immediately explains his belief that Federal Service is a bad idea because there is no war in progress, indicating that he sees Federal Service as military in nature. Gifford states that although Heinlein's intentions may have been that Federal Service be 95 percent non-military, in relation to the actual contents of the book, Heinlein "is wrong on this point. Flatly so."

Dennis Showalter, writing in 1975, defended Starship Troopers, stating that the society depicted in it did not contain many elements of fascism. He argues that the novel does not include outright opposition to Bolshevism and liberalism that would be expected in a fascist society. Others have responded by saying Showalter's argument is based on a literal reading of the novel, and that the story glorifies militarism to a large extent. Ken Macleod argues that the book does not actually advocate fascism because anybody capable of understanding the oath of Federal Service is able to enlist and thereby obtain political power. Macleod states that Heinlein's books are consistently liberal, but cover a spectrum from democratic to elitist forms of liberalism, Starship Troopers being on the latter end of the spectrum. It has been argued that Heinlein's militarism is more libertarian than fascist, and that this trend is also present in Heinlein's other popular books of the period, such as Stranger in a Strange Land (1961) and The Moon Is a Harsh Mistress (1966). This period of Heinlein's writing has received more critical attention than any other, although he continued to write into the 1980s.

=== Apparent utopianism ===
The setting of the book is presented by Heinlein as utopian; its leaders are shown as good and wise, and the population as free and prosperous. Slusser wrote in 1987 that Starship Troopers depicts a world that is "hell for human beings", but nonetheless celebrates the ideology of its fictional society. The rulers are claimed to be the best in history, because they understand that human nature is to fight for power through the use of force. The suggestion of utopia is not explored in depth, as the lives of those outside the military are not shown in any detail. The novel suggests that the militarist philosophy espoused by many of the characters has a mathematical backing, though reviewers have commented that Heinlein does not present any basis for this.

Writers such as Farmer, Robert A. W. Lowndes, and Michael Moorcock have criticized the novel for being a hypothetical utopia, in the sense that while Heinlein's ideas sound plausible, they have never been put to the test. Moorcock wrote an essay entitled "Starship Stormtroopers" in which he attacked Heinlein and other writers over similar "Utopian fiction". Lowndes accused Heinlein of using straw man arguments, "countering ingenuous half-truths with brilliant half-truths". Lowndes further argued that the Terran Federation could never be as idealistic as Heinlein portrays it to be because he never properly addressed "whether or not [non-citizens] have at least as full a measure of civil redress against official injustice as we have today". Farmer agreed, arguing that a "world ruled by veterans would be as mismanaged, graft-ridden, and insane as one ruled by men who had never gotten near the odor of blood and guts".

=== Race and gender ===
Authors and commentators have stated that the manner in which the extraterrestrial beings are portrayed in Starship Troopers has racist aspects, arguing that the nicknames "Bugs" and "Skinnies" carry racial overtones. John Brunner compared them to calling Koreans "gooks". Slusser argued that the term "Bugs" was an "abusive and biologically inaccurate" word that justified the violence against alien beings, a tendency which, according to Slusser, the book shared with other commercially successful science fiction.

Some of Heinlein's other works have also been described as racist, though Franklin argues that this was not unique to Heinlein, and that he was less racist than the US government of the time. Heinlein's early novel Sixth Column was called a "racist paean" to a white resistance movement against an Asian horde derived from the Yellow Peril. In 1978, Moorcock wrote that Starship Troopers "set the pattern for Heinlein's more ambitious paternalistic, xenophobic" stories. Robert Lowndes argues that the war between the Terrans and the Arachnids is not about a quest for racial purity, but rather an extension of Heinlein's belief that man is a wild animal. According to this theory, if man lacks a moral compass beyond the will to survive, and he was confronted by another species with a similar lack of morality, then the only possible moral result would be warfare.

The fact that all pilots in the novel are women (in contrast to the infantry, which is entirely male) has been cited as evidence of progressive gender politics within the story, although the idea expressed by Rico that women are the motivation for men to fight in the military is a counter-example to this. A 1996 science fiction encyclopedia said that like much of Heinlein's fiction, Starship Troopers exemplified "macho male culture". The prosthetically enhanced soldiers in the novel, all of whom are men, have been described as an example of the "hyper-masculinity" brought on by the proximity of these men to technology. The story portrays the Arachnids as so alien that the only response to them can be war. Feminist scholars have described this reaction as a "conventionally masculinist" one. Steffen Hantke has described the mechanized suits in the novel, which make the wearer resemble a "steel gorilla," as defining masculinity as "something intensely physical, based on animal power, instinct, and aggression". He calls this form of masculinity "all body, so to speak, and no brain". Thus, in Hantke's reading, Starship Troopers expresses fears of how masculinity may be preserved in an environment of high technology. This fear is exacerbated by the motifs of pregnancy and birth that Heinlein uses when describing how the soldiers in suits are dropped from spaceships piloted by women. Though Rico says he finds women "marvelous", he shows no desire for sexual activity; the war seems to have subsumed sex in this respect. A 1979 summary argued that despite the gestures towards women's equality, women in the story were still objects, to be protected, and to fight wars over.

== Influence ==
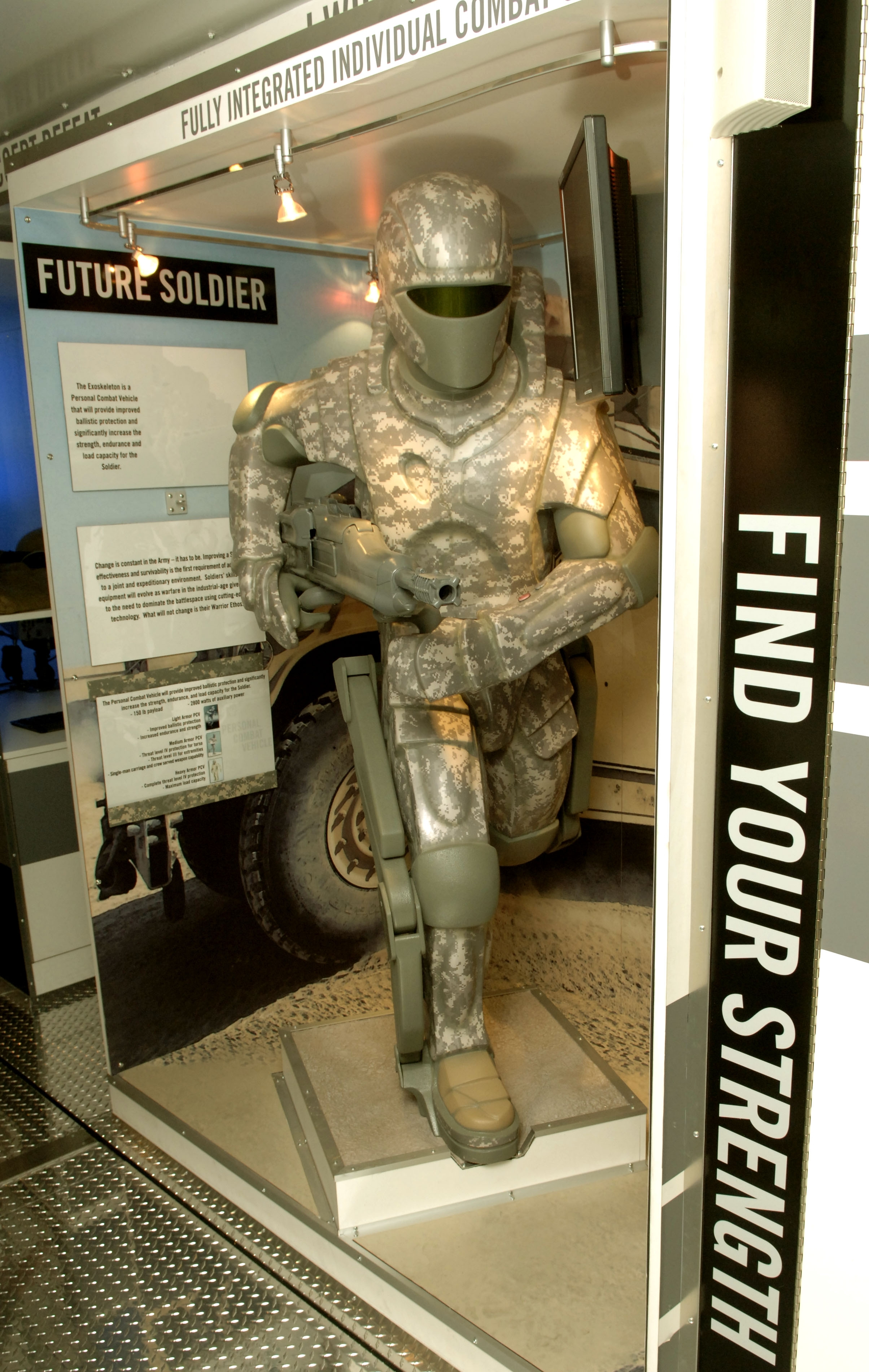
A real-life concept of powered armor, an idea popularized by Starship Troopers

Heinlein's books, and Starship Troopers in particular, had an enormous impact on political science fiction, to the extent that author Ken MacLeod has stated that "the political strand in [science fiction] can be described as a dialogue with Heinlein", although many participants in this dialogue disagree with Heinlein. Science fiction critic Darko Suvin states that Starship Troopers is the "ancestral text of US science fiction militarism" and that it shaped the debate about the role of the military in society for many years.

In addition to his political views, Heinlein's ideas about a futuristic military as depicted in the novel were deeply influential among films, books, and television shows in later years. Roger Beaumont has suggested that Starship Troopers may some day be considered a manual for extraterrestrial warfare. Suvin refers to Juan Rico as the "archetypal Space Soldier". Starship Troopers included concepts in military engineering which have since been widely used in other fiction, and which have occasionally been paralleled by scientific research. The novel has been cited as the source of the idea of powered armor exoskeletons, which Heinlein describes in great detail. Such suits became a staple of military science fiction. Franchises that have employed this technology include Iron Man, Exo Squad, Halo, District 9, Elysium, and Edge of Tomorrow. During the shooting of the science fiction film Aliens, director James Cameron required the actors playing space marines to read Starship Troopers to understand their parts, and also cited it as an influence for the space drop, terms like "bug hunt", and the cargo-loader exoskeleton.

Starship Troopers had a direct influence on many later science fiction stories. John Steakley's 1984 novel Armor was, according to the author, born out of frustration with the small amount of actual combat in Starship Troopers and because he wanted this aspect developed further. The "Mobile Suits" from the 1979 Nippon Sunrise anime series Mobile Suit Gundam were inspired by the powered armor from Starship Troopers. The 1988 Gainax OVA series Gunbuster has plot elements similar to Starship Troopers, depicting humanity arrayed against an alien military. Scholars have identified elements of Heinlein's influence in Ender's Game, by Orson Scott Card, as well. Hantke, in particular, compares the battle room in Ender's Game to Heinlein's prosthetic suits, stating that they both regulate but also enhance human agency. Suvin suggests parallels between the plots of the two novels, with human society in both stories at war against insect-like aliens, but states that the story of Ender Wiggin takes a very different direction, as Ender regrets his genocidal actions and dedicates his efforts to protecting his erstwhile targets.

Conversely, Joe Haldeman's 1974 anti-war, Hugo- and Nebula-winning science fiction novel The Forever War is popularly thought to be a direct reply to Starship Troopers, and though Haldeman has stated that it is actually a result of his personal experiences in the Vietnam War, he has admitted to being influenced by Starship Troopers. Haldeman said that he disagreed with Starship Troopers because it "glorifies war", but added that "it's a very well-crafted novel, and I believe Heinlein was honest with it". The Forever War contains several parallels to Starship Troopers, including its setting. Commentators have described it as a reaction to Heinlein's novel, a suggestion Haldeman denies; the two novels are very different in terms of their attitude towards the military. The Forever War does not depict war as a noble pursuit, with the sides clearly defined as good and evil; instead, the novel explores the dehumanizing effect of war, influenced by the real world context of the Vietnam War. Haldeman received a letter from Heinlein, congratulating him on his Nebula Award, which "meant more than the award itself". According to author Spider Robinson, Heinlein approached Haldeman at the awards banquet and said the book "may be the best future war story I've ever read!"

Harry Harrison's 1965 novel Bill, the Galactic Hero has also been described as a reaction to Starship Troopers, while Gordon R. Dickson's 1961 novel Naked to the Stars has been called "an obvious rejoinder" to Starship Troopers. Ring of Swords, written by Eleanor Arnason in 1993, also depicts a war between two highly aggressive species, of which humans are one. The story deliberately inverts several aspects of Starship Troopers: the story is told from the point of view of diplomats seeking to prevent war, rather than soldiers fighting it, and the conflict is the result of the two species being extremely similar, rather than different.

== Adaptations ==
=== 1997 film ===
The film rights to the novel were licensed in the 1990s, several years after Heinlein's death. The project was originally entitled Bug Hunt at Outpost Nine, and had been in production before the producers bought the rights to Starship Troopers. The film was directed by Paul Verhoeven (who found the book too boring to finish), and released in 1997. The screenplay, by Ed Neumeier, shares character names and some plot details with the novel. The film contains several elements that differed from the book, including a military that is completely integrated with respect to sex. It had the stated intention of treating its material in an ironic or sarcastic manner, to undermine the political ideology of the novel. The mechanized suits that feature prominently in the novel are absent from the film, due to budget constraints.

The film uses fascist imagery throughout, including portraying the Terran Federation's personnel wearing uniforms strongly reminiscent of those worn by the SS, the Nazi paramilitary. Verhoeven stated in 1997 that the first scene of the film – an advertisement for the Mobile Infantry – was adapted shot-for-shot from a scene in Leni Riefenstahl's Triumph of the Will (1935), specifically an outdoor rally for the Reich Labor Service. Other references to Nazism include the Albert Speer-style architecture and the propagandistic dialogue ("Violence is the supreme authority!"). According to Verhoeven, the references to Nazism reflected his own experience in the Nazi-occupied Netherlands during World War II.

The film reignited the debate over the nature of the Terran society in Heinlein's world, and several critics accused Verhoeven of creating a fascist universe. Others, and Verhoeven himself, have stated that the film was intended to be ironic, and to critique fascism. The film has also been described as criticizing the jingoism of US foreign policy, the military–industrial complex, and the society in the film, which elevates violence over sensitivity. It received several negative critical reviews, reviewers suggesting that it was unsophisticated and targeted a juvenile audience, although some scholars and critics have also supported its description as satirical. The absence of the powered armor technology drew criticism from fans. The success of the film's endeavor to critique the ideology of the novel has been disputed.

Four sequels, Starship Troopers 2: Hero of the Federation (2004), Starship Troopers 3: Marauder (2008), Starship Troopers: Invasion (2012) and Starship Troopers: Traitor of Mars (2017), were released as straight-to-DVD films. In December 2011, Neal H. Moritz, producer of films such as the Fast & Furious series and I Am Legend, announced plans for a remake of the film that he claimed will be more faithful to the source material. In 2016, Mark Swift and Damian Shannon were reported to be writing the film.

=== Animated series ===
An animated TV series was also released based both on the novel and 1997 film called Roughnecks: Starship Troopers Chronicles. It follows the exploits of the Mobile Infantry squad, "Razak's Roughnecks", during the SICON–Bugs War between a newly united humanity and an extraterrestrial race, known as the "Bugs", also sometimes referred to as Arachnids. The show focuses mainly on the Roughnecks' missions, rather than addressing the larger war. Paul Verhoeven served as an executive producer. The show ran for one season from August 1999 to April 2000.

=== Other media ===
From October to December 1988, Sunrise and Bandai Visual produced a six-episode Japanese original video animation locally titled Uchū no Senshi with mobile infantry power armor designs by Kazutaka Miyatake, based on Starship Troopers. Dark Horse Comics, Mongoose Publishing and Markosia hold the license to produce comic books based on Starship Troopers, written by authors including Warren Ellis, Gordon Rennie and Tony Lee. Avalon Hill published Robert Heinlein's Starship Troopers in 1976, a map-and-counter board wargame featuring a number of scenarios as written in the novel. In 1998, Mythic Entertainment released Starship Troopers: Battlespace. The web-based interactive game, in which players battled each other in overhead space combat, allowed players to assume either Klendathu or Federation roles, was developed alongside the film adaptation. Starship Troopers: The Miniatures Game was released by Mongoose Publishing in 2005, a miniature wargame which used material from the novel, film, and animated TV series. Spectre Media released Starship Troopers: Invasion Mobile Infantry, a game for PCs, in 2012. Offworld Industries developed and published the 2023 game Starship Troopers: Extermination, a cooperative multiplayer first-person shooter available for PC.

== Sources ==
- Booker, M. Keith; Thomas, Anne-Marie (2009). The Science Fiction Handbook. Singapore: John Wiley & Sons. ISBN 9781405162067. Archived from the original on March 13, 2023.
- Cass, Jeffrey (April 1999). "SS Troopers: Cybernostalgia and Paul Verhoeven's Fascist Flirtation". Studies in Popular Culture. 21 (3): 51–63. JSTOR 23414533.
- Crim, Brian E. (Summer 2010). "The Intergalactic Final Solution: Nazism and Genocide in Paul Verhoeven's Starship Troopers". Shofar: An Interdisciplinary Journal of Jewish Studies. 28 (4): 104–115. doi:10.1353/sho.2010.0038. S2CID 170963056.
- Franklin, Howard Bruce (1980). Robert A. Heinlein: America as science fiction. New York: Oxford University Press. ISBN 0195027469.
- Hantke, Steffen (November 1998). "Surgical Strikes and Prosthetic Warriors: The Soldier's Body in Contemporary Science Fiction". Science Fiction Studies. 25 (3): 495–509. doi:10.1525/sfs.25.3.0495. JSTOR 4240727.
- Heinlein, Robert A. (1987). Starship Troopers. New York: Ace Books. ISBN 9781101500422. Archived from the original on March 13, 2023.
- Heinlein, Robert A. (2003). Expanded Universe. New York: Baen. ISBN 0-7434-7159-8. OCLC 223822885.
- Heinlein, Robert A. (2014). Starship Troopers. ASIN B003ODIWEG.
- Hollinger, Veronica (2003). "Feminist theory and science fiction". In James, Edward; Mendlesohn, Farah (eds.). The Cambridge Companion to Science Fiction. New York City, US: Cambridge University Press. pp. 125–136.
- King, Jamie (1998). "Bug Planet: Frontier myth in Starship Troopers". Futures. 30 (10): 1017–1026. doi:10.1016/s0016-3287(98)00103-7.
- Macleod, Ken (2003). "Politics and science fiction". In James, Edward; Mendlesohn, Farah (eds.). The Cambridge Companion to Science Fiction. Cambridge, UK: Cambridge University Press. pp. 230–240.
- Panshin, Alexei (1968). Heinlein in Dimension. Chicago, Illinois, US: Advent Publishers. ISBN 0-911682-12-0. OCLC 7535112.
- Slusser, George E. (1986). Hard science fiction. Carbondale, Illinois: Southern Illinois University Press. p. 21. ISBN 9780809312344.
- Suvin, Darko (2008). "Of Starship Troopers and Refuseniks: War and Militarism in U.S. Science Fiction, Part 1". In Hassler, Donald M.; Wilcox, Clyde (eds.). New Boundaries in Political Science Fiction. Columbia, South Carolina, US: University of South Carolina Press. pp. 115–144. ISBN 9781570037368. Archived from the original on March 13, 2023.
