= Edward Neumeier =

American screenwriter (born 1957)

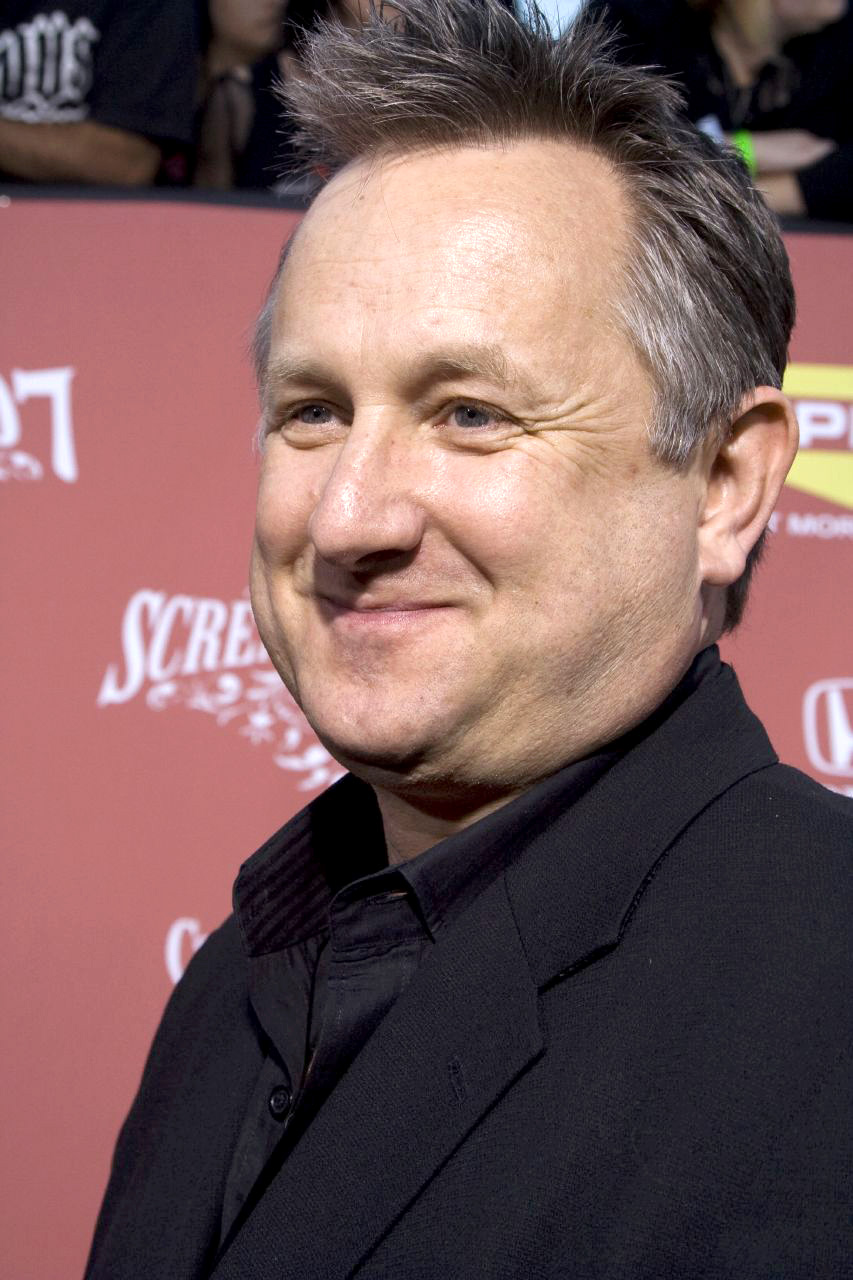
- Neumeier at the 2007 Scream Awards
- Born: Edward Vann Neumeier; August 24, 1957 (age 69)
- Occupations: Screenwriter; producer
- Years active: 1987–present
- Children: Shain Neumeier; Casey Neumeier

Edward Neumeier (born August 24, 1957) is an American screenwriter best known for his work on the science fiction films RoboCop and Starship Troopers. He wrote the latter's sequels Starship Troopers 2: Hero of the Federation, Starship Troopers 3: Marauder (which he also directed) and Starship Troopers: Traitor of Mars.

== Early life ==
Edward Vann Neumeier was born to Gloria and Edward James Neumeier. Neumeier graduated at Sir Francis Drake High School in San Anselmo, California. Neumeier studied journalism at the University of California, Santa Cruz, then attended the School of Motion Picture and Television at University of California, Los Angeles (UCLA).

== Career ==
=== Early career ===
After completing his bachelor's degree at UCLA, Neumeier started work in the Hollywood film business as a production assistant on the TV series Taxi. He went on to become a script reader in the Story Analyst's Union, working at Paramount Pictures and Columbia Pictures. During his time at Columbia, he advocated for putting Risky Business into production; after the film became an unexpected success, he moved on to a job as a junior executive at the Universal Pictures company.

=== RoboCop ===
Neumeier wrote his first outlines and film treatments for his first movie, RoboCop, as well as other spec scripts. He declined an offer of a vice-presidency at Universal Pictures, to develop the screenplay for RoboCop, with Michael Miner.

The rights to the screenplay were bought up by the Orion Pictures company, and was granted a budget of just under $15 million. Paul Verhoeven was assigned to make the movie.

Neumeier also co-produced RoboCop, which was released in movie theaters in 1987 in North America and some other locations. This movie was a success, and it drew just over $50 million worth of ticket sales in the United States alone. The success of RoboCop also motivated the production of two sequels, RoboCop 2 and RoboCop 3, and also two TV series, one live-action and one animated. Most of the creators of RoboCop had left before the production of these sequels.

Neumeier recounts the making in RoboDoc: The Creation of RoboCop, a 2023 four part TV documentary series that premiered on Screambox from directors Chris Griffith and Eastwood Allen, and producer Gary Smart.

=== RoboCop 2 ===
The first sequel to RoboCop, RoboCop 2, was planned to have its screenplay written by Neumeier and Miner. He and Miner had written a dated rough first draft of a screenplay for RoboCop 2 in 1988 called The Corporate Wars. However, due to the 1988 Writers Guild of America strike, Neumeier was unable to write any more of the screenplay. The Orion Pictures company next decided to hire the comic book artist Frank Miller to work on his own screenplay for RoboCop 2.

=== Starship Troopers ===
A decade after the first RoboCop movie was produced, Neumeier rejoined Paul Verhoeven to work on Starship Troopers, which was adapted from the novel of the same name by Robert A. Heinlein, originally written in 1959. With violence and satire thrown into a story of efforts by the human race to ensure its survival, Starship Troopers was more successful in Europe, Asia, etc. than in North America, where it drew gross ticket sales of about $54 million at theaters, although Artforum selected this film as one of the "10 most artistic [film] achievements of 1997". Neumeier also appeared in this film in the brief role of a man convicted of murder and sentenced to immediate execution.

=== RoboCop Returns ===
In January 2018, it was announced that Neumeier was writing a direct sequel to the original 1987 film that would ignore both sequels and the 2014 remake. "We're not supposed to say too much. There's been a bunch of other RoboCop movies and there was recently a remake and I would say this would be kind of going back to the old RoboCop we all love and starting there and going forward. So it's a continuation really of the first movie. In my mind. So it's a little bit more of the old school thing," Neumeier said. In July 2018, it was confirmed a new film, titled RoboCop Returns, was in development, with Neill Blomkamp directing and Justin Rhodes rewriting an original script by Neumeier and Michael Miner. In 2019, Neumeier said that Blomkamp wanted RoboCop Returns to be as close to the 1987 film as possible saying that Blomkamp feels that "it should be the proper Verhoeven if Verhoeven had directed a movie right after RoboCop". On June 29, 2019, Blomkamp confirmed that the original RoboCop suit would be used in this film, saying "1 million% original" when answering a fan's question on Twitter. Blomkamp also gave an update on the script, saying: "Script is being written. Going well! Imagine watching Verhoeven do a follow up film."

== Personal life ==
Neumeier has two children: Casey Neumeier and autistic activist Shain Mahaffey Neumeier. Neumeier lives in Pasadena.

== Filmography ==
=== Feature film ===
Year	Title	Writer	Co-Producer
1987	RoboCop	Yes	Yes
1997	Starship Troopers	Yes	Yes
2004	Anacondas: The Hunt for the Blood Orchid	Yes	No
2014	RoboCop	Yes	No

=== Direct-to-video ===
Year	Title	Director	Writer	Producer
2004	Starship Troopers 2: Hero of the Federation	No	Yes	Co-producer
2008	Starship Troopers 3: Marauder	Yes	Yes	Executive
2012	Starship Troopers: Invasion	No	No	Executive
2017	Starship Troopers: Traitor of Mars	No	Yes	Executive
