= Cuney Homes =

Public housing complex in Houston, Texas, United States

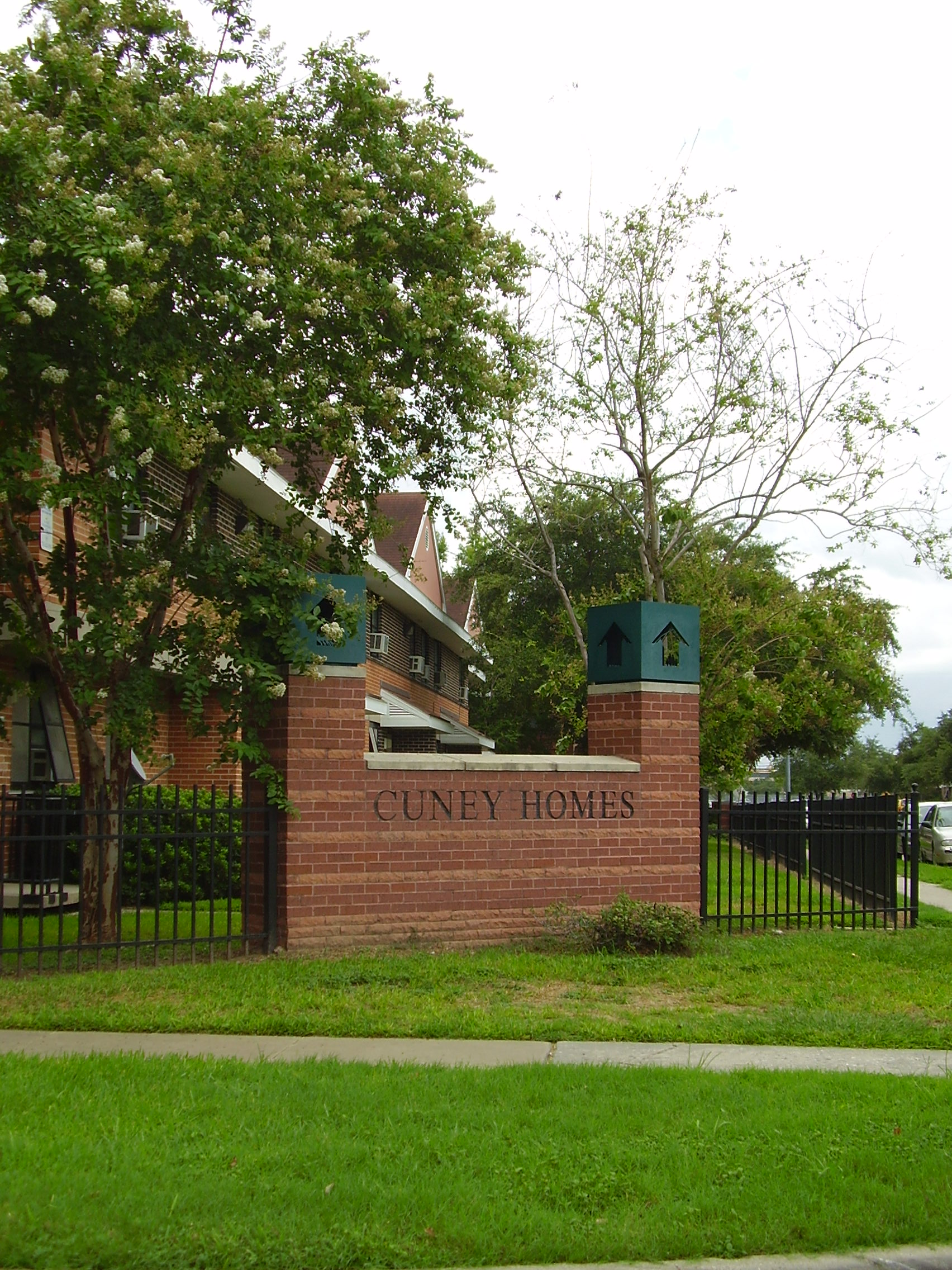
Cuney Homes

Cuney Homes is a public housing complex in the Third Ward area of Houston, Texas. It is operated by Housing Alliance HTX, formerly the Houston Housing Authority (HHA), and was the first complex opened by the authority.

As of 2017 there were nearly 600 people living there. Some were students at area universities, Texas Southern University (TSU) and the University of Houston (UH), seeking affordable accommodations. It is named after Norris Wright Cuney, a Texas politician who assisted African-Americans during the Reconstruction.

The complex is nicknamed "The Bricks" and residents are known as "brickboys".

Cuney Homes has 564 total units that are made up of:

- 224 one bedroom units
- 229 two bedroom units
- 81 three bedroom units
- 45 four bedroom units

== History ==
Cuney Homes first opened in 1938; it initially had 564 units. Its establishment resulted in a large group of African-Americans residing in this area, as Cuney Homes housed poor African-Americans.

It was modernized in 1997, when it won an award from the National Association of Housing & Redevelopment for its modernization.

== Location and layout ==
Cuney Homes is east of the Houston Belt and Terminal Railway (HB&T) and north of Blodgett Street. Cuney is next to Texas Southern University, and Yates High School. Washington Terrace is across the railroad from Cuney.

== Transportation ==
In 2006 METRO (Houston) rerouted some area bus services, prompting Cuney Homes resident council vice president Veronica Deboest to ask for them to restore them to their original locations as they were further away from Cuney Homes. METRO restored Route 68 Brays Bayou to its original routing.

== Education ==
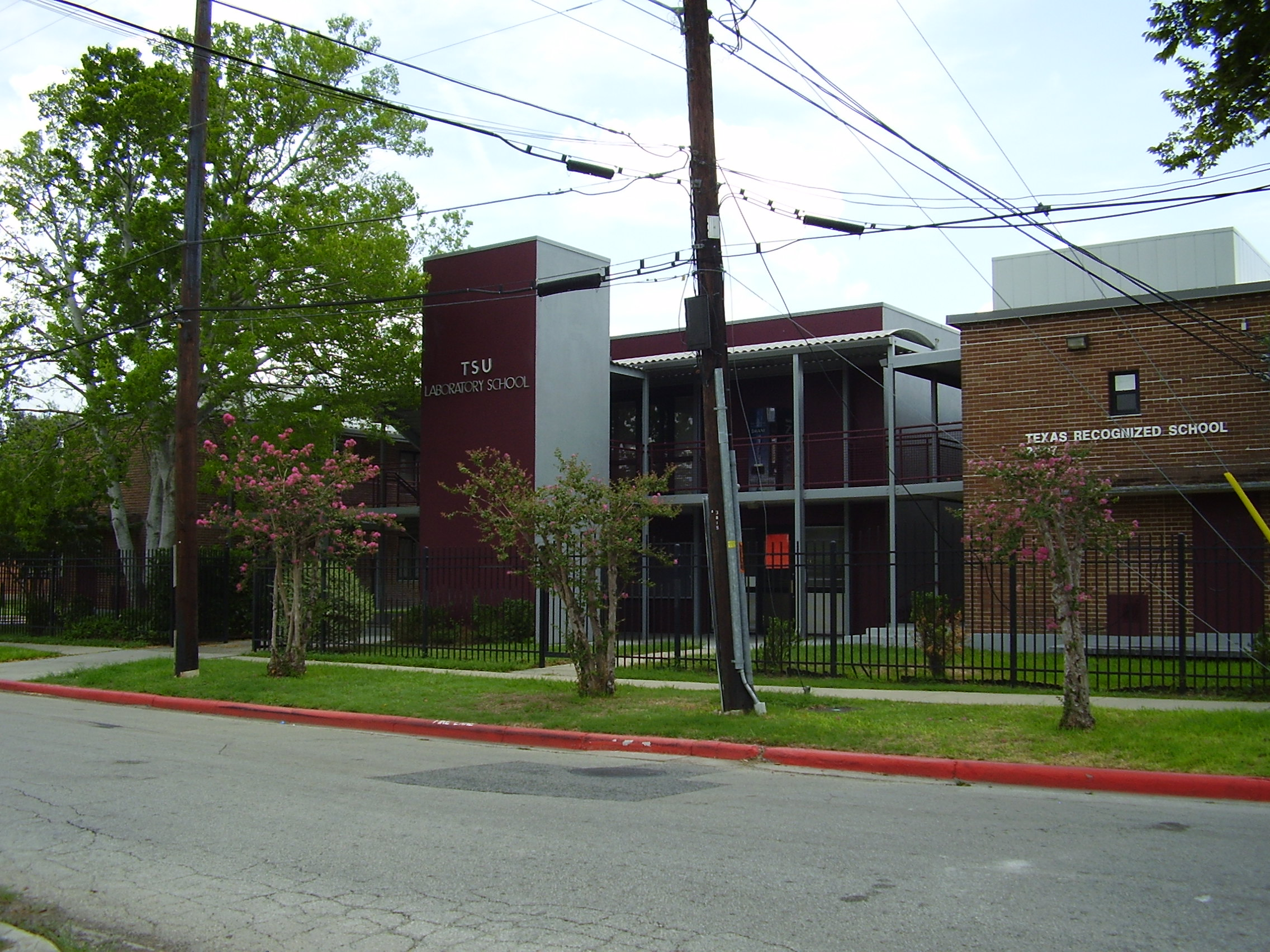
TSU/HISD Lab School

The Houston Independent School District (HISD) operates area public schools.

The Texas Southern University (TSU)/Houston Independent School District Charter Laboratory School, a charter school serving grades Kindergarten through 3, is located in Cuney Homes, making it the sole public school in the city located on the property of public housing. The school, operated in conjunction with the TSU School of Education, opened in August 1995, occupying two former apartment buildings. A new building for the school opened in 1999 with a capacity of 1,200 students. In 1999 62% of the students passed all TAAS tests, and in 2000 49% of the students tested passed all TAAS tests. In 2006 the school had 118 students. That year the HISD board voted to close the school, but area residents sought to reverse this by making it a charter school. That year it ultimately became a charter school affiliated with HISD. The school previously served grades Kindergarten through 5.

The zoned public elementary schools serving sections of Cuney Homes are Blackshear Elementary School and Lockhart Elementary School. Cullen Middle School and Yates High School serve all of Cuney Homes. Cuney Homes was previously zoned to Ryan Middle School; it closed in 2013 with students reassigned to Cullen Middle. Baylor College of Medicine Academy at Ryan, a magnet school which occupies the former Ryan Middle School, is in the surrounding area. Beginning in 2018 the school also serves as a boundary option for students zoned to Blackshear, Lockhart, and MacGregor elementary schools. The former location of DeBakey High School is nearby.

TSU and University of Houston are in proximity.

== Programs ==
There is the Cuney Homes Adopt-A-Family Program which allows area residents to "sponsor" Cuney Homes residents by giving them charitable assistance.

== Notable residents ==
- George Floyd
