= Troup =

Troup may refer to:

== Places ==
- Troup County, Georgia, United States
- Troup, Texas, United States

== People ==
- Alec Troup (1909–1990), Scottish rugby player
- Alex Troup (1895–1951), Scottish footballer
- Anna Troup (born 1970), British ultrarunner
- Anthony Troup (1921–2008), Royal Navy officer
- Bill Troup (1951–2013), American football player
- Bobby Troup (1918–1999), American actor and musician
- Edward Troup (solicitor), British tax lawyer and civil servant
- Frank Troup (1896–1924), English cricketer
- Gary Troup (born 1952), New Zealand cricketer and politician
- George Troup (1780–1856), American politician
- George Troup (architect) (1863–1941), New Zealand architect
- Guppy Troup (born 1950), American ten-pin bowler, father of Kyle
- James William Troup (1855–1931), American steamship captain and shipping pioneer
- Josephine Troup (died 1912), English composer
- Kyle Troup (born 1991), American ten-pin bowler, son of Guppy
- Malcolm Troup (1930–2021), Canadian pianist
- Rasa Troup (born 1977), Lithuanian steeplechase runner
- Robert Troup (1756–1832), American soldier and jurist
- Robert Scott Troup (1874–1939), British forestry expert
- Robyn Troup (born 1988), American singer
- Ronne Troup (born 1955), American actress
- Torell Troup (born 1988), American football player
- Walter Troup (1869–1940), English cricketer

== Other uses ==
- Princess Amelia (1799 packet), a British packet ship captured by the Americans in 1812 and renamed USS Troup

== See also ==
- Troop (disambiguation)
- Troop (surname)
- Troupe (disambiguation)
