= Jack Yates Football =

Jack Yates Football is the football program of Jack Yates High School in Houston, Texas. The program got its start in 1927 when William Sylvester “Babe” Holland, was hired by Principal James D. Ryan to coach football as well as basketball and track. Holland led the program and made the program a success quickly as Yates won the 1930 Texas Negro High School state championship. Since its inception in 1927, the program has won its share of four PVIL Negro League State titles and the UIL state title in 1985. The program also had a run of 27 consecutive district titles from 1970-1996. The Lions have appeared in nine state championship games and have won five titles.

== 1985 UIL 5A State Championship ==
Four years after losing the 1981 state title, the 1985 Yates Lions team dominated the competition and finished with a 16-0 record and is considered one of the greatest teams in the history of Texas high school football. The 85’ team was coached by Luther Booker and broke several records culminating with a 37-0 victory in the championship game over perennial powerhouse Odessa Permian. Yates was the first UIL class 5A team to win 16 games in a single season as well as the first UIL state champion from the Houston Independent School District to win the title since 1953. Yates was also the first historically black school to win a UIL Class 5A title. The Lions recorded a then record 659 points (41.1 per game) allowed only 4.8 points per game and recorded eight shutouts. The 85’ team was voted “Team of the Decade” by the Houston Chronicle and Dave Campbell’s Texas Football.

== NFL Players ==
- Johnny Lee Bailey
- Dexter Manley
- Damion Square
- John Roper
- Aubrey Beavers
- Jerald Moore
- Elvis Patterson
- Santana Dotson
- Coger Coverson
- Reginald Phillips
- Robert Miller
- Melvin Foster
- Philip James
- Eric Hering
- Quintin Smith
- Paris Hamilton
- Steven Jackson
- Albert Fontenot
- James Goode
- Zeno Alexander
- Sloan Hood
- Mike Lewis
