= Trooper =

Trooper(s) or The Trooper may refer to:

== Military or police forces ==
- Trooper (rank), a military private rank
- Trooper (police rank), a rank used by some police agencies
- Airtrooper, a military private rank of the British Army Air Corps
- Troopship, or Trooper, a ship used to transport soldiers
- The Trooper (statue), or The Troopie, a Rhodesian war memorial

== Music ==
- Trooper (band), a Canadian rock band
  - Trooper (album), by Trooper, 1975
- Trooper (Romanian band), a heavy metal band
- "The Trooper", a 1983 song by Iron Maiden
- The Trooper, a 1994 EP by Sentenced
- "Troopers", a 2018 song by Jay Rock from Redemption
- Troopers Drum and Bugle Corps, of Casper, Wyoming

== People ==
- The Trooper (wrestler), or The Patriot, Del Wilkes (born 1961), American professional wrestler
- Trooper Jane, 17th-century English recusant and female soldier
- Trooper Johnson, American Paralympic basketball coach and former player
- Trooper Taylor (born 1970), American college football coach
- Trooper Washington (1944–2004), American basketball player

== Other uses ==
- Trooper, Pennsylvania, US
- The Trooper (film), or The Fighting Trooper, a 1934 American Western film
- Colt Trooper, a revolver
- Isuzu Trooper, also known as the Chevrolet Trooper, an SUV
- Hambantota Troopers, a Sri Lankan domestic T20 cricket team

== See also ==
- Stormtrooper (disambiguation)
- Super Trouper (disambiguation)
- Troop (disambiguation)
- Troupe (disambiguation)
