= Jeff Morrow (disambiguation) =

Jeff Morrow (1907–1993) was an American actor.

Jeff Morrow (or similar) may also refer to:

- Geoff Morrow, songwriter
- Jeff Morrow (composer) on Snow White
- Jeff Morrow (meteorologist) on The Weather Channel

== See also ==
- Jeff Merrow, defensive lineman
