= Baylor College (disambiguation) =

Baylor College is the former name of Baylor University, in Waco, Texas, United States.

Baylor College may also refer to:

- Baylor College of Medicine, in Houston, Texas
- Baylor College of Medicine Academy at Ryan, a middle school in Houston, Texas
- Texas A&M University Baylor College of Dentistry, in Dallas, Texas
