= Riverside Terrace, Houston =

Neighborhood in Houston, Texas

Coordinates: 29.717°N 95.366°W

Riverside Terrace is a neighborhood in Houston, Texas, United States. It is along Texas State Highway 288 and north of the Texas Medical Center and located near Texas Southern University and University of Houston. There about 20 sections of Riverside Terrace that span across North and South MacGregor. The community, formerly a Jewish neighborhood, became a community for African Americans in the 1950s and '60s. It is still predominantly African-American neighborhood with different income levels. It has been undergoing a gradual change in demographics and aesthetics due to gentrification efforts since the early 2000s.

Some articles of the Houston Chronicle describe it as within Third Ward, while some articles discuss Riverside Terrace as being a separate community.

== History ==
Development of Riverside Terrace began in 1924, and it was initially done by the president of Guardian Trust Company, Clarence Malone, who had cofounded the company. Guardian provided the financing, and the first section to open was the portion between Almeda Road, Blodgett Street, Live Oak Street, and Oakdale Street. The brochures highlighted the location of Riverside Terrace, which was considered favorable at the time. Riverside Terrace was designed for wealthier families. In 1927 it was annexed by the City of Houston.

Jewish families moved to Riverside Terrace in the 1920s and 1930s since they were not allowed to settle in other wealthy Houston neighborhoods, including River Oaks. Therefore it became known as the "Jewish River Oaks". At the time most residents of Riverside Terrace were Christian. Allison Wollam of the Houston Business Journal stated that Riverside Terrace "was once on the same affluent level as the swanky River Oaks area." During that period the neighborhood hosted the houses of the prominent Weingarten, Finger, and McGregor families. By the 1950s initial development finished.

In 1952, a wealthy African-American cattleman named Jack Caesar moved to the neighborhood. He stayed despite the fact that a bomb detonated on his front porch. Several Riverside Terrace residents opposed the growth of the community's black population, with some not wishing for racial-based violence to occur in the community and with some on the grounds that property values could decline. In 1959, land clearance began for the construction of the new Texas State Highway 288 freeway, destroying several Riverside Terrace houses. Although Caesar's home was in the path of the freeway, it was moved to another location south of Houston. Many White families left Riverside Terrace and settled in suburbs. The percentage of the population being white declined from 97% in 1950 to 5% in 1970. The population during that period increased due to the subdivision of former mansions and houses into smaller housing units and the establishment of apartments, going from 7,635 in 1950 to 12,519 in 1970.

In the 1960s some white residents who wanted the neighborhood to stabilize as an integrated neighborhood posted signs stating "This Is Our Home It Is Not For Sale." In response to the influx of black residents and spurred on by unscrupulous real estate agents instigating anxieties about falling home values, many white residents sold their homes and moved to other areas of the city. In the spring of 1963 the South Macgregor Promotion Committee formed. It says that it placed the "not for sale" not because it was against African Americans moving in, but because it wanted to prevent block busting. African-American and civil rights figures backed the "not for sale" campaign. In 1963 the community had 175 African American families. The South Macgregor group, which had no black members in 1963, and African-American leaders met and decided that a ratio of between 65-85% White and 15-35% Black would be beneficial to members of both racial groups.

The community gradually transitioned into being majority black and with both affluent African Americans and lower socioeconomic residents. Wealthy African-American doctors, lawyers, politicians, and university professors moved into Riverside Terrace. Houston Chronicle columnist Joy Sewing, who was born and raised in Riverside Terrace, wrote, "Even the more affluent Riverside Terrace area, which was once considered the 'Jewish River Oaks' and loosely part of Third Ward, has never been given its respect. When Black professionals began moving into the area in the 1950s and '60s, white folks got scared and moved out. A few history reports say it became 'Black River Oaks,' and it did."

Riverside continued to be shaped by forces including the departure of area businesses, the growth of UH and TSU campuses, construction of Highway 288, and the decision to locate a county psychiatric hospital in the neighborhood. As time progressed foreclosure and white flight lead to neglect of several mansions. Due to lack of zoning, many large single family houses were converted into apartments, and additional low income apartment blocks were built in the area. Other large houses were converted into housing for fraternities and sororities. Many area businesses catering to the wealthy closed, and nightclubs moved in their place. Jon Schwartz, creator of the 1985 documentary, This Is Our Home It Is Not For Sale, a film documenting Riverside Terrace, states that the neighborhood stabilized after 1970. Circa 1981 the Houston Planning Commission, in Kaplan's words, gave Riverside Terrace a "fair" rating and stated that it continued to be a "viable community that is generally well maintained" although the northern portion was "in a stage of incipient decline" and that overall "continued decline was likely." By the 1980s area residents were concerned that gentrification from white people and property acquisitions from area universities and the Texas Medical Center may affect their community.

Riverside Terrace house sales did not follow the general housing slump in the United States of the late 2000s. The late 2000s has also seen couples and families moving into Riverside Terrace to improve formerly derelict mansions, though some houses remained neglected and abandoned. By 2008 some older properties were demolished and replaced with newer housing. Lisa Gray of the Houston Chronicle stated that this too was a gradual process. Recent improvements include re-development of hike and bike trails along Braes Bayou, aesthetic improvements to Almeda Road (including brick pavement and decorative street lighting), as well as renovation and modernization of some notable older homes.

In 2021 a historic district was proposed. After an initial failed attempt, as the majority of the residents in the original area voted it down, the proposal was scaled down to include 18 houses, and the people in that territory voted in favor. The passing threshold of each vote was 66%. Some area residents oppose the proposal for fear it could increase prices of housing. Erica Greider of the Houston Chronicle argued against trying to immediately make a concerted push for a historic district. Citing that there were not enough people in Riverside Terrace wanting the historic designation, in June 2022 Mayor of Houston Sylvester Turner announced that he nixed the plan.

== Composition ==
Riverside Terrace is in proximity to the intersection of South MacGregor Way and Texas State Highway 288. It is east of the Texas Medical Center and Hermann Park, and south of Interstate 45 (Gulf Freeway). Riverside Terrace is about 3 miles (4.8 km) from Downtown Houston. Shad Bogany of Bogany Properties said in 2002 that the proximity to major landmarks such as tertiary educational institutions, the Texas Medical Center, the Houston Astrodome, and museums is "What sells Riverside Terrace". Allison Wollam of the Houston Business Journal stated that Riverside Terrace is bounded by Scott Street, North MacGregor, Almeda Road, and Wheeler Street. Laura Michaelides of Houston House and Home stated that the boundaries were Almeda and Calhoun on the west and eastern ends, and that Riverside Terrace was on both sides of the Brays Bayou.

Laura Michaelides of Houston House and Home stated that the "gracious" houses on large lots, "large overhanging trees", and a "remarkably hilly" terrain make the area "truly picturesque". Lawrence Wright of Texas Monthly, in 1982, described Macgregor Way, a major road through Riverside Terrace, as "the center of the Black moneyed elite, one of the wealthiest minority neighborhoods in the country" and that it has "central boulevards and bravura mansions" which means the road "recalls—in quite deliberate fashion—the shoulder-to-shoulder palaces of River Oaks."

Riverside Terrace has 1,315 houses, which range from 2,000 square feet (190 m^{2}) to 6,000 square feet (560 m^{2}). 23 subdivisions are within Riverside Terrace. Many houses use the Art Deco and Mid-Century Modern architectural styles. The houses built early in the community's history tend to be Colonial and Tudor Revival varieties while the Mid-Century houses were built in the 1950s. Many styles of houses in Riverside Terrace include those developed by John Chase, John Staub, Katherine Mott, and Joseph Finger. In 2002 Katherine Feser of the Houston Chronicle said "Today, the homes in Riverside Terrace are as diverse as the characters that shaped its history." As of 2002 many houses have burglar bars. Feser said in 2002 that "[m]any homes have been refurbished but chipping paint blemishes several of the beautiful old brick homes." Lot sizes range up to 2 acres (0.81 ha), while some lots are small. As of 2002 Riverside Terrace houses were priced from $30,000 ($54,000 in today's money) to $1 million ($1.8 million in today's money). By 2008 McMansions and townhouses began to replace older housing units.

In 2004 some properties in Riverside Terrace sold for below $200,000 ($340,000 in current money), but real estate listings were scarce.

Residents of Riverside Terrace include athletes, politicians, educators, doctors, lawyers, and other professionals. Sheila Jackson Lee, a U.S. congressperson, said that Riverside Terrace has "a real potpourri of people that like inner city living in a beautiful neighborhood." She added that Riverside Terrace is "a great neighborhood for children.". Other noted residents have included actresses and sisters Phylicia Rashad Allen and Debbie Allen, also a noted dancer and producer.

The community includes Weingarten House, which was the historical family residence of the Weingarten's grocery and real estate family and housed the University of Houston president from 1961 until 1977.

Riverside Terrace, like The Heights and other inner-loop communities, is experiencing gentrification, with more white people moving into the neighborhood. There are emerging issues of displacing African American residents due to rising property taxes and dismissing the rich culture of the community. In 2017, The Houston Forward Times penned the article, "The Disrespect of Gentrification"

== Demographics ==
Riverside Terrace had 7,635 residents in 1950. It was initially a majority white community, as 97% of its residents in 1950 were white; the remaining black population was mostly domestic servants living with their employers. It had 10,027 residents and was 25% white in 1960; 11% of the residents had lived in Riverside Terrace in 1955, and of the population that did not, 78% previously lived in central Houston. 95% of the residents of the section north of the Brays Bayou were African-American during that year. Riverside Terrace had 12,519 residents and was 5% white in 1970.

== Government and infrastructure ==
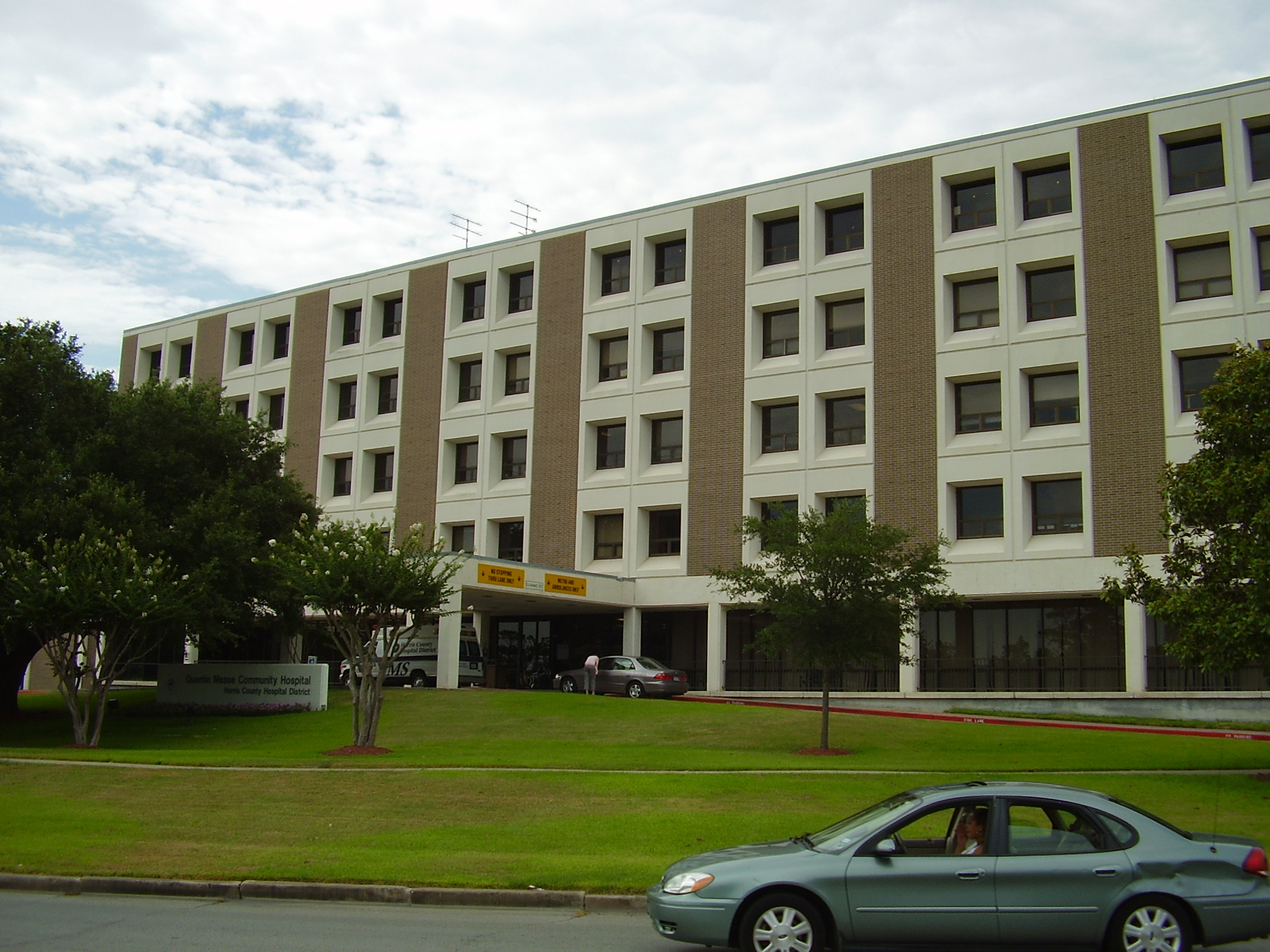
Quentin Mease Community Hospital

In the 1991 Houston mayoral race (see Mayor of Houston), most Riverside Terrace voters voted for Sylvester Turner; the voter turnout for Riverside Terrace was almost 50 percent.

Houston City Council District D covers Riverside Terrace. As of 2020, Carolyn Evans-Shabazz represents the district.

Harris Health System (formerly Harris County Hospital District) operates the Quentin Mease Health Facility (formerly Quentin Mease Community Hospital) within Riverside Terrace. It was previously a long-term care hospital but as of 2021 is being transformed into an outpatient facility. The designated Harris Health System public clinic is the Martin Luther King Health Center. At one point, the MLK health center was located on the first and third floors of Quentin Mease. On May 14, 2010, MLK relocated to a site in southern Houston, on Swingle Road. The designated public hospital is Ben Taub General Hospital in the Texas Medical Center.

The Parkwood Drive Civic Club (PDCC), established in 1924, serves a community in the Riverside Terrace area.

Another area civic associations include Riverside Civic Association, which is bounded by Highway 288, Blodgett, the Columbia Tap Biking Trail and North MacGregor. It includes Riverside Terrace Sections 1-5. West MacGregor Home Owners Association also includes Riverside Terrace sections.

== Education ==
=== Colleges and Universities ===
Riverside Terrance is less than a mile away from Texas Southern University and the University of Houston.

Riverside Terrance is also close to Rice University, University of Saint Thomas, The University of Texas Health Science Center at Houston, University of Houston–Downtown, and Houston Community College - Central.

=== Primary and secondary schools ===
As of 2002 many residents attend magnet programs in public schools and private schools.

==== Public schools ====
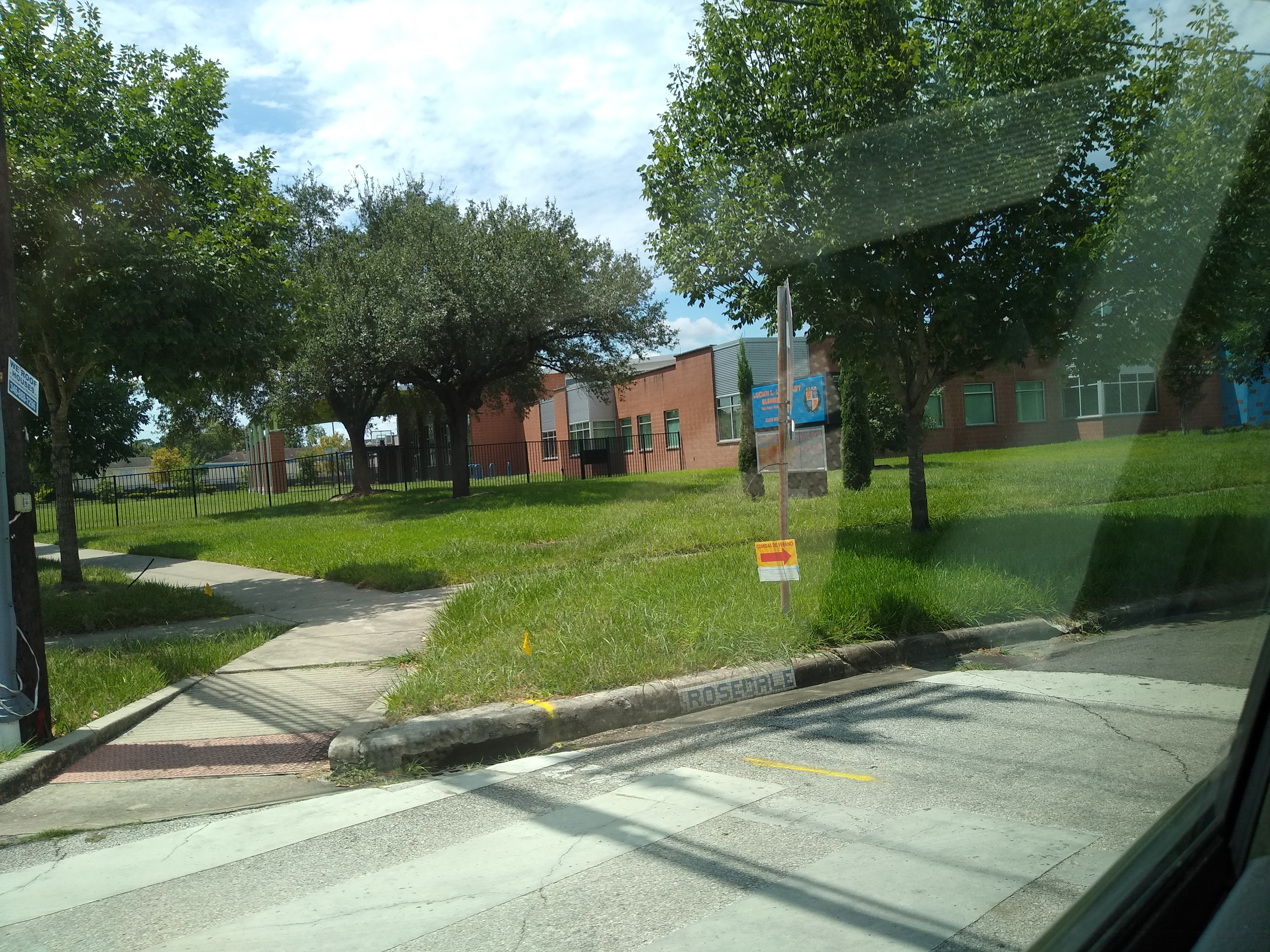
Lockhart Elementary School

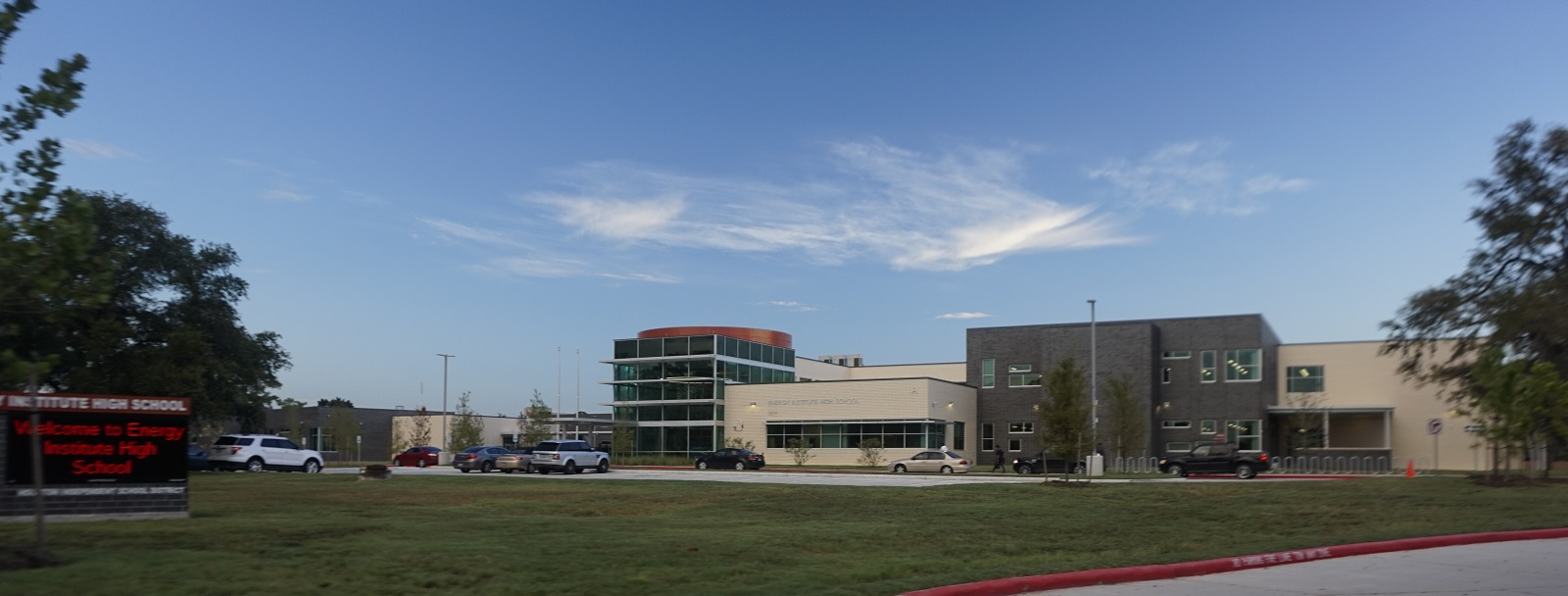
Energy Institute High School building on the site of the former Lockhart Elementary School building

The neighborhood is zoned to schools in the Houston Independent School District. The community is within Trustee District IV, represented by Paula M. Harris as of 2009.

Zoned elementary schools serving portions of Riverside Terrace include Lockhart in Riverside Terrace, Thompson, MacGregor, and Poe outside of Riverside Terrace. All area residents are zoned to Cullen Middle School. Most residents are zoned to Yates High School in the Third Ward, while some are zoned to Lamar High School in Upper Kirby. Beginning in 2018 the magnet middle school Baylor College of Medicine Academy at Ryan also serves as a boundary option for students zoned to Blackshear, Lockhart, and MacGregor elementary schools. The magnet school Energy Institute High School is in the area.

The original section of Riverside Terrace was several blocks away from South End Junior High School, which later became San Jacinto High School and is now the central campus of Houston Community College (HCC), and the first Riverside Terrace section was in proximity to Southmore Elementary School (now MacGregor Elementary). The original brochure for Riverside Terrace from the 1920s highlighted the proximities of the schools. The current Lockhart building, constructed as part of the 2007 Bond, has 85,960 square feet (7,986 m^{2}) of space. Turner, a school which was in Riverside Terrace, closed in 2009 and was consolidated into Lockhart. By Spring 2011 a new campus was scheduled to be built on the Turner site. In 2009 Turner, which occupied a building from the 1920s, had 259 students. The HISD board had approved the consolidation on November 12, 2008 despite the opposition of Sheila Jackson Lee and Sammye Prince Hughes, the head of the Turner parent-teacher organization and the president of the Southwood Civic Club. The current Lockhart building was dedicated on August 22, 2013.

Residents were previously zoned to Ryan Middle School (at the current BCM Ryan location); it closed in 2013 with students reassigned to Cullen Middle.

==== Private schools ====
The Roman Catholic Archdiocese of Houston operates area Roman Catholic private schools. There is one Catholic school in the area, St. Mary of the Purification School (Kindergarten through grade 5). St. Mary, located in the Riverside Terrace area, opened in a temporary building on September 8, 1930. The building was blessed on October 27. The Sisters of Dominic operated the school until it closed in 1967. The school reopened in 1980 as a Montessori school.

Wheeler Avenue Baptist Church operates Wheeler Avenue Christian Academy which currently serves students in Kindergarten through grade 5.

St. Peter the Apostle Middle School was formerly in the area. St. Peter the Apostle in the Third Ward, before its closure, was a PreK-8 school. Its peak enrollment was about 600 students in the 1960s. Prior to 2009 St. Peter was a middle school with grades 6-8; that year St. Philip Neri School merged into St. Peter, making it PK-8. From 2014 to 2019 enrollment declined by 70%. In 2019 St. Peter the Apostle had 33 students; in May 2019 the Archdiocese announced that it was going to close. Debra Haney, the superintendent of schools of the Galveston-Houston diocese, stated that the enrollment decreased due to the proliferation of charter schools.

=== Public libraries ===
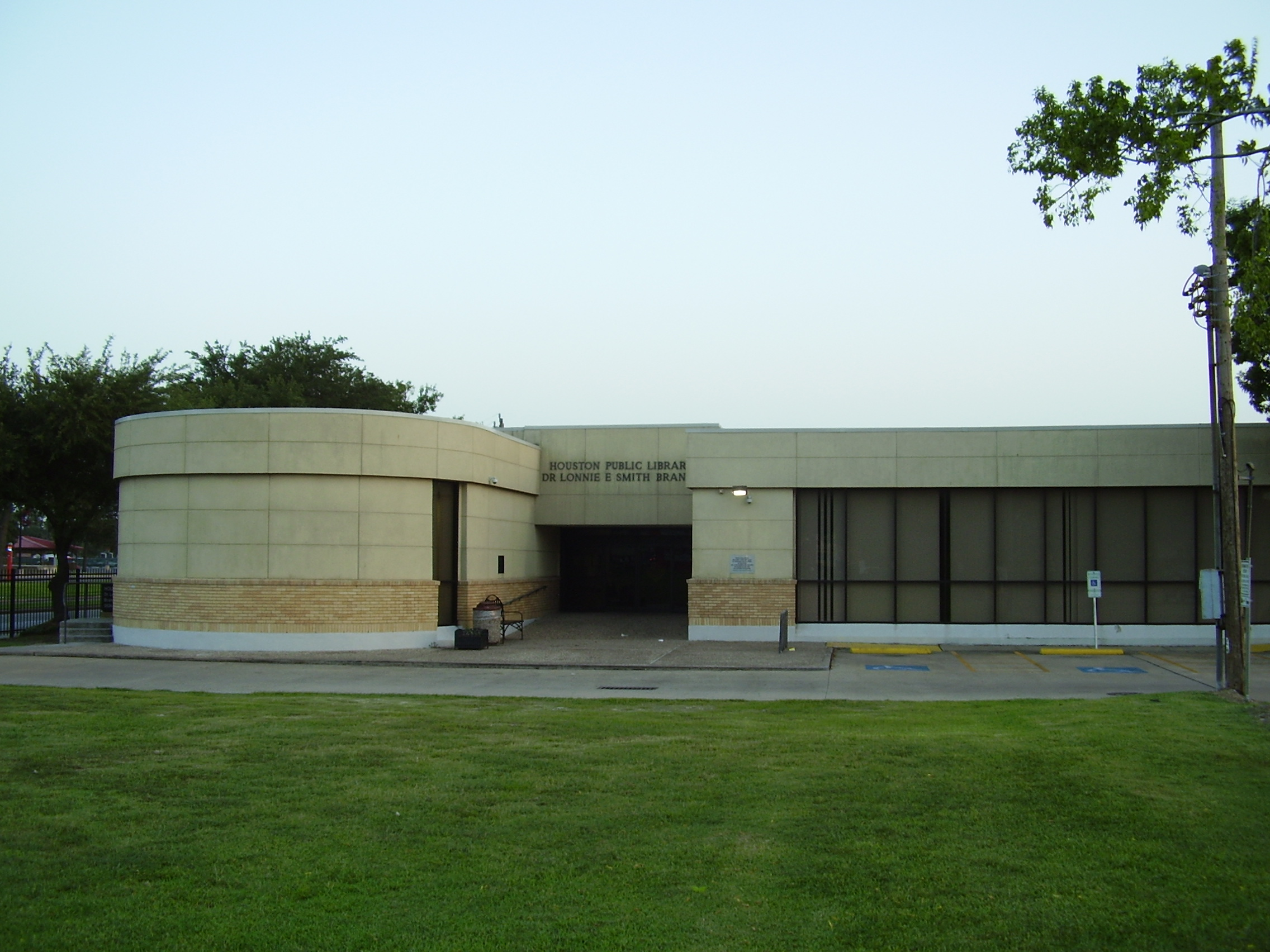
Smith Branch Library

The Third Ward area, including Riverside Terrace, is served by the Houston Public Library Smith Neighborhood Library at 3624 Scott Street.

== Parks and recreation ==
MacGregor Park, Riverside Park, Mills Bennett Park, and Parkwood Park are located in the area as well as the Brays Bayou Greenway Trail and the Columbia Tap Trail.

Riverside Park is in Riverside Terrace Section 5.

Parkwood Park is in Section 10.

The original 1920s brochure emphasized the community's proximity to the Museum of Fine Arts, Houston and Hermann Park.

== Notable residents ==
- Debbie Allen - American actress, dancer, choreographer, singer
- John S. Chase – first Black architect in Texas
- Beyoncé and Solange Knowles – singer-songwriters
- Fredell Lack - American violinist
- Sheila Jackson Lee – U.S. Representative and resident since 1979
- Otis Massey – mayor of Houston
- Phylicia Rashad - American actress
- Stephen Susman – plaintiffs' attorney and founding partner of Susman Godfrey (childhood neighborhood)
- Wesley West - noted Texas oilman, rancher, and philanthropist
- Lynn Wyatt - Houston Socialite and philanthropist
- Hazel Hainsworth Young - Houston educator

== See also ==
- Acres Homes, Houston
- Bordersville, Houston
- Clinton Park, Houston
- Fifth Ward, Houston
- Fourth Ward, Houston
- History of the African-Americans in Houston
- History of the Jews in Houston
- Texas Southern University
