= Washington Terrace, Houston =

Washington Terrace is a subdivision in the Third Ward area of Houston, Texas, United States.

== History ==
Nelms Investment Company initially owned the 1,000 lots established in Washington Terrace, which began development in April 1924; G.E. Simpson Realty Service handled the sale of the houses. The first houses for sale were on Chartres Street, and the lot sizes ranged from 55 feet (17 m) to 105 feet (32 m). Washington Terrace was designed for middle-class families. It was annexed by the City of Houston in 1927.

Washington Terrace was initially a majority white community; the census tract that mostly corresponded to the Terrace was 98% white in 1940—the remaining black population was mostly domestic servants living with their employers or in nearby areas in the same census tract. In 1950 it had 7,354 people, and was 93% white. In 1953 African-Americans became the majority population, In 1960 Washington Terrace had 8,552 people, and was 21% white; however in 1970 it had 7,634 people, and was 11% white. Unlike Riverside Terrace, there was never a period of "filling in" with the construction of apartments or subdivision of previous housing stock, in which the population of that community ultimately increased. Circa 1981 the Houston Planning Department ruled that, in the words of Kaplan, Washington Terrace was "in the stage of accelerating decline."

In 2002 Katherine Feser of the Houston Chronicle reported that gentrification was coming to Washington Terrace. In 2004 the Houston Press named the neighborhood as having the best neighborhood association.

== Location and area ==
Barry J. Kaplan of the University of Houston stated that the boundaries of the development were Blodgett Street, Dowling Street (now Emancipation Avenue), Ennis Street, and Holman Avenue. The Houston Press stated that the Washington Terrace area's boundaries are Alabama Street, Almeda Road, Blodgett Street, Cleburne Street, and Ennis Street. The neighborhood is across from Riverside Terrace, and surrounds Texas Southern University.

According to Kaplan, the brochures highlighted the community's proximity to the central city while also promoting its, in his words, "suburban atmosphere".

As of the 2000s the median year of homes built was 1940.

== Government and infrastructure ==
The Harris Health System (formerly Harris County Hospital District) designated the Martin Luther King Health Center in southeast Houston for the ZIP code 77004. The designated public hospital is Ben Taub General Hospital in the Texas Medical Center.

== Education ==
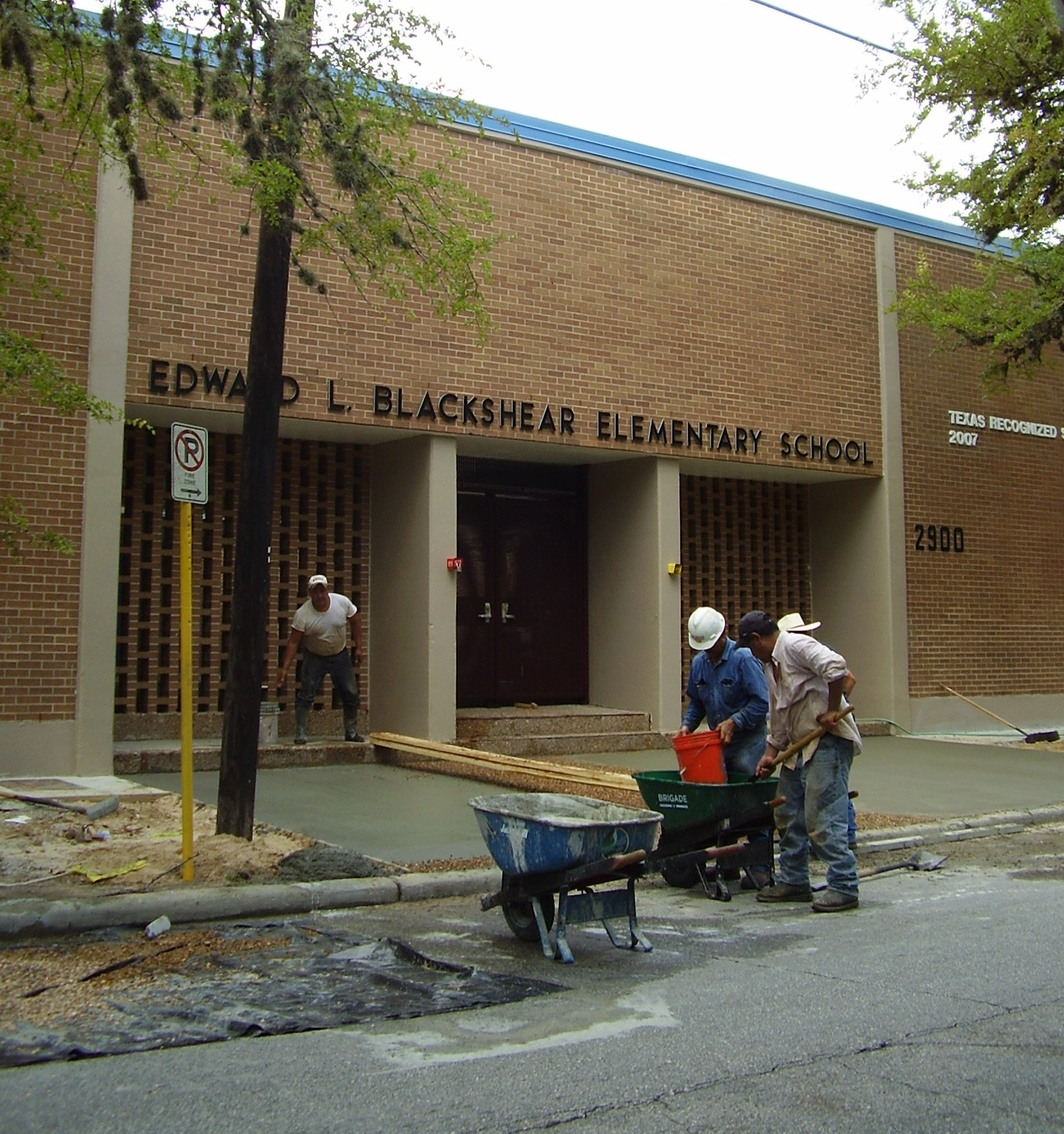
Blackshear Elementary School

Washington Terrace is within the Houston Independent School District. The community is within Trustee District IV, represented by Paula M. Harris as of 2008.

Two elementary schools, Blackshear in Washington Terrace and Lockhart in Riverside Terrace, serve sections of Washington Terrace. The attendance boundaries of Cullen Middle School, and Yates High School include Washington Terrace.

=== History of schools ===
Charlotte B. Allen Elementary School opened in 1907. Blackshear opened in 1916. Yates opened in 1926. William Sutton Elementary School opened in 1929. Allen moved to 400 Victoria Street in 1956; the former Allen campus was renamed J. Will Jones Elementary School. The Sutton school moved to 7402 Albacore Drive in Sharpstown in 1958 and the former Sutton campus was renamed Turner Elementary School. Yates moved to its current location in 1958; Ryan opened in Yates's first location during that year. Blackshear received expansions in 1960, 1965, and 1980. Beginning in 2018 the magnet middle school Baylor College of Medicine Academy at Ryan also serves as a boundary option for students zoned to Blackshear, Lockhart, and MacGregor elementary schools.

Before the start of the 2009–2010 school year J. Will Jones, a school in Midtown which served a section of Washington Terrace, was consolidated into Blackshear. In addition Turner, which served a section of Washington Terrace, was consolidated into Blackshear. By Spring 2011 a new campus was built in the Lockhart site.

Residents were previously assigned to Ryan Middle School (at the current BCM Ryan location). It closed in 2013 with students reassigned to Cullen Middle.
