= SPX =

SPX can refer to:

- S&P 500, a stock market index
- Sequenced Packet Exchange, a networking protocol
- IATA code of Sphinx International Airport, an airport in Giza, Egypt
- Small Press Expo, an alternative comics convention
- SpaceX (SpX), a rocket manufacturer
- Sports Performance eXtreme, a sports shoe and clothing brand
- SPX Corporation, a Fortune 500 electronics company
- St. Pius X, the 257th Pope of the Roman Catholic Church.
  - St Pius X College, Sydney, Australia
  - St. Pius X Seminary, Roxas City, Philippines
- Superphénix, a nuclear power plant
- Skulduggery Pleasant: Resurrection, the 10th book in the Skulduggery Pleasant series
- A file extension used for Speex-encoded audio files
- The National Rail code for St Pancras International railway station in Greater London
- The former IATA and FAA code for Houston Gulf Airport
