= Troop (surname) =

Troop is a surname. Notable people with this surname include:

- Alex Troop (born 1963), Canadian football player
- Arthur Troop (1914–2000), British police officer
- Bill Troop (born 20th century), American(?) author
- Ian Troop (born 20th century), Canadian executive officer
- Jared C. Troop (ca. 1837–1876), Canadian lawyer and political figure
- Lee Troop (born 1973), Australian marathon runner
- Nicholas Troop (born 20th century), British health psychologist
- Sandra Troop (born 1966), British canoeist

== See also ==
- Throop (disambiguation)#People
- Tropp (surname)
- Troup (disambiguation)#People
- Troop (disambiguation)
