= Ryan Middle School =

Ryan Middle School can refer to:

- James D. Ryan Middle School - Houston, Texas
- George J. Ryan Middle School MS216Q - New York City Department of Education - Queens, New York City
- Ryan Middle School - Fairbanks North Star Borough School District - Fairbanks, Alaska

See also:

- Nolan Ryan Junior High School - Alvin Independent School District - Shadow Creek Ranch, Pearland, Texas
