= Raffaella Barker =

English author

Raffaella Flora Barker (born 24 November 1964) is an English author. Born in London, she moved when she was three and was brought up in the Norfolk countryside. She is one of the poet George Barker's fifteen children, the eldest of the five he had with novelist Elspeth Barker. She lives in Norfolk, England with her family.

== Biography ==
Raffaella was born 24 November 1964 and was brought up in Itteringham in Norfolk. After attending Norwich High School for Girls, Raffaella left Norfolk for London where she moved through life modelling, film-editing and journalism before she began writing novels. To date, she has written nine novels, including one for young adults (see "Publications"). She has also written short stories for the radio, worked at Harpers & Queen magazine, as a columnist for Country Life and has been a regular contributor to The Sunday Times, Sunday Telegraph, Harpers Bazaar and The Spectator. She also teaches on the English Literature and Creative Writing BA at the University of East Anglia and the Guardian Novel Writing Masterclass.

== Publications ==
- Come And Tell Me Some Lies (1994)
- The Hook (1996)
- Hens Dancing (1999)
- Summertime (2001)
- Green Grass (2002)
- Phosphorescence (2004) - Young Adult
- A Perfect Life (2006)
- Poppyland (2008)
- From a Distance (2014)
