= Throup =

Throup is a surname of British origin, meaning "at the thorp". Notable people with the surname include:

- Aitor Throup (born 1980), Argentine-British fashion designer, artist, and creative director
- Maggie Throup (born 1957), British politician
- Matilde Throup (1876–1922), Chilean attorney

== See also ==
- Thorpe (disambiguation)
- Throop (disambiguation)
