= Sports Performance eXtreme =

- Industry: Footwear; Apparel
- Founded: Late 1980s
- Founder: Clive King
- Defunct: Late 1990s

SPX or Sports Performance eXtreme, was a footwear and sportswear brand in the late 1980s and early 1990s known for their distinctive sneakers. The brand experienced a brief revival in Asia in the early 2000s under new ownership.

== History ==
The company was founded in the 1980s by Clive King, a British businessman who had held a contract to distribute the Sergio Tacchini sportswear brand in the United Kingdom. Following the end of that contract in 1984, King began to look for another brand to distribute. This led him to discover Troop sneakers which he and a Dutch friend, Herman Gazan, managed to secure a contract to distribute in Europe. The venture was successful and King attempted to negotiate a contract to distribute the British Knights brand of sneakers as well. However, British Knight was not interested in a contract in which King continued to distribute Troop alongside British Knights. This led Knight to develop his own brand of sneakers which he called SPX.

The company logo was one of the most noticeable at the time, with a smaller SP sitting in front of a large red X, with a crown sitting above.

Following their success with footwear, the company subsequently expanded into apparel selling tracksuits which complemented its sneakers. The company entered receivership and shut down in the early 1990s.

In the late 1990s, the SPX trademarks were sold by the receiver to Bernie Pai, the company's former agent in Taiwan. In 2002, Pai relaunched the brand with a focus on the Asian market. The revived brand lasted only briefly.

== Product lines ==
There were three designs that formed the main cornerstone of the brand in the late 80s, and they were all based around the popular basketball style trainer:

- Street Slam – An over ankle high length boot
- Street Lo – Low version, below ankle
- Street Diss – Over Ankle high
- Diss Lo – Lower version
- Freestyle – High ankle version

These trainers played an important part of the 'Basketball trainers' scene, along with Troop, British Knights, LA Gear amongst others.
