= Troop =

Military formation size

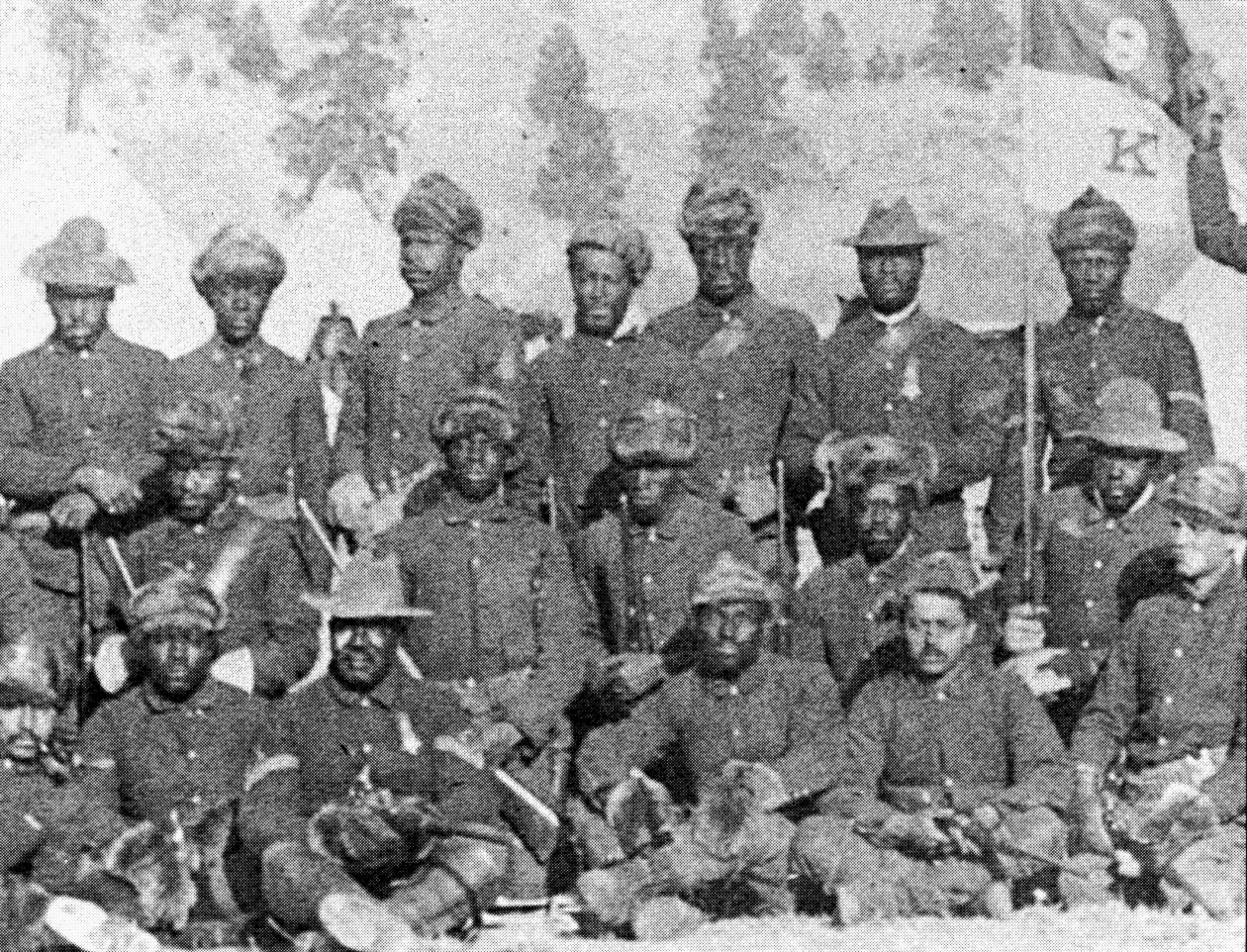
K Troop, 9th U.S. Cavalry

A troop is a military sub-subunit, originally a small formation of cavalry, subordinate to a squadron. In many armies a troop is the equivalent element to the infantry section or platoon. Exceptions are the US Cavalry and the King's Troop Royal Horse Artillery where a troop is a subunit comparable to an infantry company or artillery battery. Historically the remainder of the Royal Horse Artillery used the term troop in the same manner but they eventually aligned with the rest of the Royal Regiment of Artillery in referring to troops as subordinate to artillery batteries.

Troops is often used to refer to the other members of one's company or cause, but because of its military connotations, it conveys a particularly altruistic type of dedicated worker. Traditionally, troops refers to the soldiers in a military.

A cavalry soldier of private rank is called a "trooper" in many Commonwealth armies (abbreviated "Tpr", not to be confused with "trouper").

A related sense of the term, troops refers to members of the military collectively, as in "the troops"; see Troop (disambiguation).

== Troops in various forces ==
Today, a troop is defined differently in different armed forces.

In the Australian Army a troop is the equivalent of a platoon sized element in units of certain corps, those being:

- Australian Army Aviation
- Royal Australian Armoured Corps
- Royal Australian Corps of Signals
- Royal Australian Corps of Transport
- Royal Australian Engineers
- Royal Australian Survey Corps (now disbanded, from australia)
- Royal Regiment of Australian Artillery
- Special Air Service Regiment (SASR)

The SASR is the only unit in the Royal Australian Infantry Corps to use the term troop to refer to its platoon-size elements. SASR troops are also unusual as they are commanded by a captain—most troop or platoon-sized elements are commanded by a lieutenant. In most cases, units which refer to platoon sized elements as troops refer to company-sized elements as squadrons and battalion-sized elements as regiments (regiments in the RAA use the term 'battery' for company-sized elements). Privates in the Royal Australian Armoured Corps and SASR hold the rank "trooper", however this is not the case for any other corps or units, which use the term troops.

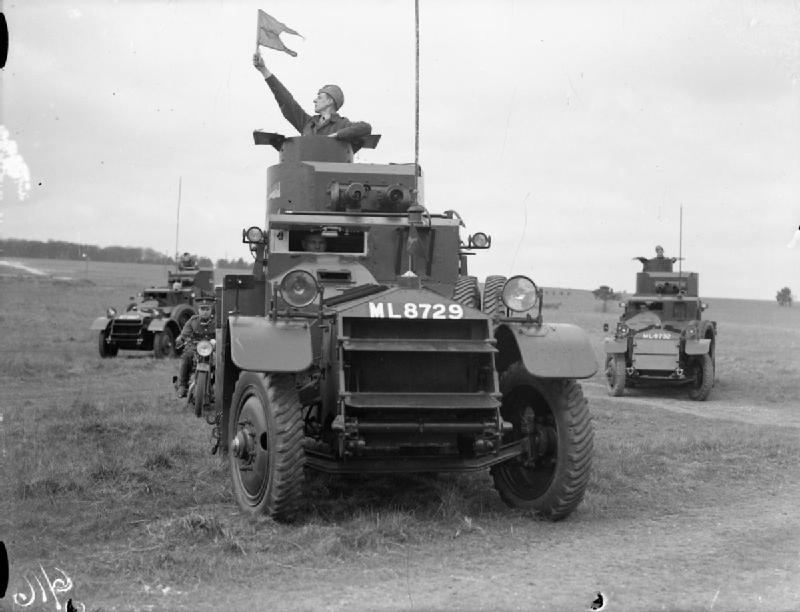
12th Royal Lancers on manoeuvres

In the British Army the definition of a troop varies by corps.

- Household Cavalry and Royal Armoured Corps: Three or four armoured fighting vehicles commanded by a subaltern, i.e. effectively the same level element as an infantry platoon. A unit of two to four guns or launchers, or an equivalent headquarters unit.
- Royal Artillery: A half-battery. In the Royal Horse Artillery, a troop used to be the equivalent to a battery in other artillery units.
- Royal Engineers, Royal Corps of Signals, Royal Logistic Corps, Special Air Service, and Honourable Artillery Company (and formerly the Royal Corps of Transport): A unit equivalent in size to a platoon in other corps, divided into sections or patrols. The Royal Engineers and Royal Corps of Signals used platoons instead until after World War II.

Other Army corps do not use the term.

In the Royal Marines, a troop is the equivalent to an Army platoon; a carryover from the organisation of the British Commandos in World War II.

In the Canadian Army, a troop is the equivalent of a platoon within the armoured, artillery, engineer, and signals branches. Two to four troops comprise the main elements of a squadron.

In the United States Army, in the cavalry branch, a troop is the equivalent unit to the infantry company, commanded by a captain and consisting of three or four platoons, and are called a troop within a regiment. Companies were renamed troops in 1883. In some instances, an infantry company may be titled as a "troop" due to its presence in a cavalry squadron; this is typically the case for the dismounted reconnaissance troop (DRT) of a RSTA squadron, in which an infantry company-sized element is part of a cavalry-branched squadron.

== Troops in civilian organizations ==
In the United States, state police forces are often regionally divided into troops. This usage came from these organizations modelling themselves on the US Army, and especially the older cavalry units. For this same reason the state police and highway patrol personnel of most states are known as "troopers" rather than "officers".

In Scouting, a scout troop is a unit made up of scouts or guides from the same locality under a leader. In the case of Guides, the term "company" is used more often, and was used by the founder in his first books about guiding.
