= Troop (disambiguation) =

A troop is a small unit of cavalry or some police forces.

Troop may also refer to:

== Military and government ==
- Troops, a collective term for soldiers

== Entertainment ==
- Troop (band), an R&B group from Pasadena, California
- Troops (film), an independent spoof of COPS and Star Wars
- F Troop, a satirical American television sitcom
- The Troop, a TV sitcom
- Troop, a family name from Kipling's Captains Courageous
- The Troop (book), a novel by Nick Cutter

== Other uses ==
- Troop (clothing brand), a 1980s hip hop clothing brand
- Scout troop, a unit of boy or girl scouts
- TrOOP, true out-of-pocket expenses (Medicare Part D Coverage)
- Troop, the collective noun for a social group of primates
- Troop (surname)

== See also ==
- Trooper (disambiguation)
