= Tropp (surname) =

Tropp is a surname. Notable people with the surname include:

- Barbara Tropp (1948–2001), American orientalist, chef, restaurateur, and food writer
- Corey Tropp (born 1989), American ice hockey player
- Joel Tropp (born 1977), American mathematician

== See also ==
- Troop (surname)
