= Elspeth Barker =

Scottish novelist and journalist (1940–2022)

Elspeth Barker (born Elizabeth Roberta Cameron Langlands; 16 November 1940 – 21 April 2022) was a Scottish novelist and journalist whose gothic novel O Caledonia became a cult classic, known for its combination of detailed imagery of Scotland and its ironic dark humour.

== Early life and education ==
Elizabeth Roberta Cameron Langlands was born in Edinburgh on 16 November 1940. She was raised in Drumtochty Castle, Aberdeenshire, Scotland, where her parents ran a prep school for boys. From 1958, she read Literae Humaniores (Classics) at Somerville College, Oxford.

== Career ==
As a journalist, Barker wrote features and reviews for The Independent, The Observer, The Sunday Times, the London Review of Books, the Times Literary Supplement and The Guardian. She taught creative writing at universities in the UK, Europe and the US, also holding a position as a Visiting Professor of Fiction at Kansas University. Barker served as a judge for the McKitterick and Sagittarius literary prizes.

Barker's only novel, O Caledonia, was published in 1991. It won four awards, including the Winifred Holtby Memorial Prize, given by the Royal Society of Literature to the best regional novel published by an author from the United Kingdom. It was shortlisted for the Whitbread Prize. Set in the 1950s, the novel traces the coming of age of a misfit teen, starting with her murder, and then tracing her life up to that point. Early coverage in the London Review of Books noted that the "enjoyable squib of a novel gives us Janet's voice, sharp and satirical as the Aberdeenshire winds, making its own weird and discomforting contribution to the portrayal of modern Scotland". Kirkus Reviews commented on its “Brontëan intensity and Gothic nastiness” and “beautifully lyrical evocations of place and emotion.”

Upon its re-release marking the book's 30th anniversary, the novel was praised as "a forgotten gothic masterpiece," "a modern Scottish classic", and praised for prose where "the language sings." A 2023 review in The Economist noted that the heroine's "obstinate individuality is thrilling today, when teenagers' need to fit in seems ever more acute and their foibles are constantly displayed on social media." An eight-part adaptation of the novel was broadcast on BBC Radio 4 in 2023.

Barker edited Loss, an anthology about bereavement, published in 1997. Her reviews and essays appeared in a 2012 collection, Dog Days. Another collection, Notes from the Henhouse: On Marrying a Poet, Raising Children and Chickens, and Writing, was published posthumously in 2024.

== Personal life and death ==
Her first husband was the poet George Barker, with whom she had five children, including the novelist Raffaella Barker. In 2007, she married the writer Bill Troop. Her portrait was painted by UK artist Terence McKenna.

Barker died at a care home in Aylsham, on 21 April 2022, aged 81, from health issues following a stroke.
