= O Caledonia =

1991 Scottish gothic fiction novel

O Caledonia is the first and only novel by Scottish author Elspeth Barker. The novel was published in 1991, and has since gained a cult following. The book is a gothic novel set during and after World War II (largely in the 1950s), about an unconventional girl called Janet, her life and death. It has been described as "glittering, darkly funny" in its handling of complex themes and ideas, related to feminism, agency, and the treatment of the supposed supernatural.

== Synopsis ==
The novel begins by depicting the death of the protagonist, Janet, at the age of 16. It then flashes back to the rest of her life, starting with her birth during the waning years of World War II. Janet's life begins with a great deal of parental support and guidance, before more siblings are born and she starts to be neglected by parents who do not understand her. Once the war ends, she and her family move to a remote Scottish castle, Auchnasaugh, far from their previous home. Here, she develops a love for books, animals, and nature, largely stemming from a lack of positive interactions with other people, who find her strange. She grows somewhat close with her adult cousin Lila, who lives with them. During her teenage years, Janet is sent to a far off boarding school, which she detests and where she does not fit in with the other girls. Here, Janet's isolation continues, as well as her absorption into literature and her studies, while she goes largely unchecked by the adults around her. Cousin Lila, who clashes with Janet's mother, is sent to an insane asylum. Janet nurses a jackdaw chick, called Claws, which becomes her closest companion. She becomes besotted with a young man she has seen at a literary contest, and gets his photograph and writes to him. Her parents find the photo and think Janet she is involved with the young man. As punishment, she is left behind, all alone at Auchnasaugh, one weekend while the rest of the family go away. She drinks and dresses in her mother's clothes. Believing she can see her young man coming to her, she runs into the gardener who stabs her, calling her a "whore". She is buried in a churchyard far from her parents' own plot. The story ends on a bleak note, with no happy ending.

== Major themes ==
=== The role of literature ===
One of the most widely praised parts of the novel is its portrayal of literature. More specifically, the protagonist's relationship with it, and how it entangles and disrupts other parts of her life. It can be seen as a novel with deep origins in other works of literature, with "James Hogg and Charlotte Brontë or Walter Scott and Molly Keane" as its "literary parents".

=== Societal expectations ===
Much of the novel revolves around the main character rebelling from societal expectations, which serves as a driving force for several character motivations. These include her disobedience to her parents, her mother in particular, as well as a deep dislike for her boarding school, which took her away from home. The book portrays a narrative of the benefits of the unconventional. One reviewer said: "How much better, Barker implies, to be clever and odd than gormless or dull," in regards to Barker's purpose in the creation of the novel.

== Reception ==
At its release, the novel did not receive much attention, being the only novel-length release from a relatively unknown author. One of its few early reviews, while commending Barker's literary expertise, criticized the novel for "the unceasing victimization of Janet." However, since then, it has gained a cult following of readers who praise the "haunting if bleakly funny" novel, which is rife with "poetic justice." Later reviewers also called the book "a gem: glittering, original and unforgettable (yet forgotten for decades)," with much of the books mystique tethered to its author's reclusive nature. One Scottish author called the book, "one of the best least-known novels of the 20th century." The Economist, in 2023, called the novel "a lyrical evocation of that sensibility [not to conform]" and "a celebration of obstinate individuality".
