= Throop =

Throop may refer to:

== Locations ==
- Throop, Dorset
- Throop, New York, a town in Cayuga County
- Throop, Pennsylvania, a borough in Lackawanna County
- Throop College, the original name of the California Institute of Technology (Caltech)
- Throop Peak, in the San Gabriel Mountains, California

== People ==
- Amos G. Throop (1811–1894), founder of Caltech
- Arthur Throop (1884–1973), Canadian ice hockey player
- Enos T. Throop (1784–1874), Governor of New York
- Frances Hunt Throop (1860-1933), American painter
- George B. Throop (1793–1854), New York and Michigan politician
- George H. Throop (1818–1896), American teacher and novelist
- George R. Throop, scholar of Greek and Chancellor of Washington University in St. Louis
- George Throop (baseball) (born 1950), American baseball player
- Tom Throop (born 1947), American politician

== See also ==
- Throup, a surname
- Troop (surname)
