= Hazel Hainsworth Young =

American educator (1905–2009)

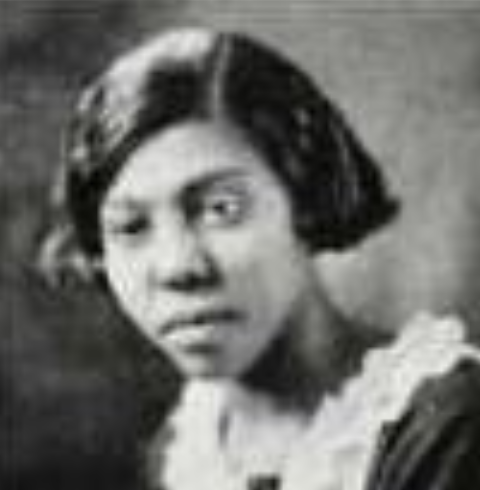
- Hazel Hainsworth Young, from the 1925 yearbook of Howard University
- Born: Hazel Anne Hainsworth; September 12, 1905; Navasota, Texas
- Died: July 3, 2009 (aged 103); Houston, Texas
- Occupations: Educator, clubwoman, philanthropist

Hazel Anne Hainsworth Young (September 12, 1905 – July 3, 2009) was an American educator, clubwoman, and centenarian, based in Houston, Texas. She taught Latin in segregated schools for several decades.

== Early life and education ==
Hazel Anne Hainsworth (sometimes seen as Haynesworth) was born in Navasota, Texas and raised in Houston, the daughter of Harry A. Hainsworth and Beatrice Hainsworth. Her father was a postal carrier. She remembered the Camp Logan Mutiny of 1917.

Hainsworth graduated from Houston Colored High School, and from Howard University in 1925. She was a member of Alpha Kappa Alpha. She founded the first Alpha Kappa Alpha graduate chapter in the Houston area, in 1928.

== Career ==
Hainsworth taught school in Houston for almost fifty years. She taught Latin at Jack Yates High School in Houston after college, from 1926 to 1956, when she became the school's Dean of Girls. She later taught at Wheatley High School from 1959 to 1972. She gave a video oral history interview in 2007 to the Houston Oral History Project.

== Honors ==
The Yates High School library was named for Young in 2005, to mark her 100th birthday. In May 2009, shortly before her death, she was given a “Special Lifetime Achievement Award” by the Houston Independent School District, in recognition of her long career. Congresswoman Sheila Jackson Lee has proposed that a post office in Houston be named for Young, in several House resolutions.

== Personal life ==
Hazel Hainsworth married electrician Howard Young in 1940. They had a daughter, Marianne. Hazel Young died in Houston in July 2009, aged 103 years. (Her sister Maye Frances Hutson also lived to be 100 years old.) The Hazel Hainsworth Young and Robert W. Hainsworth Papers are in the collection of the Houston Public Library.
