= Mike Lewis (American football) =

American football player (1949–2024)

- Lewis in 1972

No. 69, 66
- Position: Defensive tackle

Personal information
- Born: July 14, 1949; Houston, Texas, U.S.
- Died: September 6, 2024 (aged 75); Atlanta, Georgia, U.S.
- Listed height: 6 ft 4 in (1.93 m)
- Listed weight: 261 lb (118 kg)

Career information
- High school: Yates (Houston)
- College: Arkansas AM&N
- NFL draft: 1970: undrafted

Career history
- Atlanta Falcons (1970–1979); Green Bay Packers (1980)

Career NFL statistics
- Games played: 130
- Starts: 96
- Sacks: 25
- Fumble recoveries: 4
- Interceptions: 1
- Safeties: 2
- Stats at Pro Football Reference

Michael Henry Lewis (July 14, 1949 – September 6, 2024) was an American professional football player who was a defensive lineman for 10 seasons in the National Football League (NFL) for the Atlanta Falcons and Green Bay Packers. He played college football for the Arkansas AM&N Golden Lions.

== Biography ==
Mike Lewis was born July 14, 1949, in Houston, Texas. He attended Jack Yates High School in Houston.

Lewis attended Wiley College, private historically black college in Marshall, Texas, playing football there until the school dropped the sport in 1968. He then transferred to Arkansas Agricultural, Mechanical and Normal College in Pine Bluff, Arkansas, where he completed his college career in 1970.

Lewis initially joined the Falcons at their training camp ahead of the 1971 season as a linebacker, but was moved to defensive end as the team already had seven veteran linebackers in camp and there was little chance of cracking the roster at that position. His position switch helped him to make the club's 40-man roster. He saw action in nine games for Atlanta during his rookie year, playing on special teams.

Lewis was shifted to the interior of the defensive line in 1972 and became a starter at right defensive tackle. He started every game for Atlanta at that position through the 1975 season.

Lewis died in Atlanta on September 6, 2024, at the age of 75.

Mike Lewis child is named Mike Lewis Jr and he works at a school as a math teacher for 7th grade
