= Yates High School =

Jack Yates High School
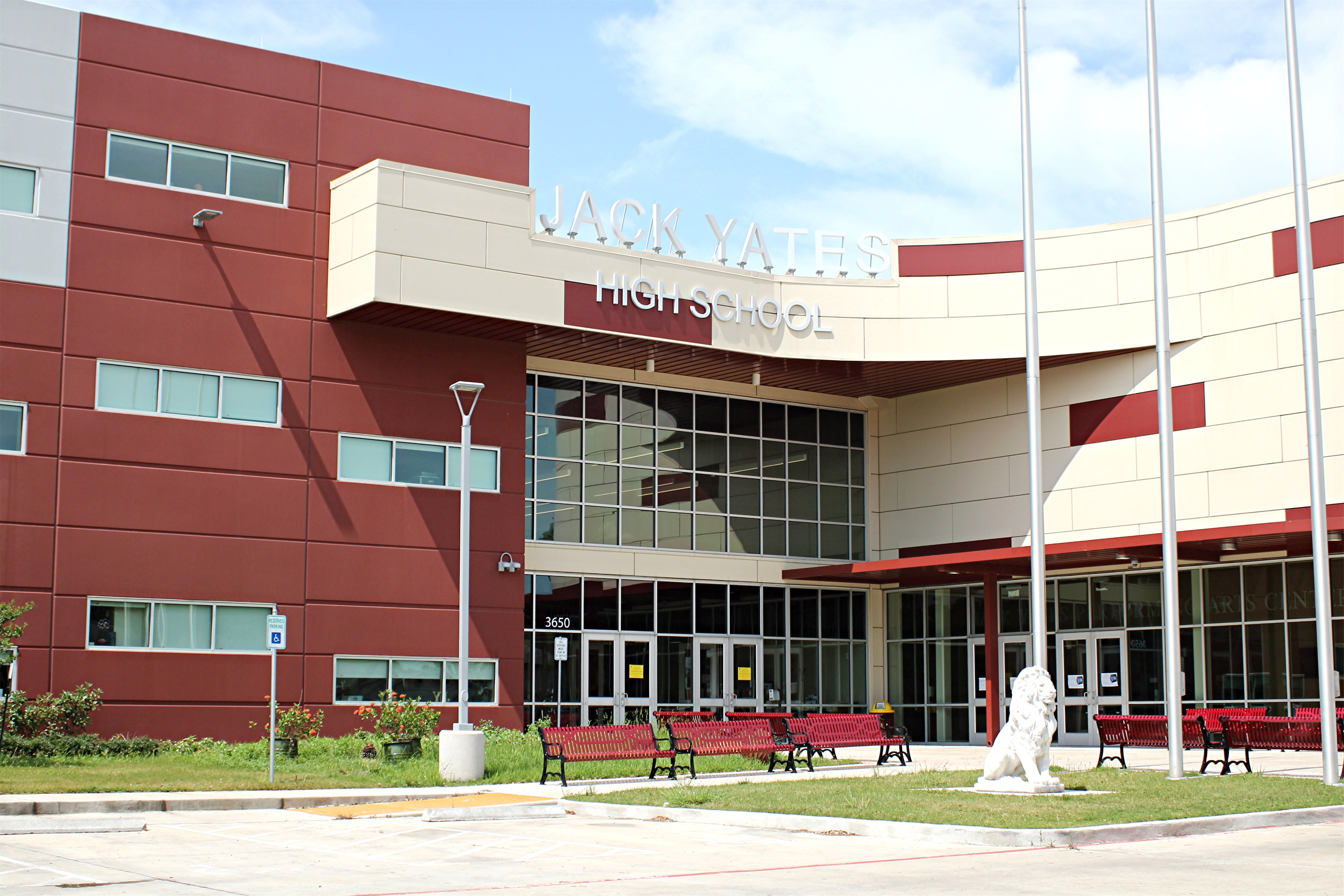

Location
- 3650 Alabama Street; Houston, Texas 77004; United States; 29.7228°N 95.35467°W

Information
- Type: Public high school
- Established: February 8, 1926; 100 years ago
- School district: Houston Independent School District
- Principal: Stephanie Square
- Teaching staff: 51.49 (FTE)
- Grades: 9–12
- Enrollment: 879 (2018–19)
- Student to teacher ratio: 17.07:1
- Colors: Crimson and Gold
- Nickname: "Tha Yard"
- Team name: Lions
- Website: yates.houstonisd.org

Jack Yates Senior High School is a public high school near Texas Southern University in the historic Third Ward in Houston, Texas. Yates High School handles grades nine through twelve and is part of the Houston Independent School District (HISD). It is at 3650 Alabama Street.

Yates was named after Reverend John Henry "Jack" Yates, a former slave and a minister. Jack Yates and other leading blacks established the Houston Baptist Academy. Within a decade, the success of the school prompted Reverend Yates to reorganize the Houston Baptist Academy as the Houston College, the school offered a special opportunity to the black children of the community who sought an alternative to the Colored High School of the public school system.

Yates has HISD's magnet program for communications: broadcast TV, radio, print, and photography. Yates also houses a maritime studies magnet program.

In 2010, Paul Knight of the Houston Press wrote that "the school remains a symbol of solidarity in the Third Ward."

In June 2016, members of the Jack Yates and HISD communities held a ground-breaking ceremony for the new campus. A $59.4 million campus was completed next to the old campus in summer 2018.

== History ==
=== Segregation ===
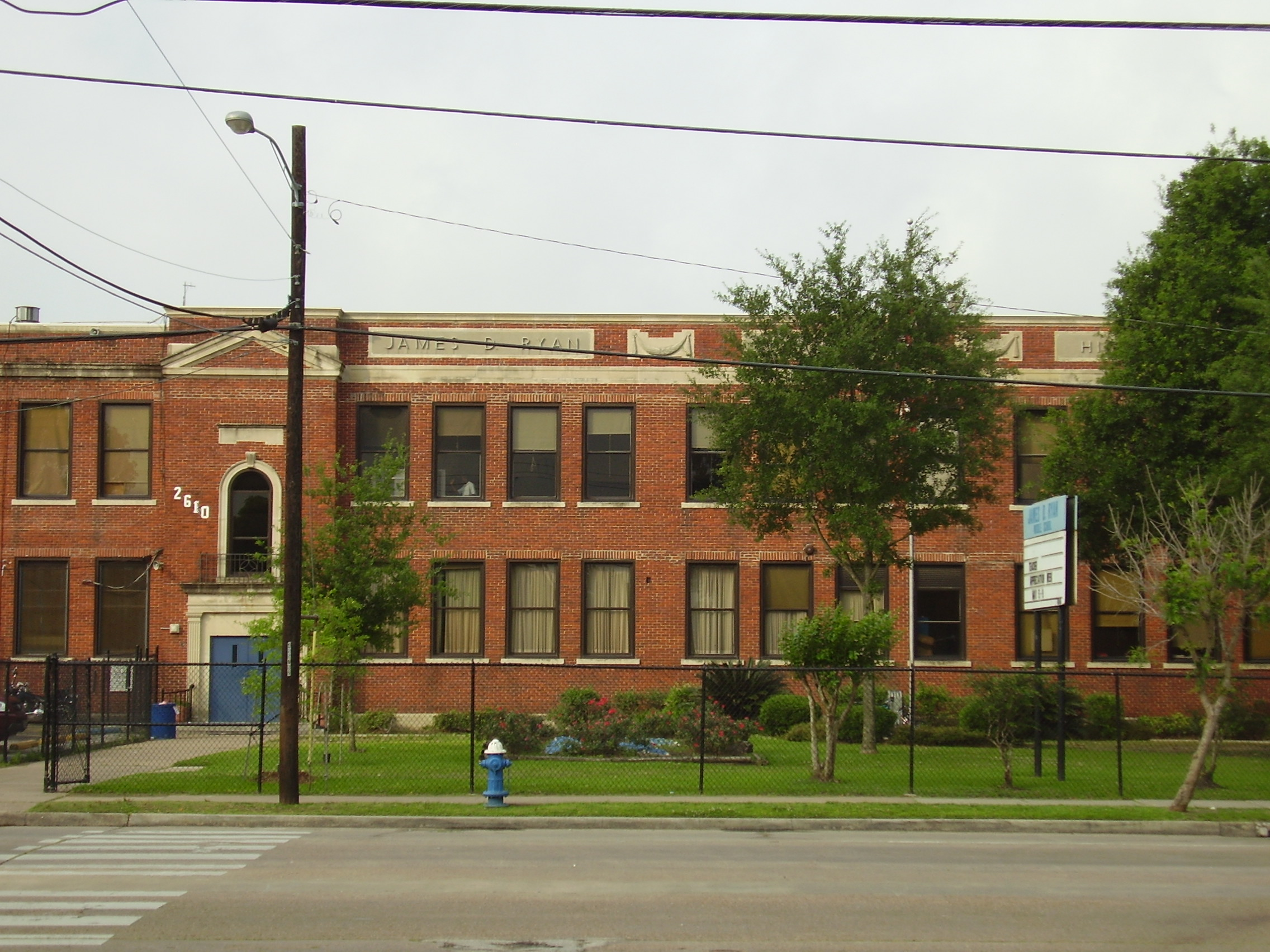
Baylor College of Medicine Academy at Ryan, formerly Ryan Middle School, exists at the first location of Yates Colored High School

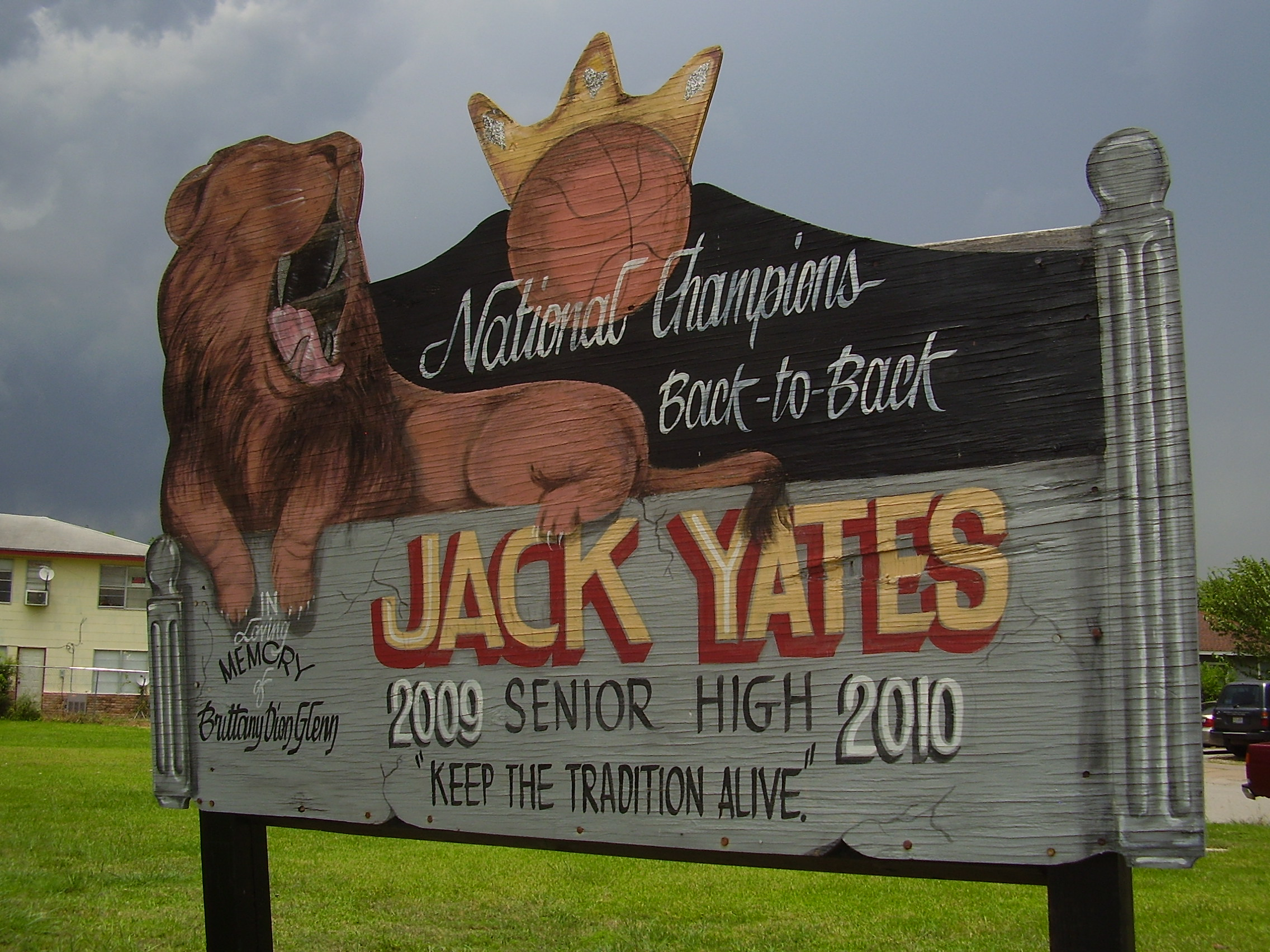
A sign commemorating the school

Yates was established on February 8, 1926, as Yates Colored High School with 17 teachers and 600 students. The school, at 2610 Elgin, was the second school for African-Americans in Houston. At the time schools were segregated on the basis of race.

Previously Houston had only one secondary school for black people, Colored High School. In 1925 the school board stated that it would build a new black high school due to the increasing black population. The Houston Informer stated that the schools need to be named after prominent black people from the city and/or other successful black persons. The new high school was to be named after Jack Yates, a prominent black Houstonian, and the original colored high school was renamed Booker T. Washington High School.

The original Yates High was built from a $4 million (about $73434535.1 when accounting for inflation) bond program, which included $500,000 (about $9179316.89 when accounting for inflation) to renovate 17 existing schools and build new schools. Clifton Richardson, the editor of the Houston Informer, had felt skepticism towards this proposal but ultimately asked Houston's African-Americans to vote for the bond and endorsed it in the Informer. In 1925, HISD originally proposed to have the school built for $100,000 (about $18358633.78 when accounting for inflation), but Richardson opposed this plan, prompting the district to revise the bond. The first principal, James D. Ryan, served from the opening until his death in 1941; William S. Holland became Yates's second principal that year.

In 1927, the Yates building began housing Houston Colored Junior College, later Houston College for Negroes.

In pre-desegregation times middle and upper class black families sent their children to Yates.

By February 1951, Yates had 2,100 students. By that month Jack Yates had an addition that slightly increased student capacity and a remodeling, but the school was still overcrowded as the enlarged facility was designed for 1,600 students. By March 1954 the student body was over 3,000. As a result of the overcrowding the Southern Association of Secondary Schools pulled Yates's accreditation.

In 1955, as a new Allen Elementary School opened in a neighborhood far from its original location, the former Allen campus, in what is now Midtown, became the Yates Annex, a school for black 7th graders. In 1956, the annex was converted into J. Will Jones Elementary School.

On January 27, 1958, Worthing High School opened, relieving Yates. Yates moved to its Sampson Street location in September 1958. Yates's former site became Ryan Colored Junior High School (now Ryan Middle School), named after the first principal of Yates. The HISD school board forced Holland to stay at Ryan Middle School instead of moving onto the new Yates, and a petition from the community did not succeed in changing this.

Schools in HISD were named after former principals William S. Holland and James E. Codwell.

=== Desegregation and post-desegregation ===
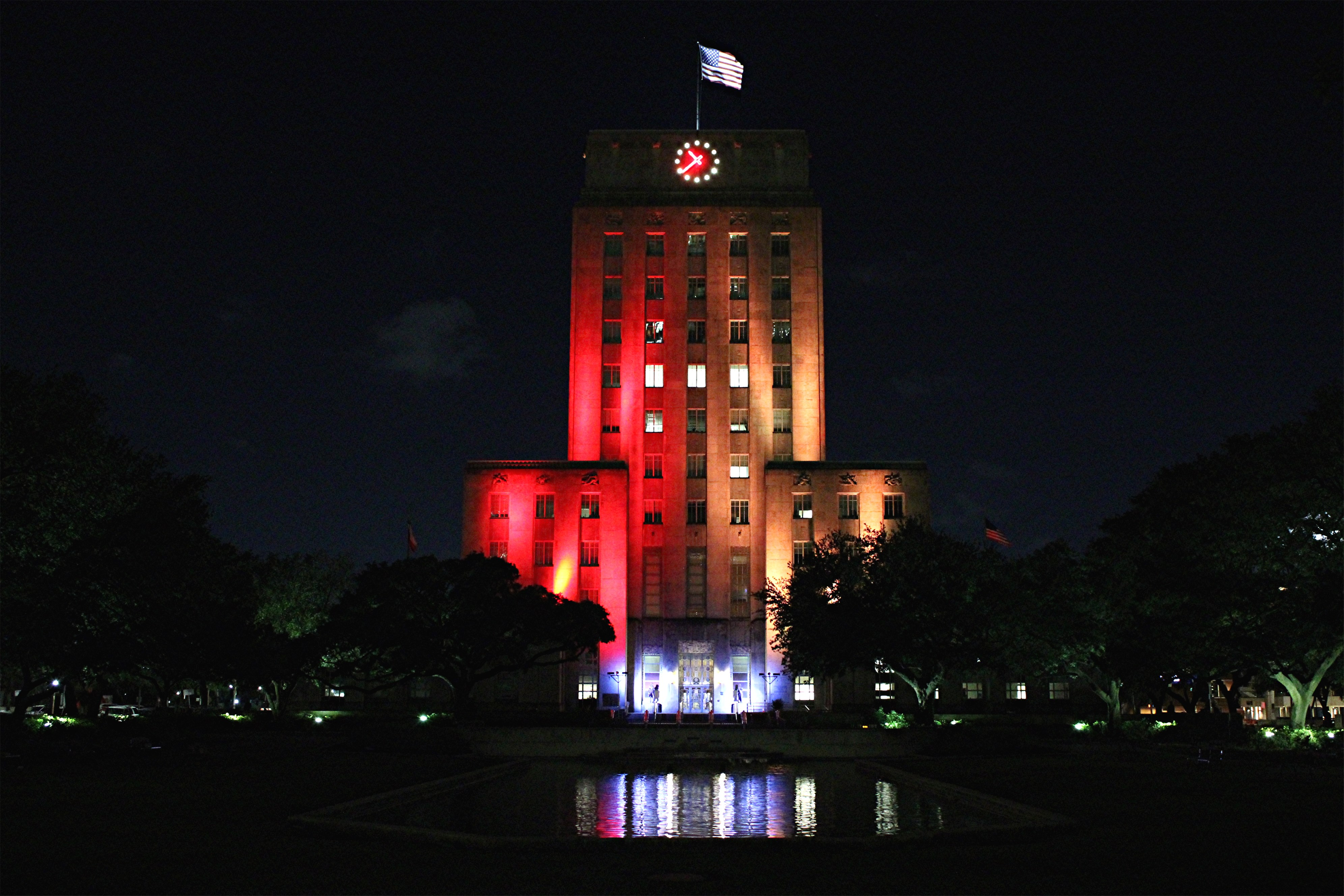
Houston City Hall in Yates' crimson and gold in honor of George Floyd in June 2020

After the 1970 desegregation resulting from the Civil Rights Movement, HISD had established magnet programs and other alternative education programs. Many upper and middle class blacks sent their children to Bellaire High School, Lamar High School, and other schools previously only for Whites; until 1970 HISD counted its Hispanic and Latino students as "white." In addition, many black people moved from the Third Ward to the suburbs. Violence became more common and the facility was defaced with graffiti. William G. Ouchi, author of Making Schools Work: A Revolutionary Plan to Get Your Children the Education They Need, wrote that due to the loss of the middle and upper class students, Yates "fell on hard times."

The Yates photography magnet school program began in fall 1978.

In 1987, a survey at Yates showed that 108 female students were pregnant and 50% of them were having their second pregnancies. In 1989 Chester Smith, the principal, prohibited the school newspaper from publishing a story about a pregnant student.

In the 1990s, superintendent Rod Paige recruited Robert Worthy, who was previously teaching in the Pasadena Independent School District, to revitalize the school. Worthy removed most of the administrators and 60 teachers, making up about half of the faculty, within a two-year period to remove any pre-existing negative cultural influences from Yates. Worthy also established additional Advanced Placement courses and removed a Cleaning and Pressing Program.

In 1997, a geographic area south of Interstate 45 was rezoned from Austin High School to Yates. After the 2000 opening of Chávez High School, portions of the Yates boundary were reassigned to Austin High School.

From 1998 through 2002, the school reported that 99% of students graduating from Yates planned to attend colleges and universities. In response a parent and alumnus of Yates quoted in a 2003 The New York Times article, Larry Blackmon, stated that "Absolutely, positively, no way. You'd get more of an accurate count asking elementary kids if they plan to go to college."

Around 2003, Yates' principal hired several uncertified teachers and substitute teachers, using them to replace experienced but more highly paid teachers who were fired by the principal. In addition around that time Yates had gone without a school library for over a year.

In 2006, Houston mayor Bill White proclaimed February 7 as "Jack Yates Senior High School Day."

In 2007, a Johns Hopkins University study commissioned by the Associated Press cited Yates as a "dropout factory" where at least 40% of the entering freshman class do not make it to their senior year.

In 2008 Ouchi stated that Yates had improved during Worthy's term as principal, citing the "pride" present in the school, the students' compliance with the school uniform policy, and hallways that were "clean enough to eat on".

Yates, along with Sam Houston High School and Kashmere High School, was low-performing in test scores from 2001 to 2004. Because of this problem, there were movements to have the state or another organization take over the schools for a period so the test scores would be at acceptable levels. Yates received an "acceptable" rating from the Texas Education Agency in 2005.

The 2005 enrollment was below 50% of the enrollment 20 years prior. In a 2005 Houston Chronicle article Bill Miller, president of the Yates High School Parent-Teacher-Student Association, criticized the decrease in enrollment. Many students in the Yates High School attendance zone instead chose to attend other high schools. Miller proposed having HISD end its open enrollment policies.

In an e-mail sent in 2010, HISD board member and former Yates student Paula Harris said that she was responsible for having a principal at Yates removed from the school and for having the new principal installed.

In June 2015, Ericka Mellon of the Houston Chronicle wrote that members of the Third Ward community had "concerns about leadership turnover, weak academic performance and safety problems" and were "vocal with its frustrations at Yates".

In May 2015, Donetrus Hill, then the principal of Yates, resigned and took a settlement agreement. Kenneth Davis, who previously served as the principal of Dowling Middle School (now Lawson Middle School) and as a supervisor of HISD middle school principals, became the principal of Yates at that time.

In June 2018, Tiffany Guillory became the principal. In December 2022 HISD administrators placed her on leave. The district leadership did not publicly state why the leave had occurred. Residents in the area stated opposition against a proposal to remove Guillory, and the HISD board of trustees decided to retain her as principal.

In 2023, Stephanie Square became principal.

== Served neighborhoods ==
Several areas inside the 610 Loop that are south of Downtown, including the Third Ward, Timbercrest, University Oaks, Oak Manor, University Woods, Scott Terrace, Lucky 7, South Union, Foster Place, Washington Terrace, MacGregor Place, and LaSalette Place, as well as most of Riverside Terrace, are zoned to Yates.

Cuney Homes, a unit of Houston Housing Authority (HHA) public housing, is zoned to Yates.

In addition, Cambridge Oaks, a university housing complex, is zoned to Yates. Cambridge Oaks houses University of Houston students who have dependent children and is the institution's designated family housing unit.

== Campus ==
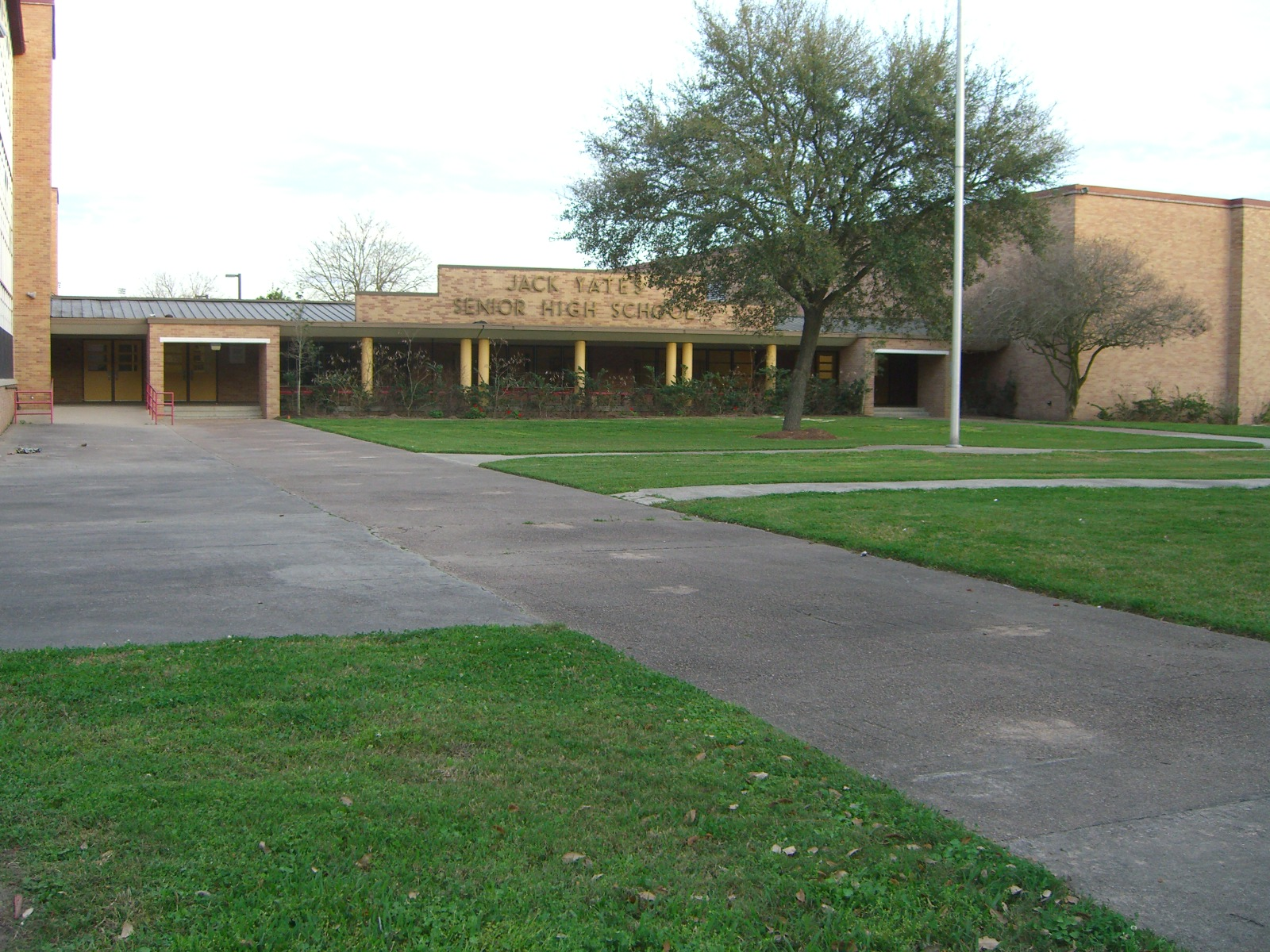
The 1958 school campus

The current Yates campus has the Crimson & Gold Café as its cafeteria, and it has eight science laboratories. The campus is located between Texas Southern University and the University of Houston.

In 2012, Richard Connelly of the Houston Press ranked the previous 1958 Yates campus as the second most architecturally beautiful high school campus in Greater Houston. Connelly said that "Some would call this generic, but we like the proud `60s style."

== Demographics ==
In 2018, the school had approximately 900 students. About 90% African-American and 10% Hispanic,

In 2010, the school had about 1,200 students. Most of them were African-American. Of the remainder, 88 were Hispanic, 7 were Asian, and 3 were White.

In the 2015–2016 school year, Yates gained over 110 students who moved from other HISD schools, while 738 high school students previously attending Yates moved to other HISD schools.

Yates had 3,600 students in the mid-1980s. In 2001, by a margin of 700 votes, the student body voted for an Asian American as Mr. Yates, reflecting an increase in non-black students in majority black schools in the Houston area.

== School uniform ==
Students at Yates are required to wear a school uniform. The Texas Education Agency specifies that the parents and/or guardians of students zoned to a school with uniforms may apply for a waiver to opt out of the uniform policy so their children do not have to wear the uniform; parents must specify "bona fide" reasons, such as religious reasons or philosophical objections.

== Academics and programs ==
In 2020, Yates became the fifth HISD high school to become an International Baccalaureate school.

Yates has HISD's magnet program for communications: broadcast TV, radio, print, and photography. Yates also houses a maritime studies magnet program.

Prior to 2015, the school allowed students who missed too many classes to pass a course but otherwise had passing grades to do cleaning work to make up for the absences. HISD asked Yates to change its policy.

== Extracurricular activities ==
=== Athletics ===
Yates competes in several sports, but the most prominent and successful sport on campus is boys' basketball. In 1994 Andrew W. Miracle, the author of Lessons of the Locker Room: The Myth of School Sports, wrote that the athletics programs at Yates High School have the same kind of importance in the Third Ward as the athletics programs at rural Texas high schools do for their respective small town and rural communities.

In the segregation era, Yates did not play games against white high schools. It was a part of the Prairie View Interscholastic League, an all-black sports league, from 1940 until 1968. In 1969 the Prairie View League was dissolved and Yates joined the University Interscholastic League (UIL).

In February 2012, Yates was reclassified as a UIL 3A school, down from the 4A level.

==== Basketball ====
In 2010, Paul Knight of the Houston Press reported that, "no high school basketball team in the state and perhaps the country has played better than Yates." As of 2010, only two of the players on the basketball team were not from the Third Ward.

In March 2010, Yates' boys basketball team was ranked number one in the nation by USA Today having defeated their opponents by margins of 135, 115, 99 (twice), 98, 90 and 88 points. On January 6, 2010, the basketball team defeated Class 4A District 21 opponent Lee High School (now Wisdom High School) 170–35, setting the state record for points in a game and sparking a debate in the process. Despite a 100-12 halftime lead, the Lions stayed true to their pressing and trapping style, which did not sit well with Lee head coach Jacques Armant.

Jacques Armant, the basketball coach at Lee High, criticized the mass scoring, saying that it could cause violence. ESPN writer Rick Reilly criticized Yates basketball Coach Greg Wise and stated "At the very least, USA Today ought to remove Yates from its national rankings—the school is No. 1—as a statement about basic sports decency."

As of 2015, Jack Yates boys' basketball program has won four state titles since the 2009 season.

==== Football ====
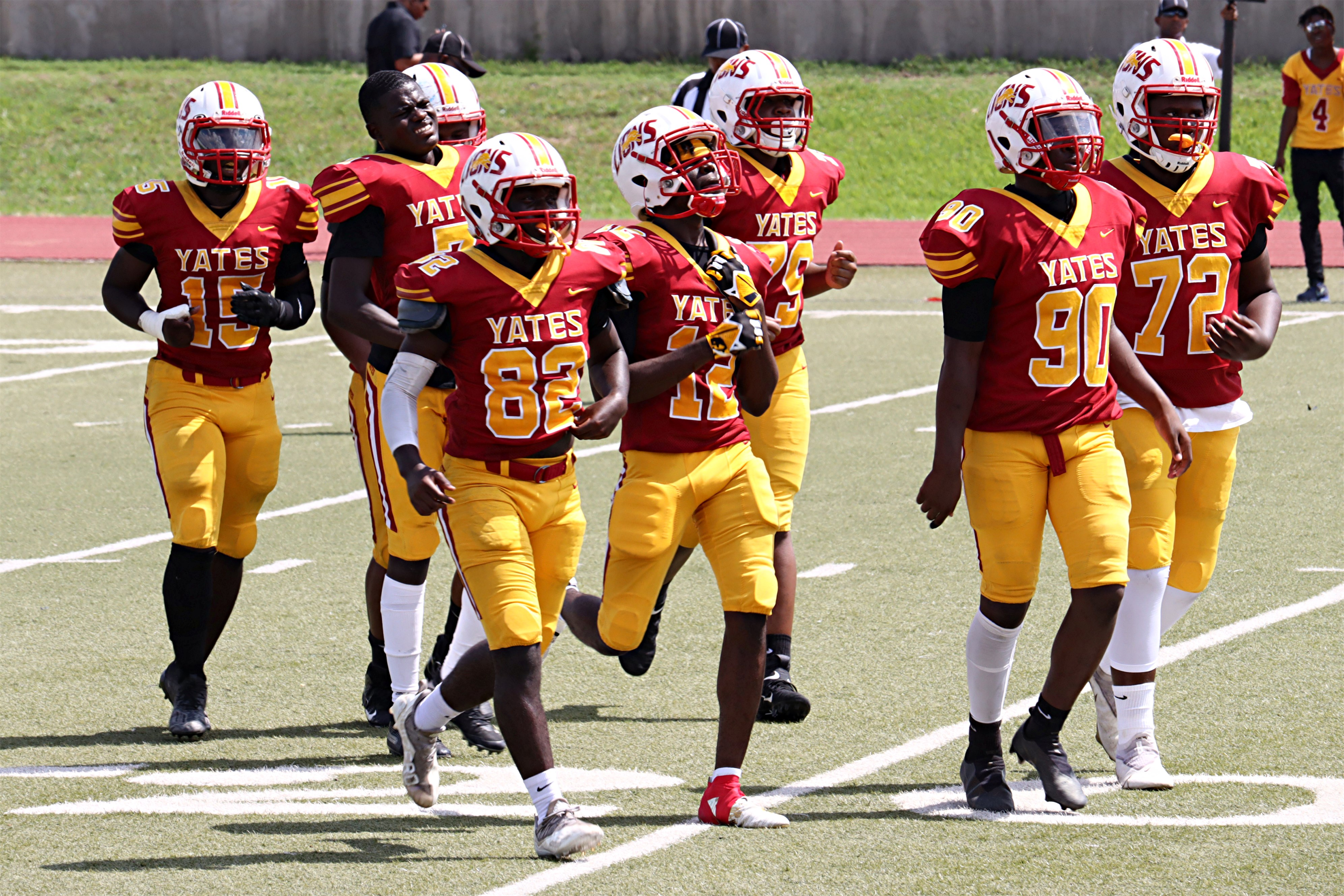
Yates football players during a game in 2021

In the segregation era schools for blacks played their games on weekdays while schools for whites played their games on Fridays.

In 1939, Yates coach Andrew "Pat" Patterson asked principal William S. Holland to meet with E. B. Evans, the president of Prairie View A&M University, to discuss regulating football played by black schools and establishing a football league for them. The Prairie View Leagues established a football league in 1940 and Yates was in this league until 1968. Rick Sherrod, author of Texas High School Football Dynasties, described Patterson as the "architect" of the PVIL football league.

Historically the football game between Yates and Wheatley High School was among the most prominent ones in the United States. Beginning in 1927, each Thanksgiving Day the school's football team played Yates High School's football team at the Jeppeson Stadium. The Yates-Wheatley Thanksgiving football match, described by On American Soil: How Justice Became a Casualty of World War II author Jack Hamann as "the most important noncollege football game in the country", often had crowds that had over 30,000 people. The rivalry declined after Yates joined the UIL, and after the football leagues integrated the Thanksgiving Day Yates-Wheatley game ended.

Coach Patterson, while in the PVIL league, had a 73.2% win record, 200-64-9, and his team received four state titles from PVIL.

Yates lost to Lake Highlands High School in the 1981 Texas state football championship game. The principal of Yates stated that a "positive atmosphere" occurred in the Third Ward despite the loss since Yates had gotten to the championships.

Yates won the 1985 Texas 5-A football championship game at Texas Stadium in Irving, defeating Odessa Permian.

In 1994, the head football coach of Yates stated that "You cannot deny that football affects the community in a big way."

== Feeder patterns ==
Elementary schools that feed into Yates include:

- Blackshear
- Foster
- Hartsfield
- Lockhart

(partial)

- J. P. Henderson
- Peck
- Thompson
- Whidby

Portions of Cullen Middle School's attendance zone, including portions formerly zoned to Ryan Middle School, feed into Yates.

== Notable alumni ==
- Debbie Allen – Class of 1967; actress
- Harold Bailey – former NFL football player for the Houston Oilers
- Johnny Bailey – Class of 1986; former NFL football player for the Chicago Bears, Arizona Cardinals, and St. Louis Rams.
- Michelle Barnes – artist and arts administrator
- Aubrey Beavers – former NFL football player for the Miami Dolphins and New York Jets.
- Jewel Brown – jazz singer with Louis Armstrong in the 1960s.
- Grady Cavness – former NFL football player for the Denver Broncos and Atlanta Falcons.
- Garnet Coleman – Class of 1979; state representative for District 147 in Houston.
- Albert Collins – Blues guitarist and singer.
- Alex Davis – basketball player
- Alphonse Dotson – former NFL football player for the Kansas City Chief, Oakland Raiders and Miami Dolphins.
- Damyean Dotson – NBA player
- Santana Dotson – Class of 1987; former NFL football player and member of the 1996 Super Bowl Champion (XXXI) Green Bay Packers.
- Bo Farrington – former NFL football player for the Chicago Bears.

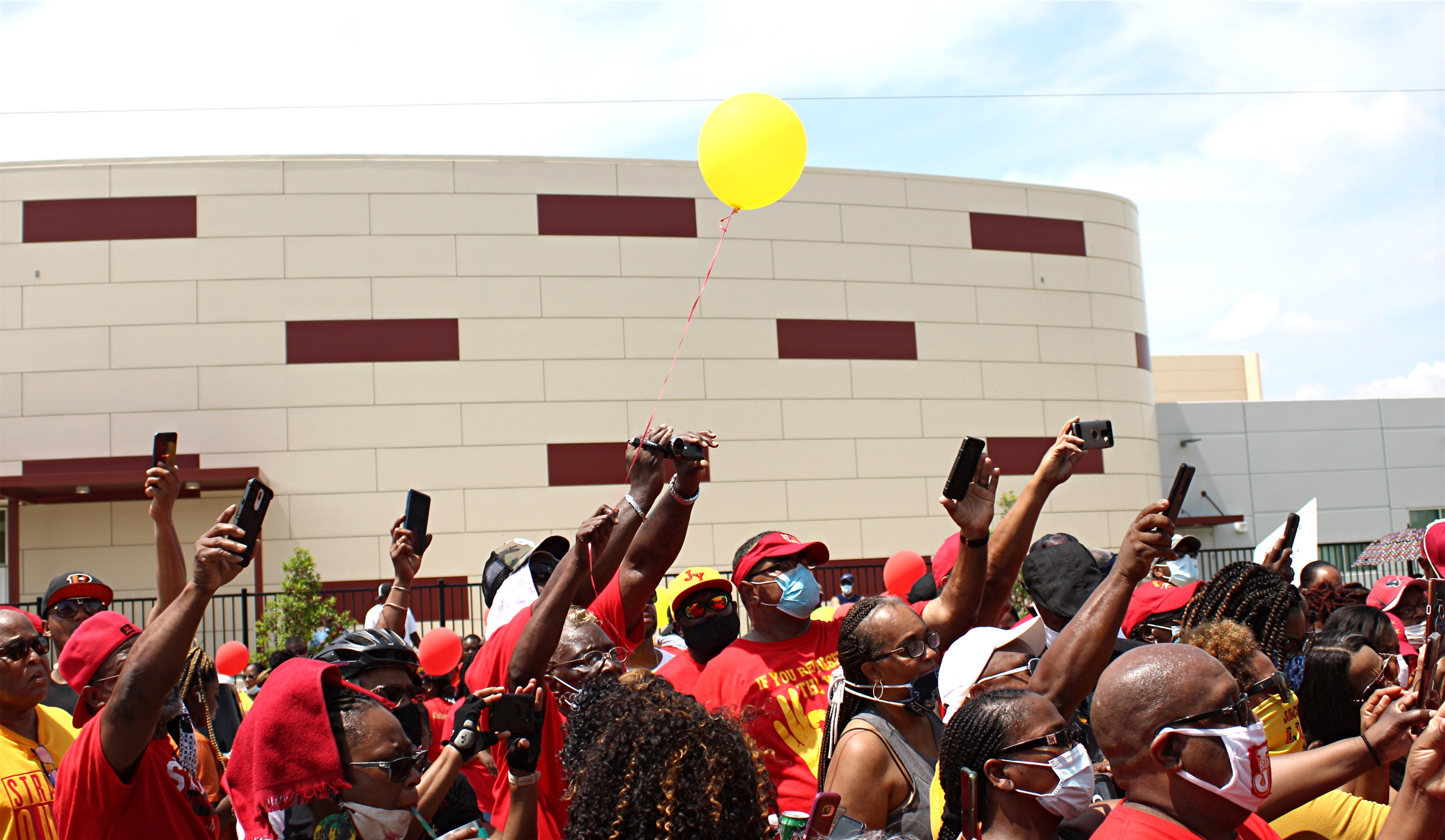
Alumni memorial in front of the school for George Floyd on May 30, 2020

- George Floyd – Class of 1993; African-American man killed on May 25, 2020, by an officer of the Minneapolis Police Department, sparking national outrage and large protests
- Albert Fontenot – former NFL football player for the Chicago Bears, Indianapolis Colts, and San Diego Chargers.
- Steve Henderson – former Major League Baseball (MLB) player
- Booker Huffman – professional wrestler better known as Booker T
- Andrew L. Jefferson Jr. – Texas attorney and judge
- Conrad O. Johnson – jazz saxophonist and leader of the Conrad Johnson Orchestra.
- Monica Lamb-Powell – Class of 1983; former member of the Houston Comets
- Orie Lemon – NFL football player
- Mike Lewis – former NFL football player for the Atlanta Falcons and Green Bay Packers.
- Dexter Manley – Class of 1977; former NFL football player and member of the 1982 Super Bowl Champion [XVII] Washington Redskins.
- Louise Martin – photographer
- Roland S. Martin – journalist
- McCoy McLemore – former NBA player and broadcaster for the Houston Rockets.
- Robert Miller – former NFL running back for the Minnesota Vikings (1975–1980).
- Jerald Moore – former NFL player (St. Louis Rams, Oakland Raiders, New Orleans Saints); All Big Eight University Of Oklahoma, Jack Yates all-time leading rusher in yards and touchdowns
- Big Moe (Kenneth Moore) – rapper
- Elvis Patterson – former NFL football player and two-time Super Bowl Champion (XXI, XXVIII).
- Reggie Phillips – former NFL football player and Super Bowl XX champion. Appeared in the Chicago Bears Super Bowl Shuffle video.
- Phylicia Rashad – Class of 1966; actress, known for her role as Clair Huxtable on The Cosby Show
- John Roper – Class of 1984; Former NFL football Player for the Chicago Bears, Dallas Cowboys, and Philadelphia Eagles.
- Gloria Randle Scott (graduated in 1955), educator
- Damion Square – current NFL player for the San Diego Chargers
- Hobart Taylor Jr. – Executive Vice Chairman of the President's Committee on Equal Employment Opportunities, Special Counsel to President Lyndon Johnson. and director of the Export–Import Bank of the United States
- Robyn Troup – American singer
- Rickie Winslow – Class of 1983; former NBA basketball player
- Joe Young – Class of 2010; Former NBA player for the Indiana Pacers
- Michael Young – Class of 1980; former NBA player for the Phoenix Suns, Philadelphia 76ers, and Los Angeles Clippers; former Houston Cougars men's basketball player and member of Phi Slama Jama; director of basketball operations and performance enhancement at the University of Houston

== See also ==
- History of the African-Americans in Houston
