= Bill Troop =

Bill Troop an American writer, photography specialist, and type designer. He is the principal author of "The Film Developing Cookbook", in print continuously since 1998, and widely considered to be the standard contemporary work on black and white film processing and chemistry. An expanded 2nd edition was published in November 2019 and a French translation was published in 2021.

As a chemist, he has designed products for Photographers' Formulary, Inc., including TF-4, the first alkaline fixer for black and white film and papers to be sold, and TD-3, a film developer which was reported to provide superior speed and dynamic range and lower grain in the category of low contrast film developers designed for high contrast films such as Kodak Technical Pan and similar. TF-4's use as a helpful adjunct to tanning developers was discussed in detail by Gordon Hutchings in "The Book of Pyro" Alkaline fixing for black and white silver halide films and printing papers was considered revolutionary when Troop introduced it. Though still controversial, it has since become a recognized technique in photographic processing as it offers reduced washing times, increased archival stability, and reduced environmental impact. Troop published the first formulas for alkaline fixers, and several manufacturers now produce them.

He has written for several computer magazines, including PC Magazine, Macworld, MacWEEK, and MacDirectory. His 1993 article "Silicon Valley IDE mirror card: safety in numbers" described the then-revolutionary first RAID product available for personal computers.

The Wall Street Journal has described him as a "kitchen-appliance junkie" and he has written about kitchen technology for The Lady (magazine).

He has designed several typefaces for Canada Type, including Busted, Didot Display, Didot Headline, and Semplicità Pro. Earlier typefaces were released through the now-defunct foundry Precision Type, and he has worked for Adobe and Monotype.

He was married to the writer Elspeth Barker from 2007 to 2013 and is reported to be working on a novel.
