= Troupe =

Troupe may refer to:

== General ==
- Comedy troupe, a group of comedians
- Dance troupe, a group of dancers
  - Fire troupe, a group of fire dancers
- Troupe system, a method of playing role-playing games
- Theatrical troupe, a group of theatrical performers

== People with the surname Troupe ==
- Ben Troupe (born 1982), American football player
- Quincy Troupe (born 1939), American poet and journalist
- Ron Troupe, a fictional journalist in the Superman comics
- Tom Troupe (1928–2025), American actor and journalist

== See also ==
- List of dance companies
- List of improvisational theatre companies
- Troup (disambiguation)
