= Jeff Merrow =

American football player (born 1953)

No. 75
- Position: Defensive end

Personal information
- Born: July 12, 1953 (age 73); Akron, Ohio, U.S.
- Listed height: 6 ft 4 in (1.93 m)
- Listed weight: 236 lb (107 kg)

Career information
- High school: Firestone (Akron, Ohio)
- College: West Virginia
- NFL draft: 1975: 11th round, 263rd overall pick

Career history
- Atlanta Falcons (1975–1983)

Career NFL statistics
- GP / GS: 108 / 100
- Sacks: 37.5
- FR: 5
- Stats at Pro Football Reference

Jeffrey Colin Merrow (born July 12, 1953) is a former defensive end who played nine seasons in the National Football League (NFL) for the Atlanta Falcons as a member of their famed Grits Blitz defense. He played collegiately for the West Virginia Mountaineers.

== Collegiate career ==
Jeff Merrow enrolled at West Virginia University in 1972, and as a freshman, he recorded his lone interception. As a sophomore one year later, he led head coach Bobby Bowden's defense with 141 tackles (15 for a loss), six sacks, and a fumble recovery. In his junior season, 1974, Merrow recorded 134 tackles (seven for a loss), three sacks and two fumble recoveries.

== Professional career ==
Merrow was drafted by the Atlanta Falcons in the 1975 NFL draft in the 11th round, 263rd overall. In 1975, his rookie season, Merrow played in and started 12 games. From 1976 to 1978, he played and started in 14 games each season. In 1977, he was part of the so-called Grits Blitz defense, widely considered to be one of the greatest of all time. In 1979, Merrow played in only three games due to an injury that cut short his season. One year later, he started all 16 games in a season for the first time in his career. In 1982, Merrow saw action in only eight games, starting seven of them. In 1983, at age 30, he ended his professional career by playing in all 16 games, recording three sacks.

== Current ==
Merrow now lives in Buford, Georgia, where he owns a business that sells heavy-duty truck lifts.

Merrow's youngest son, Thor, followed in his father's footsteps, accepting a scholarship offer to play at WVU in 2005. He was a back-up tight end at the University of North Alabama under head coach Terry Bowden.
