= Robyn Troup =

American singer (born 1988)

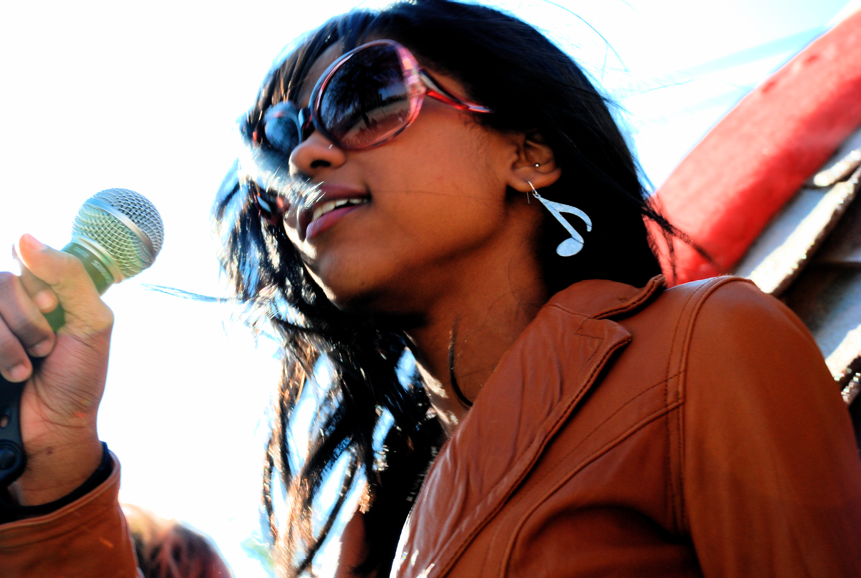

Background information
- Born: February 11, 1988 (age 38)
- Origin: Houston, Texas
- Genres: R&B, pop, soul
- Occupation: Singer
- Years active: 2007–present

Robyn Troup (born February 11, 1988, in Houston, Texas) is an American singer who was the winner of the "My Grammy Moment" contest organized by NARAS and Yahoo! Music in 2007.

Troup attended Yates High School in Houston. She is currently enrolled at University of Southern California.

She previously auditioned for American Idol Season 6 during Summer 2006. She made it past the initial site auditions to the "Hollywood" selection phase later in 2006, but was cut in the second (group) round. The episode showing this was first aired on February 13, 2007.

Since winning the "My Grammy Moment" contest, Troup has recorded a cover of "Back in Black" with Carlos Santana and rapper Nas for Santana's 2010 release, Guitar Heaven: The Greatest Guitar Classics of All Time and is currently in the studio writing and recording her full-length debut.
