= Ryan Middle School (Houston) =

School in Houston, Texas, United States

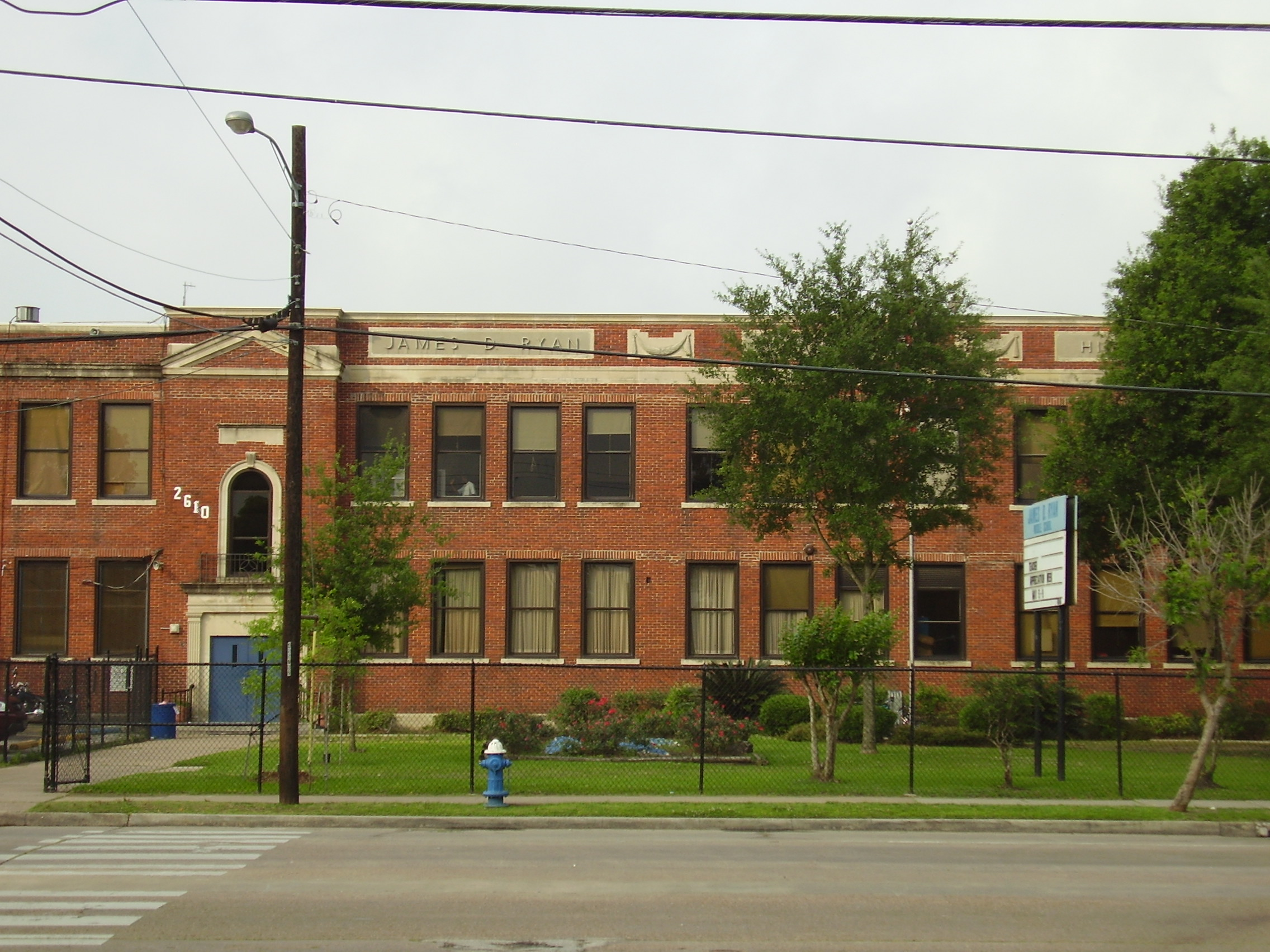
- Ryan Middle School, now the Baylor College of Medicine Academy at Ryan

Location
- 2610 Elgin Street, Houston, Texas 77004; 29.7325179°N 95.3647508°W

Information
- Other name: Baylor College of Medicine Academy at Ryan (2013–present)
- Former name: Yates Colored High School (1926–1958); Ryan Colored Junior High School (1958)
- Founded: 1958
- Closed: 2013
- Website: ms.houstonisd.org/ryanms at the Wayback Machine (archive index)
- Last updated: 29 December 2017

James D. Ryan Middle School was a secondary school located in Houston, Texas, United States. The Baylor College of Medicine Academy at Ryan, a magnet middle school, now occupies the campus.

The school, which served grades 6 through 8, is a part of the Houston Independent School District. It served much Third Ward area and a very small portion of Midtown Houston. The campus is south of Downtown Houston, and in proximity to the University of Houston.

== History ==
After Yates High School relocated from 2610 Elgin to 3703 Sampson in 1958, Ryan Colored Junior High School opened in Yates's former location. Ryan was named after the first principal of Yates High. Some older maps referred to the school as Yates Junior High School.

Allan Turner of the Houston Chronicle said that the building served as an "educational anchor" for the Third Ward as many professionals in the Third Ward community such as educators, ministers, and lawyers received education in it. Since Ryan's beginning, Turner said that the school's fortunes had risen and fallen as time passed.

The HISD school board forced Yates principal William S. Holland to stay at Ryan Middle School instead of moving onto the new Yates, and a petition from the community did not succeed in changing this.

The school opened as a school only for African-Americans; it was desegregated by 1970.

Beginning in 1988 Chase Enterprises subsidiary Rangers Insurance Co. assigned employees to tutor Ryan students, funded school supplies and computers for Ryan, and established a scholarship/endowment fund to provide vocational training and/or university educations to Ryan alumni who abstained from recreational drugs, did not get into legal trouble, and graduated from high school; from 1992 to 1999 166 eligible Ryan alumni benefited from the scholarship. Annually the company deposited $150,000 into the scholarship/endowment fund.

A 2008 Houston Chronicle article stated that Ryan was considered to be among the lowest performing campuses in Houston ISD. HISD staff stated that the district needed signing bonuses in order to convince employees to take positions at Ryan Middle School. During that year, principal Cimberli Johnson was fired because she socially promoted 25 students and issued about $70,800 in paychecks not earned by employees.

Michael McKenzie began his term as principal of Ryan in June 2010. He was previously the principal of a charter school, WALIPP Prep, and was a part of the Apollo 20 program, used to improve under-performing schools. He stated that he was required to keep working with the same assistant principals and counselors who were there prior to the start of his term and that he was not permitted to replace them.

After two employees made complaints against McKenzie, an investigation, conducted by HISD's Equal Employment Opportunity office, concluded that he acquired furniture from another employee's office to use in his own office and that he had used profane language during two staff meetings. The investigation also concluded that he made a remark stating that he did not want a homosexual male employee around children due to his sexuality and another stating that he wanted a black male to serve as the assistant principal of the school. McKenzie, a black man, disputed the findings that he made the comments of racial and sexual natures, and he added that he returned the furniture to the employee after initially believing it was HISD property. He accused those filing complaints against him of exhibiting bias towards the principal before him. He filed a complaint against that office of HISD with the federal authorities. He resigned in 2011, after one year of work.

=== Closure ===
From 2002 to 2012, the student population fell 70%, from 830 students to 265 students. A proposal to close Ryan Middle School was submitted to the HISD board. If Ryan closed at that time, its students would have been divided between Attucks, Cullen, Dowling, Lanier, and Pershing middle schools. Dallas Dance, the chief of middle schools of HISD, stated that Ryan had 570 middle school-aged students zoned to the campus, but fewer than half of those students chose to attend Ryan. Dance said that over the previous five-year period, HISD had already invested an additional $438,000 per year into Ryan.

Parents and community leaders protested the proposed closure. A group of parents threatened to occupy the campus if HISD had it closed temporarily. On Monday May 7, 2012 the board removed the proposed closure of Ryan from its agenda.

In its final year of operation, there were 263 students at the school, including 182 students in the 6th and 7th grades, making it the smallest middle school in HISD. In March 2013 the district board voted 5-3 to close Ryan. Plans were to rezone the students to Cullen Middle School, 4 miles (6.4 km) from Ryan. The closure occurred even though the NAACP and members of the Third Ward community opposed the closure.

In 2013, Ryan Middle School's campus reopened as the Baylor College of Medicine Academy at Ryan, a magnet middle school for medical studies. The school is intended to feed into the Michael E. DeBakey High School for the Health Professions.

For the 2013–2014 school year, 119 of the students who attended Ryan during the 6th or 7th grades during the 2012–2013 school year, or 65% of the total of the 2012–2013 6th and 7th grade students, started attending Cullen Middle School. The remaining students began attending other schools.

== Neighborhoods served by the former Ryan Middle School ==
Several Third Ward area subdivisions, including University Oaks, Oak Manor, University Woods, Washington Terrace, and Riverside Terrace were previously zoned to Ryan Middle School. In addition, the old Ryan Middle School served a small portion of Midtown Houston (the portion south of U.S. Route 59) and a small portion of Neartown.

Cuney Homes and Ewing Apartments, units of public housing, were zoned to Ryan Middle School.

Project Row Houses were zoned to Ryan.

Residents of the Texas Medical Center (TMC)'s Laurence H. Favrot Tower Apartments, which housed TMC employees and their dependents, were zoned to Ryan. On August 31, 2012 the complex closed.

== School uniforms ==
For portions of its history, the school required its students to wear uniforms.

Beginning in 2010 the former Ryan Middle School required male students to wear ties. Richard Connelly of the Houston Press stated that ties could be used as weapons in fights, since an assailant could grab his victim using his tie. As of 2012 the school still required male students to wear ties.

== Student body ==
During its final school year, Ryan Middle had 272 students. 84% were black, 15% were Hispanic, and the remainder were of other races.

During the 2006–2007 school year, the school had 633 pupils

- 85% African American
- 14% Hispanic American
- Less than 1% White American
- Less than 1% Asian American
- Less than 1% Native Americans

About 80% of the students qualified for free or reduced lunch.

== Feeder patterns ==
The following elementary schools fed into the former Ryan Middle School:

- Lockhart
- Turner

(partial)

- Blackshear,
- Dodson
- MacGregor
- Peck
- Poe
- Roberts

Three different high schools had zoning boundaries that partially coincided with the former Ryan Middle School boundary:

- Yates High School
- Lamar High School
- Bellaire High School

== Notable students ==
- George Floyd, a black man who was murdered during an arrest that caused protests and popularized Black Lives Matter

== See also ==
- History of the African-Americans in Houston

Preceded by Blackshear, Lockhart, Turner, Dodson, J. P. Henderson, J. Will Jones, MacGregor, Peck, Poe, Roberts	Houston Independent School District; Grades 6–8	Succeeded by Yates, Bellaire, Lamar
