= Troop Sport =

Clothing company

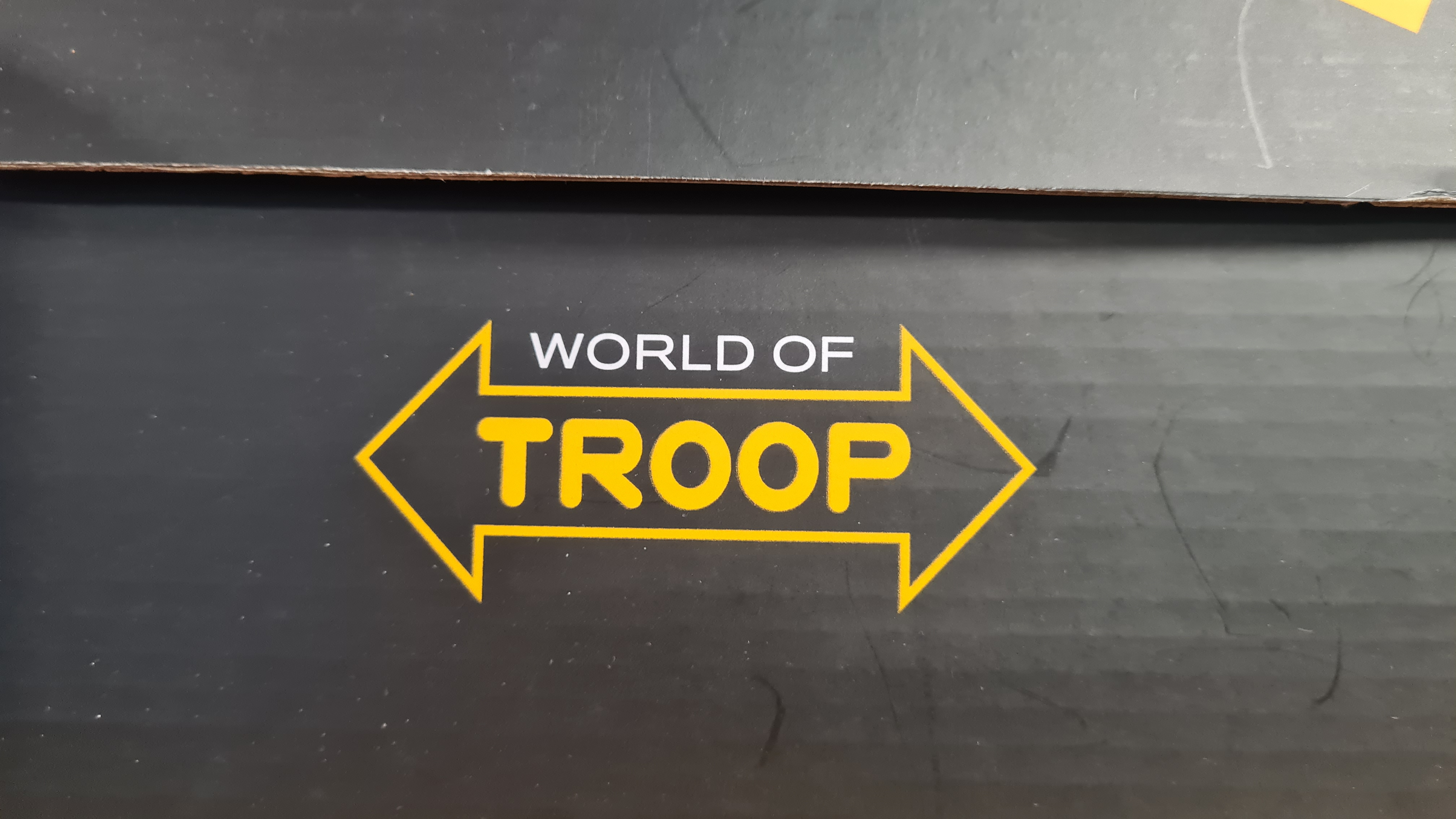
- Industry: Apparel
- Founded: 1985; 41 years ago
- Founders: Teddy Held; Harvey Held; William Kim
- Website: worldoftroop.com worldoftroop.eu

Troop Sport primarily known as World Of Troop or just TROOP is a clothing company founded in 1985 by two brothers, Teddy and Harvey Held, and William Kim. The clothing line was intended to target young men in urban areas, heavily inspired by hiphop culture such as breakdance, graffiti, DJ-ing and rap.

As popularity rose, Troop began producing full lines of sportswear and athletic shoes. Apparel wise, Troop’s most popular items were their distinctive leather Troop jackets, which were available in an array of styles and colors. On the footwear side, the brand’s early designs like the Ice Lamb, Mercedes and Pro Edition were very popular within the New York fashion scene. Soon, World Of Troop was on the radar of other major brands and began to grow rapidly outside of NYC and up and down the East Coast to Nationwide. Soon after, the brand would quickly expand Worldwide by the end of 1989.

Currently the brand is making collections again in both the US and Europe, with the same Hiphop DNA but for a modern audience, investing recourses in athletes such as skateboarders, Bmxers and Breakdancers but also Graffiti artists to support the elements of hiphop that was the foundation of the brand back in 1985.

== Controversies ==
The company had its reputation hurt after rumors spread that company was actually owned by the Ku Klux Klan (similar rumors have been made about popular companies such as drink company Snapple, shoe company Timberland and cigarette company Marlboro), and that the name stood for "To Rule Over Oppressed People." Additional rumors claimed that rapper LL Cool J appeared on "The Oprah Winfrey Show" urging viewers to protest the company.

The rumors about the connection to the Klan hurt sales and the company declared bankruptcy several years later. These rumors were categorically false, with Held saying that they were "blackmail" from competition. By the early 90s, Troop was gone from the American market, although it enjoyed a longer life in Europe throughout the 90s through a licensee.

The brand exchanged ownership numerous times through comeback attempts and licensee deals in the early 2000s, and in 2008, Grammy Award winning artist Nelly obtained the TROOP apparel license. In 2014, the brand was purchased outright and the brand has been relaunched in 2015. The brand has reissued T-shirts and original leather jackets in addition to the footwear.
