= Baylor College of Medicine Academy at Ryan =

Magnet middle school in Houston, Texas

Coordinates: 29.7324°N 95.3629°W

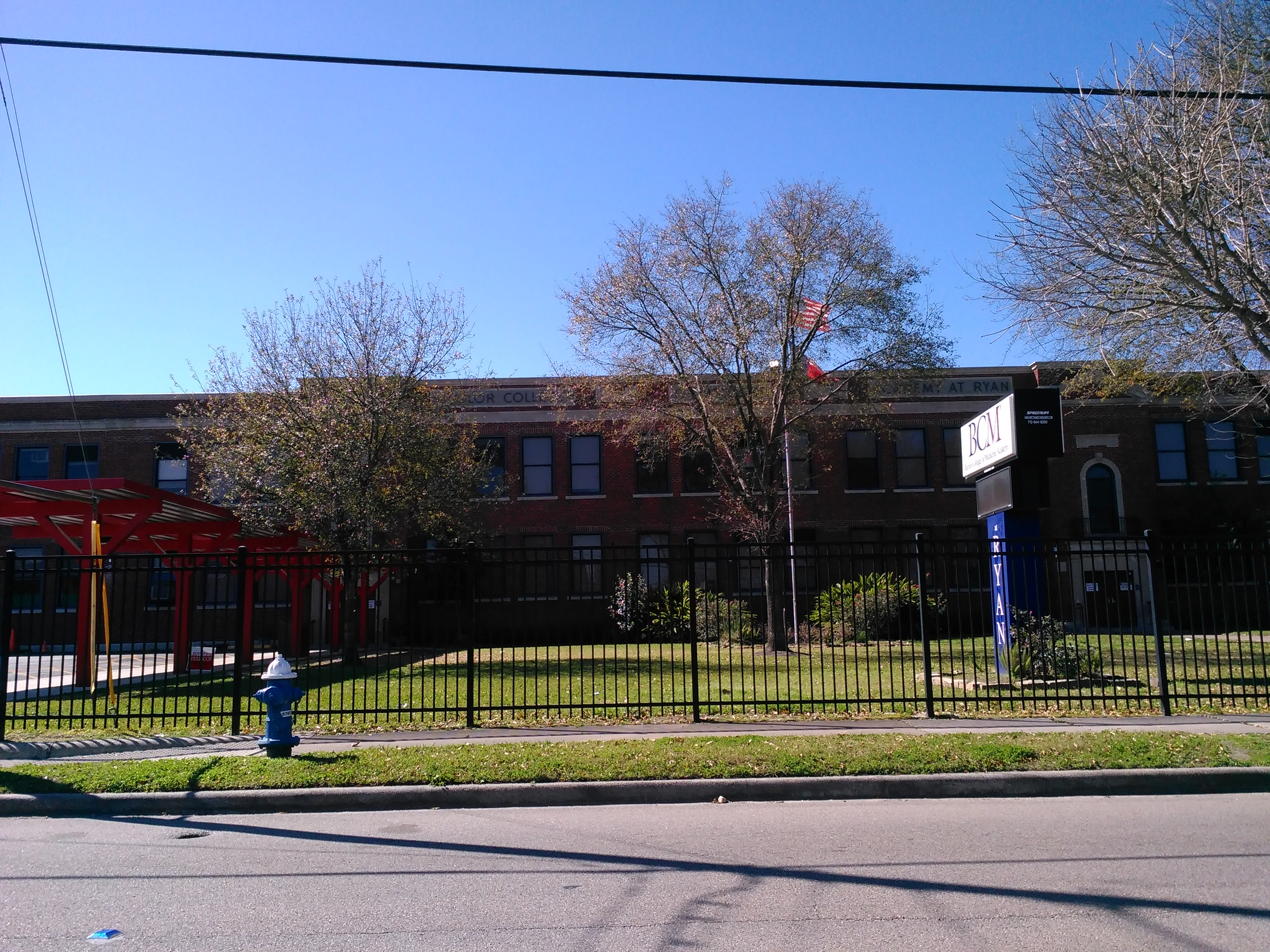

Information
- Established: 2013; 13 years ago
- Affiliation: Baylor College of Medicine
- Website: ryan.houstonisd.org

Baylor College of Medicine Academy at Ryan (BCMAR) is a magnet middle school in Houston Independent School District (HISD), located in the Third Ward, Houston, Texas. It is located in the former Ryan Middle School. It is in association with the Baylor College of Medicine. It is south of Downtown Houston, A press release stated that the school was to be modeled after the Michael E. DeBakey High School for Health Professions.

== History ==
On April 11, 2012 the HISD board voted to establish the school. The HISD board approved the conversion of the Ryan Middle School building into a magnet school. Jyoti Malhan was selected as the founding principal of the school.

The goal was to have at least 100 6th grade students upon its opening. Malhan used her own cell phone to personally recruit students to BCM Ryan. The school received 450 applications even though it had not yet been established; the lottery admissions process selected 250 of them. 70 students from District IV, the feeder pattern for the former Ryan Middle School, applied to BCM Ryan for that school year. This included 22 from Whidby Elementary, including 19 from Blackshear Elementary, 14 from Lockhart Elementary, 9 from Codwell Elementary, 4 from Peck Elementary, and 1 from MacGregor Elementary.

For its first year the school admitted 250 students. 11% of the students accepted to the school for the 2013-2014 school year lived in the former Ryan Middle School attendance zone. 28 of the District IV were accepted, including 10 from Lockhart, 6 from Blackshear, 5 from Whidby, 3 from Codwell, 2 from Peck, and one each from MacGregor and Thompson. The school accepted 19 students who attended charter elementary schools or private elementary schools. Based on the data, Jeffrey L. Boney of the Houston Forward Times, a black newspaper, argued that residents of the surrounding Third Ward area were being shortchanged.

Of the 250 original 6th graders, after the end of the first year 16 were expelled and sent back their zoned schools due to low academic performance. 69 of the original 250 had received academic probation during their first year. By 2015 the school covered grade 7 and the student body increased to 480. At that time it had a wait list of 900 students, and in 2015 almost 1,800 students applied to attend the school. Jennifer Radcliffe of the Houston Chronicle stated that the school, which had been ranked as the 6th best middle school in HISD, as "a rare success story among open-enrollment middle schools" in the school district.

Beginning in 2018 the school also serves as a boundary option for students zoned to Blackshear, Lockhart, and MacGregor elementary schools. The HISD board voted unanimously for this change.

== Admissions ==
BCMA at Ryan uses a lottery, instead of academic performance, as the basis for admissions. This is due to the federal grant for magnet schools used by BCMA at Ryan requiring this kind of admissions process. Therefore, incoming 6th graders have varying levels of academic abilities.

Students zoned to Lockhart, Blackshear, and MacGregor elementary schools may attend BCMA at Ryan without going through the lottery.

== Demographics ==
In 2015 the school had 480 students; 45% were Hispanic and Latino, 30% were black, and Anglo Whites and Asians made up the remainder. The elementary schools sending the largest numbers of students to BCM Ryan, as of that year, were Lockhart in the Third Ward and Roberts in Southgate, and 95 other elementary schools had students moving on to BCM Ryan.

As of the 2013-2014 school year, 47% of the students were Hispanic and Latino, 35% were Black, 9% were White, and 9% were Asian.

== School uniforms ==
BCM Academy at Ryan requires its students to wear school uniforms. Students are required to wear navy or burgundy shirts with the BCMA logo embroidered with khaki pants, shorts or skirts. Shorts and skirts must be knee length. Students are allowed to wear spirit shirts or college shirts with jeans. Students must wear belts and shirts must be tucked in. Hoodies are not permitted.
