= Speck (disambiguation) =

Speck is a German word for various forms of meat fat, generally for culinary use.

Speck may also refer to:

- Speck (cipher), a family of lightweight block ciphers
- Speck (printing), a manuscript produced with low effort
- Speck (surname), including a list of people with the name
- Speck Products, a maker of cases for consumer electronics
- "Speck" (Space Ghost Coast to Coast), a television episode
- Speck the Altar Boy, a syndicated gag cartoon also known as An Altar Boy Named Speck

== See also ==
- Spec (disambiguation)
- SPEC (disambiguation)
