= Spec =

Spec may refer to:

- Specification (technical standard), an explicit set of requirements to be satisfied by a material, product, or service
  - datasheet, or "spec sheet"
- Specialist resp. Specialization

== People ==
- Spec Harkness (1887-1952), American professional baseball pitcher
- Spec Keene (1894-1977), American college football, baseball and basketball coach
- Spec O'Donnell (1911-1986), American film actor
- Spec Richardson (1922-2016), former general manager of the Houston Astros Major League Baseball team
- Spec Sanders (1919-2003), American National Football League and All-America Football Conference player
- Spec Shea (1920–2002), American Major League Baseball pitcher

== Science and technology ==
- spec, an antibiotic resistance gene against spectinomycin
- Spectrum of a ring, a mathematical structure often written as Spec(R)
- Specifier (linguistics), in syntax
- Short for speculative evolution

== SPEC ==
- Standard Performance Evaluation Corporation, an organization that produces benchmarks
- Hampton Inn Court at the Steinke Physical Education Center (SPEC), a Texas A&M University basketball and volleyball arena
- Solid phase extraction chromatography

== Other uses ==
- Speculation, the purchase of an asset with the hope that it will become more valuable in the near future
- Spec, Virginia, United States, an unincorporated community
- Columbia Daily Spectator, a student newspaper nicknamed the Spec

== See also ==
- Specs (disambiguation)
- Spec racing
- Spec script
- Spec's Music, a defunct South Florida-based retail music and video rental chain
- Spec's Wine, Spirits & Finer Foods, a Texas-based liquor store chain
