= Specialism =

Specialism may refer to:

- School specialism, a subject that a British school specialises in; see Specialist schools in the United Kingdom
- Academic specialism, an academic field that a college or university specialises in
- Military specialism

== See also ==
- Specialization (disambiguation)
- Specialist (disambiguation)
