= Speck (surname) =

Speck is a surname of multiple origins, primarily of German origin from the German word meaning "bacon" for a pork butcher or bacon seller (occupational surname), or as a nickname for a fat person; or from the word meaning "log road" (topographic surname), or from any places named Speck or similar (toponymic surname). Notable people with the surname include:

- Angela Speck, British astrophysicist
- Bill Speck (1896–1969), Canadian ice hockey player
- Christa Speck (1942–2013), German model and actress
- Cliff Speck (born 1956), American baseball pitcher
- Doug Speck (1947–2010), American track and field publicist
- Dutch Speck (1886–1952), American football player
- Edmond Speck (1886–1959), Australian politician
- Eva Speck, Swiss slalom canoeist
- Frank Speck (1881–1950), American anthropologist and academic
- Fred Speck (1947–2011), Canadian ice hockey player
- George Speck (1824–1914), American chef
- Henry Speck (1908–1971), Canadian Tlawit'sis painter, carver and dancer
- Hermann Ritter von Speck (1888–1940), German Wehrmacht general
- Jacques Speck (1931–1971), Luxembourgish footballer
- Jeff Speck, American city planner and author
- Karl Friedrich Speck (1862–1939), German politician
- Larry Speck, American architect and academic
- Len Speck (born 1929), Canadian ice hockey player
- Leslie Speck (1913–2004), American college football coach
- Mike Speck, American Gospel musician and ordained minister
- Meredith Speck (born 1993), American soccer player
- Nahuel Speck (born 1997), Argentine footballer
- Nancy Speck, American hematologist
- Oskar Speck (1907–1993), German canoeist and adventurer
- Richard Speck (1941–1991), American mass murderer
- Robert Speck (handball) (1909–1979), Romanian field handball player
- Robert Speck (politician) (1915–1972), Canadian mayor
- Ross Speck (1927–2015), American psychiatrist, psychoanalyst and family therapist
- Sam Speck (born 1937), American politician from Ohio
- Walt Speck (1896–1979), American painter.
- Wieland Speck (born 1951), German film director
- W. A. Speck (1938–2017), British historian
- Zsa Zsa Speck (real name: Perry Pandrea), American keyboardist

Fictional characters:

- Tommy Speck, fictional character

== See also ==
- Will Speck and Josh Gordon, American film duo
- Hermann Speck von Sternburg (1852–1908), German diplomat and art collector
- Speck (disambiguation)
