= Specs =

Specs may refer to:

- Specification (disambiguation)
- Spectacles

== People ==
- Specs Clark (1889-1943), American pre-Negro league baseball player
- Specs Ellis, American former Negro league pitcher
- Specs Powell (1922-2007), American jazz drummer and percussionist
- Specs Howard (born 1926), American radio pioneer
- Specs Roberts (1908-?), American former Negro league pitcher
- Specs Toporcer (1899-1989), American Major League Baseball player and executive
- Specs Wright (1927-1963), American jazz drummer

== Other uses ==
- SPECS (speed camera), a brand of speed cameras in the United Kingdom
- The Specs, an American band
- Spec's Music, a defunct American music and video rental chain
- SPECS Sport, an Indonesian sports equipment company
- Spec's Wine, Spirits & Finer Foods, an American liquor store chain
- Specs Doc, a fictional character from the animated series Lamput

== See also ==
- Spex (disambiguation)
- Spec (disambiguation)
