= Rich's =

Rich's may refer to:

- Rich's (department store), a department store chain that later became part of Macy's
- Rich's (discount store), a discount store chain which ceased operations in 1996
- ReBar Houston; formerly Rich's Houston, LGBT+ restaurant and club in Houston, Texas
- Rich Products, an American food products company also known as Rich's
