= Spex =

Spex or SPEX may refer to:

- Variation of specs, colloquial abbreviation of specifications or spectacles

== Entertainment ==
- Spex (magazine), a German magazine
- Spex (theatre), a kind of amateur theatre performed by university students in Sweden and Finland

== Industry and technology ==
- Spex Design Corporation, kit car manufacturer
- Spex (solar park), a solar park in Spain
- SPEX (astronomy), a Dutch space science project

== See also ==
- Specs (disambiguation)
