= Nahuel Speck =

Argentine footballer

Personal information
- Full name: Carlos Nahuel Speck
- Date of birth: 16 May 1997 (age 29)
- Place of birth: Termas de Río Hondo, Argentina
- Position: Left midfielder

Youth career
- Gimnasia LP

Senior career*
Years	Team	Apps	(Gls)
2018–2021	Atlético de Rafaela	1	(0)
2019	→ Libertad (loan)	9	(1)
2020	→ 9 de Julio (loan)	3	(0)
2020	→ Unión Sunchales (loan)	4	(0)
2021	→ Carcarañá (loan)	6	(3)
2021	Sportivo Las Parejas	17	(5)
2022	Güemes	6	(0)
2022	Sarmiento de Resistencia	5	(0)
2023	Crucero del Norte	7	(0)
- * Club domestic league appearances and goals as of 19:44, 19 July 2023 (UTC)

Carlos Nahuel Speck (born 16 May 1997) is an Argentine professional footballer who plays as a left midfielder.

== Career ==
Speck began his career in the youth system of Gimnasia y Esgrima. He departed the club in June 2018, after agreeing to sign for Primera B Nacional's Atlético de Rafaela. Having been an unused substitute in the Copa Argentina against Lanús on 22 August, Speck made his senior debut on 1 September by coming on as a substitute for Lucas Quiroz during a 1–1 draw with Sarmiento.

== Career statistics ==
As of 23 November 2018.

Club statistics
Club	Season	League			Cup (Note: Includes the Copa Argentina)		League Cup		Continental		Other		Total	
Club	Season	Division	Apps	Goals	Apps	Goals	Apps	Goals	Apps	Goals	Apps	Goals	Apps	Goals
Atlético de Rafaela	2018–19	Primera B Nacional	1	0	0	0	—		—		0	0	1	0
Career total			1	0	0	0	—		—		0	0	1	0
