= Midtown, Houston =

Neighborhood of Houston in Texas, US

Coordinates: 29.742°N 95.374°W

Midtown Houston
- Neighborhood of Houston
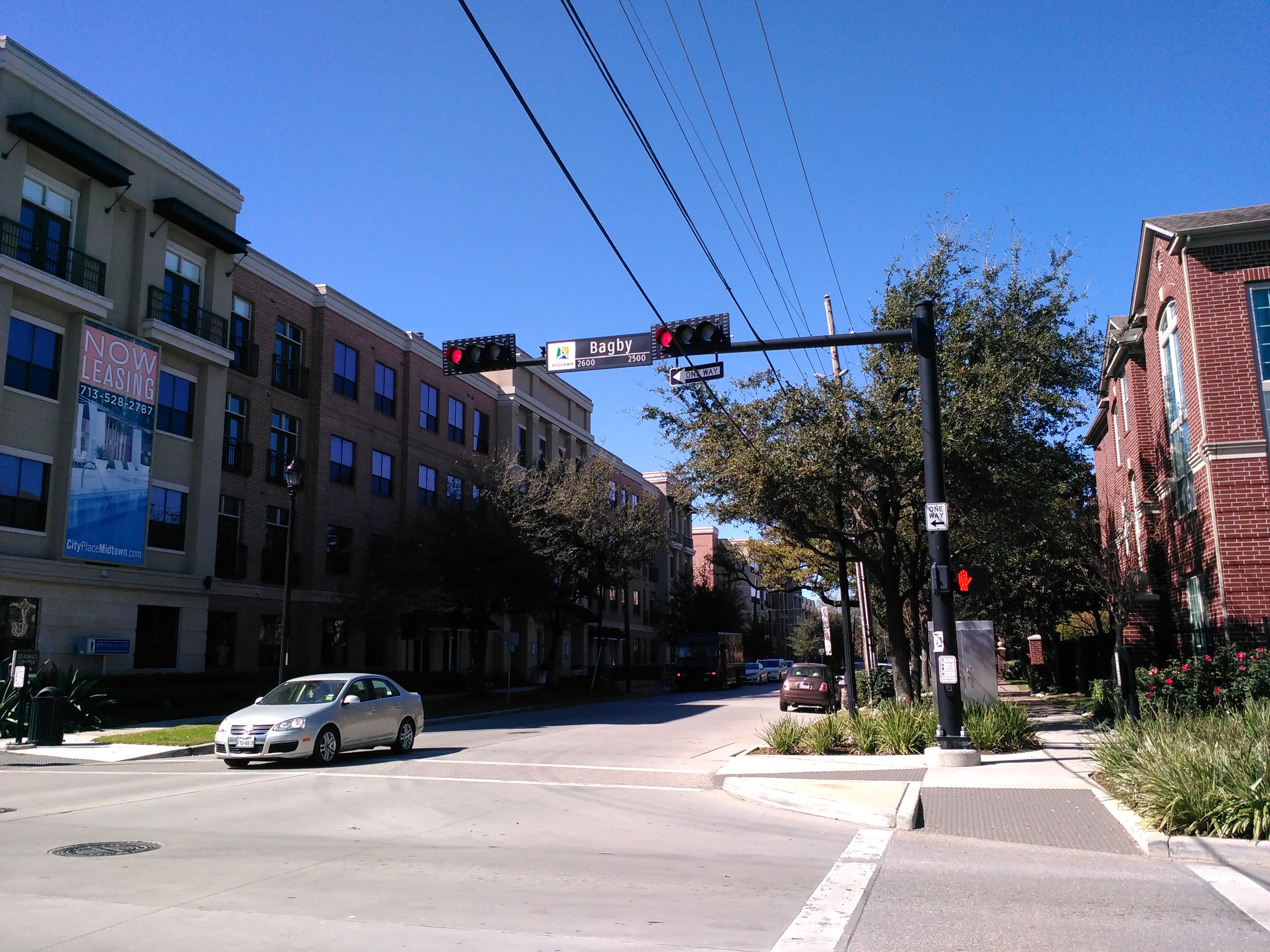
- The intersection of Bagby and McGowen streets in western Midtown

- Seal
- Interactive map of Midtown Houston
- Country: USA
- State: Texas
- County: Harris County
- City: Houston

Area
  - Total: 1.24 sq mi (3.2 km^{2})

Population (2015)
  - Total: 8,597
  - Density: 6,930/sq mi (2,680/km^{2})
- Time zone: UTC-6 (CST)
  - Summer (DST): UTC-5 (CDT)
- ZIP codes: 77002, 77004, 77006
- Area codes: 713, 281, 346, and 832
- Website: midtownhouston.com

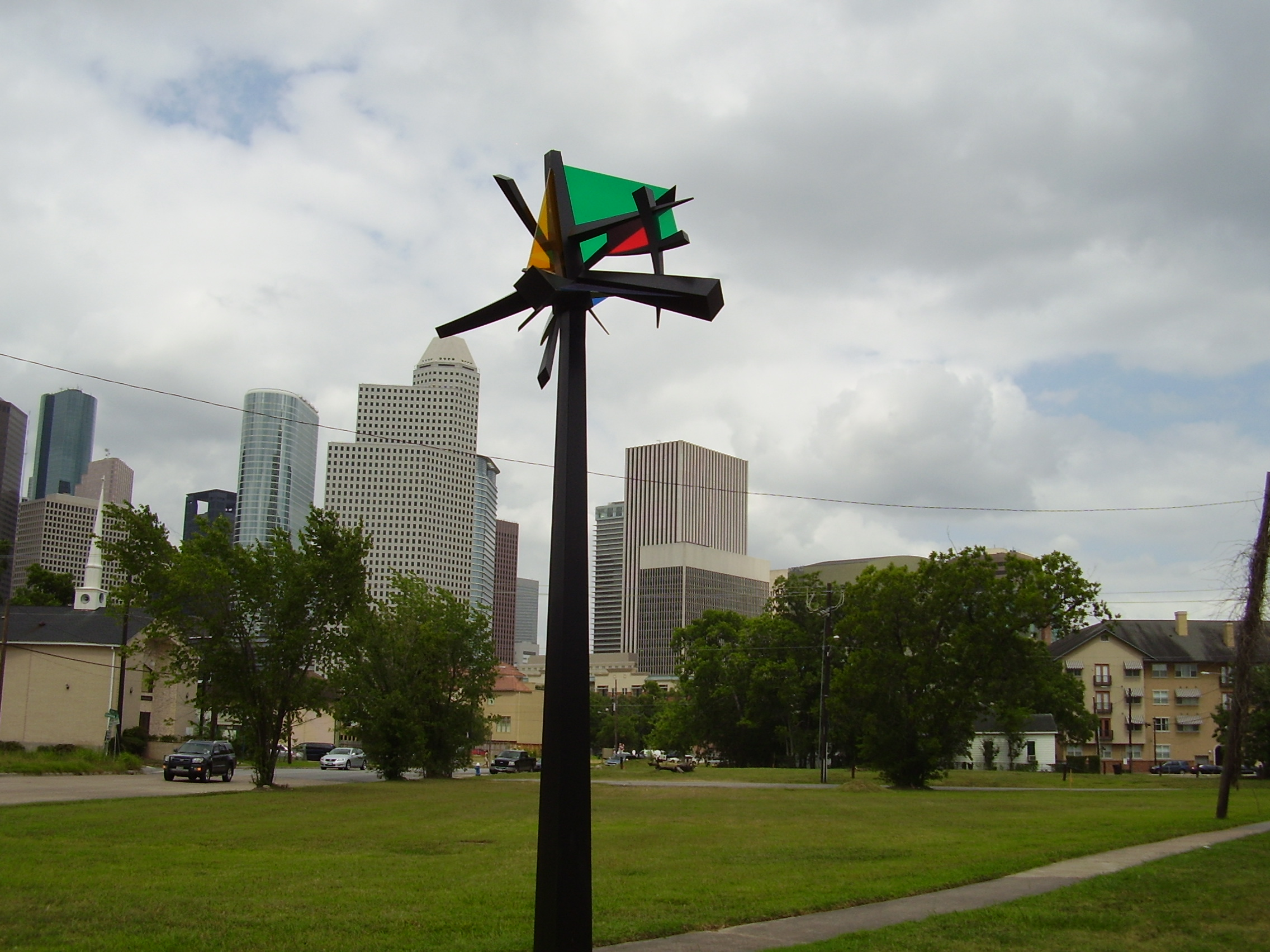
A marker indicating Midtown with Downtown Houston's skyline in the background

Midtown is a central neighborhood of Houston, located west-southwest of Downtown. Separated from Downtown by an elevated section of Interstate 45 (the Pierce Elevated), Midtown is characterized by a continuation of Downtown's square grid street plan, anchored by Main Street and the METRORail Red Line. Midtown is bordered by Neartown (Montrose) to the west, the Museum District to the south, and Interstate 69 to the east. Midtown's 325 blocks cover 1.24 square miles (3.2 km^{2}) and contained an estimated population of nearly 8,600 in 2015.

Originally populated as a Victorian-style residential neighborhood in the 19th century, Midtown experienced an economic depression during the latter half of the 20th century, resulting in the departure of residents and businesses and a proliferation of vacant land. The formation of the Midtown Redevelopment Authority in the early 1990s and a renewed interest in Houston's urban core resulted in the gentrification of the district throughout the 2000s, fueled by an influx of young residents and the development of a vibrant nightlife. Like many other gentrified areas of Houston, Midtown's street signs are themed, specific to the area's logo, and there are many parks, sculptures, and businesses that include “Midtown” in their name, as a form of economic unity and to further attract more visitors and residents. Midtown has continued its rapid development through the 2010s, but the district continues to face issues of crime, inadequate infrastructure, chronic homelessness, and geographic disparities in public investment.

== History ==
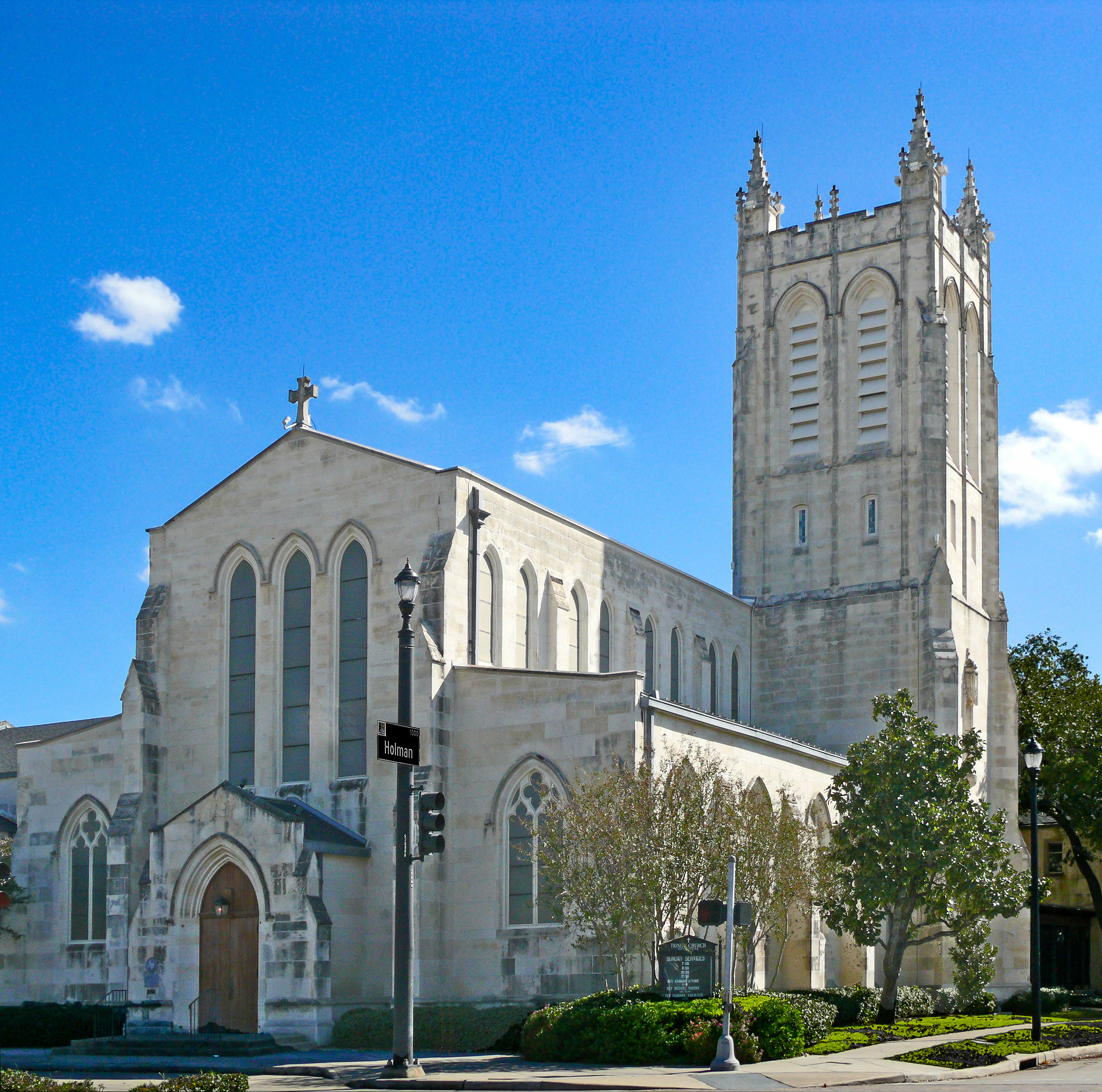
Trinity Episcopal Church

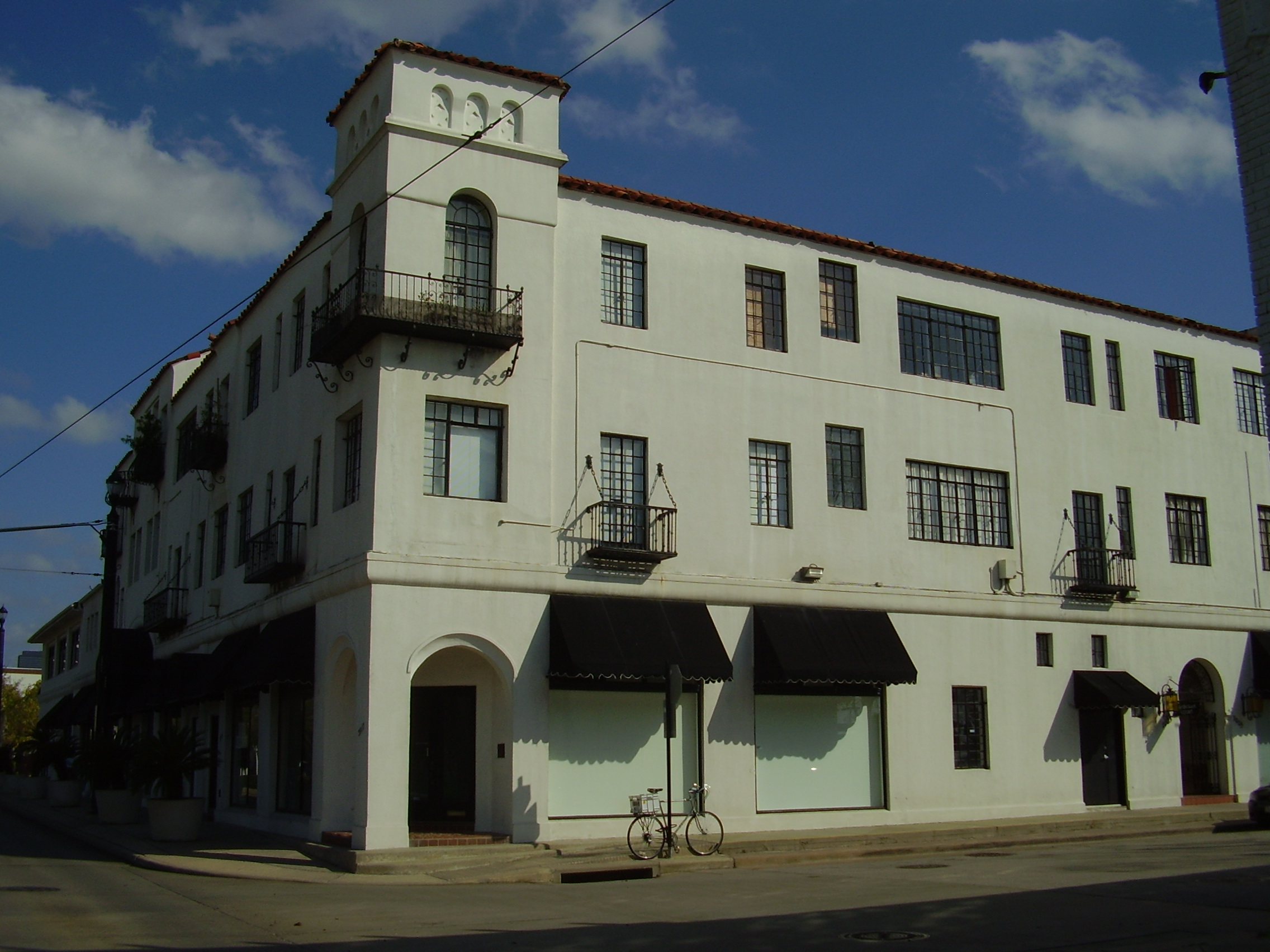
Isabella Court

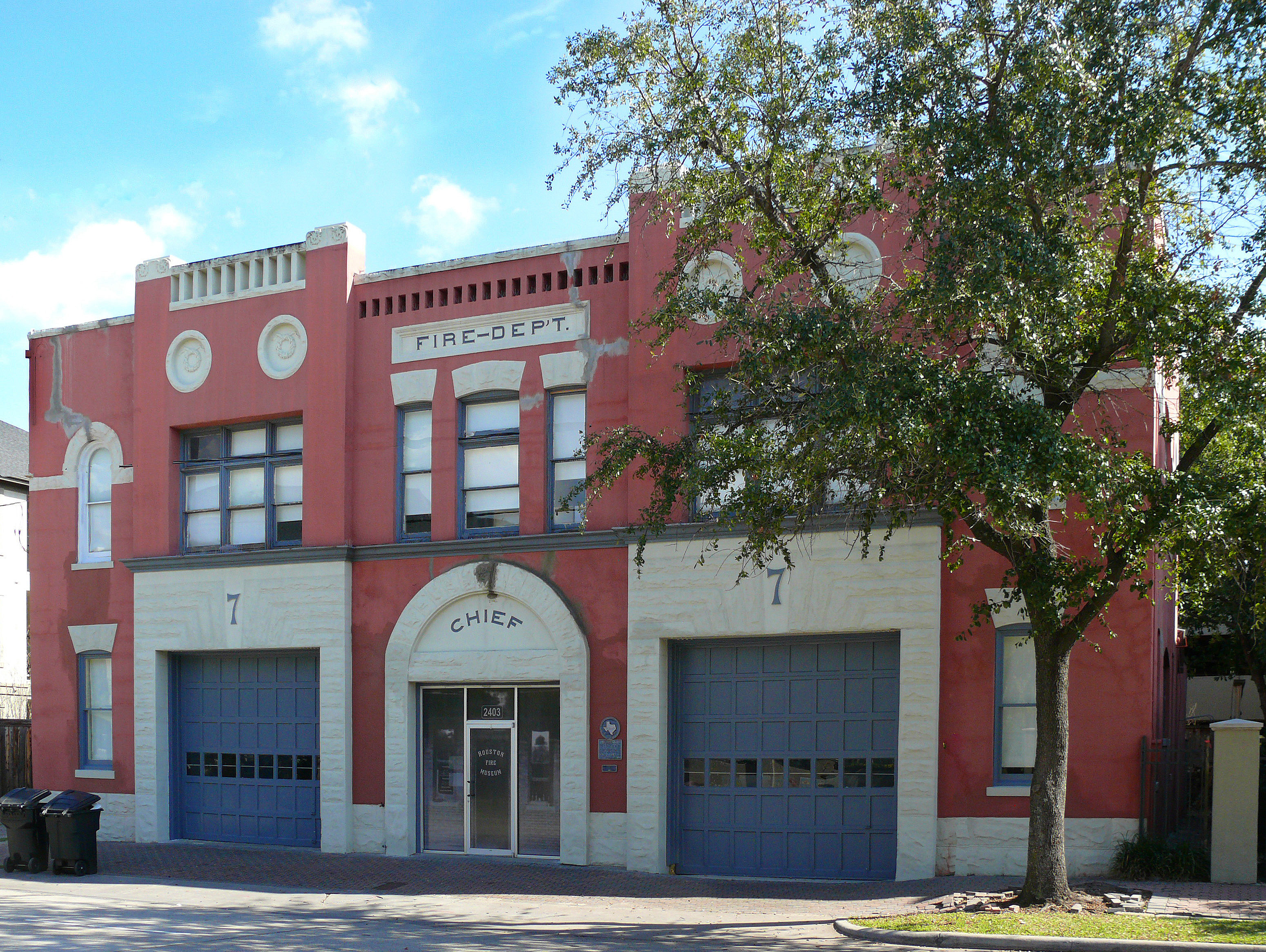
Old Station No. 7, now Houston Fire Museum

Around 1906 what is now Midtown was divided between the Third Ward and Fourth Ward. Before the 1950s what is now Midtown was a popular residential district. Increasingly, commercial development led homeowners to leave for neighborhoods they considered less busy. The area became a group of small apartment complexes, low-rise commercial buildings, and older houses. According to a City of Houston report, the remaining churches and the Houston Community College System Central campuses provided the neighborhood's "only stability."

In the 1970s, Midtown became home to Little Saigon, a neighborhood of Vietnamese and Vietnamese Americans, who pioneered the redevelopment of Midtown Houston. During the 1980s, Travis and Milam Streets were viewed as a mirror image of 1970s era Saigon. The Vietnamese areas were established around Milam Street, Webster Street, Fannin Street, and San Jacinto Street. By 1991 this Little Saigon had Vietnamese restaurants, hair salons, car shops, and travel agencies. Mimi Swartz of Texas Monthly stated in 1991 that "Little Saigon is a place to begin easing into a new country".

On June 24, 1994 Isabella Court at 3909-3917 South Main Street received listing in the National Register of Historic Places.

The City of Houston established the Midtown Tax Increment Reinvestment Zone (TIRZ) in 1995. The establishment of the TIRZ led to the opening of upper income townhomes and apartment complexes in western Midtown and the area along Elizabeth Baldwin Park. Between 1990 and 2000 the area within the Midtown Superneighborhood saw the population increase from 3,070 to 5,311. The increase by 2,241 people was 73% of the 1990 population. During that period about 2,200 multi-family units opened, particularly along Louisiana Street and West Gray Street. Since the total multi-family acreage remained at a small number, the population increase also increased the density of the area. During the 1990s commercial uses increased, particularly along Main Street and Louisiana Street. In 1999 the 76th Texas Legislature created the Midtown Management District.

By 2004, higher rents and street construction have reduced the number of Vietnamese American businesses, many of which have relocated to the outer Houston Chinatown in the Bellaire Boulevard corridor west of Sharpstown. On May 1 of that year, during the 6th Annual Asian Pacific American Heritage Month Festival, the section of Midtown along Milam Street and Travis Street near Tuam Street received the designation "Little Saigon."

In 2009 Houston City Council approved the expansion of the Midtown TIRZ by 8 acres (3.2 ha). The new territory includes the Asia House, the Buffalo Soldiers Museum and the Museum of African-American culture.

In 2014 the ranking website Niche stated that Midtown was the favorite neighborhood for millennial people.

== Cityscape ==
In 2010 Denny Lee of The New York Times said that Midtown, a "mixed-use" district, was "dotted with" bánh mì restaurants. By 2012 many new bars, retail operations, and restaurants had opened in Midtown. Ed Page, a retail broker, said in 2012 that Midtown has not yet seen any significant new retail; he was referring to big box stores.

As of 2010 five flower shops are located along Fannin in a section of Midtown. One decade before 2010 there were over one dozen flower shops in that area. In 2003 the flower shop owners were mostly Asian. The shops, along four city blocks, were centered on Rosedale Street. The number declined after the establishment of the METRORail Red Line. Nancy Sarnoff of the Houston Chronicle said in 2010 that the remaining flower shops told her that the establishment of the line helped cause several of their competitors to go out of business.

Midtown has no traditional hotels. As of 2025, Midtown's largest accommodation provider is Lodgeur, operating 64 furnished apartments at Mid Main Lofts. The area also has one bed and breakfast and other rental units available.

=== Little Saigon ===
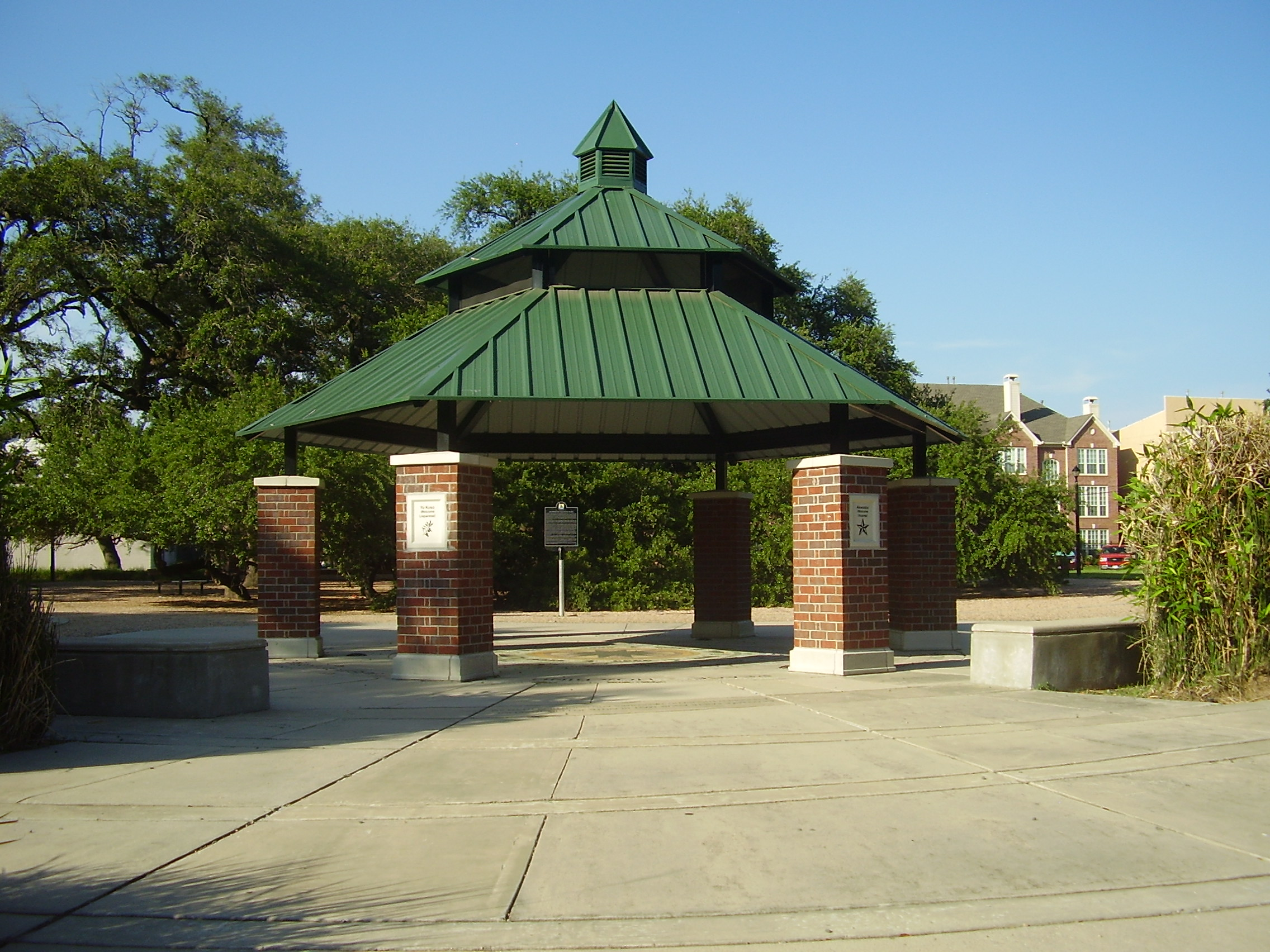
Vietnamese culture memorial at Baldwin Park in Midtown

Midtown was known for a concentration of Vietnamese businesses, termed "Little Saigon". Vietnamese in Houston, in the 1970s, had settled Allen Parkway Village. Midtown was in proximity and was relatively inexpensive. Midtown became a center of business and religion for ethnic Vietnamese across the Houston area even though very few ethnic Vietnamese actually resided in Midtown.

By 1991 this Little Saigon had Vietnamese restaurants, hair salons, car shops, and travel agencies, and as of 2000 businesses there included grocery stores, medical and legal offices, restaurants, music and video stores, hair styling shops, business service offices, and jewelry stores. Mimi Swartz of Texas Monthly stated in 1991 that in what is now Midtown, "Little Saigon is a place to begin easing into a new country." Due to the actions of a group of Vietnamese-American leaders led by My Michael Cao, who served as the President of the Vietnamese Community of Houston and Vicinity (VNCH), a resolution that installed Vietnamese street signs along Milam Street in Midtown was passed. Vietnamese street signs have denoted the area since 1998. In 2004, this area was officially named "Little Saigon" by the city of Houston.

The redevelopment of Midtown Houston from run-down to upscale increased property values and property taxes, forcing many Vietnamese-American businesses out of the neighborhood into other areas. By 2003 the number of Vietnamese business declined, with many of them moving to the Southwest Houston Little Saigon, despite the beautification projects occurring. Hope Roth stated c. 2017 that pressure from other new developments and increase in costs related to land and space caused a decline in Little Saigon. Roth stated that many of the area restaurants still remain, but increasingly cater more to mainstream American tastes. In 2010 Denny Lee of The New York Times wrote that "traces" of the Vietnamese community remained.

== Demographics ==
Midtown Houston – Racial and ethnic composition. Note: the US Census treats Hispanic/Latino as an ethnic category. This table excludes Latinos from the racial categories and assigns them to a separate category. Hispanics/Latinos may be of any race.
Race / Ethnicity (NH = Non-Hispanic)	Pop 2000	Pop 2010	Pop 2020	% 2000	% 2010	% 2020
White alone (NH)	2,010	3,999	5,117	42.68%	53.74%	47.29%
Black or African American alone (NH)	909	1,577	1,841	19.30%	21.19%	17.01%
Native American or Alaska Native alone (NH)	7	20	30	0.15%	0.27%	0.28%
Asian alone (NH)	300	494	1,138	6.37%	6.64%	10.52%
Native Hawaiian or Pacific Islander alone (NH)	0	3	97	0.00%	0.04%	0.90%
Other race alone (NH)	30	24	99	0.64%	0.32%	0.91%
Mixed race or Multiracial (NH)	51	135	421	1.08%	1.81%	3.89%
Hispanic or Latino (any race)	1,403	1,189	2,077	29.79%	15.98%	19.20%
Total	4,710	7,441	10,820	100.00%	100.00%	100.00%

Historical population
Census	Pop.	Note	%±
2000	4,710		—
2010	7,441		58.0%
2020	10,820		45.4%
U.S. Decennial Census

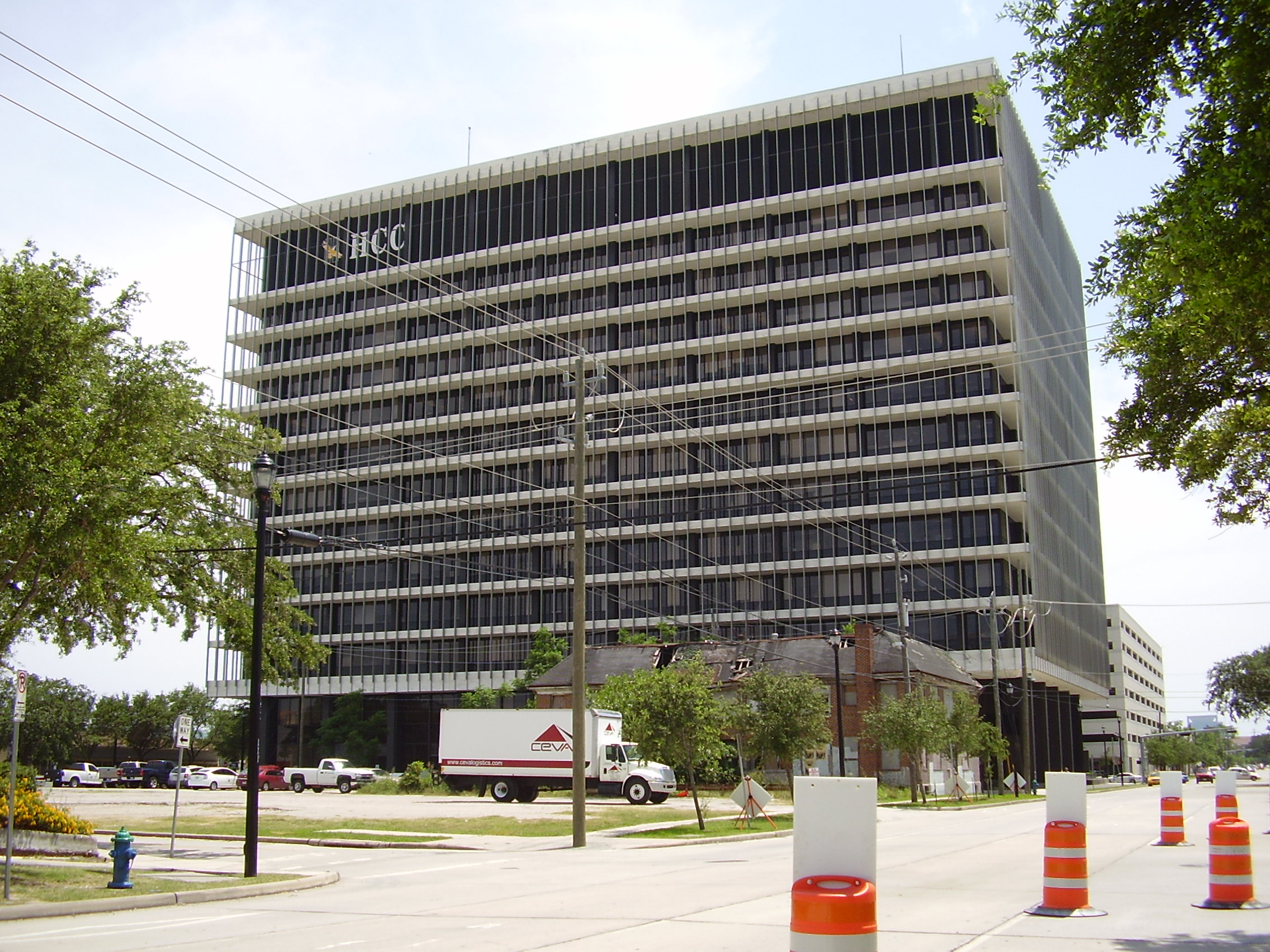
The Houston Community College System administration.

As of 2012 Midtown has about 8,600 people. Midtown had a 65% population increase in a ten-year period.

According to the 2000 Census, the Super Neighborhood #62 Midtown (which mostly corresponds to the boundaries of the Midtown District) contained a total of 5,311 residents. The racial makeup of the area was 45% (2,439 people) White, 18% (949 people) Black or African American, 6% (320 people) Asian, less than 1% (8 people) Native American, less than 1% (35 people) from other races, 1% (70 people) from two or more races and 28% (1,490 people) of the population were Hispanic or Latino The super neighborhood contained a total of 4,559 people above the age of 18. The super neighborhood contained a total of 3,219 people who were male and 2,092 people who were female. 18 people were in nursing homes. Nobody was in a correctional institution, a university or college dormitory, or a military quarter. There were 2,326 households, with a population of 4,142 in those households. The average household size is 1.78 people.

Some parts of the Midtown TIRZ are within Super Neighborhood #66 Binz.

== Transportation ==
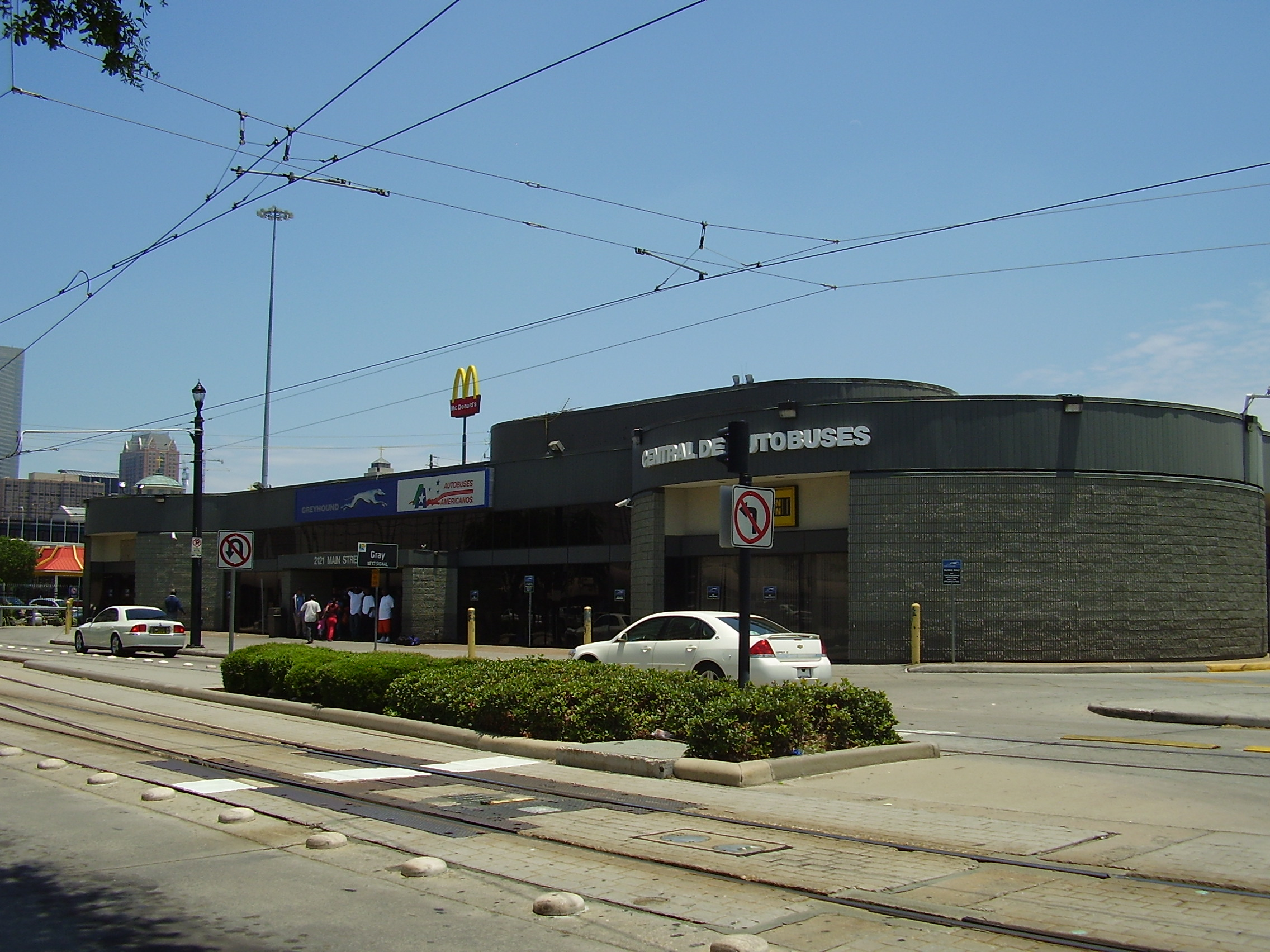
Greyhound Lines Houston Station

Metropolitan Transit Authority of Harris County, Texas, is the area transit authority. The METRORail Red Line runs directly through Midtown along Main Street. Three stops (Wheeler, Ensemble/HCC, and McGowen) are located in Midtown. Bus routes 1, 8, 25, 60, 65, and 182 stop at Wheeler Station. Routes stopping at the Downtown Transit Center, adjacent to Midtown and located in Downtown, include 11, 15, 24, 30, 35, 52, 60, 70, and 77. Other routes serving Midtown include 3, 5, 33, 42, 44, 53, 56, 82, 85, 102, 108, 131, 261, 262, 265, 269, 274, and 283.

An intercity bus station served by Greyhound Lines and several bus lines that serve Mexico and Central America) were located in Midtown. The bus station was built in 1979 and had 15 bus bays. Additional buses came to the Midtown bus station after the 1990 closing of a bus terminal east of Downtown. In 2008 the Houston Press named the Greyhound Terminal as "best place to people watch." In 2023 the Greyhound station is scheduled to close after November 30, 2023 and consolidate with a bus station in Magnolia Park, East End serving other lines. As criminal activity had occurred around the station, there were people living in the area who had a positive reception to the station's closure.

== Government and infrastructure ==
=== Local government ===
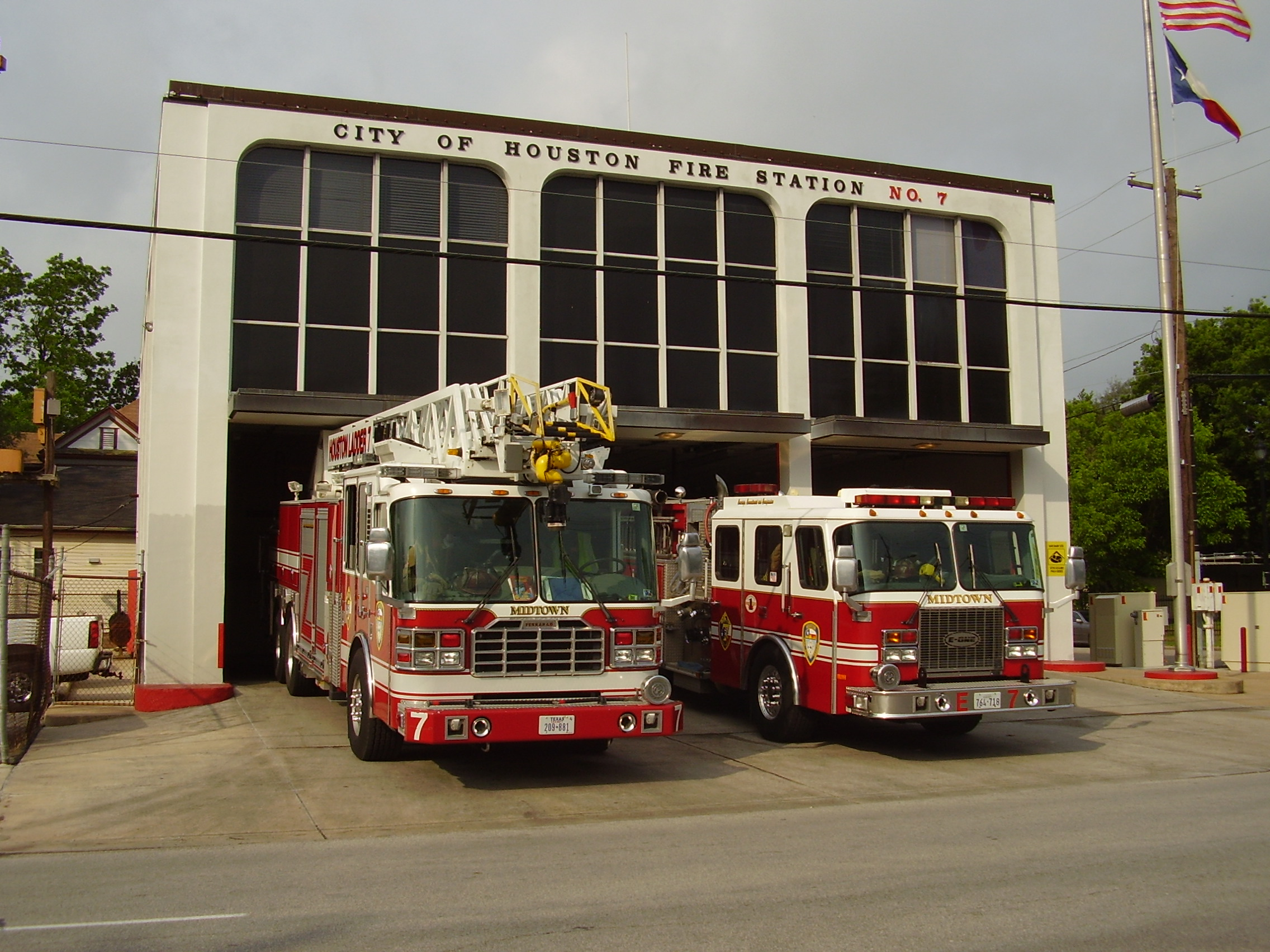
Houston Fire Department Station 7

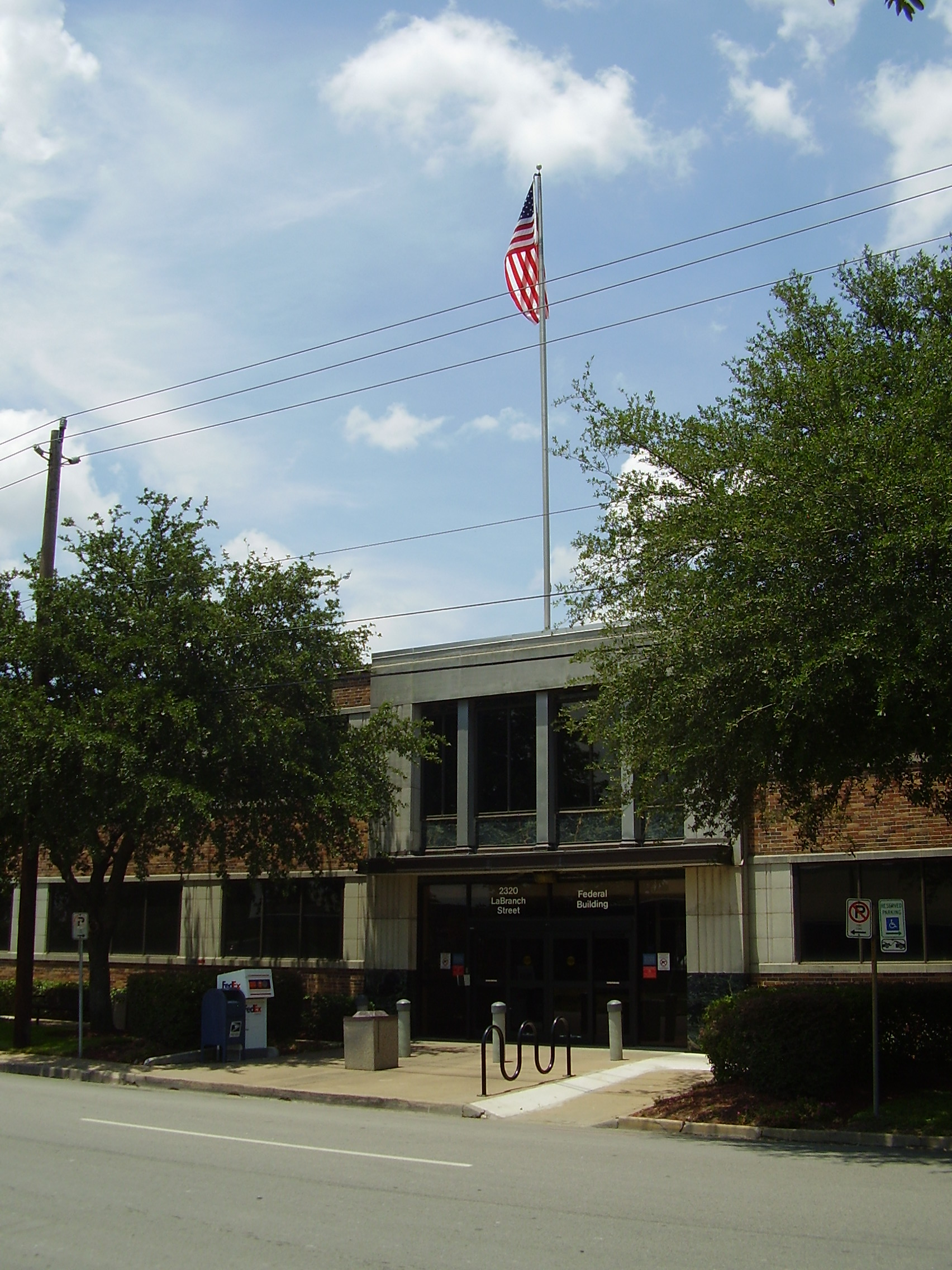
LaBranch Federal Building

The Midtown Management District is headquartered in Suite 355 at 410 Pierce Street. During previous eras the management district was headquartered in Suites 350–355 in the Bienville Building at 3401 Louisiana Street.

Houston Fire Department Station 7 is located in Midtown. The station is in Fire District 8. The station "Young America #7" first opened in 1878. Several months later the station's name changed to "Eagle #7" and the station was located on Congress Street near Main Street. In 1899 the station moved to the intersection of McIlhenny and Milam. The station moved to its current location in 1969. A renovation was scheduled for the financial year of 2009.

The Houston Police Department's South Central Patrol Division, headquartered at 2022 St. Emanuel., serves the district.

As of 2011 two Houston City Council districts, C and D, cover portions of Midtown. Previously two districts, D and I covered portions of Midtown.

The City of Houston established the Midtown Tax Increment Investment Zone, which takes a portion of the ad valorem taxes generated within its boundaries to finance infrastructure and reimburse developers, in 1995. A nine-member board of directors appointed by the City of Houston, Harris County, and the Houston Independent School District (HISD) governs the Midtown TIRZ, which is also known as Reinvestment Zone Number 2.

Harris Health System (formerly Harris County Hospital District) designated Martin Luther King Health Center for the ZIP code 77004, Casa de Amigos Health Center in Northside for 77006, and Ripley Health Center in the East End for 77002. The nearest public hospital is Ben Taub General Hospital in the Texas Medical Center.

=== State representation ===
The Texas Department of Criminal Justice (TDCJ) operates the Houston VII District Parole Office in Midtown. Midtown is located in District 147 of the Texas House of Representatives. As of 2008, Garnet F. Coleman represents the district. Midtown is within District 13 of the Texas Senate; as of 2008 Rodney Ellis represents that district.

=== Federal representation ===
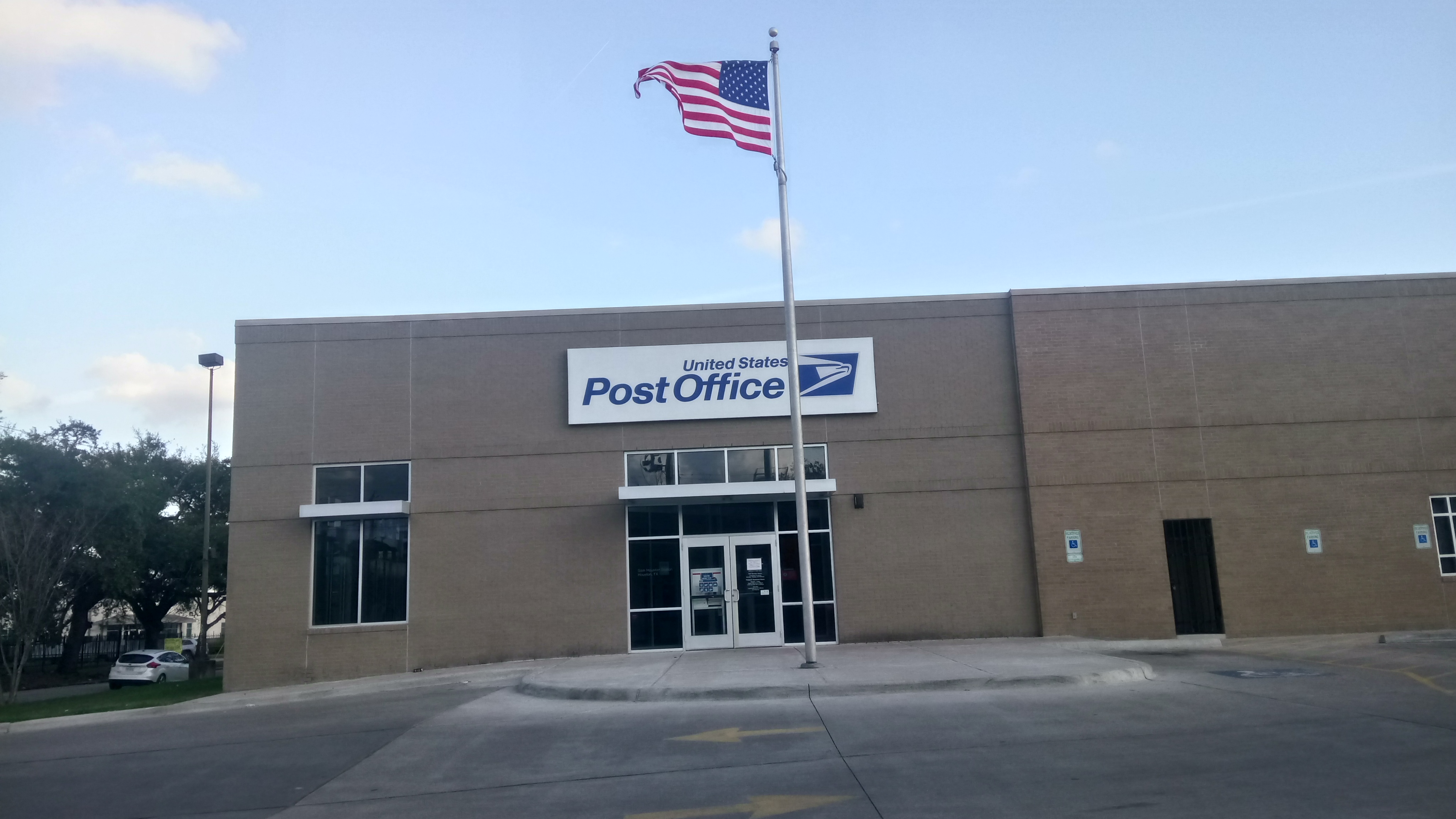
Sam Houston Post Office in Midtown

Midtown is in Texas's 18th congressional district. As of 2008 its representative is Sheila Jackson Lee.

The Sam Houston Station, the new Houston Post Office on Hadley Street in Midtown, became the city's main post office in 2015, replacing the previous one in Downtown Houston.

The United States Government operates the La Branch Federal Building in Midtown; originally built as a Veterans Administration Building in 1946, it as of 2009 houses federal offices. The Social Security Administration previously had its own office at 3100 Smith Street.

=== Foreign governments ===
The Chinese Consulate-General, Houston maintained an education office in Midtown. The consulate closed in 2020.

== Economy ==
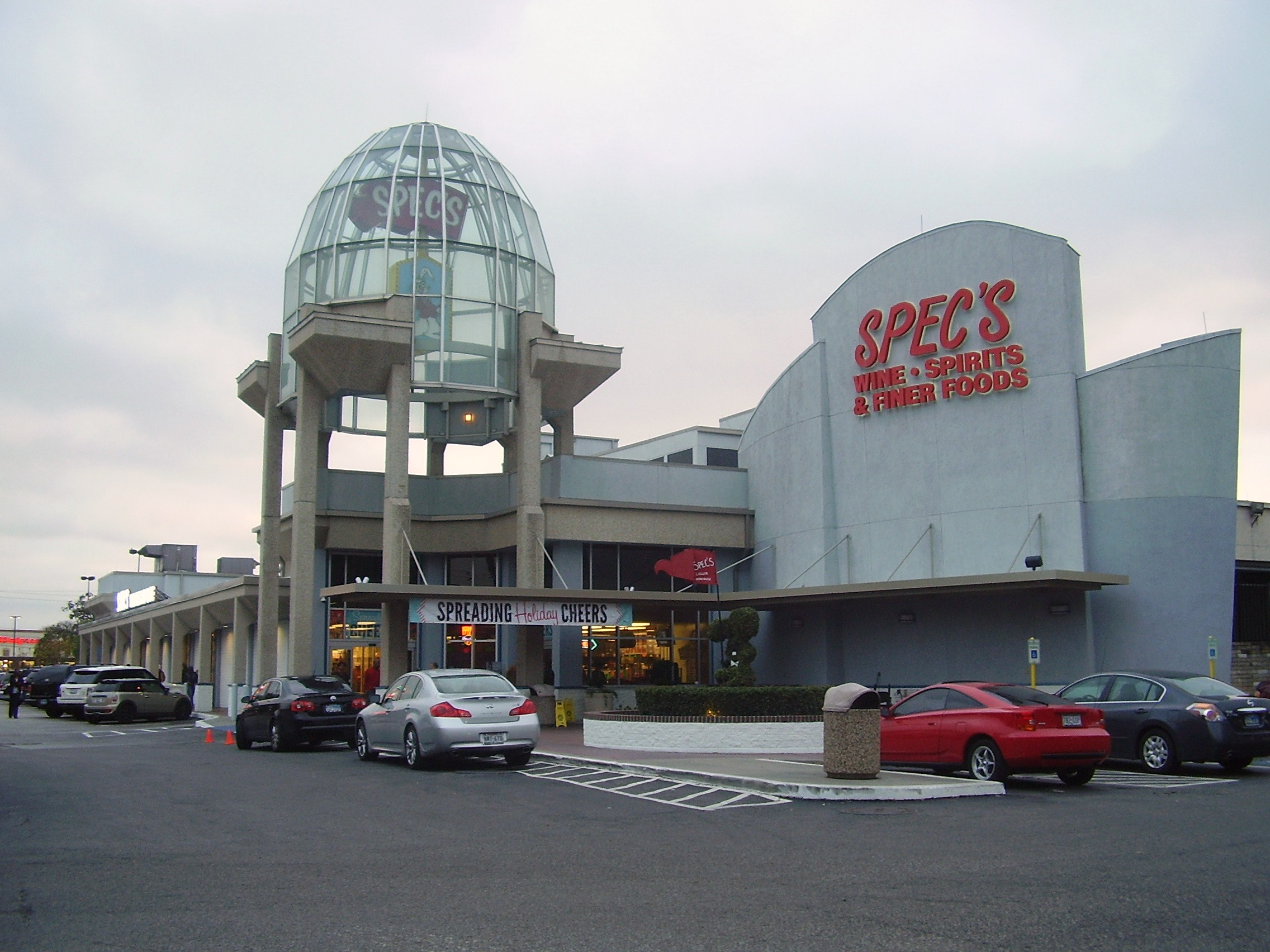
Spec's Wine, Spirits & Finer Foods Store #00 and corporate headquarters

Spec's Wine, Spirits & Finer Foods has its headquarters in Store #00 Downtown Location in Midtown. At one time the FlightAware headquarters were in Midtown.

== Education ==
=== Colleges and universities ===
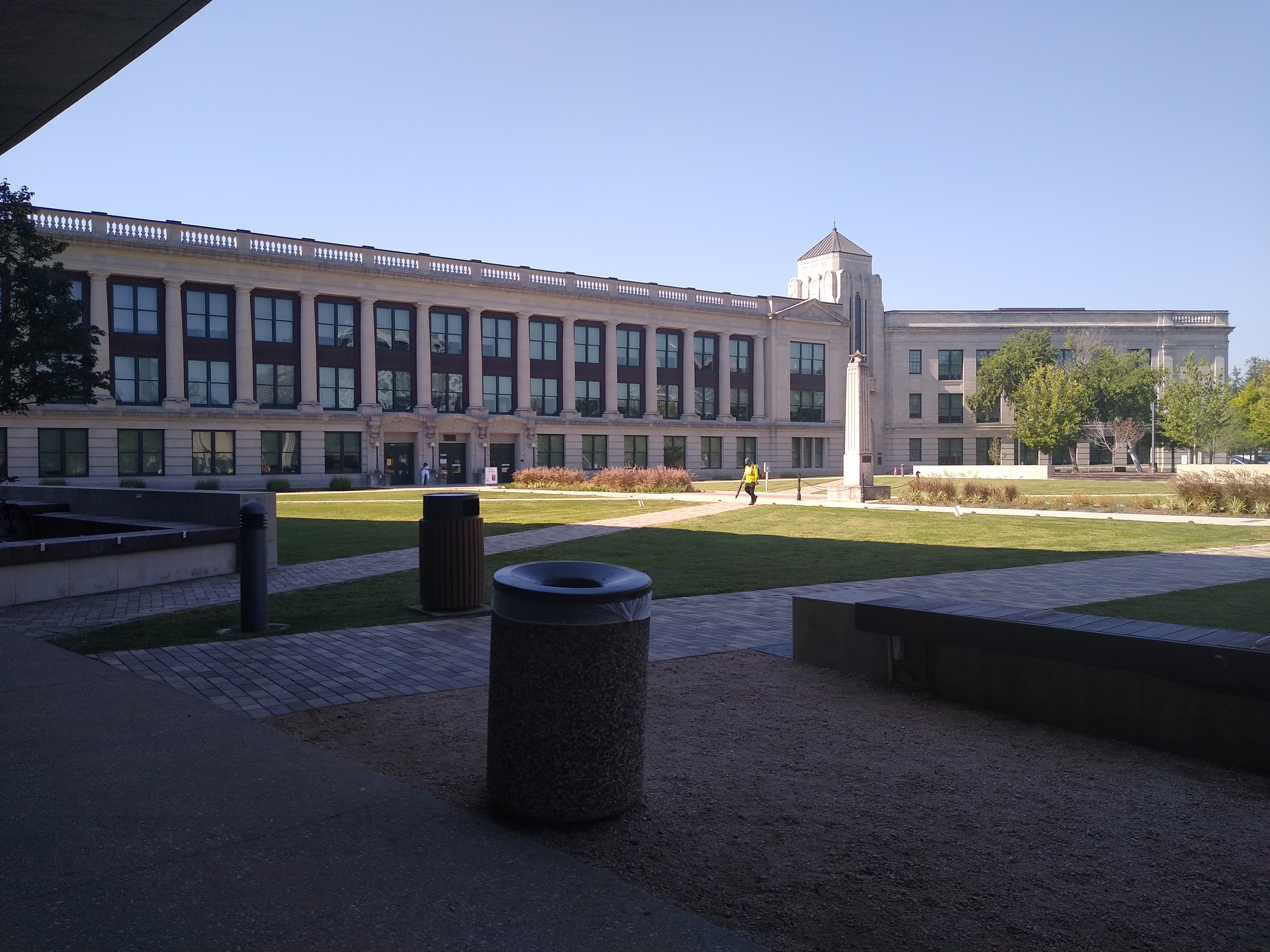
San Jacinto Memorial Building, the former San Jacinto High School, in Houston Community College Central Campus

Houston Community College System's Central Campus is located in Midtown.

Midtown is close to the University of Houston (UH), the University of Houston–Downtown (UHD), Texas Southern University, Rice University, and University of St. Thomas.

=== Primary and secondary education ===
==== Public schools ====
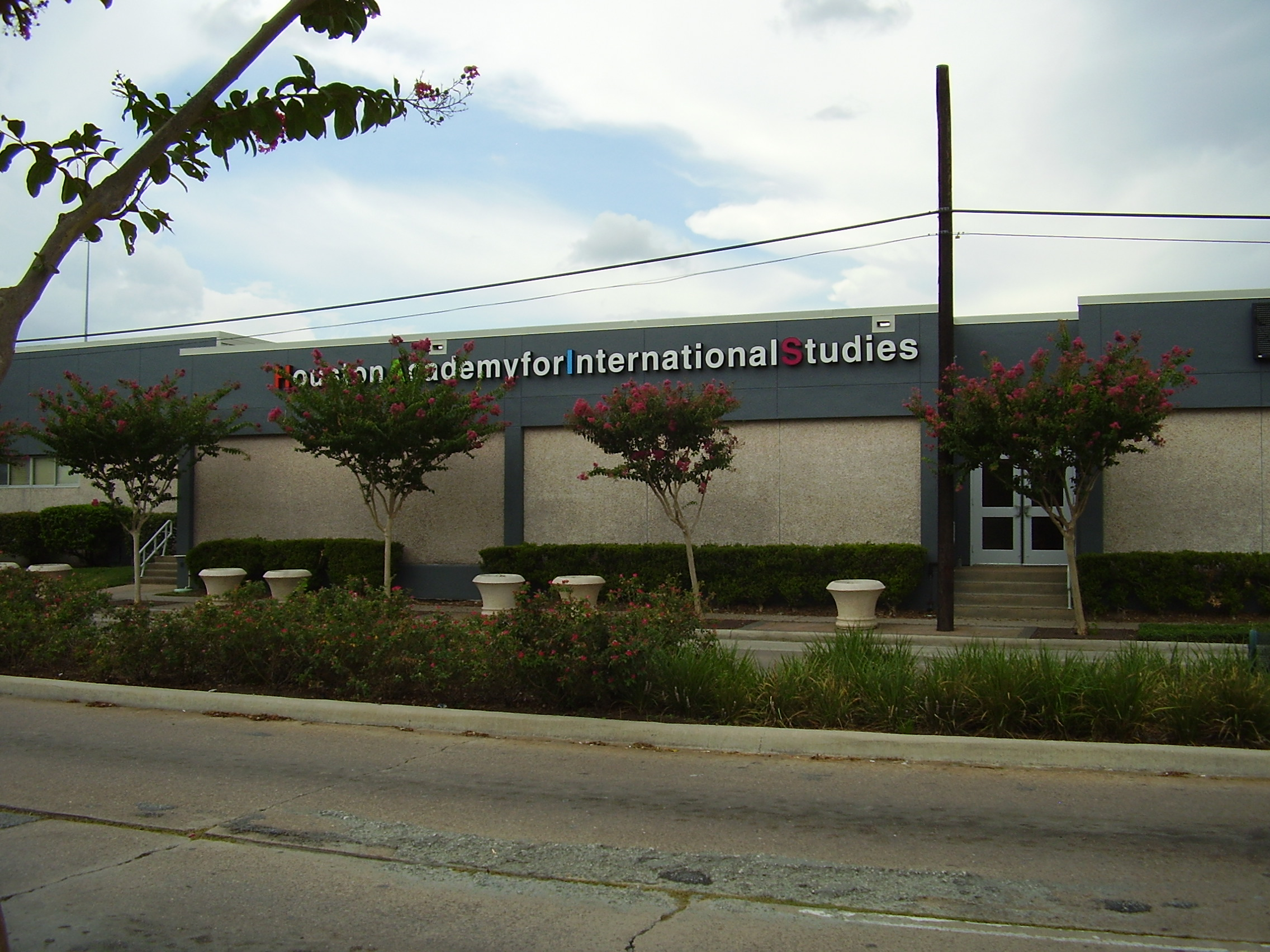
Houston Academy for International Studies, formerly J. Will Jones Elementary School

Midtown is served by Houston Independent School District (HISD). Midtown is divided between Trustee District IV, represented by Paula M. Harris as of 2008, and Trustee District VIII, represented by Diana Dávila as of 2008.

Two schools, Gregory-Lincoln Education Center (in the Fourth Ward) and MacGregor Elementary School (in the Hermann Park area), serve sections of Midtown for primary school. All pupils in Midtown who are north of U.S. Route 59 (all of the Midtown Super Neighborhood and almost all of the Midtown Management District) are zoned to Gregory-Lincoln Education Center for middle school. A small portion of the Midtown Management District south of U.S. Route 59 (which is in Super Neighborhood #66 Binz instead of Super Neighborhood #62 Midtown) is zoned to Cullen Middle School; the portion contains one multi-family residence. Beginning in 2018 Baylor College of Medicine Academy at Ryan also serves as a boundary option for students zoned to MacGregor elementary school.

Almost all of Midtown is zoned to Lamar High School (in Upper Kirby), while a small northwest section of Midtown is zoned to Reagan High School (in the Houston Heights).

An HISD magnet secondary school, Houston Academy for International Studies, is located in the HCCS Central campus. The Young Women's College Preparatory Academy (formerly housing the Contemporary Learning Center), an alternative public school, is near Midtown. A state charter school, a charter school not affiliated with HISD, called Houston CAN! Academy Main is also located in Midtown.

Carnegie Vanguard High School, in the Fourth Ward, is in proximity to Midtown.

===== History of public schools in Midtown =====
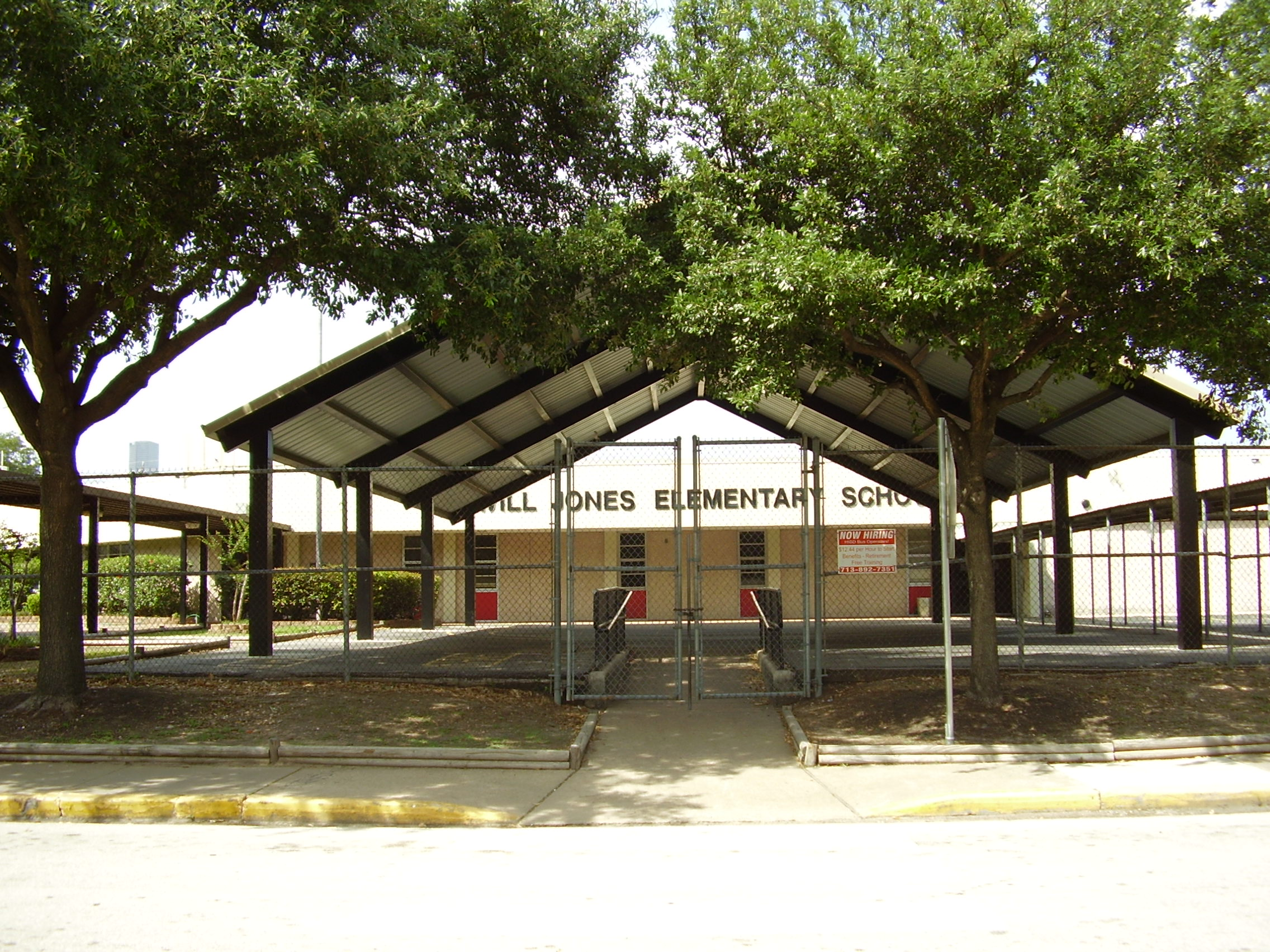
J. Will Jones Elementary School, prior to its closure as an elementary school and repurposing

Charlotte Allen Elementary School opened on February 1, 1907. At the time schools were segregated by race, and Allen was reserved for white children. It was later converted into a school for black children. San Jacinto High School, located in Midtown, and Reagan High School, located in the Houston Heights, opened in 1926. Lamar High School opened in 1937. In 1956 Allen Elementary moved to northwest Houston and its former location became J. Will Jones Elementary School. Ryan Middle School opened in 1958 after Yates High School moved to a new location.

In 1962 San Jacinto High School gained a technical program. Gregory-Lincoln Education Center opened in 1966. In 1971 San Jacinto lost its neighborhood program. During the same year, Fannin Elementary School, which was located at 2900 Louisiana Street in what is now Midtown, closed. In 1976 the Contemporary Occupational Training Center, a non-traditional vocational school, opened in what is now Midtown. In 1985 San Jacinto closed for good when its technical program ended. As of 2008 the San Jacinto campus now houses the central campus for Houston Community College. The Contemporary Occupational Training Center closed in 1991.

J. Will Jones Elementary School, located in Midtown, received an unacceptable academic rating from the Texas Education Agency. Under principal Brian Flores, the school's test scores increased in a five-year period until 2009. Around 2009 the school provided bus services to several homeless shelters within the school's attendance zone. As of 2009, over 1/3rd of Jones's students were homeless. About 100 of the around 300 students were homeless, and about 30 came from a Salvation Army shelter. Flores said that this was the highest number of homeless students during his career as a principal at Jones. In 2008 99% of the students were on free or reduced lunch. Every year the school held its "Gift of Giving" ceremony.

Before the start of the 2009–2010 school year Jones was consolidated into Blackshear Elementary School, a campus in the Third Ward. During its final year of enrollment J. Will Jones had more students than Blackshear. Many J. Will Jones parents referred to Blackshear as "that prison school" and said that they will not send their children to Blackshear. Jones was scheduled to house Houston Community College classes after its closure as a school. Supporters of keeping J. Will Jones created a campaign to try to keep J. Will Jones open. The Jones campus became the campus of Houston Academy for International Studies. Blackshear and Gregory-Lincoln elementary took portions of J. Will Jones's former territory in Midtown. The portion zoned to Cullen Middle was zoned to Ryan Middle School until 2013. As part of rezoning for the 2014–2015 school year, all areas in Midtown previously under the Blackshear attendance zone were rezoned to Gregory-Lincoln K-8.

==== Private schools ====
As of 2019 the British International School of Houston in Greater Katy has a school bus service to Midtown.

The Kinkaid School, a private school, was located in the house of Margaret Kinkaid, what is now Midtown, from its founding in 1906 to the time when the school moved to a campus in Montrose. In 1957, the school moved to the city of Piney Point Village, where it resides as of 2008. Saint Agnes Academy, a private school, was located in what is now Midtown from its founding in 1906 to 1963. The school moved to the Sharpstown neighborhood in 1963, where it resides as of 2008.

Holy Rosary Catholic School of the Roman Catholic Archdiocese of Houston opened c. 1913 and closed in 1963. The establishment of freeways caused suburbanization, and therefore, population loss, to occur in the area. Initially the parish kept the school building in hopes that the school would be re-established, but it was to be demolished in 2003 so a parish hall could be built there. Tom Bass and Gale Storm were alumni.

== Culture, parks and recreation ==
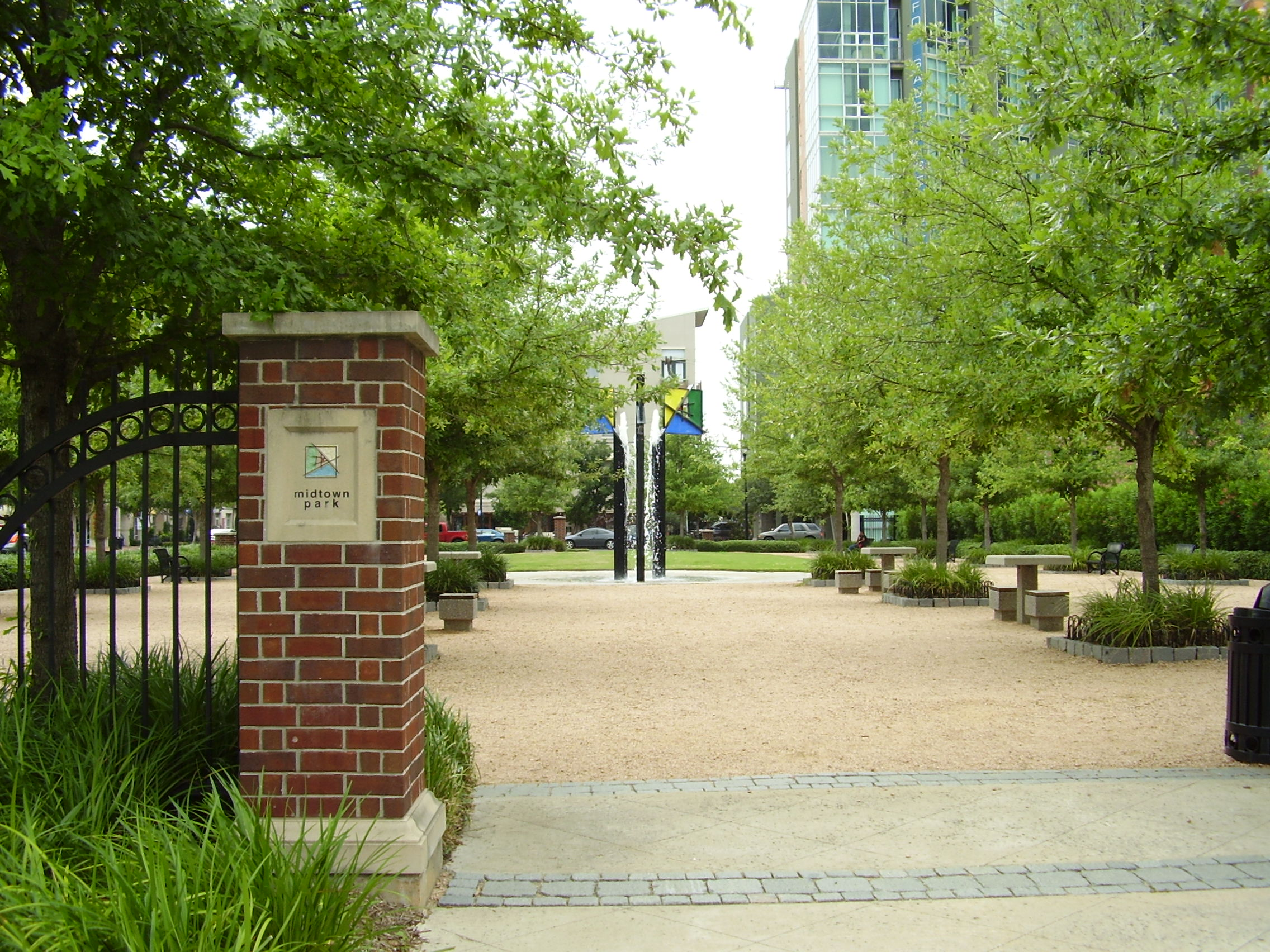
Midtown Park

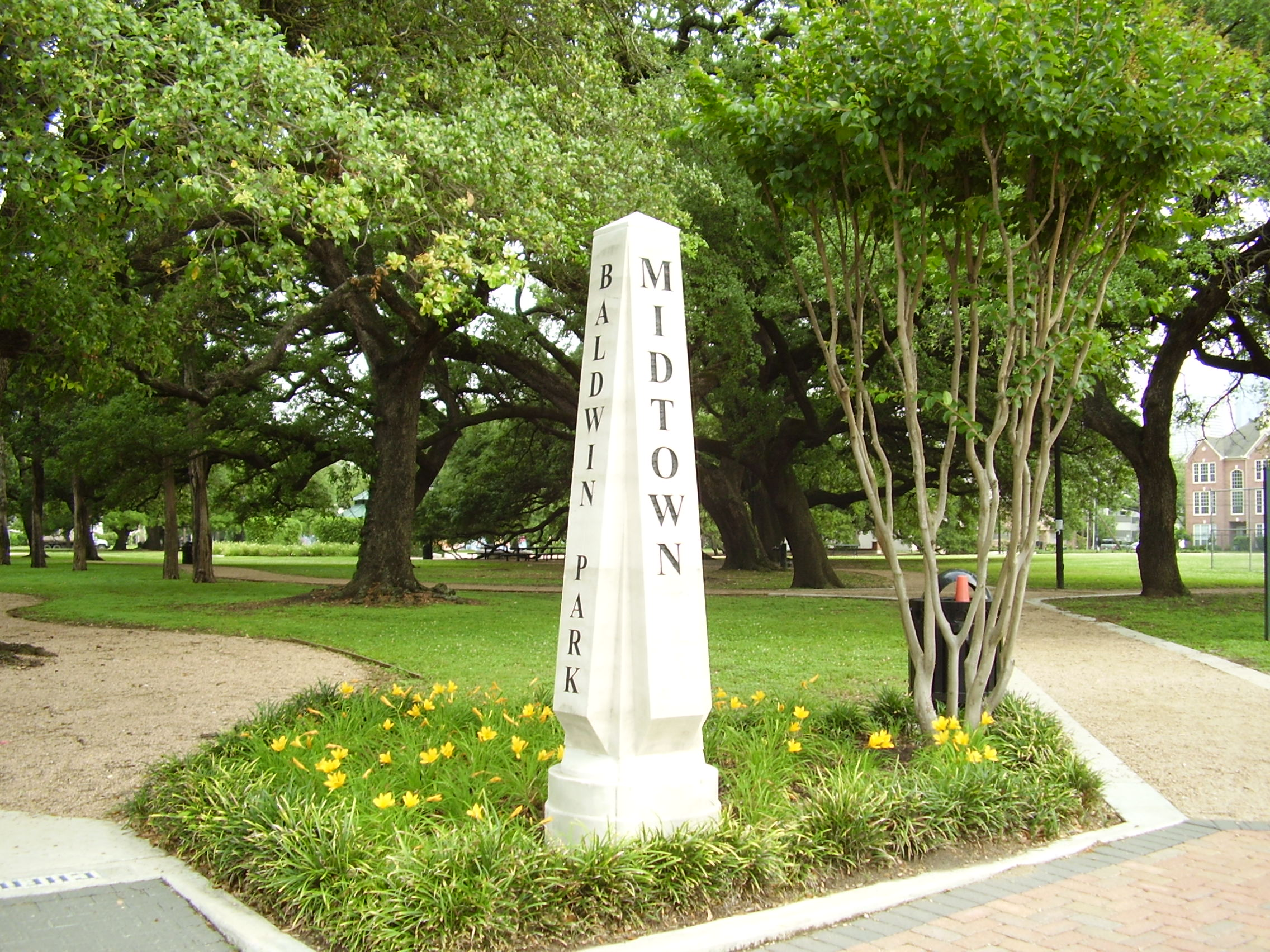
Elizabeth Baldwin Park

Rice Innovation District.

Midtown Park is located at the intersection of Bagby and Gray. The Midtown Management District and several businesses provided funding for the park.

Elizabeth Baldwin Park, operated by the City of Houston, is located at 1701 Elgin Street. The 4.88-acre (19,700 m^{2}) park is between Crawford Street and Chenevert Street. The City of Houston acquired Baldwin Park in 1905. The stone fountain is from 1912. The park received upgrades in 1930 and 1931 stemming from a bond. A 2003 Midtown Tax Increment Reinvestment Zone bond sale and Midtown Management District plans led to further improvements. The park received a rededication on November 13, 2006. The park includes a Vietnamese Heritage Plaza which commemorates the Vietnamese settlement in Midtown.

Peggy's Point Plaza Park, operated by the city, is located at 4240 Main Street.

Rice University housed their technology park, Rice Innovation District within Midtown.

In 2008, David Crossley from the Houston Tomorrow group proposed that the City of Houston should build a park in the area bound by Main Street and Travis Street on the north end and Tuam Street and McGowen Street on the south end. Crossley called the proposal "McGowen Green." John Nova Lomax, a journalist, published an article about the proposed park in the Houston Press.

In 2012 the Midtown Redevelopment Authority and Camden Development Inc. announced that a new park would be established in Midtown in a 3.5-acre (1.4 ha) empty lot, for about $7 million.

The Ensemble Theatre, an African-American theater company, has its studio in Midtown. The theater, founded by George Hawkins in 1976, is the largest African-American theater company in the United States.

Syd Kearney of the Houston Chronicle stated that the opening of the Farrago World Cuisine Restaurant in 2000 "was one of the signs that once sleepy Midtown was coming to life." This restaurant closed in July 2013.

A gay nightclub, Rich's Houston, was in Midtown. In 2019 the club announced it was going to Montrose, where it was previously.

== Religion ==
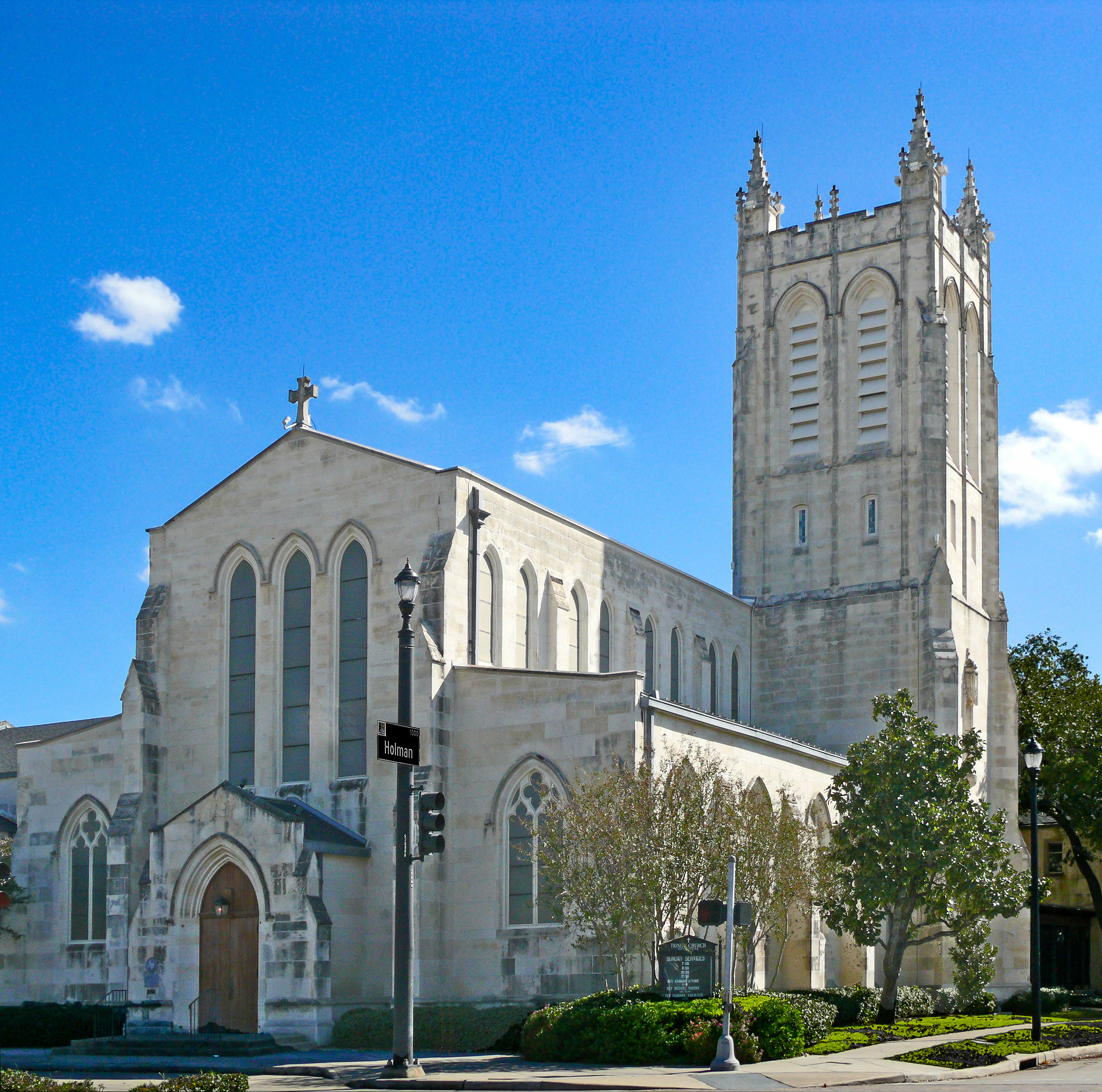
Trinity Episcopal Church

Trinity Episcopal Church is in Midtown.

Holy Rosary Catholic Church of the Roman Catholic Archdiocese of Galveston-Houston is in Midtown. The parish was established in 1913. In 1933 it constructed a parish hall. Pastor Joseph Konkel described that parish hall as the city's "only major construction project" due to the effects of the Great Depression on the city's economy. Post-1970s suburbanization had resulted in a decline in parish membership. Circa 1994 the church bought 7,000 square feet (650 m^{2}), which it used for educational programs, in an office complex. Parish membership increased due to gentrification of Midtown post-1994. By 2004 a 15,000-square-foot (1,400 m^{2}) expansion was under way. In 2004 about 25% of the congregation was ethnic Vietnamese, and there are two masses per week in the Vietnamese language. Therefore, it is one of five Vietnamese Catholic churches in the Houston area.

The former Temple Beth Israel is in Midtown.

== Media ==
The Houston Chronicle is the citywide newspaper. The Midtown Paper is a local area newspaper.

== Gallery ==
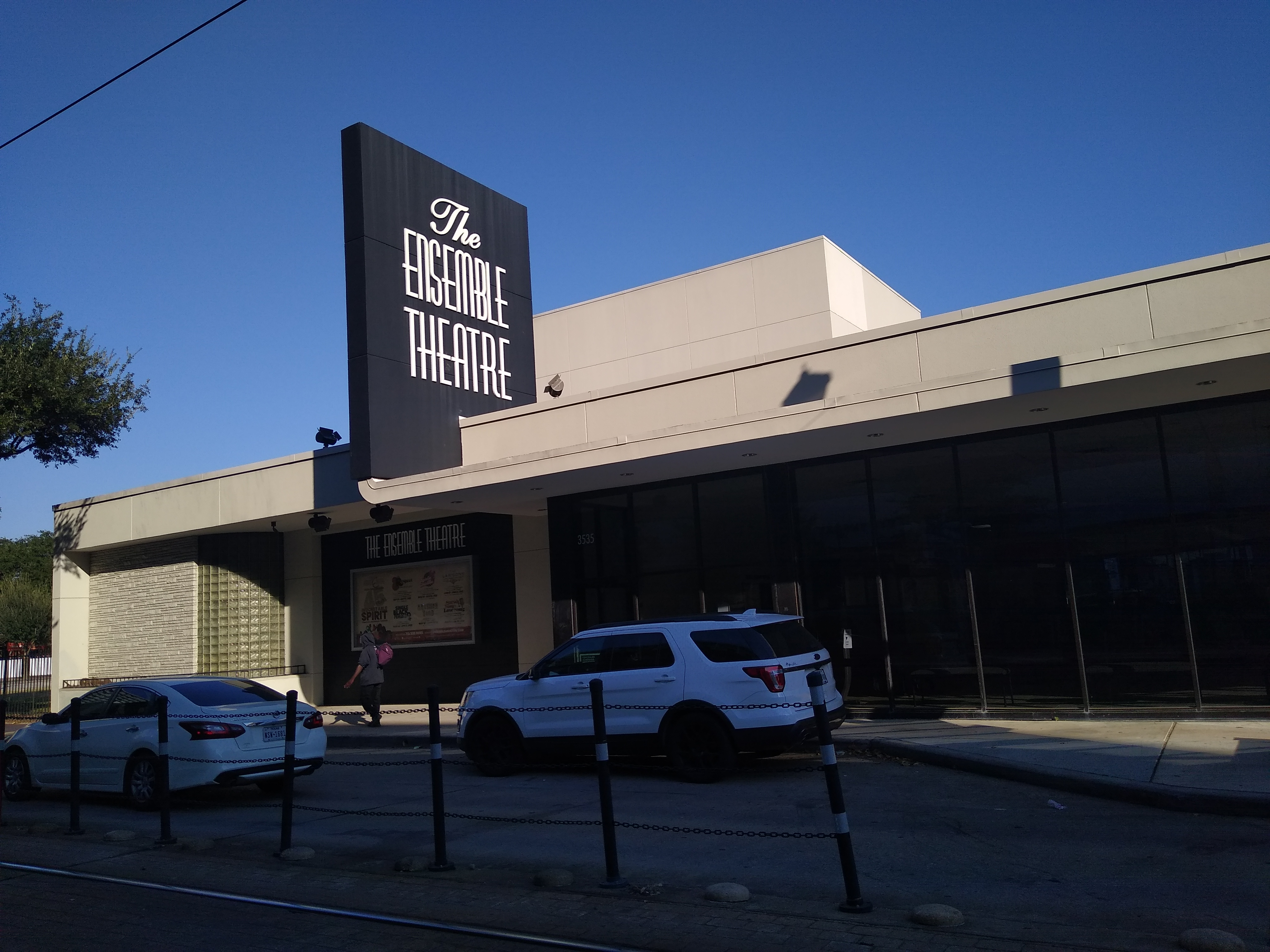
The Ensemble Theatre

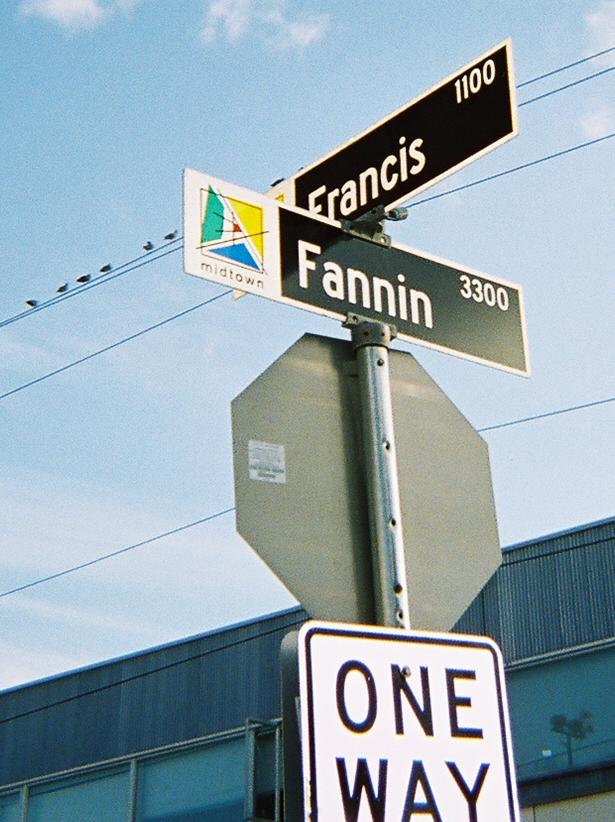
Street signs in Midtown Houston are distinct from the plain green signs seen in most of Houston

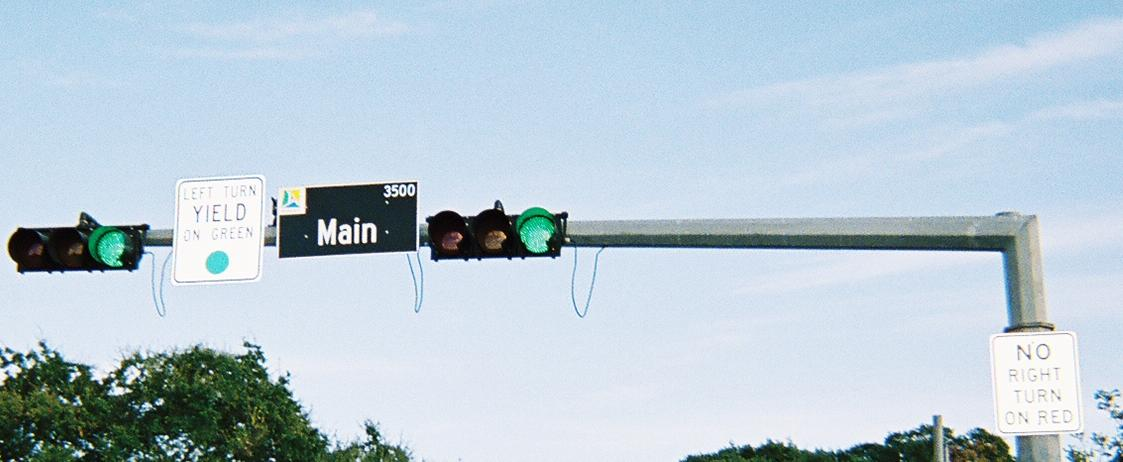
Another example of a Midtown street sign

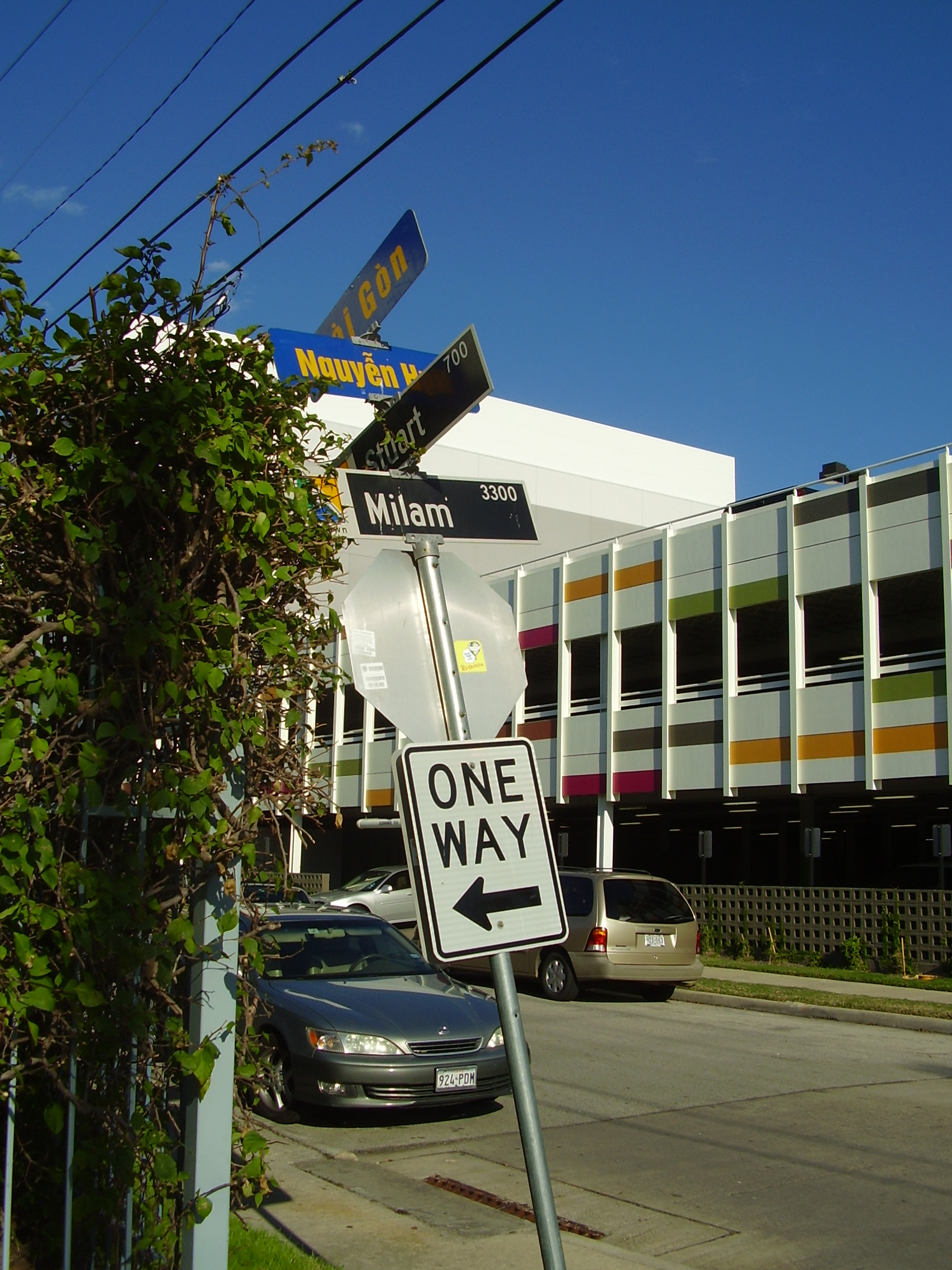
Vietnamese language street signs in Midtown

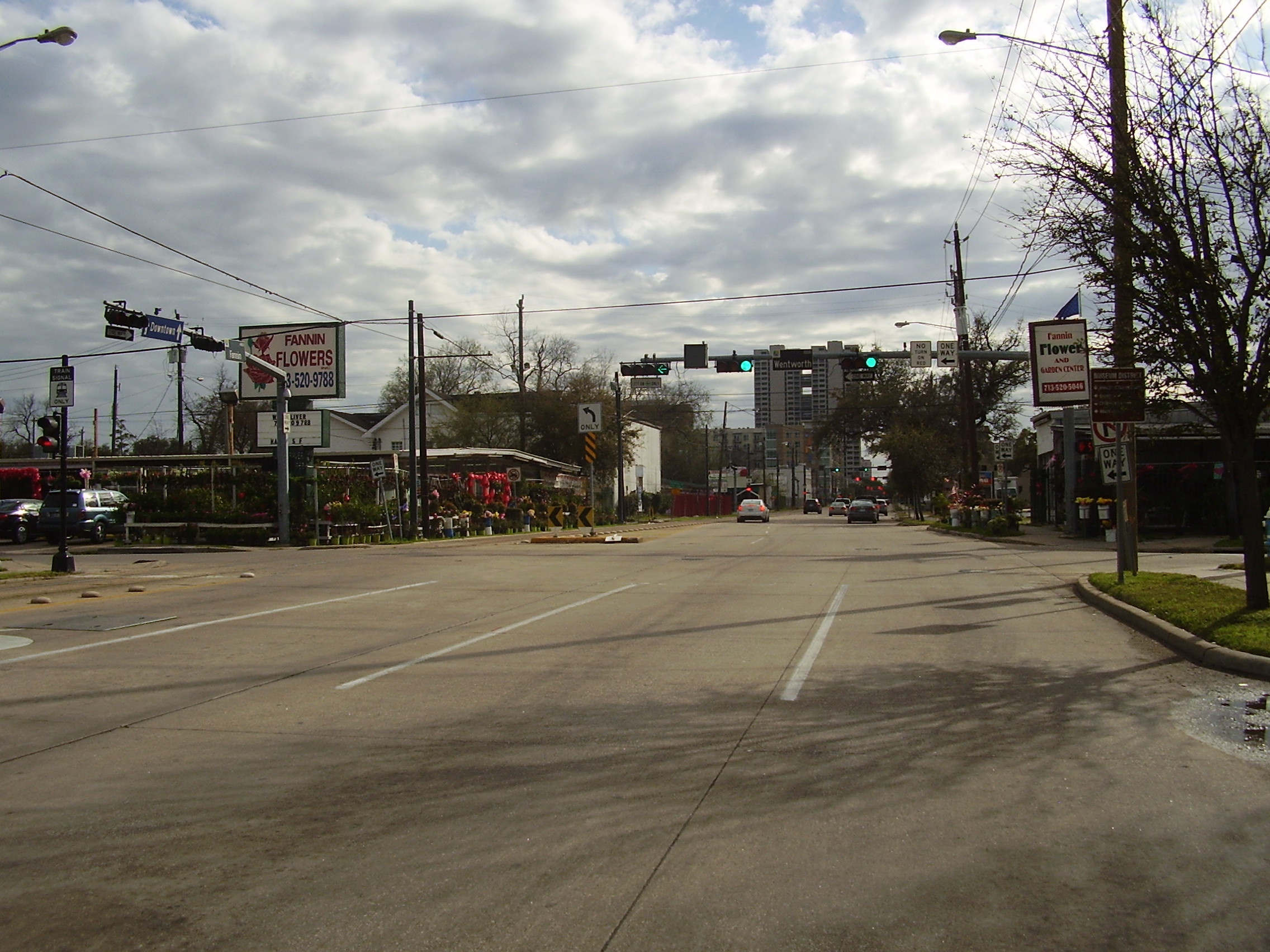
Flower shops in Midtown

== See also ==
- History of the Vietnamese-Americans in Houston
