= The Specialists =

The Specialists may refer to:

- The Specialists (film), a 1969 Italian, French and West German Spaghetti Western film
- The Specialists (TV series), an American animated television series
- The Specialists, a GoldSrc mod for the video game Half-Life
- The Specialists, fictional characters in the television series Winx Club

== See also ==
- Specialist (disambiguation)
