= Isabella Court =

- U.S. National Register of Historic Places
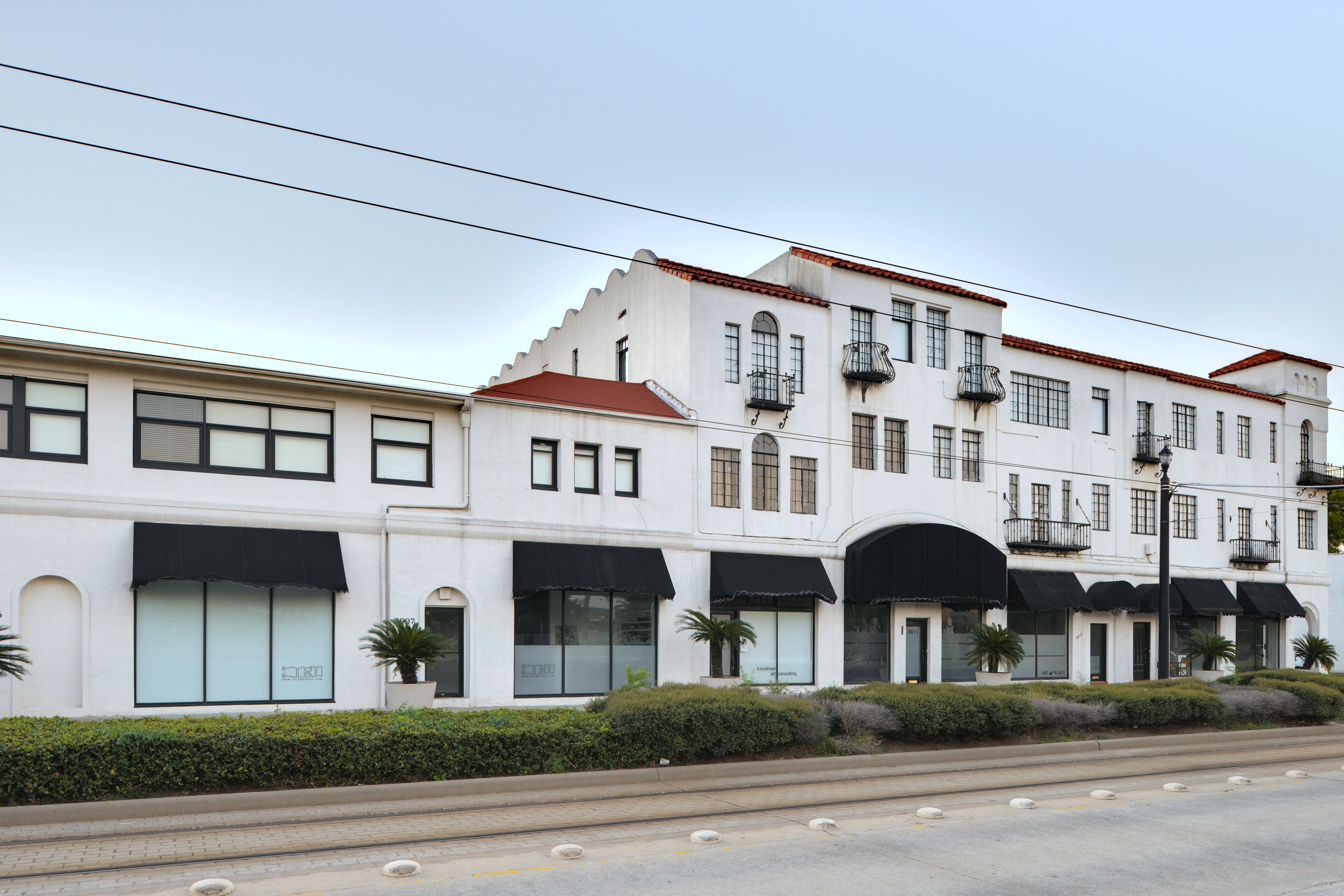
- Isabella Court

- Location within Texas Location within the United States
- Location: 3909-3917 S Main St, Houston, Texas
- Coordinates: 29°44′11″N 95°22′50″W
- Built: 1929
- Architect: William D. Bordeaux
- Architectural style: Mission Revival-Spanish Colonial Revival
- NRHP reference No.: 94000628
- Added to NRHP: June 24, 1994

Isabella Court is a Spanish Colonial Revival style mixed-use residential and commercial complex at 3909-3917 South Main Street in the Midtown district of Houston, Texas, United States. It is listed in the National Register of Historic Places. Isabella Court's residents mainly consist of artists and other professionals. As of 2009 Trudy Hutchings owns the complex.

== History ==
William Bordeaux served as the architect and designed Isabella Court, built during 1928 and 1929, as a Spanish colonial revival-style building. The complex has a courtyard, a stuccoed exterior, and a red tile roof. Isabella Court, which opened in 1929, was designed as a mixed-use building with commercial use on the ground floor and apartments on the upper two floors. During his lifetime, architect Charles W. Moore, author of the excerpts within You Have to Pay for the Public Life, wrote that the "charming" Isabella Court had 'a serious case of what California real estate people call "deferred maintenance."'

In 1991 Trudy Hutchings purchased the complex. On June 24, 1994 Isabella Court received listing in the National Register of Historic Places. Many of the apartment tenants and businesses are oriented towards the arts. For a period during the construction of the METRORail Red Line some businesses left the building. In 2007 the commercial space was fully leased; during that year Houston Press awarded the building the "Best Artistic Renovation."

It is featured in Houston's "Good Brick Tour".

In 2020 the people owning the property requested from the City of Houston protected historic status.

== Features ==
The complex includes multiple balconies.

== Zoned schools ==
Isabella Court is within the Houston Independent School District.

Residents are zoned to MacGregor Elementary School, Gregory-Lincoln Education Center (for middle school), and Lamar High School.

== See also ==
- Midtown, Houston
