= ReBar Houston =

LGBT+ bar in Houston, Texas, U.S.

Rich's Houston
- Rich's
- Former names: Rich's Houston (1983– present)
- Address: 2401 San Jacinto St, Houston, Texas, United States
- Owner: Jeffery Harmon

Construction
- Opened: 1983, 2016, 2023

Website
- www.richshtx.com

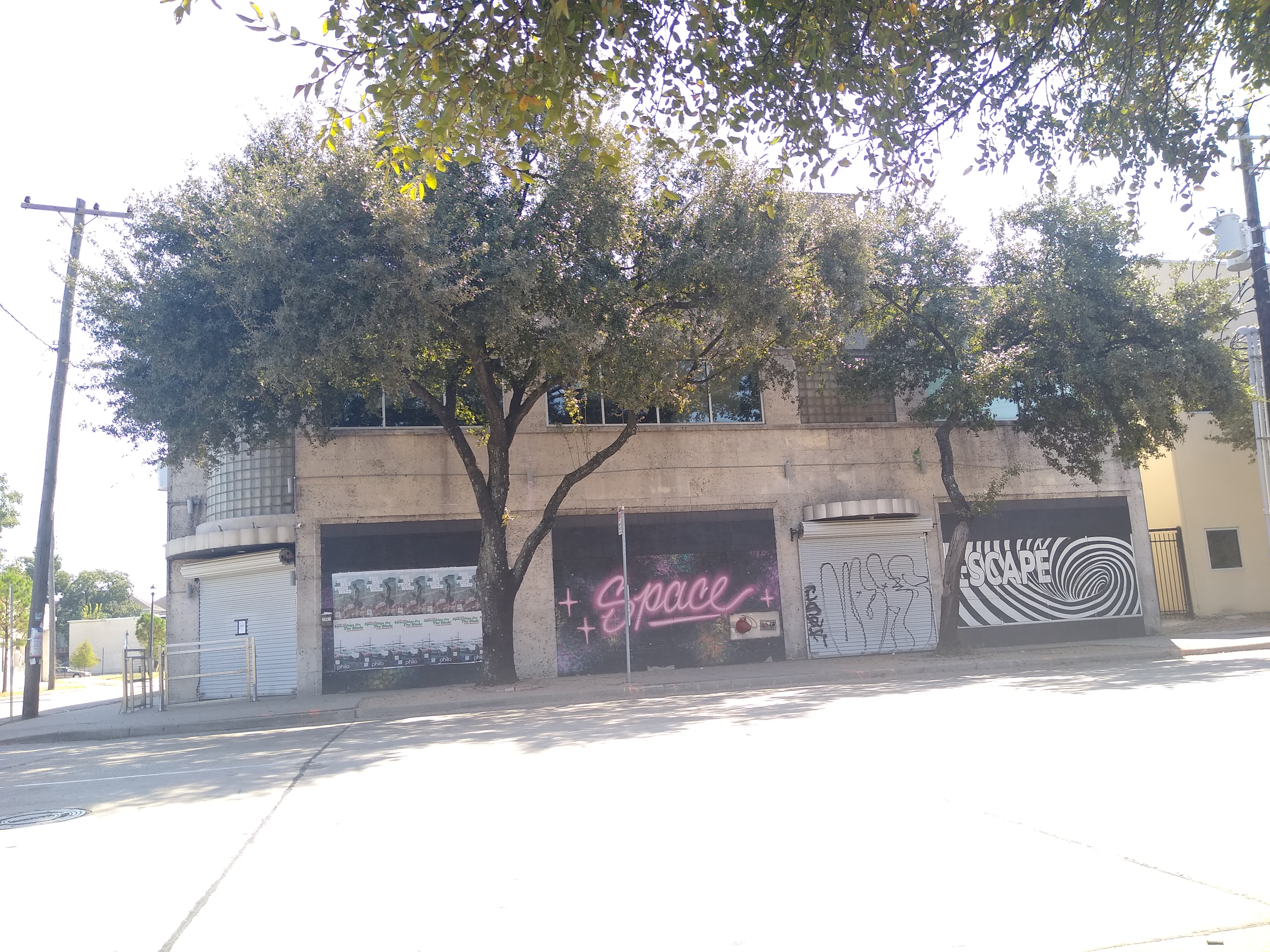
Location of the former Rich's Bar in Houston

Rich's Houston, or simply Rich's, is an music venue, event space, lounge, and nightclub in Neartown, Houston, Texas, United States.

It was established in 1980s, then re-opened in 2016. In 2019, it changed its name from Rich's Houston to ReBar Houston.

It is located in Midtown, in a 14,136-square-foot (1,313.3 m^{2}) facility that formerly housed the Richland Fan Company.
