= Henry Speck =

Canadian Kwakwaka'wakw artist (1908–1971)

Henry Speck (12 August 1908 – 27 May 1971) was a Tlawit'sis (Kwakwaka'wakw) painter, carver, and dancer.

== Personal life ==
Henry Speck (Chief U’dzistalis) was born in 1908 in Kalugwis on Turnour Island, British Columbia. He was raised in the customary practices of the Kwakwaka'wakw Nation, a hereditary chieftainship, where Speck's father, grandfather, and great-grandfather each acted as chief. In 1922, at the age of 14, Henry's uncle, Chief Bob Harris, sponsored him as an initiate in the sacred Hamatsa Society, which practices winter ceremony and dance and is one of the nation's most prestigious groups. Speck worked as fisherman until his father's deaths, at which point he took up the role of chief. He was also a painter, carver, and dancer, eventually teaching ceremonial dance to other initiates.

== Artistic career ==
Chief Henry Speck met Gyula Mayer, a fine art dealer, at Alert Bay, British Columbia. Mayer encouraged Speck and other indigenous artists to experiment with painting on paper, prompting the beginning of a new artistic style which developed alongside the Kwakwaka’wakw "graphic tradition." Mayer then bought their work product. Initially, Speck followed the Kwakawaka'wakw tradition of decorating carvings and other surfaces with graphic painting, namely painting on house screens, masks, blankets, and boxes.

In the 1950s and 60s, North West Coast art experienced a shift towards two-dimensional art, prompting artists to apply their graphic painting style to paper. Speck's two-dimensional works featured minimalist compositional strategies to indicate depth of field, perspective and movement. By combining Kwakwaka'wakw cosmology with modernist aesthetics, his work was both documentary and abstracted.

In 1964, Gyula Mayer organised Speck's first solo exhibition at the New Design Gallery in Vancouver, British Columbia. He was one of the earliest artists to produce silkscreen prints from his paintings through BC Indian Designs Ltd. Speck also exhibited at the Simon Fraser University Museum of Archaeology and Ethnology and his work is included in the collections of the National Gallery of Canada, the Royal British Columbia Museum, the Canadian Museum of History, the Glenbow Museum, the Museum of Us, and the Campbell River Museum.

In 2013, some of his watercolours were exhibited at the UBC Museum of Anthropology's Satellite Gallery, curated by Marcia Crosby and Karen Duffek. In this exhibit, Projections: The Paintings of Henry Speck, Uzdi’stalis, the artist's complex relationships to Indigenous modernism were at play. Because Speck's work was seen as representational, he had not been included in the category "Indigenous modernism" used to categorize some of his contemporaries.

In 1965, he became artistic director of Chief James Sewid's Kwakiutl House project in Alert Bay.

== Death ==
Henry Speck died on May 27, 1971, in Alert Bay, British Columbia.
