= Special adviser =

Special adviser may refer to:

- Special adviser (Norway), a high-ranking civil servant
- Special adviser (UK), a political appointee who assists a government minister
- Special Adviser, title of some Under-Secretaries-General of the United Nations

== See also ==
- Senior advisor
