= Specialist =

A specialist is someone who is an expert in, or devoted to, some specific branch of study or research.

Specialist may also refer to:

== Occupations ==
- Specialist (rank), military rank
  - Specialist (Singapore)
- Specialist officer, military rank in Sweden
- Specialist law enforcement agency
- Specialist (arena football)
- Specialist degree, in academia
- Specialty (medicine)
- Payload specialist, a Space Shuttle crew member with duties associated with a flight's payload

== Arts and entertainment ==
- "Specialist" (short story), a 1953 science fiction story by Robert Sheckley
- The Specialists (TV series), a 1992 animated series that appeared as part of MTV's Liquid Television
- Specialist (TV series), a 2016 Japanese drama
- "Specialist", a song by Interpol from the B-side of Turn On the Bright Lights
- The Specialist (1975 film), an American thriller film
- The Specialist, a 1994 American action film
- The Specialist (comics) (Lo Sconosciuto), an Italian comic
- The Specialist, a book by Charles "Chic" Sale

== Other uses ==
- Specialist (computer), a Soviet DIY computer design
- Specialist species, a species that thrives best in a particular habitat, or has a limited diet
- Specialists' Shopping Centre, Singapore
- Specialist status, a status given to schools in the United Kingdom

== See also ==
- Specialization (disambiguation)
- Special adviser (disambiguation)
- The Specialists (disambiguation)
