= Lucas Quiroz =

Argentine footballer

Personal information
- Full name: Lucas Alberto Quiroz
- Date of birth: 27 January 1997 (age 29)
- Place of birth: Rafaela, Argentina
- Position: Midfielder

Team information
- Current team: 9 de Julio

Youth career
- Atlético de Rafaela

Senior career*
Years	Team	Apps	(Gls)
2016–2020	Atlético de Rafaela	7	(0)
2019	→ Central Norte (loan)	14	(4)
2020	→ Ben Hur (loan)	3	(1)
2020	Unión Sunchales	4	(0)
2021–	9 de Julio		
- * Club domestic league appearances and goals

Lucas Alberto Quiroz (born 27 January 1997) is an Argentine professional footballer who plays as a midfielder for 9 de Julio.

== Career ==
Quiroz began his career with Atlético de Rafaela. He appeared in a matchday squad for the first time in June 2016 for a Copa Argentina tie with Ferro Carril Oeste, though he wasn't selected off the bench by Juan Manuel Llop. He was again an unused sub in the cup two years later against Defensores de Belgrano, which preceded his professional debut arriving on 27 August 2018 in a Primera B Nacional win over Quilmes. January 2019 saw Quiroz depart on loan to Central Norte. He scored four goals in fourteen Torneo Regional Federal Amateur matches.

In January 2020, a second loan to the fourth tier was confirmed as he joined Ben Hur. One goal in three matches arrived, in a campaign that was stopped due to the COVID-19 pandemic. In the succeeding August, Quiroz terminated his contract with Rafaela.

== Career statistics ==
As of 2 October 2020.

Club statistics
Club	Season	League			Cup		League Cup		Continental		Other		Total	
Club	Season	Division	Apps	Goals	Apps	Goals	Apps	Goals	Apps	Goals	Apps	Goals	Apps	Goals
Atlético de Rafaela	2016	Primera División	0	0	0	0	—		—		0	0	0	0
Atlético de Rafaela	2016–17	Primera División	0	0	0	0	—		—		0	0	0	0
Atlético de Rafaela	2017–18	Primera B Nacional	0	0	0	0	—		—		0	0	0	0
Atlético de Rafaela	2018–19	Primera B Nacional	7	0	0	0	—		—		0	0	7	0
Atlético de Rafaela	2019–20	Primera B Nacional	0	0	0	0	—		—		0	0	0	0
Atlético de Rafaela	Total		7	0	0	0	—		—		0	0	7	0
Central Norte (loan)	2019	Torneo Amateur	14	4	0	0	—		—		0	0	14	4
Ben Hur (loan)	2020	Torneo Amateur	3	1	0	0	—		—		0	0	3	1
Career total			24	5	0	0	—		—		0	0	24	5
