= Speck (printing) =

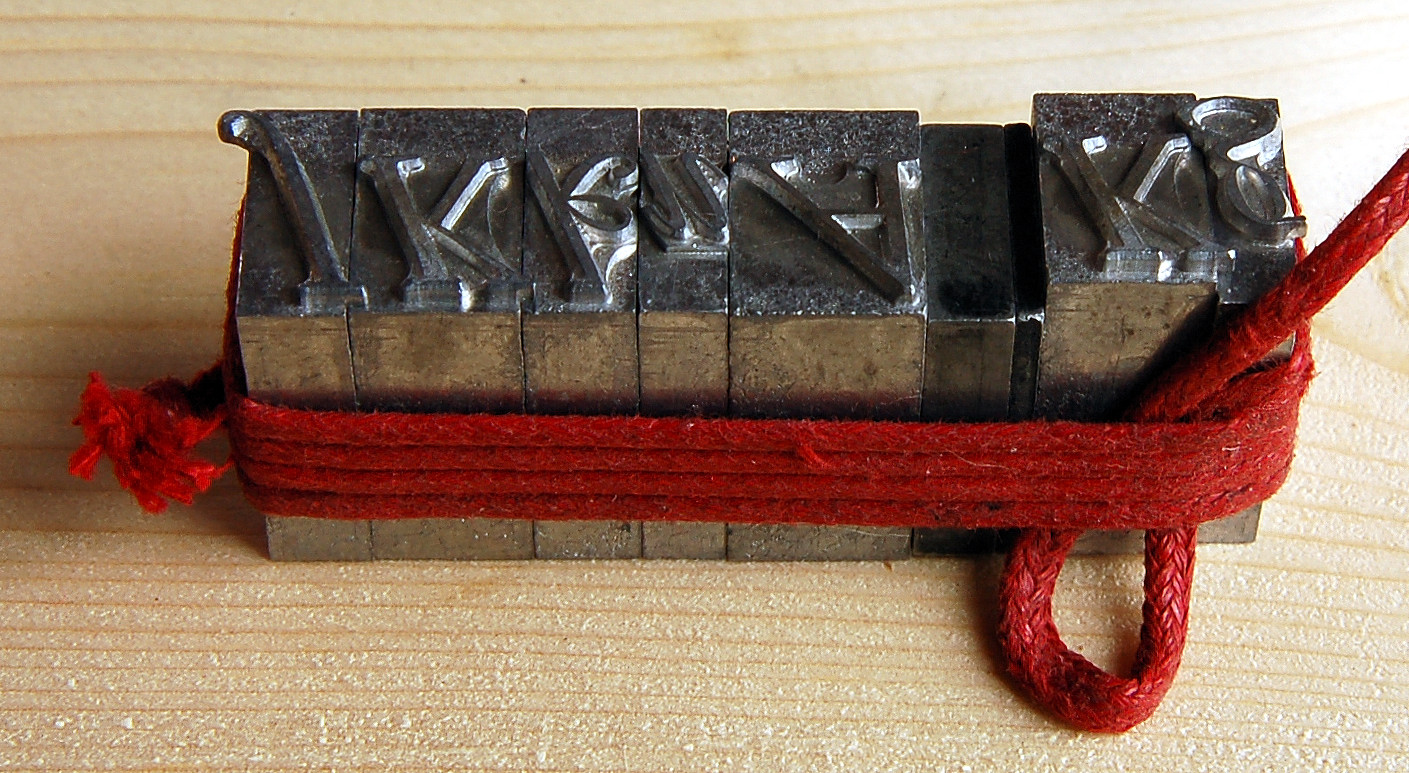
Bound preset added to Speck

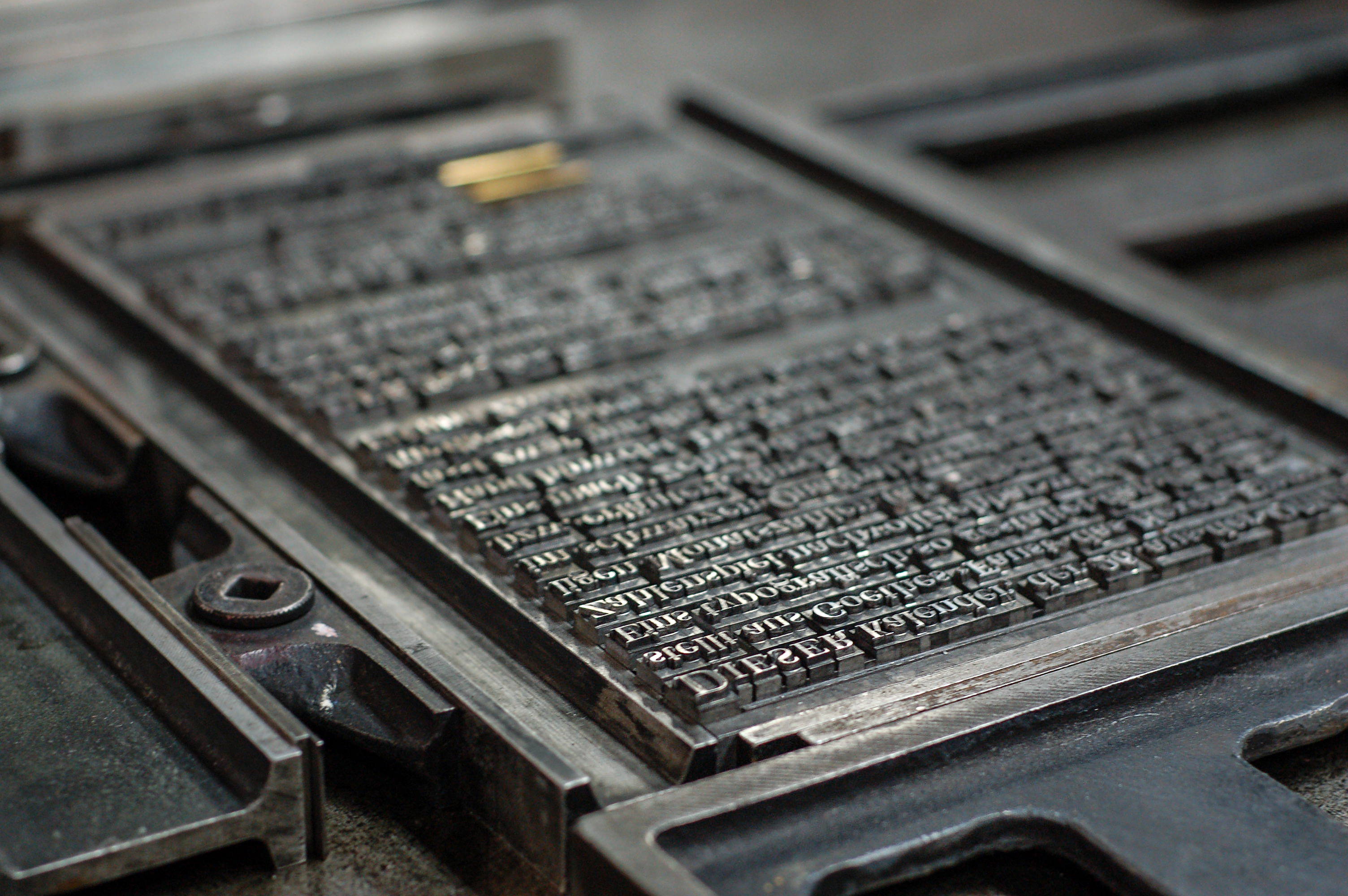
Set ready for Hot metal typesetting

Speck (figuratively for German speck or bacon) in the German typesetting tradition describes a manuscript that is printed with low effort. The term is still used in electronic publishing.

== Background ==
The usage is related to printing paid for as piece work. Manuscripts with a low amount of text, high amount of pictures, free space or halftitles and preset sections were described with the term. They were more easily finished, but allowed the typesetter to earn the same amount as complicated pages with a large amount of new letters. (Compare potboiler for authors.) A typesetter who fobbed off complicated manuscripts on others and preferred "Speck" was called a Speckjäger (Speck hunter).
