= Spec's Wine, Spirits & Finer Foods =

Liquor store chain in Texas, United States

- Founded: 1962
- Headquarters: Houston, Texas

Spec's Wine, Spirits & Finer Foods, is a Texas family-owned liquor store chain, with headquarters in Midtown, Houston.

Vicki Vaughn of the San Antonio Express-News said that Spec's is "known for its sprawling stores". It is the largest vendor of liquor in Greater Houston. Dale Robertson of the Houston Chronicle said that Spec's was "Houston’s 800-pound wine gorilla." As of 2010 Spec's is the fifth largest retailer of wine in the United States.

== History ==
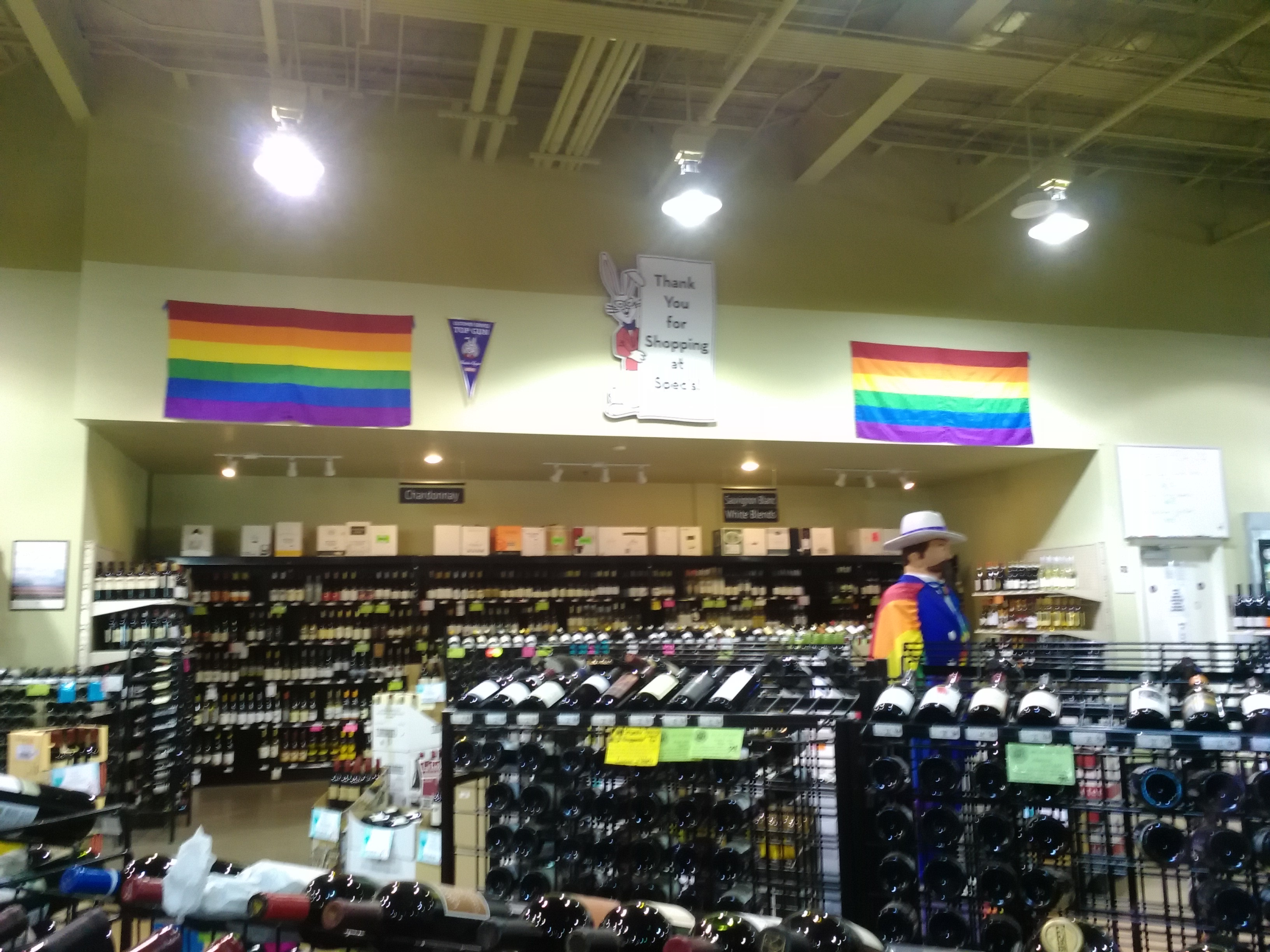
Interior of Spec's in Montrose

The original Spec's opened in 1962 in the Fifth Ward, Houston. Carroll B. "Spec" Jackson and Carolynn Jackson founded the store. "Spec" Jackson wanted to work for himself and make enough money so Carolynn would not have to work. The store's name originated from his nickname, "Spec's," referring to his eye spectacles. "Spec" Jackson spent $7,000 to have his first store opened.

Originally Spec's sold only beer and liquor and functioned as a neighborhood liquor store. 96% of the inventory consisted of liquor. After several years the operations produced a consistent profit. "Spec" Jackson decided to expand the chain. Ten years after the owner decided to expand, Spec's had 16 Greater Houston locations.

In 1996 the Jacksons died, with one dying six months after the other. Lindy Rydman, the daughter of the Jacksons, and her husband John Rydman took ownership of the chain. After a customer suggested that Spec's carry snacks, Spec's began to offer delicatessen items. In 2002 the chain had 475 employees and 24 stores in Greater Houston.

In 2008 Spec's acquired Palms Liquor in Galveston, giving the chain its first Galveston store. In 2009 Spec's announced plans to open a store in Live Oak, giving the chain its first store in Greater San Antonio. After the City of Killeen legalized the sale of packaged liquor at the end of 2010, Spec's scheduled the opening of its Killeen store on August 5, 2011. The chain's first location in the Dallas/Fort Worth Metroplex opened on December 19, 2011 in Dallas. Goody Goody Liquor, a family liquor store company based in Dallas, responded to Spec's entering the DFW market by entering the Houston market.

For eight consecutive years, the Houston Press gave Spec's the "Best Liquor Store" award.

== Corporate affairs ==
John Rydman, as of 2011, is the company's president, and he and Lindy Rydman currently operate Spec's. Their only child, Lisa, is vice president of marketing.

The chain's headquarters are located in Store #00 Downtown Location in Midtown, Houston, near Downtown.

=== Philanthropy ===
The Spec's Charitable Foundation, established in 1996, supports educational programs. Spec's holds an annual event, the Vintage Virtuoso dinner and wine tasting, which benefits the Houston Symphony.

== Locations ==
As of 2013 Spec's has over 165 stores. They are primarily located in Greater Houston, Greater Austin, and Greater Corpus Christi. As of 2012 the largest Spec's branch location is the 55,000-square-foot (5,100 m^{2}) Bryant Irvin location in Fort Worth. The chain also has locations in the Beaumont/Port Arthur area, College Station, Killeen, Greater San Antonio, Victoria, El Paso, and Lubbock.

=== Store #00 Downtown ===
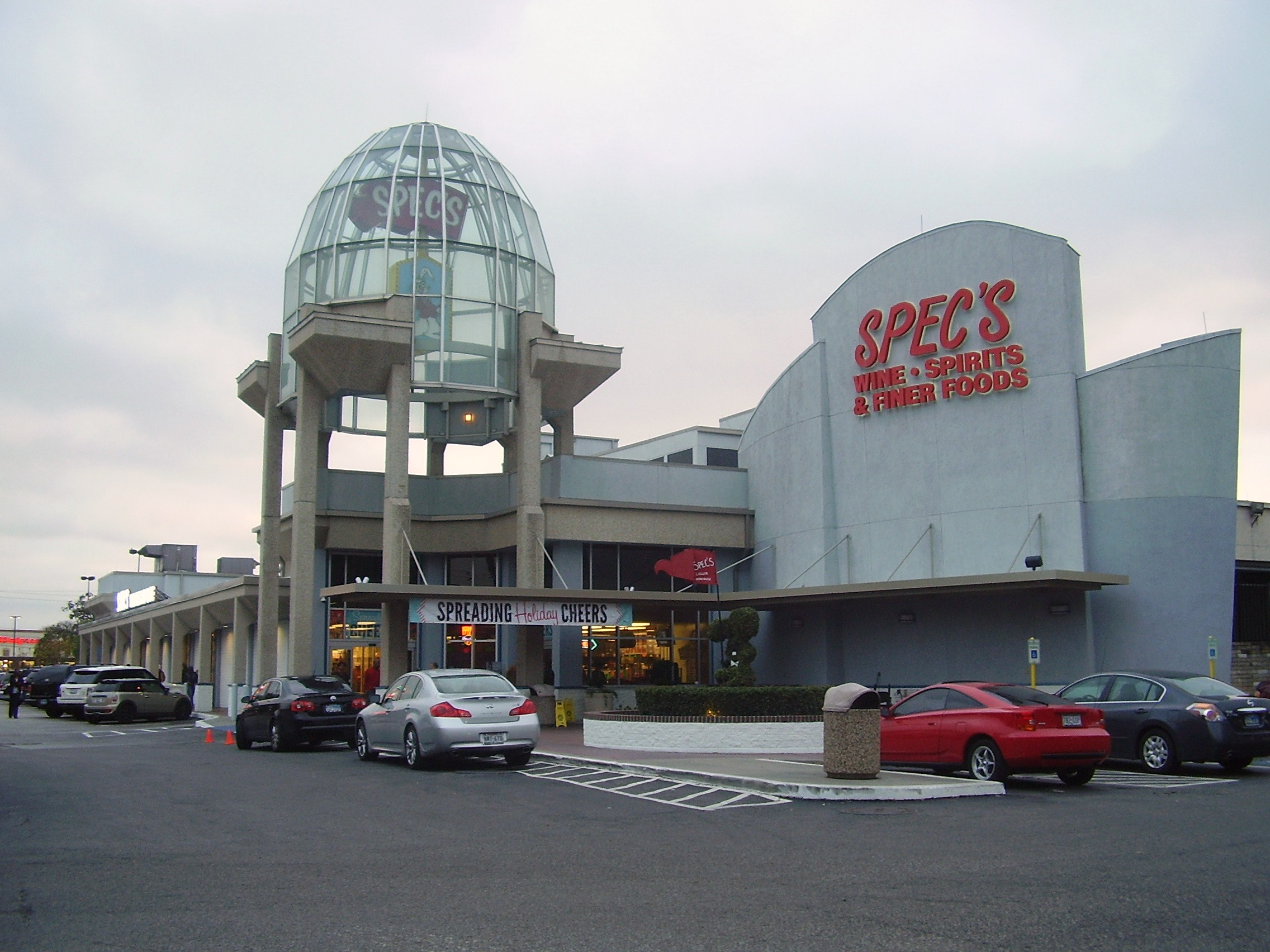
Spec's Store #00 Downtown, which houses the corporate headquarters, is the flagship store

The 83,780-square-foot (7,783 m^{2}) main Houston store (Store #00 Downtown) includes, in addition to offices, 40,000 square feet (3,700 m^{2}) of retail area, a temperature-controlled wine storage area, and a training room. It occupies over three city blocks. As of 2011 it has 200 employees.

Its wine and liquor section, taking up 15,000 square feet (1,400 m^{2}) of space, has over 10,000 varieties of liqueurs, spirits, and wine. The store houses a 95-foot (29 m) beer cooler, which has 35 doors, and a walk-in cigar humidor, which has 900 varieties of cigars. The full service delicatessen takes up 8,000 square feet (740 m^{2}) of space. Items at the delicatessen include caviar, over 1,000 varieties of American and foreign cheeses, crackers, on-site roasted whole bean coffees, condiments, smoked fish, jams, jellies, oils, pastas, pasta sauces, and vinegars. The store offers sandwiches made on-site. The store also includes a bakery, with bread imported from France. The original Houston store has 21,000 specialty food stock-keeping units (SKU). They account for 11% of the store's sales. Nicole Potenza-Denis of the Specialty Food Magazine said that the Downtown location, which the Rydman family calls the "mothership" store, is "reportedly the largest single wine and liquor store in the world."

The store had been expanded to its current size in the 2000s, as part of the Rydmans' celebration of the chain's 40th anniversary. As part of the expansion, Spec's purchased two pieces of land on both sides of the warehouse and pieces of land along the streets between the warehouse, adding one block of land. John Rydman said that it would have been easier for Spec's to build a new store and warehouse on another city block, rather than renovate the original store and warehouse, but "we are locked on retaining the original warehouse and we want to preserve the look and feel we currently have." The original wine storage facility was several blocks away; he said that was not sufficiently efficient.
