= Specialization =

Specialization or Specialized may refer to:

== Academia ==
- Academic specialization, may be a course of study or major at an academic institution or may refer to the field in which a specialist practices
- Specialty (medicine), a branch of medical practice

== Biology ==
- Cellular differentiation, the process by which a less specialized cell becomes a more specialized cell type
- Specialty (medicine), a branch of medical science
- Generalist and specialist species, in biology and ecology

== Computer science ==
- Partial template specialization, a particular form of class template specialization
- Template specialization, a style of computer programming which allows alternative implementations to be provided based on certain characteristics of the parameterized type that is being instantiated

== Economics and industry ==
- Departmentalization, refers to the process of grouping activities into departments
- Division of labour, the specialization of cooperative labour in specific, circumscribed tasks and roles
- Economic specialization, the separation of tasks within an economy
- Flexible Specialization (Post-Fordism), a name given to the dominant system of economic production, consumption and associated socio-economic phenomena, in most industrialized countries since the late 20th century
- Network governance, also known as Flexible Specialization

== Linguistics ==
- Specialization (linguistics)
- Specialized English, a controlled version of the English language used for radio broadcasting, easier for non-native speakers

== Mathematics ==
- Specialization (pre)order, a natural preorder on the set of the points of a topological space
- Ring of symmetric functions#Specializations, an algebra homomorphism from the ring of symmetric functions to a commutative algebra.
- Specialization (logic)

== Organizations ==
- SCT Logistics, transport company in Australia that formally traded as Specialised Container Transport
- Specialised Technical Committees of the African Union
- Specialized Technology Resources, an American corporation headquartered in Enfield, Connecticut
- Specialized System Consultants, a private media company that publishes magazines and reference manuals
- Specialized Bicycle Components, a company making bicycles and bicycle components

== Psychology ==
- Cognitive specialization, refers to the theory that learning certain skills inhibits the ability to learn related but dissimilar skills
- Interactive specialization, a theory of brain development

== Other uses ==
- Specialized Mobile Radio, analog or digital trunked two-way radio system

== See also ==
- Specialist (disambiguation)
