= Boruto: Naruto Next Generations episodes 1–52 =

- Series 1
- Cover of the first home media box set release of the series featuring Sarada Uchiha, Boruto Uzumaki and Mitsuki.
- No. of episodes: 52

Release
- Original network: TV Tokyo
- Original release: April 5, 2017 – April 4, 2018

Series chronology
- Next → List 2 (#53–104)

Boruto: Naruto Next Generations is a Japanese anime series based on the manga series of the same name and is a spin-off and sequel to Masashi Kishimoto's Naruto. It is produced by Pierrot and broadcast on TV Tokyo. The anime is directed by Noriyuki Abe (#1–104 (Note: Chief Director)), and Hiroyuki Yamashita (#1–66) and is written by Makoto Uezu (#1–66). Former manga writer Ukyō Kodachi supervised the story until episode 216 And after that the Manga will be written by Masashi Kishimoto itself.

Boruto follows the exploits of Naruto Uzumaki's son Boruto and his comrades from the Hidden Leaf Village's ninja academy as they seek their path in life. Despite being based on the manga, the anime also explores original storylines and adaptations of the spin-off manga, Naruto: The Seventh Hokage and the Scarlet Spring; Boruto: Naruto the Movie; and the Naruto Shinden light novel series.

It premiered on TV Tokyo on April 5, 2017, and aired every Wednesday at 5:55 PM JST. The series is also released on DVD. Viz Media licensed the series on March 23, 2017, for simulcast streaming on Hulu, and Crunchyroll.

In the United States, the English dub made its premiere on Adult Swim's Toonami programming block on September 29, 2018. Adult Swim removed the series from the block's rotation after episode 52 on October 20, 2019. Adult Swim executive Jason DeMarco addressed on Twitter that they currently have no plans to bring the anime back.

The opening theme songs are "Baton Road" by Kana-Boon (episodes 1–26), "Over" by Little Glee Monster (episodes 27–51), and "It's All in the Game" by Qyoto (episodes 52–75).

The ending theme songs are "Dreamy Journey" by the Peggies (episodes 1–13), "Sayonara Moon Town" by Scenarioart (episodes 14–26), "Boku wa Hashiritsuzukeru" by Melofloat (episodes 27–39), "Denshin Tamashii" by Game Jikkyō-sha Wakuwaku Band (episodes 40–51), and "Kachō Fūgetsu" by Coalamode (episodes 52–63).

== Episode list ==
No.	Title (Note: All English titles are taken from Crunchyroll.)	Directed by	Written by	Original release date	English air date
1	"Boruto Uzumaki!"; Transliteration: "Uzumaki Boruto!!" (Japanese: うずまきボルト!!)	Hiroyuki Yamashita	Makoto Uezu	April 5, 2017	September 29, 2018
Years before Boruto Uzumaki's fight against an evil young man named Kawaki, the young Boruto and Shikadai Nara ride on top of a train with the latter reminding Boruto that tomorrow is their Academy entrance ceremony. Boruto sees a boy being bullied and defends him. They talk about their fathers with the boy, Denki Kaminarimon, revealing his father is a billionaire businessman in charge of the Hidden Leaf's train system. Boruto encourages him to stand up to his father. Boruto returns home and is unsurprised to hear that his father, Naruto Uzumaki, is absent. Meanwhile, Denki tries to stand up for himself but his father rejects him, saying Denki will win his approval by being strong. The next morning, Boruto is running late for the ceremony and sees Denki being controlled by an evil aura. Denki lures the bullies on a broken train and sends it driving towards another train with the intent of scaring them. Boruto intervenes and snaps Denki back to his senses, and manages to avoid the collision. However the train ends up crashing into Hokage's stone face and Boruto has been suspended for two weeks. The two become friends as they attend the Academy after two weeks later.
2	"The Hokage's Son!"; Transliteration: "Hokage no musuko...!!" (Japanese: 火影の息子...!!)	Ayumu Ono	Kiyomune Miwa Makoto Uezu	April 12, 2017	October 6, 2018
After having been suspended for two weeks for nearly destroying the Hokage face monument, Boruto begins his education at the academy. Once starting in the academy, Boruto starts clashing with an older student named Iwabe Yuino who has been picking on Denki. This causes the two of them to have a one-on-one battle during their break.
3	"Metal Lee Goes Wild!"; Transliteration: "Bōsō, Metaru Rī!!" (Japanese: 暴走、メタル・リー!!)	Nobuyoshi Nagayama	Hideto Tanaka Makoto Uezu	April 19, 2017	October 13, 2018
Shikadai realizes he has been too harsh with his classmate Metal Lee, who is always nervous when in front of other students. After Shikadai consults his father, Shikamaru Nara, he decides to apologize to him. However, the next day, Lee is possessed by the same dark aura that affected Denki. He attacks his classmates as Boruto's right eye notes a strange change with his chakra. After succeeding at making Lee recover, Shikadai and Lee reconciling and become friends.
4	"A Ninjutsu Battle of the Sexes!"; Transliteration: "Danjo taikō ninjutsu gassen!!" (Japanese: 男女対抗忍術合戦!!)	Hikari Satō	Masahiro Ōkubo	April 26, 2017	October 20, 2018
When Boruto and Sarada Uchiha start antagonizing each other, causing their teacher Shino Aburame to suggest his students in engaging in a battle divided between sexes.
5	"The Mysterious Transfer Student!"; Transliteration: "Nazo no tenkōsei...!!" (Japanese: 謎の転校生...!!)	Yōji Satō	Kōjiro Nakamura Kō Shigenobu	May 3, 2017	October 27, 2018
A new student named Mitsuki joins the academy. While friendly, he is often considered too dangerous due to his refusal to hold back during sparring sessions with his classmates. Meanwhile, Shino starts seeing himself as a failure to his class.
6	"The Final Lesson!"; Transliteration: "Saigo no jugyō...!!" (Japanese: 最後の授業...!!)	Hodaka Kuramoto	Kō Shigenobu	May 10, 2017	November 3, 2018
Shino is possessed by the dark aura, hits his breaking point, and fights Boruto with Shikadai and Mitsuki being trapped in the forest. However, Mitsuki is hiding something that is not yet known to the other two. After Shino comes back to his senses, he saves Mitsuki and Boruto from drowning and reports back to the Hokage's office. Naruto realizes a dangerous situation is brewing and orders Shino to investigate.
7	"Love and Potato Chips!"; Transliteration: "Koi to potechi...!!" (Japanese: 恋とポテチ...!!)	Kodaira Maki	Hideto Tanaka	May 17, 2017	November 10, 2018
While walking down the streets, Sarada, Cho-Cho and Sumire realize that someone is tailing them. As they cannot find anyone, they assume that someone is stalking Cho-Cho. But, the next day, when that person tries to stalk them again Cho-Cho catches him. At that moment Boruto, Shikadai and Mitsuki are nearby so they go there after hearing the stalker's scream. The stalker turns out to be Magire, a student from another class who has a crush on Sumire. So, Cho-Cho pushes him to propose to her but Sumire politely rejects him. At the academy, Magire kidnaps Sumire, so Boruto and the others go to save her. Upon meeting him on the roof, Boruto sees the same mysterious shadow around him, and hence plans to knock him out but finds it difficult due to Magire's disguise Jutsu. Magire reveals that Sumire was the only girl who ever talked to him, but Cho-Cho makes him realize that the reason why people didn't talk to him was because of his own weakness. Boruto observes that the shadow around Magire disappears without needing to defeat him. Despite that, Magire faints afterwards. At the Hokage's office, Naruto receives reports of people losing chakra for some unknown reason.
8	"The Dream's Revelation"; Transliteration: "Yume no otsuge" (Japanese: 夢のお告げ)	Matsuki Keiichi	Kiyomune Miwa	May 24, 2017	November 24, 2018
Boruto goes to watch a ninja film with Shikadai, Iwabe, and Denki. Boruto talks to Shikadai about the mysterious shadow that only he can see. Shikadai advises him to tell the elders about it but Boruto plans to handle this matter all by himself. Later, Boruto makes three Shadow Clones of himself to discuss about the mysterious shadow with himself but in the end gets confused and questions whether he really saw the shadow or was it just him hallucinating. His clones also advise him that he should tell the elders but Boruto still wants to solve this himself. In a dream, a mysterious man tells him that he will shoulder the fate of world with his eye. After waking up Boruto sees his eye in a mirror and believes that he has awakened the Byakugan. Naruto gets tired because of work so Shikamaru comes to drop him home only to find Boruto acting like the ninja movie's hero. Boruto tells everyone that he has awakened the Byakugan but Naruto says that he never trained enough to awaken the Byakugan. Instead, Hinata tells him to meet her father, Hiashi. Naruto takes Himawari and Boruto to the Hyuga's place where they meet Hiashi, who also admits that even in the Hyuga clan not everyone can awaken the Byakugan but offers to personally spar with Boruto to check its validity.
9	"Proof of Oneself"; Transliteration: "Jibun no shōmei" (Japanese: 自分の証明)	Ayumu Ono	Kiyomune Miwa	May 31, 2017	December 1, 2018
Hiashi plans to have a match with Boruto to find out whether he has really awakened the Byakugan but Hanabi offers to fight him instead, stating that he will not hold back against Boruto. The match between Hanabi and Boruto commences and Boruto quickly gets defeated by his aunt, even after using his shadow clones. Boruto asks for another match with Hanabi but gets defeated again after trying very hard. Hanabi does not see any signs of Byakugan during their matches so she assumes that he did not awaken the Byakugan yet. Hiashi asks Naruto and the others to stay at their place that night because Boruto gets exhausted. Later, after dinner, Naruto and Hiashi have a private talk about Boruto, and Naruto tells him that he believes in Boruto even though he did hasn't awaken the Byakugan yet because Boruto would not be trying so hard if he was lying about it. Hanabi goes to talk with Boruto while he recalls his dream. Boruto tells her that Naruto and the elders probably think that he is lying. Hanabi admits that she does not know about what the others are thinking but promises him that she will help him whenever he needs her help. The next day, Boruto goes to the market because he did not eat his dinner properly, where he meets Sarada. While he talks to her, he spots a person with the mysterious shadow. So, he goes after him only to discover that this person is "Kagemasa", the hero of the movie he watched in the previous episode. He discovers that Kagemasa had become chubby which had caused the production company to cancel his film's sequel. Boruto fights Kagemasa, and as he is about to get defeated by him, Sarada comes to save him and they defeat him together. The next day, at the academy, Boruto tells Shikadai and Mitsuki that he will not be able to prove that he has awakened the Byakugan but he will continue to look for a way to make everyone believe him.
10	"The Ghost Incident: The Investigation Begins!"; Transliteration: "Gōsuto jiken, sōsa kaishi!!" (Japanese: ゴースト事件、捜査開始!!)	Masatoyo Takada	Masaya Honda	June 7, 2017	December 8, 2018
Boruto has been skipping classes at the academy along with Shikadai and Mitsuki to find someone possessed by the mysterious shadow, only to learn his mother Hinata learned about it once he got home. The next day, Hinata meets Shino at the academy where he lectures Boruto that he will end up in the after-school tutoring sessions if continues to skip classes. Later, Shino tells the class that they will be doing work experience, and students have freedom to select any workplace they want. Boruto, Shikadai, and Mitsuki select the Post Office as their workplace as this allows them to roam around the village to find the mysterious shadow. Then, after delivering some mail, Boruto meets Naruto and Naruto tells him to deliver the mail with care; Boruto disregards this. Mitsuki tells the team that he has found someone possessed by the mysterious shadow on the other side of the village, the effort to reach the other side of town drains their chakra. At the Hokage's office, Sai reports Naruto that he has found evidence of the uses of Wood Style at the locations where people are getting possessed, and suggests that members of the disbanded Foundation could be behind this. Naruto advised Sai to be careful about this if members of the Foundation are involved. Later while Naruto is packing spare clothes for the office, Hinata helps him pack while he tells her that because he spent his childhood without a father, he does not know how to act like one; Hinata assures him that Boruto understands his feelings. The next day, when Boruto, Shikadai and Mitsuki return to the Post Office, the Bureau Chief Komame tells them of the complaints he received from all the places where Boruto delivered mail yesterday; punishing the group with counting stamps. Later, Boruto watches the news which shows a person possessed by the shadow. Boruto sees that the person has barricaded himself in the Water Purification Plant where Sumire and the two other girls from his class had gone for their work experience; Boruto rushes to save them.
11	"The Shadow of The Mastermind"; Transliteration: "Kuromaku no kage" (Japanese: 黒幕の影)	Hikari Satō	Masaya Honda	June 14, 2017	December 15, 2018
The episode starts out in the hospital where the Class Representative is recovering from her injuries with many people from the class visiting her for well-wishing. Naruto shows up and leads Boruto and his friends to another part of the hospital where the man who was possessed by the shadow is in intensive care. Naruto says that the man's chakra was almost completely drained out of him, and that this investigation has become a serious matter, not for kids playing detective. The three of them return to the post office to continue their part-time jobs as delivery boys. On the route, Mitsuki informs Boruto and Shikadai that there has been another shadow attack. They go to investigate, but they are always just behind the village police who are now investigating the matter. The rest of their class shows up at the post office to help, and they run off; however, the minute they leave the shadow appears and possesses the post master, sending him into a rage. The group reappears instantly because they knew the shadow would strike there only to find the person controlling the shadow. In his state, the post master complains about how the job is worthless and he gets no respect for it, but Tayori reminds him that every piece of mail has a recipient waiting for it which calms him down enough to catch him off guard. Despite their efforts, the person controlling the shadow escapes. Boruto and his classmates cheerily clean up the post office after the big fight. A couple of shadowy figures talk about how they need the negative chakra from people to awaken an entity called "Nue".
12	"Boruto and Mitsuki"; Transliteration: "Boruto to Mitsuki" (Japanese: ボルトとミツキ)	Mizumoto Hazuki	Masahiro Ōkubo	June 21, 2017	January 5, 2019
The class do a training exercise and Boruto's team is the only one in the class that cannot complete the exercise because Denki left behind and Boruto goes to help him. Shino announces that the whole class failed in the training because all of them abandoned their teammates in order to win. Denki tells Boruto that there are not any incidents happening lately, and Inojin says that they should stop searching for the culprit because the elders are already after him but Boruto still wants to find the culprit. Mitsuki realizes that everyone gravitate towards Boruto and Inojin explains that it is probably because Boruto does not want everyone to see him only as the son of Hokage, and tries to do things his own way. Mitsuki goes to visit Sumire at the hospital and asks her about her thoughts on Boruto. Sumire tells him that Boruto causes a lot of trouble at the academy but it is fun when he is around. She reveals that she is an orphan. Later, Mitsuki goes to Boruto's home and Hinata informs everyone that Naruto is also coming to dinner at home that night. Boruto takes Mitsuki to his room where he sees photos of Naruto and starts bragging about him and then asks Boruto if he likes Naruto or not but Hinata calls them for dinner before he can answer. Naruto arrives home to dinner and meets Mitsuki at the dining table, and Mitsuki tells Boruto that he resembles Naruto. As they are about to start eating, Naruto suddenly stops because his shadow clone gets a report from Shikamaru that a strong chakra is spreading across the village and he needs to go. Boruto gets mad at him and runs away from home with Mitsuki rushing after him. Mitsuki tells Boruto that he thinks Boruto likes Naruto but Boruto says that he hates the Hokage for abandoning his family because of his work. Mitsuki tells him that he knows the identity of the person who is behind all the incidents that happened until then.
13	"The Demon Beast Appears!"; Transliteration: "Majū, arawaru...!!" (Japanese: 魔獣、現る...!!)	Nobuyoshi Nagayama	Kō Shigenobu	June 28, 2017	January 12, 2019
Sai discovers the reality behind Danzo's fail safe and the culprit's name. Mitsuki and Boruto are having a conversation regarding if Sumire is the actual person to cause all the ghost incidents. Meanwhile, Sumire is found by Sai and his squad and is being captured with a sealing technique, but she lets Nue out and escapes in the chaos caused by him. Sai, Kakashi Hatake, and Naruto try to stop the summoned Nue using Mud Wall and sealing barrier techniques, but it does not help. Mitsuki gets the order to kill Sumire and he leaves to stop her. When he encounters Boruto, Mitsuki stops him with his clone and moves ahead. Sumire and Mitsuki have a brief fight, until they are interrupted by Boruto. A strange light then appears from Boruto's right eye, which teleports him and Sumire to an unknown dimension.
14	"The Path That Boruto Can See"; Transliteration: "Boruto ni mieru michi" (Japanese: ボルトに見える道)	Noriyuki Abe	Makoto Uezu	July 5, 2017	January 19, 2019
After Boruto defeats Nue, Mitsuki starts battling Sumire. However, Boruto forces the two of them to stop fighting, suffering a wound in the process while his statement of Sumire has been their friend at the academy convinces her to surrender. Afterwards, the three return to the Hidden Leaf where Sai takes Sumire promising the children she will not get hurt.
15	"A New Path"; Transliteration: "Atarashii michi" (Japanese: 新しい道)	Masatoyo Takada Masayuki Matsumoto	Masahiro Ōkubo	July 12, 2017	January 26, 2019
Boruto notices that the mysterious power in his eye is not activating for some weeks. Sai tells Naruto and Shikamaru that Sumire has confessed everything and the fact that she stops for her friends' sake. At the academy, Shino tells the students that they will forming three man teams with different classmates for a training exercise. Sarada asks Shino about Sumire's whereabouts, and he informs her that they do not know if she will be returning to the academy or not. Boruto and Mitsuki asks their friends to form a team with them but all of them have already formed a team except Metal. Shikadai reveals that the Leaf Police have taken over the case so they cannot do anything to bring Sumire back. Principal Iruka informs Shino that Sumire's report has come and she is under surveillance right now, but Shino decides to visit her. Boruto goes back home and is surprised to see Naruto at home. He asks Naruto to let Sumire free but Naruto says that even if he is the Hokage, he cannot just let her go after all that happened. But Naruto ensures him that he will not let him down. Shino visits Sumire and she tells him that she should take responsibility for what she had done, but Shino says that the Gozu Tennou is no longer inside her body so she can rethink about her decision. The next day, the training exercise starts and Shino runs from there after hearing some information about Sumire. After completing the training, Boruto asks about Shino and Sarada tells him that he rushed off after hearing some news about Sumire. Inojin also says that Sumire might be transferring to another school, but Shino returns with her. Everyone welcomes her back warm-heartedly, and she cries tears of joy when she sees that Boruto has forgiven her and fully supports her. A clone of Naruto goes to give Sasuke Uchiha a scroll of Gozu Tennou and asks him to return to the Hidden Leaf. But instead, Sasuke tells Naruto to apologize to Sakura Uchiha in his place. Toneri is shown on the moon mumbling about the Gozu Tennou. Momoshiki is shown ordering Kinshiki to do preparation for departure.
16	"Crisis: The Threat of Failing!"; Transliteration: "Daburi no kiki" (Japanese: 留年(ダブり)の危機)	Kawana Kana	Hideto Tanaka	July 19, 2017	February 2, 2019
Denki fails to walk on a wall at the academy, and all his friends tell him the concept of chakra in their own way but he does not understand anything and says that he does not want to repeat like Iwabe. Iwabe hears that but does not argue with him. Denki tries to walk on wall and Metal comes to help him in his training, and they start rock climbing but Denki falls and Lee comes just in time to save him. Lee is very happy to see him training very hard because he cannot use Ninjutsu and present him an outfit similar to his own outfit. Iwabe on the other hand having problem in his studies, sees Denki trying to walk on wall and goes to meet him and tells him to focus his mind to use chakra and Denki is able to walk on wall. On their way back to home from the Academy, Denki offers his help in Iwabe's studies but he rejects saying that he does not want any of his friends to repeat a year because of him but Denki says that he wants to pass with all of his friends including Iwabe and Iwabe accepts his help in studies. Denki suggests Iwabe to stand on roof using chakra while studying because he realizes that Iwabe concentrates better when he is using chakra, and Boruto brings burgers for all of his friends and their mouth burns after eating the burgers because they are so spicy. Later, when Denki and Iwabe are going to the Academy to take the test they see a building burning and Iwabe hears a woman saying that her kids are still in the building so he goes to save them leaving Denki alone. Boruto at the academy gets worried that they did not come because of his spicy burgers. Iwabe finds the children in the building but cannot find an exit, so he starts fixing the sprinklers. Denki after waiting so long decides to go after Iwabe and gets into the building. But when he reaches Iwabe he has already fixed the sprinklers. Iwabe asks him to carry a child out of the building. Iwabe gets mad at Denki after coming out of the building but was happy that everyone is safe. When they get to the Academy, Shino after getting the information about that incident tells them that they have already passed the test because they have used their skills in real life, and all of their friends including Cho-Cho congratulates them on passing the test.
17	"Run, Sarada!"; Transliteration: "Sarada, hashiru!!" (Japanese: サラダ、走る!!)	Masaaki Kumagai	Masaya Honda	July 26, 2017	February 9, 2019
The episode focuses on Sarada Uchiha who attempts to retrieve a teddy bear, as she promised her mother she would bring it to a little girl at the hospital in her care, all the while avoiding detection by Boruto and his friends. She is however unsuccessful. She is able to spot a similar doll but it is sent into the river as part of their ceremony. While retrieving it, she falls in the river and swims to the spot where Boruto and his friends are fishing. She is however able to deliver the doll and keep her promise.
18	"A Day in the Life of the Uzumaki Family"; Transliteration: "Uzumaki-ke no ichinichi" (Japanese: うずまき家の一日)	Nagayama Nobuyoshi	Kō Shigenobu	August 2, 2017	February 16, 2019
When Himawari falls sick Boruto remembers the day Naruto was officially made the Hokage, and the incidents which occurred that day where Himawari has awakened the Byakugan. Following in the present with Naruto taking him to Ichiraku ramen as they had made Hinata angry over Himawari's food since she was feeling well now. There, they meet Cho-Cho and Choji who had come for their monthly Ramen eating competition. Naruto then remembers all the incidents linked with Ichiraku over the period of his life. Boruto later learns of the Legendary Queen of Gluttony and that it was really his mother Hinata.
19	"Sarada Uchiha"; Transliteration: "Uchiha Sarada" (Japanese: うちはサラダ)	Takashi Andō	Masaya Honda	August 9, 2017	February 23, 2019
Boruto defaces the Hokage Mount in order to get Naruto's attention. In his attempt to get chased, he runs into Sarada, who covers for him. Boruto is quickly caught by Shikamaru, who remarks that Boruto and Naruto are very similar, being father and son, which Boruto resents (Shikamaru makes a similar comment about Shikadai and himself). Sarada wonders how Sasuke would be as a father since she was very young when he left the village and has not seen him much since. She asks Sakura if Sasuke needed glasses when he was a child, and Sakura's vague answer does little to satisfy Sarada. Sarada decides to look into the Uchiha clan, learning about the Sharingan and how she and her father are the clan's last living members; when she tries to do further research in regard to her father, she discovers that the information is restricted from public access. Sarada approaches her mother again and asks her if she even is Sasuke's wife. Out of anger, Sakura breaks the ground with a punch, but then she apologizes to Sarada for raising her voice and reassures her that Sasuke's feelings are connected with hers. Sakura subsequently faints upon seeing their house become demolished from the blow. In an effort to find their family portrait amid the ruins of the house, Sarada discovers that Sasuke's picture is that of a larger one featuring Karin, Suigetsu, and Jugo. Sarada notices that Karin wears glasses very similar to hers, which further fuels her doubt about her relationship to her mother. With Sakura in the hospital to recover from the stress, Sarada asks Shizune if she is in fact the daughter of Sasuke and Sakura. Shizune confirms this but becomes just as vague as Sakura when pressed by Sarada for more information. Sarada and Cho-Cho run into each other at a restaurant, with Cho-Cho revealing that she does not believe she is related to her parents and expressing her desire to travel in order to find her real ones. Sarada is inspired by the idea and resolves to track Sasuke down and make him tell her everything. In an unknown location, Sasuke emerges from a portal. He quickly finds himself attacked by an unknown assailant and activates his Sharingan.
20	"The Boy With The Sharingan"; Transliteration: "Sharingan no shōnen" (Japanese: 写輪眼の少年)	Hikari Satō	Kōjiro Nakamura	August 16, 2017	March 2, 2019
The mysterious person attacks Sasuke and gets defeated by him. Despite this, Sasuke is surprised to see that he has the Sharingan in possession. He then disappears from there. At the Hokage's office, Naruto receives a message from Sasuke and calls Kakashi to discuss the situation. Meanwhile, the person who attacked Sasuke meets someone, tells him about Sasuke's strength and they talk about their intentions of killing Sasuke. After talking with Kakashi, Naruto decides to meet up with Sasuke himself, and Sarada overhears him saying it, who had come there to ask Naruto about Sasuke's whereabouts. She decides to chase after Naruto to meet her father. Sarada gets prepared for the journey and waits for Naruto at the village's entrance. There, she meets Cho-Cho, who also plans to go on a journey to find her real father. Naruto departs and Sarada tries to chase after him but is left behind because Cho-Cho falls halfway. Boruto comes to deliver a lunch box to Naruto but arrives late, and Sarada asks him to let her deliver the lunch box in his place. He initially refuses but later agrees because she keeps asking him persistently. Afterwards, when Sarada and Cho-Cho are going after Naruto, the person who attacked Sasuke earlier gets in their way, introduces himself as Shin Uchiha and asks Sarada to come with him. She refuses to go with him and he attacks them, but Naruto comes to save them and fights him using his Tailed Beast form, much to everyone's surprise. Shin then retreats from there after acknowledging that he cannot win against Naruto. Sarada is worried after the incident, and Naruto assures her that he will protect her. Sarada delivers the lunch box, and Naruto decides to take them with himself for their safety. They eat their lunch, and after that Naruto tells them about how he sees Sasuke as his rival and how Sarada's appearance resembles Sasuke's, while her presence resembles Sakura's, such as her scary attitude when she gets mad. They continue their journey, and just when they are about to reach the tower where Naruto arranged to meet up with Sasuke, Cho-Cho gets tired and Naruto tells Sarada to rest for a few moments, but she makes an excuse and goes to meet Sasuke without Naruto and Cho-Cho. Her eyes transform into the Sharingan because of the strong emotions of happiness that she feels from finally getting to meet her father. When she enters the tower, Sasuke points his sword at her because, after seeing her Sharingan, he thinks that Sarada is with the person who attacked him.
21	"Sasuke and Sarada"; Transliteration: "Sasuke to Sarada" (Japanese: サスケとサラダ)	Yūsuke Onoda	Masaya Honda	August 23, 2017	March 9, 2019
Shizune informs Sakura that Sarada has left the village after seeing the picture with team Taka to meet Sasuke with Naruto. Sakura explains to Shizune that she is worried Sarada might end up getting involved in Sasuke's conflicts if she is close to him. At the tower, Sasuke pierces his sword into a pillar behind Sarada and tries to grab her, but when she calls him "Dad", he hesitates out of surprise and guilt for not recognizing his own daughter. Naruto shows up with Cho-Cho, and Sasuke angrily asks him why he brought kids along, but Sarada tells him that she purposefully followed Naruto to meet her father, as she wants to know whether Sakura is her real mother directly from him. Meanwhile, Shizune gets to know from Sakura that Sarada has awakened her Sharingan a long time ago. Sakura informs Shizune that she does not want Sarada to find out her father was an enemy of the Hidden Leaf in the past, this being the reason why she did not tell her about the others in the photo with team Taka. Sarada complains to Sasuke that he has never been around and that her mother never tells her anything. Sarada asks Sasuke about the woman in the picture (Karin) and his reason for abandoning his family for so long, but he replies simply that she has nothing to do with it. After hearing his answer, she cries out and leaves the tower, and Naruto asks Sasuke if it would not be better to let her know about the reason behind his absence. Both reminisce about the time when Sasuke left the Hidden Leaf in order to stay vigilant in case a threat similar to Kaguya came, as such a menace would bring global harm. Back then, Sasuke decided to keep his mission a secret, even at the cost of his daughter's possible future resentment. Naruto then leaves the tower and tries to comfort Sarada. Later, a mysterious person talks to Shin about his plan to revive Akatsuki and prepares to attack everyone at the tower along with several people who look like Shin. That person uses blades to attack Naruto, who foils the attack using Kurama's chakra. Then, Sasuke joins the fight and tries to defeat the enemy using Fire Style. The enemy uses Shin as a shield. He then introduces himself as Shin Uchiha and tells everyone present about his plan to revive Akatsuki using Sasuke's Sharingan. Sasuke asks Naruto to protect Sarada and decides to fight Shin alone. As Sasuke is about to attack him, Sasuke's sword suddenly pierces Naruto, as Shin explains that this is his Dōjutsu (Visual Prowess). Accordingly, Sasuke realizes that Shin marked his sword in their fight earlier. Because of Naruto's injury, Kurama's chakra fades, and Shin attacks Sarada with his blades, but Sasuke comes in their way to protect her, injuring himself in the process. Shin stops Sasuke's movements through the blades piercing Sasuke's body. Shin moves to take Sasuke's Sharingan, but Sakura suddenly appears and defeats the enemy with a single punch. Sarada stands surprised at former Team 7's resilience and power, realizing that even Naruto's injury has already started healing. Sakura hugs Sarada and apologizes to Sasuke for not making things more clear to their daughter, but Sasuke tells her that it is his fault. Naruto grabs both older and younger Shin and drags them toward himself. As they are about to get near Naruto, Shin's mysterious creature begins teleporting Shin and Sarada to his place, but Sakura pushes her daughter out of the way and is teleported instead of her. Sakura then ends up in Shin's hideout and finds herself surrounded by more of his sons.
22	"Connected Feelings"; Transliteration: "Tsunagaru omoi" (Japanese: つながる想い)	Rokō Ogiwara	Kōjiro Nakamura	August 30, 2017	March 16, 2019
In order to find Sakura, Sasuke and Naruto decide to go to Orochimaru's hideout to ask for information regarding Shin's location. Naruto tells Sarada that there is a chance she will meet the people in the picture there. Meanwhile, in his hideout, Shin explains to Sakura that human beings are bounded by their genes and are simple vessels. He also mentions how Akatsuki enables the stronger genes to thrive through battles and helps the formation of new Jutsu. On their way to Orochimaru's hideout, Naruto and Sasuke meet Captain Yamoto, who is on surveillance over Orchimaru. After getting into the hideout, they meet Sasuke's former teammates – Suigetsu and Jugo, who are the current caretakers of the hideout. Then, Orochimaru appears and meets them with a new, younger appearance. After hearing Shin's name from Sasuke, he takes them to another chamber and explains that Shin Uchiha is one of his old experiments that was used for the right arm of Danzo. Shin has a unique ability of being transplanted to or injected with anything without any side effects. He also explains why Shin refers to himself as Uchiha, the reason being that he can manifest the Sharingan and is obsessed with the Uchiha name, in particular with Sasuke's brother, Itachi. On their way out, Sarada asks Suigetsu if he knows the lady in the picture, and he identifies her as Karin. After hearing this, Sarada asks if she is in the hideout, to which Suigetsu replies that she is in another one. Then, Sarada reveals her doubts about her parentage, shocking Suigetsu and making him ask himself if her suspicions could ever be possible. In order to take a DNA test, Suigetsu takes a DNA sample from Sarada and uses what he thinks is Karin's umbilical cord. The result shows that there is a perfect match, making Suigetsu assume that Karin is Sarada's mom. Because of this, Sarada feels lied to and fooled by her mother. Realizing how Sarada feels, Suigetsu runs out of the room to prevent further problems. Naruto sees Sarada crying and comes to her. After Sarada manifests the Sharingan, Naruto shows Sarada her eyes in a mirror. He then tells her to calm down and tries to comfort her, but Sarada tells him that he has nothing to do with her and that he cannot understand how she feels. Naruto says he is the Hokage and the entire village is his family, which also includes Sarada. Naruto also tells her that the bonds between a parent and a child are not just based on history and blood relations but on the love between them, and he asks Sarada if she can remember any moments that show the love between her and Sakura. Sarada does this and thinks of several such instances, which depict how Sakura was taking care of Sarada when she was sick, how she reassured her about Sasuke's love for both of them and how she poked her forehead. After remembering all of these moments, Sarada becomes willing to go and save her mother from Shin Uchiha. After both of them leave the room, Suigetsu gets frightened and hides so that Sarada cannot see him. Orochimaru comments that Sakura might be dead already, to which Sasuke replies that his wife is not weak. Sasuke then says that his Visual Prowess is recovered and he will take everyone to the hideout in his Susanoo. Sarada and Cho-Cho are amazed by his abilities. In the hideout of Shin Uchiha, Shin plans to revive Akatsuki by killing Sasuke and taking his Sharingan, as he thinks Sasuke is not worthy of the Uchiha name.
23	"Bonds Come in All Shapes"; Transliteration: "Tsunagari no katachi" (Japanese: つながりのカタチ)	Ken'ichi Fujisawa Kaito Asakura	Kōjiro Nakamura	September 6, 2017	March 23, 2019
As Naruto and the others are coming to save Sakura, she starts fighting Shin after gaining enough information about his evil intentions of reviving Akatsuki. Meanwhile, Naruto and the others get confronted by Shin's clones upon their arrival at the hideout. Sarada rushes to save Sakura and Sasuke goes after her, while Naruto faces Shin's clones alone. Shin attacks Sakura with his blades and successfully pierces two blades into her arm, restricting Sakura's movement. Afterwards, Shin tries to kill Sakura with a giant shuriken, but Sasuke interrupts him and immediately helps Sakura, much to Sarada's enjoyment. He then goes after Shin, who lost his right leg, but a clone of Shin gets in his way. Instead, Shin stabs Sasuke along with his clone. After Sasuke and Sakura briefly look at each other, Sakura runs to the opposite direction of Shin, who sends his blades after her, but Sasuke changes places with Sakura using his Rinnegan and she finally defeats Shin with a single punch. After that, the clones fighting Naruto come near Shin, but instead of saving him, they stab him with their weapons. They tell him that they are just following Shin's principles, as his Visual Prowess is no longer powerful, and they believe that it is their turn to get to evolve. Then, several other clones made by the clones themselves come and start fighting Naruto and Sasuke. Shin tries to teleport himself along with Sakura between all the commotion, but Sarada stops him by punching his mysterious creature who has just begun teleporting them, thus showing that she inherited Sakura's natural control over chakra, much to Sasuke's pride and Sakura's surprise. The clone fighting Naruto stops after seeing Kurama inside Naruto, and Naruto promises that they will not attack them if they behave. Sakura hugs Sarada and Sasuke tells Sarada that her existence in the world is the proof of his and Sakura's connected feelings. Afterwards, all the clones are sent to the orphanage that is run by Kabuto, and upon returning to the village, Cho-Cho sees Choji in his slim form for the first time in her life and her quest to find her real father ends. At Orochimaru's hideout, Karin explains to Suigetsu that Sarada really is Sasuke and Sakura's biological daughter. She scolds Suigetsu for the mistake he made, as she was just the midwife for Sakura when Sakura went into labour, and tells him that the umbilical cord he used for the test is actually the one between Sakura and Sarada. She then urges him to go and apologize to Sarada. Sakura confirms to Sarada along with Sasuke that she is their biological child at the dining table. Next day, Sarada and Sakura see Sasuke off as he leaves for his mission. Before departing, Sasuke pokes Sarada's forehead and, remembering this gesture from her mother, Sarada turns to Sakura and smiles happily. At the academy, Sarada tells Boruto that she wants to become Hokage in the future.
24	"Boruto and Sarada"; Transliteration: "Boruto to Sarada" (Japanese: ボルトとサラダ)	Ayumu Ono	Masaya Honda	September 13, 2017	March 30, 2019
The Hidden Leaf hosts a summit between the Five Kage, during which Boruto tries to deface his father's statue once again. Sarada and Sakura place their newly taken family photo in their new home. After this, with her Sharingan now fully unlocked, Sarada trains with Cho-Cho to become Hokage, but she explains that, on her mother's advice, she plans to keep her new power a secret to avoid being targeted in the future. Konohamaru teaches Sarada more about the Sharingan and tells her she is now his rival toward becoming Hokage. During the summit, Naruto reveals that Sasuke has been using his Rinnegan to investigate the other dimensions and fears that one of them may be harboring dangerous threats. While the other Kage express concern that the new generation of ninja are not cut out for taking on threats should they be faced with a new war, Naruto reveals his belief that the new generation will manage to surpass them.
25	"The Turbulent Field Trip"; Transliteration: "Haran no shūgakuryokō!!" (Japanese: 波乱の修学旅行!!)	Matsuo Asami	Makoto Uezu	September 20, 2017	April 6, 2019
With last week's fear of war still hanging in the air, Naruto hopes to improve relations with the Land of Water by sending his village's students on a field trip to their Hidden Village. Principal Iruka concurs, and before they know it the students are on a cruise ship en route to the Hidden Mist. To the surprise of the students the Mist has been completely modernized, perhaps even more so than the Leaf, and seeing their amazement in the midst of a different village and culture is undoubtedly entertaining. In typical anime fashion, the girls are charmed by the foreign boys, while the boys are more interested in games and movies.
26	"The Mizukage's Successor"; Transliteration: "Mizukage no kōkeisha" (Japanese: 水影の後継者)	Takeru Ogiwara Tomoki Fujiwara Seimei Kidokoro	Kiyomune Miwa	September 27, 2017	April 14, 2019 (Note: Adult Swim moved Boruto: Naruto Next Generations from 11:30 p.m. to 2:00 a.m. EDT/PDT, making the air dates from episodes 26 to 52 effectively Sunday morning.)
Last week's instructive foray into the Hidden Mist extends into a class visit to the office of the new Mizukage, Chojuro. Boruto quickly tires of Chojuro's speech about unity between the villages, which the Kage mercifully cuts short. Kagura continues the Kage's story later, explaining that Chojuro is the reason for the Mist Village's recent prosperity. Kagura takes some time to reflect on the "Blood Mist's" dark past, which triggers a rather pertinent outburst from Iwabe. Iwabe tells a story about his grandfather being killed by the Fourth Mizukage, making a point that the Mist should not be so quick to write off their violent history when the war is still fresh in the minds of their victims.
27	"A Shinobi Bout of Friendship"; Transliteration: "Yūjō no shinobi bauto" (Japanese: 友情のシノビバウト)	Mizumoto Hazuki	Masahiro Ōkubo	October 4, 2017	April 21, 2019
With Kagura's help, Boruto and his friends manage to save Denki from the Hidden Mist Village's ninjas led by Hachiya. After this, Kagura confesses to the others that he is the grandson of the 4th Mikuzage, Yagura, and is afraid of wielding his sword because it once drove him to kill many of his classmates. Meanwhile, Shino, Anko and Mei discuss the issues between the Hidden Mist Village and the Land of the Water that could create another war. As the Hidden Leaf Village boys befriend Kagura, they wonder why did Hachiya take such methods. Happy with having obtained friends, Kagura informs the Mizukage Chojuro.
28	"Declaration of War"; Transliteration: "Sensen fukoku" (Japanese: 宣戦布告)	Yūsuke Onoda	Kō Shigenobu Makoto Uezu	October 11, 2017	April 28, 2019
Kagura decides to become one of the Seven Ninja Swordsman of Mist, so he starts practicing with the Hiramekarei sword. Boruto comes to meet him as he calls Boruto to show him the Hiramekarei sword. Boruto congratulates Kagura and assures him that he will become a good leader of the village. As Boruto is praising Kagura, someone suddenly captured them using Water Style. He then release them and Kagura calls him Shizuma. Shizuma tells them his plan to start another war by killing Boruto. Kagura tries to change his mind but instead he makes Kagura reminisce the time when he tried to kill a student at the academy, and Shizuma stopped him. He tells Kagura that the present Mizukage is hiring assassins to kill those who oppose him. After that, Boruto starts fighting Shizuma and when he tries his Lightning Style against him, his subordinates show up to help Shizuma in killing Boruto. Boruto gets pass through his subordinates using a new technique but Shizuma easily defeats him. Kagura saves him from drowning into the water, and Shizuma tells Boruto that he and the others are Seven Ninja Swordsman of Mist and Kagura is also one of them. He then orders Kagura to kill Boruto but instead he points out his sword at Shizuma. Kagura then agrees to join the Shizuma's group and asks to spare Boruto's life. Kagura leaves with the others and Boruto faints because of his injuries. When he wakes up, Sarada tells him that Hachiya told her about him. He apologizes to Boruto for his earlier actions. Suigetsu is shown in the Hidden Mist Village reveling Shizuma's full name Shizuma Hoshigaki. He then disappears as soon as Mitsuki shows up. Boruto asks Hachiya about the relation between Kagura and Shizuma, and he tells Boruto that Kagura feels indebted to Shizuma because he hurt him in the past. Sarada plans to tell the teachers about it, but Boruto stops her because he wants to save Kagura himself. Sarada agrees on the condition that he will let her go with him.
29	"The New Seven Ninja Swordsmen!"; Transliteration: "Shin shinobigatana shichininshū!!" (Japanese: 新・忍刀七人衆!!)	Kazuki Horiguchi	Kō Shigenobu	October 18, 2017	May 5, 2019
Boruto and Sarada convince Chojuro to help them take down Shizuma's gang and save Kagura, but they quickly find out that the "New Seven Swordsmen of the Mist" are not to be trifled with. Sarada is hit by an explosive attack that drops her through a deep hole into a cave, where she is confronted by Buntan Kurosuki, who wields the sword Kiba. Sarada's absence leaves Boruto and Chojuro as the only two remaining to take on Shizuma and the other five. Suigetsu confronts Mitsuki and warns him not to let his origins be revealed by saving Boruto. Shikadai and Inojin eavesdrop on Suigetsu and Mitsuki but are quickly discovered and recruited by Mitsuki to help take down Shizuma.
30	"The Sharingan vs. The Lightning Blade, Kiba the Fang!"; Transliteration: "Sharingan bāsasu raitō Kiba" (Japanese: 写輪眼VS(バーサス)雷刀·牙)	Naoki Hishikawa	Masaya Honda	October 25, 2017	May 12, 2019
As Buntan begins pressuring Sarada with her array of Lightning Release techniques augmented by the Kiba, Sarada manages to hold her own with her Sharingan. Buntan voices both her excitement and disdain at facing the Sharingan, seeing it as not only an unfair lineage trait but also a shortcut to power. Sarada retorts that Buntan stole the Kiba, but Buntan insists that she earned them and proved to be her father's child by more than just lineage. As the two continue to clash, with Sarada continuously copying her opponent's attacks, the Hideen Leaf's ninja realizes that their constant lightning attacks are heating the water around them and creating a mist. Sarada lures Buntan into the mist with genjutsu and uses the increased hydrogen to set off a large explosion with her paper bomb. Buntan is defeated, but Sarada collapses in exhaustion from excessive usage of her Sharingan. Meanwhile, Kagura fights Boruto and prepares to strike him down; Chojuro takes down three members of Shizuma's gang and is nearly ambushed before Iwabe arrives to take down the fourth, but the two get caught up in a large explosion. Elsewhere, Suigetsu gives Mitsuki a scroll, which he believes will help save Boruto.
31	"Boruto and Kagura"; Transliteration: "Boruto to Kagura" (Japanese: ボルトとかぐら)	Hikari Satō	Masahiro Ōkubo	November 1, 2017	May 19, 2019
Boruto tries to appeal to Kagura's common sense, but Shizuma's influence keeps Kagura on the attack. However, Mitsuki intervenes and reveals the scroll he received from Suigetsu: A signed confession from Shizuma's benefactors that they were using assassinations to start a new war. With his plan exposed, Shizuma attacks everyone with the Samehada. Boruto, Kagura and Mitsuki manage to beat Shizuma, but not before the Samehada fuses with Shizuma to turn him into a monster. Boruto and company overcome the transformed Shizuma and reunite with Sarada and Iwabe before returning to the hotel.
32	"The Quest for Souvenirs"; Transliteration: "Omiyage kuesuto" (Japanese: おみやげクエスト)	Yōji Satō	Masaya Honda	November 8, 2017	May 26, 2019
After forgetting to get Himawari a souvenir – breaking a promise he made to her, Boruto must find a way to regain her faith in him. He promises her to retrieve his Hidden Mist Village's Water Cinnamon Sweets he "misplaced". He proceeds to a shop recommended by Sarada and plays Shinobi Bout with the shop owner; an old lady. Boruto can see her cards via the reflection on a shiny jar behind the old lady and decides to tell her about it, forfeiting from the game. The old lady ultimately gives Boruto the Sweets (as a reward for his honesty) and he presents it to Himawari.
33	"The Super Beast Scroll Slump!"; Transliteration: "Suranpu!! Chōjū giga" (Japanese: スランプ!! 超獣偽画)	Tomoki Fujiwara Takeru Ogiwara	Hideto Tanaka	November 15, 2017	June 2, 2019
From Inojin Yamanaka's love of drawing since a young age, his signature technique, Super Beast Imitating Drawing, breathes life into pictures. However, one day he suddenly becomes unable to use that technique. The confused Inojin seeks out his father, Sai, who uses the same technique, but Sai does not give him any advice. For some reason, Sai then recommends Inojin to participate in a drawing competition aimed at children. Even though Inojin does well in the competition, Himawari is announced as winner by Sai. Inojin then gives up on the Super Beast Scroll, and decides to master his mom's Mind Transfer Jutsu and eventually succeeds; But, fails later. Inojin realizes that he was not able to use the technique, because he lost some thing important to begin with. He accepts Himawari as his master and tries to learn what he lacks in drawing. Finally Inojin realizes that he lost his love towards drawing which caused him to lose his signature technique and overcomes it with help of Boruto and Himawari.
34	"The Night of the Shooting Stars"; Transliteration: "Hoshi furu yoru" (Japanese: 星降る夜)	Seimei Kidokoro	Kiyomune Miwa Ukyō Kodachi	November 22, 2017	June 9, 2019
When Boruto realizes that graduating from the academy could mark the end of his friendships, he organizes a camping trip to solidify their bonds. Meanwhile, Sakura teaches a skeptical Sarada about how long friendships can last.
35	"The Parent Teacher Conference!"; Transliteration: "Sansha mendan...!!" (Japanese: 三者面談...!!)	Tomoki Fujiwara	Kō Shigenobu	November 29, 2017	June 16, 2019
Prior to the graduation exams, it is decided that the students will take part in a three-person interview to discuss their future plans. Boruto, who has passed his ninjutsu courses with flying colors, realizes his path toward becoming a "ninja" has been trouble-free and easy. As the students prepare for their finals, Boruto meets a journalist named Sukea (Kakashi in disguise again) who is doing a story on them. Something about Boruto's indifferent attitude about his future as a ninja raises a red flag in Sukea, and he gives Boruto a warning.
36	"The Graduation Exam Begins!"; Transliteration: "Sotsugyō shiken, kaishi!!" (Japanese: 卒業試験、開始!!)	Yūjirō Abe	Masahiro Ōkubo	December 6, 2017	June 23, 2019
After Boruto gets a perfect score in the ninjas' written exam, Kakashi takes interest in testing him. For the next test, the apprentices are tested by Shino, Anko, and Kakashi. Shikadai, Inojin and Cho-Cho face Anko, Sarada and Sumire face Konohamaru, Mitsuki faces Shino, and Boruto faces Kakashi. Although Kakashi remarks that Boruto has the potential to become a mid-level ninja (Chunin), he states he lacks something to graduate. After defeating Shino, Mitsuki goes to aid Boruto.
37	"A Shinobi's Resolve"; Transliteration: "Shinobi no kakugo" (Japanese: 忍の覚悟)	Yūsuke Onoda	Masahiro Ōkubo	December 13, 2017	June 30, 2019
Mitsuki and his friends save Boruto from Kakashi and retreat following their defeats. At night, the group think of a strategy to defeat their superiors while Boruto thinks about his will to become a ninja. In the morning, all the students manage to trap Kakashi within a barrier while Boruto tries to take the bell from him. Although they fail, Kakashi states they have already passed the test before, much to the children's surprise. As a result, Boruto and all of his friends become ninjas.
38	"Formation of the Three-Man Squad?"; Transliteration: "Surī manseru, kessei...?" (Japanese: スリーマンセル、結成...?)	Hiroyuki Okuno	Masaya Honda	December 20, 2017	July 7, 2019
The three-man squads are announced, with Boruto, Sarada and Mitsuki assigned to Team 3 under Konohamaru. Sarada immediately requests a transfer to a different squad, which Boruto also wants. Konohamaru tells them that the only way to change teams is to make a direct appeal to the Hokage. Elsewhere, Naruto is training the Hidden Leaf Jonin to resist his powers but is dismayed by their apparent weakness. While rushing to find the Hokage, Sarada inadvertently reveals her Sharingan to Boruto. After meeting up with Mitsuki who has Naruto's location pinned down, they are confronted at a bridge by Mirai, a Chunin and the granddaughter of the Third Hokage, who has been assigned to guard the bridge. Boruto and Sarada fall into a trap that causes the bridge ropes to snap, but Mitsuki uses his abilities to hold the bridge up – taking him out of the fight in the process. The other two struggle to overcome Mirai's advanced skills and incessant taunting at first but are told by Konohamaru to acknowledge each other's strengths and use teamwork. The pair manage to knock Mirai off the bridge and proceed on to meet with Naruto. Upon meeting him, rather than requesting a transfer, the three request that their squad be renamed "Team 7" in honor of the squad their parents were a part of – and hope to one day surpass. Back at the bridge, Mirai has been left tied up with no one to help her.
39	"The Path Lit by the Full Moon"; Transliteration: "Michita tsuki ga terasu michi" (Japanese: 満ちた月が照らす道)	Takeru Ogiwara	Hideto Tanaka	December 27, 2017	July 14, 2019
As Sarada and Mitsuki await Boruto, the former asks the latter what does his aspire to do. Mitsuki then remembers that time ago was in the care of Suigetsu as he suffered from amnesia but still had ninja skills. Mitsuki then meets Orochimaru who introduces himself as his parent and goes on a mission with him to recover his memories. Their enemy is instead revealed to be another "Mitsuki" who reveals that rather than children from Orochimaru, they are experiments. Wishing to form his own identity, Mitsuki abandons Orochimaru and goes to the Hidden Leaf Village, interested in Boruto. Back in the present, Mitsuki tells both Boruto and Sarada that he will always trust them.
40	"Team 7: The First Mission"; Transliteration: "Dainanahan, hatsu ninmu!!" (Japanese: 第七班・初任務!!)	Yoshito Hata	Touko Machida	January 10, 2018	July 21, 2019
Team 7 is sent on their first mission. Their first mission is to expel bandits from a small village called Green Banks. As Konohamaru assures Kiri, leader of the village, that his students are well trained for the mission, the villagers start attacking them in the night. As Sarada realizes they are trapped in an illusion, Boruto finds one of the enemies but is wounded in the clash. After Mitsuki knocks down the berserker villagers, Kiri is taken down by the enemy.
41	"Strength in Unity"; Transliteration: "Kessoku no chikara" (Japanese: 結束の力)	Kaito Asakura	Tōko Machida	January 17, 2018	July 28, 2019
Team 7 continue their work by going to save Kiri. The kidnapper who was after his deeds is killed by Rogue Ninjas. Konohamaru takes this chance to face them while his three students rescue Kiri and send her back to her village. However, although Konohamaru is able to defeat his enemy, another Rogue Ninja chases after the young children. As Kiri has been wounded in the previous clash, Boruto, Sarada and Mitsuki decide to work together to let Kiri rest while facing the enemy who is pursuing them. With Boruto and Mitsuki's help, Sarada manages to defeat the Rogue Ninja. After taking Kiri back to her village, Team 7 returns to Konohamaru with all its members satisfied with the results.
42	"A Ninja's Job"; Transliteration: "Ninja no oshigoto" (Japanese: 忍者のお仕事)	Kazuki Horiguchi	Kō Shigenobu	January 24, 2018	August 4, 2019
Annoyed with the boring missions they've been getting, Boruto requests a more difficult assignment. Konohamaru explains that missions like their first one are rare since they are living in a time of peace. Later that day, Team 7 is assigned to deal with a bank robber. Boruto is excited about the mission but it turns out to be a timid individual who has barricaded himself inside a bank and strapped a bomb to his chest. Boruto learns that the man is a former game programmer named Haguruma who was recently fired and he plans to activate the bomb against his former boss. Boruto manages to talk Haguruma out of it and later requests that Denki get him a job so that he can recover and redeem himself. Meanwhile, an unknown group is seen getting close to the Hidden Leaf Village.
43	"The Byakuya Gang Surfaces!"; Transliteration: "Byakuya-dan, arawaru!!" (Japanese: 白夜団、現る!!)	Nanako Shimazaki	Masaya Honda	January 31, 2018	August 11, 2019
A band of thieves known as the Byakuya Gang start stealing materials from banks from the Hidden Leaf Village. Sarada believes the Byakuyas might be talented in the mysterious ninjutsu technique Ice Release, so Boruto introduces her and Mitsuki to a scientist who creates ninjutsu with technology, Katasuke. Meanwhile, Shikadai becomes interested in playing shogi as part of a test from Shikamaru and in the process meets a child who plays it as well. On a following day, Team 7 tracks a Byakuya member outside the Hidden Leaf Village but Boruto loses interest in stopping him upon learning he is using the items to buy poor villagers get important resources.
44	"Shikadai's Doubts"; Transliteration: "Shikadai no mayoi" (Japanese: シカダイの迷い)	Masayuki Īmura	Masahiro Ōkubo	February 7, 2018	August 18, 2019
During another attack by the Byakuya gang, Metal is wounded. Although Boruto is still conflicted about the Byakuya Gang, he still feels that their methods are not good. As the Genin are not allowed to fight them, Boruto and his friends wonder about what they could do. One of the Byakuya Gang members, Ryogi, is revealed as the child who befriended Shikadai, and is sent to the Hidden Leaf Village but instead plays shogi with Shikadai again. Later, Shikadai's mother, Temari Nara, ambushes Ryogi and teams up with Boruto and her son to stop them. However, they fail.
45	"Memories from the Day of Snow"; Transliteration: "Yuki no hi no kioku" (Japanese: 雪の日の記憶)	Yūsuke Onoda	Kō Shigenobu	February 14, 2018	August 25, 2019
There is anticapitalist protest against companies in the Hidden Leaf Village created by Byakuyas. Despite his doubts, Ryogi decides he belongs with his group. He then remembers his parents' deaths years ago and how he attacked the assassin by awakening his Ice Release technique. Saved by Byakuya's leader, Gekko, who reveals they are independent ninjas, Ryogi joined them to fill his father's role. Nevertheless, back in the present, Ryogi once again reunites with Shikadai to play Shogi. Following the game, Shikadai proves Ryogi is from Byakuya. He then tries to make him leave Byakuya but Ryogi escapes claiming Shikadai has no potential to fight as a ninja.
46	"Go! The Crest of Night Strategy"; Transliteration: "Kekkō!! Kyokuya sakusen" (Japanese: 決行!! 極夜作戦)	Yūjirō Abe	Kōjiro Nakamura	February 21, 2018	September 1, 2019
The Kaminarimon company starts receiving multiple complaints as manipulated by Byakuya who plan the "Crest of Night Strategy". The ninjas then gather the young Genin, as Byakuya and civilians plan to attack the Kaminarimon. The Inojin, Shikadai and Cho-Cho Team prepare a plan to stop possible thieves, with Shikadai realizing the real target might the research laboratory. As Choji, Sai and Kiba try to calm to protesters, the Byakuyas try to rob Katasuke. Shikadai and Boruto decide to work together to face the Byakuyas. The two fail to save Katasuke from the enemy but the scientists managed to leave localizer on them for the two ninjas to use. Through Sarada's Sharingan, the ninjas learn the protesters are being controlled. The Byakuyas are then ambushed by Boruto and the Ino-Shika-Cho Team. Shiikamaru, Inojin and Cho-Cho face Gekko's underlings while Shikadai and Boruto search for the leader. Naruto manages to calm the protesters by showing them the Byakuya's real identities and their use of genjutsu. Gekko and Ryogi are then confronted by Shikadai and Boruto.
47	"The Figure I Want to Be"; Transliteration: "Naritai sugata" (Japanese: 成りたい駒(すがた))	Takeru Ogiwara	Masaya Honda	February 28, 2018	September 8, 2019
Ryogi faces Boruto and Shikadai, stating that despite becoming a thief, Gekko saved his life in the past. Ryogi initially tries to place Boruto into an illusion but Gekko judges Ryogi's loyalty by making him kill the Hidden Leaf Village ninjas. Boruto and Shikadai try facing both Ryogi and Gekko, but Gekko escapes before turning his follower into a berserker with his genjutsu. With Boruto's help, Shikadai calms Ryogi and make up. Although they believe Gekko managed to escape, Naruto reaches him and takes him down, recovering Katasuke's scroll. Ryogi accepts being imprisoned.
48	"The Genin Documentary"; Transliteration: "Genin dokyumentarī!!" (Japanese: 下忍ドキュメンタリー!!)	Naoki Horiuchi	Hideto Tanaka	March 7, 2018	September 15, 2019
As Naruto announces the examinations where low class "genin" ninja can become middle-ranked "chunin", Iwabe becomes dispirited with failing once again while interacting with Denki and Metal. Their team, Squad 5, are given a mission to appear in a film. Although they perform their techniques good to the director, their leader, Udon, cancels the mission. Iwabe becomes angered by this work and ends up fighting against his teammates. Udon calms them revealing he also used to suffer from this pressure. Later that night, Team 5 sees a building collapsing and saves the film makers taking a look there. As the director wishes to reprogram the series, Naruto congratulates Team 5 stating he never passed the exams despite being the Hokage.
49	"Wasabi and Namida"; Transliteration: "Wasabi de Namida" (Japanese: ワサビでなみだ)	Yūichirō Aoki Masayuki Matsumoto	Tōko Machida	March 14, 2018	September 22, 2019
Hanabi's squad, Team 15, gets a mission to capture multiple animals released by an unknown person. Hanabi gives Wasabi, Namida and Sumire permission to capture them alone based on the fact they are not dangerous. However, Sumire wonders she should say Wasabi and Namida the truth about the Ghost Case. While the mission proceeds smoothly, Wasabi gets bothered by Namida's actions causing her to abandon the work. Alone, Namida tries to catch the last animal, the miniature monkey, but is chased by a wolf. With help of Sumire and Wasabi, Namida is able to calm the wolf. Finishing the mission, Sumire confesses she was behind Nue's actions but the trio make up.
50	"The Chunin Exams: The Recommendation Meeting"; Transliteration: "Chūnin senbatsu shiken suisen kaigi" (Japanese: 中忍選抜試験推薦会議)	Noriyuki Abe	Masahiro Ōkubo	March 21, 2018	October 6, 2019
The episode started with the sudden appearance of Shikamaru in Hokage's office, as Naruto was busy with the feudal lord. Meanwhile, Shino, Konohamaru, Moegi and Udon think about their students' past activities and wonder whether they are suited to take the Chunin Exams. When Hanabi comes, she forces Shino to drink sake, freeing all the insects inside his body.
51	"Boruto's Birthday"; Transliteration: "Boruto no tanjōbi" (Japanese: ボルトの誕生日)	Norihiko Nagahama	Kō Shigenobu	March 28, 2018	October 13, 2019
Team 7, Hinata, Himawari and Sakura celebrate Boruto's birthday but he is saddened by his father's absence. Boruto visits Katasuke who animates the teenager by saying he recognizes his skills in contrast to other ninjas who believe he is lucky due to being the Hokage's son. Upon returning home, Himawari wonders whether Naruto will be on her upcoming birthday which causes her older brother to promise it. Team 7 is then given a mission involving attacks to thieves. Naruto then learns about the Otsutuski clan's apparent locations and decides to take part in one of them despite being meant to be a secret to the shinobi world. Before his departure, Boruto makes his father promise he will appear on Himawari's birthday. Team 7 learns that most of the thieves were killed by an unknown "white" creature. In the mines, they find the thieves' corpses and are ambushed by the creatures that Konohamaru identifies as the White Zetsu.
52	"Sasuke's Shadow"; Transliteration: "Sasuke no kage" (Japanese: サスケの影)	Kaito Asakura	Kō Shigenobu	April 4, 2018	October 20, 2019
After their opponents escape the brief scuffle, Konohamaru explains that the White Zetsu are creatures created by Kaguya Otsutuski, the originator of all ninjas who was defeated and sealed by Naruto and Sasuke fifteen years ago in the Fourth Great Ninja War with the White Zetsu assumed to have died out. Sarada convinces Konohamaru to keep fighting the White Zetsu as the Team 7 defeats a White Zetsu. The team later learn that Sasuke has been in the area and using his Amaterasu to incinerate the remaining White Zetsu. Konohamaru reveals to his students that Sasuke is on a secret mission to investigate the Otsutuski clan but has to keep it a secret to the ninja world. Shortly afterwards, Team 7 leave the area. In Kaguya's ice dimension, Sasuke is seen confronting two figures of the main Otsutuski Clan: Kinshiki and his master Momoshiki.

== Home media release ==
=== Japanese ===
Aniplex (Japan, Region 2)
DVD	Release date	Discs	Episodes	DVD-BOX	Release date	Discs	Episodes
1	July 26, 2017	1	1–4	1	November 1, 2017	4	1–15
2	August 23, 2017	1	5–8	1	November 1, 2017	4	1–15
3	September 27, 2017	1	9–12	1	November 1, 2017	4	1–15
4	October 25, 2017	1	13–15	1	November 1, 2017	4	1–15
5	December 6, 2017	1	16–20	2	March 7, 2018	4	16–32
6	January 10, 2018	1	21–24	2	March 7, 2018	4	16–32
7	February 7, 2018	1	25–28	2	March 7, 2018	4	16–32
8	March 7, 2018	1	29–32	2	March 7, 2018	4	16–32
9	April 4, 2018	1	33–35	3	August 8, 2018	5	33–50
10	May 9, 2018	1	36–39	3	August 8, 2018	5	33–50
11	June 6, 2018	1	40–43	3	August 8, 2018	5	33–50
12	July 4, 2018	1	44–47	3	August 8, 2018	5	33–50
13	August 8, 2018	1	48–50	3	August 8, 2018	5	33–50
14	September 5, 2018	1	51–54	4	January 9, 2019	5	51–70

=== English ===
Viz Media (North America, Region A / 1)
Set	Release date	Discs	Episodes	Ref.
1	April 9, 2019	2	1–13 + OVA	
2	July 16, 2019	2	14–26	
3	October 8, 2019	2	27–39	
4	January 21, 2020	2	40–52	

Madman Entertainment (Australia and New Zealand) Parts (Region B / 4)
Part	Release date		Discs	Episodes	Ref.
Part	Blu-ray	DVD	Discs	Episodes	Ref.
1	July 10, 2019	November 6, 2019	2	1–13	
2	November 6, 2019		2	14–26 + OVA	
3	January 22, 2020		2	27–39	
4	April 15, 2020		2	40–52	

Collections (Region B)
Collection	Release date	Discs	Episodes	Ref.
1	April 5, 2023	8	1–52 + OVA	

Manga Entertainment (United Kingdom, Region B)
Set	Release date	Discs	Episodes	Ref.
1	August 19, 2019	2	1–13	
2	December 9, 2019	2	14–26 + OVA	
3	June 1, 2020	2	27–39	
4	August 10, 2020	2	40–52	
