= Sky trooper =

Sky trooper or variation, may refer to:

- Paratrooper, a soldier who drops from the sky
- Smokejumper, a firefighter who drops from the sky
- Douglas C-53 Skytrooper, a troop transport airplane also used for airborne deployment
- Sky Trooper, a 1942 Disney cartoon WWII propaganda film starring Donald Duck
- Space marine, a fictional sky-based soldier

== See also ==
- Parachutist
- Spacetrooper
- Trooper (disambiguation)
- Sky (disambiguation)
- Starship Troopers (disambiguation)
- Paratrooper (disambiguation)
- Skydiver (disambiguation)
