= Space diver (disambiguation) =

Spacediver or space diver or similar, may refer to:

- A space diver, a person who participates in space diving
- Intamin Space Diver, a rollercoaster design
  - The Space Diver (coaster), a roller coaster at Six Flags Magic Mountain, Valencia, California, USA
- Space Diver (album), a 2020 album by Boris Brejcha

== See also ==
- Space (disambiguation)
- Diver (disambiguation)
- Skydiver (disambiguation)
