= Skydive (disambiguation) =

To skydive is to jump from an aircraft with a parachute, as a sport.

Skydive may also refer to:

- "Skydive" (song), 2013 single by Chuckie featuring Maiday
- "Skydiving", a 2017 song by Lights from Skin & Earth
- Skydive (Transformers), a fictional character from the Transformers series
- Skydive (G.I. Joe), a fictional character in the G.I. Joe universe
- Skydive!, a 1996 young-adults novel by Gary Paulsen
- Skydive! Go Ahead and Jump, a 1999 video game developed by The Groove Alliance and Gonzo Games and published by Electronic Arts

== See also ==
- Spacedive
- Skydiver (disambiguation)
- Diver (disambiguation)
- Sky (disambiguation)
