= Diver (surname) =

Diver is a surname. Notable people with the surname include:

- Alfred Diver (1823–1876), English cricketer
- Bridget Diver (died 1915), watch guard in the American Civil War
- Ciaran Diver (born 1990s), Irish Gaelic footballer
- Colin Diver (born 1943), president of Reed College in Portland, Oregon, United States
- Cyril Diver (1892 –1962), first Director-General of the Nature Conservancy
- Damian Diver (born 1970s), Irish Gaelic footballer
- Danny Diver (born 1956), former manager of East Stirlingshire Football Club
- Edwin Diver (1861–1924), English cricketer
- Joe Diver, Irish Gaelic footballer
- Maud Diver (1867–1945), bestselling author
- Stuart Diver (born 1970), ski instructor, sole survivor of the 1997 Thredbo landslide
- William Diver (1921–1995), founder of the Columbia School of Linguistics

== See also ==
- Edward Divers (1837–1912), British chemist
