= Kana-Boon =

Japanese rock band

- Origin: Sakai, Osaka, Japan
- Genres: Rock; pop rock; J-pop
- Years active: 2008–present
- Labels: Hip Land Music Corp. (management), Ki/oon Music (recording)
- Members: Maguro Taniguchi; Masami Endō; Takayuki Yokoi; Yuriko Seki
- Past members: Hayato Koga; Takahiro Koizumi; Hirose Kaede; Yuuma Meshida
- Website: sp.kanaboon.jp

KANA-BOON (stylized in all caps) is a Japanese rock band formed in 2008. They made their major debut with Ki/oon Music in 2013. Ever since, they've had four albums reach the top ten on the weekly Oricon Albums Chart, with Doppel being their best-charting album, reaching the third place on the chart. They have also had five singles reach the top ten on the weekly Oricon Singles Chart, with "Full Drive" (フルドライブ) being their best-charting single, reaching the sixth place on the chart. Three of their singles have been used in the Naruto franchise, with "Silhouette" being used as the 16th Naruto: Shippuden opening theme, and "Diver" as the theme song for Boruto: Naruto the Movie and "Baton Road" as the first season opening for Boruto: Naruto Next Generations. The B-side for "Diver", "Spiral", was the theme song for Naruto Shippuden: Ultimate Ninja Storm 4 video game.

This group also made a single for the anime The Perfect Insider titled "Talking". Their single "Fighter" was chosen to be the fourth opening of Mobile Suit Gundam: Iron-Blooded Orphans. Later, their song "Starmarker" was used as the second opening of the fourth season of My Hero Academia, "Torch of Liberty" as the second opening of the second season of Fire Force, and "Song of the Dead" as the first season opening of Zom 100: Bucket List of the Dead.

== History ==
=== 2006–2013: Origins and early history ===
The group was initially formed in 2006 as part of Osaka Prefectural Izumisougou Senior High School's light music club in Sakai, Osaka, and officially formed as a band in 2008. Maguro Taniguchi initially invited Takahiro Koizumi to join the club, and later invited Hayato Koga and Yuuma Meshida. The band's name derives from popular internet slang and their music was inspired by popular bands like Alice In Chains, Arctic Monkeys, and Beastie Boys. The band began performing live at the Mikunigaoka Fuzz live house in Osaka from 2010. During August to September 2011, bassist Hiroaki Hirose left the band, with Yuuma Meshida replacing Hirose. In December 2011, the band won the eo Music Try special prize award.

In April 2012, Kana-Boon won the Ki/oon 20 Years Audition out of 4000 contestants, and served as the opening act for Asian Kung-Fu Generation. On April 13, 2013, the band released their first music video, "Naimononedari", directed by Shinta Yamagishi, and announced their first nationally distributed work, Boku ga CD o dashitara (僕がCDを出したら), for release on April 24, 2013 through their management Hip Land Music. The album performed successfully, placing 14th on the Oricon Charts.

=== 2013–2024: Major label debut; hiatuses and departure of band members ===
On August 5, 2013, the band announced it had signed with onto the major label Ki/oon Music, and announced their first major label single, "Jousha Hissui No Kotowari, Okotowari" (盛者必衰の理、お断り), and their first major label album, Doppel. The first song for the album, "1.2. step to you", was used in commercials for Docomo's dHits service in April 2014. On February 26, 2014, the band released their second single "Kesshōsei" (結晶星), a re-recording of their 2011 independently-released song of the same name. On May 21, 2014, the band released their third single, "Full Drive" (フルドライブ), becoming the band's best performing single, placing 6th on the Oricon Charts. On August 27, 2014, the band released their fourth single "Ikiteyuku" (生きてゆく). On September 8, 2014, Weekly Shōnen Jump revealed that Kana-Boon's fifth single, "Silhouette" (シルエット), would be used as the sixteenth opening theme for the anime series Naruto: Shippuden, and was released on November 26, 2014. On December 11, 2014, the band announced that they would be releasing their second album, Time, on January 21, 2015.

On March 23, 2015, it was revealed that their sixth single, "Nandemonedari" (なんでもねだり), would be used in commercials for Shiseido's Anessa cosmetics, and would be released on May 13, 2015. On June 15, 2015, it was announced that the band's seventh single, "Diver" (ダイバー), would be used as the theme song for the anime film Boruto: Naruto the Movie, and on June 29, 2015, it was announced the B-side track, "Spiral" (スパイラル), would be used as the theme song for the video game Naruto Shippuden: Ultimate Ninja Storm 4. "Diver" was released on August 5, 2015. On September 3, 2015, it was announced that the band would be performing the opening theme song for the anime series The Perfect Insider titled "talking". "talking" was a rearrangement of the band's independently-released single "Kuchi o tozashite" (口をとざして) from 2013. The song was released as a split single with Scenarioart, who performed the ending theme song for the series, on November 11, 2015. In 2018, they released the first best album, containing most of B-side album "KBB vol.1" and a PV collection "KANA-BOON MOVIE 05 / KB CLIPS ~Sanagi kara Mozo Mozo-hen~" on March 14, as the first part of their fifth anniversary plan. They released the albums Origin in 2016, and Namida in 2017.

On 13 June 2019, bassist Meshida was reported missing with his bandmates being unable to contact him. The band's upcoming show on 15 June was subsequently cancelled. On 16 June, Meshida was found safe, however the band would be suspending all activities and enter a hiatus. On 12 November 2019, Meshida officially left the band due to his mental health concerns.

On 22 October 2020, Taniguchi stepped away from band activities citing health problems, effectively placing the band on hiatus. He returned to the band in April 2021.

Fifth studio album Honey & Darling was released in 2022.

In May 2023, it was revealed that the band would provide the opening to new anime Zom 100: Bucket List of the Dead. The opening, titled "Song of the Dead" was released a single on 20 September.

On December 11, 2023, the band announced that drummer Koizumi and guitarist Koga would leave the band due to private issues. Taniguchi will continue working with Endō as a two-piece band, however all remaining activities for the year (including a nationwide tour and a Nippon Budokan 2-day live scheduled for November 2024) were suspended.

=== 2024–Present: Reborn as a two-piece; a new era ===
On 19 April 2024, the band announced a return to live performances, with a one-man live titled "SUPER PHOENIX" in May in Osaka and Tokyo. Furthermore, they made appearances at music festivals including 04 Limited Sazabys' YON FES 2024 and FLOW THE FESTIVAL 2024 in June.

On 25 September 2024, the band released their first song since becoming a two-piece band with "Love & MasterPeace". They then embarked on a national tour called "SOARING 'THE PHOENIX' TOUR" over October and November.

On 10 July 2025, the band digitally pre-released their new single "SUPERNOVA", which is the 7th opening of the Dr. Stone anime. The music video features their support members at the time, Yuriko Seki and Takayuki Yokoi, for the first time.

On 24 September 2025, Kana-Boon released a digital single in collaboration with Non called "GwGw". It was their second collaboration together, after she had appeared in the music video for "Song of the Dead". Featuring vocals and guitar by Non, the song was made for the Pokémon Music Collective, and was produced and written by Kana-Boon who sampled various sounds from the franchise, in the song.

From around September–October 2025, Kana-Boon's fifth single "Silhouette" had a revival due to its use on social media platforms, particularly on TikTok where dancing to the song became popular. By November, the song had topped Japan's TikTok music chart for three consecutive weeks. The song also re-entered the Billboard charts and achieved nine consecutive weeks in the top 10 of Billboard's JAPAN Hot Animation charts, as well as entering the top 10 of the Global Japan Songs Excl. Japan chart,result in ranking 20th on Billboard Japan Hot 100 first half of 2026. Additionally, it topped the Oricon Weekly Streaming Soaring ranking in November, which ranks songs based on the rate of increase in their average number of plays per day.

On 23 December 2025, the band announced that they would officially return to four members from 1 January 2026, with support members Seki and Yokoi joining the band full-time.

Following the announcement, the band returned to perform on The First Take, with a version of "Silhouette" subtitled "New Go-Line ver." featuring the new lineup premiering on 24 December. This version included an extra verse and guest appearances from Kenji Mihara (from Frederic), Asahi & Mossa (from Necry Talkie), TAMAYA2060% (from Wienners), Anri Endo (from Grape Kiki), and Yuho Kitazawa (from the peggies).

The band will be embarked on a nationwide 47-prefecture tour titled "CRITICAL HIT PARADE" starting in February 2026 in Tokyo, and ending in July in Osaka.

== Band members ==
Current members

- Maguro Taniguchi — lead vocals, rhythm guitar (2008–present)
- Masami Endō — bass guitar, backing vocals (2022–present)
- Takayuki Yokoi — lead guitar, backing vocals (2026–present)
- Yuriko Seki — drums, backing vocals (2026–present)

Support members

- Takayuki Yokoi — lead guitar (2024–2025; became full-time in 2026)
- Yuriko Seki — drums (2024–2025; became full-time in 2026)
- Takahisa Yamashita — bass guitar, backing vocals (2019)
- Ryōtatsu Kamiyama — bass guitar (2019)
- KOZO — drums (2024)

Former members

- Hayato Koga — lead guitar, backing vocals (2008–2023)
- Takahiro Koizumi — drums (2008–2023)
- Hiroaki Hirose — bass guitar (2008–2011)
- Yuuma Meshida — bass guitar (2011–2019)

== Discography ==
=== Studio albums ===
Title	Album details	Peak positions
Title	Album details	JPN
Doppel	Released: October 30, 2013; Label: Ki/oon Music; Formats: CD, digital download	3
Time	Released: January 21, 2015; Label: Ki/oon Music; Formats: CD, digital download	4
Origin	Released: February 17, 2016; Label: Ki/oon Music; Formats: CD, digital download	6
Namida	Released: September 27, 2017; Label: Ki/oon Music; Formats: CD, digital download	7
Honey & Darling	Released: March 30, 2022; Label: Ki/oon Music; Formats: CD, digital download	29
Renai Shijō Shugi (恋愛至上主義 Love Supremacism)	Released: June 14, 2023; Label: Ki/oon Music; Formats: CD, digital download	34

=== Extended plays ===
Title	EP details	Peak positions
Title	EP details	JPN
Kanjō kibaku-zai (感情起爆剤 Emotion Initiator)	Released: November 21, 2011; Label: Self-released; Format: CD	—
Wakattenai no wa bokudatta (わかってないのは僕だった It was I who did not understand)	Released: May 27, 2012; Label: Self-released; Format: CD	—
Boku ga CD o dashitara (僕がCDを出したら When I release the CD)	Released: April 24, 2013; Label: Hipland Music; Formats: CD, digital download	14
Asuta (アスター Astor)	Released: May 30, 2018; Label: Ki/oon Music; Formats: CD, digital download	16
Nerine (ネリネ)	Released: December 19, 2018; Label: Ki/oon Music; Formats: CD, digital download	36

=== Best albums ===
Title	Album details	Peak positions
Title	Album details	JPN
KBB vol.1	Released: March 14, 2018; Label: Ki/oon Music; Formats: CD, digital download	27
KBB vol.2	Released: September 19, 2018; Label: Ki/oon Music; Formats: CD, digital download	36
Kana-Boon the Best	Released: March 4, 2020; Label: Ki/oon Music; Formats: CD, digital download	15

=== Singles ===
Title	Year	Peak positions		Notes	Album
Title	Year	JPN Oricon	JPN Billboard	Notes	Album
"Jousha Hissui No Kotowari, Okotowari" (盛者必衰の理、お断り)	2013	10	—		Doppel
"Kesshōsei" (結晶星)	2014	8	4		Time
"Full Drive" (フルドライブ)	2014	6	5		Time
"Ikiteyuku" (生きてゆく)	2014	19	13		Time
"Silhouette" (シルエット)	2014	11	9	16th OP for the anime Naruto Shippuden.	Time
"Nandemonedari" (なんでもねだり)	2015	8	4		Origin
"Diver" (ダイバー)	2015	11	8	Theme song for the anime film Boruto: Naruto the Movie. B-side track "Spiral" was the theme song for Naruto Shippuden: Ultimate Ninja Storm 4 video game.	Origin
"talking"/"Nana Hitsuji" (talking/ナナヒツジ)	2015	14	—	Split single with Scenarioart. OP for the anime The Perfect Insider	Origin
"Run and Run" (ランアンドラン)	2016	9	20		Origin
"Wake up"	2016	16	23		Namida
"Fighter"	2017	13	25	2nd OP for the anime Mobile Suit Gundam: Iron-Blooded Orphans Season 2.	Namida
"Baton Road" (バトンロード)	2017	18	—	1st OP for the anime Boruto: Naruto Next Generations.	Namida
"Haguruma" (ハグルマ)	2019	37	—	2nd OP for the anime Karakuri Circus.	Kana-Boon the Best
"Massara" (まっさら)	2019	25	68	OP for the anime Sarazanmai.	Kana-Boon the Best
"Starmarker" (スターマーカー Sutā Mākā)	2020	29	46	2nd OP for the anime My Hero Academia Season 4.	Honey & Darling
"Torch of Liberty"	2020	38	—	2nd OP for the anime Fire Force Season 2.	Honey & Darling
"Re:Pray"	2021	29	31		Honey & Darling
"Kirarirari" (きらりらり)	2022	69	—	11th OP for the anime Boruto: Naruto Next Generations.	Non-album singles
"Song of the Dead" (ソングオブザデッド)	2023	41	—	OP for the anime Zom 100: Bucket List of the Dead. Featured in Forza Horizon 6.	Non-album singles
"Supernova"	2025	—	—	7th OP for the anime Dr. Stone	Non-album singles

==== Promotional and digital singles ====
Title	Year	Notes	Album
"Silhouette -TV Size-" (シルエット-TV SIZE-)	2014	TV size version of "Silhouette"	Non-album singles
"Marble - From The First Take" (マーブル - From THE FIRST TAKE)	2020	Digital single from The First Take performance of "Marble"	Non-album singles
"Naimonodenari - Revenge The First Take (feat. Mossa)" (ないものねだり - Revenge THE FIRST TAKE (feat. もっさ))	2020	Digital single re-recording of The First Take performance of "Naimononedari", featuring Mossa from Necry Talkie	Non-album singles
"Hope"	2021		Honey & Darling
"Silhouette (Tokyo Machine Remix) - Sacra Beats Singles" (シルエット (TOKYO MACHINE Remix) - Sakura Chill Beats Singles)	2021		Non-album single
"Merry-Go-Round" (メリーゴーランド)	2022		Honey & Darling
"Silhouette (Live at Sony Music AnimeSongs Online 2022)" (シルエット (Live at Sony Music AnimeSongs ONLINE 2022))	2022		Non-album singles
"Starmarker (Live at Sony Music AnimeSongs Online 2022)" (スターマーカー (Live at Sony Music AnimeSongs ONLINE 2022))	2022		Non-album singles
"Silhouette - From The First Take (feat. Takahiro Yamada)" (シルエット - From THE FIRST TAKE (feat.山田貴洋))	2022	Digital single from The First Take performance of "Silhouette", featuring Takahiro Yamada from Asian Kung-Fu Generation	Non-album singles
"Starmarker - From The First Take (feat. Daisuke Kanazawa)" (スターマーカー - From THE FIRST TAKE (feat.金澤ダイスケ))	2022	Digital single from The First Take performance of "Starmarker", featuring Daisuke Kanazawa from Fujifabric	Non-album singles
"Kirarirari" (きらりらり)	2022	11th opening theme for Boruto: Naruto Next Generations	Non-album singles
"Fuka" (フカ)	2023	Collaboration song for mobile game Monster Strike	Non-album singles
"Gradation (feat. Yuho Kitazawa)" (ぐらでーしょん feat. 北澤ゆうほ)	2023	Opening theme for My Love Story with Yamada-kun at Lv999, featuring Yuho Kitazawa from The Peggies	Renai Shijō Shugi
"Sakura no Uta" (サクラノウタ)	2023	Third song with the same reading of the title, with the title written in a different way for each song (in Hiragana–さくらのうた, Kanji–桜の歌, and now Katakana)	Renai Shijō Shugi
"Song of the Dead" (ソングオブザデッド)	2023	Opening theme for Zom 100: Bucket List of the Dead. Featured in Forza Horizon 6.	Non-album singles
"Yūgure" (夕暮れ)	2023	Originally released in 2012 when the band was independent, now re-recorded	Non-album singles
"Love & MasterPeace" (ラブアンドマスターピース)	2024	First single released as a two-piece band	Non-album singles
"Hora Lala" (ほららら)	2024		
"Bakemono" (ばけもの)	2024		
"Hibi" (日々)	2024		
"Silhouette New Go-Line ver. - From The First Take" (シルエット New Go-Line ver. - From THE FIRST TAKE)	2026	Digital single from the 2025 The First Take performance of "Silhouette", features Kenji Mihara (from Frederic), Asahi & Mossa (from Necry Talkie), TAMAYA2060% (from Wienners), Anri Endo (from Grape Kiki), and Yuho Kitazawa (from the peggies). Also has additional verse.	
"Right Here, Right Now"	2026	Written during the 2026 47-prefecture "Critical Hit Parade" tour, and debuted at the tour final in Osaka. First song composed by all four members of the new line-up.	

==== Independent singles ====
Title	Year	Album
"New Band Stage"	Unknown	Non-album singles
"Ame to yakō ressha" (雨と夜行列車 Rain and Night Train)	2009	Non-album singles
"Locker Room"	2009	Non-album singles
"Masani u~ōu~ōu~ō" (まさにウォーウォーウォー Wow Wow War)	2010	Non-album singles
"Kesshōsei" (結晶星 Crystal Star)	2011	Non-album singles
"Me o tojite" (目をとじて Keep an Eye Out)	2012	Non-album singles
"Mimi o fusaide" (耳をふさいで Close Your Ears)	2012	Non-album singles
"Kuchi o tozashite" (口をとざして Hold Your Mouth)	2013	Non-album singles
"Te mo Ashi mo Denai" (手も足も出ない I Have No Hands or Legs)	2013	Non-album singles
"Bokura wa itsu made tatte mo sa" (僕らはいつまで経ってもさ We can Stay Forever)	2013	Non-album singles

=== Covers ===
Year	Song	Original artist	Released on	Notes
2017	"Kimi to Iu Hana" (君という花 A Flower Named You)	Asian Kung-Fu Generation	AKG Tribute	Released: March 29, 2017
2022	"Haruka Kanata" (遥か彼方 Far Away)	Asian Kung-Fu Generation	Kirarirari	Released: November 2, 2022
2025	"Sangenshoku" (三原色 Three Primary Colours)	PELICAN FANCLUB	SUPERNOVA	Released: July 30, 2025

=== Other contributions ===
Year	Song	Original artist	Album	Notes
2014	"Full Drive"	Kana-Boon	Asian Kung-Fu Generation presents NANO-MUGEN COMPILATION 2014	Released: June 25, 2014
2025	"GwGw"	Non	Digital single	Released: March 24, 2025 Written (music and lyrics) and produced by Kana-Boon; collaboration with Pokémon Music Collective
2026	"Chewing Gum feat. KANA-BOON"	THREEE	Digital single	Released: June 9, 2026 Written (music and lyrics) by THREEE, Maguro Taniguchi Arranged by THREEE, KANA-BOON

== Music videos ==
=== Official music videos ===
Year	Title	Director(s)
2013	"Naimononedari" (ないものねだり)	Shinta Yamagishi
2013	"Declaration of Necessity of Proponents, Refusal" (盛者必衰の理、お断り Jousha Hissui No Kotowari, Okotowari)	Shinta Yamagishi
2013	"1.2. step to you"	Shinta Yamagishi
2013	"U~ōrīhīrō" (ウォーリーヒーロー)	Tetsuya Iwaguchi
2014	"Crystal Star" (結晶星 Kesshō Hoshi)	Higuchiryou × Wonowataru
2014	"Full Drive" (フルドライブ Furu Doraibu)	Sumisu
2014	"To Live" (生きてゆく Ikite yuku)	Shinta Yamagishi
2014	"Silhouette" (シルエット Shiruetto)	Kamatani Sōjirō
2015	"Snow Globe" (スノーグローブ Sunōgurōbu)	Sudō Kanji
2015	"TIME"	Sudō Kanji
2015	"Anything" (なんでもねだり Nan demo nedari)	Tanabe Hidenobu
2015	"Diver" (ダイバー Daibā)	Kamatani Sōjirō
2015	"Talking"	Takuya Tada
2016	"Run and Run" (ランアンドラン Ran'andoran)	Bait
2016	"Anger in the Mind"	Takuya Tada
2016	"Wake up"	Shinta Yamagishi
2017	"Fighter"	Kei Ikeda
2017	"Tears" (涙 Namida)	Shinta Yamagishi
2017	"Still We are Hoping" (それでも僕らは願っているよ Soredemo bokura wa negatte iru yo)	Takuya Tada
2018	"Sakura Song" (さくらのうた Sakura no Uta)	
2018	"Wandering Days and Fanfare" (彷徨う日々とファンファーレ Samayou Hibi to Fanfāre)	Sumisu
2018	"From the window at night" (夜の窓辺から Yoru no Madobe Kara)	Takuya Tada
2019	"Cogwheel" (ハグルマ Haguruma)	Kensuke Kawamura
2019	"Brand New" (まっさら Massara)	Tetsu Watanabe
2020	"Starmarker" (スターマーカー Sutā Mākā)	Hidenobu Tanabe
2020	"Marble" (マーブル Māburu)	
2020	"Torch of Liberty"	Hiroki Nakamura
2021	"HOPE"	Okushita Kazuhiko / Takuya Tada
2021	"Re:Pray"	Chiharu Shimura
2022	"Merry-go-round" (メリーゴーランド Merīgōrando)	Shinta Yamagishi
2022	"Glittering" (きらりらり Kirarirari)	GROUPN
2023	"Gradation (feat. Yuho Kitazawa)" (ぐらでーしょん feat. 北澤ゆうほ)	Smith
2023	"Just that" (ただそれだけ Tadasoredake)	Takumi Gunji
2023	"Song of the Dead" (ソングオブザデッド Songu Obu Za Deddo)	malloon / Kei Murotani
2024	"Twilight" (夕暮れ Yūgure)	サマーエンドブルーリオ (Rio Nakamura)
2024	"Love & MasterPeace" (ラブアンドマスターピース Rabu Ando Masutāpīsu)	Smith
2024	"Hora Lala" (ほららら Horarara)	Kiyoshiro Ishida
2024	"Monster" (ばけもの Bakemono)	Kiyoshiro Ishida
2024	"Hibi" (日々 Hibi)	Santa Yamagishi
2025	"SUPERNOVA"	
2026	"Right Here, Right Now"	Rui Ito

== Awards and nominations ==
Year	Award	Category	Work/Nominee	Result
2011	Eo Music Try	Special Prize	Kana-Boon	Won
2014	6th CD Shop Awards	Best Newcomer	Boku ga CD o dashitara (僕がCDを出したら)	Won
2014	6th CD Shop Awards	Best Newcomer	Doppel	Won
2014	18th Space Shower Music Video Awards	Best Video	"Naimononedari"	Nominated
2014	MTV Video Music Awards Japan	Best New Artist Video	Jousha Hissui No Kotowari, Okotowari (盛者必衰の理、お断り)	Nominated
2015	19th Space Shower Music Video Awards	Best Video	"To Live"	Nominated
2016	20th Space Shower Music Awards	Best Rock Artist	Kana-Boon	Nominated
2018	22nd Space Shower Music Awards	Best Rock Artist	Kana-Boon	Nominated
2024	8th Crunchyroll Anime Awards	Best Opening Sequence	"Song of the Dead"	Nominated
2026	Music Awards Japan	Best Revival Hit Song	"Silhouette"	Nominated
