= Plongeur =

Plongeur, the French word for diver may refer to the following

- The French submarine Plongeur
- An employee charged with washing dishes
