= Sturmtruppen (disambiguation) =

Sturmtruppen is an Italian comic series.

Sturmtruppen, German for "Storm trooper", may also refer to:

- Sturmtruppen (film), a 1976 Italian film
- Sturmtruppen: The Videogame, a 1992 videogame

== See also ==
- Stormtrooper (disambiguation)
