= Oddloop =

EP by Frederic
- Released: 24 September 2014
- Genre: Rock; dance-rock; experimental rock
- Label: A-Sketch

Oddloop is an EP album by Japanese rock band Frederic. It was released on September 23, 2014 and was also their debut at a major record label, peaking at number 73 on the Japanese charts. It won the Kansai block local award at the 7th CD Shop Awards.

It features the song, "Oddloop", whose name is a mixture between the Japanese verb odoru (踊る), meaning "to dance", and the English words "odd loop". The music video references this loop in its strange repeating sequences. It is their most popular song, with over 193 million views on YouTube as of February 2026. The two women dancers in the music video are Yuho Uchida (内田佑朋), and Arisu Mukaide (向出アリス).
