= Diver (Kana-Boon song) =

2015 song by Kana-Boon

Single by Kana-Boon

from the album Origin
- Language: Japanese
- A-side: "Diver"
- B-side: "Spiral" "Machi-iro"
- Released: August 5, 2015
- Genre: Rock
- Length: 11:50
- Label: Ki/oon Music
- Songwriter: Maguro Taniguchi

Kana-Boon singles chronology
"Nandemonedari" (2015)	"Diver" (2015)	"talking/Nanahitsuji" (2015)

"Diver" (Japanese: ダイバー) is a single by Japanese rock band Kana-Boon. It was released as the band's seventh major-label single on August 5, 2015, through Ki/oon Music. "Diver" was used as the theme song for the anime film Boruto: Naruto the Movie, while its B-side "Spiral" was used as the theme song for the video game Naruto Shippuden: Ultimate Ninja Storm 4.

== Background ==
On June 15, 2015, it was revealed that Kana-Boon would be performing the theme song for the anime film Boruto: Naruto the Movie. Kana-Boon had previously performed "Silhouette" as the 16th opening theme of Naruto Shippuden in October 2014. The band was selected to perform the film's theme song by Naruto creator Masashi Kishimoto after being impressed with the band's performance of "Silhouette", and stated that Diver was "an amazing song that many people can feel for", and that he would cry listening to the song. Kana-Boon's vocalist Maguro Taniguchi stated that the song was about taking a new step forward, and was elated with performing the theme song, having been a fan of Naruto.

On June 29, 2015, it was revealed that the B-side track "Spiral" would be used as the theme song for the video game Naruto Shippuden: Ultimate Ninja Storm 4, another title within the Naruto franchise.

== Release and reception ==
The single was released on August 5, 2015, in two editions, a standard edition and a first pressing limited edition. The first pressing limited edition contains a bonus CD-sized badge of Kana-Boon's mascot.

The single reached number 11 on the Oricon charts.

== Track listing ==
All tracks are written by Maguro Taniguchi.

No.	Title	Length
1.	"Diver" (ダイバー)	4:33
2.	"Spiral" (スパイラル)	3:02
3.	"Machi-iro" (街色)	4:15
Total length:		11:50

== Charts ==
Chart (2015)	Peak positions
Japan Weekly Singles (Oricon)	11

== Release history ==
Region	Date	Label	Format	Catalog
Japan	August 5, 2015	Ki/oon Music	CD	KSCL-2615
Japan	August 5, 2015	Ki/oon Music	CD+Bonus	KSCL-2613/4
