= Baton Road =

2017 song by Kana-Boon

Single by Kana-Boon

from the album Namida
- Language: Japanese
- A-side: "Baton Road"
- B-side: "Anātman" "Wonder Song"
- Released: July 12, 2017
- Genre: Rock
- Length: 10:05
- Label: Ki/oon Music
- Songwriter: Maguro Taniguchi

Kana-Boon singles chronology
| "Fighter" (2017) | "Baton Road" (2017) | "Haguruma" (2019) |

Music video
- "Baton Road" on YouTube

"Baton Road" (Japanese: バトンロード), is a song by Japanese rock band Kana-Boon. It was released as the band's twelfth major-label single, released on July 12, 2017, through Ki/oon Music. "Baton Road" was used as the first opening theme song for the anime series Boruto: Naruto Next Generations.

== Background ==
On March 13, 2017, the 15th issue of the 2017 release of Weekly Shōnen Jump revealed that Kana-Boon would be performing the first opening theme for Boruto: Naruto Next Generations. Kana-Boon previously performed three theme songs for the Naruto franchise: "Silhouette" for Naruto Shippuden, "Diver" for Boruto: Naruto the Movie, and "Spiral" for Naruto Shippuden: Ultimate Ninja Storm 4.

On writing the song, Kana-Boon's singer and guitarist Maguro Taniguchi stated that the title was decided due to Boruto: Naruto Next Generations being the next generation for the Naruto franchise, with a baton being handed over from Naruto to Boruto.

== Release and reception ==
The single was released on July 12, 2017, with two releases, a standard edition, and a limited edition release. The limited edition contains a bonus DVD with a documentary about drummer Takahiro Koizumi and his experience with his first directorial work, "Shin Silhouette", a new music video for Silhouette, and the "Shin Silhouette" music video.

The song was later included in the Boruto: Naruto Next Generations compilation album Boruto The Best, released on December 18, 2019, by Aniplex.

The single reached number 18 on the Oricon charts.

== Music video ==
The music video for "Baton Road" was released on July 1, 2017. The video shows Kana-Boon performing on a road within a wheat field. The video also shows a young schoolboy being given a red baton, who then runs to his friends, and then passes on the baton to an older student. The older student receives the baton, and runs towards his love interest. The student then passes the baton onto an office lady. The office lady, after putting away her CV, receives the baton and starts running towards her job interview. The office lady then passes the baton onto a salaryman. The salaryman then runs towards a construction worker and performs a dogeza. At the end of the song, Maguro Taniguchi then receives the baton.

== Track listing ==
All tracks are written by Maguro Taniguchi.

Standard Edition
| No. | Title | Length |
|---|---|---|
| 1. | "Baton Road" (バトンロード) | 4:41 |
| 2. | "Anātman" (アナートマン) | 3:16 |
| 3. | "Wonder Song" (ワンダーソング) | 2:08 |
| Total length: | | 10:05 |

Limited Edition (DVD)
| No. | Title | Length |
|---|---|---|
| 1. | "ファン待望！小泉貴裕初監督作品「シン・シルエット」（小泉が監督になるまでのドキュメンタリー / 「シルエット」Music Video 小泉監督編）" |

== Charts ==
| Chart (2017) | Peak positions |
|---|---|
| Japan Weekly Singles (Oricon) | 18 |

== Release history ==
| Region | Date | Label | Format | Catalog |
|---|---|---|---|---|
| Japan | July 12, 2017 | Ki/oon Music | CD | KSCL-2916 |
| Japan | July 12, 2017 | Ki/oon Music | CD+DVD | KSCL-2914/5 |
