= Shock troop =

Shock troop might refer to:

- Shock troops, troops intended to lead an attack
- Shock Troopers, an arcade game
- Shock Troops (album), an album by punk rock band Cock Sparrer, released in 1982
- Shock Troop (film), a 1934 German film
- Shock Troops (film), a 1967 French film
- Shock (troupe), an English music/mime/dance/pop group

== See also ==
- Storm trooper (disambiguation)
