= Paratrooper (disambiguation) =

A paratrooper is a military parachutist, or generalized as airborne troops.

Paratrooper or variant, may also refer to:

- A military unit named "Paratrooper" or similar; see List of paratrooper forces
- Smokejumper, a firefighter who drops from the sky on parachutes
- Paratrooper (film), a 1953 war film
- Paratrooper (video game), a 1982 video game
- Paratrooper (ride), a type of fairgrounds amusement ride, also called umbrella or parachute ride
- Montague Bikes "Paratrooper" folding Tactical Mountain Bicycle

== See also ==
- Parachutist
- Paratroopers' Day
- Paratroopers' Day (Tajikistan)
- The Paratrooper's Prayer
- Paratrooper helmet
- Paratrooper boots
- Trooper (disambiguation)
- Para (disambiguation)
- Starship Troopers (disambiguation)
- Skydiver (disambiguation)
