= Stormtrooper =

Stormtrooper or storm trooper may refer to:

== Military ==
- Stormtroopers (Imperial Germany), specialist soldiers of the German Army in World War I
- Sturmabteilung (SA) or Storm Detachment, a paramilitary organization of the German Nazi Party
- 8th Infantry Division (Philippines) or Storm Trooper Division, a Philippine Army unit
- The term is sometimes applied to Canadian soldiers of the First World War

== Other uses ==
- Stormtrooper (Star Wars), a fictional soldier from the Star Wars universe
- Stormtroopers (Transformers), a fictional group from the Transformers series
- The Stormtrooper Magazine, an American Nazi Party magazine (1964–1968)
- Stormtroopers, fictional soldiers in the Imperial Guard of Warhammer 40,000
- Stormtroopers, Polish neo-Nazi organization

== See also ==
- Shock troop (disambiguation), commandos or special forces in general
- Stormtroopers of Death, a crossover thrash band
- Sturmtruppen (disambiguation)
- Starship Troopers (disambiguation)
