= Silhouette (Kana-Boon song) =

2014 song by Kana-Boon

Single by Kana-Boon

from the album Time
- Language: Japanese
- A-side: "Silhouette"
- B-side: "Wakarazuya" "Baka"
- Released: November 26, 2014
- Genre: Pop-punk
- Length: 4:01
- Label: Ki/oon Music
- Songwriter: Maguro Taniguchi

Kana-Boon singles chronology
| "Ikiteyuku" (2015) | "Silhouette" (2014) | "Nandemonedari" (2015) |

Music video
- "Silhouette" on YouTube

"Silhouette" (Japanese: シルエット, Hepburn: Shiruetto) is a song by Japanese rock band Kana-Boon. It was released as the band's fifth major-label single, released on November 26, 2014, through Ki/oon Music. The single placed 11th on the Oricon charts. "Silhouette" was used as the sixteenth opening theme song for the anime television series Naruto: Shippuden.

== Release and reception ==
On September 8, 2015, the 41st issue of the 2014 release of Weekly Shōnen Jump announced that Kana-Boon would be performing the sixteenth opening theme for Naruto Shippuden. The single was released on November 26, 2014, with a standard edition and a limited edition release. The limited edition release included a DVD containing the recordings of nine songs, a clear folder, and a 2015 calendar. The song was later performed live on The First Take with Takahiro Yamada from Asian Kung-Fu Generation in 2022, and once again in 2025 as "New Go-Line ver." with Kenji Mihara (from Frederic), Asahi & Mossa (from Necry Talkie), TAMAYA2060% (from Wienners), Anri Endo (from Grape Kiki), and Yuho Kitazawa (from the peggies).

The single reached number 11 on the Oricon charts, and reached 2 on the Japan Hot 100 and Japan Hot Animation charts. The single also achieved Platinum certification in August 2018 by the Recording Industry Association of Japan in August 2018, for 250,000 music downloads.

From around September–October 2025, "Silhouette" had a revival due to its use on social media platforms, particularly on TikTok where dancing to the song became popular. By November, the song had topped Japan's TikTok music chart for three consecutive weeks. The song also re-entered the Billboard charts and achieved nine consecutive weeks in the top 10 of Billboard's JAPAN Hot Animation charts, as well as entering the top 10 of the Global Japan Songs Excl. Japan chart. Additionally, it topped the Oricon Weekly Streaming Soaring ranking in November, which ranks songs based on the rate of increase in their average number of plays per day.

On 30 April 2026, the song was nominated for "Best Revival Hit Song" at the 2026 edition of Music Awards Japan.

== Music video ==
The music video for "Silhouette" is directed by Sōjirō Kamatani, and features actor Hiroki Nakajima. Nakajima is seen in the rain, with shots of the band playing in a room with various artworks occurring throughout the video, and another shot of lead singer Maguro Taniguchi wearing an Asian conical hat whilst performing in a room in front of calligraphy and beside ornaments. Nakajima begins to run whilst in the rain before tripping over. Nakajima later stands and runs whilst screaming, before stopping and spinning in a parking lot. He later falls over whilst spinning around, lying on the ground and facing the sky. Montages of Nakajima, Kana-Boon, and Taniguchi continue throughout the video. As of November 2024, the music video on YouTube has reached over 306 million views with 3.2 million likes.

== Track listing ==
All tracks are written by Maguro Taniguchi.

| No. | Title | Length |
|---|---|---|
| 1. | "Silhouette" (シルエット) | 4:01 |
| 2. | "Wakarazuya" (ワカラズヤ) | 3:46 |
| 3. | "Baka" (バカ) | 3:32 |
| Total length: | | 11:49 |

Limited Edition (DVD)
| No. | Title | Length |
|---|---|---|
| 1. | "1.2. step to you" |
| 2. | "MUSiC" |
| 3. | "Mimic" (ミミック) |
| 4. | "Mitakunaimono" (見たくないもの) |
| 5. | "Tokyo" (東京) |
| 6. | "Hamushi to Jihanki" (羽虫と自販機) |
| 7. | "Worry Hero" (ウォーリーヒーロー) |
| 8. | "Kesshōsei" (結晶星) |
| 9. | "Full Drive" (フルドライブ) |

== Charts ==
| Chart (2014–2015) | Peak positions |
|---|---|
| Japan Weekly Singles (Oricon) | 11 |
| Japan Hot 100 (Billboard) | 9 |
| Japan Hot Animation (Billboard) | 2 |

== Certifications ==
Certifications for "Silhouette"
| Region | Certification | Certified units/sales |
|---|---|---|
| Japan (RIAJ) Digital | Platinum | 250,000^{*} |
Streaming
| Japan (RIAJ) | 2× Platinum | 200,000,000^{†} |
^{*} Sales figures based on certification alone.^{†} Streaming-only figures based on certification alone.

== Release history ==
| Region | Date | Label | Format | Catalog |
|---|---|---|---|---|
| Japan | December 8, 2014 | Ki/oon Music | CD | KSCL-2520 |
| Japan | December 8, 2014 | Ki/oon Music | CD+DVD | KSCL-2517 |
