= Necry Talkie =

Japanese rock band

- Origin: Sakai, Osaka, Japan
- Genres: Rock; pop rock; power pop; J-pop; punk rock
- Years active: 2017–present
- Labels: PCI Music (2017–2019); Sony Music Entertainment Japan (2020–)
- Members: Mossa (vocals, guitar); Asahi (electric guitar); Fujita (bass guitar); Kazuma Takei (drums); Ikuka Nakamura (keyboard)
- Website: necrytalkie.jp

Necry Talkie (Japanese: ネクライトーキー, Hepburn: Nekurai Tōkī) (stylized in all caps when romanised) is a Japanese rock band currently signed to Sony Music Entertainment Japan. It was formed in 2017, when Ren Asahi invited three other members to form a gig. By 14 August of that year, they performed their first live at a club and released their first demo single, "Taifu! (タイフー!, Taifuu)". At the same time, they also signed to PCI records. They released their first full album, One, on 5 December 2018. Subsequently, on 24 July of the following year, they released their mini-album, Memories, and on 23 September, they switched labels to Sony Music, and released their second full album, Zoo!!, on 29 January 2020. Furthermore, they also collaborated with Kana-Boon on The First Take, in the latter's single, "Naimononedari". Following this, they released their third album Freak on 19 May 2021.

== Members ==
- Mossa
  - Mossa (もっさ, Mossa; born 19 September 1994) is the main vocalist and rhythm guitarist of Necry Talkie, and occasionally is the band's songwriter. She was formerly a member of the band Kuuchuu Scoppy and performed covers as an utaite on the website Niconico under the name "Higa". Additionally, she also creates artwork for CD jackets and merchandise.
- Asahi
  - Ren Asahi (朝日 廉, Asahi Ren; born 23 July 1990) is the lead guitarist and songwriter for the band. Asahi is also active as the vocalist and guitarist for the band Contemporary na Seikatsu and is also active as a Vocaloid producer under the name "Ishifuro". The band is also active under his real name. As with Mossa, he also works on the artwork for CD jackets and merchandise.
- Fujita
  - Aya Fujita (藤田 彩, Fujita Aya; born 2 August 1990) is a bassist for Necry Talkie. Like Asahi, she also works as a member of the band Contemporary na Seikatsu.
- Kazuma Takei
  - Kazuma Takei (カズマ・タケイ, Takei Kazuma; born 20 August 1989) is in the drummer for Necry Talkie. He is also active as a support member for the band Contemporary na Seikatsu. Kazuma is also a former member of a band called Wagamama College.
- Ikuka Nakamura
  - Ikuka Nakamura (中村郁香, Nakamura Ikuka; born 22 April 19??), also known as Ayaka Nakamura (ナカムラアヤカ, Nakamura Ayaka), is the keyboardist for Necry Talkie. She is also affectionately nicknamed "Mu-san". Ayaka participated from the first live show as support and accompanied the band on tours. She is also a former member of the band Gugaguga.

== Discography ==
Albums

- One (2018)
- Zoo!! (2020)
- Freak (2021)
- Torch (2024)

Mini-albums

- Memories (2019)
- Memories2 (2022)

Both Memories albums consist of songs Asahi previously released as a Vocaloid producer under the name "Ishifuro". The band refers to them as "self-cover albums".

EPs

- Odore! Lambada (2023)
- Mob nari no Kung Fu (2025)
- Kemuri to Blue (2026)

Their song "For whom CHAKAPOCO rings (誰が為にCHAKAPOCOは鳴る, Daregatame ni CHAKAPOCO wa naru)" was used as the opening song for the anime TV series Eagle Talon: Golden Spell in 2020. Their song "Fuzaketenaize (ふざけてないぜ, Fuzaketenaize)" was used as the opening song for the first season of the anime adaptation of Girlfriend, Girlfriend in 2021, with the song also released as a non-album single. Their song "Bloom" was used as the opening credits song for the first season of Scott Pilgrim Takes Off in 2023. Mossa also sung the female vocals for the song lit. 'Tough-Acting Girl' (つよがるガール, Tsuyogaru Girl) by BotchiBoromaru which served as the opening theme for the anime adaptation of Too Many Losing Heroines!.

In 2026 their anime song portfolio gained "Smoke and Blue" (煙とブルー, Kemuri to Buruu) which served as the ending song for Chainsmoker Cat. For episode 11 of Chainsmoker Cat, the band recorded a cover of the opening theme "Nanmonee" (なんもねえ; lit. 'Nothing at All') by Wasureranneyo, who in turn did a cover of "Smoke and Blue" for the ending of that episode. The band previously recorded a cover of Wasureranneyo's "Band Yarouze" (バンドやろうぜ, "Let's start a band"), which was released as part of the bonus EP for Wasureranneyo's album "Imamo Wasureranneyo" (いまも忘れらんねえよ。) featuring older Wasureranneyo songs covered by other artists.
