= Starship Troopers (disambiguation) =

Starship Troopers is a 1959 novel by Robert Heinlein.

Starship Troopers may also refer to:

== Works derived from the novel ==
=== Film and television ===
- Starship Troopers (OVA), a 1988 Japanese anime
- Starship Troopers (franchise), a media franchise based on the novel, including:
  - Starship Troopers (film), a 1997 live-action film directed by Paul Verhoeven loosely based on the book
  - Starship Troopers 2: Hero of the Federation, a 2004 live-action sequel
  - Starship Troopers 3: Marauder, a 2008 live-action sequel film
  - Starship Troopers: Invasion, a 2012 animated sequel film
  - Starship Troopers: Traitor of Mars, a 2017 animated sequel film
  - Roughnecks: Starship Troopers Chronicles, an animated TV show aired in 1999-2000 set in the same universe as the book

=== Games ===
- Starship Troopers (board wargame), 1976
- Starship Troopers (pinball), 1997
- Starship Troopers: Terran Ascendancy, a 2000 real-time tactics video game
- Starship Troopers: The Roleplaying Game, a 2005 pen-and-paper role-playing game
- Starship Troopers: The Miniatures Game, 2005
- Starship Troopers (video game), a 2005 first-person shooter
- Starship Troopers: Terran Command, a 2022 real-time strategy video game
- Starship Troopers: Extermination, a 2023 co-op first-person shooter video game

== Other uses ==
- "Starship Trooper", a song by Yes
- space marine, also called starship trooper

== See also ==
- Starship (disambiguation)
- Trooper (disambiguation)
- Sky trooper (disambiguation)
- Stormtrooper (disambiguation)
