= Scenarioart =

Japanese band

- Origin: Shiga Prefecture, Japan
- Genres: Electronic; Pop rock
- Years active: 2009–present
- Labels: ES FICTION MUSIC (2013), Kioon Music (2014–2018), es.faction (2018–present)
- Members: Hayashi Kōsuke; Hattori Kumiko; Yamashita Takahisa
- Website: www.scenarioart.jp

Scenarioart (シナリオアート, Shinarioāto) is a three-member pop-rock Japanese band founded in 2009 by guitarist Kōsuke Hayashi and bassist Takahisa Yamashita, with drummer Kumiko Hattori joining in 2011. The band released the single "White Raincoat Man" in April 2013, which reached 2nd place on the Oricon Weekly Indies Chart, whereafter the EP - DRAMATICS - was released in June the same year on the band's independent label ES FICTION MUSIC. The band was signed to the Kioon Music record label in 2014, where they remained until 2018, when they decided to produce independently on their own label es.faction. As of 2020, they have released 3 full-length albums, 5 EPs, and 6 singles.

Their songs have been used in multiple anime series, including the ending themes of Boruto: Naruto Next Generations, Subete ga F ni Naru, and The Tatami Galaxy, the first two of which were released as singles, respectively "Sayonara Moon Town" in 2017, and "Nana Hitsuji" in 2015 on the split single talking / ナナヒツジ (Nana Hitsuji) with Kana-Boon.

== Members ==
The current members of the band are:

- Kōsuke Hayashi (ハヤシコウスケ, Hayashi Kōsuke), guitar, vocals
- Kumiko Hattori (ハットリクミコ, Hattori Kumiko), drums, vocals
- Takahisa Yamashita (ヤマシタタカヒサ, Yamashita Takahisa), bass, chorus

== Discography ==
=== Albums ===
List of albums, with selected chart positions
Title	Album details	Peak positions
Title	Album details	JPN
Happy Umbrella	Released: June 3, 2015 (JPN); Label: Kioon Music; Formats: CD, digital download	25
Faction World	Released: March 8, 2017 (JPN); Label: Kioon Music; Formats: CD, digital download	67
EVER SICK	Released: April 15, 2020 (JPN); Label: es.faction (Self-released); Formats: CD, digital download	89
Blue Smell	Released: June 22, 2022 (JPN); Label: es.faction (Self-released); Formats: CD, digital download	89

=== Extended plays ===
List of extended plays, with selected chart positions
Title	Album details	Peak positions
Title	Album details	JPN
DRAMATICS -	Released: June 19, 2013 (JPN); Label: ES FICTION MUSIC; Formats: CD	110
night walking	Released: January 15, 2014 (JPN); Label: Kioon Music; Formats: CD, digital download	30
Tokyomelancholy -トウキョウメランコリー- (Tōkyō Merankorī)	Released: September 17, 2014 (JPN); Label: Kioon Music; Formats: CD, digital download	48
dumping swimmer	Released: March 9, 2016 (JPN); Label: Kioon Music; Formats: CD, digital download	60
nuts a tea	Released: August 29, 2020 (JPN); Label: es.faction (Self-released); Formats: Digital download	—
white smell	Released: June 22, 2022 (JPN); Label: es.faction (Self-released); Formats: CD, Digital download	
sensitive sketch	Released: June 19, 2024 (JPN); Label: es.faction (Self-released); Formats: CD, Digital download	—

=== Singles ===
List of singles, with selected chart positions
Title	Single details	Peak positions
Title	Single details	JPN
talking / ナナヒツジ (Nana Hitsuji)	Released: November 11, 2015 (JPN); Label: Kioon Music; Formats: CD, digital download	14
"Epoch Parade" (エポックパレード, Epokku Parēdo)	Released: July 6, 2016 (JPN); Label: Kioon Music; Formats: CD, digital download	73
"Sayonara Moon Town" (サヨナラムーンタウン, Sayonara Mūn Taun)	Released: September 6, 2017 (JPN); Label: Kioon Music; Formats: CD, digital download	79
"See You Neverland" (シーユーネバーランド, Shī Yū Nebārando)	Released: September 8, 2018 (JPN); Label: es.faction (Self-released); Formats: Digital download	—
"Adahada Alien" (アダハダエイリアン, Adahada Eirian)	Released: March 29, 2019 (JPN); Label: es.faction (Self-released); Formats: Digital download	—
"dried flower" (ドライフラワー, Dorai Furawā)	Released: November 9, 2019 (JPN); Label: es.faction (Self-released); Formats: CD, digital download	—
