= Skydiver (disambiguation) =

A skydiver is a person who engages in the sport of parachuting.

It may also refer to:

- Skydiver (ride), an amusement ride designed and manufactured by Chance Rides
- Skydiver (submarine), a futuristic submarine featured in the TV series UFO
- The Skydivers, a 1963 film by Coleman Francis
- Sky Diver, a 1978 arcade game, later ported to Atari 2600
- Sky Diving (video game), a 2008 video game for the PlayStation 3
- "Sky Diver", a 2008 song by Owl City from Maybe I'm Dreaming

== See also ==
- Parachutist
- Paratrooper
- Spacediver
- Skydive (disambiguation)
- Diver (disambiguation)
- Sky (disambiguation)
- Paratrooper (disambiguation)
