= Maud Diver =

English author

- A portrait of Maud Diver from the 1910s by Walter Stoneman
- Born: Katherine Helen Maud Marshall; 9 September 1867; Murree, British India
- Died: 14 October 1945 (aged 78)
- Citizenship: British
- Occupation: Writer
- Spouse: Thomas Diver
- Writing career
- Genre: Imperial Romance

Maud Diver (born Katherine Helen Maud Marshall; 9 September 1867 – 14 October 1945) was an English author in British India who wrote novels, short stories, biographies and journalistic pieces primarily on Indian topics and Englishmen in India.

== Personal life ==
Diver was born Katherine Helen Maud Marshall in Murree, now in Pakistan, where her father Charles Henry Tilson Marshall served as an officer in the British Indian Army. She grew up in India and Ceylon (now Sri Lanka), but received her education in England. She had a lifelong friendship with the sister of Rudyard Kipling, Trix Fleming. Diver married Thomas Diver (1860–1941), an officer in the Royal Warwickshire Regiment, c. 1896. They settled in England and had a son, Cyril (1892–1962).

== Writing ==
Maud Diver published her first novel, Captain Desmond, VC, in 1907. This and several subsequent books were successful and charted on the bestseller lists of the time. She specialised in the imperial romance genre which was popular at the time. However, unlike her contemporary, Kipling, Diver has been forgotten by later generations. There has been recent interest in her books as a source of information for studies on Anglo-Indian culture.

Her novels tried to instruct Englishmen on how they were to live in British India and included depictions of mixed marriages (for example in Lilamani and its sequels) between Indians and the English as a positive means of bringing East and West together. She countered Kipling's aphorism of "East is East and West is West, and never the twain shall meet" with,

East and West are not antagonistic, but complementary: heart and head, thought and action, woman and man. Between all these 'pairs of opposites' fusion is rare, difficult, yet eminently possible. Why not, then, between East and West?

At the same time, she also held the view that the British bloodline should not be diluted too much (as in the book, Desmond's Daughter).

== Bibliography ==
- Captain Desmond, V.C. (novel, 1907)
- The Great Amulet (novel, 1908)
- Candles in the Wind (1909)
- The Englishwoman in India (non-fiction, 1909)
- Lilamani. A Study in Possibilities (1911)
- Sunia: and other stories (1913)
- The Judgment of the Sword. The tale of the Kabul tragedy, and of the part played therein by Major Eldred Pottinger, the hero of Herat (1913)
- The Hero of Herat : A Frontier Biography in Romantic form (1915)
- Desmond’s Daughter (1916)
- Unconquered: a romance (1917)
- Strange Roads (1918)
- The Strong Hours (1919)
- Far to seek. A romance of England and India (1921)
- "The Awakening: A Study in Possibilities" (1922)
- Lonely Furrow (1923)
- Siege Perilous, and other stories (1924)
- Coombe St. Mary’s (1925)
- But Yesterday- (1927)
- Together (1928)
- A Wild Bird (1929)
- Ships of Youth: a study of marriage in modern India (1931)
- The Singer Passes: an Indian tapestry (1934)
- Kabul to Kandahar (1935)
- Honoria Lawrence : a fragment of Indian history (1936)
- The Dream Prevails (1938)
- Sylvia Lyndon. A novel of England (1940)
- Royal India. A descriptive and historical study of India’s fifteen principal states and their rulers (1942)
- The Unsung. A record of British services in India (1945)
