= Cyril Diver =

First Director-General of the Nature Conservancy

Captain Cyril Diver, C.B., C.B.E., (1892 – 17 February 1969), was a civil servant and amateur naturalist. He became the first Director-General of the Nature Conservancy.

== Life ==
Diver was born in 1892, the son of Lt Colonel C Diver and the author, Maud Diver. Educated at Dover College and Trinity College, Oxford, after serving in France during World War I, he became a clerk in the House of Commons.

In the 1930s he performed a systematic survey of the varied ecosystems of Studland, Dorset. A keen naturalist he was especially interested in molluscan ecology and genetics.

During the war he was a clerk to the select committee on national expenditure. In May 1940 the House of Commons appointed its "Miss K Midwinter" as the first woman to be a clerk. She was initially placed as an assistant to "Captain Diver", but she went on to have her own committee in the following year.

Between 2012 and 2015, the National Trust ran a citizen science project named after Cyril – the Cyril Diver Project that was designed to carry out a comprehensive ecological survey of the Studland peninsula in a similar manner to Diver's original study.
