= Frederic (band) =

Japanese rock band

- Also known as: フレデリック
- Origin: Kobe, Japan
- Genres: Rock
- Years active: 2009–present
- Label: A-Sketch (2014–present)
- Members: Kenji Mihara; Koji Mihara; Takeru Takahashi; Ryuji Akagashira
- Past members: kaz.
- Website: frederic-official.com

Frederic (フレデリック) is a Japanese rock band from Kobe formed in 2009. The band is signed to A-Sketch Music Label and has, as of 2015, released 4 EPs and multiple singles. In 2015, Frederic won the Kansai block local award at the 7th CD Shop Awards for their album oddloop. This album was released on September 24, 2014, and was also their debut at a major record label.

== Members ==
Frederic currently consists of:

- Kenji Mihara (三原健司, Mihara Kenji) – Vocals, guitar (b.1990)
- Koji Mihara (三原康司, Mihara Kōji) – Bass guitar, vocals (b.1990)
- Ryuji Akagashira (赤頭隆児, Akagashira Ryūji) – Guitar (b.1989)
- Takeru Takahashi (高橋武, Takahashi Takeru) - Drums (b.1989)

Kenji and Koji are twin brothers. Kenji and Ryuji graduated from same vocational school, ESP Osaka

Former members:

- kaz. – Drums

== Discography ==
=== Albums ===
List of albums, with selected chart positions
Title	Album details	Peak positions
Title	Album details	JPN
Frederhythm (フレデリズム, Furederizumu)	Released: 19 October 2016 (JPN); Label: A-Sketch; Formats: CD, digital download	7
Togenkyo	Released: 18 October 2017; Label: A-Sketch; Formats: CD, digital download	10
Hyohyo to Emotion (飄々とエモーション)	Released: 7 July 2018; Label: A-Sketch; Formats: CD, digital download	7
Frederhythm2 (フレデリズム2)	Released: 20 February 2019; Label: A-Sketch; Formats: CD, digital download	8
Frederhythm3 (フレデリズム3)	Released: 30 March 2022; Label: A-Sketch; Formats: CD, CD/DVD, digital download	16

=== Extended plays ===
List of extended plays, with selected chart positions
Title	Album details	Peak positions
Title	Album details	JPN
Shinda Sakana no Youna Me o Shita Sakana no Youna Ikikata wa Shinai (死んだサカナのような眼をしたサカナのような生き方はしない)	Released: 12 December 2011 (JPN); Label: Self-published^{*}; Formats: CD	—
Uchū ni Muchū (うちゅうにむちゅう)	Released: 12 March 2014 (JPN); Label: Mash A&R; Formats: CD, digital download	89
oddloop	Released: 24 September 2014 (JPN); Label: A-Sketch; Formats: CD, digital download	73
OWARASE NIGHT	Released: 6 May 2015 (JPN); Label: A-Sketch; Formats: CD, digital download	16
Ototune	Released: 25 November 2015 (JPN); Label: A-Sketch; Formats: CD, digital download	46
Vision	Released: 9 October 2019 (JPN); Label: A-Sketch; Formats: CD, digital download	13
Yuyukanei Kaiyuroku (優游涵泳回遊録)	Released: 22 February 2023 (JPN); Label: A-Sketch; Formats: CD, digital download	16
Citrus Curio City	Released: 20 November 2024 (JPN); Label: A-Sketch; Formats: CD, digital download	18
*Live venue limited sale

=== Singles ===
List of singles, with selected chart positions
Title	Single details	Peak positions
Title	Single details	JPN
"Hitsuji no Uta" (ヒツジのうた)	Released: Unknown; Label: Unknown; Formats: CD	—
"Shimauma/Metro" (シマウマ/メトロ)	Released: 19 September 2009 (JPN); Label: Self-published; Formats: Digital download	—
"Sukima ni Haireba Kowakunai" (スキマに入れば怖くない)	Released: 17 November 2010 (JPN); Label: E-Development Records; Formats: CD	—
"Mushakusha Shite Yatta" (むしゃくしゃしてやった)	Released: 6 April 2013 (JPN); Label: Self-published^{*}; Formats: CD	—
"Kōkai wa Shiteinai" (後悔はしていない)	Released: 6 July 2013 (JPN); Label: Self-published^{*}; Formats: CD	—
"SPAM Seikatsu/Puroresu Gokko no Hula Hoop" (SPAM生活/プロレスごっこのフラフープ)	Released: 14 August 2013 (JPN); Label: Unknown; Formats: LP	—
"Odoru Sweater" (踊るセーター)	Released: 23 February 2014 (JPN); Label: Self-published^{*}; Formats: CD	—
"oddloop e.p."	Released: 24 September 2014 (JPN); Label: HMV Record Shop; Formats: LP	—
"Only Wonder" (オンリーワンダ, Onrī Wanda)	Released: 15 May 2016 (JPN); Label: A-Sketch; Formats: CD, digital download	16
"Kanashii Ureshii" (かなしいうれしい)	Released: 16 August 2017; Label: A-Sketch; Formats: CD, digital download	14
*Live venue limited sale
