= Diver =

Diver or divers may refer to practitioners of:

- Diving (sport), the sport of performing acrobatics while jumping or falling into water
- Underwater diving, including:
  - scuba diving
  - freediving
  - surface-supplied diving
  - saturation diving

== People ==
- Diver (surname)
- Edward Divers (1837–1912), British chemist
- "Diver", nickname of Tom Derrick (1914–1945), Australian Second World War recipient of the Victoria Cross
- "divers", or "diverse", neutral gender in Germany in Austria

== Military ==
- V-1 flying bomb, code named "diver" by the British World War II armed forces
  - Operation Diver, the British countermeasures against the German V-1 flying bomb campaign
- AUM-N-4 Diver, a proposed U.S. Navy torpedo-carrying missile of the late 1940s.
- Diver (United States Navy)

== Arts and entertainment ==
- Diver (EP), a 2006 EP by A Wilhelm Scream
- "Diver" (Nico Touches the Walls song), a 2011 song by Nico Touches the Walls
- "Diver" (Kana-Boon song), a 2015 song by Kana-Boon
- Divers (album), a 2015 album by Joanna Newsom
- The Diver, a 2000 sculpture by John Kaufman
- The Diver (play), a play by Hideki Noda and Colin Teevan
- Helldivers A 2015 game developed by Arrowhead Game Studios.
- Helldivers 2 A 2024 sequel to Helldivers.

=== Films ===
- The Diver (1911 film), a 1911 short film directed by Sidney Olcott
- The Diver (2001 film), a 2000 short film directed by PV Lehtinen

== Other uses ==
- Diver (painting), a 1962 painting by Jasper Johns
- Loons, called divers in Great Britain and Ireland, a group of aquatic birds
- "The Diver", nickname for a NBR 224 Class locomotive
- Divers ("diverse"), an unrelated but similar sounding word, is a legal gender option for intersex people in Germany. See Legal recognition of non-binary gender and Legal recognition of intersex people.
