= Children (disambiguation) =

Children are humans between the stages of birth and puberty.

Children or The Children may also refer to:

== Films ==
- Children (advertisement), a 2008 American political advertisement
- Children, a 1976 short directed by Terence Davies
- The Children (1980 film), a low-budget horror film
- The Children (1984 film), a French film
- The Children (1990 film), a British-German drama film directed by Tony Palmer
- Children (2006 film), an Icelandic film
- The Children (2008 film), a British horror film
- Children (2011 film), a South Korean film
- The Children (2019 film), a 2019 American supernatural horror film

== Literature ==
- "The Children" (1943), a Nelson Algren story in The Neon Wilderness
- Children (Gorky) (1910), a play by Maxim Gorky
- Children (play) (1974), by A. R. Gurney
- The Children (book) (1999), a book by David Halberstam
- The Children (play) (2016), a play by Lucy Kirkwood
- The Children (1928), a novel by Edith Wharton
- "Children" (short story), an 1886 short story by Anton Chekhov

== Music ==
- Children (band), a Los Angeles–based psychedelic pop band
- Children (David Murray album) (1984)
- Children (The Mission album) (1988)
- Children (EP), an EP by Seventh Avenue
- "Children" (Joe South song) (1970)
- "Children" (Robert Miles song) (1995)
- "Children" (V V Brown song) (2011)
- "Children", a song on EMF's album Schubert Dip
- "Children", a song on American's album America
- "Children", a song on Justin Bieber's album Purpose
- "Children", a song on Linda Perhacs' album The Soul of All Natural Things
- "The Children", a song on Daniel Merriweather's album Love & War
- Children 18:3, a ska band

== Media ==
- Children's BBC
- Children's ITV

== Television shows and episodes ==
- The Children (TV series), a three-part serial produced for ITV in the United Kingdom
- "The Children" (Game of Thrones), the season 4 finale of the television series Game of Thrones
- "Children" (The Bear), a 2024 episode of The Bear TV series

== People ==
- John George Children, chemist

== See also ==
- Child (disambiguation)
- Boys (disambiguation)
- Girls (disambiguation)
- Mr. Children, a Japanese rock band
