= Childs =

Childs may refer to:

== People ==
- Childs (surname)
- Childs Frick (1883–1965), paleontologist and son of Henry Clay Frick

== Places in the United States ==
- Childs, Maryland, an unincorporated community
- Childs, Minnesota, a former town
- Childs, West Virginia, an unincorporated community

== Other uses ==
- USS Childs, a destroyer in service from 1920 to 1945
- USS Alonzo Child, a Union Navy Civil War steamer sometimes referred to as Childs
- Childs Restaurants
- Childs v Desormeaux, the leading Supreme Court of Canada on social host liability for drunkenness
- Childs Hall at Whiteknights Park, a campus of the University of Reading, England

== See also ==
- Child (disambiguation)
- Children (disambiguation)
- Child's (disambiguation)
