= Hillary Clinton presidential campaign =

Hillary Clinton has unsuccessfully run for president twice:

- Hillary Clinton 2008 presidential campaign
- Hillary Clinton 2016 presidential campaign
