= Child (disambiguation) =

A child is a young human between the stages of birth and puberty.

Child may also refer to:

== In computer science ==
- The child node of a tree
- The child process created by another process

== In medicine and healthcare ==
- CHILD syndrome (congenital hemidysplasia with ichthyosiform erythroderma and limb defects), a genetic syndrome
- Children's Healthcare is a Legal Duty (CHILD), an American lobby group that opposes religious exemption laws

== Music ==
- Child (band), a popular British pop act of the late 1970s
- Lupe Fiasco, "The Child" of the hip hop supergroup Child Rebel Soldier
- "Child" (Mark Owen song)
- "Child" (Mark song)
- "Child", by Arca from Arca
- "Child", by Freddie Aguilar, an English version of "Anak"
- "Child", by Lights from Little Machines
- "Child", by Nidji from Breakthru'

== Other uses ==
- Child (surname)
- Child archetype, a Jungian psychology archetype
- Child baronets, four titles, two in the Baronetage of England and two in the Baronetage of the United Kingdom
- Child (magazine), an American parenting magazine published from 1986 to 2007
- Child & Co., a formerly independent private bank now owned by The Royal Bank of Scotland
- Child (hieroglyph), an ancient Egyptian hieroglyph
- Childs Hill, Greater London, named after Richard le Child

== See also ==
- Adolescent (disambiguation)
- Boy (disambiguation)
- Girl (disambiguation)
- Chiiild, Canadian band
- The Child (disambiguation)
- Child Ballads, a collection of traditional folk tunes
- Children (disambiguation)
- Childs (disambiguation)
- Kids (disambiguation)
- Childe, a nobleman's son who had not yet attained knighthood
- L'Enfant (disambiguation) (French for "the child")
