= Cild =

Cild, literally meaning "child", is an Old English title borne by some Anglo-Saxon nobles and typically denotes a man of high rank. As a cognomen, it may refer to:

- Ælfric Cild (fl. AD 975-985), ealdorman of Mercia
- Eadric Cild, also known as Eadric the Wild, (fl. 1068-70), Anglo-Saxon magnate who led English resistance to the Norman Conquest
- Wulfnoth Cild (died c. 1014), South Saxon thegn and probable grandfather of King Harold Godwinson

== See also ==
- Child (disambiguation)
- Eadwulf Yvelcild, also known as Eadwulf Evil-child, (fl. 973), Earl of Bamburgh
