= The Child =

The Child may refer to:

== Films ==
- The Child (1940 film), a 1940 Danish film
- The Child (1977 film), an American horror film
- The Child (1994 film), also known as Relative Fear
- The Child (2000 film) (original title: Lekroo or Lekhru), a Marathi film directed by Shrabani Deodhar
- The Child (2005 film), or L'Enfant, 2005 Belgian film
- The Child (2012 film) (original title: Das Kind), a film based on a book by Sebastian Fitzek
- The Child (2026 film) (original title: El niño), a Spanish drama

== Television ==
- "The Child" (Star Trek: The Next Generation), a second-season episode of Star Trek: The Next Generation
- "Chapter 2: The Child", 2019 episode of Disney+ series The Mandalorian

== Other uses ==
- The Child (poem), a 1930 English poem by Rabindranath Tagore
- "The Child (Inside)", a 1995 song by Qkumba Zoo
- Grogu, a character from The Mandalorian originally known as "The Child"

== See also ==
- Child
