= Norman Hsu =

American fraudster

- 徐詠芫
- Born: October 1951 (age 75); Hong Kong
- Known for: Pyramid scheme promoter, long-time fugitive, major fundraiser for US Democratic Party

Norman Hsu
- Traditional Chinese: 徐詠芫
Transcriptions
Standard Mandarin
- Hanyu Pinyin: Xú Yǒngyuán
- Wade–Giles: Hsü^{2} Yung^{3}-yüan^{2}

Norman Yung Yuen Hsu (born October 1951) is a convicted pyramid investment promoter who associated himself with the apparel industry. His business activities were intertwined with his role as a major fundraiser for the Democratic Party, and he gained notoriety after suspicious patterns of bundled campaign contributions were reported in 2007. Subsequently he was discovered to have been a long-time fugitive in connection with a 1992 fraud conviction. After turning himself in to California authorities in 2007 he fled the state again and was quickly recaptured.

The U.S. Justice Department investigated whether Hsu illegally reimbursed political donations by associates and formally charged him with fraud. On 27 November 2007, a federal grand jury indicted Hsu on charges of violating federal campaign finance laws and defrauding investors "out of at least $20 million."

== Biography ==
=== Early life ===
Hsu was born and raised in Hong Kong, though his family was originally from Shanghai. At age 18, he immigrated to the United States and obtained a BS degree in computer science from the University of California, Berkeley in 1973. Hsu married in 1974 and received a California real estate license in 1976. In 1981, he completed an M.B.A. from the Wharton School. He and other Hong Kong partners formed the sportswear company Laveno in 1982, which went bankrupt in 1984. He then created other sportswear companies, including Wear This, Base, and Foreign Exchange. He engaged in other businesses as well, including clothing stores and restaurants. During this time, he became a naturalized American citizen.

=== Ponzi scheme conviction and flight ===
Hsu was able to gain the trust of investors by his dress, by his warm and personable manner, by his educational credentials, by being quoted in trade magazines, and by the long list of business under his name, but had a record of changing addresses and leaving disappointed investors behind. Starting in 1989, Hsu raised $1 million from investors to launch a latex glove business. Some of these partners invested their life savings or mortgaged their homes, and some sued Hsu when it appeared their money was lost. In 1990, Hsu, then living in Foster City, California, declared a bankruptcy, stating that he was practically destitute, with no job, no income, and few possessions other than an SUV and a ring. That same year, he was also divorced as well as allegedly kidnapped by San Francisco Triad society gang leader Raymond Kwok Chow. In 1991, California authorities brought fraud charges against him, describing his operation as a Ponzi scheme. Specifically, authorities claimed Hsu had not engaged in any legitimate business activity, but instead was using funds from later investors to pay returns to earlier ones. In February 1992 Hsu pleaded no contest to one count of grand theft and agreed to serve up to three years in prison and pay a $10,000 fine. Hsu subsequently failed to appear at the sentencing hearing and a warrant was issued for his arrest.

Hsu fled to Hong Kong and lived there from 1992 to 1996 while working in the garment industry. He started at least two companies there, both with vague charters. Aided by what others described as a magnetic personality, he prospered for a while, living in a luxury building. However the companies were dissolved in 1997 and 1998, and by 1998 Hong Kong courts had declared Hsu once again bankrupt. He would not emerge from this Hong Kong bankruptcy until 2006.

=== Entry into politics ===
Hsu then returned to the United States in the late 1990s, despite his fugitive status, and established several addresses in the San Francisco and Los Angeles areas. He became an investor in Silicon Valley, invested in real estate in the San Francisco Bay Area, and still had engagements in the garment industry. He later relocated to New York, where he seemed to become involved in the apparel business once again and lived in a luxury apartment in SoHo while flying chartered jets.

Starting in 2003, Hsu began contributing to, and collecting contributions for, the Democratic Party, although he did not join the party and was not registered to vote. He also donated to causes such as the Innocence Project and Clinton Global Initiative. He also became a trustee of The New School in New York, to whom he donated $100,000 and provided the money for a scholarship.

Democratic Party figures claimed they did not know much about him or his businesses, but appreciated his support; and he became known to them as someone who could quickly raise large amounts of money, and as someone who networked tirelessly and always found ways to be included in high-profile events. By 2007, Hsu's status within Hillary Clinton's 2008 presidential campaign had risen to the level where he was a "HillRaiser", someone who had "bundled" more than $100,000 for her campaign, and to where he co-hosted a $1 million fundraiser at wealthy Democratic Party supporter Ron Burkle's Beverly Hills estate, and in September, he was scheduled to co-host a major gala fundraising event featuring music legend Quincy Jones.

== Controversy regarding political donations ==
=== Relationship with Paw family ===
In August 2007, an investigation by The Wall Street Journal revealed potential campaign finance irregularities involving Hsu, in his role as a "bundler", and his long-time associates, the Paw family of Daly City, California. Specifically, members of the Paw family made donations of over $200,000 to Democratic candidates since 2005. These donations closely coordinated with those of Hsu in terms of timing, amounts and donees. In addition, the donations appeared to be much larger than would be expected given the Paw's modest income. According to records obtained for the investigation, the Paws own a gift shop and live in a 1,280-square-foot (119 m^{2}) house that they recently refinanced for $270,000. William Paw, the 64-year-old head of the household, is a mail carrier with the U.S. Postal Service and earns approximately $49,000 a year. Other records linked Hsu to the Paws, including a campaign finance filing in which Hsu lists the Paw's home as his residence.

In September 2007, it was reported that the U.S. Justice Department has launched a formal investigation into possible campaign finance violations by Hsu and his associates. One focal point for the investigation concerns whether any of the donations by the Paws were reimbursed by Hsu, which would constitute a felony. Through his attorney, Hsu has denied any wrongdoing.

=== Status as fugitive ===
One day after the release of The Wall Street Journal's investigation, it was reported that the warrant issued after Hsu's failure to appear for sentencing for his 1992 fraud conviction was still valid. On 31 August 2007, Hsu surrendered to authorities at the district court house in Redwood City, California. The California Attorney General's office had negotiated $1 million bail to be eventually applied to restitution, but the presiding judge set the amount at the $2 million. Hsu was jailed briefly that day until his attorney returned with the increased bail. The following week, Hsu failed to appear for a bail reduction hearing on 5 September at which he was expected to turn in his passport. A "no bail" warrant was immediately issued for his arrest and Hsu forfeited the $2 million. On 6 September, he was arrested by the FBI in Grand Junction, Colorado, after falling ill on the California Zephyr train headed for Chicago. It was subsequently revealed that Hsu mailed suicide notes to several acquaintances and organizations before boarding the train, and was discovered with prescription pills loose in his compartment.

It was unclear how Hsu could have remained at large for 15 years and engage in prominent political activity without being detected. It was also unclear how a convicted felon, having already fled prosecution once, was allowed out on bail without first having to surrender his passport. Prior to Hsu's second attempt to flee, James Brosnahan, Hsu's attorney in California, defended Hsu stating that Hsu's prominence showed that he did not behave like a fugitive and that Hsu was moving towards a resolution of the matter, including a plan of restitution for victims of Hsu's actions.

On 13 September 2007, a Colorado judge denied a prosecutor's request for bail to be set at $50 million and instead set bail for Hsu at $5 million. The prosecutor reported Hsu to have a checkbook listing a balance of $6 million at the time of his capture in Grand Junction. The presiding judge remarked, "$2 million wasn't enough to keep Mr. Hsu from running. We'll see if $5 million will do it."

On 4 January 2008, Hsu was sentenced to jail for 3 years by California Superior Court Judge Stephen Hall for the original fraud conviction, now 16 years old. Judge Hall rejected Hsu's argument that his right to a speedy trial was denied by authorities who could have easily found and arrested him.

=== Source of income ===
The source of Hsu's income once he returned to the United States is unclear. While he claims to be involved in several businesses in the fashion industry, visits to those addresses "found no trace of Mr. Hsu." At several business addresses provided on Hsu's campaign donation forms, none of the listed businesses could be located. A New Jersey fashion designer that Hsu had listed as a co-investor, said he had never heard of Hsu. Lawrence Barcella, Hsu's Washington, D.C. attorney, claims that Hsu's post-1996-return Silicon Valley investments account for some of his ability to make his political contributions. However, detailed financial records for Components Ltd, a Hsu-controlled entity with no obvious business purpose, reveal payments of $100,000 to nine political donors whose contributions were later bundled by Hsu.

Upon learning about Hsu's proposed investment scheme, Irvine, California, businessman Jack Cassidy became concerned and warned the California Democratic Party that Hsu's activities may not have been legitimate. Apparently, Hsu was soliciting investors for a "bridge loan" operation that returned approximately 6% every 3 months. However, investors were told few details about the operation and investigators are trying to determine whether the "bridge loans" involved bona fide business activity or were simply a front for a new Ponzi scheme.

Hsu may in fact have been running multiple cons on a massive scale. As an example, a New York investment fund run by Woodstock Festival founder Joel Rosenman invested $40 million spread over 37 separate deals with a Hsu company. Hsu reportedly told Rosenman the money would be used to manufacture apparel for well known luxury brands, yielding a 40% profit on each deal. When Rosenman's fund recently attempted to cash checks from Hsu's company in September 2007, there were insufficient funds. Federal charges of fraud have since been brought against Hsu.

== Legal actions against Hsu ==
Since his re-incarceration, a variety of legal actions have been brought against Hsu.

=== Federal charges ===
On 19 September 2007, a federal complaint was issued against Hsu by the U.S. Attorney in Manhattan. The complaint alleges that Hsu's investment offerings were a Ponzi scheme that paid early investors with money that was contributed by later investors, that Hsu pressured investors to contribute to candidates for office, providing them with a list of candidates to choose from and that Hsu reimbursed some contributors to candidates for office in the amount of their contributions. Based on these actions, Hsu is charged with mail fraud, wire fraud and violating the Federal Election Campaign Act. He could face a sentence of up to 45 years in prison.

The Complaint cites to statements from three "victims" and two "witnesses" as well as a confession by Hsu to an FBI agent.

On 27 November 2007, a federal grand jury sitting in Manhattan indicted Hsu on charges of violating federal campaign finance laws and defrauding investors out of at least $20 million. According to the indictment, Hsu made "false promises" to private investors in his companies that they would be paid "guaranteed high rates of return on investments in the short term."

On 7 May 2009, Hsu pleaded guilty in federal court in New York to ten counts of mail and wire fraud in connection with the Ponzi scheme. Hsu stated that "I knew what I was doing was illegal" and faced up to 20 years in prison on each count. Hsu was still contesting the charges of campaign finance fraud, however.

Hsu was sentenced to 24 years in prison and is currently incarcerated in Federal Medical Center in Lexington, KY. His scheduled date of release is 12 August 2030.

=== Source Financing ===
"Source Financing Investors LLC," an investment fund started by Joel Rosenman (a Woodstock founder), claims that Hsu owes it $40 million. Source Financing sued Hsu on 20 September 2007. It has asked that all candidates who received campaign contributions from Hsu not donate them to charity as the money may have been improperly channeled from investors.

=== Briar Wood Investors ===
On 21 September 2007 a group of Southern California investors ("Briar Wood Investors") sued Hsu, claiming that he defrauded them, and that he pressured them into making contributions to the campaigns of elected officials.

It is not clear whether the recipients of Hsu's campaign contributions will be added as defendants to any of the lawsuits as the various funds seek solvent entities from which to recover their initial investments.

== Democratic party reaction ==
After initial reports of suspicious contributions, prominent Democrats defended Hsu's reputation. Supporters began to distance themselves after his long-time fugitive status was revealed. After Hsu fled the California justice system again in 2007, his contributions were renounced by an increasing number of elected officials.

The general pattern of reaction has been typified by Bob Kerrey, president of the New School and former Senator from Nebraska, who originally stated that Hsu had been "a terrific member" of the New School board. After Hsu resigned as a board member, Kerrey said the university did not do background checks of prospective trustees and that he hoped that Hsu "didn't break the law." After Hsu became a two-time fugitive, Kerrey remarked, "I thought that I knew him, but obviously I didn't."

One of Hsu's most tenacious supporters was Pennsylvania Governor Ed Rendell, who called Hsu "one of the best 10 people I've met." Later, Rendell said, "Though Norman is my friend and remains so, his failure to appear casts a new light on his assertions regarding the original [fraud] case. As a result I will follow other elected officials and donate the money he contributed to me to charity."

In comparison, 2008 Presidential candidate Hillary Clinton began to disengage from Hsu at an earlier phase of the scandal when Hsu's long time fugitive status was first revealed. After indications of additional misconduct by Hsu, the Clinton campaign then decided to refund a total of $850,000 in bundled contributions. Clinton was the first major candidate to give up bundled contributions from associates of Norman Hsu. However, it is also true that her campaign ignored earlier private warnings about Hsu and that Clinton was the largest recipient of bundled donations from Hsu.

In 2006, former President Clinton referred to Hsu as "our friend Norman". After the scandal went public, Bill Clinton remarked in colloquial language, "You could have knocked me over with a straw". Democrats are continuing to try to reconcile positive personal impressions of Hsu with his criminal behavior. Mark Gorenberg, who sat on President Barack Obama campaign's national finance committee, remarked, "Despite it all, I still love the guy, despite everything you read, every experience I ever had with him was nothing but delightful, and I just scratch my head."

Hsu never appeared to want or expect anything in return for his many contributions, other than to appear in high-profile circles; indeed a West Coast Democratic fundraiser said, "He seemed so desperate to be included in every big-ticket event in California … It was a little sad." One Clinton campaign aide attempted to penetrate more deeply into Hsu's motives, remarking that Hsu's business activity "was reinforced by his efforts in politics and philanthropy; he seemed like a generous guy, but only later did you realize what he was up to."
