= L'Enfant =

L'Enfant may refer to:

- L'Enfant (film), a 2005 Belgian film
- L'Enfant (poster), a noted 1987 photographic poster
- Pierre Charles L'Enfant, architect and civil engineer credited with planning the city of Washington, D.C.
- SS Pierre L'Enfant, a 1943 cargo ship
- L'Enfant Plaza, a complex of office buildings, a hotel, and an underground shopping mall in Washington, D.C.
  - L'Enfant Plaza Station, a transit station serving the plaza
- "L'Enfant", a song by Vangelis from the 1979 album Opéra sauvage
- "L'Enfant", a poem by Victor Hugo from the 1829 collection Les Orientales
