= Hillary Clinton 2008 presidential campaign =

Political campaign for United States presidency

Hillary Clinton for President 2008
- Campaign: 2008 Democratic primaries
- Candidate: Hillary Rodham Clinton; U.S. Senator from New York (2001–2009); First Lady of the United States (1993–2001)
- Affiliation: Democratic Party
- Status: Announced: January 20, 2007; Suspended: June 7, 2008
- Headquarters: Arlington, Virginia
- Key people: Maggie Williams (Manager); Terry McAuliffe (Chairman); Howard Wolfson (Communications Director)
- Receipts: US$252M (end of 2008)
- Slogan(s): Solutions for America! Ready for change, ready to lead Big Challenges, Real Solutions: Time to Pick a President; In to Win; Working for Change, Working for You; The strength and experience to make change happen.
- Chant: Yes We Will

Website
- www.HillaryClinton.com (archived – Feb. 28, 2008)

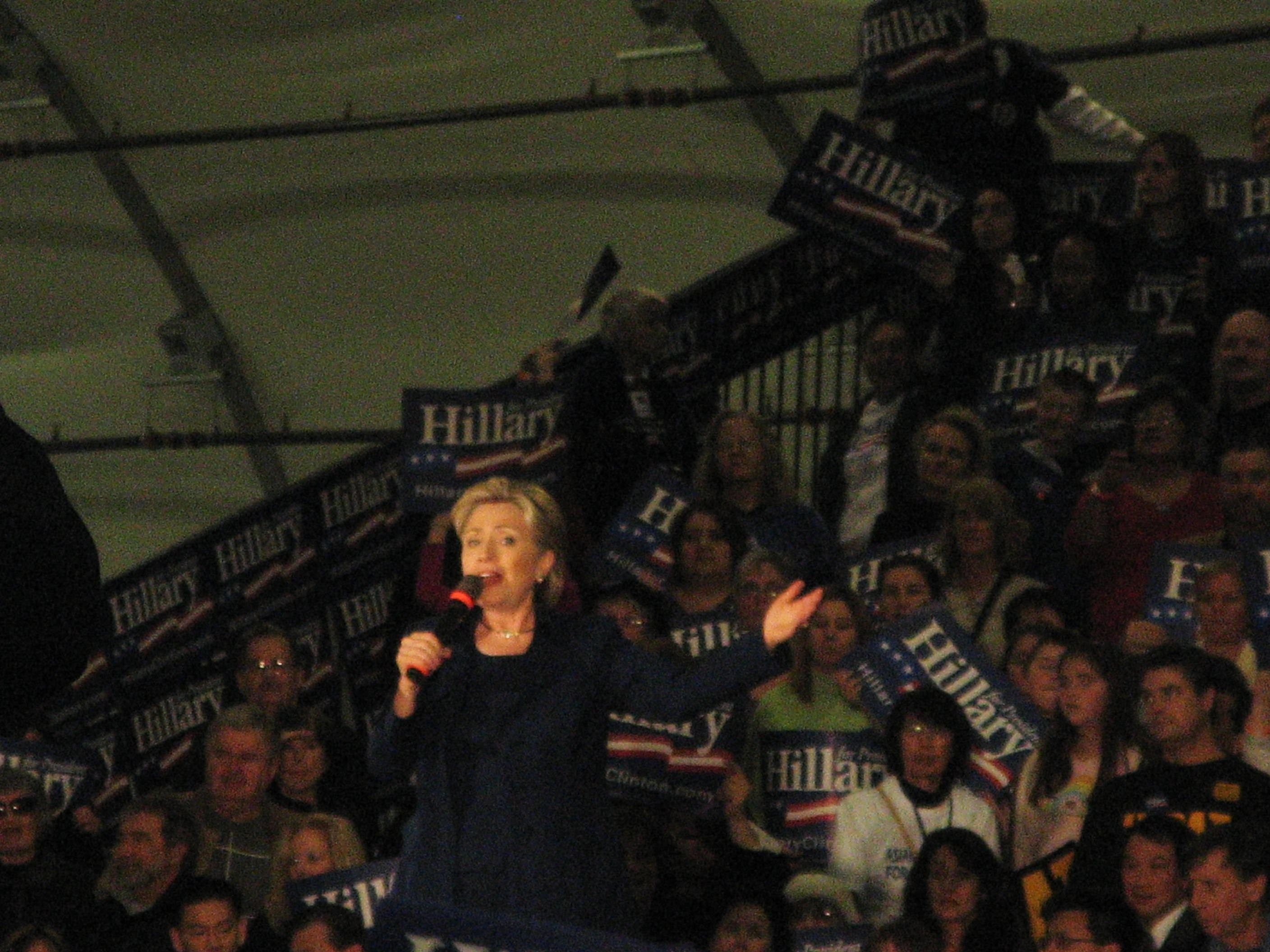
Hillary Clinton campaigning for the Democratic nomination for President of the United States. South Hall, San Jose, California, February 1, 2008.

Hillary Clinton, then junior United States senator from New York, announced her campaign for the 2008 Democratic Party presidential primaries on her website on January 20, 2007. Clinton was previously the first lady of the United States and first lady of Arkansas prior to her election as U.S. Senator from New York. She is also the wife of former President Bill Clinton. Clinton was the source of much media speculation since having expressed interest in being a candidate in the 2008 presidential election since at least October 2002.

Following her announcement of an exploratory committee and candidacy filing on January 20, 2007, with the FEC, she began fundraising and campaigning activities. For several months Clinton led opinion polls among Democratic candidates by substantial margins until Senator Barack Obama pulled close to or even with her. Clinton then regained her polling lead, winning many polls by double digits; by autumn 2007 she was leading all other Democratic candidates by wide margins in national polls. She placed third in the Iowa caucus behind Barack Obama and John Edwards, and trailed considerably in polls shortly thereafter in New Hampshire before staging a comeback and finishing first in the primary there. She went on to win a plurality of votes in Nevada, but won fewer delegates in Nevada than Obama, then lost by a large margin in South Carolina. On Super Tuesday, Clinton won the most populous states, including California and New York, while Obama won more states total. The two earned a nearly equal number of delegates and a nearly equal share of the total popular vote. Clinton then lost the next 12 caucuses and primaries to Obama, and lost the overall delegate lead to him for the first time. After an increasingly aggressive round of campaigning, Clinton broke the string of losses with wins in the Rhode Island, and Ohio primaries.

Clinton subsequently lost in Wyoming, Mississippi, Montana, North Carolina and Oregon, and won in Pennsylvania, Indiana, West Virginia, Kentucky, Puerto Rico, and South Dakota. On the final day of primaries on June 3, 2008, Obama had gained enough pledged- and super-delegates to become the presumptive nominee; she then suspended her campaign on June 7, 2008, and endorsed Barack Obama.

While losing the delegate count, and thus the nomination, she earned more popular votes than Barack Obama (though unlike Clinton's name, Obama's name wasn't on the ballot in the 2008 Michigan Democratic presidential primary; had all of the "Uncommitted" votes in the Michigan primary been counted as votes for Obama, Obama would have very narrowly won the popular vote as well). In the general election, Barack Obama defeated Senator and Republican nominee John McCain of Arizona, and nominated Clinton as the 67th Secretary of State, an office in which she served until February 2013.

In the 2016 presidential election, Clinton would go on to become the Democratic presidential nominee, but was defeated by Republican nominee Donald Trump, who endorsed her in the 2008 primaries.

== Pre-announcement events ==
In July 2005, the magazine Washington Monthly ran two side-by-side articles debating the pros and cons of a potential Clinton candidacy.

== Announcement of candidacy ==
Clinton announced formation of her exploratory committee on January 20, 2007, with a post on her website. In a statement on her website, she left no doubt that she had decided to run: "I'm in. And I'm in to win." She filed the official paperwork for an exploratory committee.

== Staff and policy team ==
=== Initial team ===
Clinton's campaign was run by a team of advisers and political operatives. Patti Solis Doyle was the first female Hispanic to manage a presidential campaign, which she did from its inception. Deputy campaign manager Mike Henry had managed Tim Kaine's successful campaign for Governor of Virginia in 2005 and coordinated the Democratic advertising efforts for the Senate elections of 2006. Mark Penn, CEO of PR firm Burson-Marsteller and president of polling company Penn, Schoen & Berland was described as Clinton's "strategic genius" in a role likened to that which Karl Rove played in George W. Bush's campaigns. Howard Wolfson, a veteran of New York politics, served as the campaign spokesperson. Evelyn S. Lieberman, who worked for Clinton when she was First Lady and served as Deputy White House Chief of Staff, was the chief operating officer of the campaign. Ann Lewis, White House communications director from 1997 to 2000, was Senior Advisor to the campaign. Cheryl Mills was general counsel for the campaign. Jonathan Mantz was finance director, Mandy Grunwald the lead media consultant, Neera Tanden the campaign's policy director, Kim Molstre the director of scheduling and long-term planning, Phil Singer the deputy communications director, Leecia Eve a senior policy advisor, Nathaniel Pearlman the chief technology officer, and Minyon Moore a senior policy advisor. Other campaign workers also date from the "Hillaryland" team of the White House years.

Other advisers and supporters included former Secretary of State Madeleine Albright, Richard Holbrooke, Sandy Berger, Wesley Clark, former Rep. and vice presidential candidate Geraldine Ferraro, former Governor and U.S. Secretary of Education Richard Riley, and former Secretary of Defense William Perry. Less well-known but key region and subject specialists were the focus of an intense recruiting battle between her and fellow candidate Barack Obama.

An October 2007 study of ongoing presidential campaign staffs showed that 8 of her 14 senior staff were women, as were 12 of her 20 top paid staff and 85 of her 161 nominally paid staff; overall she had the largest percentage of women in her campaign of any candidate surveyed other than Mike Huckabee.

=== February 2008 reorganization ===
On February 10, 2008, Solis Doyle ceased duties as campaign manager, and become a senior adviser, traveling with Clinton. Although Solis Doyle claimed the unanticipated length of the primary campaign led to her to resign the post, campaign insiders confirmed that she was ousted. Solis Doyle had survived three previous efforts to oust her.

Maggie Williams was appointed campaign manager; she had been Clinton's chief of staff at the White House. In January, Williams had been brought in on a thirty-day assignment as a senior advisor, and had demanded clarity in the chain of command with the authority to settle internal strategy and policy disputes, threatening to leave the campaign. Within the next few days, Deputy Campaign Manager Mike Henry also stepped down, as did two top staff members for her web-based operations. In two in-depth accounts by Joshua Green in The Atlantic, he attributed Solis Doyle's downfall to her failure to manage campaign spending, her inability to prevent factional disputes within the campaign, and her not recognizing Obama's candidacy as a serious threat earlier. Henry's departure was expected, as Solis Doyle had originally brought him in to the campaign.

=== April 2008 strategist change ===
Chief campaign strategist Mark Penn resigned on April 6, 2008, amid controversy surrounding his work with the Colombian government and the free trade bill opposed by many big unions. Penn resigned after news surfaced he had met with the Colombian ambassador, not as Clinton's adviser but as CEO of his P.R. firm, though he admitted the subject of the meeting was the trade bill. Penn was replaced with Geoff Garin, a respected pollster, who became the chief strategist. He was slated to continue work for the campaign via his polling firm.

== Fundraising ==
Direct mail to targeted New Jersey voters before the Super Tuesday primaries on February 5, 2008.

=== Methods and goals ===
In January 2007 Clinton announced that she would forgo public financing for both the primary and general elections due to the spending limits imposed when accepting the federal money. She had $14 million left from her 2006 Senate race, which put her in a good starting position compared to other Democratic candidates. Clinton insiders said the senator's goal was to raise at least $60 million in 2007. Longtime Democratic political and finance leader Terry McAuliffe was Clinton's campaign chair.

=== HillRaisers ===
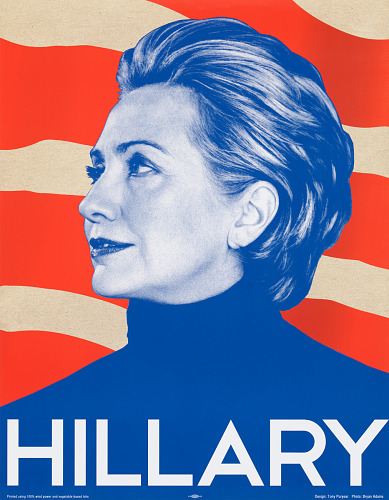
Clinton campaign poster

"Bundlers" that collected more than $100,000 for her campaign became known as "HillRaisers"; (a play on the expression hellraiser) and were asked to raise as much as $1 million each. Elton John raised $2.5 million in a benefit concert for Clinton at Radio City Music Hall, on April 9.

By August 2007, there were 233 HillRaisers. They included Vernon E. Jordan, Jr., Steven Rattner, New Jersey Governor Jon Corzine, U.S. Senator Dianne Feinstein, John Grisham, Magic Johnson, Ronald Perelman, Pennsylvania Governor Ed Rendell, Steven Spielberg and many others.

In late August 2007, HillRaiser Norman Hsu came into considerable negative publicity when it was revealed that he was a 15-year-long fugitive on investment fraud charges and had also possibly engaged in violations of campaign finance law as a "bundler".

In 2015, Alex Heckler was listed as one of Hillary Clinton's most important "bundlers." In 2016, Heckler hosted a fundraising event for Clinton at his Miami beach home.

=== Results ===
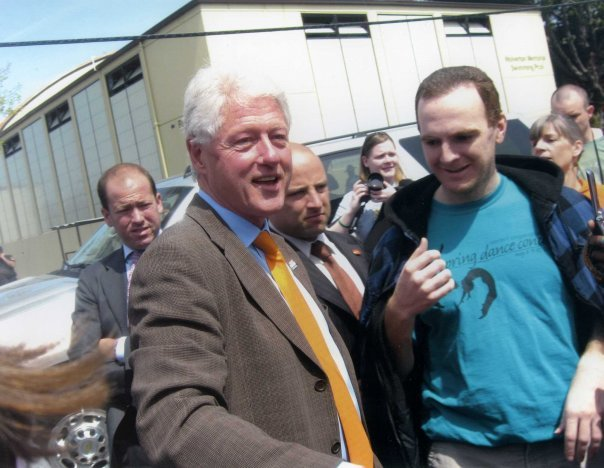
Bill Clinton campaigning for Hillary Clinton in Monmouth, Oregon.

On April 1, 2007, Clinton announced she had raised $26 million during the preceding three months, along with an additional transfer of $10 million from her Senate campaign account to her presidential account. This dwarfed the previous record for the comparable quarter, which was $9 million by Al Gore in 1999.

For the second quarter of 2007, Clinton raised about $27 million, less than Obama's newly set records for the quarter of $32.5 million in donations from 258,000 contributors but more than all other candidates. According to OpenSecrets, during the first six months of the year, about 70% of her funds came from donors giving the maximum $2,300; this compared to 44% for Obama and 42% for Edwards.

For the third quarter of 2007, which typically sees lower numbers than the rest of the year, Clinton led all candidates with $27 million raised and with 100,000 new contributors. This beat Obama's $20 million and allowed Clinton to apportion some of the amount for an expected general election race rather than the primary season.

In the fourth quarter of 2007, Clinton raised approximately $20 million, bringing her total for the year to more than $100 million. This equaled the amount raised by Obama in the quarter, and was also similar to what Republican fundraising Ron Paul garnered during the quarter.

During January 2008, Clinton raised $13.5 million. This paled in comparison to Obama's $32 million for the same month, and Clinton was forced to loan her campaign $5 million from her and Bill Clinton's personal assets. Further, Clinton's campaign ended January with $7.6 million in debt, aside from the personal loan. Rebounding from weak fundraising in January 2008, Sen. Clinton expected to raise $35 million in February 2008—a figure rival Sen. Barack Obama's campaign said it would surpass. On March 6, 2008, it was revealed that Senator Obama raised a record $55 million in February, what the Associated Press reported as the largest amount of funds raised in one month in the history of Presidential primaries.

In April, it was revealed that the Clinton campaign began the month $1 million in debt. While the campaign had $20 million cash on hand, only $9 million was available for the primary and the campaign had $10 million in debt. Clinton adviser Howard Wolfson acknowledged the debt, but noted that "The money continues to come in strongly" and that the campaign would be paying off the debts.

Clinton left the race with $22.5 million in debt, at least $11.4 million of which came from her own pocket.

By the conclusion of the election cycle in November 2008, Clinton's campaign was severely in debt; she owed millions of dollars to outside vendors and wrote off the $13 million that she lent it herself. She continued to raise funds, but then her January 2009 confirmation as U.S. Secretary of State prevented her from doing any political fundraising herself. During the first quarter of 2009, a surprisingly large $5.6 million came into her campaign, enabling her to pay off all creditors other than her pollster Mark Penn, to whom the campaign still owed $2.3 million.

Over time, Bill Clinton took up most of the fundraising burden, sending out fundraising letters, signing campaign memorabilia, and selling appearances with him. By the start of 2012, the debt was down to about $250,000. A team of Obama donors, including Steve Spinner and Jane Watson Stetson, who wanted to thank Clinton for her service during the Obama administration, took up the cause; they used public records to find potential donors who still had not reached contribution limits for 2008. In addition, the Clinton campaign's donor list was rented out to Obama's 2012 re-election campaign, bringing in around $63,000 in October 2012. The Clinton campaign finally declared it had paid off all its debt in a report filed at the beginning of 2013, showing in fact a $205,000 surplus, just as Clinton was about to end her tenure as Secretary of State.

=== Campaign finance irregularities ===
Norman Hsu was a businessman with a background in the apparel industry. By 2007 he was a prominent fundraiser for the Clinton campaign, having achieved HillRaiser status, having co-hosted a $1 million fundraiser at wealthy Democratic Party supporter Ron Burkle's Beverly Hills estate, and having been scheduled to co-host a major gala fundraising event featuring music legend Quincy Jones.

On August 28, 2007, The Wall Street Journal reported that Hsu may have engaged in improper actions during the collection of "bundled" campaign contribution. The Clinton campaign rose to Hsu's defense, saying "Norman Hsu is a longtime and generous supporter of the Democratic party and its candidates, including Senator Clinton. During Mr. Hsu's many years of active participation in the political process, there has been no question about his integrity or his commitment to playing by the rules, and we have absolutely no reason to call his contributions into question."

The next day, on August 29, The Los Angeles Times reported that Hsu was a longtime fugitive, having failed to appear for sentencing for a 1992 fraud conviction. The Clinton campaign reversed course, saying it would give to charity the $23,000 that Hsu personally contributed to her presidential campaign, her Senate re-election and her political action committee. The campaign said it did not plan to give away funds that Hsu had collected from other donors.

Although Hsu had donated to other Democratic candidates, scrutiny was focused on the Clinton campaign, with mainstream press reports asking why the campaign had been unable to take steps to discover Hsu's past. and speculating that opponents would liken developments to the 1996 United States campaign finance controversy. Clinton said the Hsu revelations were "a big surprise to everybody." She added that, "When you have as many contributors as I’m fortunate enough to have, we do the very best job we can based on the information available to us to make appropriate vetting decisions."

On September 5, Hsu failed to appear for a court hearing and became a fugitive again. The Clinton campaign said, "We believe that Mr. Hsu, like any individual who has obligations before the court, should be meeting them, and he should do so now." Hsu was recaptured less than 48 hours later.

By September 10, newspaper reports indicated that the FBI was looking into the legitimacy of an investment pool that Hsu had been running at the time of his large-scale contributing. Moreover, Irvine, California businessman Jack Cassidy said he had, as early as June 2007, tried to warn authorities and the Clinton campaign that Hsu was running an illicit enterprise, and that both officials and the Clinton campaign had been non-responsive. A California Democratic Party query at the time in June was responded to by the Clinton campaign's western finance director: "I can tell you with 100 certainty that Norman Hsu is not involved in a ponzi scheme. He is completely legit." The campaign later said it had further looked at Hsu's public records at the time, but that no problems had emerged.

Later on September 10, the Clinton campaign announced it would return the full $850,000 in donations that Hsu had raised from others: "In light of recent events and allegations that Mr. Norman Hsu engaged in an illegal investment scheme, we have decided out of an abundance of caution to return the money he raised for our campaign. An estimated 260 donors this week will receive refunds totaling approximately $850,000 from the campaign." In doing so, the Clinton camp set a precedent for how campaigns should deal with potential "bundling" scandals. The campaign also announced it would put into place tougher procedures for vetting major contributors, including running criminal background checks. Hsu-raised bundles had also gone to Clinton's political action committee and to her 2006 Senate re-election campaign; Clinton officials were undecided regarding what to do with those funds.

In the following days, campaign strategists were worried that the Hsu matter had the potential to become a major fundraising scandal that could significantly damage the campaign. Nevertheless, the campaign indicated that it would try to get donations re-given right after the refunds, for example taking back donations if they clearly came from the donor's bank account rather than from Hsu or another third party and if the donor swears the money is their own. Clinton herself affirmed this position: "I believe that the vast majority of those two-hundred-plus donors are perfectly capable of making up their own minds."

The political watchdog organization Judicial Watch said it would try to get the U.S. Justice Department and the Senate Ethics Committee to investigate the Hsu matter. Clinton aides stressed that Hsu had never received favorable treatment from her: "The Senate office had no official contact with him, and undertook no actions on his behalf." Clinton herself called the whole affair "a rude awakening to all of us," meaning other campaigns as well.

By October 2007 the Hsu matter had quieted down. Clinton's third quarter campaign expenditures report showed the $800,000 in contributions, mostly Hsu-related, being returned to more than 200 donors, some of whom were surprised to see the money coming back and who said they knew not of Hsu.

In March 2007, a Pakistani immigrant named Abdul Rehman Jinnah was indicted by a grand jury for violating federal election laws. The charges stem from $30,000 in illegal contributions to Clinton's presidential campaign. Her campaign "denied any knowledge of Jinnah's scheme."

In September 2007, reports were made that William Danielczyk, private equity firm head, bundled money for Clinton from Republican Party supporters, including at least one who claimed that Danielczyk later reimbursed her, a charge Danielczyk denied. The Clinton campaign returned that donation, and said: "These allegations are troubling and we will again ask each of the individuals solicited by Mr. Danielczyk to affirm that their contributions were given with their own funds."

In October 2007, an article in the Los Angeles Times stated that, "Dishwashers, waiters and others whose jobs and dilapidated home addresses seem to make them unpromising targets for political fundraisers are pouring $1,000 and $2,000 contributions into Clinton's campaign treasury. In April, a single fundraiser in an area long known for its gritty urban poverty yielded a whopping $380,000." . The Times further stated, "At this point in the presidential campaign cycle, Clinton has raised more money than any candidate in history. Those dishwashers, waiters and street stall hawkers are part of the reason. And Clinton's success in gathering money from Chinatown's least-affluent residents stems from a two-pronged strategy: mutually beneficial alliances with powerful groups, and appeals to the hopes and dreams of people now consigned to the margins." . The New York Post reported similar findings. The Washington Post editorialized that reports such as these appear "to be another instance in which a Clinton campaign's zeal for campaign cash overwhelms its judgment," comparing it to the 1996 Clinton-Gore finance controversy of her husband.

In December 2007, the Sri Lankan Ministry of Defence and the Canada Free Press reported that one of Clinton's fundraisers in New Jersey, a U.S. resident who was associated with a December 12 fundraising event at the State Theatre in New Brunswick, New Jersey, was also a fundraiser for the Tamil Rehabilitation Organization, which the U.S. government has determined is a front organization for the Liberation Tigers of Tamil Eelam, which is on the U.S. State Department list of Foreign Terrorist Organizations. In February 2008, Clinton's foreign policy adviser, Andrew Shapiro, announced that the Clinton campaign had returned the T.R.O. donations after complaints of impropriety given the outlawed T.R.O.'s terrorist links

A February 13, 2008, NPR article stated (with regard to mailing lists) that "Last year, New York Sen. Hillary Clinton took the unusual step of renting out some of her lists." The Clinton campaign responded "that the lists were rented out by her 2006 Senate campaign committee — and that the rentals took place before she began her formal campaign for president last January." Of this response NPR commented, "That would mean the rental fees went unpaid for at least 11 months. Starke, the analyst, cites Info U.S.A. data showing that on average, it settles accounts within 64 days."

== Caucuses and primaries 2008 ==
=== Iowa ===
In the initial delegate selection event of 2008, she placed third with 29.45 percent of the state delegate selections in the January 3, Iowa Democratic caucus to Obama's 37.58 percent and Edwards' 29.75 percent. In terms of the actual number of delegates that would later be selected to the national convention, the difference between the top three candidates was minor, with Clinton possibly ahead of Edwards. Nevertheless, in terms of damaging her image as the "inevitable" leader in the race and in giving Obama considerable momentum, this was a major blow to Clinton's campaign. She remained upbeat in her remarks that night, saying that "This race begins tonight and ends when Democrats throughout America have their say. Our campaign was built for a marathon, and we have the resources to run a national race in the weeks ahead." The following day, reports described "panic" among some Clinton donors; some Clinton supporters began questioning the soundness of her strategy and the ability of her top campaign advisors, with chief strategist Mark Penn the focus of particular criticism.

=== New Hampshire ===
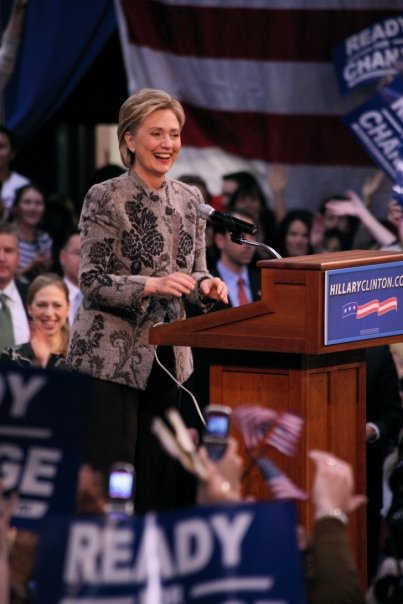
Hillary Clinton greets supporters after her New Hampshire Primary win.

Polling showed a tight race in the days leading up to the New Hampshire primary. While some polls showed a dead heat between Clinton and Obama, January 6 polls conducted by CNN/WMUR-TV and USA Today/Gallup showed Obama jumping ahead by 10 and 13 points respectively after winning Iowa. All of the candidates campaigned in New Hampshire during the four days after the Iowa caucuses, targeting undecided and independent voters in the state.

At the ABC News/WMUR-TV Democratic debate in Manchester on January 5, Clinton, Obama, and Edwards all battled over who best exemplified the buzzword of the campaign, "change", with Obama and Edwards teaming up against Clinton. In one noted exchange, Edwards said that Clinton could not bring change, while he and Obama can. "Any time you speak out powerfully for change, the forces for status quo attack." He made clear that he was referring to Clinton, adding, "I didn't hear these kind of attacks from Senator Clinton while she was ahead. Now that she's not we hear them." Clinton passionately retorted: "Making change is not about what you believe; it's not about a speech you make. It's about working hard. I'm not just running on a promise for change. I'm running on 35 years of change. What we need is somebody who can deliver change. We don't need to be raising false hopes." At another point, when one moderator asked Clinton why polls showed she was less "likeable" than other candidates, particularly Obama, she joked tongue-in-cheek, "Well that hurts my feelings ... but I'll try to go on."

In the wake of the Iowa defeat, the campaign hoped that Bill Clinton could help salvage a win in New Hampshire, where he had achieved a political comeback in his 1992 presidential campaign. As he had in Iowa, the former president campaigned intensively, but his New Hampshire appearances failed to draw large or enthusiastic crowds. On the day before the primary, press reports indicated that Hillary Clinton advisers were pessimistic about the immediate future, thinking it was unlikely she would be able to win either New Hampshire or South Carolina.

That same morning, Clinton became "visibly emotional" at a stop in Portsmouth, when after a friendly question from a voter about how she kept going on the campaign trail, she said, "It's not easy, and I couldn't do it if I just didn't, you know, passionately believe it was the right thing to do."

On election day, January 8, 2008, seven different polls led to a win for Obama, by margins from 5 points to 13 points, with an average of 8.3 points. Elegies were published on the Clinton campaign. Weather was good and voter turnout was reported as heavy all day long, with election officials worried they might run out of ballots; the large turnout was expected to favor Obama. During the day and into the evening there were reports of a major shakeup in Clinton's campaign staff scheduled for the next day, in the wake of an expected loss.

In contrast to expectations, Clinton won New Hampshire gaining about 39 percent of the vote compared to Obama's 36 percent. In her victory remarks to supporters that evening, Clinton said, "I come tonight with a full heart. Over the last week, I listened to you, and in the process I found my own voice." Clinton's win was the first time a woman had ever won a major American party's presidential primary for the purposes of delegate selection. (Shirley Chisholm's prior "win" in New Jersey in 1972 was in a no-delegate-awarding, presidential preference ballot that the major candidates were not listed in and that the only other candidate who was listed had already withdrawn from; the actual delegate selection vote went to George McGovern.)

The day after her win New Hampshire, Chris Matthews appearing on MSNBC's Morning Joe said of Clinton: "I'll be brutal, the reason she's a U.S. senator, the reason she's a candidate for president, the reason she may be a front-runner is her husband messed around. That's how she got to be senator from New York. We keep forgetting it. She didn't win there on her merit." The comments were criticized as unfair and harsh by diverse media figures as Bill O'Reilly, Joy Behar and Gloria Steinem, and led to protests outside NBC's Washington, D.C. studios, as well as a joint letter of complaint to NBC from the National Organization for Women, Feminist Majority and the National Women's Political Caucus. Matthews apologized for the comments on the January 17, 2008 edition of his own MSNBC program, Hardball.

In the following days, media outlets engaged in self-examinatory listing of the many faults of their coverage, while pundits advanced dozens of theories to explain the unexpected result. The reason for the comeback that most captured the public imagination was her humanization in the last days of the campaign, in particular the "likeability" issue being raised in the debate and her moment becoming became "visibly emotional" the day before which resonated with female voters.

Meanwhile, Internet theories sprung questioning the voting and arguing that there were discrepancies between machine-counted votes (which supported Clinton overall) and hand-counted votes (which supported Obama overall). Fifth-place finisher Dennis Kucinich's campaign paid $25,000 to have a recount done of all Democratic ballots cast in the primary, saying "It is imperative that these questions be addressed in the interest of public confidence in the integrity of the election process and the election machinery." On January 16 the New Hampshire Secretary of State's office began the recount. After recounting 23 percent of the state's Democratic primary votes, the Secretary of State announced that no significant difference was found in any candidate's total, and that the oft-discussed discrepancy between hand-counted and machine-counted ballots was solely due to demographic factors.

=== Maya Angelou ===
American poet, author, and actress, Maya Angelou recited her poem, "On the Pulse of Morning" at President Bill Clinton's inauguration in 1993, the first poet to do so since Robert Frost at John F. Kennedy's inauguration in 1961. In January 2008, Angelou announced that she wrote a poem for Hillary entitled State Package for Hillary Clinton for The Observer. On the subject of writing the poem, The Guardian stated that, "Angelou is steadfast in her loyalty to Clinton. She said recently: 'I made up my mind 15 years ago that if she ever ran for office I'd be on her wagon' [...] Angelou says that she has had many long telephone conversations with [Oprah] Winfrey on the subject of Obama versus Clinton. 'She thinks he's the best, and I think my woman is the best,' she has explained. 'Oprah is a daughter to me, but she is not my clone.'" On April 30, 2008, Angelou made a public endorsement of Clinton.

=== Issues of race ===
Issues of race came to the forefront as campaigning began for the January 26 South Carolina primary, the first to feature large African American participation in the Democratic electorate. First, in the closing stages of the New Hampshire campaign, Bill Clinton had referred to Obama's claim that he has been a staunch opponent of the Iraq War from the beginning as a "fairy tale," which some subsequently thought was a characterization of Obama's entire campaign. The former president called into Al Sharpton's radio show to personally clarify that he respected Obama and believed in his viability.

Around the same time, Hillary Clinton discussed Martin Luther King Jr. and President Lyndon Johnson in an interview for Fox News. She stated that, "I would point to the fact that that Dr. King's dream began to be realized when President Johnson passed the Civil Rights Act of 1964, when he was able to get through Congress something that President Kennedy was hopeful to do, the President before had not even tried, but it took a president to get it done. That dream became a reality, the power of that dream became a real in people's lives because we had a president who said we are going to do it, and actually got it accomplished." Some African-American leaders took this statement as a denigration of the accomplishments of King and the larger Civil Rights Movement. Hillary Clinton blamed Obama for the controversy, claiming his campaign had fanned the flames, a charge which Obama dismissed as "ludicrous". Shortly before, and during, a January 15 Democratic debate in Nevada, Clinton and Obama declared a truce on the matter, with both making reconciliatory statements about race, gender, and each other. However, there was concern that Clinton's support among some African Americans may have been damaged, with SUNY Albany's Debra Dickerson stating "The Clintons have to do something dramatic and symbolic to win back the trust of many African-Americans."

In part the tension resulted from the historical coincidence of the first viable female presidential candidate, and the first viable African American candidate, running against each other in the same nomination race. One South Carolina pastor lamented that he had been waiting all his life for either "first" to happen, and said, "I really hate that they had to run at the same time in the same election. It just makes what should be a wonderful situation very stressful for folk like me. I never imagined you could have too much of a good thing." Clinton acknowledged that she understood the situation: "I wish it didn't have to be a choice. I think a lot of people who are torn between us feel that way. But it is a contest ..." Feminism and the civil rights movement had a long intertwined history in the United States, often working in concert but sometimes opposed; while the bitter 19th century split between Elizabeth Cady Stanton and Frederick Douglass illustrated the latter, the unified opposition to the Supreme Court nomination of Clarence Thomas had exemplified the former. After the Clinton-Obama tension on this matter, one Democrat interviewed by the Financial Times said, "After Iowa, Obama was the post-racial candidate who appealed to all of our better natures. Now he's a black politician and she's a woman. And it is back to politics as usual."

=== Michigan – maybe ===
Because of a party dispute over scheduling, the January 15 Michigan primary lost its delegates to the national convention, and all major candidates signed a pledge "not to campaign or participate" in Michigan's primary. The majority of candidates, including Richardson, Edwards and Obama, interpreted the pledge as requiring the removal of their names from the Michigan ballot. Clinton, however, decided to keep her name on the ballot, only agreeing to the "campaign" part of the pledge. Thus, little or no campaigning was done there (in the actual vote, Clinton would win nothing with 55 percent of the vote against 40 percent for an uncommitted slate) and attention instead moved to the January 19 Nevada caucuses.

Later, in the month, Clinton announced that she wanted a Michigan delegation (and Florida's, in the same circumstance) seated at the convention, saying "I hear all the time from people in Florida and Michigan that they want their voices heard in selecting the Democratic nominee. I believe our nominee will need the enthusiastic support of Democrats in these states to win the general election, and so I will ask my Democratic convention delegates to support seating the delegations from Florida and Michigan." This seemed to contradict her previous statement on NH public radio where she said, "Well, you know, it's clear, this election they're having is not going to count for anything." The Obama campaign responded that it was clear these contests were for no delegates and that "it seems like Hillary Clinton will do or say anything to win an election."

=== Nevada ===
The Clinton campaign benefited from a surge in fundraising after its New Hampshire win, garnering $6 million in new funds. Robby Mook served as Clinton's state director in Nevada.

In Nevada, Obama gained the valuable endorsement of the Culinary Workers Union, whose 60,000 members staff the casinos and resorts of Las Vegas and elsewhere. Clinton countered by appealing to the Hispanic vote in the state, emphasizing that they were at special risk from the fallout from the subprime mortgage crisis. Meanwhile, a proxy legal battle between Clinton and Obama broke out over the creation of special at-large precincts within nine Las Vegas resorts, which were approved in 2007 to allow casino employees a chance to participate in the caucuses, as many employees could not leave the casinos during voting hours. Clinton supporters said they violated equal protection and one-person-one-vote requirements, and the Nevada State Education Association filed a lawsuit seeking to eliminate the casino caucus sites. The organization did not officially endorse Clinton, but many of its top officials have done so. This led Obama to allege that the suit was filed in order to hurt his chances at the caucuses. "Some of the people who set up the rules apparently didn't think we'd be as competitive as we were and are trying to change them last minute," he said.

On January 17, a federal judge ruled that the casino at-large caucus plan could go ahead. This was seen as a win for Obama because of the Culinary Workers Union endorsement.

To further complicate matters, the major news and polling organizations decided to not do any polls before the Nevada caucuses, fearing the newness of the caucus, the transient nature of Nevada's population, and more fallout from their bad experience in New Hampshire. In one of the few polls that was conducted, the Las Vegas Review-Journal reported that Clinton was ahead by 9 points.

Clinton finished first in the caucuses on January 19, winning 51% of delegates to the state convention compared to 45% for Obama. After the caucuses, there was dispute over which candidate would send more delegates to the national convention. It appeared that Obama won 13 to Clinton's 12, because the apportionment of delegates is based on county totals. Delegates to the national convention will be determined officially at the April 19 state convention, and the Nevada Democratic Party said that it was not necessarily true that state delegate preferences would remain the same by that time. On January 23, the Obama campaign filed an official letter of complaint with the Nevada Democratic Party charging the Clinton campaign with many violations of party rules during the caucuses, based upon 1,600 complaints they had received. The Clinton camp said the Obama operation was "grasping at straws" and that they had their own complaints about Obama campaign actions during the caucuses.

=== South Carolina ===
The issues of race that came to the forefront had no greater effect than where campaigning began for the January 26 South Carolina primary, the first to feature large African American participation in the Democratic electorate. The January 22 CNN/Congressional Black Caucus debate in Myrtle Beach was according to CNN a "debate punctuated by sharp exchanges." Clinton criticized Obama for voting "present" on many occasions while in the Illinois Senate. "It's hard to have a straight up debate with you because you never take responsibility for any vote," she said. Obama said that he was working to help unemployed workers in Chicago while Clinton was "a corporate lawyer sitting on the board at Wal-Mart." He also took issue with statements made on the campaign trail by Bill Clinton, saying "I can't tell who I'm running against sometimes." It was the most-watched primary season debate in cable television news history. In the days after the debate, Hillary Clinton left to campaign in some Super Duper Tuesday states, while Bill Clinton stayed in South Carolina and engaged in a series of exchanges with Obama. Clinton's decision to leave the state was subject to criticism. Hillary aides responded by stating that criticism directed towards Clinton was created in order to "undermine the former president". Edwards stayed clear of the fray in the debate and later said that he represented the "grown-up wing" of the party.

Bill Clinton attracted controversy for his participation in his wife's campaign after a series of attacks made on his part against Obama, which many former Clinton supporters felt to be unfair. While some felt the attacks against Obama may eventually pay off, others felt it would damage Hillary Clinton's presidential prospects and alienate Democratic voters in the general election if she won the nomination. There was also concern that the former president was overshadowing the candidate on the campaign trail. According to CBS, "By injecting himself into the Democratic primary campaign with a series of inflammatory and negative statements, Bill Clinton may have helped his wife's presidential hopes in the long term but at the cost of his reputation with a group of voters that have long been one of his strongest bases of political support." Some critics accused Clinton of "pulling the race card" against Barack Obama.

On January 26, Obama won by a more than two-to-one margin over Clinton, gaining 55 percent of the vote to her 27 percent and Edwards' 18 percent. Bill Clinton had compared Obama's victory to Jesse Jackson's victory in the 1988 South Carolina primary, in which he said "Jackson ran a good campaign. And Obama ran a good campaign here." He would be criticized for these comments because they were widely seen as implying that Obama was "the black candidate. " Hillary Clinton would later apologize for her husband's remarks in front of the State of the Black Union conference. Clinton had already left the state and gave her concession speech from Tennessee State University, where she said she was looking forward to the February 5 Super Duper Tuesday contests.

=== Kennedy family endorsements ===
In late 2007, Robert F. Kennedy Jr. and his sisters Kathleen Kennedy Townsend and Kerry Kennedy (children of the late Senator and United States Attorney General, Robert F. Kennedy) announced that they would be endorsing Hillary Clinton.

On January 27, 2008, their cousin Caroline Kennedy (President John F. Kennedy's daughter) announced in a New York Times op-ed piece entitled, "A President Like My Father", that she would endorse Barack Obama in the 2008 U.S. presidential election. On the same day, her uncle Senator Ted Kennedy announced that he would endorse Obama despite appeals by both Clintons not to do so. Senator Kennedy's endorsement was considered among the most influential that any Democrat could get. In particular, it raised the possibility of improving Obama's vote-getting among unions, Hispanics, and traditional base Democrats. It was later followed by an announcement that his son Congressman Patrick Kennedy of Rhode Island's 1st District would also endorse Obama. Obama was also subsequently endorsed by Robert F. Kennedy's widow, Ethel Kennedy, and two of their children, Max Kennedy and Rory Kennedy

In response to these endorsements, Robert, Kathleen, and Kerry wrote in a January 29, 2008, editorial, "By now you may have read or heard that our cousin, Caroline Kennedy, and our uncle, Sen. Edward M. Kennedy, have come out in favor of Sen. Barack Obama. We, however, are supporting Sen. Hillary Rodham Clinton because we believe that she is the strongest candidate for our party and our country." California Governor Arnold Schwarzenegger, a member of the Kennedy family through his marriage to Maria Shriver, an Obama supporter, commented, "What is surprising is that I think for the first time, the family is not in sync [...] three of them have endorsed Barack Obama and three of them have endorsed Hillary Clinton. I think that's the interesting story there." Shriver's brother, Anthony Shriver, supported Clinton as well.

=== Impact of Bill Clinton ===
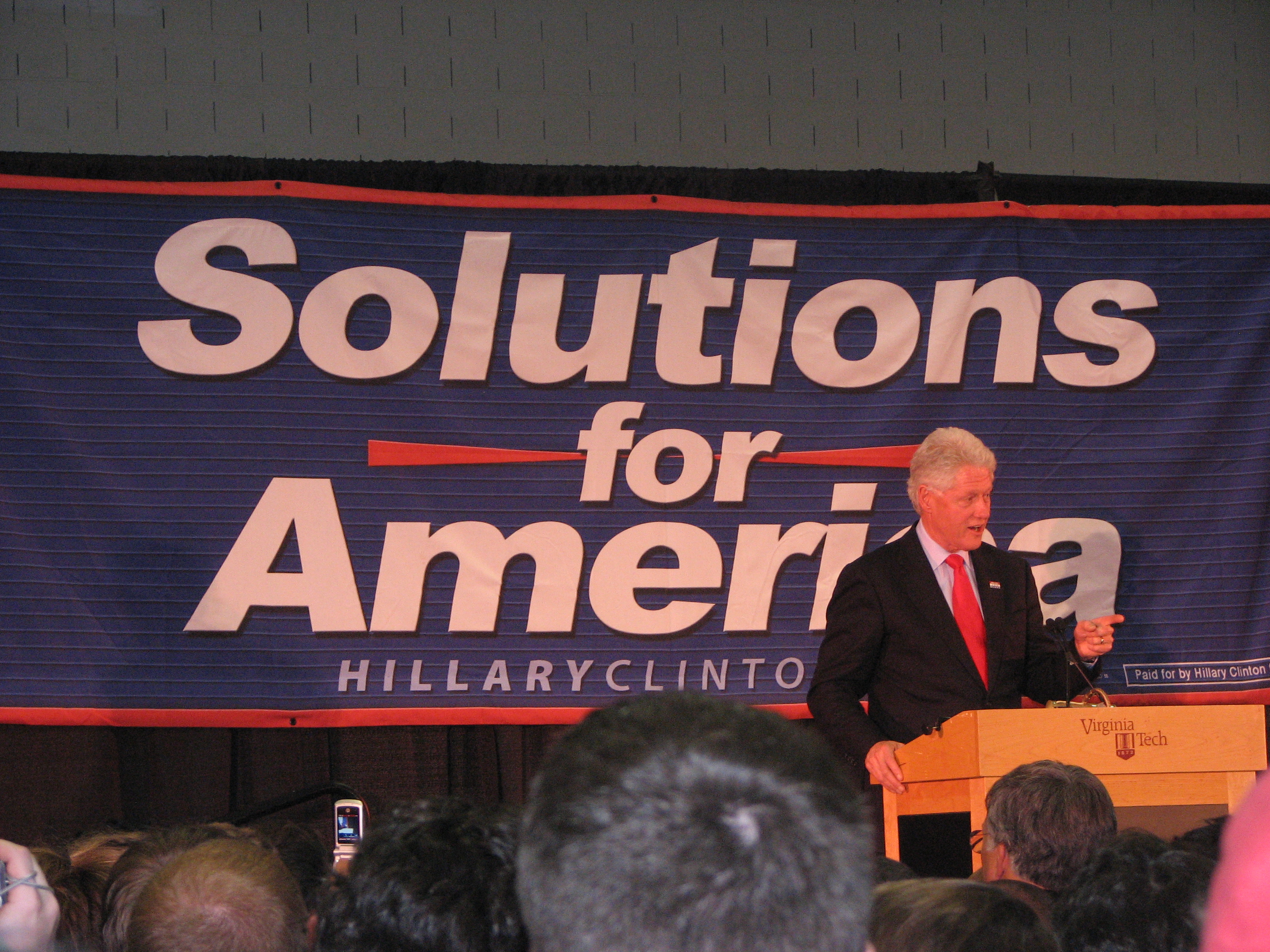
Bill Clinton campaigning for Hillary Clinton at Virginia Tech. February 9, 2008.

After South Carolina, the Clinton campaign sought to find a "gentler" role for Bill Clinton, whose actions during the South Carolina campaign and earlier was suspected of having polarized the Democratic electorate and harming Hillary Clinton's standing among women, in addition to having contributed to Ted Kennedy's decision to endorse Obama. Congressman Charles Rangel, an outspoken Hillary Clinton supporter, said of Bill Clinton, "He's got to [pull back]. The focus has got to get back on Hillary. For all that he cares about his wife, this has to be her election to win, and it's become too much about his role." By two days after South Carolina, CNN's Candy Crowley reported that there was "a huge wave" of sentiment inside and outside the Clinton campaign that the former President "needs to stop."

Bill Clinton did subsequently maintain a lower profile on the campaign, relying on standard talking points and rarely mentioning Obama by name, or if he did, praising him: "I'm not against anybody. I'm for Hillary ... If you disagree, you have another very attractive choice." Bill Clinton said that in retrospect, "Everything I have said has been factually accurate, but I think the mistake I made was to think I was a spouse just like any other spouse who could defend his candidate. I think I can promote Hillary but not defend her because I was president."

By late February, with Hillary Clinton trailing further behind Obama, one unnamed senior adviser to her campaign said that in hindsight it had been unwise to use Bill Clinton as much as they had, as "his presence, aura and legacy caused national fatigue with the Clintons."

=== Florida – maybe ===
The Florida Primary on January 29, like the earlier Michigan one, had had its delegates stripped from it due to its jumping too early in the primary season. The Democratic candidates agreed not to campaign in the state, although unlike Michigan all were on the ballot here. Several days before the primary, Clinton announced that she believed Florida delegates should get seated at the national convention.

Despite no delegates apparently being at stake, over 1.5 million Democrats voted in the primary. Clinton won with 50 percent of the vote, compared to 33 percent for Obama and 14 percent for Edwards. Clinton was in Florida that evening and gave a brief victory speech, saying, "You know, I could not come here to ask in person for your votes. But I am here to thank you for your votes today. This has been a record turnout because Floridians wanted their voices to be heard on the great issues that affect our country and the world."

=== Super Tuesday ===
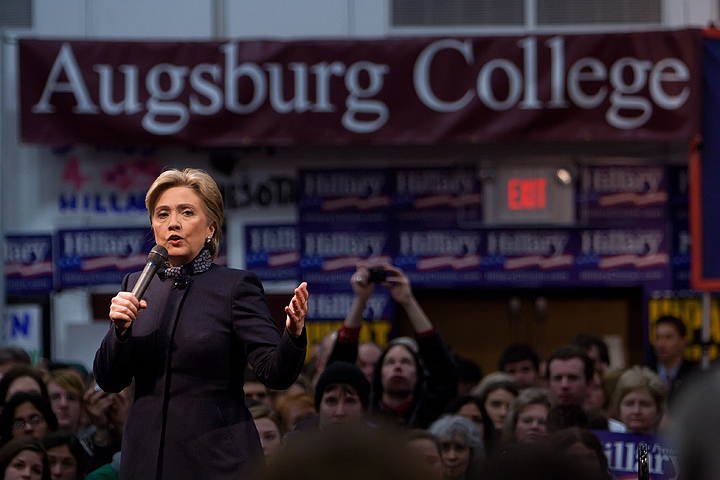
Clinton campaigning at Augsburg College in Minneapolis, Minnesota, two days before the twenty-two state vote.

Super Tuesday took place on February 5, 2008, with twenty-two states holding Democratic caucuses or primary elections on this date. It was preceded by two events for Clinton. The first was a debate held at the Kodak Theatre in Los Angeles on January 31 which was notable for its civil tone. The second was Voices Across America: A National Town Hall which was broadcast on the Hallmark Channel at 9 pm on February 4. During this time, Clinton also announced that she had loaned her campaign $5 million. Of this loan Clinton commented, "I loaned it because I believe very strongly in this campaign. We had a great month fund-raising in January, broke all records. But my opponent was able to raise more money."

There were a number of issues at stake going into Super Tuesday, with no clear winner assured in the race. One critical factor was the California primary which was deemed the "biggest prize in the Super Tuesday contest: the state delivers 370 delegates for the Democratic candidates." In the California contest, Clinton had gained three important endorsements: Congresswoman Maxine Waters, Los Angeles Mayor Antonio Villaraigosa, and San Francisco Mayor Gavin Newsom.

Clinton won nine states on Super Tuesday including important delegate rich ones: the California Primary, 52% to 42%, with 204 delegates for Clinton and 160 for Obama; the New York Primary 57% to 40% with 139 delegates for Clinton and 93 for Obama; the New Jersey Primary 54% to 44% with 59 delegates for Clinton and 48 for Obama; the Arizona Primary 51% to 42% with 31 delegates for Clinton and 25 for Obama; the Arkansas Primary 70% to 20% with 27 delegates for Clinton and 8 for Obama; Oklahoma Primary, 61% to 37%, of which Clinton gained 24 delegates and Obama 14; and Tennessee Primary, 54% to 41%, of which Clinton gained 40 delegates and Obama 28. She also won the Massachusetts Primary 56% to 41%, of which Clinton gained 55 delegates and Obama 38. The Massachusetts Primary was described by The Guardian as a "symbolically important triumph" for Clinton. New Mexico had to postpone declaring a winner in order to conduct a recount. Clinton was announced the winner of New Mexico on February 14. Obama won the primaries in Alabama, Connecticut, Delaware, Illinois, Missouri and Utah. He also won all of the states which held caucuses – Alaska, Colorado, Idaho, Kansas, Minnesota and North Dakota; among the reasons for this were his campaign's fundraising advantage, which allowed him to procure the costly ground operations crucial to success in caucuses. According to CBS News estimates, Obama won 803 pledged delegates on Super Tuesday and Clinton took 799.

Within a few days after Super Tuesday, Clinton raised $10 million from 100,000 donors.

=== Louisiana, Nebraska, Washington, and Maine ===
Clinton competed in Washington, with advertising and personal appearances, as well as in Maine, with Bill Clinton going to Louisiana. In Washington, which had the most delegates at stake, Clinton had the endorsements of Senators Patty Murray and Maria Cantwell, but lost Governor Chris Gregoire to Obama. Nebraska was visited by daughter Chelsea Clinton, who talked to students at Creighton University.

On February 9, Clinton lost the Louisiana primary 57% to 36%, the Nebraska caucuses 68% to 32%, and the Washington caucuses 68% to 31%. Across the three states, Obama gaining 84 delegates to Clinton's 45. On February 10, Clinton lost the Maine caucus 59% to 40%. Obama gained 15 delegates to Clinton's 9.

=== The Potomac primary ===
The "Potomac primary", with votes cast in Maryland, Virginia, and the District of Columbia, was held on February 12.

Clinton made personal appearances in the District, Maryland, and Virginia. Obama was able to begin his television advertising in the states earlier than Clinton, due to his campaign's fundraising advantage. Clinton lost the D.C. primary 75% to 24%, the Maryland primary 61% to 36%, and the Virginia Primary 64% to 35%.

Clinton herself responded to the loss by stating, "I think everybody knew that he was favored there. My husband lost Maryland when he was running in the primary. We go on. We're ready for the contests that are upcoming. There are hundreds of delegates that will be in play on March 4. We are well organized and well positioned." Regarding a response to Obama's win CNN argued, "for the second election night in a row, Hillary Clinton failed to acknowledge or congratulate Barack Obama after he won the day in dominating fashion." CBS, however, quoted Clinton as telling reporters, 'I want to congratulate Senator Obama on his recent victories and tell him to meet me in Texas, we're ready.'"

On February 14, a national poll by Ipsos-Public Affairs placed Clinton at 46% and Obama at 41%. National polls from Rasmussen and Gallup were released the same day. Rasmussen showed Obama ahead 49–37, and Gallup had the race virtually even, with Obama holding a one-point lead. The same day, Obama passed Clinton in the overall Pollster.com aggregate national poll for the first time during the campaign. NBC News noted that even if Florida and Michigan were included in the tally, Obama led in the total popular vote after the Potomac primary.

=== Role of superdelegates ===
Following the Potomac primary, the potential role of superdelegates in deciding the Democratic nomination was heavily discussed. In particular, the possibility of one candidate gaining more pledged delegates from primary and caucus wins, but losing the nomination to the other due to the decisions of superdelegates, made some Democratic leaders uncomfortable. The Clinton camp, behind in pledged delegates, advocated that superdelegates exercise their own judgment in deciding which candidate to back; Clinton campaign worker Geraldine Ferraro argued for this option, with Ferraro stating, "The superdelegates were created to lead, not to follow." The Obama camp, ahead in pledged delegates, advocated that superdelegates follow the will of the voters and back whichever candidate had the most pledged delegates. Some party leaders, such as U.S. Speaker of the House Nancy Pelosi, argued for the latter interpretation, while others such as Democratic National Committee chair Howard Dean argued for the former interpretation.

African American superdelegates previously pledged to Clinton, found themselves under pressure to switch to supporting Obama's historic candidacy; Representative Jesse Jackson Jr. suggested that those staying with Clinton might face Democratic primary challenges in the future. MoveOn.org started an Internet petition to urge superdelegates to "let the voters decide between Clinton and Obama, then support the people's choice."

Clinton was viewed as having an institutional advantage in amassing superdelegates by virtue of her fifteen years of national prominence in party politics. However, Obama had heavily outspent Clinton in previous contributions to superdelegates through their political action committees.

Whether or not Clinton actually could prevail with the help of party-appointed superdelegates was also an increasingly debated question, as Obama gained 47 new superdelegates between Super Tuesday and mid-March, while Clinton lost 7.

=== Wisconsin and Hawaii ===
The Wisconsin primary and the Hawaii caucuses were next on the campaign schedule. Chelsea Clinton made appearances at four Wisconsin universities: University of Wisconsin–Milwaukee, University of Wisconsin–Madison, University of Wisconsin–La Crosse, and University of Wisconsin–Eau Claire. WISN-TV noted Chelsea's statement at UW–Milwaukee that, "On the war in Iraq, '[her mother] would end it the first day (in office) if she could,' but acknowledges that it would take about 60 days to come up with a plan to withdraw our troops and set up a workable plan to leave." Chelsea also planned to appear for her mother in Honolulu and in Maui.

Hillary Clinton reduced her already limited scheduled appearances in Wisconsin, with her campaign feeling disadvantaged by Governor of Wisconsin Jim Doyle's endorsement of Obama and the fact that independent voters are able to vote in the state's Democratic primary. Clinton made Obama's refusals to add any additional debates to the campaign schedule a primary focus of her messaging in Wisconsin, saying, "I will meet Senator Obama any place in the state. There's only been one debate between the two of us. This has only been a two person race for a little over two weeks. And I think it's a real disservice to the people of Wisconsin that you haven't had a chance to see the tough questions asked and answered." Obama responded by saying, "We've had 18 debates. Eighteen debates!" Obama outspent Clinton 4–1 in television advertising in the state, and was able to get on the air earlier than Clinton due to his campaign's greater financial strength. Clinton did air a large number of negative ads against Obama in the final days of the campaign.

The most publicized charge which Clinton used against Obama preceding the Wisconsin primary were accusations that he plagiarized portions of his campaign's national co-chair Governor Deval Patrick of Massachusetts. The lines Obama used were in response to charges by Clinton that his campaign offered "speeches but not solutions." The lines Obama used were almost verbatim from portions of a speech made by Patrick in 2006, stating "Don't tell me words don't matter.'I have a dream.' Just words? 'We hold these truths to be self-evident, that all men are created equal.' Just words! 'We have nothing to fear but fear itself.' Just words – just speeches!" Obama stated that he borrowed the lines after being recommend to do so by Patrick who had faced similar attacks that he was only offering talk but not action.

On February 19, Clinton's losing streak to Obama stretched to ten in a row. Obama won the Wisconsin primary 58 percent to 41 percent, with a trend continuing of Clinton losing support in demographics that had previously been most favorable to her, such as women, lower-income families, and people who belong to labor unions. That evening, when Clinton's televised remarks did not include acknowledgment of Obama's victory, he started his own victory remarks before she finished, causing the cable news channels' to switch their live coverage to Obama. Obama also won the Hawaii caucuses overwhelmingly, 76 percent to 24 percent, in the state where he was born, spent much of his childhood, and still has family. The New York Times termed the night's results and demographic trends "grim tidings for Mrs. Clinton," while the Los Angeles Times headlined, "Wisconsin: Beginning of the end for Clinton?" and the Associated Press described her campaign as "fading".

Two days later, the results of the worldwide Democrats Abroad primary were announced, with Obama winning by a wide margin and stretching Clinton's losing streak to eleven.

=== Ohio, Rhode Island, Texas, and Vermont ===
The Ohio primary, Rhode Island primary, Texas primary and Texas caucus, and Vermont primary took place on March 4. The delegate-rich Ohio and Texas primaries were considered to be top prizes for both candidates: Ohio offers 141 pledged delegates and Texas 193. A number of news organizations, most notably cable television network Fox News named the March 4 primaries and caucuses "Super Tuesday II."

In Texas, a Houston rally was held on February 10 in support of Clinton. On February 12, according to CBS, Hillary received a "rock star welcome" when she spoke before a crowd of 12,000 at the University of Texas at El Paso.

In Ohio, polls released on February 13 indicated that Clinton had a 17-point lead. She gained the endorsement of Ohio Governor Ted Strickland and Ohio First Lady Frances Strickland, of astronaut and former Senator John Glenn, and of Akron mayor Don Plusquellic. She also gained the endorsement of the Columbus Dispatch. In mid February Chelsea Clinton's campaigning for her mother included visits to Cleveland State University, the University of Akron Ohio State, and Ohio Wesleyan.

In Rhode Island, a February 13 Brown University poll for the state indicated Clinton was the choice of 36 percent of voters surveyed while Obama was supported by 28 percent.

As Obama solidified his lead, Clinton shook things up with a revamped message and sharper digs at her party's front man on February 20, 2008.

However, in the February 21 Democratic debate at the University of Texas at Austin, the next-to-last one of the campaign, Clinton generally refrained from attacking Obama. Clinton's closing statement in the debate drew praise from political analysts and a standing ovation from the audience. A police officer was killed February 22, 2008, in a motorcycle accident as Clinton's motorcade made its way through downtown Dallas. A visibly angry Clinton lashed out February 22 at Obama over campaign literature that she said he knows is "blatantly false". At the same time, a New York Times report portrayed her as still fighting, but philosophical and realistic about the possibility that she would lose the race. With only a week left in the race a February 26 New York Times report by political correspondent Patrick Healy stated that Clinton had developed a new "kitchen sink strategy" to confronting Obama which involved a slew of negative campaign attacks on Obama's experience and especially his readiness to be commander in chief. This began with a February 25 speech at George Washington University on foreign policy with Clinton comparing Obama's foreign policy inexperience to President George W. Bush.

With a week and a half to go, both Ohio and Texas tightened: An ABC News/Washington Post poll taken February 16–20 indicated that Clinton's lead over Obama in Ohio had shrunk to 7 percentage points. Another poll, released February 25, projected also a statistical dead heat in Texas between the two. On February 25 USA Today/Gallup poll showed that Obama had a double-digit lead for the first time, and a CBS News/New York Times poll showed an even larger Obama lead.

In the last scheduled debate of the campaign, at Cleveland State University on February 26, Clinton and Obama argued with each other over negative campaigning, health care and free trade. Clinton personally echoed a theme her campaign had emphasized over the past days, that media coverage on her was much tougher than that on Obama, by making reference to a Saturday Night Live skit on the same point from the weekend before. New York Times writer Alessandra Stanley said that the debate, hosted by MSNBC and featuring grillings from Tim Russert, "did look a bit like the 'S.N.L.' parody." Hillary Clinton and Barack Obama battled for votes over the airwaves and on the ground in Texas on February 29. Hillary Clinton met her match while appearing on NBC's "Saturday Night Live" to deliver the show's trademark opening line and provide an "editorial response" to a mock presidential debate. On March 2, 2008, Hillary Clinton tried to convince Ohio voters they have what it takes to fix the economy as they campaigned before contests that could decide the Democratic presidential nomination. The state's 3.6 million eligible Hispanic voters could tip the balance in delegate-rich Texas toward Hillary Clinton or Barack Obama. But they're deeply divided. Clinton relied on a loyal grass-roots network of community leaders.

One of the most controversial and upfront moves of the so-called "kitchen sink" strategy against Obama had been an ad entitled "Children", which Clinton aired in Texas concerning a 3 am phone call at the White House during a world crisis and touting Clinton's national security credentials. Many political commentators compared the Clinton ad to one used in the 1984 Democratic primary by Walter Mondale against Gary Hart. Obama responded with a similar ad on the same day claiming that Clinton lacked the judgment to deal with a world crisis because of her vote for the Iraq War. Clinton gave her harshest rebuke of Obama yet on March 3 when she repeatedly stated that she and Senator McCain had foreign policy experience while Obama only had a speech. The Obama campaign responded asking what foreign policy experience Clinton truly had. Hillary Clinton said March 17, 2008, she is the only candidate who would exercise the leadership needed to end the Iraq War. Sen. Barack Obama holds up his original opposition to the war on the campaign trail, but he didn't start working aggressively to end the war.

Clinton broke the 12-state winning streak for Obama with her victory in Rhode Island 58%/40%. The state had Clinton leading in the polls, though her lead had been narrowing in the days leading up to the primary. Clinton also won the Ohio primary 54%/44% and the Texas primary 51%/47%. She lost Vermont 59%/39% and the Texas Caucus 56%/44% with 41% reporting. Overall, Obama secured 99 Texas delegates, while Clinton earned 94. Clinton's wins in Ohio and Texas resulted in large part from her gaining back her core demographic areas of support, such as women and lower-income groups.

The day after, on March 5, Clinton raised the possibility on several morning news programs of a joint ticket with Obama, saying: "That may be where this is headed. But, of course, we have to decide who is on the top of ticket. I think the people of Ohio very clearly said that it should be me." Soon after, in Wyoming, Obama explicitly rejected the notion, saying "You won't see me as a Vice Presidential candidate."

=== Wyoming and Mississippi ===
The Wyoming caucus was held on March 8, 2008, with Senator Obama winning by 61% of the vote compared to Clinton's 38%. President Bill Clinton and daughter Chelsea had campaigned in the state, and Hillary Clinton made a Wyoming appearance the day before the caucuses. The Clinton campaign had continued to criticize Senator Obama's inexperience with what one Clinton aide called the "kitchen sink" strategy – throwing everything at Obama in the days leading up to the March 4 primaries in Ohio and Texas. The Obama campaign was seen as "off balance" by former John Edwards campaign manager Joe Trippi in an interview with New York Magazine because many problems mired the Obama campaign after its Ohio and Texas losses, Trippi expressed concern that Obama's negative counter-attack strategy could backfire. Earlier in the week the campaign of Republican nominee John McCain attacked a gaffe by Obama's foreign policy advisor Susan Rice on MSNBC's "Tucker," wherein she said that neither Obama nor Clinton was "ready to receive that 3 am call," referring to Clinton's Texas attack ad. Obama was also hurt by news that foreign policy advisor Samantha Power had called Clinton a "monster" in an interview with Scottish newspaper The Scotsman. Power subsequently resigned from the campaign. Obama responded to the re-vamped Clinton "kitchen sink" strategy by raising Senator Clinton's reluctance to release her tax returns, with campaign manager David Plouffe calling Clinton "one of the most secretive politicians in America today". Clinton spokesman Howard Wolfson responded to the attacks by comparing Obama to former special prosecutor Kenneth Starr.

The Clinton campaign continued to hint that a Clinton victory would entail Obama being chosen as vice Presidential running mate, and on March 8, former President Bill Clinton made known his support of this as a "dream ticket" which would be an "almost unstoppable force" However, the day before, in Casper, Wyoming, Senator Obama had explicitly rejected this notion. On March 10, Obama noted that he, not Senator Clinton, held the lead in delegates won. "I don't know how somebody who is in second place is offering the vice presidency to somebody who is in first place," he said. He further stated that Clinton's VP suggestion was an example of what he called "the old okey-doke", telling a Columbus, MS crowd that the Clinton camp was trying to "bamboozle" or "hoodwink" voters. Obama inquired why the Clinton campaign believed him competent for vice president, but not as president.

The Mississippi Primary was held on March 11, 2008, with Obama winning 61% of the vote to Clinton's 37%. It was notable that the Mississippi results were largely divided by racial lines with exit polls by CNN showing Obama winning 91% of the black vote while 72% of the white vote went to Clinton.

=== Campaign finance ===
The Clinton campaign had $33 million on hand at the end of February 2008, but due to federal election laws, would only be able to spend $11 million of that on the Democratic primary. As of the end of February, the campaign owed $8.7 million in unpaid debts. The campaign has also been slow paying vendors, drawing criticism from small business owners who have provided services to the campaign.

A February 8, 2008, article in the Portsmouth Herald stated, "Rochester physician Terry Bennett said he rented a city building to people who worked for Sen. Hillary Clinton's presidential campaign – and skipped town without paying the bill. Making matters worse, Bennett said, the 3,000-square-foot (280 m^{2}) building at 236 Union St. was left trashed...Realtor Michael Whitney... said he has been trying to collect rent for four weeks. 'I sent about 20 e-mails,' said Whitney. '...I called, but they will not return any of my calls.'"

A February 23, 2008, article in The New York Times reported that a caterer, a hotel, and a cleaning service all had trouble collecting money from Clinton's campaign for services that they had provided.

A March 31, 2008, article in Politico titled "Clinton didn't pay health insurance bills" stated, "Among the debts reported this month by Hillary Clinton's struggling presidential campaign, the $292,000 in unpaid health insurance premiums for her campaign staff stands out... the unpaid bills to Aetna were at least two months old, according to FEC filings."

After Clinton's April win in the Pennsylvania primary by 9.4%, her campaign released to the media that it had received a renewed national boost, as evidenced by 60,000 donors who contributed a total of $10 million, more than 80 percent of whom the campaign said were first-time donors. An investigation from Politico, however, concluded that the claim was only "successful campaign spin," and "a case of shaping favorable media coverage by crafting a narrative too compelling to overlook." Politico concluded this because the campaign's claims, it said, were "impossible to independently verify." Data released by the Federal Election Commission revealed that the real figure was approximately $4.3 million.

A May 12, 2008, Bloomberg News article states that Clinton has "more than $10 million in unpaid bills to vendors and consultants."

An August 22, 2008, CNN blog entry by CNN reporters Alexander Mooney and Robert Yoon stated, "According to an FEC report filed Wednesday, Clinton's debt as of the end of July stood at just under $24 million – a decrease of only $1.2 million since the end of June. More than $13 million of that total is owed to the New York senator herself, while close to $11 million is owed to individual vendors."

=== NAFTA position ===
During her campaign, Clinton repeatedly criticized the North American Free Trade Agreement, despite it having been one of the major achievements of her husband's administration, and said that as First Lady she had been against the agreement. Her opposition to NAFTA had been a key issue in the Ohio primary.

The mid-March release of Clinton administration White House calendar documents that suggested that Hillary Clinton had participated in several meetings during 1993 to promote NAFTA's passage within Congress led to the Obama campaign accusing her of mendacity. Obama advisor David Axelrod said the documents provided "direct, incontrovertible evidence" that the First Lady worked for NAFTA's passage and that "This is the political equivalent of consumer fraud." The NAFTA matter thus became one of several where Clinton's credibility was being called into question.

Thereupon followed a range of remembrances from Clinton administration officials involved at the time. David Gergen and Robert J. Shapiro said she had opposed NAFTA on the merits, as well as for getting too high political priority compared to the Clinton health care reform plan, an assessment that was echoed by biographers Sally Bedell Smith and Carl Bernstein. Others such as Robert Reich recalled only her opposition to the priority and not to the agreement herself. In any case, once her husband had made the decision to support NAFTA, she did publicly support that.

=== Tax return disclosure ===
On April 4, the Clintons released their tax returns for the past eight years. The total reported income for the time period was $109 million, most of which came from Bill Clinton's books, speaking engagements, and other enterprises. The Clintons paid $34 million in federal taxes over the period.

=== Health insurance story ===
In early April, the Clinton campaign had problems arising from Clinton's use of a story of health insurance coverage, an Ohio hospital, and a patient's death. Based upon a story Clinton had heard from a Meigs County sheriff's deputy in Pomeroy, Ohio, in February, but had not had fact-checked, Clinton described a woman from rural Ohio who was making minimum wage at a local pizza shop, was uninsured, and became pregnant. As told, there were complications with the pregnancy and the woman was denied treatment at a local hospital because she couldn't afford a $100 payment; she later was taken to the hospital by ambulance and lost the baby; she was then taken by helicopter to a Columbus hospital where she died of complications. Clinton used the story through April 4 in Grand Forks, North Dakota. Officials at O'Bleness Memorial Hospital in Athens, Ohio, said the woman did have insurance and had not been turned away; they expressed frustration that Clinton's campaign never called to verify the story, and asked that Clinton stop telling it. In fact, the woman had been earlier denied treatment at a private clinic because she owed them several thousand dollars from unpaid previous visits, and so thought she could not go to the clinic again once she became pregnant, even though she now had insurance. Thus she did not seek medical care until she was already in an emergency situation. On April 6, the Clinton campaign indicated it would drop use of the story. On April 11, Paul Krugman wrote a column in the New York Times saying the essential point about the poor state of health care in the United States was lost in the media storm about this episode and that Clinton's point about a pregnant woman who died after being turned away was essentially correct.

=== Pennsylvania ===
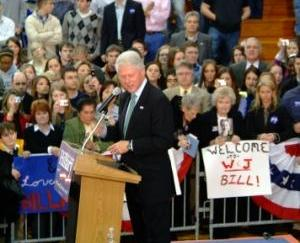
Bill Clinton at a "Solutions for America" rally at the Henry Memorial Center at Washington & Jefferson College on March 11, 2008

Hillary Clinton and Barack Obama would both statistically tie Republican John McCain in a general election matchup, according to a CNN/Opinion Research Corporation poll released March 18, 2008. At the same time, daily tracking polls from Rasmussen Reports showed McCain with a lead over both Democratic candidates. The National Archives on March 19, 2008, released more than 11,000 pages of Sen. Hillary Clinton's schedule when she was first lady. Sen. Barack Obama's campaign has pushed for the documents' release, arguing that their review is necessary to make a full evaluation of Clinton's experience as first lady.

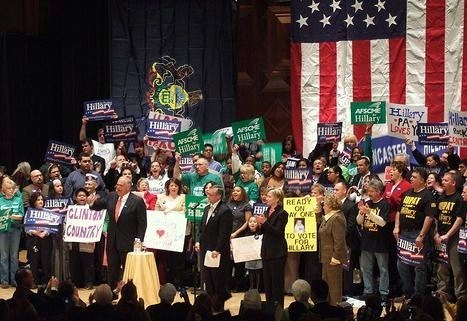
Ed Rendell, Catherine Baker Knoll, and Stephen Reed rally for Clinton in Harrisburg, Pennsylvania, on March 11, 2008

The Pennsylvania Primary will be held on April 22. With 188 delegates, one Pennsylvania newspaper said that the state is "poised to become decisive in the Democratic presidential nomination."

President Bill Clinton highlighted the importance of the state for the Clinton campaign saying on March 11 at an event in Western Pennsylvania that "If she wins a big, big victory in Pennsylvania, I think it'll give her a real big boost going into the next primaries... I think she's got to win a big victory in Pennsylvania. I think if she does, she can be nominated, but it's up to you." This was a repetition of his tactic before March 4, warning supporters that his wife might not be able to continue if she did not win Ohio and Texas. Hillary Clinton emphasized that Pennsylvania was something of a home state for her, as her father came from Scranton, Pennsylvania, she and her brothers were christened there and had vacationed near there each summer, and her brothers still maintained the family cottage near there.

A February 14 Quinnipiac University Polling Institute poll placed Clinton ahead of Obama 52% to 36%. Another poll, released two weeks later, saw that margin decreasing, with Clinton leading Obama by 6 points, at 49% to 43%. As April began, Clinton's lead had been virtually wiped out in the state. A poll from Public Policy Polling had Obama two points ahead, while an Insider Advantage poll showed Clinton hanging on to a two-point advantage. Both results were within the margins of error, making the state a virtual dead heat. Another late-March poll from Quinnipiac University had Clinton nine points ahead.

On March 27, Senator Patrick Leahy of Vermont called for Clinton to withdraw from the presidential campaign and support opponent Barack Obama. The six-term senator, and chair of the Senate Judiciary Committee made the statements during an interview on Vermont Public Radio. Leahy stated: "Senator Clinton has every right, but not a very good reason, to remain a candidate for as long as she wants to. As far as the delegate count and the interests of a Democratic victory in November go, there is not a very good reason for drawing this out." Clinton rejected calls to withdraw, saying "The more people get a chance to vote, the better it is for our democracy...we of all people [know] how important it [is] to give everyone a chance to have their voices heard and their votes counted." Campaigning in the week of April 14, 2008, included a tough debate between Obama and Clinton, who pounded her rival for his recent remark that decades of economic decline had left some rural voters "bitter" and clinging to religion and guns.

On April 22, she won the Pennsylvania primary by 9.2 percentage points, keeping her campaign alive and bringing in a much-needed $4.3 million in new funds over the next 24 hours, although the campaign claimed the figure was $10 million. Weekly churchgoers made up almost 36 percent of the electorate, who went to Clinton by a 56–44 margin. More than a third were gun owners, and they preferred Clinton by an almost-identical margin—60 percent to 40 percent, exit polls found out. The victory showed she had the better shot at winning on November 4, 2008, than he, she stated. A total of 158 delegates to the convention were at stake.

=== North Carolina and Indiana ===
In a series of political ads and speeches while campaigning in Indiana, Clinton blamed the closing and move of Magnequench in Valparaiso, Indiana, a company that manufactures military-grade magnets used in smart weapons on the Bush administration. However, the company's sale to a Chinese company was approved under the administration of her husband Bill Clinton in 1995 despite national security concerns. A memo from the office of Indiana Senator Evan Bayh, who is also a supporter of Clinton, revealed that Bayh blamed the Clintons for the closing of the Magnequench plant.

Clinton was heavily outspent by Obama in both states.

Clinton made her proposal of a summer gas tax holiday a central part of her campaigning. Obama opposed the notion, and it became a major issue between them. When most economists came out against the proposal, Clinton denounced "elite opinion" and said, "I'm not going to put my lot in with economists."

On May 6, a narrow win in the Indiana primary coupled with a large loss in the North Carolina primary, damaged Clinton's campaign's chances and led to speculation about whether she could or would remain in the race. Clinton had hoped to score a solid win in Indiana and finish a close second in North Carolina, especially after Obama had endured a difficult period in his campaign due to continuing effects from the Jeremiah Wright controversy. As the results came in from these two states, ABC political analyst and former top Bill Clinton aide George Stephanopoulos declared the Democratic race "over", and NBC Washington Bureau Chief Tim Russert said, "We now know who the Democratic nominee will be." The day after the North Carolina and Indiana votes, it appeared that superdelegates and party leaders were beginning to coalesce around Obama. He added four superdelegate endorsements to Clinton's one, and former Democratic presidential candidate George McGovern switched his support from Clinton to Obama. Regardless, Clinton vowed that her campaign would continue through the remaining primary states, and she loaned it an additional $6.4 million from her own funds.

=== West Virginia ===
Clinton expressed her rationale for staying in the race by saying, "I have a much broader base to build a winning coalition on ... [there is an Associated Press article] that found how Sen. Obama's support among working, hard-working Americans, white Americans, is weakening again, and how whites in both states who had not completed college were supporting me. There's a pattern emerging here." The bluntness of her demographic analysis garnered some attention, and Clinton aides later said she regretted the remarks. When Congressman Charles Rangel, a strong Clinton supporter, said "that was the dumbest thing she could have said," Clinton acknowledged that "he's probably right."

Campaigning for the coming primaries, the Clinton campaign was forced to economize in its presentation values. While Internet and conventional fundraising continued, it fell far short of the burst she had received after her Pennsylvania win.

Ahead of the West Virginia vote, Obama took the lead in committed superdelegates on May 9. Obama had picked up seven endorsements from superdelegates since the May 6 primaries. Recognizing that the nature of the contest had changed, Clinton largely eliminated mention or criticism of Obama from her stump speeches and advertisements.

Clinton won the state by a 41-percentage-point margin, and told supporters that she was "more determined than ever to carry on in this campaign". After exit polls revealed that large numbers of Clinton supporters were planning to vote for John McCain rather than Obama should she lose the nomination, Clinton said it would be a "terrible mistake" for those voters to do so: "I'm going to work my heart out for whoever our nominee is. Obviously, I'm still hoping to be that nominee, but I'm going to do everything I can to make sure that anyone who supported me ... understands what a grave error it would be not to vote for Sen. Obama."

After winning West Virginia, the Clinton campaign claimed a lead in the popular vote. The math behind this claim required (1) excluding the caucus states of Iowa, Nevada, Maine, and Washington; (2) including the disputed Florida totals; (3) including the disputed Michigan totals; (4) allotting 0 votes to Obama in Michigan. By that calculation, Clinton was ahead by roughly 27,000 votes of 33.4 million cast, or 0.08%. CNN noted that "Four different scenarios of the total popular vote have been kicked around," and that Obama led under all four scenarios. Clinton was ahead only under a fifth scenario excluding caucus states.

=== Kentucky and Oregon ===
Obama continued to add to his superdelegate lead in the week before the May 20 Kentucky and Oregon primaries, and former Democratic candidate John Edwards endorsed Obama on May 14.

On May 20, Clinton won the Kentucky primary by a 35-point margin, while losing the Oregon primary by 18 points. With the results, Obama gained a majority of all the pledged delegates to the convention.

With Obama approaching victory in the nomination process, Clinton continued to avoid attacking him. The campaigns had not yet begun discussing what Clinton might want in any concession negotiation. Bill Clinton began strongly pushing for Obama to take Hillary Clinton as his vice presidential running mate.

=== Florida and Michigan resolution ===
At a meeting of the Democratic National Committee Rules & Bylaws Committee held in Washington, D.C., on May 31, 2008, decisions were made regarding seating delegates from the Michigan primary and Florida primary.

The Florida delegation was seated by following the results of the primary, but with each delegate having one-half vote in consequence of the penalty for holding the primary too early. This gave Clinton 105 pledged delegates (52.5 votes), Obama 67 delegates (33.5 votes), and Edwards 13 delegates (6.5 votes). The Florida resolution was acceptable to all sides and approved by a committee vote of 27 to 0.

The Michigan resolution was less obvious, since only Clinton of the major candidates had been on the ballot. The same half-vote penalty was employed, then a formulation was devised wherein the Michigan delegation was seated with 69 delegates (34.5 votes) pledged to Clinton and 59 delegates (29.5 votes) for Obama. This gave Obama four more delegates than the primary results would have warranted, assuming that all "uncommitted" votes were for Obama. The Michigan resolution was approved by a vote of 19 to 8. Harold M. Ickes, a strong supporter and representative of Clinton, objected strongly to the resolution, saying: "This motion will hijack – hijack – remove four delegates won by Hillary Clinton. This body of 30 individuals has decided that they're going to substitute their judgment for 600,000 voters." He then announced that Clinton reserved the right to appeal the Michigan resolution to the DNC Credentials Committee and thus possibly to the Democratic National Convention.

The meeting was conducted before a boisterous audience of candidate supporters, mostly pro-Clinton.

=== Puerto Rico, South Dakota, Montana ===
The final three primaries took place in early June. The Clinton campaign knew the end was near, but enjoyed the time spent at events in Puerto Rico, and Clinton spoke of the virtue of "finishing the job."

On June 1, Clinton won the Puerto Rico primary by more than a 2-to-1 margin. Later on June 3, Clinton won the South Dakota primary and Obama won the Montana primary. This was the final primary of the season.

=== Obama becomes the presumptive presidential nominee ===
A flurry of superdelegates declared for Obama on June 3, and that combined with the day's winning of new pledged delegates in the two primaries, meant Obama had gained enough delegates to become the presumptive presidential nominee.

Following the result, after rumors fueled by a misunderstanding of an Associated Press report, the campaign dismissed suggestions that Clinton was going to concede in the speech following the primaries. In her speech after the closing of the Montana polls, Clinton said "I will be making no decisions tonight." She invited Americans to write to her on her website to provide input into what her next steps should be.

Meanwhile, while not officially confirming interest in the vice presidential slot, Clinton hinted at the possibility earlier on June 3. When asked for clarification, her campaign released the statement "Today on a conference call with New York legislators, Sen. Clinton was asked whether she was open to the idea of running as vice president and repeated what she has said before: She would do whatever she could to ensure that Democrats take the White House back and defeat John McCain." The vice presidential possibility had been raised by Bill Clinton in the previous month, but this fueled speculation that Hillary Clinton was definitively interested in the possibility.

The New York Times described the relationship between Obama and Clinton during the campaign as having "veered between strained and strange", and suggested that the manner in which Obama reacted to Clinton and her supporters would be a major test of the post-primaries period.

By June 4, several media networks and top Clinton aides confirmed that she had been planning to concede the race for the Democratic nomination and endorse Obama. By June 5, the Clinton camp backed away from any suggestion about the vice presidential slot, with Clinton's spokesperson saying "[she] is not seeking the vice presidency, and no one speaks for her but her. The choice here is Senator Obama's and his alone."

== Controversies ==
=== RFK remark controversy ===
While campaigning in South Dakota on May 23, Clinton responded to questions about why there was pressure on her to leave the race:

... people have been trying to push me out of this ever since Iowa and ... I find it curious because it is unprecedented in history. I don't understand it and between my opponent and his camp and some in the media, there has been this urgency to end this and you know historically that makes no sense, so I find it a bit of a mystery. ... I've been around long enough. You know my husband did not wrap up the nomination in 1992 until he won the California primary somewhere around the middle of June ... We all remember Bobby Kennedy was assassinated in June in California. Um, you know I just I don't understand it. There's lots of speculation about why it is.

Clinton's mention of the 1968 assassination of Robert F. Kennedy in the context of her rationale for staying in the race drew a quick storm of national attention, as well as strong criticism from the Obama campaign. By the end of the day, Clinton issued an apology, saying that the Kennedys were on her mind due to the recent medical condition of Ted Kennedy and that she only used the example because of the June timeline, not, as speculated, to imply an Obama assassination. She had made a similar remark to Time magazine in March.

The following day Obama said he would give Clinton the benefit of the doubt, adding, "I have learned that when you are campaigning for as many months as Senator Clinton and I have been campaigning, sometimes you get careless in terms of the statements that you make. And I think that is what happened here." Throughout the Memorial Day weekend, the Clinton campaign sought to do damage control over the remarks, arguing more strongly that her remarks had been deliberately taken out of context by the news media and the Obama campaign. Campaign spokesperson Howard Wolfson said, "It was unfortunate and unnecessary, and in my opinion, inflammatory, for the Obama campaign to attack Senator Clinton on Friday for these remarks, without obviously knowing the full facts or context."

Clinton was also criticized for exaggerating the meaningful duration of her husband's 1992 campaign; while he did not clinch the nomination until June of that year, he had effectively won it by mid-March.

=== Comments about 1996 Bosnia trip ===
During her presidential campaign, Clinton had made several references to her March 1996 trip to visit U.S. troops enforcing the Dayton Agreement in Bosnia-Herzegovina, detailing a harrowing experience. At a February 29, 2008, event in Waco, Texas, with retired Gen. Wesley Clark and remarks at a December 29, 2007, event in Dubuque, Iowa, Clinton detailed how she had to make a run for it on the tarmac at Tuzla Air Base to avoid sniper fire. On March 17, 2008, during her Saint Patrick's Day speech at The George Washington University, Clinton described her trip to Bosnia:

I certainly do remember that trip to Bosnia... I remember landing under sniper fire. There was supposed to be some kind of a greeting ceremony at the airport, but instead we just ran with our heads down to get into the vehicles to get to our base.

The Associated Press could find no evidence that Clinton had been under extraordinary risk during her landing at Tuzla Air Base. A video of her arrival, released by CBS News, shows Clinton and her daughter Chelsea smiling and waving as they walked at a leisurely pace across the tarmac from a cargo plane, stopping to shake hands with Bosnia's acting president and listen while an 8-year-old girl read a poem. Clinton shook hands with American troops and posed for pictures with a group of 7th graders who were also on the tarmac. Comedian Sinbad, who accompanied Clinton on the trip, said, "I never felt that I was in a dangerous position. I never felt being in a sense of peril, or 'Oh, God, I hope I'm going to be OK when I get out of this helicopter or when I get out of his tank.'" When spokesman Howard Wolfson was asked about her remarks, he said that she "misspoke". CBS News reported that hundreds of thousands of viewers had by then seen video of the 1996 event that offers evidence of Clinton's exaggeration, with Clinton aide Lissa Muscatine saying the event "was not quite as dramatic as Clinton put it." Clinton acknowledged her mistake, saying "I made a mistake. That happens. It proves I'm human, which you know, for some people, is a revelation." The Obama campaign responded by releasing documentation of three other instances in the past in which Clinton had repeated the same sniper fire claim.

=== Ferraro comments and resignation ===
On March 7, 2008, the 1984 Democratic vice-presidential nominee and Clinton finance committee member Geraldine Ferraro, gave an interview to the small California newspaper Daily Breeze in which she said, "I think what America feels about a woman becoming president takes a very secondary place to Obama's campaign – to a kind of campaign that it would be hard for anyone to run against. For one thing, you have the press, which has been uniquely hard on her. It's been a very sexist media. Some just don't like her. The others have gotten caught up in the Obama campaign. If Obama was a white man, he would not be in this position. And if he was a woman (of any color) he would not be in this position. He happens to be very lucky to be who he is. And the country is caught up in the concept." Ferraro justified her statements by referring to her own run for vice president saying that she "was talking about historic candidacies and what I started off by saying (was that) if you go back to 1984 and look at my historic candidacy, which I had just talked about all these things, in 1984 if my name was Gerard Ferraro instead of Geraldine Ferraro, I would have never been chosen as a vice presidential candidate. It had nothing to do with my qualification."

By the day of the March 11 Mississippi primary, the comments had achieved wider circulation and she was accused of being racially insensitive. Hillary Clinton rejected Ferraro's comments – saying, "It is regrettable that any of our supporters on both sides, because we've both had that experience, say things that kind of veer off into the personal. We ought to keep this on the issues" – but did not call for Ferraro's resignation from the Clinton campaign. Ferraro rejected apologizing or repudiating her comments once they came under fire from the Obama campaign, and spoke to the Daily Breeze again, where she said, "I really think they're attacking me because I'm white. How's that?"

On March 12, MSNBC commentator Keith Olbermann launched an unusually vehement critique of the Clinton campaign, accusing the campaign of using Ferraro as a surrogate to imply that Obama (who was president of Harvard Law Review at Harvard Law School during his time there and is a magna cum laude graduate of its law school) was the beneficiary of social and media affirmative action. Some commentators saw these comments by Ferraro as a coded attempt by the campaign to appeal to race-conscious white voters in the upcoming Pennsylvania primary. Later on March 12, Ferraro resigned from the Clinton campaign, saying "The Obama campaign is attacking me to hurt you. I won't let that happen." At a campaign stop with the National Newspaper Publishers Association which represents over 200 African American newspapers, Clinton was asked to apologize for Ferraro's remarks and said, "I said yesterday that I rejected what she said, and I certainly do repudiate it."

== End of campaign ==
On June 7, 2008, in a speech before her gathered supporters at the National Building Museum in Washington, D.C., Clinton officially announced that she was suspending her campaign and was fully endorsing Barack Obama. Clinton said:

The way to continue our fight now – to accomplish the goals for which we stand – is to take our energy, our passion, our strength and do all we can to help elect Barack Obama the next President of the United States. Today, as I suspend my campaign, I congratulate him on the victory he has won and the extraordinary race he has run. I endorse him, and throw my full support behind him. And I ask all of you to join me in working as hard for Barack Obama as you have for me.

Clinton also adopted Obama's signature slogan, "Yes We Can", in her concession speech.

Obama responded to the speech in a number of venues. Shortly after she gave it, Obama stated that he was "thrilled and honored" to be supported by Clinton. In North Carolina on June 9, 2008, Obama began his speech by praising Clinton. He stated:

Before we begin, I just want to take a minute to thank Senator Clinton for the kind and generous support she offered on Saturday [...] She ran an historic race, a historic campaign that shattered barriers on behalf of my daughters and women everywhere who know now that there are no limits to their dreams. What's more, she inspired millions of women and men with her strength, her courage, and her unyielding commitment to the causes that brought us here today – the hopes and aspirations of working Americans. Our party and our country are stronger because of the work that Hillary Rodham Clinton has done throughout her life, and I look forward to working with her ... to make sure we lay out the case for change and set a new course for this country.

Obama also thanked Clinton on his website and asked his supporters to do so as well via a special page designated for that task. In addition, at a rally in Michigan on June 16, Obama defended Clinton as she was being heckled by some members of the audience, stating that "she is worthy of our respect, she is worthy of our honor."

The 2014 book HRC: State Secrets and the Rebirth of Hillary Clinton says that as the campaign wound down, a handful of staffers were tasked with compiling a list of Democrats based on their perceived loyalty or disloyalty during the campaign.

== Delegate count ==
Pledged Delegate margins by state. Obama won the delegate count in the darkest purple states by the largest margins, while Clinton won the delegate count in the darkest green states by the largest margins. They tied in Missouri and New Hampshire. (Compare to popular vote map.)

2008 Democratic presidential primaries delegate count As of June 10, 2008
Candidate	Actual pledged delegates^{1} (3,253 of 3,909 total)	Predicted pledged delegates^{2} (3,409 of 3,909 total)	Estimated superdelegates^{2} (694 of 825 total)	Estimated total delegates^{2} (4,103 of 4,934 total; 2,118 needed to win)
Barack Obama	1,661	1,763	438	2,201
Hillary Clinton	1,592	1,640	256	1,896
John Edwards	–	6	–	6
Color key	1st place Candidate has withdrawn his/her campaign			
Sources:^{1} "Primary Season Election Results". The New York Times. June 26, 2008. Archived from the original on June 26, 2008.^{2} "Election Center 2008 Primaries and Caucuses: Results: Democratic Scorecard". CNN. August 20, 2008.

Popular vote margins by state. Obama won the popular vote in the darkest purple states by the largest margins, while Clinton won the popular vote in the darkest green states by the largest margins.

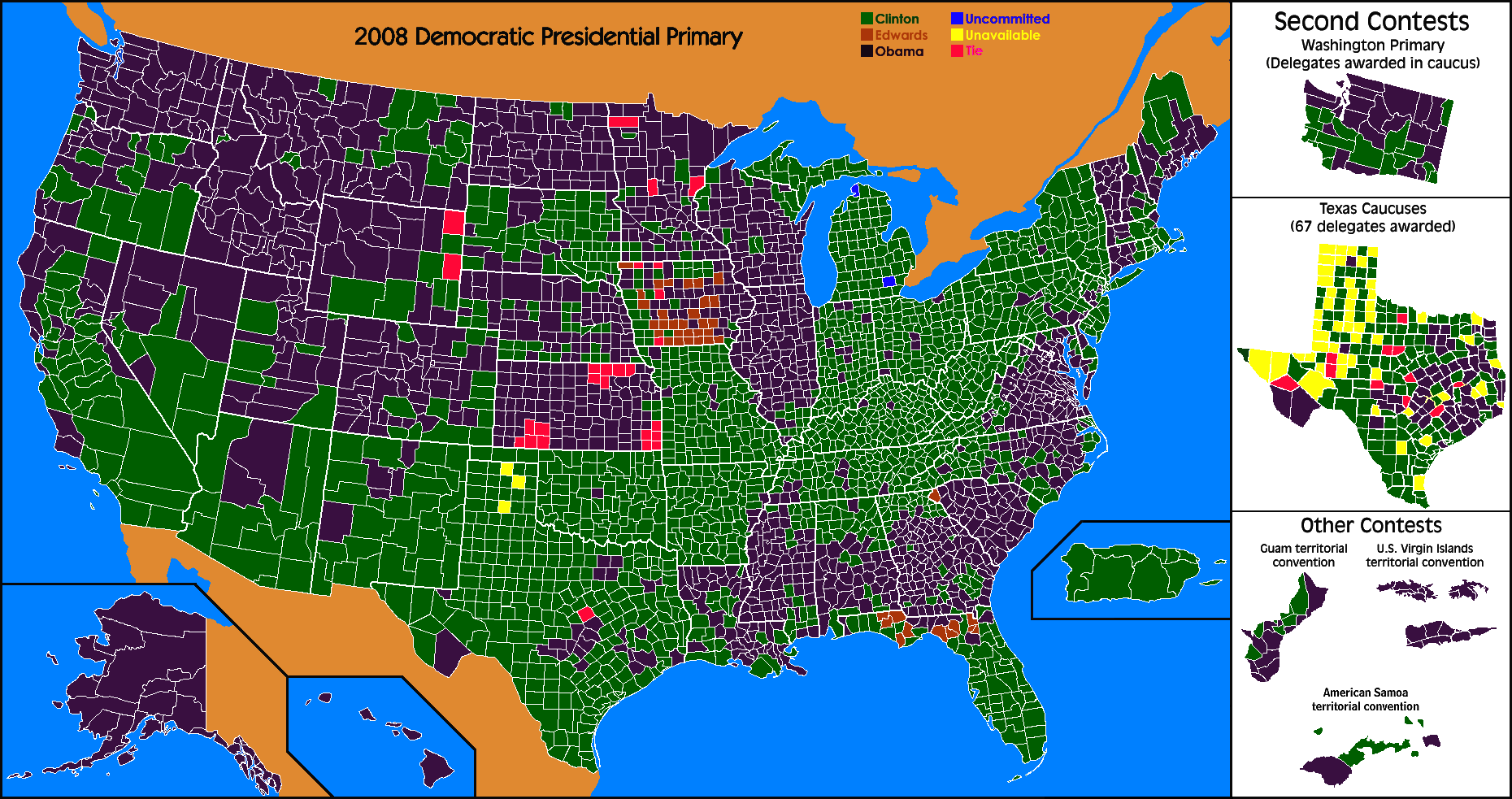
Popular vote margins by county. Obama won the counties colored purple, Clinton won the counties colored green. Edwards won the counties colored orange, and pink counties were a delegate tie. This map includes Florida and Michigan, only half of which count under current party regulations.

== Vice-presidential selection and convention ==
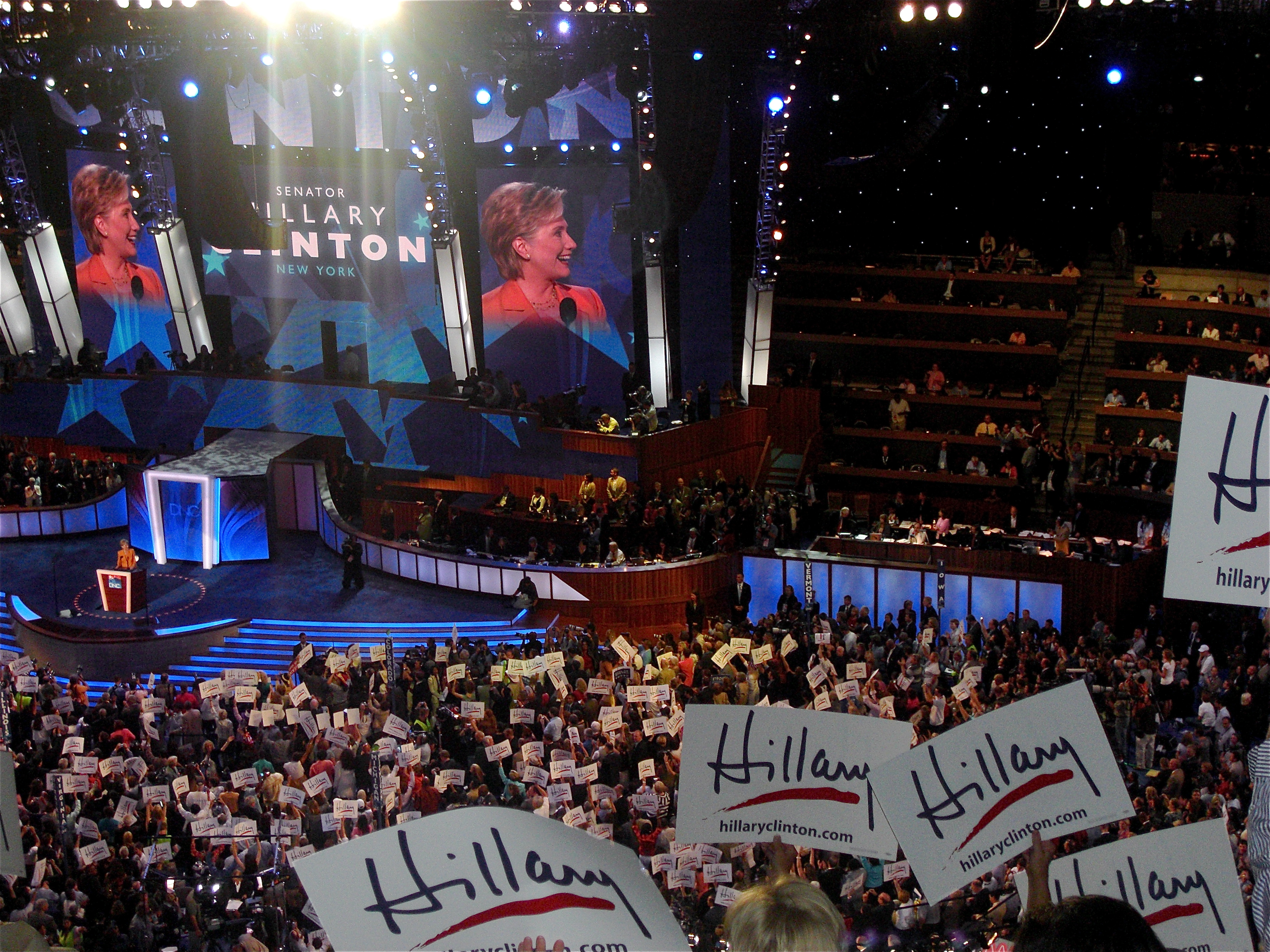
Clinton speaks during the second night of the 2008 Democratic National Convention in Denver, Colorado, while delegates and audience members hold signs reading "Hillary".

After conceding defeat to Obama, Clinton's name was mentioned exhaustively by speculators and party officials as a possible running mate for the Illinois senator; the potential ticket was dubbed "the Dream Team", "the Dream Ticket", and "the Unity Ticket" in some quarters. However, she was never seriously considered or vetted by Obama for the position. Ultimately, Obama selected Delaware Senator Joe Biden over Clinton and a number of other rumored candidates, including Texas Rep. Chet Edwards, Kansas Gov. Kathleen Sebelius, Indiana Sen. Evan Bayh (an early and prominent Clinton supporter), and Virginia Gov. Tim Kaine; the announcement was reported by CNN after midnight (U.S. Eastern Time) on August 22.

During the Democratic National Convention, Clinton released her delegates and urged them to vote for Barack Obama. On August 27, 2008, she motioned that Sen. Obama be officially nominated by acclamation.

== Gender ==
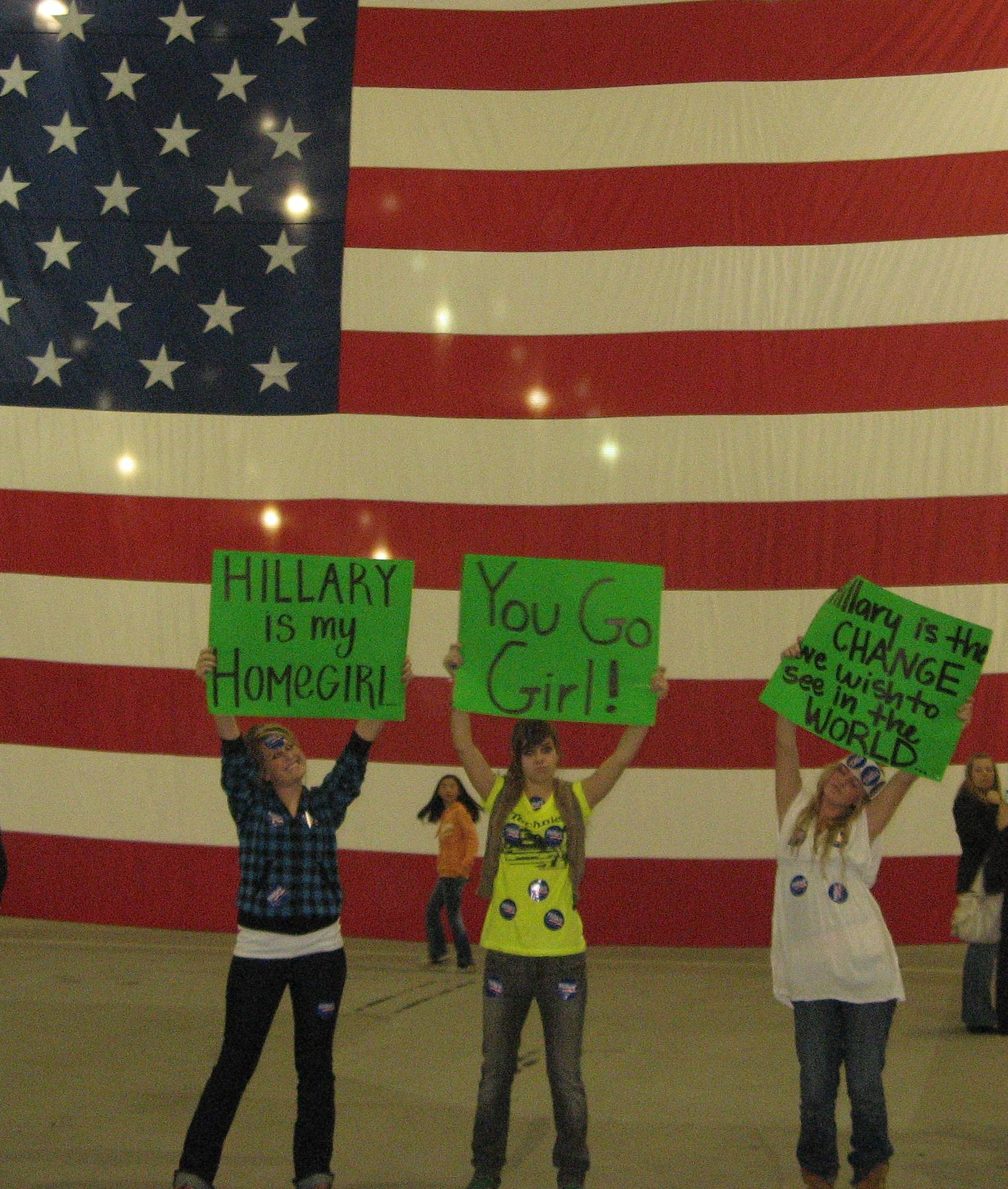
Some of Clinton's Gen Y (millennial) female supporters at a campaign rally. South Hall, San Jose, California, February 1, 2008

Although Clinton was the 25th woman to run for U.S. president, she was the first female candidate to have held a highly probable chance of winning the nomination of a major party, and the presidential election. She was also the first woman to be an American presidential candidate in every primary and caucus in every state. As such, remarks surrounding her gender and appearance came to the fore. In March 2006, actress Sharon Stone expressed her doubt about Clinton's presidential chances, saying "Hillary still has sexual power, and I don't think people will accept that. It's too threatening." On a similar note, on August 9, 2006, the sculpture The Presidential Bust of Hillary Rodham Clinton: The First Woman President of the United States of America was unveiled at the Museum of Sex in New York and attracted attention for its named focus; sculptor Daniel Edwards hoped it would spark discussion about sex, politics and celebrity.

In October 2006, Clinton's then-New York Senate race opponent, John Spencer, was reported to have commented on how much better Clinton looked now compared to in the 1970s, and speculated that she had cosmetic surgery. On the other hand, syndicated radio talk show host Mark Levin never mentioned her name without appending a sneering "Her Thighness" to it.

In her Senate career, Senator Clinton is often seen wearing a suit. However, twice in 2006, Clinton was criticized by National Review Online editor Kathryn Jean Lopez for showing cleavage while speaking in the Senate. Lopez implored Clinton to be more modest. The Washington Post revisited this question based on a new incident in July 2007, which provoked a widespread round of media self-criticism about whether it was a legitimate topic or not; the Clinton campaign then used claimed outrage at the reporting for fundraising purposes.

By the time the campaign was in full force in December 2007, American communications studies professor Kathleen Hall Jamieson observed that there was a large amount of misogyny present about Clinton on the Internet, up to and including Facebook and other sites devoted to depictions reducing Clinton to sexual humiliation. She also said that "We know that there's language to condemn female speech that doesn't exist for male speech. We call women's speech shrill and strident. And Hillary Clinton's laugh was being described as a cackle," making reference to a flurry of media coverage two months prior about the physical nature and political motivation of her aural indication of amusement. Tanya Romaniuk also described how "the news media reshaped the kinds of meanings and values attached to" Clinton's 'cackle' characterization, "and concomitantly (re)produced and reinforced a stereotypically gendered, negative (i.e., sexist, misogynist) perception of her."

Use against Clinton of the "bitch" epithet flourished during the campaign, especially on the Internet but via conventional media as well. Hundreds of YouTube videos carried the word, with such titles as "Hillary Clinton: The Bitch is Back" and "Hillary Clinton: Crazy Bitch", and a Facebook groups with the theme proliferated, including one named "Life's a Bitch, Why Vote for One?" that had more than 1,500 members. Broadcaster Glenn Beck used the term in describing her. In a November 2007 public appearance, John McCain was asked by one of his supporters, "How do we beat the bitch?" (McCain responded by saying, "May I give the translation?" and then went on to say he respected Clinton but could defeat her.) A February 2008 Saturday Night Live monologue by Tina Fey led a backlash-through-embracing movement, when she said "I think what bothers me the most is when people say that Hillary is a bitch. Let me say something about that. Yeah, she is. And so am I.... You know what? Bitches get stuff done.... Get on board. Bitch is the new black!" A new Facebook group "Bitch is the new Black" gained three times the membership of all the anti-Clinton groups named after the word.

Along this theme, PBS commentator Bill Moyers noted that MSNBC commentator Tucker Carlson had said of Clinton, "There's just something about her that feels castrating, overbearing, and scary," and that top-rated radio talk show host Rush Limbaugh continued to refer to her as "the woman with the testicle lockbox." During the campaign, Carlson made repeated statements of the form "When she comes on television, I involuntarily cross my legs." Further discussion ensued when the Drudge Report and a few other media outlets ran an unflattering Associated Press photograph of Clinton looking old and tired on the wintry Iowa campaign trail; Limbaugh sympathized with the plight of American women in an appearance-obsessed culture, then asked, "Will this country want to actually watch a woman get older before their eyes on a daily basis?"

Following her "choked up moment" in New Hampshire and surprise victory there the following day, discussion of gender's role in the campaign moved front and center. Clinton's win in New Hampshire was the first time a woman had ever won a major American party's presidential primary for the purposes of delegate selection. (Shirley Chisholm's prior "win" in New Jersey in 1972 was in a no-delegate-awarding, presidential preference ballot that the major candidates were not listed in and that the only other candidate who was listed had already withdrawn from; the actual delegate selection vote went to George McGovern.) Women following the campaign recalled a series of criticisms of Clinton, such as the pitch of her voice, a debate moderator's question of whether she was "likeable" (and Obama's reply that she was "likeable enough", felt by some to be condescending), and hecklers' demands that she "iron their shirt", as motivations for re-examining who they would support in the contest.

Later in January 2008, Clinton backed out of a cover photo shoot with Vogue over concerns by the Clinton camp that she would appear "too feminine," which prompted the magazine's editor-in-chief, Anna Wintour, to write, "Imagine my amazement, then, when I learned that Hillary Clinton, our only female presidential hopeful, had decided to steer clear of our pages at this point in her campaign for fear of looking too feminine. The notion that a contemporary woman must look mannish in order to be taken seriously as a seeker of power is frankly dismaying. How has our culture come to this? How is it that The Washington Post recoils from the slightest hint of cleavage on a senator? This is America, not Saudi Arabia. It's also 2008: Margaret Thatcher may have looked terrific in a blue power suit, but that was 20 years ago. I do think Americans have moved on from the power-suit mentality, which served as a bridge for a generation of women to reach boardrooms filled with men. Political campaigns that do not recognize this are making a serious misjudgment."

=== Sarah Palin comparison ===
Following the nomination of Sarah Palin for the vice presidency at the Republican National Convention, Palin and Clinton were compared and contrasted with one another in the media, due to their status as women running in the 2008 presidential election. A New York Times article stated, "Mrs. Clinton and Ms. Palin have little in common beyond their breakout performances at the conventions and the soap opera aspects of their family lives. Mrs. Clinton always faces high expectations; Mrs. Palin faced low expectations this week, and benefited from them. Mrs. Clinton can seem harsh when she goes on the attack; Mrs. Palin has shown a knack for attacking without seeming nasty. Mrs. Clinton has a lot of experience; Ms. Palin, not so much. Mrs. Clinton is pantsuits; Mrs. Palin is skirts." Guy Cecil, the former political director of Mrs. Clinton's campaign, said it was "insulting" for Republicans to compare Palin to Clinton. A Saturday Night Live skit, "A Nonpartisan Message From Governor Sarah Palin & Senator Hillary Clinton", counterposed Palin, played by Tina Fey, against Hillary Clinton, played by Amy Poehler. Fey presented Palin as a dimwit unable to understand global politics, as emphasized by the line: "I can see Russia from my house." Former Hewlett-Packard chief executive and McCain advisor Carly Fiorina blasted that one of the Saturday Night Live parodies of Sarah Palin in a television interview: "They were defining Hillary Clinton as very substantive and Sarah Palin as totally superficial," and an ABC News headline soon after ran, "Now the McCain Campaign's Complaining that Saturday Night Live Skit Was 'Sexist'".

"Hillary is missing in action from the Palin-hating brigade", opines a writer at the Weekly Standard. Former Democratic presidential candidate Hillary Clinton referred to Palin's VP nomination as "historic," stating, "We should all be proud of Governor Sarah Palin's historic nomination, and I congratulate her and Senator McCain...While their policies would take America in the wrong direction, Governor Palin will add an important new voice to the debate." Wisconsin Congresswoman Tammy Baldwin expressed a different view: "To the extent that this choice represents an effort to court supporters of Hillary Clinton's historic candidacy, McCain misjudges the reasons so many voters rallied around her candidacy. It was Senator Clinton's experience, skill and commitment to change, especially in the areas of health care and energy policy, that drew such strong support. Sarah Palin's opposition to Roe v. Wade and her support of big oil will not draw Democrats from the Obama-Biden ticket." President of the National Organization for Women (NOW) Kim Gandy said "What McCain does not understand is that women supported Hillary Clinton not just because she was a woman, but because she was a champion on their issues. They will surely not find Sarah Palin to be an advocate for women."

In mid September 2008, a flurry of articles circulated announcing that "Hillary Clinton and Sarah Palin plan to appear next week at the same rally in New York City – perhaps the closest the two history-making women will be to each other before Election Day." However, Clinton pulled out of her scheduled appearance at the rally protesting Iranian President Mahmoud Ahmadinejad when she found out Palin would also be there. "Clinton decided not to attend because she did not want to take part in a "partisan political event"," her aide said. Soon after, organizers of the rally in New York withdrew their invitation to Palin.

== Media coverage ==
An October 29, 2007 study by the Project for Excellence in Journalism and the Joan Shorenstein Center on the Press, Politics and Public Policy found that Clinton had received the most media coverage of any of the 2008 presidential candidates, being the subject of 17 percent of all stories. The study found that 27 percent of the stories had a favorable tone towards her, 38 percent had an unfavorable tone, with the balance neutral.

A November 12, 2007 assessment by Michael Crowley of The New Republic of relations between the Clinton campaign and the press found that regarding published stories, "the Clinton media machine [is] hyper-vigilant [and that] that no detail or editorial spin is too minor to draw a rebuke." The Clinton camp was also reported to engage in retribution regarding stories they did not like, complaining to reporters' editors or withholding access in other areas: "Even seasoned political journalists describe reporting on Hillary as a torturous experience." In spite of this, Crowley measured the press corps as giving Clinton "strikingly positive coverage".

By December 2007, the Clinton campaign charged that Obama's campaign was getting much more favorable media treatment than their own, especially once their campaign began faltering. Washington Post media analyst Howard Kurtz found a number of journalists who agreed with the claim, with Mark Halperin, Time magazine's editor-at-large for political news, saying, "Your typical reporter has a thinly disguised preference that Barack Obama be the nominee. The narrative of him beating her is better than her beating him, in part because she's a Clinton and in part because he's a young African American. ... There's no one rooting for her to come back."

After Clinton's loss in Iowa and in the run-up to her apparent loss in New Hampshire and campaign collapse to come, negative media coverage of her became intense; as Politico phrased it in retrospect, "She is carrying the burden of 16 years of contentious relations between the Clintons and the news media. ... Many journalists rushed with unseemly haste to the narrative about the fall of the Clinton machine. Meanwhile, NBC anchor Brian Williams conceded that at least one NBC reporter said regarding Obama, "it's hard to stay objective covering this guy."

Media Matters singled out MSNBC's Chris Matthews for his consistently harsh coverage of Clinton. During the primaries, and especially after the Iowa caucuses, Matthews was openly enthusiastic about Obama's candidacy. The New Republic reported that Matthews was "swooning" over Obama in the days leading up to the January 8 New Hampshire Democratic primary. On the night of that election, Matthews co-anchored MSNBC's coverage. Air America Radio host Rachel Maddow and political analyst Patrick Buchanan both noted the high turnout among women, and asserted that the media coverage made Clinton a sympathetic figure to female voters. Buchanan stated that the media had "virtually canonized" Obama and behaved as if he'd been "born in Bethlehem." Maddow told Matthews that several blogs were citing him as "a symbol of what the mainstream media has done to Hillary Clinton." She added that sites such as TalkingPointsMemo.com indicated that voters felt that the media were "piling on" Clinton, and were "coming to her defense with their votes." Matthews replied sarcastically, "My influence in American politics looms over the people. I'm overwhelmed myself." He added, "I will never underestimate Hillary Clinton again." The next day, Matthews appeared on Joe Scarborough's MSNBC morning show and said, "I'll be brutal, the reason she's a U.S. senator, the reason she's a candidate for president, the reason she may be a front-runner is her husband messed around. That's how she got to be senator from New York. We keep forgetting it. She didn't win there on her merit." While this incited more controversy, Matthews noted that Clinton's political career started after she appeared with Senator Chuck Schumer and impressed Democratic leaders with her graceful handling of the Clinton–Lewinsky scandal. "I thought it was an unexceptional statement," he said.

In a January 14 New York Times/CBS News poll, 51 percent of Democratic primary voters said the media had been harder on Clinton than on the other candidates (with especially women indicating so), while 12 percent said the media had been harder on Obama. Measurements in late January by the University of Navarra indicated that Clinton and Obama were receiving roughly equal amounts of global media attention, once Obama won the Iowa caucuses.

On February 8, Clinton's Communications Director Howard Wolfson Clinton criticized MSNBC's correspondent David Shuster "for suggesting the Clinton campaign had 'pimped out' 27-year old Chelsea by having her place phone calls to celebrities and Democratic Party 'superdelegates' on her mother's behalf." Shuster apologized "on the air" and was temporarily suspended from the network. Wolfson argued that this was part of "a pattern of tasteless comments by MSNBC anchors about the Clinton campaign" and suggested that Clinton's participation in the scheduled, MSNBC-sponsored Cleveland debate could be jeopardized. The Clinton campaign agreed to continue with the debate after the apology was offered. In a February 12 interview with Chris Plante on WMAL-AM, "former President Bill Clinton implied the media has been unfair to his wife, stated that she was standing up to sexism when she took on NBC, and -- when asked about MSNBC's David Shuster's comments about his daughter, Chelsea -- said there was a double standard." Other critics have also argued that this incident was part of a larger pattern of "sexist coverage."

Clinton got an ironic supporter in conservative radio show host Rush Limbaugh. Limbaugh executed a plan for the listeners of Limbaugh's radio program to vote for Clinton in their states' respective primaries. Limbaugh started his Operation Chaos in order to "politically bloody up Barack Obama". This was known as "Rush the Vote" among the "Drive-by Media", a derogatory term used by Limbaugh when referencing the mainstream media, of which he does not consider himself to be a part.

== See also ==
- List of Hillary Clinton 2008 presidential campaign endorsements
- Political positions of Hillary Clinton
- Hillary Clinton 2016 presidential campaign

=== Opinion polling ===
- Statewide opinion polling for Hillary Clinton for the 2008 United States presidential election
- Statewide opinion polling for the 2008 Democratic Party presidential primaries
- Nationwide opinion polling for the 2008 Democratic Party presidential primaries
- Nationwide opinion polling for the 2008 United States presidential election

== Bibliography ==
- Balz, Dan; Johnson, Haynes (2009). The Battle for America, 2008: The Story of an Extraordinary Election. New York: Viking Penguin. ISBN 978-0-670-02111-6.
- Heilemann, John; Halperin, Mark (2010). Game Change: Obama and the Clintons, McCain and Palin, and the Race of a Lifetime. New York: HarperCollins. ISBN 978-0-06-173363-5.
- Jones, Erik; Vassallo, Salvatore, eds. (2009). The 2008 Presidential Elections: A Story in Four Acts. Palgrave Macmillan. ISBN 978-0-230-61938-8.
- Kornblut, Anne E. (2009). Notes from the Cracked Ceiling: Hillary Clinton, Sarah Palin, and What It Will Take for a Woman to Win. Crown Publishers. ISBN 978-0-307-46425-5.
- Plouffe, David (2009). The Audacity to Win: The Inside Story and Lessons of Barack Obama's Historic Victory. Viking Adult. ISBN 978-0-670-02133-8.
- Sanchez, Leslie (2009). You've Come a Long Way, Maybe: Sarah, Michelle, Hillary, and the Shaping of the New American Woman. Palgrave Macmillan. ISBN 978-0-230-61816-9.
- Thomas, Evan (2009). "A Long Time Coming": The Inspiring, Combative 2008 Campaign and the Historic Election of Barack Obama. New York: PublicAffairs. ISBN 978-1-58648-607-5.
