= The Child (poem) =

- by Rabindranath Tagore
- Written: 1930
- Country: India
- Language: English
- Genre: Poem

"The Child" is an English poem written by Rabindranath Tagore in 1930. It was his only poem originally written in English. Later, he translated it in Bengali as "Sishutirtha". It was one of Tagore's most outstanding poem in his poetic career. It was originally written in a single night.

== Theme ==
The poem deals with the values of spirituality and humanism. It says that the journey of every man depends on his hope, faith and duty.

== Comments and criticisms ==
By the interpretation of Tanusree Sankar, a famous Bengali dancer, the poem is depicted as "a flowing, rhythmic, spiritual journey of Man through the ages, from the bondage of ignorance, ultimately to the freedom of enlightenment and self realization. At the same time, it may also be considered a celebration of the mother – the feminine principle in the universe."
