= Children (advertisement) =

American political advertisement

- Client: Hillary Clinton 2008 presidential campaign
- Running time: 30 seconds
- Release date: February 29, 2008
- Produced by: Roy Spence
- Country: United States

"Children", also referred to as "Ringing Phone" or "3:00AM", was a political advertisement commissioned during the 2008 Democratic Party presidential primaries by Hillary Clinton's campaign. The advertisement aimed to highlight Clinton's national security credentials against those of her primary rival, Barack Obama.

"Children" was aired in Texas days before the state's primary and caucuses were held. The advertisement, which was denounced by Obama's campaign as a scare tactic, has been credited with helping Clinton win the Texas primary.

== Background ==
By late February 2008, Hillary Clinton's presidential primary campaign was in a precarious position; rival Barack Obama had won eleven consecutive primary and caucus contests, and Clinton faced the prospect of effectively losing the Democratic nomination if she failed to carry the state of Texas.

The advertisement, officially titled "Children", was produced with lead media consultant Mandy Grunwald and chief strategist Mark Penn. It ran for approximately 30 seconds and was narrated throughout in voiceover, with no on-screen text identifying Clinton until the closing seconds. The advertisement began airing in Texas on February 29, 2008, though different iterations later aired throughout the country. Penn later recalled writing four or five potential advertisements and presenting them to Clinton, who quickly indicated she preferred the "Children" concept. Penn later stated that the advertisement was intended to depict Clinton as an Iron Lady-like figure, similar to Margaret Thatcher. Though widely viewed as an attack ad, Penn insisted that the advertisement was "positive" because it used "soft images" of sleeping children.

CBS News political consultant Joe Trippi noted its resemblance to a 1984 spot produced for Walter Mondale's campaign against Gary Hart. Advertising executive Roy Spence — who made the original red phone advertisement for Mondale — was also the consultant Clinton had brought into her campaign weeks earlier.

The advertisement opens with footage of the exterior of a Colonial-style home at night, before cutting to interior shots of sleeping children in darkened bedrooms. A narrator states: "It's 3 a.m. and your children are safe and asleep. But there's a phone in the White House and it's ringing. Something is happening in the world. Your vote will decide who answers that call. Whether it's someone who already knows the world's leaders, knows the military, someone tested and ready to lead in a dangerous world. It's 3 a.m. and your children are safe and asleep. Who do you want answering the phone?". The advertisement closes with a brief shot of Clinton picking up a telephone, over the tagline "Hillary Clinton: She's Ready".

== Reception ==
Though the Clinton campaign argued that "Children" was only meant to highlight their candidate's credentials, Politico wrote that the advertisement "implied that Barack Obama wasn't ready to handle an overseas crisis". The Obama campaign responded with a rivaling advertisement noting that Clinton had supported the Iraq War. David Plouffe, an Obama advisor, recalled his campaign being "outraged" by Clinton's advertisement, which they worried would damage Obama in the general election against Republican nominee John McCain.

Describing the advertisement as a "kind of creepy ... don't-push-the-red-button Cold War-esque maneuver", Time labelled "Children" one of the top 10 campaign ads in history. Several analysts noted that the advertisement's framing applied at least as readily to McCain as to Clinton. Writing for The American Prospect, Ezra Klein observed that the advertisement "made more sense as an ad for John McCain". The advertisement is credited with contributing to Clinton's victory in Texas, temporarily slowing Obama's momentum. The Guardian dubbed the advertisement "[t]he most memorable advert" of the election cycle.
