= Children (band) =

American band

CHILDREN is a Los Angeles–based band with five members: Tom Gil, Jeff Steiskal, Mark Yates, Graham Walker, and Trevor Wallace. The group initially began playing together informally in 2013, out of a warehouse practice space in Long Beach, California.

Their early endeavors culminated with the release of their first album, Feel Time, in March 2014. While not garnering much attention outside of the LA area, Feel Time propelled the band into over 40 local performances, and in May 2014, CHILDREN was voted The Deli Magazine – Los Angeles's artist of the month. Music from the Feel Time album was played on the radio in both Atlanta, Georgia and Los Angeles, California.

In October 2014, all five members of the band travelled to a house in Mississippi to record their sophomore album, Great River. Prior to the album's release on April 24, 2015, on Future Force Records, CHILDREN's Great River was featured on Los Angeles music blogs Free Bike Valet and Buzzbands LA. Their song Incantation was played on AM radio in Montreal, Quebec, Canada by the independent music radio show Killer Baby Tomatoes.

Following the April 24, 2015, release of Great River, the album received a favorable review from Girl Underground Music: "In the midst of the revival of 60's psychedelic sounds currently on the music market, it can become difficult breaking away from primarily being thrown under this genre. The bands that are capable of standing out and defining a sound of their own will be the ones to rise above the sea line. Children is one of these bands". Their song Incantation was chosen as the soundtrack to a time-lapse video of Oakland, California artist Jennifer Lugris Park's "Forgiven" series. In May 2015, Great River was featured as one of LAist.com's top 5 albums of the month.
