= Children (short story) =

- Short story by Anton Chekhov
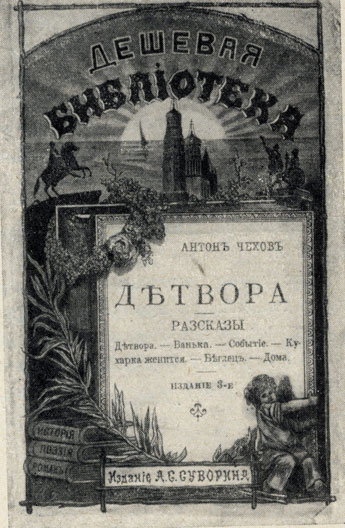
- Cover of the Suvorin-published collection Children (third edition, 1895)
- Original title: Детвора
- Country: Russian Empire
- Language: Russian
- Genre(s): humour, children literature

Publication
- Published in: Peterburgskaya Gazeta (1886)
- Publisher: Adolf Marks (1899)
- Publication date: 20 January 1886

"Children" (Russian: Детвора, romanized: Detvora) is an 1886 short story by Anton Chekhov.

== Plot summary ==
The children, Grisha, Anya, Alyosha, and Sonya, as well as Andrey, the son of a cook, stay up late, taking advantage of the adults' being absent, and play lotto. Quite different things motivate them.

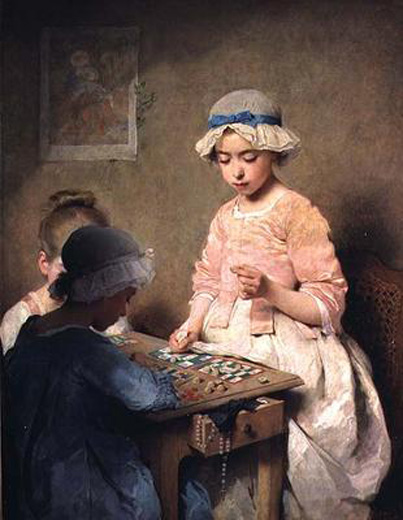
The Game of Lotto, by Charles Joshua Chaplin, 1865

Grisha, a nine-year-old, is the most ardent of the contestants; greedy and highly anxious, he plays only for the money. His younger sister Anya is an equally avid and smart player, but the kopecks hold no interest for her, it is the excitement of the game that she is after. Sonya, aged six, is passionate too, but totally selfless: "whoever wins, she happily laughs and applauds." The youngest one, Alyosha is quite thankful for the very fact that the others do not order him away. Seemingly phlegmatic, he is indifferent to the game as such, but deep inside is quite a sport and gets thrilled with every bit of even the smallest scandal. Andrey, a detached and sickly boy, is indifferent to the financial side of the event. It is the game's "arithmetic and simple philosophy" that leave him entranced and perplexed.

The game, marred with all sorts of incidents, but full of excitement, attract even the oldest brother, Vasya, a teenage gymnasium student, even if a suspicious servant refuses to break his ruble into kopecks. Sonya agrees to lend him one, but then Grisha accidentally drops his coin. After an eventful and, in the long run, successful search, the children return to the table where they find Sonya fast asleep. Altogether, they carry her to their mother's bed... There and then they all fall victim to fatigue. In five minutes' time, all five are upon it, bundled up in a heap, sound asleep, their coins scattered around, "having lost their value, up until the next game."

== Background ==
The idea for the story apparently originated during Chekhov's stay with the family of Colonel B.I. Mayevsky, an artillery battery commander garrisoned in Voskresensk. According to Mikhail Chekhov, "[Mayevsky] had charming children, Anya, Sonya and Alyosha, whom my brother Anton Pavlovich befriended and later portrayed in the short story 'Children'."

== Publication history ==
The story was published for the first time on 20 January 1886 by Peterburgskaya Gazeta (No. 19), subtitled "The Scene" and signed A. Chekhonte (А. Чехонте). It featured in the 1886 Motley Stories (Пёстрые рассказы) collection and later in the Children (Детвора) collection, published by Aleksey Suvorin in 1889, and re-issued twice in early 1890s. Chekhov included the story into the Volume 3 of his Collected Works, published by Adolf Marks in 1899-1901. During its author's lifetime, the story was translated into Bulgarian, Hungarian, Danish, German, Polish, Romanian, Serbo-Croatian and Czech languages.

== Critical reception ==
The story received a positive feedback from a number of critics. In Russkoye Bogatstvo, Leonid Obolensky wrote: "Children and a child's soul pictured by Chekhov, are amazing." Viktor Goltsev, in his 1894 Russkaya Mysl-published essay, noted that in the "Children", "features of children's characters are neatly traced." Mentioning "Children" alongside "Agafya", "The Witch" and "The Requiem", Konstantin Arsenyev in Vestnik Evropy wrote, "With the children's characters... Chekhov is quite at home."

Leo Tolstoy included "Children" into the list of his favourite stories by Chekhov.
