= Teenager (Fujifabric album) =

Studio album by Fujifabric
- Released: January 23, 2008
- Genre: Alternative rock, Power pop
- Length: 56:34
- Label: Capitol

Fujifabric chronology
Fab Fox (2005)	Teenager (2008)	Chronicle (2009)

Teenager is the third studio album by Fujifabric, released on January 23, 2008, on the Capitol Records label. The majority of the songs featured on the album are written by Masahiko Shimura, with the exception of "Kinen Shashin", "B.O.I.P." ("Battle of Inokashira Park") and "Mabataki", which are written by guitarist Sōichirō Yamauchi. The song "Chocolate Panic" is co-written by Roger Joseph Manning Jr. who is also featured on the track. "Hoshifuru Yoru ni Nattara" is co-written by keyboard player Daisuke Kanazawa.

== Track listing ==
1. "Pedal" (ペダル, Pedaru)
2. "Kinen Shashin" (記念写真)
3. "B.O.I.P."
4. "Wakamono no Subete" (若者のすべて)
5. "Chocolate Panic"
6. "Strawberry Shortcakes"
7. "Surfer King"
8. "Romane" (ロマネ)
9. "Passion Fruit" (パッション・フルーツ, Passhon Furūtsu)
10. "Tōkyō Enjō" (東京炎上) (Album Mix)
11. "Mabataki" (まばたき)
12. "Hoshifuru Yoru ni Nattara" (星降る夜になったら)
13. "Teenager"

== Chart positions ==
Chart (2008)	Peak position
Japan Oricon	11
