= Teen (disambiguation) =

A teen or teenager is a person between the ages of 13 and 19.

Teen is the suffix used to form the name of the numerals of numbers 13 to 19.

Teen or teens may also refer to:

- Teen (word), the word used to different people ages 13 to 19
- Teen (magazine), an American lifestyle magazine targeted at teens
- Alfred "Teen" Blackburn (1842–1951), American Confederate Civil War veteran
- ESRB Teen Rating
- TEEN (band), an American musical band from Brooklyn
- Te3n, a 2016 Indian film, stylization of Teen
- Teen Bayka Fajiti Aika, a 2012 Indian Marathi-language film

== See also ==
- Teen language (disambiguation) (incl. Téén, Thiin)
- Teen magazine, a genre of magazine targeted at youth
- Teen drama, a genre of television that centers on teenage characters
- Teen film, a genre of films targeted at youth
- Teen idol, a person seen as an idol by teenagers
- Teenager (disambiguation), same meaning
- Tens (disambiguation)
