= Boruto: Naruto Next Generations episodes 53–104 =

- Series 2
- Cover of the fourth home media box set release of the series featuring Boruto Uzumaki and Naruto Uzumaki.
- No. of episodes: 52

Release
- Original network: TV Tokyo
- Original release: April 11, 2018 – April 28, 2019

Series chronology
- ← Previous; List 1 (#1–52) Next → List 3 (#105–156)

Boruto: Naruto Next Generations is a Japanese anime series based on the manga series of the same name and is a spin-off and sequel to Masashi Kishimoto's Naruto. It is produced by Pierrot and broadcast on TV Tokyo. The anime is directed by Noriyuki Abe (#1–104 (Note: Chief Director)), Hiroyuki Yamashita (#1–66), and Toshirō Fujii (#67–104) and written by Makoto Uezu (#1–66) and Masaya Honda (#67–). Former manga writer Ukyō Kodachi supervised the story until episode 216.

Boruto follows the exploits of Naruto Uzumaki's son Boruto and his comrades from the Hidden Leaf Village's ninja academy as they seek their path in life. Despite being based on the manga, the anime also explores original storylines and the Naruto Shinden light novel series.

It premiered on TV Tokyo on April 5, 2017, and aired every Wednesday at 5:55 PM JST. Beginning May 3, 2018 (episode 56), it moved to Thursdays at 7:25 PM JST. From October 7, 2018 (episode 76) it aired on Sundays at 5:30 PM JST. The series is also released on DVD. Viz Media licensed the series on March 23, 2017, for simulcast streaming on Hulu, on Crunchyroll.

The opening theme songs are "It's All in the Game" by Qyoto (episodes 52–75), "Lonely Go!" by Brian the Sun (episodes 76–100), and "Golden Time" by Fujifabric (episodes 101–126). The ending theme songs are "Kachō Fūgetsu" by Coalamode (episodes 52–63), "Laika" by Bird Bear Hare and Fish (episodes 64–75), "Polaris" by Hitorie (episodes 76–87), "Tsuyogari Loser" by Real (episodes 88–100), "Ride or Die" by Skypeace (episodes 101–113).

== Episode list ==
No.	Title (Note: All English titles are taken from Crunchyroll.)	Directed by	Written by	Original release date
53	"Himawari's Birthday"; Transliteration: "Himawari no tanjōbi" (Japanese: ヒマワリの誕生日)	Taiki Nishimura	Makoto Uezu	April 11, 2018
A mysterious figure named Urashiki suddenly appears on the moon to confront Toneri. Urashiki claims that he is a member of the main family of the Otsutsuki clan, who have been watching him and his actions for many years, and claims that he has betrayed their clan by doing something to Boruto's eyes. Toneri charges towards him, but Urashiki restrains him before freezing him using a special justu, in order to prevent him from interfering again. Meanwhile, Boruto feels powerless for not being able to defeat the White Zetsu on his own in contrast to his teammates as well as other ninja teams seeking to participate in Chunnin Exams. Sarada convinces Boruto to participate in them in order to show off the Hokage how much he grew across his missions. As this happens, the Uzumaki family celebrates Himawari's birthday, but Boruto is very disappointed to find out that Naruto used a Shadow Clone instead of being directly present for the celebration. Sasuke then returns to the Hidden Leaf Village, seeking to talk to Naruto.
54	"Sasuke and Boruto"; Transliteration: "Sasuke to Boruto" (Japanese: サスケとボルト)	Yūsuke Onoda	Makoto Uezu	April 18, 2018
Sasuke informs Naruto and Shikamaru about his encounter with Kinshiki in Kaguya's dimension and his escape with a scroll about Kaguya that needs to be deciphered. As Sasuke leaves, he is confronted by Boruto, who is amazed by Sasuke's skills and requests him to be his teacher. Sasuke agrees, but with the condition that he must first learn the Rasengan, a jutsu created by Naruto's father and Boruto's grandfather, the Fourth Hokage Minato Namikaze. As Sasuke returns to his family, Boruto goes to Konohamaru to learn the Rasengan. After days of training, Boruto creates a miniature version of the Rasengan but requests Katasuke to use his invention to replicate the normal technique. Although Sasuke realizes Boruto is using technology, he accepts Boruto as his student.
55	"The Scientific Ninja Tool"; Transliteration: "Kagaku ningu" (Japanese: 科学忍具)	Hodaka Kuramoto	Hideto Tanaka	April 25, 2018
Sasuke starts training Boruto while telling him of his father's past following a discussion he had with Konohamaru about the issues between them. Iwabe, Sumire and the others also decide to take the Chunin Exam and turn in their applications. The Fifth Kazekage Gaara arrives from the Hidden Sand with three of his village's gennin who aim to take the exams while Boruto decides to cheat through it with Katasuke. Meanwhile, after Urashiki Otsutsuki reports his findings of the planet that Kaguya settled on, Momoshiki begins targeting the Tailed Beasts with Gyuki the Eight-Tails Jinchuriki Killer Bee attacked by the Otsutsuki Clansmen.
56	"Rivals, Gather!"; Transliteration: "Raibaru, shūketsu!!" (Japanese: ライバル、集結!!)	Takeru Ogiwara	Kōjiro Nakamura	May 3, 2018
The Chunin Exams are about to begin and genin from the other villages arrive in droves. The Hidden Sand's hopefuls include the Kazekage's adopted son Shinki, and his team mates Yodo and Araya. The Hidden Mists send the Senka triplets, the Hidden Cloud sends Yurui, Iroi, and Tarui. And finally, the Hidden Rock send the Genbu Three. As formidable rivals arrive on the scene, tensions run high as every participant sizes each other up, and prepare for the first round of the Chunin Exams.
57	"The Reason I Can't Lose"; Transliteration: "Make rarenai riyū" (Japanese: 負けられない理由)	Yūichirō Aoki	Touko Machida	May 10, 2018
Urashiki attacks Gaara as the Kazekage retained chakra traces of Shukaku the One-Tail from his time as the Tailed Beast's Jinchuriki, Sasuke thinking it would be best to postpone the Exam despite the Kages' insistence. Round two of the Chunin Exams begins then. For the second test, three-man teams must try to capture their rival team's flags. Sarada and Mitsuki set out for enemy territory while Boruto stays behind to guard their flag. The Senka Triplets from the Hidden Mist attack, and Boruto finds himself in trouble. Boruto considers using the Scientific Ninja Tool that Katasuke gave him which allows him to defeat his enemy. After learning from Shikamaru that Boruto's team passed, Naruto goes to congratulate his son and wishes him success in the next round.
58	"The Tournament Begins!"; Transliteration: "Tōnamento, kaishi!!" (Japanese: トーナメント、開始!!)	Hideaki Ōba	Masaya Honda	May 17, 2018
The third round of the exams begins, consisting of individual battles held tournament style. Boruto's first match is against Yurui of the Hidden Cloud, and Shikadai is matched up against Yodo of the Hidden Sand. While Boruto easily defeats Yurui with a Ninja Tool, Shikadai makes Yodo give up. Sarada easily defeats Tarui of the Hidden Cloud while Inojin is defeated by Araya of the Hidden Sand. Mitsuki then wins his own fight by attacking his own enemy. Cho-Cho then begins her fight against Shinki.
59	"Boruto vs. Shikadai"; Transliteration: "Boruto bāsasu Shikadai" (Japanese: ボルトVS(バーサス)シカダイ)	Kaito Asakura	Masaya Honda	May 24, 2018
The match between Cho-Cho and Shinki of the Hidden Sand begins. Confronted by a foe who is unbelievably calm and menacing, Cho-Cho shows a rarely serious side to herself as her teammates watch and cheer her on. Boruto and Shikadai's match is next, and the moment nears when the two friends will face off against each other for the first time.
60	"The Hidden Leaf vs. The Hidden Sand"; Transliteration: "Konohagakure bāsasu Sunagakure" (Japanese: 木ノ葉隠れVS(バーサス)砂隠れ)	Taiki Nishimura	Masahiro Ōkubo	May 31, 2018
The tournament nears its finale with the matches of Sarada and Mitsuki each having their match against their respective Hidden Sand opponents Araya and Shinki. Sarada uses her shuriken and Sharingan skills to attack Araya relentlessly, but he counters her with total ease. Her genjutsu has no effect and she is backed into a corner. In Mitsuki and Shinki's match, the evenly matched duo puts on a show of skills.
61	"The Iron Sand User: Shinki"; Transliteration: "Satetsu tsukai, Shinki" (Japanese: 砂鉄使い・シンキ)	Takeru Ogiwara	Kō Shigenobu	June 7, 2018
The final battle of the tournament begins with Boruto, Sarada and Shinki participating in a battle royale. As the lone representative remaining from the Hidden Sand, Shinki is driven by pride as he goes on the offensive against Boruto and Sarada. Boruto and Sarada team up to fight Shinki, but he puts up an impenetrable defense. Sarada falls, and Boruto's chakra is nearly exhausted, but he refuses to give up. He relies on the Kote and unleashes Purple Lightning, which many questioned when he learned the jutsu. Though Boruto wins the match, Naruto disqualifies him for using the Kote, Boruto then tells him they never talk and if Naruto did talk to him before he would never have done this. Katasuke interferes by advertising the device and also concluding that Boruto is the tester. Then suddenly, Momoshiki and Kinshiki arrive at the arena.
62	"The Otsutsuki Invasion"; Transliteration: "Ōtsutsuki, Shūrai!!" (Japanese: 大筒木、襲来!!)	Yūsuke Onoda	Kiyomune Miwa	June 14, 2018
Making themselves known by appearing in the arena, Momoshiki targets Naruto, with Boruto's Scientific Ninja Tool useless against him, while Kinshiki battles Sasuke when the Otsutsuki makes an attempt on Sarada. Meanwhile, a curious Urashiki targets Mitsuki before being driven off by Gaara and Chojuro. Naruto and the other ninja do all they can to protect the citizens. Ultimately, Naruto requests Sasuke to protect the children as he and Kurama the Nine-Tails tries to stop Momoshiki's jutsu targeting the area. Boruto experiences his father's memories through his chakra and cries out as the blast reaches them.
63	"Sasuke's Secret Weapon"; Transliteration: "Sasuke no kirifuda" (Japanese: サスケの切り札)	Yoshinori Odaka	Tōko Machida	June 28, 2018
Boruto wakes up in the hospital to find out that Naruto had taken Momoshiki's attack head on to protect everyone, after which he collapsed and was taken away. Boruto finally realizes the depth of Naruto's love for the village and its people, and that he was pushing himself so hard this whole time for their sakes, which is why he was not able to come home very often. Boruto then blames himself for being too stubborn to realize that sooner. However, Sasuke then tells him that this was exactly what Naruto went through when he was a kid, only that he did not have any family to rely on the way Boruto does. The two of them and the other 4 Kage then set out to save Naruto and battle the Otsutsuki.
64	"Rescuing Naruto!"; Transliteration: "Naruto, dakkan!!" (Japanese: ナルト、奪還!!)	Masayuki Matsumoto	Hideto Tanaka	July 5, 2018
Naruto realise he drove Boruto to cheat and did not even acknownledge him; he really did not try to understand Boruto at all. Boruto and the rescue team then arrives, Sasuke and the Kage wage an intense battle against the powerful Momoshiki and Kinshiki. Boruto and Naruto, who have always been at odds, finally connect for the first time, Naruto apologies to Boruto for everything up until now, by trying to protect him and everyone in the village; Naruto ended up ignoring his family instead of lack of time. When Sasuke is about to kill Kinshiki, Momoshiki absorbs him.
65	"Father and Child"; Transliteration: "Chichi to ko" (Japanese: 父と子)	Chengxi Huang	Makoto Uezu	July 19, 2018
Naruto, Sasuke and the four other Kage fight against Momoshiki Otsutsuki. Although most of them are defeated, Naruto and Sasuke manage to team up and defeat Momoshiki. Before Momoshiki's death, he is accidentally helped by Katasuke and his Scientific Ninja Tool to recover his chakra. As Naruto is weakened, he passes his energy to Boruto to create a Massive Rasengan, putting an end to Momoshiki's life. While dying, Momoshiki talks to Boruto and gives him a mysterious seal, Karma.
66	"My Story!"; Transliteration: "Ore no monogatari...!!" (Japanese: オレの物語…!!)	Takeru Ogiwara Yūta Suzuki	Masahiro Ōkubo	July 26, 2018
Boruto has made his rounds apologizing to everyone for his transgressions during the exam, but Momoshiki's prophecy continues to bother him.
67	"Super Cho-Cho Butterfly Mode!"; Transliteration: "Chō Chōchō chō mōdo!!" (Japanese: 超チョウチョウ蝶モード!!)	Yūjirō Abe	Masaya Honda	August 2, 2018
Popular actors Tomaru and Ashina receive death threats from an unknown person, so Team 10 is assigned to a joint mission with Team 7 to guard them. The two teams assemble to get the details of their mission, but Boruto sees a beautiful girl he doesn't remember seeing before.
68	"Super Cho-Cho Kiss Mode!"; Transliteration: "Chō Chōchō kisu mōdo!!" (Japanese: 超チョウチョウキスモード!!)	Taiki Nishimura	Atsushi Nishiyama	August 9, 2018
The movie studio where Team 7 and Team 10 have been assigned to is attacked by a mysterious ninja. The lead actress is wounded and Tomaru, the lead actor, picks Cho-Cho to be the stand-in! Tomaru's flirting has Cho-Cho on Cloud 9, but Sarada and the others worry that the lovestruck Cho-Cho has lost her focus on the mission.
69	"Super Cho-Cho Love Upheaval!"; Transliteration: "Chō Chōchō koi sōdō!!" (Japanese: 超チョウチョウ恋騒動!!)	Kaito Asakura	Masaya Honda	August 16, 2018
The ninja in the gas mask appears again during filming and kidnaps Tomaru. Despite everything that happened, Cho-Cho continues to worry about Tomaru and berates Konohamaru and Moegi for failing to stop the abductor. Meanwhile, Ashina agrees to deliver the money as instructed in the ransom note.
70	"The Other Side of Anxiety"; Transliteration: "Kinchō no mukō-gawa" (Japanese: 緊張の向こう側)	Yōko Kanamori	Hideto Tanaka	August 23, 2018
Metal's father, Rock Lee, announces that he will train Metal to master the ultimate taijutsu technique, the Eight Inner Gates. The thought that he cannot fail this training fills Metal with anxiety, and he ends up buying an item that's supposed to calm his nerves. But it doesn't work, and his father ends up postponing the training. He then runs into Might Guy, his father's mentor and a hero of the Fourth Great Ninja War.
71	"The Hardest Rock in the World"; Transliteration: "Sekai de ichiban katai ishi" (Japanese: 世界で一番固い石)	Yūsuke Onoda	Masaya Honda	August 30, 2018
The first Five Kage Summit since the attack by the Otsutsuki Clan is held in Hidden Leaf. The current Kage as well as their predecessors assemble, except the Third Tsuchikage, Ohnoki. Boruto and Team 7 have been assigned security duty, but Boruto gets bored and lets his guard down. Then by chance, they encounter Ohnoki.
72	"Mitsuki's Will"; Transliteration: "Mitsuki no ishi" (Japanese: ミツキの意志)	Takeru Ogiwara Yūta Suzuki	Atsushi Nishiyama	September 6, 2018
The ninja assigned to the Hidden Leaf Gate are attacked, and Mitsuki disappears. Boruto and Sarada are unaware of this when their scheduled mission is suddenly canceled. Worried, the two start searching for their teammate. When they learn that all the jonin have been summoned by the Hokage, they set out to find out what's going on.
73	"The Other Side of the Moon"; Transliteration: "Tsuki no uragawa" (Japanese: 月の裏側)	Masayuki Matsumoto	Tōko Machida	September 13, 2018
Boruto and Sarada sneak out of the village and head to Orochimaru's research lab to find clues about Mitsuki. After evading the ninja guarding the entrance, they get in. But what they observe at the facility and hear from Orochimaru makes Boruto realize that he never truly knew Mitsuki. Meanwhile, the village finds out that Boruto and Sarada have gone in search of Mitsuki, and Shikadai and his Team 10 are assigned a tracking mission to bring them back.
74	"The Enemy, Ino-Shika-Cho!"; Transliteration: "Teki wa Ino–Shika–Chō...!!" (Japanese: 敵は猪鹿蝶…!!)	Yūichirō Aoki	Kō Shigenobu	September 20, 2018
Orochimaru tells Boruto and Sarada about the White Snake Sage who lives in Ryuchi Cave. On their way there, the two are confronted by Team 10, which is determined to take the two back to the village so that they are not labeled as "rogue" ninja. But there's no way Boruto or Sarada will oblige until they find out the truth from Mitsuki, so they are forced into confrontation using everything they've got.
75	"The Trials of Ryuchi Cave"; Transliteration: "Ryūchidō no shiren" (Japanese: 龍地洞の試練)	Ayumu Ono	Masahiro Ōkubo	September 20, 2018 (Note: Episodes 74 and 75 aired together as an hour long special at 6:55 PM JST, 30 minutes before the original air time.)
Boruto and friends head for Ryuchi Cave in order to see the White Snake Sage. But it is not a simple task, since they have no clue where it is. They search for miles, becoming hungry and tired. They are near their limit when Ryuchi Cave suddenly appears before them along with mysterious women to guide them. They are told they must pass a series of tests in order to meet the White Snake Sage.
76	"Incurring Wrath"; Transliteration: "Gekirin ni furero" (Japanese: 逆鱗に触れろ)	Norihiko Nagahama	Hideto Tanaka	October 7, 2018
The White Snake Sage tells Boruto to bring back the "Reverse Scale" from Garaga, a troublesome snake. Boruto and his friends head deeper into Ryuchi Cave and are confronted by a giant serpent. It is Garaga, the very one they seek, but its sheer power has the gang backed into a corner. Meanwhile, Moegi reports that Mitsuki's disappearance might involve someone who has access to crucial village secrets.
77	"A Fierce Enemy: Garaga's Ferocious Attack!"; Transliteration: "Kyōteki, Garaga no mōkō!!" (Japanese: 強敵、ガラガの猛攻!!)	Yūjirō Abe	Atsushi Nishiyama	October 14, 2018
Boruto and the others work together to obtain the Reverse Scale from Garaga. But the battle proves difficult, as Garaga has the power to sense the location of its enemies and turn them into stone. In the midst of battle, the team notices inconsistencies in Garaga's moves and comes up with a successful strategy to subdue him. Boruto is seized with a strange feeling and makes Garaga a proposition.
78	"Everyone's Motives"; Transliteration: "Sorezore no omowaku" (Japanese: それぞれの思惑)	Taiki Nishimura	Tōko Machida	October 21, 2018
Mitsuki heads toward Kokuyou and Sekiei's homeland, the Land of Earth. Meanwhile, thanks to the power of the White Snake Sage, Boruto and the others learn that Mitsuki is with Hidden Stone Ninja, and they also head for the Land of Earth. Each side has their own agenda, but will they be able to meet up successfully.
79	"Reunion with Mitsuki"; Transliteration: "Saikai, Mitsuki…!!" (Japanese: 再会、ミツキ…!!)	Takeru Ogiwara	Kō Shigenobu	October 28, 2018
Kokuyou confronts Boruto and the others. Kokuyou, whose only goal is to become strong, is so powerful that he's taken down the Leaf ninja pursuing Mitsuki. He easily drives Boruto and his team into a corner. Just then, backup appears. Boruto and his friends manage to overcome Kokuyou, and finally catch up with Mitsuki.
80	"Mitsuki's Friend"; Transliteration: "Mitsuki no tomodachi" (Japanese: ミツキのトモダチ)	Yūsuke Onoda	Masaya Honda	November 4, 2018
Instead of returning home with Boruto, Mitsuki stays with Kokuyou. During this time, Sekiei becomes sick and declines. To recover, Kokuyou returns to his comrades. During his absence, Sekiei asks Mitsuki to teach him what it means to be human. Meanwhile, the Fourth Tsuchikage Kurotsuchi, who had been visiting Ohnoki, her ailing grandfather, is attacked by mysterious assailants.
81	"Boruto's Wish"; Transliteration: "Boruto no negai" (Japanese: ボルトの願い)	Kaito Asakura	Atsushi Nishiyama	November 11, 2018
Boruto is injured, unconscious and unable to continue. Everyone thinks about returning to the Hidden Leaf. However, being close to the Land of Earth, a surprise attack is highly possible. As a precaution, Inojin and Cho-Cho set out on recon of the surrounding area.
82	"Infiltrating the Hidden Stone Village"; Transliteration: "Sen'nyū!! Iwagakure no sato" (Japanese: 潜入!! 岩隠れの里)	Masayuki Matsumoto	Hideto Tanaka	November 18, 2018
Boruto and his friends decide to go the Hidden Stone Village to see the former Tsuchikage, Ohnoki. In case of an emergency, Inojin stays back with the young Akuta, who is attached to him. The team secretly enters the village determined to find Ohnoki, but they are unaware that they are being watched.
83	"Ohnoki's Justice"; Transliteration: "Ōnoki no seigi" (Japanese: オオノキの正義)	Yūta Suzuki Yūichirō Aoki	Tōko Machida	November 25, 2018
The team finds Ohnoki, but he flatly refuses to help. On top of which, they are attacked and separated. This leaves it up to each member to make it to the rendezvous point on their own. Meanwhile, Mitsuki is being shown around Kokuyou's hideout.
84	"Ohnoki's Thoughts, Ku's Thoughts"; Transliteration: "Ōnoki no omoi, Kū no omoi" (Japanese: オオノキの思い、空の思い)	Yūjirō Abe	Masahiro Ōkubo	December 2, 2018
Boruto and Ohnoki head to the rendezvous point, but they stumble into the Hidden Stone Shinobi Training Grounds, which are protected by a barrier. Ohnoki tells Boruto that the only way out of the Training Grounds is to find his heart of stone, something that can only be found once in a lifetime when a person comes to terms with their will.
85	"The Heart Stone"; Transliteration: "Kokoro no ishi" (Japanese: 心の石)	Norihiko Nagahama	Masaya Honda	December 9, 2018
In order to get out of the barrier, Boruto desperately searches for his heart of stone, but he has little success. Then he encounters Sekki, one of the Genbu Three that participated in the recent Chunin Exams. Sekki has also come to the training ground in order to find his heart of stone. Seeing their predicament, Ohnoki tries to help them.
86	"Kozuchi's Will"; Transliteration: "Kozuchi no ishi" (Japanese: コヅチの意志)	Takeru Ogiwara Yūta Suzuki	Kō Shigenobu	December 16, 2018
Ohnoki takes Boruto to a special location to explain his vision of the future, formed after losing his grandchild, Kozuchi, five years ago. Wishing to fulfill Kozuchi's will of a peaceful village, Ohnoki created a soulless army who would protect the weak, labeled as "Fabrications" which would become the Akuta Troops. Seeing Mitsuki as a perfect artificial human to be used for the Fabrications' studies, Onhoki reveals he needs Mitsuki for experiments. Meanwhile, time is running out for Ku and his supporters. They rush to set their plan in motion - using force to subdue any who dissent, they attempt to take over the Hidden Stone Village. Meanwhile, though Boruto understands Ohnoki's ways, he is in conflict with him due to the fact Mitsuki has his own will.
87	"The Sensation of Living"; Transliteration: "Ikiteiru jikkan" (Japanese: 生きている実感)	Masayuki Kōda	Hideto Tanaka	December 23, 2018
Kakou appears to take the former Tsuchikage back to the village, but Boruto confronts him and they fight. Kakou uses a rare and powerful Particle Style and pushes Boruto to the edge. Meanwhile, Shikadai manages to slip through the Akuta guards and heads for the Hidden Leaf to report on the situation in the Hidden Stone. Sarada and Cho-Cho join Boruto's fight but despite their efforts the Fabrications overpowers them. Before Kakou finishes them, he suddenly dies as his body broke down from overuse of his jutsu. Shortly afterwards, more Fabrications appear, cornering Boruto and his allies.
88	"Clash: Kokuyou!"; Transliteration: "Gekitotsu, Kokuyō!!" (Japanese: 激突、コクヨウ!!)	Taiki Nishimura	Atsushi Nishiyama	January 6, 2019
Boruto and Sarada are caught and taken back to the Hidden Stone headquarters along with Ohnoki. There, they find that Ku and his supporters have taken the village, and that things have changed drastically as Ohnoki is horrified to learn Ku intends to sacrifice he was meant to protect to prolong his life. Kokuyou and Kirara swoop down on Boruto and Sarada, but Shikadai comes to the rescue. The Ino-Shika-Cho Team face Kokuyou in a cave where they trick the Fabrication but are unable to take the upperhand until Akkun that Inojin befriended sacrifices itself to help them defeat Kokuyou. Meanwhile, Kirara keeps facing Boruto and Sarada.
89	"A Piercing Heart"; Transliteration: "Tsuranuku kokoro" (Japanese: 貫く心)	Yūsuke Onoda	Tōko Machida	January 13, 2019
After Boruto and Sarada part ways with Shikadai and the others, Kirara appears and turns them into "dolls" that must obey her, ordering the two to kill each other. Meanwhile, thinking about Boruto's words and how his village is becoming something different than what he envisioned, Ohnoki realizes that he has made a mistake and decides to stop the Fabrications. Sekiei's weakened body causes him to be put to rest while talking with Mitsuki. Hearing the news of her comrades, Kirara leaves the area but Sarada manages to stop the Genjutsu she placed on them. Boruto and Sarada reach Mitsuki but they are surrounded by the Fabrications. When delivering the heart to Ku, Mitsuki instead betrays him and attacks him, revealing he was an agent working to take them down. Mitsuki makes peace with Boruto and Sarada but the trio is confronted by the remaining Fabrications.
90	"Mitsuki and Sekiei"; Transliteration: "Mitsuki to Sekiei" (Japanese: ミツキとセキエイ)	Takeru Ogiwara	Masahiro Ōkubo	January 20, 2019
Sustaining great damage from Mitsuki's attack, Ku flees the scene. Boruto and Sarada attempt to chase after him, but Kirara blocks their path. Joining forces with Garaga, Boruto and Sarada manage to defeat and kill Kirara. Shocked and confused by the actions of Mitsuki, Sekiei recklessly attacks him. Not wanting to fight, Mitsuki tries to stop him. Mitsuki unwilllingly defeats him, stating that he always thought that Sekiei was a friend to him. Before Sekiei dies, Mitsuki makes peace with him. Mitsuki then reunites with Boruto and Sarada and confront Ku, who has recovered thanks to a heart he stole.
91	"Ohnoki's Will"; Transliteration: "Ōnoki no ishi" (Japanese: オオノキの意志)	Kaito Asakura	Masaya Honda	January 27, 2019
Ku appears once again to provoke and attack Boruto, Sarada and Mitsuki. Meanwhile, Ohnoki prepares for a fight to the death in order to stop Ku from doing any more harm, joining Boruto eventually. Naruto also leads a group of ninja to the Hidden Stone to protect their comrades. Before Ku finishes Mitsuki, Ohnoki confronts him. Ohnoki manages to kill Ku in combat and makes peace with himself. Though Mitsuki believes he is not welcome anymore, Teams 5 and 15 come to greet him.
92	"A New Ordinary"; Transliteration: "Atarashī nichijō" (Japanese: 新しい日常)	Yūjirō Abe	Kō Shigenobu	February 3, 2019
After Ohnoki's death, the Leaf ninjas return to their village. While Mitsuki is debriefed by Sai and Konohamaru, Boruto and Sarada lose their genin rank for leaving the village. After saying farewell to Garaga, Boruto goes to stop Mitsuki from leaving the village. As Sarada catches them, the trio makes peace and decide to work together again as Kurotsuchi honors their help to the Stone Village. Seeing the hidden meaning in Kurotsuchi's words, Naruto reinstated Team 7. Meanwhile, Orochimaru and Log wonder what happened to the scientist who created the Fabrications.
93	"Parent and Child Day"; Transliteration: "Oyako no hi" (Japanese: 親子の日)	Norihiko Nagahama	Hideto Tanaka	February 10, 2019
As the Hidden Leaf announces a special day of vacations, Naruto decides to spend a day with his children. Himawari asks him to buy a plush based on the fox Kurama but they are unable to find it in any store with Naruto confusing one with Shukaku. As Naruto and Himawari keep searching for a Kurama, they meet Kiba Inuzuka who got a toy but they instead realize a ninja abandoned his mission to take it from him. Himawari instead tells the ninja to keep the toy for his son and starts liking the Shukaku Naruto bought.
94	"A Heaping Helping! The Eating Contest!"; Transliteration: "Tenkomori!! Ōgui batoru" (Japanese: てんこ盛り!! 大食いバトル)	Masayuki Matsumoto	Atsushi Nishiyama	February 17, 2019
Boruto comes across an eating contest, held by the popular eateries in the Leaf for Parent and Child Day. Choji and Cho-Cho are all for it. Many families participate but they do not know that this event has an outrageous hidden motive arranged by the organizers.
95	"Tactics for Getting Along With Your Daughter"; Transliteration: "Musume to Icha Icha dai sakusen" (Japanese: 娘とイチャイチャ大作戦)	Takeru Ogiwara Yūta Suzuki	Tōko Machida	February 24, 2019
After listening to Boruto explain the village's new holiday, Sasuke recalls the time he spent with his father, Fugaku, and his beloved brother Itachi, and decides to spend time with Sarada. He seeks aid from Kakashi but every action recommended results in Sarada being embarrassed by her father. A frustrated Sasuke then finds aid in his wife who tells him more information about Sarada's past. Sasuke then goes to train with his daughter while he reveals he once had a flawed idea of becoming the Hokage, he still supports Sarada's own dream. As Sasuke and Sarada once again bond, the latter convinces Boruto to have more time with his father.
96	"Blood, Sweat, and Namida"; Transliteration: "Chi to ase to Namida" (Japanese: 血と汗となみだ)	Takeru Ogiwara Yūta Suzuki	Hideto Tanaka	March 3, 2019
Namida from Team 15 uses an earsplitting cry that can temporarily paralyze or knock out an opponent, but frets that her inability to control this special jutsu makes her a danger to even her allies. Worried that she’ll become a hindrance during missions, Namida decides to stop crying to prevent the jutsu from accidentally activating.
97	"Shikadai's Decision"; Transliteration: "Shikadai no ketsudan" (Japanese: シカダイの決断)	Takashi Asami	Masahiro Ōkubo	March 10, 2019
The Nara clan's chief elder tells Shikadai to quit being a ninja and become a politician in order to increase their clan's reputation. Shikadai is hesitant, but considers his father's position and accepts. His friends are surprised by Shikadai's sudden decision. Shikadai takes a hiatus from ninja missions and decides to study to become a politician.
98	"The Cursed Forest"; Transliteration: "Norowareta mori" (Japanese: 呪われた森)	Yūsuke Onoda	Masaya Honda	March 17, 2019
Birds are attacking the residents of a village located on the outskirts of the Land of Fire. Boruto's and Sumire's teams are assigned a joint mission to identify the cause.
99	"Jugo and The Curse Mark"; Transliteration: "Jūgo to juin" (Japanese: 重吾と呪印)	Masayuki Matsumoto	Atsushi Nishiyama	March 24, 2019
Boruto and Sarada arrive at a certain location to see Jugo, following information gathered from the villagers. But they find Jugo suffering from the effects of the Curse Mark and transformed into a ferocious monster.
100	"The Predestined Path"; Transliteration: "Kimerareta michi" (Japanese: 決められた道)	Ayumu Ono	Tōko Machida	March 31, 2019
Under Konohamaru's orders, Sumire and the rest of Team 15 head back to report on the situation before they are ambushed by a mysterious enemy.
101	"Jugo's Reinforcements"; Transliteration: "Jūgo no engun" (Japanese: 重吾の援軍)	Shigenori Kageyama Natsumi Yasue	Kō Shigenobu	April 7, 2019
Sumire is able to escape with Nue's help and begins searching for Wasabi and Namida and then Jugo's friends Suigetsu and Karin suddenly appear.
102	"Melee!"; Transliteration: "Ransen!!" (Japanese: 乱戦!!)	Yūjirō Abe	Atsushi Nishiyama	April 14, 2019
Sarada and Karin struggle with fighting an enemy who is able to manipulate the power of the Curse Mark at will. Sumire fights alongside Nue to protect everyone, but Nue starts losing control of its powers.
103	"Migration Season"; Transliteration: "Watari no kisetsu" (Japanese: 渡りの季節)	Takeru Ogiwara	Masaya Honda	April 21, 2019
Despite feeling the effects of Tosaka's sedatives, Boruto follows Jugo to the lake as the Curse-Mark infected geese start flocking together to commence their migration. Tosaka assumes his Curse Mark Mode and overpowers Boruto until Jugo transforms and defeats the scientist, rendering him normal after absorbing his curse mark, before attacking Boruto as Nue saves him despite acting against Sumire's orders. Jugo eventually reverts to normal after seeing a domesticated goose after Boruto's gambit with his Rasengan failed. Meanwhile, Karin concerned that the girl can't bring herself to cull the birds, Sarada was adamant to kill the geese when Mistuki stops her, Konohamaru having acquired an antidote to the Curse Mark which Suigestu ingests before merging into the lake to spread the cure to the birds. As Sumire confides to her teammates her intent to join the Scientific Ninja Weapons Team to find a scientific method to synergise with Nue, Konohamaru learns that Karin and Suigetsu took Tosaka with them while Jugo remains by the lake.
104	"The Little Roommate"; Transliteration: "Chīsana dōkyonin" (Japanese: 小さな同居人)	Yūta Suzuki	Tōko Machida	April 28, 2019
Team 7 is sent on a mission to help capture a jewelry thief, but they lose track of them. In the thief's place, a cat appears. Boruto and the others decide that Mitsuki should take care of it for the time being.

== Home media release ==
=== Japanese ===
Aniplex (Japan, Region 2)
DVD	Release date	Discs	Episodes	DVD-BOX	Release date	Discs	Episodes
14	September 5, 2018	1	51–54	4	January 9, 2019	5	51–70
15	October 3, 2018	1	55–58	4	January 9, 2019	5	51–70
16	November 7, 2018	1	59–62	4	January 9, 2019	5	51–70
17	December 5, 2018	1	63–66	4	January 9, 2019	5	51–70
18	January 9, 2019	1	67–70	4	January 9, 2019	5	51–70
19	February 6, 2019	1	71–75	5	June 5, 2019	5	71–92
20	March 6, 2019	1	76–80	5	June 5, 2019	5	71–92
21	April 3, 2019	1	81–84	5	June 5, 2019	5	71–92
22	May 15, 2019	1	85–88	5	June 5, 2019	5	71–92
23	June 5, 2019	1	89–92	5	June 5, 2019	5	71–92
24	July 3, 2019	1	93–97	6	November 6, 2019	5	93–115
25	August 7, 2019	1	98–101	6	November 6, 2019	5	93–115
26	September 4, 2019	1	102–105	6	November 6, 2019	5	93–115

=== English ===
Viz Media (North America, Region A / 1)
Set	Release date	Discs	Episodes	Ref.
5	April 21, 2020	2	53–66	
6	July 14, 2020	2	67–79	
7	October 13, 2020	2	80–92	
8	January 12, 2021	2	93–105	

Madman Entertainment (Australia and New Zealand, Region B / 4)
Part	Release date	Discs	Episodes	Ref.
5	July 8, 2020	2	53–66	
6	October 7, 2020	2	67–79	
7	January 13, 2021	2	80–92	
8	May 5, 2021	2	93–105	
