= Boruto: Naruto Next Generations episodes 105–156 =

- Series 3
- Cover of the sixth home media box set release of the series featuring Boruto Uzumaki and various others.
- No. of episodes: 52

Release
- Original network: TV Tokyo
- Original release: May 5, 2019 – July 12, 2020

Series chronology
- ← Previous; List 2 (#53–104) Next → List 4 (#157–208)

Boruto: Naruto Next Generations is a Japanese anime series based on the manga series of the same name and is a spin-off and sequel to Masashi Kishimoto's Naruto. It is produced by Pierrot and broadcast on TV Tokyo. The anime is directed by Masayuki Kōda (#105–281) and written by Masaya Honda (#67–). Former manga writer Ukyō Kodachi supervised the story until episode 216.

Boruto follows the exploits of Naruto Uzumaki's son Boruto and his comrades from the Hidden Leaf Village's ninja academy as they seek their own paths in life. Despite being based on the manga, the anime also explores original storylines and adaptations of the spin-off manga, Naruto: The Seventh Hokage and the Scarlet Spring; Boruto: Naruto the Movie; and the Naruto Shinden light novel series.

It premiered on TV Tokyo on April 5, 2017, and aired every Wednesday at 5:55 PM JST. Starting May 3, 2018 (episode 56) it aired every Thursday at 7:25 PM JST. Beginning on October 7, 2018 (episode 76) the series moved to Sundays at 5:30 PM JST. The series is also released on DVD. Viz Media licensed the series on March 23, 2017, to simulcast it on Hulu, and on Crunchyroll. On April 21, 2020, it was announced that episode 155 and onward would be delayed due to the ongoing COVID-19 pandemic. After a two-month hiatus, the episode resumed on July 5, 2020.

The opening theme songs are "Golden Time" by Fujifabric (episodes 101–126), "Teenage Dream" by Miwa (episodes 127–150), and "Hajimatteiku Takamatteiku" by Sambomaster (episodes 151–180).

The ending theme songs are "Ride or Die" by Skypeace (episodes 101–113), "Mikansei na Hikari-tachi" by Haruka Fukuhara (episodes 114–126), "Wish On" by Longman (episodes 127–138), "Fireworks" by FlowBack (episodes 139–150), and "Maybe I" by Seven Billion Dots (episodes 151–167).

== Episode list ==
No.	Title (Note: All English titles are taken from Crunchyroll.)	Directed by	Written by	Original release date
105	"A Wound on the Heart"; Transliteration: "Kokoro no kizuguchi" (Japanese: 心の傷口)	Shigeki Awai	Hideto Tanaka	May 5, 2019
Mitsuki visits Orochimaru's research facility because he's not feeling well. Mitsuki explains to Orochimaru and Log that he never used to dream during sleep, but has recently begun to have them. Hearing Mitsuki's story, Orochimaru thinks of a solution.
106	"The Steam Ninja Scrolls: The S-Rank Mission!"; Transliteration: "Yukemuri ninpōchō: esu ranku ninmu!!" (Japanese: 湯煙忍法帖・Sランク任務!!)	Masayuki Matsumoto	Masaya Honda	May 12, 2019
Konohamaru's cousin, Mirai Sarutobi, is assigned to escort the Sixth Hokage Kakashi and his friend Might Guy to the hot springs.
107	"The Steam Ninja Scrolls: The Dog and Cat War!"; Transliteration: "Yukemuri ninpōchō: inuneko sensō!!" (Japanese: 湯煙忍法帖・犬猫戦争!!)	Yūsuke Onoda	Kō Shigenobu	May 19, 2019
Mirai and crew arrive at the hot springs located near the border of the Land of Fire and the Land of Steam in time for a festival celebrating dogs and cats. But Mirai—always on the job – just can't relax!
108	"The Steam Ninja Scrolls: The Haunted Inn!"; Transliteration: "Yukemuri ninpōchō: yūrei ryokan!!" (Japanese: 湯煙忍法帖・幽霊旅館!!)	Kaito Asakura	Masahiro Ōkubo	May 26, 2019
A few days into the mission, Mirai visits the hot spring with Tenten, Guy's former student. But that moment of relaxation is interrupted by Guy yelling about a ghost.
109	"The Steam Ninja Scrolls: Potato Chips and the Giant Boulder!"; Transliteration: "Yukemuri ninpōchō: potechi to ō iwa!!" (Japanese: 湯煙忍法帖・ポテチと大岩!!)	Yūichirō Aoki	Atsushi Nishiyama	June 2, 2019
Mirai, Kakashi, and Guy travel with Tatsumi to a village with a secret hot spring, but they find the hot spring covered by a boulder! Luckily, Choji drops in, armed with the Akimichi Clan's Secret Super Expansion Jutsu, but he's too hungry and can't utilize the full extent of his abilities.
110	"The Steam Ninja Scrolls: The Resurrection Hot Springs!"; Transliteration: "Yukemuri ninpōchō: yomigaeri onsen!!" (Japanese: 湯煙忍法帖・蘇り温泉!!)	Taiji Kawanishi	Touko Machida	June 9, 2019
Moved by Tatsumi's efforts to accomplish her goal all by herself, Mirai decides to help her even though she's still in the middle of her mission.
111	"The Steam Ninja Scrolls: Mirai's King!"; Transliteration: "Yukemuri ninpōchō: Mirai no gyoku!!" (Japanese: 湯煙忍法帖・ミライの玉!!)	Takeru Ogiwara	Masaya Honda	June 16, 2019
Mirai leaves the inn with Tatsumi without telling Kakashi and Guy. At the hot springs Mirai thinks she sees her father Asuma, but something feels off. Will Mirai be able to get back to her escort mission in one piece?
112	"The Chunin Selection Conference"; Transliteration: "Chūnin shōkaku shunō kaigi" (Japanese: 中忍昇格首脳会議)	Yūta Suzuki	Hideto Tanaka	June 23, 2019
Naruto and Shikamaru deliberate on the results of the Chunin Exam that were left unsettled due to the Otsutsuki attack. Sasuke returns, looking for clues about the Otsutsuki Clan. In the end, in a sense of deja vu, they promote Shikadai to Chunin.
113	"The Qualities of a Captain"; Transliteration: "Taichō no soshitsu" (Japanese: 隊長の素質)	Nao Miyoshi	Atsushi Nishiyama	June 30, 2019
With Shikadai as captain, Boruto, Iwabe, and Wasabi form a special team for a mission to find and bring back a rare flower that only blooms for a short period of time. What should have been a simple mission ends up progressing slower than expected as the team continues to argue.
114	"X Cards Proxy War!"; Transliteration: "Gemaki dairi sensō!!" (Japanese: ゲマキ代理戦争!!)	Shigeki Awai	Kō Shigenobu	July 7, 2019
Extreme Ninja Cards, featuring famous shinobi from history, is the most popular game in recent times. As Boruto and his friends eagerly collect the cards, they realize they are still missing their former teacher, Shino Aburame, and Metal's father, Rock Lee, they also learn that there's only one space left in the upcoming series, a fierce battle begins between Boruto, who thinks it should be Shino, and Metal, who stands behind his father. Which candidate will make the final slot?
115	"Team 25"; Transliteration: "Dainijūgo han" (Japanese: 第二十五班)	Kuriyama Yoshihide	Masahiro Ōkubo	July 14, 2019
Kakashi goes to the post office – disguised as Sukea, a freelance journalist – to observe Team 25, whose mission is to assist with sorting mail. Houki Taketori, Hako Kuroi and Renga Kokubou are genin, and Boruto's former classmates. As a team, they haven't distinguished themselves, so the missions they are assigned to always consist of simple tasks. Furthermore, they lack teamwork. To find the reason for this, Kakashi decides to talk to Houki; who for some reason dresses just like him.
116	"Konohamaru and Remon"; Transliteration: "Konohamaru to Remon" (Japanese: 木ノ葉丸とレモン)	Kaito Asakura	Hideto Tanaka	July 21, 2019
One day, Boruto and Konohamaru rescue a woman named Remon Yoimura from an attack. Remon says she has come to the Hidden Leaf Village for sightseeing. Boruto and Konohamaru offer to show her around the Leaf and provide some protection as well.
117	"Remon's Secret"; Transliteration: "Remon no himitsu" (Japanese: レモンの秘密)	Yūsuke Onoda	Atsushi Nishiyama	July 28, 2019
Boruto and Konohamaru pay a visit to Remon's village, but are puzzled by Remon's cold demeanor. It turns out that Remon is a descendant of the Souma, a family that has protected the village from goblins for many generations. Thus, she is not allowed to leave the village freely. Furthermore, an important ritual is to be held shortly, so Kankitsu Akitsuki, Remon's childhood friend, imprisons her to prevent her from seeing anyone.
118	"Something That Steals Memories"; Transliteration: "Kioku o kurau mono" (Japanese: 記憶を喰らうモノ)	Masayuki Matsumoto	Tōko Machida	August 4, 2019
Konohamaru tries to rescue Remon by checking up on Kankitsu, but he is caught and forcibly taken back to the Leaf Village. Boruto becomes suspicious when he sees Kankitsu alone and acting as if nothing has happened. He decides to investigate the situation, only to be shocked by the sight that unfolds before him! Meanwhile, Konohamaru is disciplined by the Hokage after receiving a complaint from Remon's village.
119	"Konohamaru's Ninja Way"; Transliteration: "Konohamaru no nindō" (Japanese: 木ノ葉丸の忍道)	Ayumu Ono	Hideto Tanaka	August 11, 2019
Konohamaru and Boruto set out again to rescue Remon but find they've arrived a little late. Soma has broken the seal and begins his resurrection. Boruto and Konohamaru try desperately to stop this, but none of their weapons and ninjutsu work against him. Watching them, Remon is inspired to carry out her vow and employ the method her ancestor used long ago to seal the monster.
120	"With Sasuke As The Goal"; Transliteration: "Sasuke o mezashite" (Japanese: サスケを目指して)	Kōji Sasaki	Masaya Honda	August 18, 2019
Learning that Sasuke is at the Hidden Sand Village to protect areas of possible threats, Boruto travels there to train with his mentor again. Along the way, Boruto meets two isolated villagers and protects them from a group of delinquent thieves seeking the official ownership of the territory. Boruto finds Sasuke and Gaara facing Urashiki who is after the tailed beast known as Shukaku the One Tail. Urashiki is using puppets created by Toneri and traps Sasuke in another dimension.
121	"The Entrusted Mission: Protect the One Tails!"; Transliteration: "Ichibi o mamore!! Takusareta ninmu" (Japanese: 一尾を守れ!! 託された任務)	Takeru Ogiwara	Yuki Kimura Masaya Honda	August 25, 2019
Gaara exhausts most of his chakra from trapping Urashiki with Shukaku's help, giving Kankuro a mission to transport Shukaku to the Hidden Leaf with support from Boruto and Shiki so the tailed beast can be protected by Naruto. Although Urashiki remains inactive, he has his puppets attack Kankuro's team the following day. Kankuro decides to stay behind to hold the enemy puppets off while Boruto and Shinki continue the mission on their own.
122	"The Puppet Battle!"; Transliteration: "Kugutsu batoru!!" (Japanese: 傀儡バトル!!)	Yūta Suzuki	Kō Shigenobu	September 1, 2019
Kankuro takes the upperhand in the battle against Urashiki's puppets, but is caught into an explosion with Boruto assuming the worst despite Shinki wanting to continue the mission. Boruto finds Temari and Shikadai, who learned about Gaara's weakened state and Sasuke's disappearance. Temari lectures Boruto for not believing in Shinki's love for his uncle but still goes with Shikadai and Boruto to catch up with Shinki. As this happens, Urashiki breaks free once Gaara's seal is broken.
123	"Urashiki Returns"; Transliteration: "Urashiki, fukkatsu" (Japanese: ウラシキ、復活)	Shigeki Awai	Masahiro Ōkubo	September 8, 2019
Shinki begins fighting Urashiki's remaining puppet, falling back with Boruto, Temari and Shikadai after being wounded. The group has a rematch with the puppet which they manage to win. Temari tells Boruto to catch up to Shinki, while she and Shikadai recover and look for Kankuro. As Boruto and Shinki continue with their mission, Urashiki spots them.
124	"Decision Time"; Transliteration: "Ketsudan no toki" (Japanese: 決断の時)	Kiyomu Fukuda	Atsushi Nishiyama	September 15, 2019
Urashiki ambushes Boruto and Shinki, only to be temporary sealed by young ninja duo as they decide to rest in Gojo's house. But they find that the area has been destroyed and Gojo wounded, realizing that Urashiki has got ahead of them with Boruto and Shukaku splitting off from Shinki to outwit their pursuer. Meanwhile, Sasuke uses his Rinnegan to escape Urashiki's dimension.
125	"Boruto and Shinki"; Transliteration: "Boruto to Shinki" (Japanese: ボルトとシンキ)	Masayuki Matsumoto	Hideto Tanaka	September 22, 2019
After accomplishing his mission, Shinki returns to help Boruto in fighting Urashiki but the two are unable to defeat him. When Urashiki is about to kill them, Sasuke interrupts the fight, forcing the enemy to retreat. As Kankuro is found, Boruto, Shinki and Shikadai rest in the Hidden Leaf Village. Despite not understanding his ally, Boruto and Shinki say farewell to each other on good terms.
126	"Shukaku's Trick"; Transliteration: "Shukaku no takurami" (Japanese: 守鶴の企み)	Yūsuke Onoda	Kō Shigenobu	September 29, 2019
Boruto and Shinki bring Shukaku to the Hidden Leaf Village. Upon arriving at the Uzumaki home, Himawari is completely taken with him, but Shukaku finds the entire situation irritating. When told about the day Naruto became the Seventh Hokage – and how Himawari hurt Naruto and Kurama – Shukaku comes up with an idea.
127	"Make-Out Tactics"; Transliteration: "Icha Icha Takutikusu" (Japanese: イチャイチャタクティクス)	Yūta Suzuki	Tōko Machida	October 6, 2019
Boruto becomes fascinated by Jiraiya, Naruto's former mentor. Inspired to train, he goes to Sasuke's house, where Sarada mentions Jiraiya's novel. Convinced that reading the novel is the fastest way to learn about Jiraiya, the search for Make-Out Tactics begins.
128	"Urashiki's Target"; Transliteration: "Urashiki no nerai" (Japanese: ウラシキの狙い)	Hiroyuki Okuno	Masaya Honda	October 13, 2019
Boruto is forbidden to participate in the counterattack on Urashiki because he was previously targeted by the Otsutsuki. Frustrated by this decision, Boruto argues with Naruto when a report comes in that Urashiki has been located.
129	"The Village Hidden in the Leaves"; Transliteration: "Konohagakure no sato" (Japanese: 木ノ葉隠れの里)	Tazumi Mukaiyama	Atsushi Nishiyama	October 20, 2019
While chasing down Urashiki, Boruto and Sasuke get hit with a strange Otsutsuki weapon. They find themselves in the Hidden Leaf, but years before Boruto was born. Although there's no sign of Urashiki, Sasuke thinks they should proceed carefully. Suddenly, a very young Naruto appears with Jiraiya and the two start questioning the "outsiders".
130	"Genin, Assemble!"; Transliteration: "Atsumare, genin!!" (Japanese: 集まれ、下忍!!)	Yoshiharu Shimizu Yūta Suzuki	Masahiro Ōkubo	October 27, 2019
Boruto and Sasuke end up staying in the Hidden Leaf under the watchful eyes of Naruto and Jiraiya. At first, Boruto feels uncomfortable being with Naruto, but gradually warms up to him. Meanwhile, a group of genin – Sakura, Hinata, and Neji – are summoned for duty along with their chunin leader, Shikamaru. Boruto and Naruto head to the designated meeting place and find something unexpected.
131	"The Power of the Nine Tails"; Transliteration: "Kyūbi no chikara" (Japanese: 九尾のカ)	Masayuki Matsumoto	Hideto Tanaka	November 3, 2019
Urashiki appears to steal the chakra of Nine Tails from Naruto, but his attempt is unsuccessful. In order to save Naruto, Boruto, Sasuke and Jiraiya pursue Urashiki. Jiraiya then notices that the malevolent Nine Tails Chakra has started filling the air.
132	"Jiraiya's Assignment"; Transliteration: "Jiraiya no kadai" (Japanese: 自来也の課題)	Shigeki Awai	Kō Shigenobu	November 10, 2019
Boruto and young Naruto are training under Jiraiya to develop a new Jutsu. Boruto traumatized by the Nine Tails injury seeks advice from one of his Kin. Meanwhile, Jiraiya questions Sasuke about his pep talk with Naruto that led into a series of unexpected outcomes.
133	"A Village Without Sasuke"; Transliteration: "Sasuke no inai sato" (Japanese: サスケのいない里)	Akira Yamada	Tōko Machida	November 24, 2019
Boruto and Naruto resume their training. Meanwhile, Sasuke is at a loss for words when Jiraiya expresses doubt about his identity. However, Jiraiya says that he will not pry if they join forces to come up with a strategy to defeat Urashiki.
134	"The Power to See the Future"; Transliteration: "Mirai o yomu chikara" (Japanese: 未来を読むチカラ)	Toshiaki Kamihara	Masaya Honda	December 1, 2019
Boruto and Naruto flee after their battle with Urashiki when Sasuke takes Urashiki with himself and jumps into a river injuring himself. They figure out the ability of Urashiki and fight their way to land a rasengan on Urashiki beating him unconscious.
135	"The Last Battle, Urashiki"; Transliteration: "Saishū kessen, Urashiki" (Japanese: 最終決戦、ウラシキ)	Masayuki Kōda	Atsushi Nishiyama	December 8, 2019
Boruto's quick thinking exposes Urashiki's trick that enables him to see into the future and they manage to inflict some damage. However, Urashiki remains with the upperhand and tries to take Naruto once again. When Jiraiya is wounded shielding the attack, the young ninja is filled with rage, awakening Kurama's chakra. Boruto manages to calm Naruto and the two join forces with Jiraiya and Sasuke to kill Urashiki.
136	"Crossing Time!"; Transliteration: "Toki o koete!!" (Japanese: 時を越えて!!)	Yūsuke Onoda	Masahiro Ōkubo	December 15, 2019
The battle against Urashiki is over, and it is time for Boruto and Sasuke to return to the place where they rightfully belong. Boruto is wistful about leaving Jiraiya and Naruto. Suddenly, Jiraiya makes a request to Sasuke.
137	"The Samurai Exchange Student"; Transliteration: "Samurai ryūgakusei" (Japanese: サムライ留学生)	Ayumu Ono	Kyōko Katsuya	December 22, 2019
Sumire's wish comes true and she joins the Scientific Ninja Tools Team, leaving only Wasabi and Namida on Team 15. A new member, Tsubaki Kurogane, a young girl who hails from the Land of Iron, joins them.
138	"Hiashi's Birthday"; Transliteration: "Hiashi no tanjōbi" (Japanese: ヒアシの誕生日)	Michita Shiraishi	Kō Shigenobu	December 29, 2019
Boruto's grandfather Hiashi's birthday is approaching and there's going to be a small family celebration. Boruto is chosen to select a birthday present, but he doesn't know what will please his grandfather, so he visits the Hyuga household and sneakily gathers information.
139	"The Terror! Enko Onikuma"; Transliteration: "Kyōfu!! Onikuma Enko" (Japanese: 恐怖!! 鬼熊えんこ)	Tazumi Mukaiyama	Hideto Tanaka	January 12, 2020
Enko Onikuma – one of Boruto's former classmates and a member of Team 40 – was possessed by a summoning Beast as a child. Now, she can manifest its enormous power. But lately, she has not been able to control her power, hindering her work on missions. Meanwhile, Ibiki Morino approaches Enko and tells her that she will be working under him going forward.
140	"The Mind Transfer Jutsu that Lost to Potato Chips"; Transliteration: "Potechi ni maketa shintenshin no jutsu" (Japanese: ポテチに負けた心転身の術)	Masayuki Matsumoto	Tōko Machida	January 19, 2020
Inojin approaches his parents about mastering the Mind Transfer Jutsu. Cho-Cho agrees to assist and everything is set for training to begin. With his father Sai observing, Inojin starts training with Ino. But due to his lack of confidence, Inojin's unable to execute the jutsu, which ends up irritating his mother.
141	"The Shinobi Prison: Hozuki Castle"; Transliteration: "Shinobi kangoku: Hōzuki-jō" (Japanese: 忍監獄・鬼灯城)	Shigeki Awai	Masaya Honda	January 26, 2020
Hozuki Castle is a prison run by the Hidden Grass, well known for being notoriously difficult to escape from. Boruto and Mitsuki are sent there to protect Kokuri, a former member of a brutal band of robbers known as the Mujina Gang who is now targeted by assassins after betraying and deserting the gang.
142	"A Test of Willpower"; Transliteration: "Konjō tameshi" (Japanese: 根性試し)	Kiyomu Fukuda	Atsushi Nishiyama	February 2, 2020
Boruto and his team try to get Kokuri assigned to the same cell, but the warden, Benga, shuts the idea down. Looking for a weakness in Benga, they approach Doragu, the leader among the prisoners, for information they can exploit. Doragu is willing to give them information, but in exchange Boruto and the team must undergo a test of perseverance.
143	"The Criminal Targeting Kokuri"; Transliteration: "Kokuri o neratta han'nin" (Japanese: コクリを狙った犯人)	Yūta Suzuki	Masahiro Ōkubo	February 9, 2020
It is discovered that a wooden tag used to prevent unauthorized entry into the medical unit has been stolen, and the prison guards begin a search for the culprit. Until the offender is found, all prisoners are locked in their cells. Once the culprit is found, each of their cellmates will be forced into solitary confinement. If this happens and the team becomes separated from Kokuri, their mission could be jeopardized.
144	"Kokuri's Secret"; Transliteration: "Kokuri no himitsu" (Japanese: コクリの秘密)	Hodaka Kuramoto	Kyōko Katsuya	February 16, 2020
Boruto and the others can't help but feel that Kokuri is hiding something from them. Meanwhile, Tsukiyo, a lieutenant in the Mujina Gang who's also imprisoned in Hozuki Castle, schemes to get Kokuri transferred to Hozuki Castle II, where his henchmen lie in wait.
145	"Breaking out of Hozuki Castle"; Transliteration: "Hōzuki-jō o datsugoku seyo" (Japanese: 鬼灯城を脱獄せよ)	Yūsuke Onoda	Masaya Honda	February 23, 2020
Boruto and Mitsuki worry that their mission is in jeopardy, since Kokuri is scheduled to be transferred to Hozuki Castle II. They decide to escape with Kokuri before he's moved. As they discuss their strategy with Sarada, their cellmate Kedama overhears them.
146	"Executing the Prison Break!"; Transliteration: "Datsugoku, kekkō!!" (Japanese: 脱獄、決行!!)	Hideaki Uehara	Atsushi Nishiyama	March 1, 2020
The clock ticks down to the rendezvous time for the escape, but there's no word from Sarada. If they miss this chance, everything will be ruined. Boruto puts his faith in Sarada and proceeds as planned with Mitsuki and Kokuri. Meanwhile, Sarada's lost consciousness from falling to the underground level of Hozuki Castle.
147	"The Fateful Moonlit Battle"; Transliteration: "Gekka no kessen" (Japanese: 月下の決戦)	Yūta Suzuki	Kō Shigenobu	March 8, 2020
Boruto and the team are waiting for the escape boat when Tsukiyo appears. Boruto and his team fight desperately in order to protect Kokuri, but they're tormented by Tsukiyo's jutsu as time threatens to run out on their prison break!
148	"A New Mission!!"; Transliteration: "Aratana ninmu!!" (Japanese: 新たな任務!!)	Michita Shiraishi	Hideto Tanaka	March 15, 2020
Boruto has a dream about the day he defeated Momoshiki Otsutsuki. It ends up bothering him so much that he can't focus on his mission. He then meets Tento, the son of Ikkyu Madoka – the Feudal Lord of the Land of Fire – who's in the Hidden Leaf for a meeting with the Hokage.
149	"Friends!!"; Transliteration: "Tomodachi...!!" (Japanese: 友達...!!)	Ōri Yasukawa	Tōko Machida	March 22, 2020
Boruto's new mission is to guard Tento, who is obsessed with ninja and collecting X Cards. He begs Boruto to teach him ninja skills, and Boruto thinks this will be a good opportunity to knock some sense into Tento. Meanwhile, the Mujina Gang, which had been laying low after Team 7's infiltration mission at Hozuki Castle, rears its ugly head.
150	"The Value of a Hidden Ace"; Transliteration: "Kirifuda no kachi" (Japanese: 切り札の価値)	Masayuki Matsumoto	Kyōko Katsuya	March 29, 2020
After completing his mission to guard Tento, Boruto is assigned a new B-rank mission with Sarada and Mitsuki. Boruto is excited to start but he finds the rare X Card that he had wanted in his pocket. Realizing that this was from Tento, he goes to their hotel and learns that Tento's life is in danger.
151	"Boruto and Tento"; Transliteration: "Boruto to Tentō" (Japanese: ボルトとテントウ)	Yūta Suzuki	Masahiro Ōkubo	April 5, 2020
Boruto rushes to save Tento, but Shojoji the leader of the Mujina Gang blocks his way. Boruto dodges to protect Tento, but Shojoji and his Corpse Clone Jutsu prove to be too powerful. In the midst of all this, the mark on Boruto's palm reacts and paralyzes him.
152	"Developing One's Medical Ninjutsu"; Transliteration: "Iryō ninjutsu no susume" (Japanese: 医療忍術のすすめ)	Shigeki Awai	Kyōko Katsuya	April 12, 2020
A training class on Medical Ninjutsu is to be held, and each team must send a representative. Sarada is chosen for Team 7. Despite Sakura being a Medical Ninjutsu specialist, Sarada doesn't have a knack for it and being a participant fills her with anxiety.
153	"Harmony in Gold"; Transliteration: "Ōgon no hāmonī" (Japanese: 黄金のハーモニー)	Ayumu Ono	Atsushi Nishiyama	April 19, 2020
Tsubaki, Sumire's replacement on Team 15, is proud of her samurai upbringing and is highly skilled, but her team's overall mission performance is lackluster. Tsubaki devises a plan to hone her team's skills, where they fight for who performs best on missions.
154	"Himawari's Ninja Trial Session"; Transliteration: "Himawari, ninja taiken!!" (Japanese: ヒマワリ、忍者体験!!)	Yūsuke Onoda	Hideto Tanaka	April 26, 2020
Himawari attends the Ninja Academy's trial session where participants get a taste of ninja training. Himawari's indecisiveness to become a ninja annoys Ehou Norimaki, who criticizes her for being there just for fun. Things become uncomfortable when they're assigned to the same team.
155	"Mitsuki's Rainy Day"; Transliteration: "Ame no hi no Mitsuki" (Japanese: 雨の日のミツキ)	Hideaki Uehara	Kō Shigenobu	July 5, 2020 (Note: This episode was originally scheduled to air on May 3, 2020, but was subsequently delayed.)
One rainy night, guided by Mikazuki the cat, Mitsuki rescues an injured man. Mysteriously, Mikazuki seems to take a liking to the man who says he's come to visit his sister who works in the Leaf Village. Soon after, Team 7 is assigned to back up the Leaf Police Force on a security mission. Their client is a president of a company who is being targeted by a serial killer known as the "Rainy Day Killer".
156	"I Can't Stay in My Slim Form"; Transliteration: "Surimuna mama ja irarenai" (Japanese: スリムなままじゃいられない)	Michita Shiraishi	Tōko Machida	July 12, 2020 (Note: This episode was originally scheduled to air on May 10, 2020, but was subsequently delayed.)
Cho-Cho and Choji go to the sweet shop after their training session, only to be disappointed that they are unusually out of azuki bean sweets. After hearing thieves have been raiding the deliveries, Cho-Cho team up with Anko Mitarashi, her friend in desserts and beloved Ninja Academy instructor, to protect the azuki beans she loves and capture the bandits.

== Home media release ==
=== Japanese ===
Aniplex (Japan, Region 2)
DVD	Release date	Discs	Episodes	DVD-BOX	Release date	Discs	Episodes
26	September 4, 2019	1	102–105	6	November 6, 2019	5	93–115
27	October 2, 2019	1	106–110	6	November 6, 2019	5	93–115
28	November 6, 2019	1	111–115	6	November 6, 2019	5	93–115
29	December 4, 2019	1	116–119	7	April 1, 2020	5	116–136
30	January 15, 2020	1	120–123	7	April 1, 2020	5	116–136
31	February 5, 2020	1	124–128	7	April 1, 2020	5	116–136
32	March 4, 2020	1	129–132	7	April 1, 2020	5	116–136
33	April 1, 2020	1	133–136	7	April 1, 2020	5	116–136
34	June 3, 2020	1	137–140	8	October 7, 2020	5	137–156
35	July 1, 2020	1	141–143	8	October 7, 2020	5	137–156
36	August 5, 2020	1	144–147	8	October 7, 2020	5	137–156
37	September 2, 2020	1	148–151	8	October 7, 2020	5	137–156
38	October 7, 2020	1	152–156	8	October 7, 2020	5	137–156

=== English ===
Viz Media (North America, Region A / 1)
Set	Release date	Discs	Episodes	Ref.
8	January 12, 2021	2	93–105	
9	May 25, 2021	2	106–119	
10	September 21, 2021	3	120–140	
11	November 23, 2021	2	141–155	
12	May 17, 2022	3	156–176	

Madman Entertainment (Australia and New Zealand, Region B / 4)
Part	Release date	Discs	Episodes	Ref.
8	May 5, 2021	2	93–105	
9	July 7, 2021	2	106–119	
10	December 1, 2021	3	120–140	
11	March 9, 2022	2	141–155	
12	August 3, 2022	3	156–176	
