= TENS (disambiguation) =

TENS or tens may refer to:

== Numbers and years ==
- Second column of magnitude in the decimal system
- 10 (number)
- 10s, the decade from January 1, 10 AD to December 31, 19 AD
- The 1910s
- The 2010s

== Medical ==
- Transcutaneous electrical nerve stimulation, electric current therapy
- Toxic epidermal necrolysis, a skin condition

== Other ==
- The Emperor's New School, a cartoon series
- Rugby tens, a variant of rugby union
- Trusted End Node Security, a computer operating system

== See also ==
- Ten (disambiguation)
- Ten dollar bill (disambiguation)
- Tense (disambiguation)
- Teen (disambiguation)
