= Teenager of the Year =

== In Music ==
- Teenager of the Year (album) a 1994 studio album by Frank Black
- "Teenager of the Year (song)" a 2000 song by Lo-Tel

== See also ==
- Teenager (disambiguation)
