= Fujifabric (album) =

Studio album by Fujifabric
- Released: November 10, 2004
- Genre: J-Rock, Alternative rock
- Length: 45:28
- Label: Capitol
- Producer: Akito Katayose

Fujifabric chronology
À la molto (2003)	Fujifabric (2004)	Fab Fox (2005)

Fujifabric (フジファブリック, Fujifaburikku) is the first full studio album by Fujifabric, released in 2004 on the Capitol Records label.

== Track listing ==
1. "Sakura no Kisetsu" (桜の季節)
2. Taifu
3. "Kagerō" (陽炎)
4. "Otteke Otteke" (追ってけ追ってけ)
5. "Uchiage Hanabi" (打上げ花火)
6. "Tokyo Midnight"
7. "Hana" (花)
8. "Saboten Record" (サボテンレコード, Saboten Rekōdo)
9. "Akakiiro no Kinmokusei" (赤黄色の金木犀)
10. "Yogisha" (夜汽車)

== Chart positions ==
Chart (2004)	Peak position
Japan Oricon	17
