= Teenager (disambiguation) =

A teenager is a person between the ages of 13 and 19.

Teenager or teenagers may also refer to:

- Teenager (word), term used to classify the 13-to-19 age group

== Music ==
=== Artists ===
- Teenager (band), an Australian alternative rock band
- The Teenagers, an American doo wop group established in 1954
- The Teenagers (French band), a French synthpop band formed in 2005

=== Albums ===
- Teenager (Fujifabric album), 2008
- Teenager (Jane Siberry album), 1996
- Teenager (The Thrills album), 2007

=== Songs ===
- "Teenager" (George Alice song), 2020
- "Teenager", 2007 song by Jordan Pruitt from the album No Ordinary Girl
- "Teenager", 1993 song by Better Than Ezra from the album Deluxe
- "Teenagers" (song), 2006 song by My Chemical Romance
- "Teenagers", 2009 song by Hayley Williams from the soundtrack Jennifer's Body
- "Teenager(s)", by Meat Puppets, bonus track on the 1999 reissue of Meat Puppets II

== Film ==
- Teenage (2013 American film), a 2013 documentary film
- Teenage (2013 Indian film), a 2013 Kannada film
- Teenager (film), a 2005 film by Yalkin Tuychiev
- The Teen Agers (1946–1948), a film series of campus comedies produced by Monogram
- Teenagers (film), a 1961 Egyptian film
- Teenagers (web series), a Canadian web series

== See also ==
- Adolescent (disambiguation)
- Teen (disambiguation)
