= Fab Fox =

Studio album by Fujifabric
- Released: November 9, 2005
- Genre: Indie rock, alternative rock
- Length: 52:08
- Label: Capitol

Fujifabric chronology
Fujifabric (2004)	Fab Fox (2005)	Teenager (2008)

Fab Fox is the second studio album by Fujifabric, released in 2005 on the Capitol Records label.

== Track listing ==
1. "Mononoke Jacaranda" (モノノケハカランダ, Mononoke Hakaranda)
2. "Sunny Morning"
3. "Ginga" (銀河) (Album Ver.)
4. "Kuchibiru no Sore" (唇のソレ)
5. "Chiheisen o Koete" (地平線を越えて)
6. "Maria to Amazones" (マリアとアマゾネス, Maria to Amazonesu)
7. "Baseball wa Owaranai" (ベースボールは終わらない, Bēsubōru wa Owaranai)
8. "Ame no March" (雨のマーチ, Ame no Māchi)
9. "Mizuame to Wataame" (水飴と綿飴)
10. "Niji" (虹)
11. "Birthday"
12. "Akaneiro no Yūhi" (茜色の夕日)

== Charts ==
Chart (2005)	Peak position
Japan Oricon	12
