= Adolescent (disambiguation) =

Adolescents are humans between the developmental stage of puberty and adulthood.

Adolescent(s) or Adolescence may also refer to:

== Films ==
- Adolescence (film), a 1966 French documentary
- The Adolescent (film), French title L'Adolescente, 1978-79 French drama film directed by Jeanne Moreau
- The Adolescents (1964 film), a drama anthology film
- The Adolescents (1968 film), a Mexican drama directed by Abel Salazar
- Adolescence (film), a 1966 French short documentary by Marin Karmitz
- Adolescents (film), a 2019 French documentary directed by Sébastien Lifshitz

== Music ==
- Adolescents (band), an American punk rock band
  - Adolescents (album), 1981 album by the eponymous band
- "Adolescents" (song), a 2011 song by Incubus
- Adolescence (EP), 2015, by Gnarwolves
- Adolescence (ballet), 1929, by Martha Graham and Paul Hindemith
- Adolescence (mixtape), 2021, by Unknown T

== Other uses ==
- Adolescence (TV series), a 2025 British crime drama
- The Adolescent (book), and An Accidental Family, two alternative titles for The Raw Youth, a novel by Russian writer Fyodor Dostoevsky

== See also ==
- Teenager (disambiguation)
- Youth (disambiguation)
