= Boruto: Naruto Next Generations episodes 157–208 =

- Series 4
- Cover of the ninth home media box set release of the series featuring Mitsuki, Boruto Uzumaki, Sarada Uchiha and Deepa.
- No. of episodes: 52

Release
- Original network: TV Tokyo
- Original release: July 19, 2020 – July 18, 2021

Series chronology
- ← Previous; List 3 (#105–156) Next → List 5 (#209–260)

Boruto: Naruto Next Generations is a Japanese anime series based on the manga series of the same name and is a spin-off of and sequel to Masashi Kishimoto's Naruto. It is produced by Pierrot and broadcast on TV Tokyo. The anime is directed by Masayuki Kōda (#105–281) and is written by Masaya Honda (#67–). Former manga writer Ukyō Kodachi supervised the story until episode 216.

Boruto follows the exploits of Naruto Uzumaki's son Boruto and his comrades from the Hidden Leaf Village's ninja academy while finding a path to follow once they grow up. Despite being based on the manga, the anime explores original storylines and adaptations of the spin-off manga, Naruto: The Seventh Hokage and the Scarlet Spring; Boruto: Naruto the Movie; as well as the Naruto Shinden light novel series.

It premiered on TV Tokyo on April 5, 2017, and aired every Wednesday at 5:55 PM JST. Starting May 3, 2018 (episode 56) it aired every Thursday at 7:25 PM JST. Starting October 7, 2018 (episode 76) it now airs every Sunday at 5:30 PM JST. The series is also being released in DVDs. Viz Media licensed the series on March 23, 2017, to simulcast it on Hulu, and on Crunchyroll.

The opening theme songs are "Hajimatteiku Takamatteiku" by Sambomaster (episodes 151–180), "Baku" by Ikimonogakari (episodes 181–205), and "Gamushara" by Chico with HoneyWorks (episodes 206–230).

The ending theme songs are "Maybe I" by Seven Billion Dots (episodes 151–167), "Central" by Ami Sakaguchi (episodes 168–180), "Answers" by Mol-74 (episodes 181–192), "Kimi ga Ita Shirushi" by halca (episodes 193–205), and "Who are you?" by Pelican Fanclub (episodes 206–218).

== Episode list ==
No.	Title (Note: All English titles are taken from Crunchyroll.)	Directed by	Written by	Original release date
157	"Kara's Footprints"; Transliteration: ""Kara" no ashiato" (Japanese: 「殻」の足跡)	Masayuki Matsumoto	Masahiro Ōkubo	July 19, 2020
Sasuke and Sai's investigation on Kara leads them to the Hidden Rain, a village that has yet to recover from the aftermath of the war. Upon entering an abandoned sewage treatment facility they suspect to be Kara's hideout, the two encounter Garashi Touno, an orphan who seems to have information on the mysterious organization. After leading the two of them around in traps, the boy reveals himself as an Outer for Kara and tries to eliminate the two Leaf ninja along with the facility and himself, but they escape. Sasuke and Sai report to Naruto about the mission, while the members of Kara organization also gather and their leader briefs them on the inconsequential loss of the lab in the Hidden Rain.
158	"The Man Who Disappeared"; Transliteration: "Kieta otoko" (Japanese: 消えた男)	Tazumi Mukaiyama	Masaya Honda	July 26, 2020
With the assistance of Mugino, a jonin who specializes in helping smaller nations deal with post-war conflict, Team 7 heads to the Land of Valleys to aid a woman named Mia in locating her husband Anato, a medical researcher who went missing during a resource – gathering expedition. Victor, the head of the company Anato had worked for, provides them with information and guides them in their mission to track Anato down. They manage to track Anato down after a while, who had already succumbed to the effects of an experiment the company conducted.
159	"The Hashirama Cell"; Transliteration: "Hashirama saibō" (Japanese: 柱間細胞)	Shintarō Inokawa	Atsushi Nishiyama	August 2, 2020
Victor's guards successfully apprehend the berserk Anato, though not before he transfers his condition to Mitsuki, through touch. Mitsuki's condition unexpectedly deteriorates on their journey home, prompting the team to act on Mugino's advice and rush him to an eccentric medical ninja named Yubina. An operation leads to the extraction of what appears to be a piece of wood from Mitsuki's body, evidence of the presence of Hashirama Cell that is to blame for his illness. After learning from Yubina that Mitsuki had only been the latest in a long string of cases, Team 7 decided to chart a course for the rumored origin of the cells – the Land of Silence's black market.
160	"To the Land of Silence"; Transliteration: "Shijima no kuni e" (Japanese: 黙の国へ)	Kaito Asakura	Kyōko Katsuya	August 9, 2020
Upon arriving at the Land of Silence, Team 7 heads to a shop located in the city's most dangerous district hoping to gain some information as to the whereabouts of the Hashirama Cell. The shop owner points them towards a seedy club owned by a group of information brokers called The Ladies, and there they found a man Mugino recognizes as Kirisaki, a rogue medical ninja wanted by the Land of Mist whose presence in the village is due to a summon issued by a mysterious client in need of his knowledge of the Hashirama Cell.
161	"The Castle of Nightmares"; Transliteration: "Akumu no shiro" (Japanese: 悪夢の城)	Mihiro Yamaguchi	Masaya Honda	August 16, 2020
Kirisaki's mysterious client is revealed to be Sakuya, a wealthy woman intend on using the Hashirama Cell to regain her youth and beauty. After passing a test given by Sakuya's faithful butler to determine their skill, Boruto and a disguised Konohamaru manage to gain access into Sakuya's residence of Fushuu Castle and proceed with their plan to retrieved the Hashirama Cell, but there are others who are after it as well.
162	"Escaping the Tightening Net"; Transliteration: "Hōimō o dasshutsu seyo!" (Japanese: 包囲網を脱出せよ!)	Yūta Suzuki	Kō Shigenobu	August 23, 2020
Boruto and the others are involved in a robbery incident at Fushuu Castle and on top of being branded criminals, they are being pursued by a gang from the Land of Silence. Although they're determined to capture the true culprits, the gang keeps attacking and hampering their efforts.
163	"The Pursuers"; Transliteration: "Tsuisekisha-tachi" (Japanese: 追跡者たち)	Yūsuke Onoda	Touko Machida	August 30, 2020
Team 7 and Mugino manage to evade the gang and continue their pursuit of the culprits. But on the way they encounter a squad of skilled ninja and the situation turns explosive. Amidst the tension they learn intel about the culprits, so the team set out in pursuit, but their way is blocked by Deepa.
164	"The Forbidden Jutsu of Death"; Transliteration: "Shi no kinjutsu" (Japanese: 死の禁術)	Ayumu Ono	Masahiro Ōkubo	September 6, 2020
Boruto and the team finally catch up to the real thieves, two ninja brothers from the Land of Haze. Yuga uses a Forbidden Jutsu to summon a monster, and seals it and the team inside a strong barrier. Boruto insists on defeating it and getting out of the barrier. But Mugino argues that unnecessary fighting should be avoided since they don't know how to counter this special jutsu.
165	"The Quadruplets' Duty"; Transliteration: "Yotsugo no shimei" (Japanese: 四つ子の使命)	Michita Shiraishi	Hideto Tanaka	September 13, 2020
Boruto and the others manage to escape Yuuga's barrier, but this time his younger brother Hiruga gets in their way. Like Yuuga, Hiruga will resort to any method to fulfill his mission and uses his jutsu to seal away Boruto and the others. As Boruto tries to break the jutsu, he’s baffled by their rabid fighting style and their willingness to risk their lives.
166	"Death Match"; Transliteration: "Shitō" (Japanese: 死闘)	Kaito Asakura	Atsushi Nishiyama	September 20, 2020
Boruto and the team are determined to reach Asaka, the eldest brother of the Land of Haze Ninja, before Deepa does. They catch up to him, but Deepa arrives soon after and attacks ruthlessly, killing the Haze shinobi. They try to counter, but nothing seems to work. In the midst of their panic, Victor appears. Victor tries to diplomatically ask for the Hashirama Cell, to no avail, so he drops the old cripple act and uses powerful ninjutsu to separate Mugino and Konohamaru from the kids, leaving them for Deepa. Though the two jonin put up a good fight against Victor, they are outmatched in their current weakened and injured state. Meanwhile, Team 7 goes all out against Deepa, but nothing seems to even leave a scratch, and he isn't even taking their strongest attacks seriuosly. After Sarada and Boruto are grievously wounded, Mitsuki goes into Sage Mode, managing to knock Deepa back long enough for him to take the other two and flee.
167	"Their Decision"; Transliteration: "Futari no kakugo" (Japanese: 二人の覚悟)	Noriyuki Abe	Masaya Honda	September 27, 2020
Boruto and Sarada convalesce at the Leaf Hospital while Mitsuki returns to Orochimaru's for treatment, following the critical damage he sustained by using his Sage powers. For Boruto and Sarada, their inability to fight back against Deepa turns from frustration to resolve. Meanwhile, Konohamaru gives the Hokage his report regarding the incident, and in order to investigate the connection with the Kara more thoroughly, he asks that he be allowed to conduct surveillance on Victor's company.
168	"Training Begins!"; Transliteration: "Shugyō kaishi!!" (Japanese: 修業開始!!)	Shintarō Inokawa	Kyōko Katsuya	October 4, 2020
Boruto and Sarada begin intensive training after experiencing defeat. Boruto wants to make his Rasengan even stronger and seeks out Kakashi. Sarada is mentored by her father, Sasuke, in the use of her Sharingan. Meanwhile, Konohamaru and Mugino have been authorized to visit Victor's company in order to investigate his motives.
169	"A Joint Mission With the Sand"; Transliteration: "Suna to no kyōdō sakusen" (Japanese: 砂との共同作戦)	Ōri Yasukawa	Kyōko Katsuya	October 11, 2020
Shikadai, Inojin, and Cho-Cho's Team 10 is assigned to a joint mission with Shinki, Yodo, and Araya from the Hidden Sand. The mission is to find and retrieve an Otsutsuki Puppet that Shikadai had once fought. Team 10 arrives in the Land of Wind and decide to stop at a certain shop. On their way, a man passes them who piques Shikadai's interest. Upon arriving, a chilling scene confronts the trio. Later, when the two squads find the puppet, the previously seen man, who gruesomely slaughtered everyone at the shop arrives. Shikadai realizes, that the man is Deepa, the same one who fought Team 7. Deepa effortlessly defeats all six of them and starts to walk away with Urashiki's puppet, but Shinki uses the last of his strength to destroy the puppet, though Deepa seems unaffected by his failure, even though Victor later berates him for it.
170	"A New Rasengan"; Transliteration: "Atarashii Rasengan" (Japanese: 新しい螺旋丸)	Takashi Asami	Kō Shigenobu	October 18, 2020
Shikadai comes to see Boruto in the midst of training and witnesses his friend's determination to break through his slump. Shikadai, who also experienced Deepa's frightening power, tells Boruto that a rematch with Deepa would be reckless. Boruto explains his real reason for wanting to become stronger, and asks for Shikadai’s help. Meanwhile, Sarada trains with Sasuke to hone her Sharingan, but Sakura worries about her well-being.
171	"The Results of Training"; Transliteration: "Shugyō no seika" (Japanese: 修業の成果)	Masayuki Matsumoto	Masahiro Ōkubo	October 25, 2020
Under Kakashi's watchful eye, Boruto succeeds in powering up his own style of Rasengan and defeats the imprisoned Shojoji in a test fight. Meanwhile, Sasuke and Sakura switch places to train their daughter. With firm resolve, Boruto and Sarada continue their training and begin to see the results of their hard work.
172	"A Signature of Fear"; Transliteration: "Kyōfu no sain" (Japanese: 恐怖のサイン)	Yūsuke Onoda	Atsushi Nishiyama	November 1, 2020
Iwabe, Denki and Metal pay a visit to Boruto after he lands in the hospital from overtraining. There, they meet Nattou Nishiki, a young boy who is also a patient. Rambunctious and brash, Nattou easily manipulates the three into getting him an autograph from a certain ninja feared by everyone!. Nattou asks for a signature by Orochimaru. They visit Orochimaru and meet Suigetsu and get into a fight with him. Orochimaru later comes and gives then an autograph and they give the Shinobi card with Orochimaru's autograph to Nattou. Meanwhile, Mugino and Konohamaru receive authorization to officially investigate Victor's company, and later infiltrate as guards of the Feudal Lord of the Land of Valleys. On the lower levels of the company, Deepa is scolded by Victor, while the latter continues with his experiments, with the help of the doctor, who worked with Ohnoki during the Hidden Stone coup.
173	"The Secret Behind the Underground Room"; Transliteration: "Chikashitsu no himitsu" (Japanese: 地下室の秘密)	Yūta Suzuki	Masaya Honda	November 8, 2020
Konohamaru and Mugino continue keeping their eye on Victor's company. They receive intel that the Feudal Lord of the Land of Valleys will be touring the company, giving them the opportunity to check the inner reaches of the secretive facility. Meanwhile, Boruto and Sarada complete their training and visit the woman who requested their previous mission.
174	"The Revival of the Divine Tree"; Transliteration: "Shinju saisei" (Japanese: 神樹再生)	Masayuki Matsumoto	Hideto Tanaka	November 15, 2020
Konohamaru holds Victor up, while Mugino escapes with the Feudal Lord, though they are followed by Victor's secretary. Luckily for Mugino, Orochimaru and a hooded figure step in, and Orochimaru instantly eliminates the secretary. Boruto and Sarada rush to Victor's research lab where they find a horrifying plant stealing the chakra of the people near it, including the devious doctor, who had manipulated Ohnoki, when he created the Fabrications and Akuta in the Hidden Stone. As Boruto and Sarada work with Konohamaru to try to bring the plant under control, they fall through the collapsed floor, where Deepa awaits.
175	"Beyond the Limits!"; Transliteration: "Genkai no saki e…!!" (Japanese: 限界の先へ…!!)	Kaito Asakura Ōri Yasukawa	Kyōko Katsuya	November 22, 2020
Separated from Boruto and Sarada, Konohamaru battles Victor, though he is at a disadvantage with his broken arm. He is shocked to witness Victor being able to use all five basic Chakra Natures, much like his grandfather, the Third Hokage. When all seems lost for him, Orochimaru steps to save him, revealing that Victor had initially stolen the Hashirama Cell from his lab. Orochimaru defeats Victor with ease. Meanwhile, Boruto and Sarada are trying to defeat Deepa to even the score, but he still proves to be a formidable opponent despite all of their training. When Boruto is cornered, the hooded figure, revealed to be Mitsuki healed up, steps in. Reassembled, Team 7 fights desperately to put an end to Deepa. Sarada's determination to save Boruto triggers the manifestation of the second tomoe in her Sharingan, and she and Mitsuki manage to distract Deepa long enough for Boruto to create his new, Compressed Rasengan. The Rasengan manages to injure Deepa, prompting him to create an entire carbon armor around himself. Before he could attack though, a part of the Divine Tree, having been incinerated by Orochimaru, comes crashing down, troubling the Inner. Boruto charges his Compressed Rasengan again, stating that he'll destroy Deepa, even at the cost of his arm, though Mitsuki wraps his arm around Boruto's, enveloping it with Sage chakra, while Sarada also backs them up with chakra, all of their powers combining into a Super Compressed Rasengan, which annihilates Deepa.
176	"Blockade the A-Un Gate!"; Transliteration: "A・N no mon o fūsa seyo!!" (Japanese: あ・んの門を封鎖せよ!!)	Michita Shiraishi	Masaya Honda	November 29, 2020
Konohamaru and his teammates report their findings that the Kara receives outside assistance from people called Outers, and that these Outers may have covertly infiltrated the Five Great Shinobi Nations. Although Naruto feels that as the Hokage he is responsible for protecting the village, he is having a hard time deciding on a course of action. Victor, having survived being absorbed by the knock-off Divine Tree, reports to the leader of Kara, Jigen. After the leader berates him, Victor concludes, that he must steal the Vessel from Kara, in order to survive.
177	"The Iron Wall's Sensing System"; Transliteration: "Teppeki no kanchi shisutemu" (Japanese: 鉄壁の感知システム)	Noriyuki Abe	Masahiro Ōkubo	December 6, 2020
The Yamanaka Clan, who have been tracking the village's ingoing and outgoing traffic with their advanced sensory abilities, spearheads a plan to create a new sensory system and an operational test is conducted.
178	"Our Fathers' Example"; Transliteration: "Chichi no senaka" (Japanese: 父の背中)	Ayumu Ono	Tōko Machida	December 13, 2020
A memorial service is being held in remembrance of the many fallen from the Fourth Great Ninja War. Shikamaru and Ino reminisce about their fathers who died carrying out their duties until the very end in the hopes of a better future. Meanwhile, Ao, an aide to the Fifth Mizukage Mei, pays a visit to the Village Hidden in Leaves, hoping to thank Katasuke for saving him after the war with Scientific Ninja Tools, but only finds Mugino. After imparting some wisdom to Mugino, and some memories to Shikamaru and Ino about the deaths of their fathers, Ao leaves.
179	"Victor's Scheme"; Transliteration: "Vikuta no inbō" (Japanese: ヴィクタの陰謀)	Takashi Asami	Kō Shigenobu	December 20, 2020
At the beginning Victor plots to steal information about the vessel by fooling Amado so that he can use those information for his own benefit. Jigen's decision to take a plan of Kara involving an item dubbed "the Vessel" to the next stage requires a vehicle that can transfer it undetected. Sensing an opportunity to steal the Vessel so he can further his own interest, Victor offers one of his ships as transport, only to be blindsided when disaster strikes the ship midair.
180	"The Assassin, Mugino"; Transliteration: "Ansatsusha Mugino" (Japanese: 暗殺者ムギノ)	Masayuki Matsumoto	Atsushi Nishiyama	December 27, 2020
Boruto, Sarada and Mitsuki are assigned to carry out Team 7’s missions by themselves until Konohamaru returns from an unexpected assignment. Boruto runs into Mugino in town and ends up going to his home at Mugino's invitation. Mugino reveals his pet turtle to Boruto and, that he was orphaned by war as a child, and forced to become an assassin at the behest of adults. He was pressured into trying to assassinate Hiruzen Sarutobi, the Third Hokage, but the Hokage saved him from a terrible life, and wrote him a letter of recommendation to attend the Leaf Academy, where he'd eventually meet Konohamaru, though unfortunately, only after Orochimaru had already killed the Hokage. Mugino then asks Boruto to take care of his turtle, while he joins Konohamaru on a top-secret mission to investigate a crashed airship at the border of the Land of Fire.
181	"The Vessel"; Transliteration: "Utsuwa" (Japanese: 器)	Yūta Suzuki	Masaya Honda	January 10, 2021
At the meeting of Kara, Victor is berated by Code, Boro and Delta for losing the Vessel, while Jigen orders him to stay out of further operations pertaining to the Vessel, before Koji Kashin offers to retrieve said Vessel by any means necessary. Angered by his treatment, Victor plans to gather all the intel he has and retrieve the Vessel himself, unaware that Koji is right behind him. Before he could ask for forgiveness, Koji incinerates Victor with a Fire Style Jutsu, that can negate even his regeneration abilities, after which he departs for the Land of Fire. At the Kara headquarters, it is revealed, that Jigen has ordered Koji to eliminate Victor for his repeated treacheries, since Amada had regenrated Deepa's head to interrogate him. Citing that they have no further use for him, even though he was an entertaining man, Jigen orders Deepa to be terminated once again. While Konohamaru and Mugino investigated the crash site, the village's inhabitants looked on as Boruto seized the chance to spar with his father revealing some new Jutsus as well as the ability to use Water Style.
182	"Ao" (Japanese: 青)	Yūsuke Onoda	Hideto Tanaka	January 17, 2021
Jigen confides in Amado about a possible traitor within Kara's Inners as it dawns on Konohamaru and Mugino that their mission is a lot more dangerous than either of them anticipated. Mugino is injured at the crash site by puppets augmented with Scientific Ninja Tools. Having gathered enough intel, Konohamaru takes Mugino and runs. Though initially annoyed that his father assigned him and his team with escorting Katasuke to a Scientific Ninja Tool research facility in a town called Ryutan, an encounter with Ao aboard the train heading to their destination gives Boruto a new perspective on Scientific Ninja Tools and their usage. After Team 7 and Katasuke leave, Koji Kashin arrives and hands a briefcase containing weapons to Ao, referring to him as an Outer. He orders Ao, to retrieve the Vessel and terminate anyone who has learned too much.
183	"The Hand"; Transliteration: "Te" (Japanese: 手)	Tazumi Mukaiyama	Kyōko Katsuya	January 24, 2021
Team 7 had managed to escort Katasuke to the scientific ninja tools research facility without incident, but to Boruto's surprise, there is one more thing still left for them to do. Though initially reluctant to help the facility's team of scientists that includes his former classmate Sumire, he helps test the tools they are developing. Boruto finds himself starting to enjoy the process, his stance on scientific ninja tools swayed by how obviously passionate the scientists in the facility are about using them to better people's lives. Their stay there was cut short however, when Naruto called to bestow upon the team an urgent new assignment, to rendezvous with Mugino and Konohamaru.
184	"Puppets"; Transliteration: "Ningyō" (Japanese: 人形)	Seiki Sugawara	Tōko Machida	January 31, 2021
The Hidden Leaf had lost contact with Konohamaru and Mugino. With Katasuke and the ninja hound Chamaru in tow, Team 7 inspects the crash site the two jonin were investigating, hoping to find clues to their whereabouts. Instead they find the mysterious puppets, identified by Katasuke as incredibly advanced Scientific Ninja Tools. After a brief fight in which the scientist's knowledge proved instrumental against their mechanical enemies, the group manage to locate Konohamaru and Mugino in a cave. But their reunion was interrupted by the arrival of an unexpected foe, Ao. The Outer attacks them, prompting the injured Mugino to sacrifice his life in order to collapse the cave on Ao and himself, using Earth Style. Though the others manage to escape, Ao soon digs himself out as well.
185	"Tools"; Transliteration: "Dōgu" (Japanese: 道具)	Michita Shiraishi	Kō Shigenobu	February 7, 2021
Boruto and his friends are shocked at the events that have unfolded, Konohamaru advises them to keep their composure and honor Mugino's sacrifice, by not following hastily in his footsteps and completing the mission. Elsewhere, Ao reports to Koji Kashin, who instructs him to eliminate Team 7 and Katasuke, before leaving.
186	"How You Use It"; Transliteration: "Tsukaikata" (Japanese: 使い方)	Noriyuki Abe Nozomi Fukui	Atsushi Nishiyama	February 14, 2021
Mitsuki, Sarada and Konohamaru corners Ao, while Boruto surprises him and tricks him into taking and using a Scientific Ninja Tool that drains massive amounts of chakra. Just as they seem to have cornered him, Ao reveals his greatest weapon, multiple Mirror Drones, flying disc-like objects that fire powerful projectiles. Konohamaru steps in to save Boruto, and is knocked unconscious. Boruto asks Sarada and Mitsuki to guard Konohamaru and Katasuke, while he uses his quick wit and Paper Bombs to dispatch the Mirror Drones and defeat Ao by himself. Instead of killing him and avenging Mugino however, Boruto makes him realize the consequences of his actions, leaving him to stare at the sky in a resolute state. As Team 7 would celebrate, Ao notices Koji Kashin standing atop the ruins right above him, alerting the Leaf ninja.
187	"Karma"; Transliteration: "Kāma" (Japanese: 楔(カーマ))	Kim Min-sun	Kyōko Katsuya	February 21, 2021
Koji Kashin kills Ao for his failure and overwhelms Team 7, using jutsu such as the Rasengan, which shocks them all. When all seems lost for Konohamaru, the seal on Boruto's arm activates and absorbs Koji's jutsu. Impressed with Boruto, Koji leaves. While walking back to the Leaf following their battle, Team 7 discovers an unconscious kid with the same marking on his hand as Boruto's. Meanwhile, Delta and Code become suspicious of Koji and Boro's intentions within Kara.
188	"Awakening"; Transliteration: "Mezame" (Japanese: 目覚め)	Takashi Asami	Masahiro Ōkubo	February 28, 2021
Years ago, a boy named Kawaki was adopted into Kara by Jigen, where he received training from an Outer named Garou. In the present, Delta and Garou go to Koji's location, with Jigen's permission. Delta discovers that Boruto has a Karma seal too, while Garou ambushes the awakened Kawaki.
189	"Resonance"; Transliteration: "Kyōmei" (Japanese: 共鳴)	Pierrot	Pierrot	March 7, 2021
Garou engages Kawaki and is winning, until Kawaki's Karma seal activates, after which Kawaki quickly dispatches the Outer with an explosion, while Boruto's activated seal protects the team from the attack. Kawaki remains hostile towards them, but his body overheats before he could do anything. Konohamaru decides to take Kawaki into custody, while Delta reluctantly adheres to Koji's decision to gather more intel first, instead of retrieving the Vessel.
190	"Escape"; Transliteration: "Dassō" (Japanese: 脱走)	Masayuki Matsumoto	Hideto Tanaka	March 14, 2021
Team 7 and Katasuke return to the Advanced Technology Lab with Kawaki. Konohamaru has returned to the village to report on the mission and on Mugino's demise. Naruto, concerned about the relationship between Kawaki and Kara, decides to go to the lab with Sai. Sumire accidentally reveals to Kawaki, that Ninja Tools are being developed at the lab, so Kawaki uses one on them and escapes, after Sumire and Nue fail to stop him.
191	"Stray Dog"; Transliteration: "Norainu" (Japanese: 野良犬)	Yūsuke Onoda	Masaya Honda	March 21, 2021
Kawaki, still injured, runs wild in Ryutan City, while Sumire, Team 7 and the Police Force are on the hunt. He runs into a stray dog, starving like him. They help each other out with food, while Sumire arrives and patches them up as a peace offering. Team 7 and the Police Force surrounds him soon after, so Kawaki lashes out at Sumire, thinking she was stalling him. He starts to rampage on the streets, but Naruto and Sai arrive. Naruto uses his power to fend off Kawaki's attack and once he passes out, declares that the boy will come live with him, under better guidance.
192	"The Past"; Transliteration: "Kako" (Japanese: 過去)	Masayuki Kōda	Masaya Honda	March 28, 2021
As a child, Kawaki chopped wood all day to have enough money to buy liquor for his abusive, alcoholic father. A goldfish vendor new to the village tried befriending him. Enduring his father's abuse, Kawaki ventured out each day, only once, some bullies picked on him, but the vendor came to his rescue and wiped the blood off the injured boy's face. The Inner, Delta walked by and discovered the boy's blood on the rag. Kawaki got in trouble with his father, for losing the liquor that day, however that same night, Jigen came to his house and bought Kawaki from his father, who couldn't care less about the boy. Jigen took Kawaki with him, but the goldfish vendor, revealing himself to be a human trafficker, who wanted to sell Kawaki himself, stands in their way. Jigen sends the boy ahead, only to come out unscathed moments later. Soon after, the two arrive at the Kara hideout, where they are greeted by Amado, who is preparing the lab for Kawaki's arrival. In the present, Kawaki is greeted in the Leaf hospital by Naruto.
193	"Coexistence"; Transliteration: "Dōkyo" (Japanese: 同居)	Natsumi Yasue	Atsushi Nishiyama	April 4, 2021
Shikamaru stops Kawaki from escaping the hospital, and disagrees with Naruto about placing the boy in his own house. During the Five Kage Summit, Gaara and Darui support Naruto's decision to keep Kawaki in his protection from Kara. Konohamaru and Boruto visit Mugino's home, and the former takes custody of his pet turtle and his letter from the Third Hokage. Kawaki tries to run again, but Naruto always ends up in front of him, so he relents. Tensions arise, when the whole family arrives, and Kawaki accidentally breaks the vase Himawari made for Hinata's birthday. Seeing her cry, the boy apologizes and finally introduces himself as Kawaki.
194	"The Uzumaki Household"; Transliteration: "Uzumaki-ke" (Japanese: うずまき家)	Shigetaka Ikeda	Kyōko Katsuya	April 11, 2021
Kawaki starts living in the Uzumaki household, and at first he’s bewildered by their peaceful everyday life. Eventually he’s put to ease by the cheerful and welcoming atmosphere of the Uzumakis. Meanwhile, Boruto is furious that Kawaki has broken a vase that his little sister had made for their mother, fanning the flames between them. As a fellow wielder of the Karma, Kawaki makes a proposal. Boruto and Kawaki reveal to each other how they got their Karma seals, while Naruto eavesdrops on them. After Boruto goes out to train with Sarada and Mitsuki, Naruto offers to show Kawaki around the Village Hidden in Leaves.
195	"A Vase"; Transliteration: "Kabin" (Japanese: 花瓶)	Michita Shiraishi	Tōko Machida	April 18, 2021
Naruto shows Kawaki around the village and they encounter Sarada and Cho-Cho buying taiyaki at a store. Naruto treats the kids with their preferred flavors, and Kawaki really likes the chocolate one. Joined by Sarada, they continue looking for a replacement vase. A child bumps into Kawaki and he scares the boy, reasoning that he "taught him a life lesson". They go by Ino's shop, where Naruto secretly orders her to keep the Sensory Unit vigilant. Kawaki picks out a vase, after having nightmarish flashback. Sarada gives Kawaki some advice on being nicer and leaves, with Naruto stating after, that they became friends. Arriving home, Kawaki gives the vase to Himawari, while Boruto slips glue into Kawaki's hand, to simply fix the broken vase. On the outskirts of the village, Delta and Koji arrive. The latter warns the former of the Yamanaka Clan's security measures, stating that previously unregistered chakra would be immediately noticed and tells her to stay behind, before easily entering by himself.
196	"A Binding Force"; Transliteration: "Tsunagu Chikara" (Japanese: 繋ぐ力)	Yūta Suzuki	Kō Shigenobu	April 25, 2021
Koji begins scouring the Leaf for Kawaki, using a Toad Summoning, leaving the impatient Delta behind. Meanwhile, Sarada and Mitsuki come by to visit Boruto and Kawaki, with Mitsuki being suspicious about Kawaki's intentions and the purpose of the Karma seal. Naruto invites Boruto for another training match, with Himawari, Mitsuki, Sarada and Kawaki as spectators. Kawaki activates his Karma, when Boruto can't activate it by himself, and after a tenuous, but fun battle, Boruto loses. Inspired by Boruto's growth in power, Sarada asks Sasuke to teach him the Chidori. Remembering how Jigen used to "train" him by beating him, Kawaki seeks Naruto's counsel, after which the latter tells him about his past hardships and his rivalry, which inspired him to become stronger. Kawaki decides to fix the broken vase, just when Koji's Toad finds him.
197	"Delta"; Transliteration: "Deruta" (Japanese: デルタ)	Kim Min-sun	Masahiro Ōkubo	May 2, 2021
Boruto accepts Kawaki's offer to learn about the Karma through training and they go out into the woods with Himawari and Naruto, closely followed by Koji's toad. Delta's increasingly impatient and bloodthirsty attitude makes her send out her surveillance drone to find Kawaki, which is undetectable, since it doesn't use chakra. Meanwhile, Code agrees to Amado's request to bring in Boro for maintenance, while Jigen's recuperating. After the training, Delta's drone pinpoints the location of Kawaki. She then flies into the village, thus alerting the Yamanaka barrier system, so Ino warns Naruto of her impending arrival. Naruto advises the kids to leave, but it is too late, as Delta lands in front of them.
198	"Monsters"; Transliteration: "Bakemon" (Japanese: 怪物(バケモン))	Nozomi Fukui	Hideto Tanaka	May 9, 2021
Delta engages Naruto in battle, while the kids stand back. After an initial taijutsu flurry, Delta reveals her legs and eyes are Scientific Ninja Tools, before using said legs to pierce the Hokage's abdomen. Thinking she'd lower her guard while he's down, Naruto pretends to be hurt, but she sees through his tricks. Naruto activates his Nine Tails Cloak and engages her fiercely, trying to lead her away from the kids, while Kawaki prevents Boruto from butting in. Becoming increasingly more desperate at her inability to hurt Naruto, Delta instead targets Himawari, forcing Naruto into a trap. Naruto shields his daughter from a possibly fatal attack, but luckily Kawaki takes the blast for both of them, at the cost of his right arm.
199	"Overload"; Transliteration: "Ōbārōdo" (Japanese: オーバーロード)	Masayuki Matsumoto	Tōko Machida	May 16, 2021
Naruto is angered by how Delta has hurt Kawaki and goes on the offensive. After a flurry of taijutsu attacks, during which Delta is continuously getting pummelled, she is knocked down. As The Hokage approaches her, she tries to land a killshot with her eye lasers, but Naruto blocks it out with a Massive Rasengan, which she proceeds to start absorbing. However, the massive and continuous amount of chakra overloads her body, and her absorbing eye malfunctions. Taking advantage of this, Naruto creates a Supermassive Rasengan and obliterates her as the kids cheer him on. Naruto says, that he let her live, so they could interrogate her, but just as Kawaki objects to that, her body self-destructs in a massive explosion, though her surveillance drone flies off. Koji, who was also watching the battle, is impressed with Naruto. Elsewhere, in a village struck by plague and poverty, Boro and his cult show up to save and indoctrinate the populace. Back at his cultist temple, Code shows up and demands Boro to come in for maintenance, as per Amado's orders. Meanwhile, Jigen has finished healing up and Amado reports of Delta and Koji's failure at bringing the Vessel back, as well as his own failure to find the traitor among Kara.
200	"Becoming a Student"; Transliteration: "Deshiiri" (Japanese: 弟子入り)	Yūsuke Onoda	Kyōko Katsuya	May 23, 2021
Katasuke gives Kawaki one of Naruto's spare prosthetic arms, infused with chakra. Amado doesn't find anything during Boro's maintenance as Delta's drone arrives and connects to a machine that releases another body for Delta out of the pod. Boro and Code ridicule her for losing while she rants about Naruto and Kawaki protecting each other. Jigen arrives and tries to calm the Inners, but Delta reveals that Koji is still hiding in Konoha and that Boruto also has a Karma. Shikamaru assigns Konohamaru to watch over Kawaki, who decides to learn ninjutsu from Naruto. Boro overhears Code and Amado talking and finds out about the investigation, but seems uninterested in finding the traitor. Meanwhile, Sasuke teaches Sarada the basics of the Chidori before going on a mission with Sai. Team 7 and Kawaki meet up in the afternoon and Boruto buys Ninja Cards for Kawaki and himself. Kawaki gets a card of Minato Namikaze and trades it with Boruto for a Naruto card. Later, Kawaki fixes the broken vase but is still missing a piece. He tries to leave while asleeping Naruto to go find it but he is stopped by Kurama.
201	"Empty Tears"; Transliteration: "Karappo no Namida" (Japanese: 空っぽの涙)	Takeshi Yoshimoto	Atsushi Nishiyama	May 30, 2021
Kurama reveals to Kawaki that the Five Kage tasked him with watching the boy while Naruto sleeps and tells him of Naruto's life, showing how similar they are. The next day, he fights through a traumatic memory of Jigen and succeeds in climbing a tree using chraka. He also asks Naruto to teach him the Shadow Clone Jutsu. Later, Team 7 decides to get back into training, but Kawaki wants to do something back home. The others relent, but not before Boruto tells Kawaki that he's not alone anymore. Kawaki finally opens up and starts talking about Jigen and how they need to worry about him. In the afternoon, Sarada continues training to use the Chidori. Meanwhile, Sai confirms to Shikamaru of Jigen's identity as the leader of Kara, based on the data Konohamaru had retrieved. Shikamaru, still distrustful of Kawaki, is relieved to learn that Sai had already sent Sasuke to investigate the coordinates gathered from the airship, before revealing it is in another dimension. Sasuke arrives in the separate dimension at an Ōtsutsuki shrine. Meanwhile, Boro addresses his cult, further mesmerizing them with the idea of Ōtsutsuki saviors who used Infinite Tsukuyomi to deliver mankind to salvation.
202	"The Cult"; Transliteration: "Kyōdan" (Japanese: 教団)	Seiki Sugawara	Masaya Honda	June 6, 2021
Boro retrieves a hidden item from the airship, raising his suspicions about Koji, that he had left it there previously. Sasuke investigates the Ōtsutsuki shrine and activates symbols on the wall that projects holographic displays placed in pairs of Momoshiki and Kinshiki, and Kaguya and another unknown Ōtsutsuki. After Boro delivers a speech to his cult, he reveals to them that there is still hope because he has met another Ōtsutsuki "god" who will save them. After his speech, Inori's brother tries to bring her back from Boro, claiming that the Inner is a fraud. Boro reveals his regeneration ability to the assailant and after Inori leaves on Boro's orders, he kills her brother. As Sasuke ponders on the unknown Ōtsutsuki's identity, he hears monstrous grovelling beneath the hologram platform and discovers an immobilised Ten-Tails. Before he could do anything, Jigen arrives and proceeds to siphon chakra from the creature, causing his Karma to activate. As his body begins to turn into the Ōtsutsuki partnered with Kaguya, Jigen voices his desire to visit the two Vessels before disappearing.
203	"Surprise Attack!"; Transliteration: "Kyūshū...!!" (Japanese: 急襲…!!)	Shigetaka Ikeda	Kō Shigenobu	June 13, 2021
Naruto wakes up and finds Kawaki searching for the vase's last piece. He tries to dissuade him from searching any further though to no avail. Koji surveys Kawaki and wonders why Jigen hasn't made a move. While training with Mitsuki, Boruto's Karma suddenly activates and hurries back home. Meanwhile, Sarada buys flowers from Ino's shop and as she leaves, Ino detects a massive chakra entering Konoha. Kawaki's Karma activates and Jigen steps out from the portal it created, shocking Naruto and Koji, who realized the mission was a ruse to test his loyalty. Jigen apologizes for entering with shoes on and tells Naruto that he'll leave if Kawaki comes with him. Naruto refuses, so Jigen surprises him with chakra rods and quickly dispatches the jonin protecting the house. Kurama helps Naruto so that he can battle Jigen but is still at huge disadvantage due to being in the village. When Jigen begins charging an attack that would claim many lives, Kawaki gives himself up but Naruto refuses to let him go. Annoyed, Jigen warp aways with Naruto to Kara's dimension and decides to end him before Sasuke attacks Jigen, who states that he'll wipe them both out.
204	"He's Bad News"; Transliteration: "Yabai Yarō" (Japanese: ヤバイ野郎)	Takeru Ogiwara	Masahiro Ōkubo	June 20, 2021
Team 7 returns to the Uzumaki House and Kawaki reveals that Jigen took Naruto. Ino contacts Shikamaru and informs him of the situation. As Jigen corners them, Naruto uses the Multi-Shadow Clone to cover for Sasuke while he recovers and figures out Jigen's ability who decides to eliminate Sasuke first. The duo power up and try to overwhelm Jigen, even cornering him for a moment in which he teleports away. Annoyed, Jigen sprouts his horn from the Karma, prompting Sasuke to reveal that he knows that Jigen is an Ōtsutsuki and that he has a juvenile Ten Tails. After keeping Jigen on the defensive for a while, they are surprised when he manages to knock them out of their respective modes and immobilised them. As Jigen prepares to kill Sasuke first, the black spot on his abdomen starts to crack and Sasuke teleports back to Konoha, collapsing in front of Sakura. Jigen seals Naruto away and his abdomen cracks even more. A voice inside him states that Jigen's pathetic body is at its limit, before revealing himself to be Isshiki Ōtsutsuki, surprising Koji. Back at the Uzumaki house, Kawaki's arm deactivates as he holds a picture of Naruto.
205	"Proof"; Transliteration: "Shōmei" (Japanese: 証明)	Michita Shiraishi	Atsushi Nishiyama	June 27, 2021
As Team 7 and Kawaki are horrified by the thought of Naruto's death, Shikamaru arrive at the Uzumaki house and uses Shadow Paralysis to bind Kawaki's movements. Several Jonin erect a barrier around the house while Shikamaru questions Kawaki about Jigen's sudden arrival and disappearance with Naruto. Amado runs maintenance on Jigen's body, revealing he's at his limit, however, Jigen retorts that Kawaki and Boruto's Karma have developed. Code and Delta inquire about their next move and Jigen reveals they will retrieve the two Vessels once he's healed. He also instructs Code to guard the Ten Tails and Boro to guard the sealed Naruto. Boro contacts Koji and reveals his suspicions, even having one of his toads in his possession. Koji claims that Jigen ordered him to survey the airship and that if he were a traitor, he would've been eliminated. Shikamaru reveals that Sasuke returned in critical condition and that he still doesn't trust Kawaki. However, Kawaki's arm reactivates, showing that Naruto is still alive and uses his Karma together with Boruto's to create a portal to Kara's dimension. Team 7 enters the portal while Kawaki reassures Shikamaru before entering as well.
206	"The New Team Seven"; Transliteration: "Shinsei Dai Nana-han" (Japanese: 新生第七班)	Sōta Yokote	Hideto Tanaka	July 4, 2021
Team 7 and Kawaki arrive in Kara's dimension where they run into Boro, who reminisces with Kawaki before taunting them with the sealed bowl Naruto is in and tosses it at them. He then attacks with Lava Style though Kawaki and Boruto absorb it using their Karmas. When his Karma amplifies his Rasengan, Boruto lands a hit, however, Boro regenerates. Kawaki and Boruto soon fall over and Boro reveals his Dark Cloud which Karma cannot absorb. Boro reveals to Boruto that his existence has proven useful for Kara due to being Momoshiki's Vessel. Mitsuki distracts Boro lor Sarada and him to retreat with Kawaki and Boruto. A dazed Kawaki surmises that Karma can only absorb ninjutsu created from chakra. Realizing that they need someone who can lead them best, they appoint Sarada as captain and she confronts Boro alone while the others wait for her signal. Boro reveals that he uses Dark Cloud to poison villages and save them to recruit into his cult. He surrounds Sarada and grabs her before she breaks free and counters with a Fireball Jutsu. Kawaki and Boruto resonate their Karmas to power Boruto's massive Rasengan to obliterate Boro's top half though he regenerates.
207	"Regeneration"; Transliteration: "Saisei" (Japanese: 再生)	Ayumu Ono	Kyōko Katsuya	July 11, 2021
Boro boasts about becoming a being above humans and realizes Mitsuki made everyone immune to his poison. Sarada warns everyone to be careful as they surround Boro, who surprises them by charging for the sealed Naruto. Kawaki quickly intercepts Boro and protects Naruto despite being ambushed with explosives. Mitsuki and Boruto tag team Boro while Kawaki asks Sarada to stay behind with him. After coming up with a plan, Sarada distracts Boro as well so that Mitsuki can immobilize him. Kawaki activates his Karma and blasts him away, however Boro regenerates once more. Boruto is disheartened because Boro keeps healing but Kawaki tells him and Mitsuki he has a plan as Sarada figured out how to neutralize Boro's Scientific Ninja Tool. While everyone distracts Boro, Sarada destroys Boro's core using the Chidori which causes his body to destabilize and grow into a giant blob. Now that Boro can no longer fight, Team 7 prioritizes rescuing Naruto by using Boruto and Kawaki's Karmas to open a portal through the seal and release him. However, Boro regains control of his body and proceeds to crush Team 7 one-by-one before beating Boruto into the ground until his Karma activates, causing Momoshiki to manifest.
208	"Momoshiki's Manifestation"; Transliteration: "Momoshiki Kengen" (Japanese: モモシキ顕現)	Ryūta Yamamoto	Tōko Machida	July 18, 2021
Momoshiki destroys Boro's arms and creates an enormous Rasengan using Naruto's chraka to kill him. He then relinquishes control of Boruto's body which falls to the ground. Two days later, Naruto awakens from his coma and Boruto runs off to tell Kawaki. Sasuke is relieved by Sakura's news and Shikamaru holds a temporary meeting with Naruto, Sasuke, Sai, and Team 7. They review the events of Naruto's rescue and everything they know about the Inners. Sasuke reveals what he found in Kara's dimension while Boruto commends Sarada. While Kawaki and Boruto enjoy some downtime with Inojin and Shikadai, Sarada tells Sasuke that Boruto easily obliterated Boro while their team efforts proved to be ineffective. Once Mitsuki and Sarada both affirm that Boruto had grown horns and Boro addressed him as a Vessel for Momoshiki, Sasuke connects the dots and theorizes that Jigen is just a Vessel as well. Sumire interrupts the boys' card game and asks Kawaki to return to bed, where she cares for him. Elsewhere, Naruto tells Shikamaru to lay off Kawaki but Shikamaru calls his naïvety out and remains skeptical of the boy.

== Home media release ==
=== Japanese ===
Aniplex (Japan, Region 2)
DVD	Release date	Discs	Episodes	DVD-BOX	Release date	Discs	Episodes
39	December 9, 2020	1	157–160	9	April 7, 2021	5	157–176
40	January 13, 2021	1	161–164	9	April 7, 2021	5	157–176
41	February 3, 2021	1	165–168	9	April 7, 2021	5	157–176
42	March 3, 2021	1	169–172	9	April 7, 2021	5	157–176
43	April 7, 2021	1	173–176	9	April 7, 2021	5	157–176
44	May 12, 2021	1	177–180	10	August 4, 2021	4	177–189
45	June 2, 2021	1	181–183	10	August 4, 2021	4	177–189
46	July 7, 2021	1	184–186	10	August 4, 2021	4	177–189
47	August 4, 2021	1	187–189	10	August 4, 2021	4	177–189
48	September 8, 2021	1	190–192	11	December 1, 2021	4	190–205
49	October 6, 2021	1	193–197	11	December 1, 2021	4	190–205
50	November 3, 2021	1	198–201	11	December 1, 2021	4	190–205
51	December 1, 2021	1	202–205	11	December 1, 2021	4	190–205
52	January 12, 2022	1	206–208	12	April 6, 2022	4	206–220

=== English ===
Viz Media (North America, Region A / 1)
Set	Release date	Discs	Episodes	Ref.
12	May 17, 2022	3	156–176	
13	September 6, 2022	2	177–189	
14	January 10, 2023	3	190–210	

Madman Entertainment (Australia and New Zealand, Region B / 4)
Part	Release date	Discs	Episodes	Ref.
12	August 3, 2022	3	156–176	
13	March 8, 2023	2	177–189	
