= Aoi Tori =

Single by Fujifabric
- Released: January 10, 2007
- Genre: Alternative rock
- Length: 11:08
- Label: Toshiba-EMI
- Songwriter(s): Masahiko Shimura

Fujifabric singles chronology
"Akaneiro no Yūhi" (2005)	"Aoi Tori" (2007)	"Surfer King" (2007)

"Aoi Tori" (蒼い鳥) is Fujifabric's 7th single. The singles title track was featured as the ending theme in the 2007 film Nightmare Detective.

== Track listing ==
1. "Aoi Tori" (蒼い鳥)
2. "Tōkyō Enjō" (東京炎上)

== Chart positions ==
Chart (2007)	Peak position
Japan Oricon Singles Chart	9
