= Surfer King =

Single by Fujifabric
- Released: June 6, 2007
- Genre: Alternative rock, Surf rock
- Length: 8:49
- Label: Capitol Records

Fujifabric singles chronology
| "Aoi Tori" (2007) | "Surfer King" (2007) | "Passion Fruit" (2007) |

"Surfer King" is Fujifabric's 8th single. The single's title track features Masahiko Kitahara, Nargo, and Gamou from Tokyo Ska Paradise Orchestra, and marks Fujifabric's first collaboration.

== Track listing ==
1. Surfer King
2. Day Dripper

== Chart positions ==
| Chart (2007) | Peak position | Time in chart |
|---|---|---|
| Japan Oricon Singles Chart | 23 | N/A |
