= Teen language =

Teen language may refer to:

- the speech patterns of teenagers
- the Lorhon language of Côte d'Ivoire
- the extinct Thiin language of Australia
