= Ten dollar bill =

A ten dollar bill or ten dollar note is a banknote denominated with a value of ten dollars and represents a form of currency.

Examples of ten-dollar bills include:

- Australian ten-dollar note
- Canadian ten-dollar bill
- Hong Kong ten-dollar note
- New Zealand ten-dollar note
- United States ten-dollar bill

Ten dollar bill may also refer to:

- Ten Dollar Bill (Roy Lichtenstein drawing)
