= Wakamono no Subete =

Single by Fujifabric
- Released: November 7, 2007
- Genre: Alternative rock, Power pop
- Length: 12:20
- Label: Capitol Records

Fujifabric singles chronology
"Passion Fruit" (2007)	"Wakamono no Subete" (2007)	"Sugar!!" (2009)

"Wakamono no Subete" was released on November 7, 2007 and is Fujifabric's 10th single.

== Track listing ==
1. Wakamono no Subete (若者のすべて)
2. Serenade (セレナーデ)
3. Kuma no Wakusei (熊の惑星)

== Chart positions ==
Chart (2007)	Peak position	Time in chart
Japan Oricon	# 30	N/A
