= Passion Fruit (song) =

Single by Fujifabric
- Released: September 5, 2007
- Genre: Alternative rock, power pop
- Length: 7:21 (normal edition)
- Label: Capitol

Fujifabric singles chronology
"Surfer King" (2007)	"Passion Fruit" (2007)	"Wakamono no Subete" (2007)

"Passion Fruit" is a 2007 Japanese song by Fujifabric and the group's ninth single. The single was released in two versions: a normal version and a limited edition first press version of 10,000 copies which featured the extra song "Cheese Burger", linked to a McDonald's Japan promotion. The song begins "夢の中で あやかしパッション" (yume no naka de ayakashi passhon..) "In a dream, awkward passion...".

== Track listing ==
1. "Passion Fruit"
2. "Spider to Ballerina" (スパイダーとバレリーナ)
3. "Cheese Burger" (limited edition only)

== Chart positions ==
Chart (2007)	Peak position
Japan (Oricon)	26
