= Fujifabric =

Japanese rock band

- Origin: Yamanashi, Japan
- Genres: Alternative rock, indie rock, power pop
- Years active: 2000–present
- Labels: Song-Crux (2001–2004); EMI Music Japan (2004–2009); Capitol Music; Sony Music Associated Records (2010–present)
- Members: Sōichirō Yamauchi (vocals, guitar); Daisuke Kanazawa (keyboards); Shinichi Katō (bass); Toshiki Hata (support drums)
- Past members: Masahiko Shimura (vocals, guitar) (deceased); Yūichi Katō (bass, 2000–2002); Akira Hagiwara (guitar, 2000–2002); Sachiko Tadokoro (keyboards, 2000–2002); Takayuki Watanabe (drums, 2000–2004); Fusafumi Adachi (drums, 2004–2006)
- Website: http://www.fujifabric.com

Fujifabric (Japanese: フジファブリック, Hepburn: Fujifaburikku) is a Japanese rock band formed in 2000. While their music can be mostly categorized as alternative rock or power pop, their music usually consists of an eclectic mix of genres, including jazz, disco and progressive rock.

== Name origin ==
Before the band made their formal debut they were originally known as Fuji Fabric (富士ファブリック, Fuji Faburikku), in homage to the textile company which former band drummer, Takayuki Watanabe's, father owned. Just before moving to Tokyo and reforming the band, the spelling was changed to Fujifabric (フジファブリック, Fujifaburikku).

== History ==
=== Formation and indie period (2000–2004) ===
Originally a cover band consisting of several junior high school friends, Fujifabric was founded by Masahiko Shimura and Takayuki Watanabe. After graduating from high school, the Fujiyoshida, Yamanashi natives began to take their musical interests more seriously and moved to Tokyo, and recruited Sachiko Tadokoro, Yūichi Katō and Akira Hagiwara for the band.

The first Fujifabric performance was in October 2001 at Club Eggsite (now known as Shibuya Eggman). After playing several successful club gigs, Fujifabric was signed to Song-Crux. Before the release of their debut mini-album, À la carte guitarist Akira Hagiwara and bassist Yūichi Katō left the band, and keyboardist Sachiko Tadokoro soon followed, leaving Shimura and Watanabe. Daisuke Kanazawa and Shinichi Katō were recruited into the band and in June 2003 the band released their second mini-album À la mode.

=== Major albums and hiatus (2004–2010) ===
The band soon caught the attention of several major record labels and a bidding war over the band ensued; finally in 2004 Fujifabric was signed to Toshiba-EMI and Sōichirō Yamauchi was brought into the band as lead guitarist. In January 2004 original founding member Takayuki Watanabe left the band due to creative differences; consequently Fusafumi Adachi joined and took over as drummer. In February 2004 Fujifabric completed the "À la.." trilogy and released their first major release, EP À la molto.

Fujifabric released their first full (and self-titled) studio album on November 10, 2004. Fujifabric peaked at No. 17 on Japan's Oricon Chart.

In 2005 the band released three more singles including the popular "Ginga" and "Akaneiro no Yūhi", the latter which featured the song "Shinkirō" and was used as the ending theme in the film Scrap Heaven. In November 2005, Fujifabric released their second full album Fab Fox which went on to peak at No. 8 on the Oricon charts, selling 13,152 units in its first week.

After a two-year hiatus, Fujifabric released the single "Aoi Tori", which peaked at No. 9 on the Oricon Chart and was the ending theme of the film Nightmare Detective. The band's subsequent single "Surfer King", featured Masahiko Kitahara, Nargo, and Gamo of Tokyo Ska Paradise Orchestra, and marked Fujifabric's first collaboration. The tracks were included on Fujifabric's third studio album, Teenager. The album came out on January 3, 2008, and peaked at No. 11. Their second most recent single, entitled "Sugar!!" was used as the theme music for J-Sports' Nippon Professional Baseball broadcasts for the 2010 season.

On December 24, 2009, vocalist Masahiko Shimura died due to unknown causes. His final album as lead vocalist, titled Music, was released on July 28, 2010.

=== Memorial concert, label change, and new vocalist (2010–present) ===
Despite the death of their lead singer, the band continued with the remaining three members. In 2010, the band switched labels from EMI Music Japan to Sony Music Associated Records. The three remaining members performed a memorial concert in August 2010, Fujifabric Presents Fuji Fuji Fuji Q, which featured many friends of the band substituting as lead vocalist including Quruli, Kishidan, Puffy, Tamio Okuda, Polysics, and more. The DVD and Blu-ray from this concert was released on July 20, 2011. In August 2011, they announced that their sixth album, titled Star, would be released September 21 with lead guitarist Sōichirō Yamauchi as the new vocalist.

The lead track from their twelfth single, "Tsuredure Monochrome / Ryūsenkei" (徒然モノクローム / 流線形, Tsuredure Monokurōmu / Ryūsenkei), released on May 15, 2012, was the opening song for the anime Tsuritama. The limited edition of this single includes a live DVD featuring the current lineup of Fujifabric performing tracks from Star.

Their latest album, Voyager, was released on March 6, 2013. One of the singles promoting the album, "Small World", was used as the 4th opening to the anime Space Brothers.

In 2014 they released two songs that were featured in anime: "Life" for the second season of Silver Spoon and "Blue" for the anime Blue Spring Ride.

On 3rd of July 2024, the band announced that they would go on an indefinite hiatus from February 2025.

== Members ==
=== Current ===
Daisuke Kanazawa (金澤ダイスケ, Kanazawa Daisuke; born February 9, 1980 in Ibaraki, Japan) joined the band in January 2003, replacing the former keyboardist.

Shinichi Katō (加藤慎一, Katō Shinichi; born August 2, 1980 in Ishikawa, Japan) joined the band at the same time as Kanazawa, in January 2003. He is the bassist of the band.

Sōichirō Yamauchi (山内総一郎, Yamauchi Sōichirō; born October 25, 1981 in Osaka, Japan) joined Fujifabric in January 2004 as lead guitarist, and took over lead vocals following Shimura's death. His wife is actress Kami Hiraiwa, they got married on January 1, 2020. Their first child was born in 2023.

=== Former ===
Masahiko Shimura (志村正彦, Shimura Masahiko; born July 10, 1980 in Yamanashi, Japan) was the only remaining original member of Fujifabric, he was the lyricist, lead vocalist, and rhythm guitarist of the group. He died on December 24, 2009, of an unknown ailment.

Fusafumi Adachi (足立房文, Adachi Fusafumi; born May 14, 1980 in Adachi-ku, Tokyo, Japan) joined Fujifabric in January 2004 as a drummer. He was an employee of Ringo Shiina's individual office kuronekodow before joining. He left the band on March 27, 2006, and is now front man for his band "Marvelous."

=== Support ===
Hiroshi Kido (城戸紘志, Kido Hiroshi; born July 27, 1981 in Kyoto, Japan) - drummer for Kenichi Asai's JUDE and unkie

Toshiki Hata (畑利樹, Hata Toshiki; born October 5, 1976 in Shimane, Japan) - drummer for Tokyo Jihen

Ryōta Sakakibara (榊原良太, Sakakibara Ryōta; born in Kyoto, Japan)

== Discography ==
=== Studio albums ===
- Fujifabric (2004)
- Fab Fox (2005)
- Teenager (2008)
- Chronicle (2009)
- Music (2010)
- Star (2011)
- Voyager (2013)
- Life (2014)
- Stand!! (2016)
- F (2019)
- I Love You (2021)

=== Mini albums ===
- À la carte (2002)
- À la mode (2003)
- À la molto (2004)

=== Compilations ===
- Singles 2004-2009 (2010)

=== Singles ===
- "Sakura no Kisetsu" (2004)
- "Kagerō" (2004)
- "Akakiiro no Kinmokusei" (2004)
- "Ginga" (2005)
- "Niji" (2005)
- "Akaneiro no Yūhi" (2005)
- "Yaon Live Vol. 1" (2006, digital download)
- "Yaon Live Vol. 2" (2006, digital download)
- "Aoi Tori" (2007)
- "Surfer King" (2007)
- "Passion Fruit" (2007)
- "Wakamono no Subete" (2007)
- "Sugar!!" (2009)
- "Tsuredure Monochrome / Ryūsenkei" (2012)
- "Light Flight" (2012)
- "Small World" (2013)
- "Life" (2014)
- "Blue/Wired" (2014)
- "Polaris" (2016)
- "Super!!" (2016)
- "Golden Time" (2019)
- "Rakuen (Fujifabric single)" (2021)
