= Boruto: Naruto Next Generations episodes 209–260 =

- Series 5
- Cover of the twelfth home media box set release of the series featuring Naruto Uzumaki in Baryon Mode.
- No. of episodes: 52

Release
- Original network: TV Tokyo
- Original release: August 1, 2021 – July 31, 2022

Series chronology
- ← Previous; List 4 (#157–208) Next → List 6 (#261–293)

Boruto: Naruto Next Generations is a Japanese anime series based on the manga series of the same name and is a spin-off and sequel to Masashi Kishimoto's Naruto. It is produced by Pierrot and broadcast on TV Tokyo. The anime is directed by Masayuki Kōda (episodes 105–281) and is written by Masaya Honda ( from episode 67 onwards). Former manga writer Ukyō Kodachi supervised the story until episode 216.

Boruto follows the exploits of Naruto Uzumaki's son Boruto and his comrades from the Hidden Leaf Village's ninja academy as they seek their own paths in life. Despite being based on the manga, the anime also explores original storylines and adaptations of the spin-off manga, Naruto: The Seventh Hokage and the Scarlet Spring; Boruto: Naruto the Movie; and the Naruto Shinden light novel series.

It premiered on TV Tokyo on April 5, 2017, and aired every Wednesday at 5:55 PM JST. Starting May 3, 2018 (episode 56) it aired every Thursday at 7:25 PM JST. Starting October 7, 2018 (episode 76) it has aired every Sunday at 5:30 PM JST. The series is also released on DVD. Viz Media licensed the series on March 23, 2017, for simulcast streaming on Hulu, and Crunchyroll.

The opening theme songs are "Gamushara" by Chico with HoneyWorks (episodes 206–230), "Gold" by Flow (episodes 231–255), and "Kirarirari" by Kana-Boon (episodes 256–281).

The ending theme songs are "Who are you?" by Pelican Fanclub (episodes 206–218), "Prologue" by JO1 (episodes 219–230), "Voltage" by Anly (episodes 231–242), "Twilight Fuzz" by This Is Japan (episodes 243–255), and "Bibōroku" by Lenny code fiction (episodes 256–268).

== Episode list ==
No.	Title (Note: All English titles are taken from Crunchyroll.)	Directed by	Written by	Original release date
209	"The Outcast"; Transliteration: "Nokemono" (Japanese: ノケモノ)	Yūsuke Onoda	Masaya Honda	August 1, 2021
After having a nightmare of Jigen, Kawaki stays home after refusing to train with Boruto due to their Karmas resonating with each other. He catches Himawari taking food for a wounded stray wolf named Jaggy. The two collect berries for Jaggy while coming to understand each other more. Once they return, they find Jaggy surrounded by a pack of feral wolves. When he gets home, Kawaki tosses a letter he wrote into the trash in frustration. In the morning, Kawaki and Himawari go out to buy more food for Jaggy while Boruto and Mitsuki wonder what's troubling Kawaki. When Himawari and Kawaki return to the woods they find Jaggy dead and Kawaki comforts Himawari. After burying Jaggy, Kawaki tells Himawari to go home while he tries to leave the village. However, Boruto stops him and reveals that Hinata found his goodbye letter for Naruto. Boruto realizes Kawaki blames himself for Jigen coming to Konoha, but Kawaki explains that because Jigen can appear whenever he wants, it's never going to be safe for them. Boruto tries to reason with him until Shikamaru shows up to stop Kawaki from leaving. Shikamaru explains that he will support Naruto's decision, elaborates that Kawaki is no longer Kara's sole target, and that Kawaki is already a citizen. Resigned from his decision to leave, Kawaki returns to Jaggy's grave where he finds Himawari paying her respect.
210	"Clues to Kara"; Transliteration: "Kara no Tegakari" (Japanese: 殻の手がかり)	Nozomi Fukui	Masahiro Ōkubo	August 8, 2021
Code grows bored guarding Kara's Ten-Tails, so he goes to meet Jigen, who instructs the former to be very wary even though the coordinates to the dimension have been changed. Delta arrives and reports of Boro's death and Naruto's escape and is assigned a mission by Jigen. Upon Naruto and Shikamaru's orders, Sai and Konohamaru are to infiltrate Boro's cult outside of the Five Great Nations' jurisdiction and retrieve any intel they can about Kara. Following their meeting with the higher-ups Shirabe and Tsuzumi at the temple, Konohamaru and Sai are given a tour by Inori. They tell Tsuzumi that they have heard rumors about Konoha shinobi killing Boro recently. Panicked, Tsuzumi goes below and accesses a secret lab to use a console in an effort to contact Boro to no avail. Sai and Konohamaru corner him and reveal themselves as Konoha shinobi and that Boro is dead. When prompted by the cult, Sai also shows them a notebook with all the people sent into pilgrimage, revealing them as test subjects for Kara's experiments and that they are actually dead. During the commotion, Delta steps through Kara's Space-Time Gate in the secret lab and begins demolishing the temple. Having returned safe, the duo report upon their findings regarding Boro's cult and that Delta is alive. Shikamaru notes that they haven't gotten any closer to solving the mystery of Kara, though Naruto assures them that they will defeat them all.
211	"The Chase"; Transliteration: "Tsuiseki" (Japanese: 追跡)	Yūta Suzuki	Kō Shigenobu	August 15, 2021
Koji is seen extracting crucial data from Konoha archives. Team Udon and Team Moegi discuss said data bandit at their favorite restaurant. Inojin explains to the others, that his father Sai has a description of the black-robed assailant and that the Yamanaka Sensory System hadn’t sensed the intruder before or after the theft. Team Moegi begin investigating the streets of Konoha and ambush the person coming nearby who turns out to be Kakashi. They begin staking out the hideout together. Inojin sees Koji from the sky and alerts the others, but the cloaked man begins heading towards a crowded main street to lose them. Shikadai surmises that Koji is planning to use the Thunder Train, where Shikadai holds Koji down, who turns out to be a Shadow Clone. Meanwhile, Koji infiltrates the secret archives, but Kakashi has already arrived and taken away the scroll Koji is after, having realized, that Koji was after data about shinobi from before the Fourth Great Ninja War. Kakashi engages Koji, who manages to escape. Kashin Koji returns to Kara’s hideout, where Amado tells him that the remaining Inners are away from the base, and they won’t ever realize, that Koji and Amado’s true goal is to eliminate Jigen.
212	"Amado's Defection"; Transliteration: "Amado no Bōmei" (Japanese: アマドの亡命)	Shigetaka Ikeda	Kyōko Katsuya	August 22, 2021
As Koji and Amado begin their escape, Delta appears but is deactivated by Amado. Koji would then use Reverse Summoning to send the toad carrying Amado to Konoha. At the village's outskirts, Team Moegi is training until Amado interrupts them and is caught by Shikadai's Shadow Paralysis Jutsu. However, Amado disperses it with a Scientific Ninja Tool, knocks Shikadai out, and places a bomb on his neck. Inojin telepathically contacts Ino for Shikamaru, who learns what happened to Shikadai. Moegi returns and restrains Amado while Sai and his ANBU squad surround them but that doesn't stop him from holding Shikadai's life hostage. He is then telepathically connected to Shikamaru, Katasuke, Kawaki, Boruto, Sumire, and Naruto, and wishes to defect to Konoha and share his knowledge about Kara and the Ōtsutsuki Clan. Naruto allows Amado to enter if he is restrained first. Back at Kara's headquarters, Koji interrupts Jigen's rest who then asks for his report. Kawaki reveals to the others of Amado's importance to Kara and Naruto gives his word that he would be protected once he talks. Amado shows everyone the transmission of Koji confronting Jigen, who knew of their betrayal and battles Koji, who reveals that he was created to kill Jigen.
213	"True Identity"; Transliteration: "Shōtai" (Japanese: 正体)	Ōri Yasukawa	Masaya Honda	August 29, 2021
As everyone watches the broadcast, Jigen questions Koji and Amado's motives. Due to Naruto and Sasuke draining him, Amado took that opportunity to eliminate Jigen. Naruto seems unsure but Amado affirms that was his true goal as Koji's assault disrupts the broadcast. Amado reveals that the Ōtsutsuki Clan want to attain godhood by absorbing chakra from every planet using the Ten-Tails. He also reveals that he left the coordinates to Kara's Ten-Tails for Sasuke and that its actually Isshiki Ōtsutsuki's goal, who took over Jigen's body a thousand years ago on earth after being betrayed by Kaguya. Meanwhile, Jigen absorbs Koji's attacks and figures out why he let Konoha take Kawaki. Amado is allowed to stay in Konoha by Naruto but leaves Shikadai's bomb on until it's in writing. He reveals that Karma is a back-up file of an Ōtsutsuki that will take over a person's body and that Jigen received his from Isshiki. Jigen's Karma spreads and he lunges at Koji, who traps him in quicksand. Naruto wonders why Isshiki didn't resurrect in Jigen's body which Amado reveals that it's too weak and he decided to look for a suitable Vessel. The broadcast reconnects and they see Koji incinerate Jigen with natural flames since Karma can only absorb chakra-based substances.
214	"Predestined Fate"; Transliteration: "Shukumei" (Japanese: 宿命)	Noriyuki Abe Masayuki Matsumoto Ema Saitō	Atsushi Nishiyama	September 5, 2021
Jigen shrinks the flames but is engulf once more as his body starts to crack. Amado explains that Isshiki's ability, Sukunahikona allows him to shrink objects, nonliving matter, and his own body but in his weakened state he'll soon burn to death. Sasuke questions why Amado would want Jigen to die, which would only leave Kawaki for Isshiki to resurrect into. Amado assures him that Jigen's dead body is still viable for Isshiki, forcing him to resurrect in a weak body that won't be able to contain his power. He also states that Karma's decompression will begin on Jigen's body automatically because Kawaki's is still incomplete. As Kawaki's Karma spreads, Amado reveals that the process will wipe away his Karma to prevent a duplicate. Kawaki falls unconscious and Boruto checks his left hand which no longer has Karma, signifying Isshiki's revival. Isshiki begins shrinking everything with his special eye, including the Toad watching them and taunts Koji, already knowing his true identity as Jiraiya's clone. Koji continues his onslaught, but Isshiki shrinks everything thrown at him. Amado receives his citizen papers and reveals that Shikadai's bomb was a dud. Koji uses Sage Mode and blinds Isshiki for a sneak attack though Isshiki uses Daikokuten to drop enlarged columns onto him.
215	"Prepared"; Transliteration: "Kakugo" (Japanese: 覚悟)	Mitsuo Hashimoto	Hideto Tanaka	September 12, 2021
Isshiki taunts Koji before he escapes using his Steam Toad. At Konoha, Naruto refuses Boruto's request to fight Isshiki by their side as he reasons that Momoshiki might take over again. Sai interrupts, reporting that the evacuation has commenced and takes them to the Foundation's underground headquarters, which is built using a substance that blocks the Byakugan's vision. Tsunade and Kakashi gathers all shinobi so Shikamaru could warn them of Isshiki's impending arrival. Sasuke tells Boruto that both he and Naruto are ready to die for the village and questions Boruto's resolve. Ino informs everyone that Isshiki has arrived, who confronts Konohamaru, Rock Lee, Tenten, Kiba, and Choji. Sarada leaves the hospital to join the battle but is stopped by Mitsuki. Naruto arrives to save his friends from Isshiki, who questions him about Kawaki's whereabouts. He engages Isshiki but is kicked through several buildings and about to be crushed until Sasuke switches places with him. He tosses his blade at Isshiki, who tries shrinking it, only for it to turn into Boruto, who pulls Isshiki into a portal to another dimension with Naruto and Sasuke following them.
216	"Sacrifice"; Transliteration: "Ikenie" (Japanese: 生贄)	Ayumu Ono	Masaya Honda	September 19, 2021
Isshiki realizes that he must kill Sasuke and Naruto to prevent their interference and notices that Boruto's Karma has almost completely decompressed, making him valuable. Naruto and Sasuke try to keep up with Isshiki's immense power, but he proves to be troublesome. Kawaki awakens just as Shikamaru informs them of the situation and tries to use Karma but realizes he no longer has it. Amado tries to calm him, stating they still have a chance and tells everyone that Boruto is valuable to Isshiki since a live Ōtsutsuki is needed for the Ten-Tails to consume and produce a Chakra Fruit. He also theorizes that this was Kaguya's role as well and that this was the original purpose of Karma. Meanwhile, Isshiki summons giant cubes from his pocket dimension to crush Naruto and critically injures Sasuke with his rods. Isshiki stops himself from killing Sasuke since Boruto, notices his own value, stepped in his way and threatens to kill himself but Isshiki shrinks his kunai and breaks his arm. Kurama questions Naruto's resolve to sacrifice himself for Konoha and reveals one last weapon for Naruto to use, who appears in front of Isshiki in a new form.
217	"Decision"; Transliteration: "Ketsui" (Japanese: 決意)	Nozomi Fukui	Masaya Honda	September 26, 2021
Isshiki and Sasuke are both surprised by the chakra Naruto exudes in his new form, who is able to effortlessly dodge and repel Isshiki. Kurama reveals that Baryon Mode consumes their life force until it runs out and that Naruto must avoid doing or thinking anything unnecessary. Isshiki tries to crush Naruto with cubes, however, Naruto counters and send them back at Isshiki, who fires enlarged rods but Naruto avoids them and knocks Isshiki around. However, he begins to feel the drawbacks of Baryon Mode as Isshiki uses his Byakugan to see that Naruto is siphoning his life force off as well. Isshiki grabs Naruto and senses that Kawaki is connected to his chakra, so he summons him to their location and goes after him until Sasuke blinds him with a smoke bomb that blocks the Byakugan's vision. In desperation, Isshiki unleashes all his shrunken rods on the battleground and holds Naruto hostage to draw Kawaki out. Isshiki begins counting down, which reminds Kawaki of the time Jigen used to train him and comes out of hiding due to the good memories he gained since coming to Konoha.
218	"Partner"; Transliteration: "Aibō" (Japanese: 相棒)	Masayuki Kōda Yūsuke Onoda	Masaya Honda	October 3, 2021
Isshiki lunges at Kawaki, who attacks using Fire Style, but it proves useless as Isshiki grabs him and implants Karma on him once more. He gloats before his body begins to deconstruct and crumble due to implanting Karma on Kawaki's Shadow Clone which faded away. Sasuke and Kawaki check up on Naruto and just as they question the ramifications of Baryon Mode, Momoshiki takes over Boruto's body and stabs out Sasuke's Rinnegan. Naruto tells Momoshiki, who battles Kawaki to give up since he can't obtain the Chakra Fruit anymore. However, Momoshiki reveals that he can still use Kawaki since his body is 80% Ōtsutsuki now. Sasuke manages to save Kawaki from Momoshiki, who knocks out Sasuke with a Vanishing Rasengan and corners Kawaki until he is forced to absorb Kawaki's Fire Style due to the latter setting himself on fire. Boruto wakes up and manages to stop Momoshiki from taking Kawaki away. Boruto apologizes while Sasuke approaches Naruto, who fell unconscious. Kurama talks to Naruto inside his mind for their final moments and the latter says that they should stick together in the afterlife as well. However, Kurama reveals that he's the one dying instead and that due to his chakra fading away, Naruto won't die. Kurama begins to fade away and warns Naruto to be careful, as he won't be as strong anymore, before saying goodbye. Naruto then wakes up to Boruto crying and hugging him, while Sasuke and Kawaki stand by him.
219	"Return"; Transliteration: "Kikan" (Japanese: 帰還)	Tazumi Mukaiyama	Kō Shigenobu	October 10, 2021
Boruto tries creating a portal with his Karma, since Sasuke lost his Rinnegan, to no avail and Kawaki realizes that Boruto is hesitant due to his fear of Momoshiki appearing again. After their argument gets intense, Boruto manages to open the portal and everyone goes through it with Mitsuki, Sarada, Sumire, Shikamaru and Katasuke greeting the victors. Naruto tells Amado and Shikamaru everything that transpired in the other dimension. Amado reveals that the only Inner left is Code, who is a failed Vessel for Isshiki, branded with a White Karma and has limiters placed on him due to wanting to disrespect Jigen's authority as leader. Meanwhile, Code wakes up and rants about his defected Karma, which suddenly manifests Isshiki's spirit, who tells Code to avenge him and inherit the Ōtsutsuki's will. Sakura tells Kawaki and Boruto that their bodies are indeed 80% Ōtsutsuki. When he leaves the hospital, Boruto is surrounded by reporters and all of his friends see him being interviewed live. Later, Mitsuki and Sarada tell Boruto that Team 7 has been banned from taking on missions for the time being.
220	"Remaining Time"; Transliteration: "Nokosareta Jikan" (Japanese: 残された時間)	Takeshi Yoshimoto	Masaya Honda	October 17, 2021
Naruto and Shikamaru tell the other Kage everything they have learned about Kara and discuss about Boruto. Meanwhile, Kawaki's arm is restored by Amado and warns Sumire and Katasuke to be careful with Amado. Mitsuki finds Boruto and learns that he is afraid of going to sleep due to the fear of Momoshiki taking over. Naruto and Shikamaru learn from Katasuke that Boruto has half a year left at best and discuss with Sasuke about how to deal with his situation. Naruto finds Boruto and tells him that he won't allow him. Amado gives Naruto pills that he secretly administered to Kawaki to slow Karma's process and weaken the Byakugan. However, he is unsure what side effects they could have on Boruto and sympathizes with Naruto's situation. Naruto tells Boruto about the pills, who immediately takes one and after a recent checkup, Boruto tells Sarada and Mitsuki that his Karma has stopped extracting. Amado begins officially working at Katasuke's lab with Sumire as his assistant. Kawaki returns the prosthetic arm to Naruto, who asks would he like to become a genin. Kawaki says he'll think about it and Naruto suggests to Shikamaru that they should host another Chunin Exam.
221	"The Chunin Exams Resume"; Transliteration: "Chūnin Shiken, Futatabi" (Japanese: 中忍試験、再び)	Shigetaka Ikeda	Kyōko Katsuya	October 24, 2021
Under Sai's supervision, the Chunin Exams begins with the written exam and nine teams pass. Naruto addresses the remaining teams that the Chunin Exam is meant to calm the villagers, who have been on edge since Isshiki's attack. The second exam is revealed to be held in the Forest of Death and Shikamaru reveals the goal is to rescue ten shinobi from the forest. Sai adds that everyone will be on his own during the exam and only ten will pass. The teams split up and head into the woods. Namida gets tricked and knocked out by Mirai. Team 40 gets stuck in quicksand. Mirai tries to fool Sarada as well while Denki, Tsubaki, Iwabe, Wasabi, Inojin, Houki, Mitsuki and Cho-Cho pass. Kaito Kawanami traps Boruto but a bear appears causing him to be rescued by Boruto. Sarada passes as well, leaving only one spot left. Boruto is a few seconds late because he rescued Kaito, however Sai states that they were being judged based on overall performance and Boruto did the right thing. Sai and Moegi explain that the final test will be one-on-one battles, meaning only five of the ten will become chunin.
222	"The Night Before the Final Round"; Transliteration: "Kessen Zen'ya" (Japanese: 決戦前夜)	Naoki Kotani	Atsushi Nishiyama	October 31, 2021
Having gone through so much, Boruto wants to show everyone how much he has matured since the last Chunin Exams, a sentiment which Sarada and Mitsuki relate to, and they all agree not to hold back against each other. Kawaki catches Boruto going to train with Mitsuki and tells him not to embarrass himself. Denki and Iwabe strengthen their resolve with Metal Lee helping them. Katasuke provides Denki a tool and allows them to test it in one of his labs. Sai meets Team 25, all of whom are confident that Houki will become chunin. Tsubaki receives a letter from the Land of Iron to return home with a leadership position being granted to her, much to her joy and disappointment of her teammates. Team 5 interrupts their meal and Tsubaki learns that Denki was testing a Scientific Ninja Tool all day. Sarada returns to the waterfall with Sasuke, who tells her that as a shinobi, one must always be prepared for anything. She finds Cho-Cho training by herself, who has decided not to let Shikadai remain the only chunin in their squad. The day of the final exam arrives, bringing with it four undesirables who enter the village.
223	"Inojin vs. Houki"; Transliteration: "Inojin tai Hōki" (Japanese: いのじん対ホウキ)	Yoshifumi Sasahara	Masahiro Ōkubo	November 7, 2021
While the contestants gather at the arena, Shikamaru appoints Konohamaru to be referee for the matches. Himawari finds Mitsuki and Boruto, and tells them about how she and her friends began tracking suspicious individuals, so Boruto and Mitsuki decide to help out. Meanwhile, Naruto entices Kawaki with the promise of various ninjutsu displays in order to make him watch the exam. Konohamaru explains the rules of the exam, before announcing the first match between Houki and Inojin. Boruto and Mitsuki witness Amado thrown onto a train by suspicious people, causing them get on it as well. The match begins with Inojin using various Super Beast Scrolls, however Houki counters with Toujinbo. Inojin tries flying away, but Houki destroys his ink bird, so he hides between the rock pillars. Houki realizes that Inojin will use the Mind Transfer to ensure victory. Inojin catches Houki in the jutsu, but is unable to escape thanks to the high-level ANBU training Houki received from Sai. Houki is declared winner and Sai congratulates both of them for their efforts. Konohamaru reveals the next match is going to be between Wasabi and Iwabe. Meanwhile, Mitsuki and Boruto enter the train but find no one on board.
224	"The Legend of the Monster Cat"; Transliteration: "Bakeneko Densetsu" (Japanese: 化け猫伝説)	Mitsuo Hashimoto	Hideto Tanaka	November 14, 2021
Wasabi and Iwabe's teammates hype them up for their imminent fight. Wasabi's parents and grandmother also arrive to cheer her on. The latter hands Wasabi a scroll of a legendary monster cat technique to use in battle. The second match begins and Iwabe starts taunting Wasabi. Team Shinki arrives from the Hidden Sand to observe the matches, having already become chunin during their own exam. Shinki is intrigued by Kawaki's presence. Iwabe and Wasabi start to clash over their convictions, or lack thereof. Iwabe inspires her by creating a huge Earth Style cat statue. He faints from using too much chakra, and just before the crumbling statue could crush him, Wasabi manages to finally use the monster cat scroll to save him. Konohamaru declares Wasabi winner, since she cannot wake Iwabe up. He announces the next match between Cho-Cho and Sarada. In the meantime, Mitsuki and Boruto follow the tracks of the kidnappers, in order to rescue Amado.
225	"Showdown Between Best Friends"; Transliteration: "Shin'yū Taiketsu" (Japanese: 親友対決)	Noriyuki Abe Ema Saitō	Tōko Machida	November 21, 2021
Kawaki notices Shinki staring at him and they go outside to talk. He gets angered by Shinki telling him to watch the matches and attacks but is defeated. Sarada and Cho-Cho meet in the arena and Cho-Cho tries attacking Sarada, who activates her Sharingan and showers the arena with Lightning Balls after dodging the attack. Cho-Cho is angered by Sarada apologizing for hurting her and not taking their fight seriously. Cho-Cho lands a hit in and questions Sarada's resolve, reminding her of her talk with Sasuke. Cho-Cho lunges in with her Human Boulder but Sarada counters with a Fireball. Naruto likens the fight to his with Sasuke, who is watching the match. Cho-Cho uses her Butterfly Wings as Sarada charges at her with the Chidori, creating an explosion and Sarada is declared winner. As she is helped up by her teammates, Cho-Cho breaks down crying because she couldn't keep her promise. Sasuke congratulates Sarada and notices Boruto and Mitsuki absence, who are listen to the kidnappers offer Amado a facility and money so that he could advance their nation. When Amado refuses, they try to kill him but Boruto and Mitsuki rescue Amado and hurry back to the Chunin Exams.
226	"Samurai vs. Science"; Transliteration: "Samurai tai Kagaku" (Japanese: サムライ対カガク)	Ayumu Ono	Kō Shigenobu	November 28, 2021
Konohamaru disqualifies Boruto and Mitsuki due to them not making the time limit. Sarada catches her teammates up to speed as the match begins and Denki reveals the Scientific Ninja Tool he built. Tsubaki lunges at Denki though he manages to dodge everything as Katasuke explains how the suit works to Team 7. Thanks to his predictive software, Denki has the upperhand until Tsubaki starts using unpredictable attacks to surprise him. She manages to destroy his visor, stopping him from predicting her attacks. His exo-suit starts overheating but Denki refuses to give up and sacrifices it in order to stop Tsubaki. He defeats her with Elekiter, making him the winner. The Chunin Exams come to an end with Houki, Wasabi, Sarada, and Denki becoming chunin. Tsubaki apologizes to Namida and Wasabi for losing and being inconsiderate of them, regarding her letter from the Land of Iron. Tsubaki is determined to get stronger and asks to stay longer in the village. Team Shinki returns to Suna, revealing that their mission was to survey Kawaki for Gaara, though Shinki expresses his disappointment over not getting to see Boruto fight. Kawaki tells Naruto that he doesn't mind starting off as a genin. Mitsuki and Boruto decide to have their match anyway and return to the arena.
227	"Team 7's Last Mission?!"; Transliteration: "Dainanahan, Saigo no Ninmu!?" (Japanese: 第七班、最後の任務!?)	Yūsuke Onoda	Masahiro Ōkubo	December 5, 2021
Team 7 laments about Konohamaru having to leave the team due Sarada's promotion so they decide to visit him but learn from Sai and Shikamaru that he's on a mission with Mirai. The next day, they find out that Mirai returned poisoned and is hospitalized. Meanwhile, Konohamaru is being beaten by his captives led by Hyogo in order to protect the cilents they were escorting. When Mirai reports everything she knows, Team 7 volunteers for the mission and Naruto decides to send them as backup for Konohamaru. They arrive at the village and Boruto distracts Hyogo and his men while Konohamaru decides to break free. As fog sets down, Sarada and Mitsuki start taking down the goons. Mitsuki tells Konohamaru that all the villagers were already rescued by them. Konohamaru stops Hyogo from fleeing with his team's help and gets emotional about how far his students have progressed. The Chunin ceremony begins and Naruto officially declares Sarada, Houki, Denki and Wasabi as Chunin. Team 7 takes a picture with Konohamaru to commemorate their time together.
228	"Kawaki's Path to Becoming a Ninja"; Transliteration: "Kawaki, Shinobi e no Michi" (Japanese: カワキ、忍への道)	Masayuki Matsumoto	Kyōko Katsuya	December 12, 2021
Kawaki goes on a mission with Team 5 to capture a panda so Shikamaru and Naruto could assess his potential as a genin. He falls asleep, letting the panda get away but Iwabe and Denki manage to capture it. Kawaki leaves in the middle of them berating him and goes to trains. The boys gather up at the restaurant and discuss whether Kawaki is suited to become a shinobi. Boruto tries to give Kawaki some advice, but he lashes out about not wanting any friends. He goes on a mission with Team 15 and ends up scaring the child they were trying to return home. Naruto decides to put Kawaki on a mission with Shikadai and Cho-Cho, revealing that this is his last chance to become a genin. However, Kawaki leaves citing he's not suited to be a shinobi and receives his pay for the missions he undertook. Boruto tries talking to Kawaki about the mission, but he runs out. Hinata tells Boruto that Kawaki doesn't know how to interact with people because of the life previously lived. Kawaki finds Sarada training and they have a discussion about their goals. After training all night, Kawaki decides to show up for the mission and they head out with their client Mozuku.
229	"Breach of Orders"; Transliteration: "Meirei Ihan" (Japanese: 命令違反)	Yūta Suzuki	Kyōko Katsuya	December 19, 2021
After torturing their captive, Kurobane and Jujumaru head toward Konoha to claim Mozuku is carrying. Meanwhile, Cho-Cho gushes over Kawaki while Mozuku treats him rudely because of his behavior. Konohamaru reports on the victim to Naruto and Shikamaru connects a string of murders, surmising that it is related to Kawaki's client. in the middle of their mission, Team 7 notices Kurobane and Jujumaru. Cho-Cho shares her food with Kawaki, who opens up to Mozuku as Kurobane and Jujumaru spy on them. During the misty night, they trap Team Shikadai and take the box from Mozuku. While Kurobane leaves with the box, Jujumaru stays behind to eliminate Team Shikadai. Cho-Cho rolls through the barrier, freeing the others, but causes her to fall under Jujumaru's control. In turn, Shikadai uses Shadow Possession to control Cho-Cho and surprise Jujumaru. After a strenuous fight, during which Cho-Cho is injured while protecting Mozuku, Kawaki and Shikadai take down Jujumaru. Mozuku explains his intentions of developing a cure for the epidemic plaguing his country and that the Feudal Lord sanctioned their deaths in secret to monopolize the cure. Kawaki decides to help Mozuku get the medicine back to his country safely, disobeying Shikadai, and telling him to take Cho-Cho back to the village.
230	"A Wish"; Transliteration: "Negai" (Japanese: 願い)	Tazumi Mukaiyama	Kyōko Katsuya	December 26, 2021
Kawaki and Mozuku go after Kurobane while Shikadai takes Cho-Cho back to Konoha. Naruto and Shikamaru decide to send Team 7, who completed their mission, to back up Shikadai's team after learning the truth of the other boys murders from Konohamaru. Sarada and Boruto find Shikadai and Cho-Cho and learn what's happening. Kawaki battles Kurobane whose jutsu allows him to absorb water from his opponents' bodies. Kawaki catches Kurobane off guard and pummels him into a tree until Kurobane throws his blade at Kawaki but Mozuku takes the hit for him. Boruto and Shikadai arrive to stop Kurobane from getting away with Kawaki giving him a severe beatdown. Mozuku asks Kawaki to take the medicine back to his nation before dying. Shikadai and Boruto hold off more pursuers, allowing Kawaki to deliver the medicine to Aosa. Kawaki blames himself for Mozuku's death, surmising that he'd still be alive had he followed Shikadai's orders. Naruto and Shikamaru look into ways to help the Land of Calm Seas. Shikadai brings Kawaki to Shikaku's grave and enlightens him about the duties shinobi have to their village. Kawaki talks to Naruto about taking the test again and learns he passed due to Shikadai speaking positively about him in his report.
231	"The Rusty Sword"; Transliteration: "Sabita Katana" (Japanese: 錆びた刀)	Shigetaka Ikeda	Atsushi Nishiyama	January 9, 2022
Tsubaki dreams about her samurai training with Sazanka and about their rivalry to win Mifune's katana. In the morning, she joins Wasabi and Namida at the hospital for a mission, where a merchant is bedridden. When the merchant is horrified by Tsubaki's katana, they realize a samurai was the culprit. After investigating the scene of the crime, Tsubaki finds evidence which suggests Sazanka was the assailant. While they were investigating, another merchant was attacked so they put a plan in motion to stop the criminal, but not before Tsubaki reveals her suspicions, as well as Sazanka's past attempt of trying to steal Mifune's katana. Team Wasabi gets the drop on the bandits, who reveal their bodyguard, Sazanka. Team Wasabi is forced to withdraw after Tsubaki fails to stop Sazanka from wounding her. Tsubaki tells the others that she is to blame for how Sazanka turned out, having won Mifune's blade by pure luck in the tournament against him. Team Wasabi returns with strengthened resolve and Tsubaki faces Sazanka once more, while Wasabi and Namida handle the bandits. The duel begins and Sazanka leaves no openings for Tsubaki to strike. However, she tells Sazanka that she gained strength from her comrades while his became dull from solitude and manages to defeat him.
232	"Captain Denki's First Mission"; Transliteration: "Denki Taichō no Hatsu Ninmu" (Japanese: デンキ隊長の初任務)	Takeshi Yoshimoto	Tōko Machida	January 16, 2022
Naruto assigns Team Denki their first B-rank mission to deliver fully automated puppets to the Land of Water. Katasuke explains to Team Denki that their destination, Dotou Island, earns its income primarily from gold mining and they are in need of the puppets to safely excavate. After a long trip, Team Denki makes it to Dotou Island where they are greeted by Ounami, the chief of the excavation site. Ounami leads them into the mines where Denki activates the puppets to show how they work. Two miners retrieve a large bag of gold hidden behind rubble and take Ounami hostage while making their escape and locking everyone else in. Denki manages to dig them out with the puppets and use them to track the thieves to the shore. With the help of the puppets and all three of them working together, Team Denki defeat the thieves and retrieves the gold. Afterwards, Katasuke's research team arrives on the island.
233	"The New Team 7 Jumps Into Action"; Transliteration: "Shinsei Dai Nana-han, Hatsudō" (Japanese: 新生第七班、発動)	Yūichirō Aoki	Masaya Honda	January 23, 2022
A pirate named Isari approaches the Hidden Mist from the oceanside, leading his battalion of ships. Meanwhile, Kawaki receives his headband and Naruto places him on Team 7 under Sarada's command. Naruto reveals their first mission together is to escort Katasuke to the Mist for a tech conference in the midst of rumors of a terrorist attack. At the conference, the next-generation power plant, the Shinonome is presented. Boruto searches for Kagura and learns that he became a prison warden. Sarada and Katasuke allow Boruto to go to the prison and greets Kagura. While there, he learns that some of Kagura's former teammates are held there and that Shizuma escaped after killing the previous warden. Kagura gives Boruto a tour of the prison, ending up at the central cell, housing Araumi Funato, the head of the Funato clan. Meanwhile, everyone at the conference is heading to the Shinonome by blimp and Sarada worries that Boruto won't make it back in time. One of the blimps crashes, killing the inventor's son and Isari starts his assault.
234	"The Unleashed Villain"; Transliteration: "Hanatareta Akutō" (Japanese: 放たれた悪党)	Rokō Ogiwara	Masaya Honda	January 30, 2022
Chojuro extinguishes the flaming blimp while Sarada tries resuscitating Katasuke, who was injured by the explosion. Boruto tries heading back from the prison, but the power lines get severed by Isari, who breaks into the prison with his men. Kagura and Boruto head to intercept the intruders. Isari rescues his father Araumi, who rejuvenates himself by absorbing all the water from the guards' bodies. While Isari takes his father back to the ships, the pirates take over several islands. Boruto and Kagura rejoin Sarada, Mitsuki and Kawaki, telling them about the prison escape. Kagura convinces Chojuro to allow him, his former teammates and Team Sarada to infiltrate the pirate-controlled islands and join up with Team Denki. The extended team sets course for Dotou Island.
235	"Infiltrating Dotou Island"; Transliteration: "Sennyū, Dotōjima" (Japanese: 潜入、ドトウ島)	Masayuki Matsumoto	Atsushi Nishiyama	February 6, 2022
The team manage to outrun some Funato pirates as they get to Doutou Island. Buntan shows Sarada the curse marks they have placed on them to control and kill them if they disobey. Sarada and Mitsuki infiltrate the island to rescue Team Denki and the researchers while Team Kagura, Kawaki and Boruto stay on watch and try to procure another ship. Mitsuki and Sarada overhear the pirates talking about excavating all the gold from the mines using the islanders. Team Denki is holed up in a cave, planning to rescue the miners and Leaf researchers. Sarada and Mitsuki manage to retrieve one of Denki's puppets from the Funato which leads them to Team Denki. Meanwhile, Kagura reveals to Boruto that he's the reason Kagura supports and tries to reform his former comrades as it was Boruto who helped him out of Shizuma's clutches. Meanwhile, something huge approaches their ship in the mist.
236	"Cut and Run"; Transliteration: "Dasshutsu" (Japanese: 脱出)	Yūsuke Onoda	Kyōko Katsuya	February 13, 2022
A large Funato fortress approaches Team Kagura's ship. Kagura sends Boruto, Kawaki, and Buntan to check the fortress out up close. Meanwhile, Team Denki goes to the harbor to commandeer a large ship while Sarada and Mitsuki rescue the captive miners and researchers. Boruto, Kawaki, and Buntan make it onto the mobile fortress. The fort commander, Tenma, receives word that Isari rescued their father. One of the miners reveals to Tenma's men on the island that there are Leaf researchers mixed in with the miners. Mitsuki and Sarada successfully liberate the hostages from the mines. Denki manages to hotwire the ship and they manage to escape. Buntan cures Kawaki's motion sickness and discovers a giant Scientific Ninja Tool cannon on deck.
237	"The Mobile Fortress"; Transliteration: "Idō Yōsai" (Japanese: 移動要塞)	Ema Saitō	Hideto Tanaka	February 20, 2022
Kagura receives word from Sarada that they rescued Team Denki and the hostages. Soon after, Boruto contacts him too from the fortress and tells him about the Scientific Ninja Tool cannon and how everyone should leave before they come head-to-head with it. Boruto decides that they must destroy the cannon before it could be used. Kagura's ship crashes into the fort, giving Boruto's group an opportunity to act. Kagura's group gets through the pirates and rejoins Boruto's at the cannon. Tenma arrives to stop them from destroying the cannon and defeats Kyohō and Hebiichigo. Sarada's group approaches the fort while Kagura and Kawaki battle Tenma to give Boruto and Buntan more time to destroy the cannon. The cannon manages to fire before they could destroy it, but Denki steers their ship out of the way. As Kawaki and Kagura hold Tenma down, Boruto uses a crane to turn the cannon as it fires, destroying itself and upper levels of the fort. Sarada's group picks everybody up from the sea after their escape from the crumpling fort.
238	"A Killer on the Ship"; Transliteration: "Satsujinki no Fune" (Japanese: 殺人鬼の船)	Akira Shimizu	Kō Shigenobu	February 27, 2022
The ship leaves the Funato territory though tensions arise when Iwabe voices his distrust of Kyohō. In the morning, the group is horrified by their ship captain's murder, and everyone suspects Kyohō, so Buntan and Hebiichigo help the group in finding him, just as he is wiping the captain's blood off the Helmet Splitter. However, Hebiichigo tells everyone that Kyohō was sleeping because of his previous blind rage while fighting Tenma. The group decides to thoroughly investigate the ship for the real culprit while Boruto and Iwabe guard Kyohō. Kawaki finds a witness among the miners who claims to have seen Kyohō walk towards captain Taiki's quarters in the night. He leads the miners down to Kyohō and everyone demands he remove his mask to show if he has a Funato facial marking. Kyohō runs off but Iwabe corners him with Kawaki stepping in to kill Kyohō. During the night, a Funato pirate emerges from the witness' body, revealing himself to be the killer, and tries to take Kyohō's body. However, Kyoho is revealed to still be alive and the others arrive to corner the culprit. But the culprit sacrifices himself to destroy their ship's engine. Later, Kyohō tells everyone that his mask covers his scars left by the Funato when they burned his village down years ago.
239	"The Boy from the Isle of Shipbuilders"; Transliteration: "Zōsen no Shima no Shōnen" (Japanese: 造船の島の少年)	Shigetaka Ikeda	Masahiro Ōkubo	March 6, 2022
Boruto falls in the sea and is rescued by a shadowy figure, but when the others wake him, they tell him he just passed out from the heat. A small boat arrives, carrying the captain and a boy named Ikada. Kagura recognizes the captain as Kajiki, the leader of a shipbuilding colony on an island north of the Mist. Kajiki decides to help them out by towing their ship to the shipbuilding isle. After arriving at the colony, Kajiki begins repairing their ship with help from Team Denki and Boruto while Kagura and Sarada contact Chojuro. Kawaki and Mitsuki stay at the harbor to survey the area. Meanwhile, the Funato clan is preparing for battle and Tenma reports to his father Isari and their sister Seiren about the destruction of the mobile fortress. Kagura speaks with the Mizukage's aide, who informs him that Chojuro went to the front lines to prepare for all-out war with the growing Funato clan. Kajiki sends Ikada and Boruto out to obtain an engine part from a factory on a nearby island.
240	"Ikada's Dream"; Transliteration: "Ikada no Yume" (Japanese: イカダの夢)	Tazumi Mukaiyama	Masahiro Ōkubo	March 13, 2022
Boruto and Ikada get to know each other while sailing to the island. Sarada informs Mitsuki and Team Denki of the escalating situation, which forced Chojuro to go to the front lines against the Funato clan. Ikada's boat runs into a shipwrecked man, and he jumps out to save them at Boruto's behest. As he watches Ikada rescuing them, Boruto realizes that Ikada was the one who rescued him as well. They manage to escape the rough seas and reach the island. Meanwhile, Isari tells Araumi about the Mizukage's gathered fleet, but Araumi is confident that his daughter Seiren can win the battle against him. Ikada and Boruto return to Kajiki with the part and they're able to fix the ship's engine. Seiren closes in on their island, aiming to bring her little brother, Ikada back into the fold.
241	"Ikada's Secret"; Transliteration: "Ikada no Himitsu" (Japanese: イカダの秘密)	Yoshifumi Sasahara	Tōko Machida	March 20, 2022
Seiren confronts some traitors to the clan. Ikada tells Boruto that their ship will be repaired in a couple days. During the night, Seiren disguises herself and reaches the shipbuilding isle. In the morning, she confronts Ikada about coming back to the Funato clan and that he has until nightfall to be ready for departure. Meanwhile, Kagura and Kawaki have a conversation about Boruto until Sarada delivers Kagura a letter from the Hidden Mist which reveals that Buntan, Kyoho, and Hebiichigo will only get a three-year reduction in their sentence. Hebiichigo, who overheard, suggests to her comrades that they should kill Kagura in order to remove their curse marks and escape. When Buntan and Kyoho refuse to help, Hebiichigo goes to assassinate Kagura but fails and escape. Meanwhile, Seiren orders an attack on the island to eliminate the Leaf shinobi and closes in on the port, just as Hebiichigo notices the boat closing in.
242	"Seiren" (Japanese: 青煉(セイレン))	Ayumu Ono	Masaya Honda	March 27, 2022
Chojuro's fleet confronts the Funato clan led by Isari and Tenma. A squad of Mist shinobi request Kagura's leadership on the battlefield but he refuses to leave the Leaf shinobi behind in danger. Seiren orders Funamushi to capture Kagura while she disposes of Boruto and retrieves Ikada. Funamushi summons mind-controlling leeches which take over some of the Mist shinobi as well as Buntan and Kawaki. Seiren attacks Boruto by the docks while Funamushi ambushes Kagura. Metal saves Hebiichigo from a mind-controlled Mist shinobi. After managing to knock Funamushi out, Kagura rushes to help Boruto and gets injured after protecting him from an attack. Using the sound of thunder to mask their approach, Kagura and Boruto manage to ambush Seiren and gravely injure her. Funamushi barges in and manages to rescue her before she could be captured. Having gotten rid of the leeches, everyone regroups, and Kagura asks Kyoho, Buntan, and Hebiichigo to track Seiren and her men. Meanwhile, with the information that Seiren was injured by Kagura and Boruto, Funamushi convinces Ikada to return to the ship with him.
243	"Where I Belong"; Transliteration: "Ibasho" (Japanese: 居場所)	Rokō Ogiwara	Atsushi Nishiyama	April 3, 2022
The sea battle begins as Mist shinobi blast the Funato Clan's ships with Water Style jutsus, however Isari has predicted their actions and laid a trap for them. Back at the island, Kagura realizes that the sea battle is just a diversion thanks to a secret message Seiren's troops left behind. The message reveals that elite Funato troops are to infiltrate and take the Hidden Mist over, so Boruto suggests they all head there. Buntan tells Kagura that they will only help if they regain their freedom afterwards which Kagura promises to make possible. As the others prepare to leave for a village in the mountains to ambush the Funato, Boruto tries tracking down Ikada to no avail. Once the group reaches the mountain village, Kagura explains that it is his childhood village. The villagers help the group strengthen the village's defenses. As the sun sets, Funamushi leads the forces to the mountain village.
244	"Rift"; Transliteration: "Kiretsu" (Japanese: 亀裂)	Naoki Kotani	Kyōko Katsuya	April 10, 2022
Finding the bridges collapsed, Funamushi leads his forces into the ravine just as Kagura planned. Buntan confronts Hebiichigo about her attempt on Kagura's life. Hebiichigo, still in doubt that they would get acquitted, tries convincing Buntan of running away in the chaos and rejoining Shizuma's group. Buntan advises her to stop putting her trust in the wrong people, based on her own relationship with Shizuma, and how he used her during the prison escape. Kagura releases the Curse Marks binding his squad. The shinobi and most of the villagers take cover to ward off Funamushi's scouting party, to ensure that the Funato elite squad does take the bait and enter the ravine. Kagura, Boruto and Mitsuki head to the mountains to retrieve some kids who ran off with Kawaki's headband. In the commotion of the scouting party entering the village, Hebiichigo runs off, with Metal unsuccessfully trying to convince her to come back. Kagura trusts Buntan and Kyoho to go and bring her back.
245	"Funamushi's Tenacity"; Transliteration: "Funamushi no Shūnen" (Japanese: フナムシの執念)	Yūsuke Onoda	Kō Shigenobu	April 17, 2022
Buntan and Kyoho are slowly catching up to Hebiichigo. Kagura and the others await their return as well as the arrival of the Funato unit in the ravine, but a Funato scout notices them. Hebiichigo overhears the scout talk about the Funato's ambush plans and ponders on returning to warn Kagura. Funamushi's ambush succeeds, and the rest of his forces move in to overwhelm Kagura's resistance until Hebiichigo, Buntan, and Kyoho return to help. As they engage the main unit, Funamushi decides to defeat Kagura and Boruto personally for injuring Seiren. Kagura's resistance is forced to retreat to the mountain village as Funamushi pursues. In the advantageous terrain, they manage to defeat most of the Funato forces, but Funamushi's large scale attack overwhelms them. Kagura unleashes the full power of Hiramekarei to counter his jutsu, successfully cutting through it, but Funamushi manages to pin him from behind. Using Kagura as a hostage, Funamushi tells everyone to drop their weapons. Once they do, Boruto demands he release Kagura, however Funamushi reveals he had no intention to as he impales Kagura with his Water Style blade.
246	"A Heavy Loss"; Transliteration: "Itade" (Japanese: 痛手)	Takeshi Yoshimoto	Tōko Machida	April 24, 2022
Everyone charges at Funamushi, but he disarms and blocks them until an enraged Boruto gets through using his Karma and Rasengan. While the Funato retreat, Sarada and Iwabe try to close Kagura's wound, but it proves to be fatal. He asks everyone to protect his village while giving his written request to free his comrades to Hebiichigo and dies with a smile on his face. Meanwhile, as Isari tries talking him down, Tenma considers attacking Chojuro personally in order for his adoptive father Araumi to finally recognize his strength. Boruto's team questions whether he is alright after using the Karma, but he calms down them, citing that Momoshiki can't take over because of Amado's pills. At night, Tenma decides to leave to kill Chojuro, who was lying in wait with his forces and easily corners him. Refusing to divulge any information, the wounded Funato lunges at the Mizukage, but Chojuro cuts Tenma down effortlessly and begins the assault on the Funato ships.
247	"For Kagura"; Transliteration: "Kagura no Tame ni" (Japanese: かぐらのために)	Akira Shimizu	Hideto Tanaka	May 1, 2022
After the Funato destroyed their food reserves during the attack, Team Denki decides to go out for food. Boruto and Kawaki suggest going on the offensive, but Sarada opposes leaving the village defenseless. Isari reports to Araumi about Tenma's demise with the latter deciding to personally take command, blaming Isari for Tenma and Seiren's conditions. With their rations low, the villagers forgo eating for the shinobis' sake, but due to Hebiichigo's initiative, the shinobi give their food to the children, having had no appetite since Kagura's death. Metal tells Hebiichigo that he knew she was actually kind, and Hebiichigo reveals she fed the kids because they reminded her of her childhood. Explaining that she was only ever praised once in her life for accidentally killing a rogue shinobi, she believes to only be good at killing. Metal instead inspires her to be better. Kawaki and Boruto strengthen their resolve to defeat Funamushi once and for all for Kagura. While out scavenging for food, Iwabe and Denki are captured by Funamushi's squad. Funamushi receives Araumi's orders to cancel the ambush, but he refuses to leave without avenging Seiren and succeeding with the ambush on the Mist.
248	"Another Fierce Battle"; Transliteration: "Shitō, Futatabi" (Japanese: 死闘、再び)	Masayuki Matsumoto	Atsushi Nishiyama	May 8, 2022
Thanks to Mitsuki's surveillance, the group tracks down Funamushi and learn of Iwabe and Denki's capture. The group prepares themselves for another battle. Boruto and Kawaki prepare to avenge Kagura themselves while the others fight the Funato. From the time he met Suigetsu, Boruto deduces that Funamushi is vulnerable to Lightning Style when he clads his body in thick water armor and electrocutes him. As soon as it starts raining however, Funamushi uses the water to create a huge jellyfish to overwhelm the duo. While everyone else distracts him, Hebiichigo is able to immobilize Funamushi, giving Boruto the chance to finish him. Funamushi rages on, managing to break free from Hebiichigo's hold and gravely injures her. Boruto still manages to surprise him and knock him out of with a Rasengan. Funamushi tries to take Boruto hostage as a last resort, but Buntan quickly kills him before he could do anything. The remaining Funato troops run off. Celebrations are cut short as Hebiichigo's injures prove to be far to grave. Before passing, she thanks Metal for believing in her and is buried next to Kagura.
249	"Burgeoning Hatred"; Transliteration: "Nikushimi no Me" (Japanese: 憎しみの芽)	Shigetaka Ikeda	Kyōko Katsuya	May 15, 2022
Metal, Sarada, Boruto, and Mitsuki have gone out to search for Denki and Iwabe, who have been gone for three days. During their search, they capture one of Funamushi's soldiers. The villagers, Buntan, and Kyoho argue that they should kill him and move on to help crush Araumi's forces, but the Leaf shinobi do not want to leave without finding Iwabe and Denki. Surprisingly, Denki and Metal return on their own, detailing their escape to the group and how Funamushi spared them. Boruto goes out at night and takes his anger out on Funato stragglers, only stopping himself from killing a Funato kid revealed to be Funamushi's son, Kobuna. As Boruto's teammates step in, Kobuna escapes. Sarada comforts Boruto as the latter questions his actions. When they return, they find Buntan about to torture the captive Funato for information as everyone else watches. Boruto expresses his thoughts the point of fighting the Funato, starting an argument with everyone. Amused by this, the captive reveals that Kobuna isn't his only enemy and reveals that Ikada is Seiren's little brother, shocking Boruto.
250	"The Blood of the Funato"; Transliteration: "Funato no Chi" (Japanese: 舟戸の血)	Ema Saitō	Masaya Honda	May 22, 2022
Ikada tends to Seiren just as Kobuna comes to visit, and the two question their motivations and resolve. Araumi and Isari barge in demanding that Ikada join the battle and let someone else tend to Seiren. While discussing their approach to the war, Isari argues with his father about defeating the Mist on sea, despite the lack of manpower. Araumi storms out and swims to the depths to his wife Minamo, who was frozen solid by an attack from the Mist years ago. He returns when Funamushi's body arrives, and a survivor tells the Funato family what transpired. Ikada tries calming the grieving Kobuna, angering Araumi because of his lack of resolve to avenge his family. After running away from his father, Isari tracks Ikada down and reveals that Seiren is on her deathbed because she went for Ikada instead of continuing her mission. Seiren wakes up dazed and tries to leave until her wound reopens. Ikada comforts her in her final moments, saying that her ambush mission was a success, and the Mist was destroyed by him and Araumi personally. Kobuna heads for the island to avenge his dad and meet Boruto for the first time. Isari secretly decides to make peace with the Mist in order for the clan to survive. Ikada, fueled by grief, gives in to his father's demands.
251	"Their Resolve"; Transliteration: "Futari no Ketsui" (Japanese: 二人の決意)	Tazumi Mukaiyama	Masahiro Ōkubo	May 29, 2022
Chojuro learns of Kagura and Hebiichigo's demise, fueling his anger towards the Funato Clan until Isari and his right-hand man, Jibiki arrive to talk peace. Just as Isari and Chojuro were about to negotiate, Araumi contacts the Mist and reveals that the Funato fleet is coming to destroy them. Araumi exclaims that they will eliminate anyone who would stop them, even family as he kills Isari by controls his own weapon from afar. Araumi then hands over the spotlight to Ikada, who declares that he will take revenge on the Mist. After listening to their broadcast, Boruto blames himself for driving Ikada to such extremes. Metal and Kawaki agree with Buntan and Kyoho, that all Funato need to be taken down, including Ikada. Mitsuki opens Boruto's eyes to the fact that he can only get Ikada back as a friend if they stop the war. Buntan and Kyoho try to stop Team Sarada from going to Chojuro, because they want to continue their revenge, but Iwabe and Denki hold them off, while Metal is on the fence. The Funato fleet is about to enter battle with the Mizukage's forces.
252	"The Desire to Believe"; Transliteration: "Shinjiru Kimochi" (Japanese: 信じる気持ち)	Rokō Ogiwara	Tōko Machida	June 5, 2022
Kajiki shows up at the port to take Team Sarada out to sea in order to stop the war. As Ikada leads the fleet through the storm, Araumi ponders on the fates of his children. Chojuro is swept up by his desire for revenge. Team Sarada arrives to deliver Hiramekarei and Boruto tries to dissuade Chojuro from continuing the war. Revealing Isari's death to them, Chojuro believes it was a failed attempt on his life and declares that the Funato will be stopped no matter what. After Boruto reveals that Ikada is his friend, relating him to how Kagura was, Chojuro gives him a chance to talk Ikada down. Meanwhile, Metal manages to talk Buntan, Kyoho and his teammates down from further fighting, persuading them to go after Boruto. Araumi and Chojuro both give a rousing speech to their respective armies.
253	"Conflicting Feelings"; Transliteration: "Aiirenai Omoi" (Japanese: 相容れない想い)	Mitsuo Hashimoto	Tōko Machida Atsushi Nishiyama	June 12, 2022
Team Sarada arrives at the Funato flagship and Boruto tries to talk to Ikada, but the latter immediately sinks their ship, forcing them aboard. Boruto blurts out that Chojuro promised to pull back, should the Funato retreat, though Ikada and Araumi are unconvinced. Boruto tries to reason with Ikada, bringing up his dreams, but Ikada rages at Boruto because of Seiren's death, unleashing his powers to control the sea. Team Denki, Buntan and Kyoho head out to rejoin Team Sarada and fight. Ikada swears to shed more blood from the Mist to compensate for the losses the Funato have suffered. Tenma's repaired mobile fortress arrives to destroy the Shinonome. Araumi goes to board the fortress while Kawaki follows him. Ikada angrily dispels any attempt of reason and brings out Kobuna. Finally, Ikada proposes to stop the war if Boruto brings him Chojuro's head. Sarada and Mitsuki finally see that there is no point to reason anymore. Boruto attempts to give his own life instead of Chojuro.
254	"The Spiral of Revenge"; Transliteration: "Fukushū no Uzu" (Japanese: 復讐の渦)	Ryūta Yamamoto	Atsushi Nishiyama	June 19, 2022
Ikada seems to consider Boruto's offer of self-sacrifice, but only if Sarada and Mitsuki stand by and watch, which they refuse to. Boruto convinces them to stand down and the Funato begin beating him to death. Ikada gives Kobuna the opportunity for the killing blow, but once Boruto sees how shaken up the child is, he decides to jump into the stormy sea himself. Mitsuki and Sarada break down while Ikada tries to taunt them to avenge Boruto. Seeing their resolve to not take revenge, Ikada jumps in to rescue Boruto. As Team Sarada rejoices, Ikada orders the retreat of the fleet. Araumi tries to fire the Chakra Cannon on the Shinonome regardless, but Kawaki barges in and slices his throat, incapacitating him. Boruto and Ikada talk like friends once more, while Buntan, Metal and Kyoho let go of their vengefulness.
255	"A Tricky Assignment"; Transliteration: "Yakkai na Shukudai" (Japanese: 厄介な宿題)	JOL-chan	Masahiro Ōkubo	June 26, 2022
Having returned to the Leaf, Naruto congratulates Team Sarada for their efforts in the Mist. Shikamaru explains that Araumi and Jibiki have been imprisoned, while Ikada's fate is unclear. Kawaki criticizes Boruto's naivete and his views on the war, before storming off. Running into Team Denki, he realizes they are just as childish as Boruto. Naruto relates to Boruto's struggles about wars and suggests he should patch things up with Kawaki. Buntan and Kyoho bid farewell to Kagura and Hebiichigo at their graves, having regained their freedom. Buntan decides to return to the Mist while Kyoho stays behind in Kagura's village. Chojuro decides that Ikada, having played a vital role in stopping the war, is to be punished with continuous surveillance done by Kajiki. Sarada and Boruto approach Kawaki to talk things out, but the two end up sparring as Mitsuki and Naruto also show up to watch. Having exhausted themselves, Kawaki and Boruto see reason and Naruto offers to treat them all to ramen.
256	"The Ultimate Recipe"; Transliteration: "Gokujō no Reshipi" (Japanese: 極上のレシピ)	Yūsuke Onoda	Kyōko Katsuya	July 3, 2022
After having a talk with Team Sarada and seeing how well they work together, Inojin and Cho-Cho come to the conclusion that they are dragging Shikadai down. However, the latter soon shows up with a new mission for them to capture a rogue shinobi named Jingo Kumano, wanted by the Hidden Cloud. The duo finds the target at Ten-Ten's tool shop and begin tracking him. After cornering him, Cho-Cho and Inojin are stopped by Kohan Yamanaka, who reveals that the capture order for Jingo was ordered long ago, and he has since been pardoned. Jingo now works at a ramen shop in the village, enthralling Cho-Cho. Meanwhile, Shikadai is on a mission with jonin to capture thieves. After accidentally mixing the stolen tools with Jingo's ingredients while on the run, the thieves break into the chef's shop. Shikadai's mission converges with Cho-Cho and Inojin's and together they bring the thieves down, realizing that they do still work well together.
257	"Konohamaru Becomes the Hokage?!"; Transliteration: "Hokage ni Natta Konohamaru!?" (Japanese: 火影になった木ノ葉丸!？)	Naoki Kotani	Hideto Tanaka	July 10, 2022
Naruto is asked to appear in a Kagemasa movie as himself but cannot because of his pre-existing plans with his family. Konohamaru volunteers to play him and helps out in the movie's production while also learning about the concept of movies. However, Gongorou Kamakura, the actor playing Kagemasa has to drop out because of back pains, causing several problems for the movie. While in-character as Naruto, Konohamaru steps in to diffuse a hostage situation, with the camera crew of the movie filming him live. Seeing the news, Kamakura is inspired to step in as well, stopping the criminals together. The movie is eventually completed, thanks to Konohamaru.
258	"The Uzumaki Family's Hot Springs Vacation"; Transliteration: "Uzumaki-ke no Onsen Ryokō" (Japanese: うずまき家の温泉旅行)	Takeshi Yoshimoto	Tōko Machida	July 17, 2022
The Uzumaki family arrives at the hot springs though Kawaki seems wary of the old inn, so Boruto concludes that he must be scared of ghosts. Mirai learns from Shikamaru that they are staying at the same haunted inn she visited with Guy and Kakashi. Boruto and Kawaki team up to challenge Hinata and Naruto to a ping-pong match with Himawari serving as referee. Naruto and Hinata are victorious, having overwhelmed their children. Whilst bathing in the hot springs, Kawaki realizes that he's glad he came after all. While Himawari plays cards with her parents, Kawaki and Boruto venture off to explore the inn while the ghost that haunted Guy stalks them. Before leaving, the family receives a commemorative photo, and the spirit shows up on it, spooking the boys.
259	"A Wound That Never Heals"; Transliteration: "Ienai Kizu" (Japanese: 癒えない傷)	Akira Shimizu	Kyōko Katsuya	July 24, 2022
Team Sarada investigates a series of attacks targeting ex-shinobi at night. After seeing a couple cats on patrol, Mitsuki reveals that his cat Mikazuki has been missing since the Funato attack. Wandering around, Mitsuki finds a musician named Hibiki with Mikazuki. She explains that, in his absence, Mikazuki got injured and found itself at Hibiki's, where she took care of her. The two go for a walk, but Mitsuki soon breaks off, once Hibiki's older brother comes by, who seems to hate shinobi. While investigating again, Mitsuki catches the criminals in the act, forcing them to flee. He tracks them to Hibiki and her brother's food stand, where he realizes that they are the assailants, but he tells the others that the criminals fled to the rooftops. Mitsuki persuades Hibiki to reveal their reasons and learn that they are searching for the thief who murdered their father. The thief has a scar left by their father before dying. Team Sarada arrives just in time to save Hibiki and her brother from the real killer. Having helped in apprehending a killer, Hibiki and her brother are allowed to leave the Leaf Village but are banned from returning.
260	"Fireworks of Love"; Transliteration: "Koi no Uchiage Hanabi" (Japanese: 恋の打ち上げ花火)	Yūta Suzuki	Atsushi Nishiyama	July 31, 2022
Kakashi asks Boruto to help him out in his daily activities. While Kakashi suggests they stand by, Boruto steps in to stop a fight between two elderly vendors. Boruto learns from the granddaughter of one of the vendors that the dispute came from the preemptive Firework display of the new section of the Leaf Village, since the old borough used to fire them off first, once the festival starts. Kakashi agrees to help sort the problem out, since the granddaughter has a really rare first-edition volume of Jiraiya's Makeout Tactics he hasn't read yet. Boruto and Kakashi convince both sides to have a sit-down. When arguments break out, Kakashi figures out a way to stop the infighting on the festival day. He switches the fireworks of both parties, who realize that the fireworks were beautiful either way. Kakashi receives the book from the granddaughter of the Old Town vendor while she marries the grandson of the New City Vendor.

== Home media release ==
=== Japanese ===
Aniplex (Japan, Region 2)
DVD	Release date	Discs	Episodes	DVD-BOX	Release date	Discs	Episodes
53	February 2, 2022	1	209–212	12	April 6, 2022	4	206–220
54	March 2, 2022	1	213–216	12	April 6, 2022	4	206–220
55	April 6, 2022	1	217–220	12	April 6, 2022	4	206–220
56	May 11, 2022	1	221–223	13	August 3, 2022	4	221–232
57	June 1, 2022	1	224–226	13	August 3, 2022	4	221–232
58	July 6, 2022	1	227–229	13	August 3, 2022	4	221–232
59	August 3, 2022	1	230–232	13	August 3, 2022	4	221–232
60	September 7, 2022	1	233–235	14	December 7, 2022	4	233–246
61	October 5, 2022	1	236–238	14	December 7, 2022	4	233–246
62	November 2, 2022	1	239–241	14	December 7, 2022	4	233–246
63	December 7, 2022	1	242–246	14	December 7, 2022	4	233–246
64	January 11, 2023	1	247–249	15	April 5, 2023	4	247–260
65	February 1, 2023	1	250–252	15	April 5, 2023	4	247–260
66	March 1, 2023	1	253–256	15	April 5, 2023	4	247–260
67	April 5, 2023	1	257–260	15	April 5, 2023	4	247–260

=== English ===
Viz Media (North America, Region A / 1)
Set	Release date	Discs	Episodes	Ref.
14	January 10, 2023	3	190–210	
15	June 13, 2023	3	211–231	
16	November 14, 2023	3	232–255	
17	March 26, 2024	3	256–273	
