= Boruto: Naruto Next Generations episodes 261–293 =

- Series 6
- Cover of the sixteenth home media box set release of the series featuring Kawaki and Himawari Uzumaki.
- No. of episodes: 33

Release
- Original network: TV Tokyo
- Original release: August 7, 2022 – March 26, 2023

Series chronology
- ← Previous; List 5 (#209–260)

Boruto: Naruto Next Generations is a Japanese anime series based on the manga series of the same name and serves as both a spin-off and sequel to Masashi Kishimoto's Naruto. It is produced by Pierrot and broadcast on TV Tokyo. The anime is directed by Masayuki Kōda (episodes 105–281, and 287–onwards) and Noriyuki Abe (episodes 282–286) and is written by Masaya Honda (from episode 67–onwards).

Boruto follows the exploits of Naruto Uzumaki's son Boruto and his comrades from the Hidden Leaf Village's ninja academy while finding a path to follow once they grow up. Despite being based on the manga, the anime explores original storylines and adaptations of the spin-off manga, Naruto: The Seventh Hokage and the Scarlet Spring; Boruto: Naruto the Movie; as well as the Naruto Shinden light novel series.

It premiered on TV Tokyo on April 5, 2017, and aired every Wednesday at 5:55 PM JST. Starting May 3, 2018 (episode 56) it aired every Thursday at 7:25 PM JST. Starting October 7, 2018 (episode 76) it now airs every Sunday at 5:30 PM JST. The series is also being released in DVDs. Viz Media licensed the series on March 23, 2017, to simulcast it on Hulu, and on Crunchyroll. On March 9, 2023, it was announced that the series is set to finish its first part with episode 293 on March 26, 2023, and a second part was announced to be in development.

The opening theme song is "Kirarirari" by Kana-Boon (episodes 256–281) and "Shukuen" by Asian Kung-Fu Generation (episodes 282–293).

The ending theme song is "Bibōroku" by Lenny code fiction (episodes 256–268), "Ladder" by Anonymouz (episodes 269–281) and "Mata ne" by Humbreaders (episodes 282–293).

== Episode list ==
No.	Title (Note: All English titles are taken from Crunchyroll.)	Directed by	Written by	Original release date
261	"Kawaki Enters the Ninja Academy!"; Transliteration: "Kawaki, Akademī Nyūgaku!!" (Japanese: カワキ、忍者学校(アカデミー)入学!!)	Masayuki Matsumoto	Kō Shigenobu	August 7, 2022
Himawari and Kawaki attend the academy entrance ceremony, where Iruka and Naruto welcome them. In reality, Kawaki was entrusted a top-secret mission to guard Kae Yukiwari, the princess of the Land of Bamboo, a small neighboring country. Assassins aim to kill her, so that the king of the land would be forced to choose another successor. Only Iruka knows about Kawaki's mission at the academy. After class introductions, Himawari and her friends get to know Kae better. Following Naruto's advice to become friends with Kae to guard her, Kawaki invites her to eat taiyaki, and everyone misunderstands it as him hitting on her. Kawaki's efforts prove fruitless, but Himawari advises him to talk about romance novels, as Kae loves them. Kawaki trails Kae to the rooftop afternoon, and they begin to connect. Eiki Fuuma, the son of police chief Koutarou, keeps trying to impress Kae and prove that Kawaki is dangerous, so he steals a summoning scroll and tries to "protect" Kae from Kawaki. Eiki loses control of the summoning and is knocked out, but Kawaki defeats it and earns Kae's friendship. Back home, Himawari overhears Kawaki reporting his mission progress to Naruto.
262	"The Princess's Tea Party"; Transliteration: "Ohime-sama no Ochakai" (Japanese: お姫様のお茶会)	Ayumu Ono	Kō Shigenobu	August 14, 2022
Himawari offers to help Kawaki protect Kae. Eiki warns Kawaki, that he plans to expose his true identity eventually. Kae confides in Kawaki that she plans to host an event for the entire school. Himawari prepares Kawaki for the tea party. At the party, Eiki calls out Kawaki as the others are appalled by his presence. Kawaki and Himawari try to convince the others, that the former loves tea and all kinds of sweets. Himawari boasts about Gaara being close friends with Naruto and coming over often. The class ends up liking Kawaki more, after he opens up to Kae's questions. However, Kawaki soon suspects the cake is poisoned, so he trashes it in front of everyone, saddening the princess. While Himawari distracts the others, Kawaki is able to discover, that though the cake was not poisoned, it was tampered with. He exposes Osuka Kamakura, the self-absorbed daughter of Kagemasa actor Gongoro as the culprit. Kae snaps at Osuka, and the latter breaks down and apologizes. Realizing that the class is accepting of her true self, Kae is gladdened. Kawaki provides everyone with taiyaki to make up for the cake.
263	"Bloom, Hana! The Teacher's Gifts"; Transliteration: "Hana Hirake!! Kyōshi no Sainō" (Japanese: 花開け!!教師の才能)	Rokō Ogiwara	Kyōko Katsuya	August 21, 2022
On the way to the academy, Himawari and Kawaki discuss the upcoming arrival of special instructors. In class, Kawaki is shocked that the special instructors are Team Sarada. Boruto enjoys being Kawaki's "teacher" and teases him about it. The actual class teacher, Hana Kaka is embarrassed that her class is so amazed by the flashy jutsus demonstrated by Team Sarada, while she is incapable of using jutsu of such magnitude. As the class starts feeling hungry, Boruto sets down some Thunder Burgers and explains that the class shall play a game, where they have to get the burgers from each other. However, the game splinters the class instead of tightening their relations. Kawaki and Himawari find Kae alone in class, as no one wants to see the kids from the opposing faction. Boruto tries to get the infighting to stop, by having them play Ninja Cards, but when that doesn't work, Kawaki steps in to buy them off with taiyaki, which also doesn't work. Hana looks into the kids' admission papers and figures out how to soothe things over and the next day, the kids return to school. The class celebrates together and sit down for a picnic.
264	"The Seven Mysteries Investigative Team Forms!"; Transliteration: "Nana Fushigi Tanken-tai Kessei!!" (Japanese: 七不思議探検隊結成!!)	Tazumi Mukaiyama	Atsushi Nishiyama	August 28, 2022
The class discusses a certain mirror within the academy, which is said to drag people into another world through it. Himawari proposes that they explore the academy at night. Since Kae joins in on Himawari's proposal, Kawaki is forced to go as well. Shino allows them to stay if they finish up their training first, to clean the floors. Kawaki questions Kae's maturity but she reveals she doesn't believe in some mystery existing at the academy, but she wants to uphold the other kids' beliefs. Therefore, she and her butler have decided to fake the mysteries in a way that they appear real to the kids. Kawaki joins them in order to not ruin Himawari's fun. The three of them successfully provide a few scary thrills for Himawari's group. In the end, most of the kids are scared off and by the time Himawari reaches the mirror, only her friends Yuina and Ehou remain. However, both parties are surprised when a supposedly real ghost appears. Kawaki, Kae and her butler successfully trap it, revealed to be Shino, who has stayed after hours to clean up the academy with the help of his bugs. Kawaki questions whether Himawari has actually figured them out with her Byakugan, and she lets it slip that she did eventually realize what they were doing.
265	"Team Rivalry: Practical Skills Training!"; Transliteration: "Chīmu Taikō, Jitsugi Jisshū!!" (Japanese: チーム対抗、実技実習!!)	Ema Saitō	Tōko Machida	September 4, 2022
Hana sensei decides the class should have a practice training session in a nearby forest, so she has the class split up into teams of three. Though Himawari ends up on the same team as Kae, Kawaki gets separated. Their first exercise is a race to walk up trees and retrieve all the pieces of paper placed by the teacher. Kae's team ends up in second place, after Eiki's, while Kawaki's team ends up in last place, due to Kawaki jumping off the tree to help Kae. After a couple more exercises, the class begins preparing the food for camping. Kae trails off to be alone, but Himawari finds her before a flame bear could attack her. Kae's other teammate leads Kawaki after them. Hana Sensei steps in and stalls the bear in the meantime, allowing Kae and Himawari to escape. The bear overpowers Hana, but Kawaki arrives just in time to effortlessly beat the bear and berate the teacher for her weakness. Kae's team wins the last exercise, and Kawaki congratulates Himawari for protecting Kae.
266	"Himawari Kidnapped!"; Transliteration: "Himawari Yūkai Jiken" (Japanese: ヒマワリ誘拐事件)	Ōri Yasukawa	Masahiro Ōkubo	September 11, 2022
Himawari tells Kawaki, that she is going shopping with Kae and her butler. Right outside the gate of the academy, two masked assailants kidnap Himawari and her classmate Osuka. Kawaki runs into Kae and her butler, discovering Himawari's pendant dropped on the ground, so they begin investigating. Kawaki and Kae find the ransom note at Osuka's house, which was delivered by the leader of the criminals. At night, Himawari breaks free and fights the leader, using her Byakugan, but he gains the upper hand and recaptures her. Kawaki breaks through the roof and saves Himawari and Osuka, leaving them in the care of Kae and her butler. Kawaki easily defeats the ringleader, after which he gives Himawari her pendant back. While the Police Force leads the culprits away, a mysterious figure surveys Kae from the trees.
267	"Kawaki's Cover Blown?!"; Transliteration: "Kawaki, Shōtai Hakkaku!?" (Japanese: カワキ、正体発覚！？)	Yūsuke Onoda	Hideto Tanaka	September 18, 2022
The class acts out a reenactment of the history of the village. Himawari gets to play her grandfather, Minato and Kawaki ends up as Katsuyu, while Kae plays Tsunade and Eiki plays Jiraiya. Kawaki has a heart-to-heart with Kae, and how the play has affected her. She wants to stay with her friends forever, something which she found out Orochimaru couldn't do after his exile years ago. Meanwhile, Eiki learns that Kawaki is a genin and attempts to steal his real headband for the play, with the help of one of his classmates. During the play rehearsals, Eiki makes his move. Unfortunately for everyone else, he accidentally ruins the stage, forcing Kawaki to step in and save everyone. He makes Eiki see the consequences of his rash actions and he finally apologizes. Together, the class fixes the stage, but Kawaki loses his headband. Osuka finds it and returns it, having overheard Eiki with their classmate earlier in the day. Eiki comes up to Himawari and Kawaki, apologizing again. He shows them a note he received anonymously, which reveals Kawaki's identity. Kawaki hurries off to Kae's aid, who was about to be murdered by an assassin sent by the Minister of her country, who has conspirators aiming to get her younger brother on the throne, instead of her.
268	"Target: The School Festival"; Transliteration: "Nerawareta Gakuensai" (Japanese: 狙われた学園祭)	Ryūta Yamamoto	Kō Shigenobu	September 25, 2022
Kawaki chases the assassin away, awakening Kae. Kawaki soothes her worries and escorts her back to her compound. He postpones his report to Naruto about the attempt on Kae's life, so that she could enjoy the coming school festival. The students are preparing for the festival, while the history play is coming along nicely as well. Seeing that things have gotten actually dangerous, Kawaki decides to leave Himawari out of the loop. Boruto and all of his former classmates show up for the festival as well. During the final rehearsal, Hana Sensei is struck with intense headaches, forcing her to go to the infirmary. Kawaki is set off, when he learns that Kae's butler is otherwise indisposed and begins looking for cloaked figures in the crowd, unaware of the actual cloaked figure watching from the rooftops. During the play, Kawaki and the teachers receive letters, that numerous paper bombs have been placed on school grounds, rigged to explode within 20 minutes. Shino, as well as Boruto and his former classmates all begin disarming the paper bombs. Meanwhile, Ehou informs their class, that Eiki has stayed behind to disarm a large cluster of paper bombs. Kawaki elects to go help, leaving Kae in Himawari's care. Kawaki arrives in time to disarm the main paper bomb and save Eiki. In the meantime, the assassin hits the class with smoke bombs, but Himawari steps in and takes Kae away, before she could be killed. As soon as Kawaki arrives to protect Kae, the assassin covers his escape with the detonation of many paper bombs, which in turn injure Hana Sensei. Kae starts to question whether Kawaki is there just to protect her.
269	"The Sneaking Shadow"; Transliteration: "Shinobiyoru Kage" (Japanese: 忍び寄る影)	Yūji Kanzaki	Kyōko Katsuya	October 2, 2022
The class visits Hana sensei in the hospital, bringing her gifts. Kawaki is chewed out by Shikamaru for not reporting about the assassin. Naruto takes Kawaki off the case and assigns Sai and the Police Force the mission to find them. Kae is being prepared for her return to the Land of Bamboo. Kawaki and Himawari decide to team up with Eiki in order to cathc the culprit before Kae would be sent away, since his uncle is Koutarou the chief of the Police Force. Kae wants to hear the truth about Kawaki's mission from his own mouth. Himawari discovers Kae's butler Batora on one of the festival photos, despite him refusing to come initially. Leaving Eiki, Kawaki and Himawari storm off to Kae's, to protect her from Batora. By the time they arrive however, the assassin is there and has already wounded the butler. Kawaki faces off against the assassin in the woods, cornering the assassin to the point, that they blow themself up. Upon Kawaki's query, Batora reveals that he was secretly investigating the possibility that Kae's enemies are already in the village. Naruto overlooks Kawaki's earlier failure to report, since he excelled in his mission instead, while Shikamaru explains that Batora's investigations revealed the mastermind as a minister from the Land of Bamboo and the guardian of Kae's stepbrother. Kawaki is left feeling suspicious about whether it's all over now.
270	"Two Sides of the Same Coin"; Transliteration: "Hyōri Ittai" (Japanese: 表裏一体)	Naoki Kotani	Tōko Machida	October 9, 2022
Kawaki remains suspicious about the assassins being done and accompanies Himawari to the academy. Hana sensei returns from the infirmary as well. The class prepares a "welcome back" surprise for her. After class, Hana sensei ponders on what Shino and Anko told her about the incidents at the academy, as well as who targeted Kae and why. She further questions her own actions during the events, and why she cannot seem to remember them. Upon seeing Kawaki in the afternoon, she suddenly remembers puppeteering the disguised academy bomber. She finds her own secret hideout, where a sort of separate personality emerges from within, who tells Hana, that she was raised by the minister of the Land of Bamboo to be an assassin, like many more and sent to the Leaf after the Fourth Great Shinobi War. Hana's assassin self takes over the teacher self permanently, in order to carry out her mission. Kawaki remains vigilant, asking Kae if he and Himawari could investigate her house once more.
271	"The Island of Treachery"; Transliteration: "Uragiri no Shima" (Japanese: 裏切りの島)	Mitsuo Hashimoto	Masahiro Ōkubo	October 16, 2022
Hana sensei takes the class to an uninhabited island that used to function as training ground for the Leaf. The students begin talking about a rumor that a Rogue Shinobi fled to this island after finding some traps. Ehou discovers that their food is missing from the baggages and Hana says that no one will come to the island until the next day to take them back. Himawari takes a group to search for food, while Kawaki stays with Kae. After the Inuzuka kid's pet dog is injured and Neon's drone is destroyed, Kawaki takes the initiative to tell everyone to stick together and not to wander into the woods. At night, Kawaki's investigation is interrupted by Kae's questioning. He tells her about his hunch, that there still is an assassin after her. Neon is able to show Kawaki and Himawari the last of the drone's feed. Kawaki notices that for a brief moment, Hana's Wind Style flower petals appear on screen and tells Himawari about. Meanwhile, Hana leads Kae away into the woods and kidnaps her. Kawaki and Himawari follow them to a bridge, where Hana stabs Kae.
272	"Students Unite!"; Transliteration: "Seito Danketsu!!" (Japanese: 生徒団結!!)	Yūta Suzuki	Kyōko Katsuya	October 23, 2022
After stabbing Kae, Hana uses Fire Style to destroy the bridge and escape into the woods. The rest of the class arrives, having heard the explosion and Kawaki tells them that Hana killed Kae. Himawari questions Hana's actions, as to why an assassin would purposefully kill their target in front of others, so they theorize that it was a fake-out and that Hana is still holding Kae hostage for some reason. Everyone decides to pull together and save Kae as a team. In a cave nearby, Kae awakens as Hana tells her, that she is waiting for her associates to hand Kae over, after which they would go to jailbreak the arrested minister. The kids use ropes to climb over the ravine and search for Hana. They are able to find Hana's tracks together, where Kawaki stops the others and reveals that he's a shinobi. Kawaki heads off, followed by Himawari. As Hana waits for her associates, Kawaki steps in to fight her.
273	"Farewell, Academy!"; Transliteration: "Saraba Akademī!!" (Japanese: さらば忍者学校(アカデミー)!!)	Yūichirō Aoki	Kō Shigenobu	October 30, 2022
Hana reveals her disorder to her opponents and uses Fire Style to force Kawaki and Himawari into cover. Kawaki and Himawari attempt to strike from multiple directions, but Hana traps them and Kae in a Wind Style jutsu. Himawari uses her Byakugan to track Hana, while Kawaki shields her. They manage to overpower Hana, just as the other students arrive with Sai and Kae's butler. Sai tells Hana, that ANBU Black Ops have already arrested her associates. Hana's teacher personality resurfaces to stop her from blowing herself up with the kids. With the inspiration of her students, Hana is able to overcome her assassin personality. Kawaki reports to Naruto, who commends him for his performance. Shikamaru explains that Hana is receiving medical care, after which she would like to continue teaching. Meanwhile, Kae bids the class farewell, by performing the play about the history of the village, and Kawaki arrives a bit late to participate as well. The next day, Kae is seen off by the class as she leaves home. At the Uzumaki homestead, Himawari tells her family about her consideration of becoming a shinobi, due to how much she enjoys being at the academy with the class.
274	"A Flightless Hawk"; Transliteration: "Tobenai Taka" (Japanese: 翔べない鷹)	Akira Shimizu	Masaya Honda	November 6, 2022
Sarada learns from Sakura that Sasuke is taking Boruto with him to find a replacement messenger hawk, since his current one is being retired due to old age. Sasuke and Boruto go on the search for Maruta, a keeper of legendary hawks. Finding a small gaudy settlement in a valley, Sasuke and Boruto run off after a supposed security chief attempt to catch them. They run into the mountains, where they encounter an old man, initially assumes they're with the security chief. The old man then tells them, that the fancy place called Paradise, led by a woman named Mozu Shitakiri is capturing and selling rare animals. Boruto asks why the old man would be targeted by them, and the latter says he knows where the legendary hawks are, making him Maruta. Sasuke and Boruto enter Paradise under the guise of customers. Mozu welcomes them, after Boruto recognizes his friend Tentou, the son of the Feudal Lord of the Land of Fire on a painting. As Mozu takes them on a tour, Boruto questions why she'd threaten people to hand over their rare animals and they are thrown out. Boruto encounters Tsuzura, Mozu's son, playing with a white hawk and befriends him. Meanwhile, Maruta leads Sasuke to his den of hawks, where Sasuke receives his new messenger hawk. Mozu catches her son together with Boruto and has his hawk taken away.
275	"Into the Sky Again"; Transliteration: "Futatabi Sora e" (Japanese: 再び空へ)	Yūji Kanzaki	Masaya Honda	November 13, 2022
Mozu lectures her son about the value of animals. Boruto tells Sasuke about Tsuzura. Tsuzura is horrified to learn his mother is about to sell his hawk to a client who wants to stuff it. He decides to run off with the hawk to the rendezvous point with Boruto. When Mozu and her security catch up, Sasuke decides to trade his hawk he got from Maruta, so that Tsuzura could keep his white hawk. However, Sasuke actually tricked them and used genjutsu on his hawk, to give it the goal to escape back to him. Sasuke and Boruto leave Tsuzura at Maruta's place to settle in. Sasuke reveals to Boruto, that he is staying to deal with Mozu, and after that he is leaving the village to track down Code, the last active Inner in Kara. The two-part ways and Boruto gets on the Thunder Train going back to the Leaf. As the train enters a tunnel though, Boruto awakes to find himself in some sort of lab, surrounded by many people from different countries.
276	"Welcome to the Maze"; Transliteration: "Meikyū e Yōkoso" (Japanese: 迷宮へようこそ)	Nozomi Fukui	Masaya Honda	November 20, 2022
Boruto learns from a Hidden Mist bounty hunter named Anaguma that they were all on the Thunder Train, before waking in the same room, with Anaguma being transported together with his bounty, a criminal named Rokuro. Boruto also meets Kiseru Gankubi, a fellow Hidden Leaf shinobi. A chipper old man enters the room and exclaims that he wants to conduct tests on them before letting them go, to see why they survived the accident that destroyed the train, while the other passengers didn't. One of the Mist shinobi volunteers for the old man's test but fail and are swiftly killed by him with his puppet hand. The old man, Ouga reveals that they are actually in his secret underground maze, created to experiment with people's lives. He also tells them, that if they do not pass his five tests, they will never leave the maze. The first test begins, the captives must climb up to safety, before the floor could collapse under them. Many succeed in reaching the top, but Rokuro is able to set himself free, while Anaguma falls to his death. Ouga congratulates the survivors and tells them to rest before the next test.
277	"Disappearing Lives"; Transliteration: "Kieru Inochi" (Japanese: 消える命)	Yūsuke Onoda	Atsushi Nishiyama	November 27, 2022
Boruto tries to unite the group, but the survivors' opposing morals clash too much. Rokuro exposes a Hidden Grass shinobi as Ouga's spy within the group, so Ouga kills him with a curse mark as he appears to give them the next test. The group finds themselves in a dark room for the next test. Ouga reveals that they must reach the exit of this room, while making sure their candles stay lit, whilst avoiding traps. Meanwhile, Sarada and Mitsuki have begun investigating the disappearance of the train Boruto was on. Ouga explains, that to advance through the final stage of the test, the survivors must extinguish each other's candles, as only half the remaining people may live. While Rokuro's group goes through with the halfing of the survivors, Boruto's group comes up with the idea to combine their candles, so one long candle would belong to all of them, therefore bypassing Ouga's stipulations. Ouga is surprised by this but allows the survivors to move on from this test. During this, Mitsuki and Sarada corner the Bullet Train worker that helped capture people for Ouga's experiments, but he accidentally blows himself up in one of Ouga's traps before he could have talked.
278	"Musical Chairs"; Transliteration: "Isutori Gēmu" (Japanese: 椅子取りゲーム)	Ema Saitō	Masaya Honda	December 4, 2022
Boruto calms down the arguing survivors and they begin opening up to each other. Ouga appears and makes them choose the next experiment. Meanwhile, Sarada talks to Kawaki about the missing train passengers, as Mitsuki keeps investigating. The group of survivors find themselves in a sealed room where the spiked ceiling is slowly coming down on them. Boruto realizes that the floor beneath them is thin, so they begin trying to break through it. The plan succeeds and they all get out of the room alive, earning Ouga's praise. Batta, a Hidden Cloud kunoichi secretly tells Boruto about her suspicion that there still might be a mole working for Ouga among the eight survivors, showing a communication device she found. Sarada and Kawaki's investigation into the train passengers reveals that Kiseru is actually an Outer for Kara.
279	"The Obstacle: Seven"; Transliteration: "Nana no Kabe" (Japanese: 七の壁)	Masayuki Matsumoto	Masaya Honda	December 11, 2022
Batta explains her suspicions regarding Kiseru to Boruto. Elsewhere, Kawaki and Sarada join Mitsuki in the investigation. By the time Boruto and Batta return to the others, the next experiment has already begun, and they are both given envelopes like the others, before Ouga teleports them away by themselves. Ouga explains, that each envelope contains a numbered tag from 1 to 8 and they need to obtain a total of 7 points from each other to pass, all within two hours. Kiseru realizes his communication device is missing, realizing that Batta might have taken it in their earlier altercation. Boruto, Yatsume, Shamo and the criminal-turned monk Namua meet and add their numbers up. Afterwards, they find Batta, and the businessman Fugou murdered, before Rokuro arrives with their tags, demanding a fight. Sarada and Kawaki find Mitsuki tied up in a trap, who explains that he was attacked by rogue shinobi after being freed. Namua takes a hit for Boruto, so that he could take Rokuro down. Rokuro concedes the fight and explains, that Batta and Fugou were already dead when he took their tags, leaving Kiseru as the culprit. Boruto sends the others through the exit, while he waits for Kiseru to arrive with his 7 tag.
280	"Breakthrough"; Transliteration: "Toppakō" (Japanese: 突破口)	Takeshi Yoshimoto	Atsushi Nishiyama	December 18, 2022
Boruto demands answers from Kiseru, who denies killing Batta and Fugou, before running off. Ouga tries trapping the two of them in the trap, so Namua sacrifices himself to hold the gate open, while the others re-enter. The group surrounds Kiseru, who they theorize is their ticket out of the experiment, but he uses powerful Fire Style jutsu to escape into a cave. Rokuro tries to take control of Kiseru with the parasites he used on Namua before, but Kiseru takes advantage of the wound the Rasengan gave Rokuro and overpowers him, but Boruto chases him off again. At the same time, the rest of Team Sarada are surrounded by the assailants, who trapped Mitsuki before. Kiseru attacks Yatsume and Shamo as well, but they manage to hold their own with Lightning and Earth Style jutsus, respectively. Sarada realizes that the masked individuals surrounding them are Konoha ANBU investigating the mass disappearances for the Five Great Nations, and they only stopped Mitsuki before from intervening in their investigation, however they are now cleared to share information with Team Sarada. They reveal, that Kiseru is one of their agents, sent on an undercover mission as an Outer for Kara, while Shamo learns the same from the scroll Kiseru dropped, thanks to his earlier attack. Shamo rushes to stop Kiseru and Boruto's fight, since Kiseru has started to become mentally affected by the undercover mission. Shamo takes a hit for Boruto, while giving him the scroll. Kiseru begins seeing clearly again and reveals his mission. Believing the clues the ANBU received from a previous agent, who went missing, Kiseru realizes the whole ordeal is a genjutsu, so he stabs Boruto and uses healing ninjutsu, to wake him up from it. Boruto awakens in a lab, with everyone still alive, and inside pods.
281	"The Eighth Truth"; Transliteration: "Yattsume no Shinjitsu" (Japanese: 八つ目の真実)	Ayumu Ono	Masaya Honda	December 25, 2022
Boruto is met by Yatsume and Rokuro, who have also awakened from the genjutsu. The three begin exploring Ouga's complex. Boruto gets separated from the others due to several different tricks built into the hallways, after which Rokuro turns on Yatsume and escapes with the map she took off Ouga's first spy. Upon finding a way to return to the room, Boruto only finds Yatsume, who was infected by Rokuro's mind-controlling parasite. Rokuro follows the map to the exit, but he is attacked by Ouga, revealed to be a shinobi puppet. After Rokuro's insect overtakes Yatsume's body, Boruto realizes that they are still trapped in a second layer of genjutsu, but they can still escape. Frustrated with his insight, Yatsume drops the act and reveals herself as the real Ouga, as well as the eighth Inner of Kara, a cyborg created by Amado. Boruto also recognizes their location as the Kara headquarters where he saw Koji Kashin kill Jigen. She explains, that she is the only Inner Amado created by enhancing her mental capabilities, instead of physical prowess, so that she could help him in his research. She then sought to learn more about Jigen, which lead to him forcefully exiling her and removing a part of her brain. After Isshiki's demise, she began conducting her life-threatening experiments on people, in an effort to reawaken her own desire to live, which Jigen had quelled. Ouga tells Boruto to stab her, in order to finally escape the genjutsu and wake the others up as well, but Boruto hesitates, since he realizes that killing Ouga in the genjutsu might be enough to actually kill her, weakened as she is now, due to the lack of maintenance. As the genjutsu world begins collapsing, Boruto inspires Ouga to find a reason to live and wake up by herself and wake everyone else. Boruto contacts Team Sarada and the ANBU with Kiseru's comms and rejoices, upon seeing everyone else alive. Amidst the commotion of everyone being freed, Ouga escapes to pursue her dream, but promises to visit Boruto in a letter she left behind.
282	"Sasuke's Story: Infiltration"; Transliteration: "Sasuke Retsuden・Sennyū" (Japanese: サスケ烈伝・潜入)	Yūta Suzuki	Tōko Machida	January 8, 2023
While searching for information about Kara, Sasuke ventures close to the Land of Redaku, which brings forth memories. Years ago, Sasuke learned from Shikamaru that Naruto was afflicted with an unknown illness, which the Sage of Six Paths suffered from as well. Leaf researchers were the ones to discover that the Sage used to recover in the 5,000 year old Observatory in the Land of Redaku, back in ancient times. Shikamaru explained that Kakashi was sent to the Land of Redaku to search for a cure, but only ended up becoming the private tutor of the dethroned prince, Nanara. Sasuke then infiltrated the Observatory as a prisoner, since prisoners were being forced to help build a new telescope at the time. Sasuke then got into a prison brawl, instigated by arrogant prisoners, but the Director of the Observatory, Zansul stepped in to avoid punishing Sasuke. After his first day of labor, Sasuke got acquainted with his cell mates. Sasuke then escaped his cell to search the premises, but soon ran into Zansul's "guard dog", an ancient dinosaur on which genjutsu does not work, since it does not have any chakra. The next day, Zansul immediately warned Sasuke, revealing that genjutsu won't work on him either, due to his fake eyes. During Sasuke's dealings at the construction sites in the Observatory, Kakashi gained access to the library through Nanara and discovered the manuscript of the Sage of Six Paths.
283	"Sasuke's Story: Star Lines"; Transliteration: "Sasuke Retsuden・Hoshinarabe" (Japanese: サスケ烈伝・星ならべ)	Nozomi Fukui	Atsushi Nishiyama	January 15, 2023
After Zansul had the guards give Sasuke beatings regularly, his cellmates suggested that he went to the infirmary, to meet the beautiful new nurse. Instead, Sasuke snuck out of his cell at night, only to be attacked by Meno, or rather another Meno again. The creature's claws were coated in poison and one tiny scratch on Sasuke was enough to weaken him, but the new nurse, the undercover Sakura stepped in to take Sasuke away. Sakura informed Sasuke of Kakashi's efforts, and the relevant contents of the book discovered by him, which said that the Sage of Six Paths was cured by a sort of meteorite fragments, called "Ultra Particles" which he watched come down to the earth at the observatory and that a certain Map of the Heavens would lead to where these fragments could be found. Sasuke decides to partner up with his wife for the mission, but he then noticed, that his cellmate Jiji was by the door and heard they are married. Jiji gave Sasuke some marriage advice on the way back, which the latter seemed to consider. Jiji also told Sasuke that their other cellmate Penzila is on library duty and he might know of the Map. The next day, Sakura attempted to get the Map from Penzila, only to learn that it is a valuable document stored in the basement and Zansul's approval would be needed for access. Sakura challenged Penzila to a gambling match to win the key, so Penzila showed her how to play a card game called Star Lines. Sakura easily won the match, since Tsunade taught her gambling. Upon entering the library at night, Sasuke remembered Jiji's advice and shared a tender moment with Sakura, as he gave her a wedding ring. They went on to find the Map in the basement, which contained twelve ink paintings. Sasuke realized that the paintings depicted the Nine Tailed Beasts, the Ten Tails, the astronomer who built the observatory and the Sage himself. Sasuke surmised that they must check Zansul's basement, since it was the last place they hadn't looked for the particles yet, but a prisoner overheard their plan of Sakura disguising herself as the Prime Minister's messenger to steal the key from Zansul.
284	"Sasuke's Story: The Secret in the Cellar"; Transliteration: "Sasuke Retsuden・Chikashitsu no Himitsu" (Japanese: サスケ烈伝・地下室の秘密)	Yūji Kanzaki	Masahiro Ōkubo	January 22, 2023
Sasuke and his cellmates observed Meno's behaviour closely. Sakura welcomed Fandal, the Prime Minister's envoy. The latter told the former, that he was supposed to ask Zansul about the "progress", knowing nothing specific. Sakura then led him to an enclosed room for Sasuke to put him in a genjutsu, while she transformed into him. Disguised as the envoy, Sakura met with Zansul, while also sneaking in Sasuke as Fandal's cane. While Sasuke used Earth Style to create a key for Zansul's basement, Sakura asked Zansul about the progress, but the latter refused to give details to a mere envoy. Having broken into the cellar, Sasuke found an alarming number of live chicken, ancient fossils of Meno's species and an eerie altar. From these clues, Sasuke deduced that Zansul did not summon Meno, but used a version of the Reanimation Jutsu to resurrect the creature, using chicken. Having gone out a back entrance to the cellar, Sasuke was attacked by a Meno. Sasuke then used his knowledge of Reanimation type jutsus to rewrite Meno's loyalty to Zansul. Back in the cave, Zansul had the unseen inmate who overheard Sasuke and Sakura's plan reanimate a new Meno with the chicken.
285	"Sasuke's Story: The Sky that Fell to the Earth"; Transliteration: "Sasuke Retsuden・Chi ni Furishi Sora" (Japanese: サスケ烈伝・地に降りし空)	Ema Saitō	Kyōko Katsuya	January 29, 2023
Sakura received a message from Kakashi, that the Prime Minister had mobilized Redaku's army and was waiting for the arrival of Zansul's "assets". Sakura then realized that the 12 paintings correspond to Jutsu hand signs shinobi use. While working on the roof with Jiji, Sasuke noticed a nearby lake, so Jiji told him, that the lake supposedly formed in the crater of a crashed meteor long ago. Sasuke decided to leave his post after, and ran into Sakura immediately to share the new information they gained. They figured out which hand signs corresponding to the paintings they need to use, by recalling the winning hand in the Star Lines card game. They then decided to head out together after lights-out. After sharing a romantic moment by the lake, Sakura performed the jutsu to unveil the sunken Ultra Particles, igniting a beam across the sky. Just as she retrieved the sealed particles, the two were alerted by an explosion back at the observatory, which released a multitude of flying dragon beasts. While Sakura headed back to the observatory, Sasuke began trailing the flying beasts, but Zansul stepped in front of him, from atop a beast. Zansul revealed, that he was using the prisoners for his own scheme to dig up fossils and find the Ultra Particles. Zansul also denied using the Reanimation Jutsu and affirmed that he knew about Kakashi's presence at Prince Nanara's estate. After using his Sharingan, Sasuke deduced that Zansul did not have enough chakra to reanimate and control the beasts. Many more species of dragon beasts emerged from below the observatory and started to devour the inmates. Sakura punched a hole in the walls to allow the inmates to escape. While searching the observatory for Zansul and saving inmates, Sakura was stabbed by Jiji with a poisoned kunai. Afterwards, Jiji took the Ultra Particles, which are needed for more complex Reanimations to be done all at once, since he was the one reanimating the dragon beasts for Zansul one-by-one. The entire observatory grounds and the land around it began to crumble as Jiji used the particles to reanimate humongous dragon beasts. The poison paralyzed Sakura, and she was incapable to avoid the falling rubble.
286	"Sasuke's Story: The Ring"; Transliteration: "Sasuke Retsuden・Yubiwa" (Japanese: サスケ烈伝・指輪)	Itoko Nagai; Noriyuki Abe	Kō Shigenobu	February 5, 2023
Sasuke, helped by the Meno he put in a genjutsu, fought through several flying beasts to reach the observatory, while also figuring out that Jiji was Zansul's accomplice. Sasuke then dug Sakura out from under the rubble and healed her. After Meno saved Ganno and the other inmates from the beasts, Sakura lead majority of the horde away and crushed them with her taijutsu. Jiji broke off from Zansul to go after her, while Sasuke and Meno began fighting their way to Zansul. Sasuke's messenger hawk then brought him a letter, which he shared with Zansul, stating that Kakashi and the new king, Nanara had captured the traitorous Prime Minister Zansul was serving. While trying to get away from Sasuke, Zansul issues to many conflicting commands to the flying beasts, resulting in it dropping him to his death. After retrieving the particles from Zansul's body, Sasuke hurried to Sakura's side, who already trapped Jiji in a binding jutsu. Sasuke suspected that Jiji had different intentions than fighting Zansul's war and questioned why he went along with him. Jiji revealed that he was originally a rogue shinobi from the Hidden Sand Village, who was among shinobi invited to train Redaku's army, but fell in love with Margo, a servant girl in the royal palace. While Jiji was away on a mission, Margo passed away in an epidemic, and Zansul came forward with his offer to create the dragon beast army for Redaku, on the condition that he would receive Margo's body to reanimate afterwards. Sasuke then revealed to Jiji that the Prime Minister falsified Margo's death certificate to rope him into his schemes, and Margo was a valuable informant in Kakashi and Nanara's fight against the Prime Minister. While dispelling the reanimated beasts, Jiji stepped in front of Sakura to protect her from an attacking beast, in an effort to atone. After Sakura healed him, Jiji and Margo reunited and became Nanara's aides. Back in the Leaf, Kakashi reported on the success of the mission to Naruto and Shikamaru, while Sakura chatted with Ino. In the present, Sasuke and Sakura both wonder when he could finally settle down.
287	"Claw Marks"; Transliteration: "Tsumeato" (Japanese: 爪痕)	Ayumu Ono; Masayuki Kōda	Masaya Honda	February 12, 2023
Isshiki's soul instructs Code to sacrifice either Kawaki or Boruto to the Ten Tails and consume the Chakra Fruit it bears, so that he could become a new Ōtsutsuki and then continue to devour planets until he reaches godhood. Isshiki entrusts his will of Ōtsutsuki to Code before his soul disappears for good. Outside of the Hidden Leaf, Shikamaru and Sai discover strange markings, which Kawaki confirms to be Code's Claw Marks, which he can use as a means of transportation. Elsewhere, Code tracks down one of Boro's Cult's facilities in a snowy country. Kawaki criticizes Boruto for blindly trusting Amado's medicine, but Boruto says he only takes it, because he has to do something to prevent Momoshiki gaining control again. Kawaki reveals the recent findings of Code's Claw Marks as well and warns Boruto not to underestimate him, since he is special, even among the other Inners, for surviving the Karma ritual and gaining a White Karma, which is the source of his powers. Kawaki explains that due to this Karma, his physical prowess alone far exceeded Jigen's and unlike the rest of the Inners, who were enhanced by Amado, Code actually had limiters placed on him, out of loyalty to Isshiki, in order to not be stronger than his current vessel. Kawaki expands that Amado had actually created several cyborgs surpassing Jigen, but they were ordered to be destroyed. Shikamaru and Sai report to Naruto, and the former notes the similarity of the four Claw Marks they found by the village to the Flying Raijin Jutsu. Naruto instructs them to inform Sasuke, who is most likely among Code's targets as one of the people responsible for Isshiki's death. Amado advises Shikamaru that Code would already moving toward the goal of having his limiters removed, meaning that Amado is his most important target. Kawaki suggests a plan to Boruto, to implant his own Karma onto Code, which would turn the latter into his Vessel and rid him of Momoshiki. Boruto refuses to implant someone else with Karma, and suggests they keep training to become stronger. Code slaughters his way to the inside of the facility, where he finds an Outer named Bug. He informs him of Jigen and Boro's demise and asks to see Eida, one of the cyborgs stronger than Jigen, who was supposed to be terminated, revealing that he knows Boro stockpiled several of Amado's powerful creations there. Code and Bug awaken Eida, who seems to have some clairvoyant abilities. When Eida ignores Code, he tries to attack her.
288	"Captives"; Transliteration: "Toriko" (Japanese: 虜)	Yūta Suzuki	Hideto Tanaka	February 19, 2023
Code tries to attack Eida, but realizes he is physically incapable of harming her. She orders Bug to guide Code to the bar. They discuss her abilities of clairvoyance. She explains that she can see any events from the day she was born till the present only, and cannot see further back into the past or the future at all. To show her ability off, she peers into Kawaki's current whereabouts, seeing him arguing with the rest of Team 7 about how to deal with Code. Kawaki is tired of Sarada's training ideas and instigates training through combat. Boruto steps in to take on Kawaki 1-on-1 and the winner decides how they train. Code interrupts Eida's viewing to ask how to remove his limiters, in order to kill Sasuke and Naruto. Eida explains that Amado is the only one who can remove it, since a scan of his eye and voice command are needed, and that he has Scientific Ninja Tools implanted in his eyes, making it impossible for someone to use Transformation Jutsu to disguise themselves as Amado to remove it. Kawaki forces Boruto to use his Karma, because if they were to fight Code, Boruto would lose due to his refusal to rely on the Karma. Eida refuses to do anything else with Code, since she needs Ōtsutsuki to solve her problems, but Code cannot bring himself to attack her and seems to be completely enamored with her. She explains that Code has fallen for her, due to her other ability, to passively captivate both men and women with her presence, denying her any chances for real relationships where she would be truly liked, and she hates Amado for implementing this into her. Code realizes that Boro couldn't dispose of her on Jigen's orders, because he already was captivated by her too. Finally, Eida explains that this infectious love doesn't work on her blood relatives and on Ōtsutsuki, which is why she could experience true romance with someone like Kawaki. Boruto overwhelms Kawaki with his Karma, and the latter ponders on how he could even protect Naruto from Code in such a weakened state. Boruto explains, that he did not want to use his Karma, so as not to hurt those he cares about again, but has now realized through sparring, that they need to use everything to beat Code. Kawaki exclaims that he will make sure to stop Momoshiki, should he ever emerge again. The team makes peace and wonders if they're in trouble for Boruto accidentally damaging Kawaki's headband. Eida provides a retelling of Isshiki's demise to Code and agrees to partner up.
289	"Qualifications"; Transliteration: "Shikaku" (Japanese: 資格)	Yūsuke Onoda	Masaya Honda	February 26, 2023
Kawaki has visions of Code terrorizing him, while Amado and Sumire run a check-up on him. Amado angers Kawaki by stating that he is still Isshiki's Vessel, and he can protect Naruto only if he becomes stronger, suggesting that he obtains Karma again, only as a weapon. Eida sees this with her Senrigan eyes and makes Code promise to remove Kawaki from his kill list. Eida accepts Code as his guardian knight, but the latter retorts that he'd be unable to protect her if Kawaki chose to attack her, since Kawaki is immune to her, and Code can't kill him. Eida decides to introduce Code to his other knight, who is immune to her as a blood relative, her little brother Daemon. Kawaki lashes out at Team Shikadai in public, but they soothe him and tell him he belongs in the Leaf. Himawari asks Boruto to spar with her, but Boruto is scared of what his Karma could do and refuses. Sumire questions Amado's hidden motives, so he explains that Isshiki's vast powers are stored within Kawaki and if he wants them, he'd need a Karma to access it, which would be good for the village. Bug releases Daemon, who immediately kills the ambushing guards with their own attacks. Eida explains to Code that Daemon subconsciously reflects whatever attacks were targeted at him with killing intent back onto the attackers, inflicting as much damage to them, as it was supposed to inflict on Daemon. Naruto goes to retrieve Kawaki, who was sitting atop his Great Stone Face. Kawaki anguishes that he does not belong in a peaceful village like the Hidden Leaf. Naruto comforts him, by calling him his son and takes him home. Hinata awaits them with a big family dinner, during which Boruto gifts Kawaki his headband as an apology, citing that he'll just wear Sasuke's. Himawari is worried for Boruto and asks Kawaki to protect him. When talking to Naruto, Kawaki realizes what he must do to protect him and the Leaf.
290	"Presence"; Transliteration: "Kehai" (Japanese: 気配)	Yoshifumi Sasahara	Masaya Honda	March 5, 2023
Shikadai and Inojin try to ward away Kawaki and Boruto's annoyance of a sensory type shinobi assigned to watch them and the enemy at all times. Shikamaru voices his suspicions to Amado, that everything is going according to some master plan he concocted. Eida watches as how Kawaki fools his family and the bodyguard with the chakra erasure Jutsu and a Shadow Clone to sneak away into the night. Boruto is able to sense that the real Kawaki left and tries to lead Naruto to him. Kawaki leaves the village and Eida informs Code, who decides that they should meet directly. Using his Claw Marks, Code teleports to the woods near the village and Eida guides him to Kawaki. Naruto informs Shikamaru through Ino of the situation and tells the latter to dispatch the Sensory Team to find Kawaki. Boruto heads off after him, since he can sense his presence somehow. Code subdues Kawaki and asks why he left on his own. Kawaki tries to convince Code to kill only him, since he technically is responsible for the death of Isshiki. Code declares his intention to follow Isshiki's will to become an Ōtsutsuki god. As Code attempts to take Kawaki to Eida however, Boruto steps in and knocks Code back. Boruto realized that Kawaki intended to use himself as bait to draw Code in and berates him for his recklessness. Code is pleased to hear that Naruto is tracking Boruto's chakra to his location, which is exactly what Kawaki was trying to avoid. Kawaki demands to speak with whoever Code was trying to take him to, flustering Eida as she is listening in. Boruto stops Kawaki from leaving, saying that while the latter is doing everything, he can to protect Naruto, the Boruto will also do everything he can to protect Kawaki. Eida is turned on by Boruto as well, while he activates his Karma.
291	"Control"; Transliteration: "Kontorōru" (Japanese: 支配(コントロール))	Ema Saitō	Masaya Honda	March 12, 2023
Code expresses his devotion to Boruto as an Ōtsutsuki, as well as his displeasure that he has to feed him to the Ten-Tails. Naruto begins investigating Boruto's absence, while the latter engages Code in battle. Boruto surprises him with his jutsu and tactics, so Code activates his White Karma as well, overwhelming the former with his speed and strength. Code slaps Boruto around with ease, awakening more of Momoshiki's power in him as a result. Due to his increased strength, Boruto is able to match Code and get some good hits in. Eida theorizes that Boruto is able to channel Momoshiki's strength without him taking over because of the medicine Amado gave him. Naruto instructs Ino to track Boruto's chakra, while he enters Sage Mode. Shikamaru arrives to back up Naruto, since he no longer has Kurama's power and they both convince Hinata to stay behind for Himawari's sake. Boruto and Kawaki are surprised by Code's knowledge of the meds suppressing Momoshiki. Kawaki is resolved to help Boruto win now, for Naruto's sake. Sai informs Amado and Sumire of the ongoing battle, which seems to frustrate Amado. Boruto suddenly collapses in pain, giving Code the opening to knock out Kawaki and corner him. Just as Code was about to take Boruto, time seems to stop, and only the latter is aware. Momoshiki appears to Boruto and demands to switch with him to deal with Code. Momoshiki blasts Code away with a humongous Rasengan.
292	"Hunger"; Transliteration: "Katsubō" (Japanese: 渇望)	Masayuki Kōda	Masaya Honda	March 19, 2023
Code barely manages to escape the flurry of humongous Rasengans via his Claw Marks. When Code tries to use Kawaki as a hostage to escape with, Momoshiki manages to wound him with a highly compressed chakra bullet called Rasendan. Momoshiki takes hold of Kawaki, whose resistance is easily repelled. Before Momoshiki could break Kawaki's limbs, Shikamaru paralyzes him and Naruto saves Kawaki. While Kawaki warns the Hokage to leave, Code ensnares Shikamaru. Code convinces Momoshiki to deal out his vengeance on Naruto, while he holds Shikamaru down. Kawaki tries to protect Naruto, but Momoshiki relentlessly beats him down. When Momoshiki creates another Massive Rasengan to kill Naruto with, Kawaki's Karma finally reawakens to absorb it, Amado having secretly given it back to him. Eida informs Code, that Amado has likely already restored Kawaki's Karma when he regenerated his right arm. Kawaki goes toe-to-toe with Momoshiki, being able to use Isshiki's Sukunahikona and Daikokuten with his new Karma. Kawaki launches a barrage of shrunken rods and cubes at Momoshiki. Naruto questions whether he is still really Kawaki, who professes that he will do absolutely everything to protect Naruto. Kawaki and Momoshiki engage in taijutsu, but Momoshiki slowly gains the upper hand, so he begins shrinking and enlarging each other's projectiles again, starting to awaken Boruto. Naruto then saves Boruto from being crushed by a cube and pleads with Kawaki to spare Boruto. Boruto chimes in that the meds were a temporary solution, but they now need a permanent solution to eliminate Momoshiki. Kawaki reminds Boruto of his promise to stop him permanently, and Boruto gives his permission to him. He tells Naruto to say goodbye to Hinata and Himawari for him, before knocking him out of their way. Kawaki punches a hole through Boruto's chest, like he did Garou's, killing him instantly.
293	"Farewell"; Transliteration: "Wakare" (Japanese: 別れ)	Nozomi Fukui	Masaya Honda	March 26, 2023
While cradling his son's lifeless body, Naruto thinks back to Boruto's childhood. Eida warns Code not to try to use Kawaki as the sacrifice. Code tries using Shikamaru as a hostage against the approaching Kawaki, but the latter is unbothered by his potential death. As such, Code attempts to retreat, but Kawaki shrinks his Claw Marks with Sukunahikona. Code realizes that he is currently too weak and Kawaki severely beats him down. When Kawaki tries to obliterate him with a huge blast, Code pulls Daemon halfway through a Claw Mark to reflect the attack back at Kawaki. Shikamaru tries to pull Naruto out of his despair but is shocked to see Kawaki defeated by the child unknown to him. Code tries taking Kawaki but Shikamaru steps in, boasting that Code is too weak to fight against the arriving reinforcements, so he leaves. Shikamaru asks Naruto about the public repercussions Kawaki would have to face, but Naruto retorts that Kawaki is still his family and will protect him, despite him killing Boruto. However, Boruto soon awakens and reveals that Momoshiki forcibly extracted the remainder of his Karma to heal him at the cost of his resurrection. However, this results in Boruto becoming a full Ōtsutsuki now. In private, Momoshiki says that this was a one-time resolution only and he gleefully expresses that his previous prophecy of Boruto still stands. Eida tells Code about Boruto's resurrection and reinforces his mission to bring Kawaki to her. Kawaki awakens in the infirmary and Sumire tells him about Boruto's survival. Kawaki curses Amado but is also glad for the first time to have Karma. Kawaki and Boruto meet and Boruto tells Kawaki Momoshiki's prophecy. Kawaki expresses that he will kill anyone who poses a threat to Naruto while Boruto is determined to prove the prophecy wrong.

== Home media release ==
=== Japanese ===
Aniplex (Japan, Region 2)
DVD	Release date	Discs	Episodes	DVD-BOX	Release date	Discs	Episodes
68	May 10, 2023	1	261–263	16	August 2, 2023	4	261–273
69	June 7, 2023	1	264–266	16	August 2, 2023	4	261–273
70	July 5, 2023	1	267–269	16	August 2, 2023	4	261–273
71	August 2, 2023	1	270–273	16	August 2, 2023	4	261–273
72	September 6, 2023	1	274–277	17	January 10, 2024	5	274–293
73	October 4, 2023	1	278–281	17	January 10, 2024	5	274–293
74	November 1, 2023	1	282–286	17	January 10, 2024	5	274–293
75	December 6, 2023	1	287–289	17	January 10, 2024	5	274–293
76	January 10, 2024	1	290–293	17	January 10, 2024	5	274–293

=== English ===
Viz Media (North America, Region A / 1)
Set	Release date	Discs	Episodes	Ref.
17	March 26, 2024	3	256–273	
18	August 13, 2024	3	274–293	
